= Golden Earring discography =

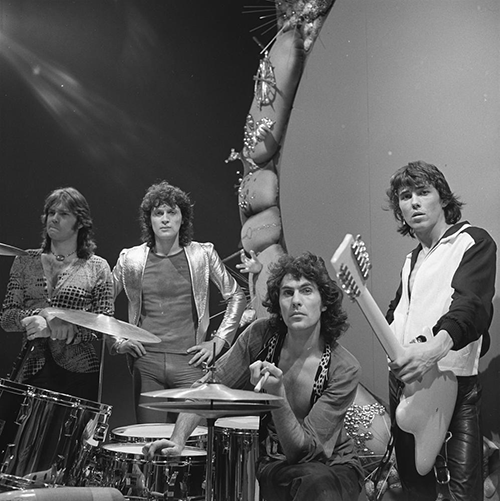
- Studio albums: 26
- Live albums: 8
- Compilation albums: 3
- Singles: 74

The discography of Dutch rock band Golden Earring, which consists of 26 studio albums, 8 live albums, 3 compilation albums, and 74 singles.

== Studio albums ==
Year	Album	Peak chart position							Certification
Year	Album	NLD	AUS	US	CAN	GER	SWE	UK	Certification
1965	Just Ear-rings	—	—	—	—	—	—	—	
1967	Winter-Harvest	—	—	—	—	—	—	—	
1968	Miracle Mirror	—	—	—	—	—	—	—	
1969	On the Double	4	—	—	—	—	—	—	
1969	Eight Miles High	5	—	—	—	—	—	—	
1970	Golden Earring	1	—	—	—	—	—	—	
1971	Seven Tears	1	—	—	—	—	—	—	
1972	Together	6	—	—	—	33	—	—	
1973	Moontan	1	13	12	15	35	—	24	US: Gold; CAN: Gold
1975	Switch	1	93	108	79	—	—	—	
1976	To the Hilt	3	—	156	—	—	46	—	
1976	Contraband (US title: Mad Love released 1977)	10	—	182	—	—	—	—	
1978	Grab It for a Second	13	—	—	—	—	—	—	
1979	No Promises...No Debts	2	—	—	—	—	—	—	
1980	Prisoner of the Night (US title: Long Blond Animal)	7	—	—	—	—	—	—	
1982	Cut	1	—	24	18	—	—	—	CAN: Gold; NVPI: Gold
1984	N.E.W.S.	1	—	107	91	—	—	—	NVPI: Gold
1986	The Hole	5	—	196	—	—	—	—	
1989	Keeper of the Flame	11	—	—	—	—	—	—	
1991	Bloody Buccaneers	3	—	—	—	—	—	—	NVPI: Gold
1994	Face It	6	—	—	—	—	—	—	NVPI: Platinum
1995	Love Sweat	17	—	—	—	—	—	—	
1999	Paradise in Distress	5	—	—	—	—	—	—	NVPI: Gold
2003	Millbrook U.S.A.	2	—	—	—	—	—	—	
2012	Tits 'n Ass	1	—	—	—	—	—	—	NVPI: Gold
"—" denotes a recording that did not chart or was not released in that territory.

== Live albums ==
Year	Album	NLD	GER	US	Certification
1977	Live	1	—	—	NVPI: Gold
1981	2nd Live	2	—	—	
1984	Something Heavy Going Down	26	—	158	
1992	The Naked Truth	2	—	—	NVPI: 3× Platinum
1997	Naked II	2	—	—	NVPI: Platinum
2000	Last Blast of the Century	4	—	—	NVPI: Gold
2005	Naked III	3	—	—	
2006	Live in Ahoy	—	—	—	
2016	Five Zero (with The Hague EP)	9	—	—	
2022	You Know We Love You! - Live Ahoy 2019	2	32	—	
2023	Back Home- The complete Leiden 1984 concert	10	—	—	
"—" denotes a recording that did not chart or was not released in that territory.

== Compilation albums ==
Year	Album	Netherlands	Belgium	Germany	Certification
1971	Greatest Hits, vol. 2	39	-	-	
1975	The Best Of Golden Earring - 10 Years 20 Hits	1	-	-	
1981	Golden Earring's Greatest Hits 3	23	-	-	
1988	The Very Best of 1965-1988	4	-	-	
1988	The Very Best of 1976-1988 Volume 2	19	-	-	
1992	The Complete Single Collection	6	-	-	
2000	The Devil Made Us Do It - 35 years	2	-	-	
2009	Collected	14	-	-	
2015	50 Years Anniversary Album	13	82	-	
2017	Complete Studio Recordings [29-CD boxed set]	14	-	-	
2018	Alive... Through the Years [11-CD boxed set]	40	-	64	

== Extended plays ==
Year	Album
2015	The Hague

== Singles ==
Year	Single	Peak chart positions							Album
Year	Single	NLD	BEL	US	GER	AUT	SWI	UK	Album
1965	"Please Go" b/w "Chunk of Steel"	8	—	—	—	—	—	—	Just Ear-rings
1965	"Lonely Everyday" b/w "Not to Find"	—	—	—	—	—	—	—	Just Ear-rings
1966	"That Day" b/w "The Words I Need"	2	—	—	—	—	—	—	Non-album single
1966	"If You Leave Me" b/w "Waiting for You"	8	—	—	—	—	—	—	Non-album single
1966	"Things Go Better" b/w "Rum and Cola"	—	—	—	—	—	—	—	Non-album single
1966	"Daddy Buy Me a Girl" b/w "What You Gonna Tell"	15	—	—	—	—	—	—	Non-album single
1966	"Don't Run Too Far" b/w "Wings"	19	—	—	—	—	—	—	Non-album single
1967	"In My House" b/w "Smoking Cigarettes"	10	—	—	—	—	—	—	Winter-Harvest
1967	"Sound of the Screaming Day" b/w "She Won't Come to Me"	4	—	—	—	—	—	—	Non-album single
1967	"Together We Live, Together We Love" b/w "I Wonder" / "Preview Together We Live and Love"	5	—	—	—	—	—	—	Non-album single
1968	"The Truth About Arthur" b/w "Gipsy Rhapsody"	—	—	—	—	—	—	—	Miracle Mirror
1968	"I've Just Lost Somebody" b/w "The Truth About Arthur"	8	—	—	—	—	—	—	Miracle Mirror
1968	"Dong-Dong-Di-Ki-Di-Gi-Dong" b/w "Wake Up - Breakfast!"	1	15	—	—	—	—	—	Non-album single
1968	"Just a Little Bit of Peace in My Heart" b/w "Remember My Friend "	3	—	—	—	—	—	—	On the Double
1969	"Where Will I Be" b/w "It's Alright, But I Admit It Could Be Better"	7	—	—	—	—	—	—	Non-album single
1969	"It's Alright, But I Admit It Could Be Better" b/w "Song of a Devil's Servant"	—	—	—	—	—	—	—	Non-album single
1969	"Another 45 Miles" b/w "I Can't Get a Hold on Her"	3	—	—	—	—	—	—	Non-album single
1970	"Back Home" b/w "This Is the Time of the Year"	1	2	—	15	—	6	—	Golden Earring
1971	"Holy Holy Life" b/w "Jessica"	3	12	—	24	—	—	—	Non-album single
1971	"She Flies on Strange Wings (Part 1)" b/w "She Flies on Strange Wings (Part 2)"	4	—	—	—	—	—	—	Seven Tears
1972	"Buddy Joe" b/w "Avalanche of Love "	3	5	—	12	—	—	—	Together
1972	"Stand by Me" b/w "All Day Watcher"	8	37	—	45	—	—	—	Non-album single
1973	"Radar Love" b/w "The Song Is Over" (Europe); "Just Like Vince Taylor" (UK)	1	6	13	5	10	—	7	Moontan
1974	"Instant Poetry" b/w "From Heaven from Hell" (1974 version)	3	13	—	24	—	—	51	Non-album single
1974	"Candy's Going Bad" b/w "She Flies on Strange Wings" (edit)	—	—	91	—	—	—	—	Moontan
1975	"Ce Soir" b/w "Lucky Number"	6	20	—	—	—	—	—	Switch
1975	"Tons of Time" b/w "Love Is a Rodeo"	—	—	—	—	—	—	—	Switch
1975	"The Switch" b/w "The Lonesome D.J."	—	—	—	—	—	—	—	Switch
1976	"Sleepwalkin'" b/w "Babylon"	7	24		—	—	—	—	To the Hilt
1976	"To the Hilt" b/w "Violins (part 1)"	—	—	—	—	—	—	—	To the Hilt
1976	"Bombay" b/w "Faded Jeans"	7	11	—	—	—	—	—	Contraband
1977	"Just Like Vince Taylor" (live) b/w "Radar Love" (live)	30	—	—	—	—	—	44	Live
1978	"Movin' Down Life" b/w "Can't Talk Now"	20	—	—	—	—	—	—	Grab It for a Second
1979	"Weekend Love" b/w "Only a Matter of Time"	4	10	—	—	—	—	—	No Promises...No Debts
1979	"I Do Rock 'n Roll" b/w "Sellin' Out"	18	—	—	—	—	—	—	Non-album single
1980	"Long Blond Animal" b/w "Triple Threat"	15	20	—	—	—	—	—	Prisoner of the Night
1980	"No for an Answer" b/w "Annie"	36	—	—	—	—	—	—	Prisoner of the Night
1981	"Slow Down"	—	—	—	—	—	—	—	2nd Live
1982	"Twilight Zone"	1	5	10	—	—	—	—	Cut
1983	"The Devil Made Me Do It"	15	24	79	—	—	—	—	Cut
1984	"When The Lady Smiles"	1	1	76	—	—	—	—	N.E.W.S.
1984	"Clear Night Moonlight"	6	13	—	—	—	—	—	N.E.W.S.
1984	"N.E.W.S."	48	—	—	—	—	—	—	N.E.W.S.
1984	"Something Heavy Going Down"	22	40	—	—	—	—	—	Something Heavy Going Down
1986	"Quiet Eyes"	9	—		—	—	—	—	The Hole
1986	"Why Do I"	37	—	—	—	—	—	—	The Hole
1986	"They Dance"	—	—	—	—	—	—	—	The Hole
1988	"My Killer, My Shadow"	31	—	—	—	—	—	—	Keeper of the Flame
1989	"Turn the World Around"	8	33	—	—	—	—	—	Keeper of the Flame
1989	"Distant Love"	73	—	—	—	—	—	—	Keeper of the Flame
1991	"Going to the Run"	4	42	—	—	—	—	—	Bloody Buccaneers
1991	"Temporary Madness"	32	—	—	—	—	—	—	Bloody Buccaneers
1991	"Pouring My Heart Out Again"	51	—	—	—	—	—	—	Bloody Buccaneers
1992	"Making Love to Yourself"	—	—	—	—	—	—	—	Bloody Buccaneers
1992	"Bloody Buccaneers"	—	—	—	—	—	—	—	Bloody Buccaneers
1992	"I Can't Sleep Without You"	29	—	—	—	—	—	—	The Naked Truth
1993	"Another 45 Miles" (live)	23	—	—	—	—	—	—	The Naked Truth
1993	"Long Blond Animal" (live)	23	—	—	—	—	—	—	The Naked Truth
1993	"As Long as the Wind Blows" (live)	30	—	—	—	—	—	—	The Naked Truth
1994	"Hold Me Now"	12	—	—	—	—	—	169	Face It
1994	"Johnny Make Believe"	43	—	—	—	—	—	—	Face It
1996	"Gotta See Jane"	—	—	—	—	—	—	—	Love Sweat
1996	"This Wheel's on Fire"	—	—	—	—	—	—	—	Love Sweat
1997	"Burning Stuntman"	26	—	—	—	—	—	—	Non-album single
1998	"The Devil Made Me Do It" (live)	62	—	—	—	—	—	—	Naked II
1999	"Paradise In Distress"	29	—	—	—	—	—	—	Paradise in Distress
1999	"Whisper in a Crowd"	74	—	—	—	—	—	—	Paradise in Distress
2000	"Miles Away from Nowhere"	79	—	—	—	—	—	—	Non-album single
2000	"Yes! We're on Fire"	55	—	—	—	—	—	—	Non-album single
2003	"Albino Moon"	16	—	—	—	—	—	—	Millbrook U.S.A.
2003	"A Sound I Never Heard"	50	—	—	—	—	—	—	Millbrook U.S.A.
2005	"I've Just Lost Somebody" (live)	5	—	—	—	—	—	—	Naked III, Live at Panama
2005	"Angel" (live)	18	—	—	—	—	—	—	Naked III, Live at Panama
2012	"Still Got the Keys to My First Cadillac"	17	—	—	—	—	—	—	Tits 'n Ass
2019	"Say When"	—	—	—	—	—	—	—	Non-album single
"—" denotes a recording that did not chart or was not released in that territory.
