= Last Blast of the Century =

Live album by Golden Earring
- Released: 17 January 2000
- Recorded: 12 November - 18 December 1999
- Genre: Hard rock
- Length: 148:31
- Label: Roadrunner International
- Producer: Golden Earring; John Sonneveld

Golden Earring chronology
Paradise in Distress (1999)	Last Blast of the Century (2000)	Millbrook U.S.A. (2003)

Last Blast of the Century is the sixth live album by Dutch hard rock band Golden Earring, released in 2000 (see 2000 in music). The album was not issued in the U.S.

== Track listing ==
All songs written by Hay and Kooymans except where noted.

All tracks are written by George Kooymans and Barry Hay, except where noted.

CD1
No.	Title	Writer(s)	Studio version	Length
1.	"Just Like Vince Taylor"		Moontan (1973)	4:01
2.	"Heartbeat"	Kooymans, Hay, Rinus Gerritsen, Cesar Zuiderwijk	No Promises...No Debts (1979)	3:34
3.	"Another 45 Miles"	Kooymans	A-side single (1969)	3:29
4.	"Long Blond Animal"		Prisoner of the Night (1980)	4:56
5.	"Liquid Soul"		Face It (1994)	5:11
6.	"The Fighter"		Paradise in Distress (1999)	7:41
7.	"Hold Me Now"		Face It	3:57
8.	"Gambler's Blues"	Kooymans, Hay, E.H. Roelfzema	Paradise in Distress	4:31
9.	"Twilight Zone"	Kooymans	Cut (1982)	12:37
10.	"Evil Love Chain"	Kooymans, Hay, E.H. Roelfzema	Paradise in Distress	5:01
11.	"Take My Hand, Close My Eyes"		Paradise in Distress	5:46
12.	"One Night Without You"		Paradise in Distress	4:19
13.	"Paradise in Distress"		Paradise in Distress	5:43
Total length:				70:57

CD2
No.	Title	Writer(s)	Studio version	Length
1.	"In a Bad Mood"		Bloody Buccaneers (1991)	6:00
2.	"Making Love to Yourself"	Kooymans, Hay, Zuiderwijk	Bloody Buccaneers	5:07
3.	"Whisper in a Crowd"		Paradise in Distress	4:01
4.	"Going to the Run"		Bloody Buccaneers	4:06
5.	"Distant Love"	Gerritsen	Keeper of the Flame (1989)	6:18
6.	"She Flies on Strange Wings"	Kooymans	Seven Tears (1971)	7:16
7.	"Burning Stuntman"		Naked II (1997)	6:16
8.	"The Devil Made Me Do It"		Cut	5:28
9.	"Johnny Make Believe"		Face It	4:51
10.	"When the Lady Smiles"		N.E.W.S. (1984)	7:26
11.	"Legalize Telepathy"	Kooymans, Hay, Roelfzema	Face It	4:20
12.	"Radar Love"		Moontan	9:51
13.	"I Can't Sleep Without You"		The Naked Truth (1992)	6:45
Total length:				77:54

== Personnel ==
Golden Earring

- Barry Hay – vocals, rhythm guitar
- George Kooymans – lead guitar, vocals
- Rinus Gerritsen – bass
- Cesar Zuiderwijk – drums

Additional musicians

- Robert Jan Stips – keyboards (special guest) on "Hold Me Now", "Gambler's Blues", "Twilight Zone"
- Bertus Borgers – saxophone (special guest) on "Gambler's Blues"
- The Last Blast Horns: Ruud Breuls, Wim Both, Jan Oosting, Philip Kolb, Jelle Schouten, Marcel Rijs, Bert Pfeiffer, Peter Broekhuizen – horns
- Secret Weapons: Berget Lewis, Patricia Balrak, Marjorie Pelgrim, Tarif Heljanan – backing vocals

== Production ==
- Producers: Golden Earring, John Sonneveld
- Engineers: Golden Earring, John Sonneveld
- Horn arrangements: Hans Hollestelle
- Vocal director: Berget Lewis
- Art direction: Barry Hay, Henk Schiffmacher
- Photography: Kees Tabak

== Charts ==
=== Weekly charts ===
Chart (2000)	Peak position
Dutch Albums (Album Top 100)	4

=== Year-end charts ===
Chart (2000)	Position
Dutch Albums (Album Top 100)	76

== Certifications ==
Region	Certification	Certified units/sales
Netherlands (NVPI)	Gold	40,000^{^}
^{^} Shipments figures based on certification alone.
