= Something Heavy Going Down =

Live album by Golden Earring
- Released: November 1984
- Recorded: June 1984
- Genre: Hard rock
- Length: 63:51
- Label: Twenty-One Records
- Producer: Golden Earring, Shell Schellekens

Golden Earring chronology
N.E.W.S. (1983)	Something Heavy Going Down (1984)	The Hole (1986)

Singles from Something Heavy Going Down
- 1. "Something Heavy Going Down" Released: 16 November 1984

Professional ratings
Review scores
Source	Rating
AllMusic	3/5 stars

Something Heavy Going Down is the third live album by Dutch hard rock band Golden Earring, released in 1984.

== Track listing ==
All tracks are written by George Kooymans and Barry Hay, except where noted.

Original release
No.	Title	Writer(s)	Studio version	Length
1.	"Long Blond Animal"		Prisoner of the Night (1980)	6:16
2.	"Twilight Zone"	Kooymans	Cut (1982)	9:37
3.	"When the Lady Smiles"		N.E.W.S. (1984)	6:08
4.	"Future"	Kooymans	Cut	7:00
5.	"Something Heavy Going Down"		New studio track	4:37
6.	"Enough Is Enough"		N.E.W.S.	4:10
7.	"Mission Impossible"	Kooymans	N.E.W.S.	8:49
8.	"Radar Love" (bonus track on CS/CD)		Moontan (1973)	9:33
9.	"Clear Night Moonlight"		N.E.W.S.	6:23

== Personnel ==
- George Kooymans - guitar, vocals
- Rinus Gerritsen - bass guitar, keyboards
- Barry Hay - guitar, vocals
- Cesar Zuiderwijk - drums

== Production ==
- Producers: Golden Earring, Shell Schellekens
- Mixing: John Smit, John Smith

== Charts ==
Chart (1984)	Peak position
Dutch Albums (Album Top 100)	26
US Billboard 200	158
