= Live (Golden Earring album) =

Live album by Golden Earring
- Released: August 1977
- Recorded: February 27 and March 25, 1977
- Venue: Theater de Storm, Winterswijk and Rainbow Theatre, London
- Genre: Hard rock; progressive rock
- Length: 87:07
- Label: Polydor
- Producer: John Kriek

Golden Earring chronology
Contraband (1976)	Live (1977)	Grab It for a Second (1978)

Singles from Live
- 1. "Radar Love" Released: 9 September 1977

Live is the first live album by Dutch rock band Golden Earring, released in 1977. It was recorded primarily at the Rainbow Theatre in London on March 25, 1977, with Side B "Second Heat" recorded February 27, 1977 at Theater de Storm, Winterswijk, Netherlands.

In 2022 the album was reissued as the second installment of Red Bullet Productions' Remastered & Expanded series, with the original Sides A–C on CD1, Side D plus bonus tracks on CD2, and a bonus DVD. The CD bonus tracks were recorded March 18, 1977 at Zaal Tea Groene Poorte in Brugge, Belgium, and include alternate versions of two songs from the original LP, and "I Need Love", which was not. The bonus tracks are rounded out by the two single edits released in 1977.

The DVD includes four live tracks from IJsselhallen, Zwolle, Netherlands on August 28, 1977, including a pre-release version of "Leather", which was recorded for the subsequent LP Grab It for a Second.

Professional ratings
Review scores
Source	Rating
Allmusic	link

== Track listing ==
=== Original release ===
All tracks are written by George Kooymans and Barry Hay, except "She Flies on Strange Wings" by Kooymans, and "Eight Miles High" by Gene Clark, Jim McGuinn, David Crosby.

Side A: "First Heat"
No.	Title	Studio version	Length
1.	"Candy's Going Bad"	Moontan (1973)	5:06
2.	"She Flies on Strange Wings"	Seven Tears (1971)	8:10
3.	"Mad Love's Comin'"	Contraband (1976)	9:53
Total length:			23:06

Side B: "Second Heat"
No.	Title	Studio version	Length
1.	"Eight Miles High"	Eight Miles High (1969)	10:01
2.	"Vanilla Queen"	Moontan	11:45
Total length:			21:50

Side C: "Third Heat"
No.	Title	Studio version	Length
1.	"To the Hilt"	To the Hilt (1976)	6:55
2.	"Fightin' Windmills"	Contraband	8:26
3.	"Con Man"	Contraband	9:09
Total length:			24:51

Side D: "Heat Four (We Want More)"
No.	Title	Studio version	Length
1.	"Radar Love"	Moontan	11:17
2.	"Just Like Vince Taylor"	Moontan	6:25
Total length:			17:41

=== 2022 Remastered & Expanded reissue ===
CD1: "First Heat" / "Second Heat" / "Third Heat"
No.	Title	Length
1.	"Candy's Going Bad"	5:06
2.	"She Flies on Strange Wings"	8:09
3.	"Mad Love's Comin'"	9:51
4.	"Eight Miles High"	10:06
5.	"Vanilla Queen"	11:44
6.	"To the Hilt"	6:40
7.	"Fightin' Windmills"	8:50
8.	"Con Man"	9:20
Total length:		69:46

CD2: "Heat Four (We Want More)"
No.	Title	Length
1.	"Radar Love"	11:16
2.	"Just Like Vince Taylor"	6:26

CD2: Bonus tracks
No.	Title	Studio version	Length
3.	"Fightin' Windmills" (Brugge 1977)		7:50
4.	"Eight Miles High" (Brugge 1977)		9:13
5.	"I Need Love" (Brugge 1977)	Mad Love (US/Canada only) (1977)	6:47
6.	"Radar Love" (single version)		4:46
7.	"Just Like Vince Taylor" (single version)		4:00
Total length:			50:18

DVD
No.	Title	Studio version	Length
1.	"Mad Love's Comin'" (live Zwolle 1977)		9:47
2.	"Leather" (live Zwolle 1977)	Grab It for a Second (1978)	6:54
3.	"Radar Love" (live Zwolle 1977)		10:14
4.	"Just Like Vince Taylor" (live Zwolle 1977)		7:16

== Personnel ==
- Barry Hay – vocals, guitar
- George Kooymans – guitars, vocals
- Eelco Gelling – guitars
- Rinus Gerritsen – bass guitar
- Cesar Zuiderwijk – drums, percussion

== Production ==
- John Kriek – producer; mixing (except "Eight Miles High", "Vanilla Queen" and Brugge 1977 tracks)
- Steve Lillywhite – engineer (except "Eight Miles High", "Vanilla Queen" and Brugge 1977 tracks)
- Damon Lyon-Shaw – mixing
- Koos Van Oostrom – cover illustrations
- Paul Gerritsma – photography
- Dorien van der Valk – photography
- Wouter Bessels – production, compilation, research, remastering (2022 reissue)
- Wout de Kruif – tape transfers (2022 reissue)
- Geert Popma – DVD director (2002 reissue)

== Charts ==
Chart (1977)	Peak position
Dutch Albums (Album Top 100)	1

Chart (2022)	Peak position
Belgian Albums (Ultratop Flanders)	127

== Certifications ==
Region	Certification	Certified units/sales
Netherlands (NVPI)	Gold	50,000^{^}
^{^} Shipments figures based on certification alone.
