= 2nd Live =

Live album by Golden Earring
- Released: May 1981
- Genre: Hard rock; progressive rock
- Length: 73:28
- Label: Polydor
- Producer: Golden Earring

Golden Earring chronology
Prisoner of the Night (1980)	2nd Live (1981)	Cut (1982)

Singles from 2nd Live
- 1. "Slow Down" Released: June 1981

2nd Live is the second live album by Dutch hard rock band Golden Earring, released in May 1981 (see 1981 in music). The album was not issued in the U.S.

== Track listing ==
All tracks are written by George Kooymans and Barry Kay, except where noted.

Disc one
No.	Title	Writer(s)	Studio version	Length
1.	"Don't Stop the Show"	Kooymans, Hay, Rinus Gerritsen, Cesar Zuiderwijk	No Promises...No Debts (1979)	3:24
2.	"My Town"		Prisoner of the Night (1980)	3:29
3.	"No for an Answer"		Prisoner of the Night	4:42
4.	"Heart Beat"	Kooymans, Hay, Gerritsen, Zuiderwijk	No Promises...No Debts	4:07
5.	"Save Your Skin"	Kooymans, Hay, Gerritsen, Zuiderwijk	No Promises...No Debts	9:07
6.	"I Don't Wanna Be Nobody Else"		Prisoner of the Night	5:32
7.	"Long Blond Animal"		Prisoner of the Night	4:57
Total length:				35:17

Disc two
No.	Title	Writer(s)	Studio version	Length
1.	"Prisoner of the Night"		Prisoner of the Night	5:49
2.	"Weekend Love"	Kooymans, Hay, Gerritsen, Zuiderwijk	No Promises...No Debts	6:27
3.	"Sleepwalkin'"		To the Hilt (1976)	6:39
4.	"I Do Rock 'N Roll"		Non-album single (1979)	5:03
5.	"Slow Down"	Larry Williams	Larry Williams' single (1958)	4:51
6.	"Buddy Joe"		Together (1972)	3:35
7.	"Back Home"		Golden Earring (1970)	5:47
Total length:				38:12

== Personnel ==
Golden Earring

- Barry Hay – vocals, rhythm guitar, flute
- George Kooymans – lead guitar, vocals
- Rinus Gerritsen – bass guitar, keyboard
- Cesar Zuiderwijk – drums

Production

- John Kriek – recording, mixing
- Greg Calbi – mastering
- Kees Tabak – photography
- Kees O. – design

== Charts ==
Chart (1981)	Peak position
Dutch Albums (Album Top 100)	2
