= Tits 'n Ass =

Studio album by Golden Earring
- Released: 11 May 2012
- Genre: Hard rock
- Length: 55:49
- Producer: Chris Kimsey, Golden Earring

Golden Earring chronology
Live in Ahoy (2006)	Tits 'n Ass (2012)

Professional ratings
Review scores
Source	Rating
Classic Rock	3.5/5 stars

Tits 'n Ass is the twenty-fifth and final studio album by Dutch rock band Golden Earring, released on 11 May 2012. It was their first studio album since 2003's Millbrook U.S.A., but was not issued in the U.S. It was the group's final album before their 2021 breakup.

The album cover model was designed by Dutch pin-up artist and tattoo designer Claudia Hek.

== Track listing ==
All songs written by Barry Hay and George Kooymans.

No.	Title	Length
1.	"Identical"	3:32
2.	"Little Time Bomb"	3:56
3.	"Cool as It Gets"	4:15
4.	"Acrobats and Clowns"	4:10
5.	"What Do I Know About Love"	4:32
6.	"Still Got the Keys to My First Cadillac"	3:50
7.	"Dope Runner"	3:43
8.	"This Love"	4:01
9.	"Stratosphere"	4:37
10.	"Over the Cliff into the Deep Deep Blue"	3:25
11.	"Flowers in the Mud"	4:10
12.	"Justin Time"	3:46
13.	"Avenue of Broken Dreams"	3:43
14.	"Wanted by Women"	4:09

== Personnel ==
Golden Earring

- Barry Hay – lead vocals (1–7, 9–13), harmony vocals (3, 4, 7, 13)
- George Kooymans – rhythm guitar (1–14), lead guitar (1, 3, 7, 11, 12), slide guitar (6), acoustic guitar (8, 10, 11, 14), 12-string guitar (12), Spanish guitar solo (14), backing vocals (1–3, 5, 7, 13), harmony vocals (2, 4–6, 9–11, 13, 14), lead vocals (5, 8, 14)
- Rinus Gerritsen – bass (1–14), rhythm guitar (10)
- Cesar Zuiderwijk – drums (1–14)

Additional musicians

- Frank Carillo – slide guitar (1, 2, 4, 6–9, 14), rhythm guitar (2, 3, 5–7, 9, 11–13), slide solo guitar (3), lead guitar (5, 8), acoustic slide guitar (8), acoustic guitar (14)
- Jan Rooymans – Hammond B3 organ (1–4, 6, 7, 9–13), backing vocals (1, 5, 7, 8, 11), Yamaha synth module (4), piano (5, 7, 8, 14), tambourine (6), electric guitars (10), synth (10), sampled strings (10), harmonium (14)
- Ruth Zang – backing vocals (5, 8)
- Pearl Jozefzoon – backing vocals (5, 8)
- Pandit Dinesh – percussion (7)

== Charts ==
Chart (2012–2013)	Peak position
Belgian Albums (Ultratop Flanders)	55
Belgian Albums (Ultratop Wallonia)	157
Dutch Albums (Album Top 100)	1

== Certifications ==
Region	Certification	Certified units/sales
Netherlands (NVPI)	Gold	25,000^{^}
^{^} Shipments figures based on certification alone.
