= Grab It for a Second =

Studio album by Golden Earring
- Released: 22 September 1978
- Recorded: DMC Baarn Netherlands; Record Plant, New York City
- Genre: Hard rock
- Length: 34:43
- Label: Polydor
- Producer: Jimmy Iovine

Golden Earring chronology
Live (1977)	Grab It for a Second (1978)	No Promises...No Debts (1979)

Singles from Grab It for a Second
- 1. "Movin' Down Life" Released: September 1978

Grab It for a Second is an album by Dutch rock band Golden Earring, released in 1978.

Professional ratings
Review scores
Source	Rating
AllMusic	2/5 stars
Smash Hits	7/10

== Track listing ==
All tracks are written by George Kooymans and Barry Hay.

Side A
No.	Title	Length
1.	"Movin' Down Life"	3:31
2.	"Against the Grain"	4:35
3.	"Grab It for a Second"	4:10
4.	"Cell-29"	6:39
Total length:		19:05

Side B
No.	Title	Length
5.	"Roxanne"	3:39
6.	"Leather"	5:01
7.	"Tempting"	3:43
8.	"U-Turn Time"	3:25
Total length:		15:58

2023 Remastered & Expanded reissue – bonus track
No.	Title	Length
9.	"I Can't Talk Now" (B-side of "Movin' Down Life" single)	3:28

== Personnel ==
Golden Earring

- Barry Hay – vocals
- George Kooymans – guitar, ARP synthesizer guitar, vocals
- Eelco Gelling – guitar, slide guitar
- Rinus Gerritsen – bass guitar, Moog Bison bass synthesizer
- Cesar Zuiderwijk – drums

Special guests

- Lani Groves – backing vocals
- Jimmy Maelen – percussion
- Kevin Nance – keyboards
- John Zangrando – saxophone on "Against the Grain"

== Production ==
- Producer: Jimmy Iovine
- Engineer: Shelly Yakus
- Assistant engineers: John Kriek, Thom Panunzio
- Mastering: Greg Calbi
- String arrangements: Kenny Ascher
- Design: Barry Hay, Mick Rock, Ernst Thormahlen
- Photography: Anton Corbijn, Mick Rock
- Illustrations: Ernst Thormahlen

== Charts ==
Chart (1978)	Peak position
Dutch Albums (Album Top 100)	13
