= The Hole (album) =

Studio album by Golden Earring
- Released: May 1986
- Genre: Hard rock
- Length: 45:17
- Label: Twenty One
- Producer: Shell Schellekens

Golden Earring chronology
Something Heavy Going Down (1984)	The Hole (1986)	Keeper of the Flame (1989)

The Hole is the eighteenth studio album by the Dutch hard rock band Golden Earring, released in 1986. The band gave a free promotion concert in support of the album on the beach of Scheveningen for an audience of 185,000. Anton Corbijn directed a video clip for the single "Quiet Eyes". It was made in the same black and white style as the photographs he made for the inner sleeve of the album.

Professional ratings
Review scores
Source	Rating
AllMusic	link

== Track listing ==
All songs written by Barry Hay and George Kooymans except where noted.

Side one

1. "They Dance" - 5:10
2. "Quiet Eyes" - 4:03
3. "Save the Best for Later" - 5:14
4. "Have a Heart" - 3:59
5. "Love in Motion" - 3:44

Side two

1. "Jane Jane" - 4:54
2. "Jump and Run" (George Kooymans) - 5:52
3. "Why Do I" - 4:44
4. "A Shout in the Dark" - 5:33

== Personnel ==
- George Kooymans - guitar, vocals
- Rinus Gerritsen - bass guitar, keyboards
- Barry Hay - vocals
- Cesar Zuiderwijk - drums

=== Additional personnel ===
- Robert Jan Stips - keyboards
- Lisa Boray - backing vocals
- Loa Boray - backing vocals
- Wim Both - trumpet
- Dionys Breukers - keyboards
- Piet Dolder - trombone
- Peter Kuyt - trumpet
- Julya Lo'Ko - backing vocals
- Patty Paff - backing vocals
- Rudi Van Dijk - saxophone

== Production ==
- Producer: Shell Schellekens
- Engineer: Kees Van Gool
- Mixing: Robin Freeman, Jan Schuurman
- Mastering: Greg Calbi
- Horn arrangements: Rudi Van Dijk
- Art direction: Anton Corbijn
- Photography: Anton Corbijn

== Charts ==
Chart (1986)	Peak position
Dutch Albums (Album Top 100)	5
US Billboard 200	196
