= Switch (Golden Earring album) =

Studio album by Golden Earring
- Released: March 1975
- Recorded: August – September 1974
- Studios: Soundpush Studios, Blaricum, Netherlands
- Genres: Hard rock; progressive rock
- Length: 35:31
- Label: Polydor
- Producer: Golden Earring

Golden Earring chronology
Moontan (1973)	Switch (1975)	To the Hilt (1976)

Singles from Switch
- 1. "Ce Soir" Released: 14 February 1975; 2. "Tons of Time" Released: May 1975 (EU); 3. "The Switch" Released: June 1975 (US)

Switch is the tenth studio album by Dutch rock band Golden Earring. It was released in 1975.

== Track listing ==
Professional ratings
Review scores
Source	Rating
Allmusic	3/5 stars

All tracks are written by George Kooymans and Barry Hay, except "Kill Me (Ce Soir)" by Kooymans, Hay, John Fenton.

Side A
No.	Title	Length
1.	"Intro: Plus Minus Absurdio"	3:08
2.	"Love Is a Rodeo"	3:37
3.	"The Switch"	5:27
4.	"Kill Me (Ce Soir)"	6:22
Total length:		18:30

Side B
No.	Title	Length
5.	"Tons of Time"	4:20
6.	"Daddy's Gonna Save My Soul"	4:15
7.	"Troubles and Hassles"	4:20
8.	"Lonesome D.J."	4:36
Total length:		17:34

2025 Remastered & Expanded reissue – bonus tracks
No.	Title	Length
9.	"Lucky Number" (B-side of "Ce Soir")	5:55
10.	"Action Alice & Bow-Tie Basil" (previously unreleased)	4:30
11.	"Kill Me (Ce Soir)" (7-inch single version)	3:32
12.	"The Switch" (7-inch single version)	3:02
13.	"Intro Plus Minus Absurdio" (rough mix)	2:56
14.	"Love Is a Rodeo" (rough mix)	3:31
15.	"The Switch" (rough mix)	5:31
16.	"Tons of Time" (rough mix)	4:25
17.	"Troubles & Hassles" (rough mix)	4:15
18.	"Love Is A Rodeo" (instrumental rough mix)	3:35
Total length:		77:34

== Personnel ==
Golden Earring

- Barry Hay – lead vocals
- George Kooymans – electric guitar, acoustic guitar, lead vocals
- Rinus Gerritsen – bass, mouth harp
- Cesar Zuiderwijk – drums, percussion
- Robert Jan Stips – keyboards, string arrangement on "Kill Me (Ce Soir)"

Additional musicians

- Eelco Gelling – slide guitar
- Bertus Borgers – saxophone

== Production ==
- Producer: Golden Earring
- Executive producer: Fred Haayen
- Engineer: Andy Knight, John Kriek, Jan Schuurman
- Mixing: Andy Knight, John Kriek
- Arranger: Golden Earring
- String arrangements: Robert Jan Stips
- Art direction: George Osaki
- Concept: Barry Hay
- Photography: Paul Gerritsma, Graham Hughes

== Charts ==
Chart (1975)	Peak position
Australian Albums (Kent Music Report)	93
Canada Top Albums/CDs (RPM)	79
Dutch Albums (Album Top 100)	1
US Billboard 200	108

== Trivia ==
"Kill Me (Ce Soir)" was covered by Iron Maiden as a B-side of their 1990 single "Holy Smoke".

On the Dutch pressing (MCA-2139) that was marketed in Europe, the Side 2 label has the song lists double printed. A slight offset is very noticeable. It is unknown how many of these 'double prints' were sold before the manufacturer caught the error.
