= The Naked Truth (Golden Earring album) =

Live album by Golden Earring
- Released: 10 November 1992
- Genre: Hard rock
- Label: First Quake
- Producer: Golden Earring, John Sonneveld

Golden Earring chronology
Bloody Buccaneers (1991)	The Naked Truth (1992)	Face It (1994)

The Naked Truth is the fourth live album by Dutch hard rock band Golden Earring, released in 1992. All songs were performed with acoustic instruments. The album has been released over the decade with additional tracks under the titles The Complete Naked Truth and Fully Naked.

Professional ratings
Review scores
Source	Rating
Allmusic	link

== Track listing ==
All songs written by Hay and Kooymans except where noted.

1. "Introduction" (Gerritsen, Hay, Kooymans, Zuiderwijk)
2. "Jangalene" (Kooymans)
3. "Another 45 Miles" (Kooymans)
4. "Mad Love's Comin'"
5. "Why Do I?"
6. "I Can't Sleep Without You"
7. "Weekend Love" (Gerritsen, Hay, Kooymans, Zuiderwijk)
8. "Vanilla Queen"
9. "Twilight Zone" (Kooymans)
10. "One Shot Away from Paradise" (Gerritsen)
11. "Long Blond Animal"
12. "Pouring My Heart Out Again"
13. "Radar Love"
14. "Eight Miles High" (Gene Clark, David Crosby, Roger McGuinn)
15. "The Naked Truth" (Hay, Kooymans, E.H. Roelfzema)

== Other versions ==
=== The Complete Naked Truth ===
A 1998 edition of the album titled The Complete Naked Truth was sold as a two disc collection. Besides the above tracks, the collection included an additional seven tracks billed as previously unreleased.

1. "Back Home" (Kooymans, Hay)
2. "Just a Little Bit of Peace in My Heart" (Kooymans)
3. "Going to the Run" (Kooymans, Hay)
4. "Jangalene" (Alternate) (Kooymans)
5. "Don't Stop the Show" (Kooymans)
6. "When the Lady Smiles" (Kooymans, Hay)
7. "Radar Love" (Edit) (Kooymans, Hay)

=== Fully Naked ===
A three disc collection titled Fully Naked was released in 2001 as a box set. Besides including the two discs above, the set included a third disc again touted as previously unreleased.

1. "In a Bad Mood"
2. "As Long As the Wind Blows"
3. "Please Go/Sound of the Screaming Day"
4. "Murdock 9 6182"
5. "Yellow and Blue"
6. "Devil Made Me Do It"
7. "Madame Zou Zou"

== Personnel ==
- Barry Hay – vocals, rhythm acoustic guitar, flutes
- George Kooymans – lead acoustic guitar, vocals
- Rinus Gerritsen – string bass, acoustic bass, mouth harp
- Cesar Zuiderwijk – drums, percussion

== Production ==
- Producers: Golden Earring, John Sonneveld
- Engineer: John Sonneveld
- Design: Henk Schiffmacher
- Photography: Reinoud Klazes, Patricia Steur

== Charts ==
=== Weekly charts ===
Chart (1992–1998)	Peak position
Dutch Albums (Album Top 100)	2

=== Year-end charts ===
Chart (1993)	Position
Dutch Albums (Album Top 100)	3

Chart (1994)	Position
Dutch Albums (Album Top 100)	79

== Certifications ==
Region	Certification	Certified units/sales
Netherlands (NVPI)	3× Platinum	300,000^{^}
^{^} Shipments figures based on certification alone.
