= Together (Golden Earring album) =

Studio album by Golden Earring
- Released: 16 June 1972
- Recorded: March 1972
- Studios: Island Studios, London
- Genres: Hard rock; progressive rock
- Length: 39:10
- Label: Polydor
- Producer: Fred Haayen

Golden Earring chronology
Seven Tears (1971)	Together (1972)	Moontan (1973)

Singles from Together
- 1. "Buddy Joe" Released: April 1972

Together is the eighth studio album by Dutch rock band Golden Earring, released in 1972 on Polydor Records. The album was not issued in the U.S.

"Buddy Joe" b/w "Avalanche of Love" was issued as the lead single in April 1972, reaching #3 in Netherlands, #5 in Belgium and #12 in Germany. The non-album single "Stand by Me" was issued in September 1972 b/w "All Day Watcher" from the album. The track "From Heaven from Hell" was re-recorded in 1974 for the B-side of the non-album single "Instant Poetry".

Professional ratings
Review scores
Source	Rating
Allmusic	link

== Track listing ==
All tracks are written by George Kooymans, except "Cruisin' Southern Germany" by Barry Hay.

Side A
No.	Title	Lead Vocals	Length
1.	"All Day Watcher"	George Kooymans	4:49
2.	"Avalanche of Love"	Barry Hay	4:14
3.	"Cruisin' Southern Germany"	Hay	3:00
4.	"Brother Wind"	Hay	7:54
Total length:			20:05

Side B
No.	Title	Lead vocals	Length
5.	"Buddy Joe"	Kooymans	3:48
6.	"Jangalene"	Kooymans	5:08
7.	"From Heaven from Hell"	Kooymans	6:06
8.	"Thousand Feet Below You"	Hay	4:11
Total length:			19:19

== Personnel ==
Golden Earring

- Barry Hay – vocals, flute, saxophone, guitar; lead vocals (2, 3, 4, 8)
- George Kooymans – lead guitar, vocals; lead vocals (1, 5, 6, 7)
- Rinus Gerritsen – bass guitar, keyboards
- Cesar Zuiderwijk – drums

Production

- Fred Haayen – producer
- Frank Owen – recording engineer
- Hans Brethouwer – mastering
- Frits van Swoll – photographs

== Charts ==
Chart (1972)	Peak position
Dutch Albums (Album Top 100)	6
German Albums (Offizielle Top 100)	33
