= Golden Earring (album) =

Studio album by Golden Earring
- Released: September 24, 1970
- Recorded: July 1970
- Studios: Phonogram Studios, Hilversum, Netherlands
- Genres: Hard rock; progressive rock
- Length: 38:40
- Label: Polydor
- Producer: Fred Haayen

Golden Earring chronology
Eight Miles High (1969)	Golden Earring (1970)	Seven Tears (1971)

Singles from Golden Earring
- 1. "Back Home" Released: July 1970

Golden Earring is the sixth album by Dutch rock band Golden Earring, released in 1970 on Polydor Records. Fans may refer to it as the Wall of Dolls due to the cover artwork. This is the first Golden Earring album with drummer Cesar Zuiderwijk as a member. It is also the first release with Barry Hay songwriting credits.

In April 2026, Red Bullet Productions released the eighth installment of their Golden Earring Remastered & Expanded reissue series, supervised by Red Bullet catalog and band archivist Wouter Bessels. The album was remastered from the original first-generation master tapes, and includes three bonus tracks: the US single version of "Back Home" and both sides of the non-album single "Holy Holy Life" b/w "Jessica" from February 1971. New liner notes were written by Golden Earring biographer and archivist Jeroen Ras.

Professional ratings
Review scores
Source	Rating
Allmusic	link

== Track listing ==
All tracks are written by George Kooymans except where noted.

Side A
No.	Title	Writer(s)	Lead Vocals	Length
1.	"Yellow and Blue"		George Kooymans	3:43
2.	"The Loner"		Barry Hay	3:28
3.	"This Is the Time of the Year"		Kooymans	3:32
4.	"Big Tree, Blue Sea"	Kooymans, Barry Hay	Hay	6:09
5.	"The Wall of Dolls"	Marinus Gerritsen, Hay	Hay	3:31
Total length:				20:52

Side B
No.	Title	Writer(s)	Lead Vocals	Length
6.	"Back Home"		Hay	3:50
7.	"See See"	Hay	Hay	3:10
8.	"I'm Going to Send My Pigeons to the Sky"		Hay	5:57
9.	"As Long As the Wind Blows"		Kooymans	5:20
Total length:				18:31

2026 Remastered & Expanded reissue – bonus tracks
No.	Title	Writer(s)	Lead Vocals	Length
10.	"Back Home" (US single version, October 1970)		Hay	3:16
11.	"Holy Holy Life" (A-side, February 1971)		Hay	3:55
12.	"Jessica" (B-side, February 1971)	Gerritsen, Hay	Hay	4:36

== Personnel ==
- Barry Hay – flute, rhythm guitar, vocals; lead vocals (tracks 2, 4–8)
- George Kooymans – lead guitar, vocals; lead vocals (tracks 1, 3, 9)
- Rinus Gerritsen – bass, piano, organ, Mellotron
- Cesar Zuiderwijk – drums, percussion

== Production ==
- Producer: Fred Haayen
- Engineer: Albert Kos
- Photography: Claude Van Heye

== Charts ==
Chart (1970)	Peak position
Dutch Albums (Album Top 100)	1
