= Face It (album) =

Studio album by Golden Earring
- Released: 4 November 1994
- Recorded: 1994
- Genre: Hard Rock
- Length: 43:54
- Label: Columbia
- Producer: Rinus Gerritsen, Barry Hay, George Kooymans, John Sonneveld

Golden Earring chronology
The Naked Truth (1992)	Face It (1994)	Love Sweat (1995)

Face It is an album by Dutch hard rock band Golden Earring, released in 1994. The album was not issued in the U.S.

Professional ratings
Review scores
Source	Rating
Allmusic	link

== Track listing ==
All songs written by Hay and Kooymans except where noted.

1. "Angel" – 3:41
2. "Hold Me Now" – 3:42
3. "Liquid Soul" – 4:06
4. "Minute by Minute" (Gerritsen) – 5:06
5. "Johnny Make Believe" – 4:44
6. "Space Ship" (Hay, Kooymans, E.H. Roelfzema) – 1:59
7. "The Unforgettable Dream" – 3:51
8. "I Can't Do Without Your Kiss" – 4:23
9. "Freedom Don't Last Forever" – 3:34
10. "Maximum Make-Up" (Hay, Kooymans, Roelfzema) – 4:40
11. "Legalize Telepathy" (Hay, Kooymans, Roelfzema) – 4:08

== Personnel ==
- Rinus Gerritsen - bass, guitar, harmonica, keyboard, vocals
- Barry Hay - vocals, guitar
- George Kooymans - guitar, vocals
- Cesar Zuiderwijk - drums, percussion

Additional personnel

- Ton Masseurs - Pedal Steel Guitar on track 8

== Production ==
- Producers: Rinus Gerritsen, Barry Hay, George Kooymans, John Sonneveld
- Engineer: John Sonneveld
- Mixing: John Sonneveld
- Mastering: John Sonneveld

== Charts ==
=== Weekly charts ===
Chart (1994)	Peak position
Dutch Albums (Album Top 100)	6

=== Year-end charts ===
Chart (1994)	Position
Dutch Albums (Album Top 100)	51

== Certifications ==
Region	Certification	Certified units/sales
Netherlands (NVPI)	Platinum	100,000^{^}
^{^} Shipments figures based on certification alone.
