= Millbrook U.S.A. =

Studio album by Golden Earring
- Released: 21 February 2003
- Recorded: 2002–2003
- Studios: Millbrook Sound Studios (Millbrook, NY)
- Genre: Rock
- Length: 53:05
- Label: Universal International
- Producer: Golden Earring

Golden Earring chronology
Last Blast of the Century (2001)	Millbrook U.S.A. (2003)	Naked III (2005)

Millbrook U.S.A. is an album by Dutch hard rock band Golden Earring, released in 2003 (see 2003 in music). It was named after Millbrook, New York, where the band stayed to record the album. Despite this, the album was not issued in the U.S.

== Track listing ==
All tracks are written by George Kooymans and Barry Hay, except where noted.

No.	Title	Writer(s)	Length
1.	"The Hammer of Love"		3:46
2.	"Albino Moon"		3:54
3.	"Skyscraper Hell of a Town"		4:18
4.	"A Sound I Never Heard"	Kooymans, Frank Carillo	4:45
5.	"Better Off Dead"	Kooymans, Carillo	3:55
6.	"Colourblind"		4:10
7.	"On a Night Like You"		3:51
8.	"Kingfisher"		5:19
9.	"Coming in Going Out"	Kooymans, Hay, Carillo	3:08
10.	"The Thief"	Kooymans, Hay, Carillo	3:46
11.	"Beautiful Blue"		4:10
12.	"Love Is a Loser (When Lust Comes Around)"		4:21
13.	"The Last Frontier Hotel"		3:39
Total length:			53:06

== Personnel ==
Golden Earring

- Barry Hay – lead vocal (1–3, 5–8, 10–11), backing vocal (12–13)
- George Kooymans – guitar (1–5, 7–13), backing vocal (1–3, 5, 10, 11), lead vocal (3, 9, 12–13)
- Rinus Gerritsen – bass guitar (1–9, 11–13), Hammond organ (1, 5, 6, 11, 13), harmonica (1, 11), synthesizer (2, 9), piano (6, 7, 11, 13), double bass (10), harmonium (12)
- Cesar Zuiderwijk – drums

Additional personnel

- Frank Carillo – laúd (2, 13), slide guitar (3, 4, 8, 12), tamboura (9), dulcimer (10), harmonium (10), backing vocals (12)
- Birgit Lewis Singers – choir (13)

== Production ==
- Producer: Golden Earring
- Engineer: Chris Cubeta
- Mixing: Paul Orfino
- Mastering: Paul Orfino

== Charts ==
=== Weekly charts ===
Chart (2003)	Peak position
Dutch Albums (Album Top 100)	2

=== Year-end charts ===
Chart (2003)	Position
Dutch Albums (Album Top 100)	80
