= Keeper of the Flame (Golden Earring album) =

Studio album by Golden Earring
- Released: 8 May 1989
- Genres: Arena rock, progressive rock
- Length: 47:27
- Label: Batabak
- Producer: Golden Earring

Golden Earring chronology
The Hole (1986)	Keeper of the Flame (1989)	Bloody Buccaneers (1991)

Professional ratings
Review scores
Source	Rating
AllMusic	2/5 stars

Keeper of the Flame is an album by Dutch hard rock band Golden Earring, released in 1989. The album was not issued in the U.S.

== Track listing ==
All songs written by Hay and Kooymans except where noted.

1. "Can Do That" – 4:23
2. "Too Much Woman (Not Enough Girl)" – 3:47
3. "One Word" – 4:27
4. "Keeper of the Flame" (Gerritsen, Hay) – 6:01
5. "Turn the World Around" – 5:32
6. "Circles" – 4:08
7. "Say My Prayer" – 4:14
8. "Distant Love" (Gerritsen) – 5:11
9. "Nighthawks" – 3:35
10. "My Killer My Shadow" – 6:09

== Personnel ==
- Rinus Gerritsen - bass, keyboard
- Barry Hay - vocals
- George Kooymans - guitar, vocals
- Cesar Zuiderwijk - drums

Additional personnel

- Jantien de Laaf - background vocals
- Tijn Smit - keyboards
- Jacques Van Pol

== Production ==
- Producer: Golden Earring
- Mixing: John Sonneveld
- Art direction: Richard Ottema
- Design: Richard Ottema
- Photography: Rick Arnold

== Charts ==
Chart (1989)	Peak position
Dutch Albums (Album Top 100)	11
