= Bloody Buccaneers =

Studio album by Golden Earring
- Released: 19 April 1991
- Genre: Hard rock
- Length: 43:59
- Label: First Quake
- Producer: Golden Earring; John Sonneveld

Golden Earring chronology
Keeper of the Flame (1989)	Bloody Buccaneers (1991)	The Naked Truth (1992)

Professional ratings
Review scores
Source	Rating
Allmusic	3/5 stars

Bloody Buccaneers is an album by Dutch hard rock band Golden Earring, released in 1991 (see 1991 in music).

== Track listing ==
All songs written by Hay and Kooymans except where noted.

1. "Making Love to Yourself" (Hay, Kooymans, Zuiderwijk) – 4:52
2. "Temporary Madness" – 3:33
3. "Going to the Run" – 3:53
4. "Joe" – 4:37
5. "Planet Blue" – 4:21
6. "Bloody Buccaneers" – 4:49
7. "One Shot Away from Paradise" (Gerritsen) – 3:45
8. "When Love Turns to Pain" (Gerritsen) – 4:47
9. "In a Bad Mood" – 5:23
10. "Pourin' My Heart Out Again" – 3:59

== Personnel ==
Golden Earring

- Barry Hay – vocals
- George Kooymans – guitar, vocals
- Rinus Gerritsen – bass, keyboards
- Cesar Zuiderwijk – drums

== Production ==
- Producers: Golden Earring, John Sonneveld
- Engineer: John Sonneveld
- Design: Sander F. Van Hest
- Cover design: Koos van Oostrom
- Artwork: Koos van Oostrom, Sander F. Van Hest
- Illustrations: Koos O., Sander F. Van Hest
- Photography: Kees Tabak(nl)

== Cover versions ==
Russian heavy metal band Aria covered the song "Going to the Run" with adapted lyrics in Russian ("Беспечный ангел" by Margarita Pushkina). It was first released in 1999 and then in 2004 (on the eponymous ballad compilation).

== Charts ==
Chart (1991)	Peak position
Dutch Albums (Album Top 100)	3

== Certifications ==
Region	Certification	Certified units/sales
Netherlands (NVPI)	Gold	50,000^{^}
^{^} Shipments figures based on certification alone.
