= Miracle Mirror =

Studio album by Golden Earring
- Released: 1968
- Genre: Psychedelic rock
- Length: 34:05
- Label: Polydor
- Producer: Fred Haayen

Golden Earring chronology
Winter-Harvest (1967)	Miracle Mirror (1968)	On the Double (1969)

Singles from Miracle Mirror
- 1. "I've Just Lost Somebody" Released: April 1968; 2. "The Truth About Arthur" Released: 1968 (Germany)

Professional ratings
Review scores
Source	Rating
Allmusic	3.5/5 stars

Miracle Mirror is the third studio album by Dutch rock band Golden Earring, released in 1968 on Polydor Records. This is the first Golden Earring album to include lead vocalist Barry Hay.

The 2009 reissue includes A- and B-sides of singles released before and after the album's release. These include the last session with original vocalist Frans Krassenburg on "Sound of the Screaming Day" (who sings backing vocals), while its B-side was the first release with new singer Barry Hay.

== Track listing ==
=== Original track listing ===
All tracks are written by Marinus Gerritsen and George Kooymans.

Side 1
No.	Title	Lead vocals	Length
1.	"The Truth About Arthur"	Barry Hay	2:54
2.	"Circus Will Be in Town in Time"	George Kooymans	3:25
3.	"Crystal Heaven"	Hay	3:50
4.	"Sam and Sue"	Hay, Kooymans	1:41
5.	"I've Just Lost Somebody"	Hay	3:05
6.	"Mr. Fortune's Wife"	Hay	3:15
Total length:			18:19

Side 2
No.	Title	Lead vocals	Length
7.	"Who Cares?"	Hay	3:44
8.	"Born a Second Time"	Hay	2:38
9.	"Magnificent Magistral"	Kooymans	2:43
10.	"Must I Cry?"	Kooymans	2:16
11.	"Nothing Can Change This World of Mine"	Hay	3:22
12.	"Gipsy Rhapsody"	Kooymans	3:19
Total length:			18:19

=== 2009 CD reissue bonus tracks ===
No.	Title	Original release	Length
13.	"Sound of the Screaming Day"	A-side of non-album single (July 1967)	2:51
14.	"She Won’t Come to Me"	B-side of "Sound of the Screaming Day" single (July 1967)	2:32
15.	"Together We Live, Together We Love"	A-side of non-album single (October 1967)	3:09
16.	"I Wonder"	B-side of "Together We Live, Together We Love" single (October 1967)	3:37
17.	"Dong-Dong-Di-Ki-Di-Gi-Dong"	A-side of non-album single (July 1968)	3:00
18.	"Wake - Up Breakfast!"	B-side of "Dong-Dong-Di-Ki-Di-Gi-Dong" single (July 1968)	2:49
19.	"Just a Little Bit of Peace in My Heart"	A-side of single (November 1968)	5:18
20.	"Remember My Friend"	B-side of "Just a Little Bit of Peace in My Heart" single (November 1968)	3:00

== Personnel ==
Golden Earrings

- Barry Hay – vocals, flute, rhythm guitar; lead vocals (1, 3–7, 9, 11, 14, 16, 18, 20)
- George Kooymans – lead guitar, vocals; lead vocals (2, 4–6, 8, 10, 12, 13, 15, 17, 19)
- Rinus Gerritsen – bass, keyboard
- Jaap Eggermont – drums
- Frans Krassenburg – backing vocal (13)

Production

- Fred Haayen – producer
- Jan Audier – recording engineer, mixing
- Nico van der Stam – photography
