= Winter-Harvest =

Winter-harvest

Studio album by Golden Earring
- Released: January 27, 1967
- Recorded: Winter 1966
- Genres: Nederbeat; pop rock
- Length: 35:15
- Label: Polydor
- Producer: Fred Haayen

Golden Earring chronology
Just Ear-rings (1965)	Winter-harvest (1967)	Miracle Mirror (1968)

Singles from Winter-Harvest
- 1. "In My House" Released: March 1967

Professional ratings
Review scores
Source	Rating
Allmusic	4/5 stars

Winter-Harvest is the second album by Dutch beat band Golden Earrings, released in 1967. Note that Frans Krassenberg, after this record, would leave the band. He was replaced by Barry Hay.

== Track listing ==
=== Original track listing ===
All tracks are written by Marinus Gerritsen and George Kooymans.

Side 1
No.	Title	Lead vocals	Length
1.	"Another Man in Town"	Franz Krassenburg	2:22
2.	"Smoking Cigarettes"	George Kooymans	2:19
3.	"In My House"	Krassenburg	3:57
4.	"Don't Wanna Lose That Girl"	Krassenburg	2:15
5.	"Impeccable Girl"	Kooymans	2:14
6.	"Tears and Lies"	Krassenburg	2:00
7.	"You've Got the Intention to Hurt Me"	Kooymans	3:06
Total length:			18:17

Side 2
No.	Title	Lead vocals	Length
8.	"Dream"	Krassenburg	2:39
9.	"You Break My Heart"	Krassenburg	2:00
10.	"Baby Don't Make Me Nervous"	Kooymans	2:25
11.	"Call Me"	Krassenburg	2:17
12.	"Happy and Young Together"	Krassenburg	3:04
13.	"Lionel the Miser"	Kooymans	2:29
14.	"There Will Be a Tomorrow"	Krassenburg	2:19
Total length:			17:08

=== CD reissue bonus tracks ===
No.	Title	Original release	Length
15.	"Daddy Buy Me a Girl"	A-side single (October 1966)	2:42
16.	"What You Gonna Tell"	B-side of "Daddy Buy Me a Girl" single (October 1966)	1:44
17.	"Don't Run Too Far"	A-side single (December 1966)	2:15
18.	"Wings"	B-side of "Don't Run Too Far" single (December 1966)	2:10

== Personnel ==
Golden Earrings

- Frans Krassenburg – vocals
- George Kooymans – guitar, vocals
- Rinus Gerritsen – bass, piano
- Jaap Eggermont – drums

Additional personnel

- Cees Schrama – piano, organ, vibes
- Fred Haayen – production
- J.R. Audier – engineer
- Hermann Kooymans – photographs
