= Just Ear-rings =

Studio album by The Golden Earrings
- Released: 1965
- Recorded: August & October 1965
- Studios: Phonogram Studios, Hilversum, Netherlands
- Genres: Nederbeat; pop rock
- Length: 26:16
- Label: Polydor
- Producer: Fred Haayen

The Golden Earrings chronology
Just Ear-rings (1965)	Winter-Harvest (1967)

Singles from Just Ear-rings
- 1. "Please Go" Released: September 1965; 2. "Lonely Everyday" Released: 1965 (Note: this single was quickly withdrawn, only few copies remain)

Professional ratings
Review scores
Source	Rating
Allmusic	3.5/5 stars

Just Ear-rings is the 1965 debut album by Dutch Nederbeat band Golden Earring (formerly The Golden Earrings).

== Track listing ==
=== Original track listing ===
All tracks are written by Marinus Gerritsen and George Kooymans, except where noted.

Side 1
No.	Title	Writer(s)	Lead vocals	Length
1.	"Nobody but You"		Frans Krassenburg with George Kooymans	2:18
2.	"I Hate Saying These Words"		Krassenburg with Kooymans	2:17
3.	"She May Be"	Kooymans	Krassenburg with Kooymans	1:47
4.	"Holy Witness"	Kooymans	Kooymans	2:47
5.	"No Need to Worry"	Gerritsen	Krassenburg with Kooymans	2:04
6.	"Please Go"		Kooymans	2:56
Total length:				14:13

Side 2
No.	Title	Writer(s)	Lead vocals	Length
7.	"Sticks and Stones"	Titus Turner	Krassenburg with Kooymans	1:41
8.	"I Am a Fool"	Gerritsen	Krassenburg	2:06
9.	"Don't Stay Away"		Kooymans with Krassenburg	2:10
10.	"Lonely Everyday"		Kooymans with Krassenburg	1:42
11.	"When People Talk"		Kooymans with Krassenburg	2:47
12.	"Now I Have"	Kooymans	Kooymans with Krassenburg	1:38
Total length:				12:15

=== 2002 CD reissue bonus tracks ===
All tracks are written by Gerritsen and Kooymans, except "Chuck of Steel" by Gerritsen, Kooymans, Peter de Ronde, and "Smoking Cigarettes" by Kooymans.

No.	Title	Original release	Length
13.	"Chunk of Steel"	B-side of "Please Go" single (1965)	2:25
14.	"The Words I Need"	B-side of "That Day" single (1966)	2:14
15.	"Waiting for You"	B-side of "If You Leave Me" single (1966)	2:25
16.	"What You Gonna Tell"	B-side of "Daddy Buy Me a Girl" single (1966)	1:47
17.	"Wings"	B-side of "Don't Run Too Far" single (1966)	2:12
18.	"Smoking Cigarettes"	Winter Harvest album (1967)	2:19

=== 2009 CD reissue bonus tracks ===
All tracks are written by Gerritsen and Kooymans, except "Chuck of Steel" by Gerritsen, Kooymans, Peter de Ronde.

No.	Title	Original release	Length
13.	"Chunk of Steel"	B-side of "Please Go" single (1965)	2:25
14.	"That Day"	A-side single (1966)	2:28
15.	"The Words I Need"	B-side of "That Day" single (1966)	2:14
16.	"If You Leave Me"	A-side single (1966)	2:15
17.	"Waiting for You"	B-side of "If You Leave Me" single (1966)	2:24

== Personnel ==
The Golden Ear-rings

- Frans Krassenburg – vocals
- George Kooymans – guitar, vocals
- Peter de Ronde – rhythm guitar
- Rinus Gerritsen – bass, keyboard
- Jaap Eggermont – drums

Additional personnel

- Aat den Dulk – organ, spinet
- Fred Haayen – production
- Arie Merkt – production
- Jos Ditman – engineer
