= On the Double =

On the Double may refer to:

- On the Double (film), a 1961 film starring Danny Kaye
- On the Double (album), a 1969 double album by Golden Earring
- "On the Double", a song by Snoop Dogg from 220
