= To the Hilt (album) =

Studio album by Golden Earring
- Released: January 1976
- Recorded: 1975
- Genres: Hard rock; progressive rock; art rock
- Length: 44:11
- Labels: Polydor (Europe); MCA (U.S.)
- Producer: Golden Earring

Golden Earring chronology
Switch (1975)	To the Hilt (1976)	Contraband (1976)

Singles from To the Hilt
- 1. "Sleepwalkin'" Released: January 1976; 2. "To the Hilt" Released: June 1976

Professional ratings
Review scores
Source	Rating
AllMusic	2/5 stars

To the Hilt is the eleventh studio album by Dutch rock band Golden Earring, released in 1976.

== Track listing ==
All tracks are written by George Kooymans and Barry Hay, except "Why Me?" by Kooymans, Hay, John Fenton.

Side A
No.	Title	Length
1.	"Why Me?"	7:13
2.	"Facedancer"	4:09
3.	"To the Hilt"	3:07
4.	"Nomad"	7:06
Total length:		21:44

Side B
No.	Title	Length
5.	"Sleepwalkin'"	5:00
6.	"Latin Lightning"	7:15
7.	"Violins"	10:21
Total length:		22:41

== Personnel ==
Golden Earring

- Barry Hay – vocals
- George Kooymans – guitar, vocals
- Rinus Gerritsen – bass
- Cesar Zuiderwijk – drums, percussion
- Robert Jan Stips – keyboards, ARP and Mood synthesizers, string arrangement on "Violins"

Additional musician

- Chris Mercer – tenor saxophone on "Sleepwalkin'" and "Latin Lightning"

=== Production ===
- Producer: Golden Earring
- Executive producer: Fred Haayen
- Engineer: John Kriek
- Assistant engineer: Robert Ash
- Concept: George Hardie
- Photography: Richard Manning

== Charts ==
Chart (1976)	Peak position
Dutch Albums (Album Top 100)	3
Swedish Albums (Sverigetopplistan)	46
US Billboard 200	156
