= Live 2 =

Live 2, or Live II, or Live Two may refer to:

- Live Two, a 2003 album by Coil
- Live II, a 2007 album by Foghat
- 2nd Live, a 1981 album by Golden Earring

== See also ==
- Alive II, a 1977 album by Kiss
- Alive 2, a 2005 album by Anthrax
