= Seven Tears =

Studio album by Golden Earring
- Released: August 1971
- Recorded: Late winter – spring 1971
- Studios: Phongram Studios, Hilversum, Netherlands
- Genres: Hard rock; progressive rock
- Length: 35:18
- Label: Polydor
- Producer: Fred Haayen

Golden Earring chronology
Golden Earring (1970)	Seven Tears (1971)	Together (1972)

Singles from Seven Tears
- 1. "She Flies on Strange Wings" Released: September 1971

Seven Tears is the seventh studio album by Dutch rock band Golden Earring, released in 1971 on Polydor Records. The album was not issued in the U.S.

"She Flies on Strange Wings" was issued as a single. The band refused to edit down the 7:22 album version and decided to cut the track in two at the 4:31, and release it as Part 1 & 2 on two sides of a single.

Professional ratings
Review scores
Source	Rating
Allmusic	link

== Track listing ==
All tracks are written by George Kooymans, except where noted.

Side A
No.	Title	Writer(s)	Lead vocals	Length
1.	"Silver Ships"		George Kooymans	5:40
2.	"The Road Swallowed Her Name"		Barry Hay	4:07
3.	"Hope"	Barry Hay, Marinus Gerritsen	Hay	4:46
4.	"Don't Worry"	Hay	Hay	3:20
Total length:				17:59

Side B
No.	Title	Lead vocals	Length
5.	"She Flies on Strange Wings"	Hay, Kooymans (Intro)	7:22
6.	"This Is the Other Side of Life"	Kooymans	3:19
7.	"You're Better Off Free"	Kooymans	6:44
Total length:			17:28

== Personnel ==
Golden Earring

- Barry Hay – rhythm guitar, flute, vocals; lead vocals (2–5, 7)
- George Kooymans – lead guitar, vocals; lead vocals (1, 6)
- Rinus Gerritsen – bass guitar, organ, piano, ARP synthesizer
- Cesar Zuiderwijk – drums, percussion

Additional musician

- Bertus Borgers – saxophone (3, 5)

Production

- Fred Haayen – producer
- Albert Kos – record engineer
- Pieter Nieboer – record engineer
- Jan Bogaerts – front cover photography, design
- Claude van Heye – inside photography

== Charts ==
Chart (1971)	Peak position
Dutch Albums (Album Top 100)	1
