= On the Double (album) =

Studio album by Golden Earring
- Released: April 1969
- Recorded: February 1968 - February 1969
- Studio: Phonogram Studios, Hilversum, Netherlands
- Genre: Rock
- Length: 65:47
- Label: Polydor
- Producer: Fred Haayen

Golden Earring chronology
| Miracle Mirror (1968) | On the Double (1969) | Eight Miles High (1969) |

Singles from On the Double
- 1. "Just a Little Bit of Peace in My Heart" Released: November 1968

Professional ratings
Review scores
| Source | Rating |
|---|---|
| Allmusic | 3/5 stars |

On the Double is the fourth studio album and first double album by Dutch rock band Golden Earrings, released in 1969 on Polydor Records. It was the last album released under the name Golden Earrings as well as the last to feature drummer Jaap Eggermont, who left to pursue a career as a record producer, ultimately creating Stars on 45.

On the Double is a sprawling record including many different styles, including psychedelic rock ("Song of a Devil's Servant"), baroque pop and orchestral ballads ("Angelina", "Just a Little Bit of Peace in My Heart"), acoustic folk ("Judy", "Murdock 9-6182") and hard rock ("Backbiting Baby").

In November 2025, Red Bullet Productions released their seventh installment of their Golden Earring Remastered & Expanded reissues, overseen by band archivist Wouter Bessels. The album was remastered from the original master tapes, and includes bonus tracks of their two non-album singles and B-sides from the period: "Dong-Dong-Di-Ki-Di-Gi-Dong" from July 1968, and "Where Will I Be" from August 1969.

== Track listing ==
All tracks are written by George Kooymans, except tracks 6, 10, 12, 19 by Marinus Gerritsen, and tracks 20–21 by Kooymans, Gerritsen.

Side A
| No. | Title | Lead vocals | Length |
|---|---|---|---|
| 1. | "Song of a Devil's" | Barry Hay | 3:45 |
| 2. | "Angelina" | George Kooymans | 3:11 |
| 3. | "Pam Pam Poope Poope Loux" | Hay | 2:44 |
| 4. | "Hurry, Hurry, Hurry" | Kooymans | 4:23 |
| Total length: | | | 14:07 |

Side B
| No. | Title | Lead vocals | Length |
|---|---|---|---|
| 5. | "My Baby Ruby" | Kooymans | 3:18 |
| 6. | "Judy" | Hay | 1:44 |
| 7. | "Goodbye Mama" | Hay | 3:09 |
| 8. | "Murdock 9-6182" | Kooymans | 3:12 |
| 9. | "Just a Little Bit of Peace in My Heart" | Kooymans | 5:20 |
| Total length: | | | 16:45 |

Side C
| No. | Title | Lead vocals | Length |
|---|---|---|---|
| 10. | "The Sad Story of Sam Stone" | Kooymans, Hay | 2:26 |
| 11. | "High in the Sky" | Kooymans | 3:22 |
| 12. | "Remember My Friend" | Hay | 2:57 |
| 13. | "Time Is a Book" | Kooymans | 4:06 |
| 14. | "Backbiting Baby" | Hay | 5:37 |
| Total length: | | | 18:31 |

Side D
| No. | Title | Lead vocals | Length |
|---|---|---|---|
| 15. | "I'm a Runnin'" | Hay | 3:27 |
| 16. | "I Sing My Song" | Kooymans | 4:00 |
| 17. | "Mitch Mover" | Hay | 3:00 |
| 18. | "God Bless the Day" | Hay | 2:40 |
| 19. | "The Grand Piano" | Hay | 3:26 |
| Total length: | | | 16:38 |

2025 Remastered & Expanded reissue – bonus tracks
| No. | Title | Lead vocals | Length |
|---|---|---|---|
| 20. | "Dong-Dong-Di-Ki-Di-Gi-Dong" (A-side, July 1968 / stereo version) | Kooymans | 3:06 |
| 21. | "Wake Up - Breakfast!" (B-side, July 1968 / stereo version) | Hay | 2:53 |
| 22. | "Where Will I Be" (A-side, August 1969) | Kooymans | 3:51 |
| 23. | "It's Alright, But I Admit It Could Be Better" (B-side, August 1969) | Hay | 3:40 |

== Personnel ==
Golden Earrings

- Barry Hay – vocals, flute, rhythm guitar, percussion, inner sleeve design
- George Kooymans – electric guitar, acoustic guitar, vocals
- Rinus Gerritsen – bass guitar, organ, piano
- Jaap Eggermont – drums, percussion

Additional musicians

- Cees Schrama – additional keyboards
- Frans Mijts – orchestral arrangements
- Niko Venneker – saxophone

Production

- Fred Haayen – producer
- Gerard Beckers – sound engineer
- Wil Luikinga – sound engineer
- Niko Venneker – cover photography
- Ronnie Hertz – inner photography
- Claude van Heye – inner photography
- Ronnie Seubert – inner photography
- Wouter Bessels – production, research, remastering (2025 reissue)
- Wout de Kruif – tape transfers (2025 reissue)

== Charts ==
| Chart (1969) | Peak position |
|---|---|
| Dutch Albums (Album Top 100) | 4 |
