= Oh Well =

Oh Well may refer to:

- Oh Well (band), a German dance group that started in the late 1980s
- Oh Well (album), an album by Insomniac Folklore
- Oh Well (card game), the original version of the card game, Oh Hell!

== Songs ==
- "Oh Well" (Ariana Grande song), 2026
- "Oh Well" (Fleetwood Mac song), 1969, covered by several other artists
- "Oh Well", a song by Boyz II Men from their 2002 album Full Circle
- "Oh Well", a song by Depeche Mode from their 2009 album Sounds of the Universe (bonus track)
- "Oh Well", a song by Fiona Apple from her 2005 album Extraordinary Machine
- "Oh Well", a song by Snake River Conspiracy from their 2000 album Sonic Jihad
