= Frank Carillo =

American rock musician

Frank Carillo (born July 14, 1950) is an American rock musician. In 1971, manager Phil Lorito formed a band around Frank Carillo called Doc Holliday, with Carillo, Bob Mayo, Tom Arlotta, and Bob Liggio. In 1973 they released one album, Doc Holliday.

== Projects ==
=== Carillo (1978-1979) ===
Under his own name, Carillo released two albums, including a cover of the Rolling Stones song "Out of Time" on his 1979 album Street Of Dreams.

- Rings Around The Moon (1978)
- Street Of Dreams (1979)

=== Golden-Carillo (1990-1997) ===
Carillo partnered with Annie Golden to form a band, Golden-Carillo. They released three albums together:

- A Fire in New Town (1992)
- Toxic Emotion (1993)
- Back For More (1997)

=== Frank Carillo and the Bandoleros (2001-present) ===
As of 2006, after reuniting with their former manager, Phil Lorito, Carillo put together his new band, Frank Carillo And The Bandoleros. Members are Frank Carillo, Eddie Seville, Karl Allweier and Norman DelTufo. They have released three albums:

- Bad Out There (2004)
- Someday (2008)
- Rails to Kingdom Come (2011)

=== Kooymans / Carillo (2010-2022) ===
Frank Carillo and George Kooymans from Golden Earring are longtime friends. They have been writing together on and off since the mid-1990s. In April 2010, this resulted in their first album, On Location which featured the lead off single Blind Love written by American Songwriter Eddie Seville. In 2022 they released the album Mirage, which was recorded over a number of years before Kooyman's ALS diagnosis left him unable to play and forced his band Golden Earring to retire.

=== Carillo / Seville (2017-present) ===
Frank Carillo and Eddie Seville began writing, recording and touring Europe as an acoustic duo in 2010, playing a mix of each other's work as well as co-writes. Their debut record Knocking On Your Door was released in 2020 and was produced by Paul Orofino at Millbrook Sound Studios.

== Sessions ==
Carillo has also contributed session work and co-written songs for:

- Wind of Change (1972, Peter Frampton)
- Frampton's Camel (1973, Peter Frampton)
- Another Passenger (1976, Carly Simon)
- Spy (1979, Carly Simon)
- Up Your Alley (1988, Joan Jett and the Blackhearts)
- Westworld (1999, Westworld)
- Millbrook U.S.A. (2003, Golden Earring)
- Together Alone (Anouk)
- Caroline Doctorow (several albums)
- Midnight Blue (Twiggy)
- Ready For Love (John Hammond, Jr.)
- Tits 'n Ass (Golden Earring) (2011, Golden Earring)

== Various ==
Carillo is mentioned in the Ian Hunter song "Central Park West". This song was on the Short Back 'n' Sides album.
