= Cut (Golden Earring album) =

Studio album by Golden Earring
- Released: 10 September 1982
- Genre: Pop rock
- Length: 38:35
- Labels: Capitol, 21/Polygram (US) Mercury
- Producer: Shell Schellekens

Golden Earring chronology
2nd Live (1981)	Cut (1982)	N.E.W.S. (1984)

Singles from Cut
- 1. "Twilight Zone" Released: 23 August 1982; 2. "The Devil Made Me Do It" Released: 17 December 1982

Professional ratings
Review scores
Source	Rating
AllMusic	3/5 stars

Cut is the sixteenth studio album by Dutch rock band Golden Earring, released in 1982 (see 1982 in music). The album spawned the hit song "Twilight Zone," which reached No. 1 in the Netherlands and No. 1 in the United States on Billboard's Hot Mainstream Rock Tracks (it reached No. 10 on the Billboard Hot 100.)

The album's cover image is the 1964 photo Cutting the Card Quickly taken by M.I.T. Professor "Doc" Edgerton showing the jack of diamonds playing card being shredded by a bullet. The image is recreated repeatedly in the music video of "Twilight Zone" in which the card represents the life of the rogue espionage agent.

== Track listing ==
All tracks are written by Barry Hay and George Kooymans, except where noted.

No.	Title	Writer(s)	Length
1.	"The Devil Made Me Do It"		3:25
2.	"Future"	Kooymans	5:25
3.	"Baby Dynamite"	Hay	5:15
4.	"Last of the Mochicans"		4:09
5.	"Lost and Found"	Rinus Gerritsen, Hay	4:00
6.	"Twilight Zone"	Kooymans	7:58
7.	"Chargin' Up My Batteries"		4:17
8.	"Secrets"	Hay	4:04
Total length:			38:35

2023 remastered and expanded edition bonus tracks
No.	Title	Length
9.	"Twilight Zone" (7" single version)	4:47
10.	"King Dark"	3:32
11.	"The Devil Made Me Do It" (7" single version)	3:18
12.	"Shadow Avenue"	3:51
13.	"The Devil Made Me Do It" (7" US single censored version)	3:33

2023 remastered and expanded edition CD 2: The Cut Sessions
No.	Title	Length
1.	"Future" (Early Version 11-81)	4:46
2.	"Twilight Zone" (Early Version 11-81)	5:46
3.	"Don't Be Silly" (Monitor Mix 1-82)	3:23
4.	"Lost and Found" (Instrumental Early Mix 2-82)	4:35
5.	"Future" (Alternate Lyrics Version 2-82)	4:06
6.	"Twilight Zone" (Early Mix 2-82)	8:09
7.	"Chargin' Up My Batteries" (Early Mix 2-82)	4:47
8.	"King Dark" (Early Mix 2-82)	3:21
9.	"Last of the Mochicans" (Early Version 2-82)	4:32
10.	"Jazz - Shadow Avenue" (Basic Track 2-82)	4:05
11.	"Secrets" (Early Mix 5-82)	4:02
12.	"The Devil Made Me Do It" (Early Mix 6-82)	3:28
13.	"Baby Dynamite" (Early Mix 6-82)	6:04
14.	"Twilight Zone" (Instrumental Early Mix 2-82)	8:05

== Personnel ==
Golden Earring

- Barry Hay – lead vocals, guitars
- George Kooymans – electric guitar, acoustic guitar, synthesizer guitar, lead vocals
- Rinus Gerritsen – bass guitar, Chapman Stick, keyboards
- Cesar Zuiderwijk – drums, percussion

Additional musicians

- Shell Schellekens – additional percussion, synthesizers and sound effects
- Robert Jan Stips – synthesizer on "Baby Dynamite" and "Chargin' Up My Batteries"
- Street choirs on "Twilight Zone" & "The Devil Made Me Do It" (album cut) by:
  - Steve Clisby (American Gypsy) – backup vocals
  - Omar Dupree (American Gypsy) – backup vocals
  - Evert Nieuwstede (Urban Heroes) – backup vocals
- Hans Hollestelle – horn arrangements on "The Devil Made Me Do It"

Production

- Producer – Shell Schellekens
- Engineer – John Kriek
- Digital mastering – Dick Van Leeuwen
- Horn arrangements – Hans Hollestelle
- Photography – Harold Edgerton, Kees Tabak
- Lettering – Koos O.

== Charts ==
Chart (1982–1983)	Peak position
Canada Top Albums/CDs (RPM)	18
Dutch Albums (Album Top 100)	1
US Billboard 200	24

== Certifications ==
Region	Certification	Certified units/sales
Canada (Music Canada)	Gold	50,000^{^}
Netherlands (NVPI)	Gold	50,000^{^}
^{^} Shipments figures based on certification alone.

== Release history ==
Country	Date
Netherlands	September 1982
United States	November 1982
United Kingdom	February 1983
