= The Devil Made Me Do It (disambiguation) =

"The Devil Made Me Do It" is a catchphrase coined by the American comedian Flip Wilson in the early 1970s while in the character of his persona Geraldine Jones.

The Devil Made Me Do It may also refer to:

- The Devil Made Me Do It, a 1990 hip-hop album by Paris.
- The Conjuring: The Devil Made Me Do It, a 2021 horror film
- "The Devil Made Me Do It", a 2011 single by Against All Will
- "The Devil Made Me Do It", a 1983 single by Golden Earring: see Golden Earring discography
- "The Devil Made Me Do It", a song by My Bloody Valentine from the 1985 album Man You Love to Hate – Live
- The Devil Made Me Do It, a 2012 album by Scum of the Earth (band)
- "The Devil Made Me Do It", a 2006 single by Thunder from the album Robert Johnson's Tombstone
- "The Devil Made Me Do It", an episode in season 5 of the American sitcom Full House: see Full House (season 5)
- Trial of Arne Cheyenne Johnson, otherwise known as the "Devil Made Me Do It" case, the first known court case in the United States where the defendant claimed a demonic possession
