= Eight Miles High (album) =

Studio album by Golden Earring
- Released: 17 November 1969
- Genre: Hard rock; progressive rock; psychedelic rock
- Length: 37:51
- Label: Polydor (Europe); Atlantic (US)
- Producer: Fred Haayen

Golden Earring chronology
On the Double (1969)	Eight Miles High (1969)	Golden Earring (1970)

Professional ratings
Review scores
Source	Rating
Allmusic	4/5 stars

Eight Miles High is the fifth studio album by Dutch rock band Golden Earring, released in 1969 on Polydor Records in Europe and Atlantic in the US. It was the first album released under the name The Golden Earring (formerly Golden Earrings) and the only album with drummer Sieb Warner.

== Track listing ==
All tracks are written by George Kooymans, except where noted.

No.	Title	Writer(s)	Length
1.	"Landing"	Marinus Gerritsen	4:27
2.	"Song of a Devil's Servant"		6:00
3.	"One Huge Road"		3:05
4.	"Everyday's Torture"		5:19
5.	"Eight Miles High"	Gene Clark, Roger McGuinn, David Crosby	19:00

2023 Remastered & Expanded reissue – bonus tracks
No.	Title	Writer(s)	Length
6.	"Another 45 Miles" (A-side, November 1969)		4:49
7.	"I Can't Get a Hold of Her" (B-side, November 1969)		6:17
8.	"Eight Miles High" (Mono single version)	Clark, McGuinn, Crosby	2:25

Note: "Another 45 Miles" and "I Can't Get a Hold of Her" were both sides of a non-album 1969 single, recorded during a short session separate from the Eight Miles High album sessions. No singles were issued from Eight Miles High, except in the U.S., where an edit of "Eight Miles High" was issued without the band's consent.

== Personnel ==
- Barry Hay – flute (2), rhythm guitar, vocals; lead vocals (tracks 1, 2, 4)
- George Kooymans – lead guitar, vocals; lead vocals (tracks 3, 5)
- Rinus Gerritsen – bass, organ, piano
- Sieb Warner – drums; percussion (2)
