= John Lagrand =

John Lagrand may refer to:

- John Lagrand (politician) (1849–?), Republican member of the Wisconsin State Assembly from Milwaukee
- John Lagrand (musician) (1949–2005), Dutch musician
