= Oh Well (band) =

German dance group

Oh Well was a German dance group active in the late 1980s to early 1990s. Their record producers were Alexander Henninger and Achim Völker. They were relatively successful during their peak in 1989, but broke up soon after, due to a lack of further chart success.

The group had two UK chart singles in 1989 and 1990: the eponymous "Oh Well", a dance cover of the 1969 Fleetwood Mac song of the same name, released in late 1989. It peaked at number 28 on the UK Singles Chart for two weeks in October 1989. Their second single, a cover of Golden Earring's "Radar Love", was released in early 1990, and peaked at number 65 on 3 March 1990.

== Discography ==
=== Albums ===
- First Album (1989)
- Get Ready (1991)

=== Singles ===
- "Oh Well" (1989) - UK #28, NZ #40
- "Radar Love" (1990) - UK #65
- "I'll Be Forever Your Man" (1990)
- "Dance to the Music (Twist and Shout)" (featuring Randal Sneed) (1991)
- "Quiet" (1991)
