= Moontan =

Studio album by Golden Earring
- Released: August 1973
- Studio: Phonogram (Hilversum)
- Genres: Hard rock; progressive rock
- Length: 40:19; 39:41 (US version)
- Labels: Polydor; Track; MCA
- Producer: Golden Earring

Golden Earring chronology
Together (1972)	Moontan (1973)	Switch (1975)

Alternative cover
- United States rerelease cover

Singles from Moontan
- 1. "Radar Love" Released: August 1973; 2. "Candy's Going Bad" Released: October 1974 (US)

Professional ratings
Review scores
Source	Rating
AllMusic	4/5 stars
Classic Rock	3.5/5 stars
Christgau's Record Guide	C+

Moontan is the ninth studio album by Dutch rock band Golden Earring, first released in August 1973 through Polydor internationally, Track Records in the United Kingdom, and MCA Records in the United States. It contains the radio hit "Radar Love". Moontan is the band's most successful album in the United States, being the only Golden Earring album to be certified Gold by the RIAA.

"Vanilla Queen" twice samples Marilyn Monroe's character in There's No Business Like Show Business: "Well, in simple English I'm..." from the "Lazy" performance and "What's your name, Honey?" from the "Heat Wave" performance.

== Track listing ==
All tracks are written by George Kooymans and Barry Hay, except where noted.

Original track listing
No.	Title	Writer(s)	Length
1.	"Candy's Going Bad"		6:12
2.	"Are You Receiving Me"	Kooymans, Hay, John Fenton	9:31
3.	"Suzy Lunacy (Mental Rock)"		4:24
4.	"Radar Love"		6:26
5.	"Just Like Vince Taylor"		4:33
6.	"Vanilla Queen"		9:16
Total length:			40:19

US/UK track listing
No.	Title	Writer(s)	Length
1.	"Radar Love"		6:26
2.	"Candy's Going Bad"		6:12
3.	"Vanilla Queen"		9:20
4.	"Big Tree, Blue Sea"		8:13
5.	"Are You Receiving Me"	Kooymans, Hay, Fenton	9:32
Total length:			39:41

This is also the track listing on the original UK vinyl release (see above), as well as on early U.S. LP pressings (Track/MCA 396). The U.S. version of the album was originally issued with the UK "exotic dancer" cover with Jilly Johnson, but this was quickly withdrawn and replaced with the "earring" cover depicted at right.

In September 2021, Moontan Remastered & Expanded, a new 2CD edition of the 1973 classic album, was released, featuring the original album newly remastered for the first time from the first-generation master tapes, and featuring six bonus tracks, nine previously unreleased mixes/different versions, a 32-page booklet with a new essay, memorabilia, and photos.

2021 remastered edition bonus tracks (CD1)
No.	Title	Writer(s)	Length
7.	"Big Tree, Blue Sea" (1973 version; replaced "Suzy Lunacy" and "Just Like Vince Taylor" on UK/US 1973 releases)		8:12
8.	"Candy's Going Bad" (single version)		2:52
9.	"Radar Love" (single version)		3:45
10.	"The Song Is Over" ("Radar Love" B-side in continental Europe)	Kooymans	4:52
11.	"Instant Poetry" (single A-side, 1974)		5:08
12.	"From Heaven, from Hell" (1974 version; "Instant Poetry" B-side)	Kooymans	6:05

2021 remastered edition CD 2: The Moontan Sessions
No.	Title	Length
1.	"Vanilla Queen" (early version)	10:03
2.	"Radar Love" (basic track)	6:27
3.	"The Song Is Over" (basic track)	5:14
4.	"Are You Receiving Me" (basic track)	9:30
5.	"Candy's Going Bad" (rough mix)	4:06
6.	"Vanilla Queen Part 1" (rough mix)	5:36
7.	"Just Like Vince Taylor" (alternate mix)	4:27
8.	"Big Tree, Blue Sea Part 1" (rough mix)	3:14
9.	"Radar Love" (instrumental mono mix)	6:30

== Personnel ==
- Barry Hay — lead vocals, flute, saxophone, backing vocals, percussion, sound effects
- George Kooymans — electric and acoustic guitars, lead vocals, backing vocals, sound effects
- Rinus Gerritsen — bass guitar, minimoog, ARP 2500 synthesizer, piano, organ, accordion, sound effects
- Cesar Zuiderwijk — drums, percussion

Additional personnel

- Patricia Paay — backing vocals
- Bertus Borgers — saxophone
- Eelco Gelling — slide guitar on "Radar Love"

== Production ==
- Producer: Golden Earring
- Executive Producer: Fred Haayen
- Engineer: Pieter Nieboer
- Engineer: Damon Lyon-Shaw (mixing), IBC Studios, London, England
- Arranger: Golden Earring

== Charts ==
Chart (1973–1974)	Peak position
Australian Albums (Kent Music Report)	13
Canada Top Albums/CDs (RPM)	15
Dutch Albums (Album Top 100)	1
UK Albums (Official Charts)	24
US Billboard 200	12

== Certifications ==
Region	Certification	Certified units/sales
Canada (Music Canada)	Gold	50,000^{^}
United States (RIAA)	Gold	500,000^{^}
^{^} Shipments figures based on certification alone.

== Accolades ==
Rankings for Moontan
Year	Organization	Accolade	Rank
2021	Lust For Life Magazine	The 15 best Dutch albums of all Time	1
2019	Oor	The Top 50 Best Nederpop Albums of All Time	9
2005	Q & Mojo	Top 40 Cosmic Rock Albums	32

== Release history ==
Country	Date
Netherlands	August 1973
United Kingdom	December 1973
United States	April 1974
