= John Lagrand (musician) =

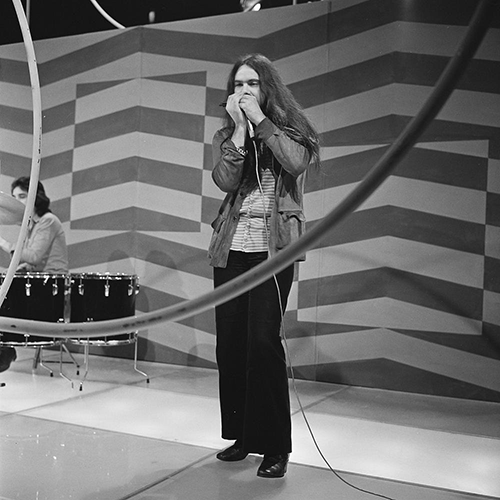
- Lagrand in 1972

Background information
- Born: 27 March 1949; The Hague, Netherlands
- Died: 30 June 2005 (aged 56) Amsterdam, Netherlands
- Genres: Blues
- Instrument: Harmonica
- Years active: 1970–2005

John Lagrand (27 March 1949 – 30 June 2005) was a Dutch musician. He was best known for playing the harmonica and was member of the blues band Livin' Blues and Cuby + Blizzards.

Lagrand began his music career with the band Livin' Blues. He supported bands such as Freelance Band and Water. In 1999, he played the group Cuby + Blizzards. He was asked to be active as a musician. Lagrand was also a member of the band Blues aan de Zee. He died on 30 June 2005, aged 56 after suffering from emphysema at the VU University Medical Center in Amsterdam.

He also once played with the rock band Golden Earring in 1979 as a session musician.
