= When the Lady Smiles =

Single by Golden Earring

from the album N.E.W.S.
- B-side: "Orwell's Year"
- Released: 3 February 1984 (NL)
- Genre: Rock
- Length: 4:59 (single version); 5:39 (album version); 6:16 (12" version)
- Label: 21 Records
- Songwriters: George Kooymans; Barry Hay
- Producer: Shell Schellekens

Golden Earring singles chronology
| "The Devil Made Me Do It" (1982) | "When the Lady Smiles" (1984) | "Clear Night, Moonlight" (1984) |

"When the Lady Smiles" is a 1984 song by Dutch band Golden Earring. It was the first single from their album N.E.W.S. (NorthEastWestSouth).

Following their United States top 10 hit "Twilight Zone", "When the Lady Smiles" was a chart disappointment in America, only reaching No. 76 on the Billboard Hot 100. However, the song became the band's fifth Hot 100 charter, making Golden Earring the most successful Dutch band on the United States singles chart.

In the Netherlands, "When the Lady Smiles" became Golden Earring's fifth number-one song. The song debuted at No. 9 on the United States Top Rock Tracks chart, but its controversial music video prevented the song from achieving further success in America.

== Controversy ==
The commercial success of "When the Lady Smiles" in the United States was thwarted by the song's controversial music video. Directed by Dick Maas, one scene portrays Golden Earring lead singer Barry Hay attempting to rape a nun on a metro car. Because of the rape scene, the video was banned from MTV.

Dutch actor Huub Stapel has a cameo in the music video as an elevator mechanic, referencing the movie The Lift. Also appearing in several scenes (metro car, window cleaner) is Hans Vandenburg, lead singer of Gruppo Sportivo.

In the United States, the song debuted at No. 9 on the Top Rock Tracks chart (now Mainstream Rock Airplay), slipped to No. 11 in its second week and then fell off the chart completely because of the music video ban.

== 2008 Hillary Clinton presidential campaign ==
New York senator Hillary Clinton used "When the Lady Smiles" during her campaign for the US presidency of 2008. The decision led to criticism from both American and Dutch figures because of the song's lyrics and graphic controversial video. While the chorus contains the lyrics "When the lady smiles, I can't resist her call, as a matter of fact, I don't resist at all," other lines include "It drives me wild, her lips are warm and resourceful" and "My friends tell me, she's the beast inside your paradise."

Golden Earring's manager stated that "There’s been no contact between Clinton’s team and us" for usage of the song. Her husband Bill Clinton had previously used the band's 1973 hit single "Radar Love" in his 1992 presidential campaign.

However, "When the Lady Smiles" was pulled from Hillary Clinton's campaign after her team discovered the assault scene in the song's music video.

== Charts ==
=== Weekly charts ===
| Chart (1984) | Peak position |
|---|---|
| Belgium (Ultratop 50 Flanders) | 1 |
| Netherlands (Dutch Top 40) | 1 |
| Netherlands (Single Top 100) | 1 |
| US Billboard Hot 100 | 76 |
| US Mainstream Rock (Billboard) | 9 |

=== Year-end charts ===
| Chart (1984) | Position |
|---|---|
| Belgium (Ultratop Flanders) | 31 |
| Netherlands (Dutch Top 40) | 21 |
| Netherlands (Single Top 100) | 12 |
