= Radar Love =

Single by Golden Earring

from the album Moontan
- B-side: "The Song Is Over" (Europe); "Just Like Vince Taylor"; (UK and US)
- Released: August 1973 (NL): 26 October 1973 (UK); 15 April 1974 (US)
- Recorded: 1973
- Studio: Trident, London
- Genre: Hard rock; progressive rock
- Length: 6:26 (album version); 5:04 (single version); 3:51 (UK single version)
- Label: Polydor (UK); Track/MCA (US)
- Songwriters: George Kooymans; Barry Hay
- Producer: Golden Earring

Television performance
- "Radar Love": The Midnight Special July 5, 1974 on YouTube

"Radar Love" is a song by the Dutch rock band Golden Earring, from their ninth studio album Moontan, written by George Kooymans and Barry Hay.

The single version of "Radar Love" became their first international hit, reaching No. 9 on the Record World chart, No. 10 on Cash Box, and No. 13 on the Billboard Hot 100 in the United States. It hit the top 10 in many countries, including the UK singles chart, Canada, Australia, Germany, and Spain.

== Lyrics ==
The song is written from the point of view of a man driving through the night to reach his lover, who he feels is calling to him through a kind of psychic or telepathic connection known as "radar love." The connection gives him a strong sense that she needs him to come home, encouraging him to drive faster despite the dangers of the road. As the journey continues, the song combines images of night time driving with radio broadcasts and the feeling that the two lovers are connected despite being physically separated. Barry Hay, the song's lyricist, later confirmed that the driver does in fact die in an accident. He explained that the idea was influenced by his interest in extrasensory perception (ESP), with the lovers remaining connected even after his death. This gives the song a darker meaning beneath its energetic, driving rhythm, as the "radar love" continues into the afterlife. The song also references Brenda Lee's 1966 song "Coming On Strong," which is heard as a "forgotten song" on the car radio. The reference adds to the song's night time road-trip atmosphere and connects the story to an older pop song.

== Composition ==
Like other famous songs of the era ("Highway Star", "Stairway to Heaven", "Bohemian Rhapsody"), "Radar Love" is composed as a suite with several distinctive and quite different sections, although the tonality throughout remains similar.

The intro starts with a guitar riff in four separated phrases, consisting respectively of three, three, five and three notes. The first phrase is up from C♯ minor with three power chords slightly reminiscent of Deep Purple's "Smoke on the Water". The second phrase heads down, the third is up again, higher than the previous, and the fourth leads all down to E major. According to Golden Earring bass player Rinus Gerritsen, the intro was inspired by Carlos Santana.

During the chorus, starting in C♯ minor at 1:20, the band is joined by a brass section.

Bertus Borgers plays saxophone and Eelco Gelling plays slide guitar.

== Impact ==
According to Rustyn Rose at Metalholic, the song "is a rock masterpiece, from its hooky chugging bassline, to its simple but unmistakable riffs, to its catchy anthemesque chorus. Even the jam which rides the song out is note for note classic."

The song has been chosen by many magazines and websites as a Top 10 driving song, often ranking in the top three. It was chosen as the best radio song by readers of The Washington Post in November 2001. It was the No. 1 driving song in Australia (Australian Musician, November 2005), beating two AC/DC songs; and in Canada (BBC Canada, March 2006). In 2011 it received a vast number of votes as the "Ultimate Driving Song" in a poll on PlanetRock and "finished well ahead of its nearest rival, Deep Purple's 'Highway Star'."

The bassline, guitar improvisation, and drum solo riff were used, in the late 1970s and early 1980s as part of the opening credits and theme to the long-running Australian current affairs programme Four Corners produced by ABC, before it segues into the official theme, Robert Maxwell's "Lost Patrol".

== Cover versions and Radar-Love.net ==
According to the radar-love.net TimeTravel, the song has been covered more than 800 times by, among others, Tribe 8, Ministry, Omen, U2, R.E.M., Ian Stuart Donaldson, Sun City Girls, Dutch group Centerfold, Blue Man Group, Def Leppard, James Last, NWOBHM band Aragorn, Nine Pound Hammer, Oh Well, Joe Santana, the Space Lady, and the Pressure Boys. White Lion's version charted at No. 59 on the Hot 100.

Goth-pop band Ghost Dance recorded a cover of the song on the B-side of their 1986 "Heart Full of Soul" single, itself a cover of the Yardbirds track which were then included on their 1988 compilation album Gathering Dust.

A pre-Mercyful Fate band featuring King Diamond on vocals recorded a cover of the song. It is featured on the 2001 compilation album King Diamond & Black Rose 20 Years Ago.

WaveGroup Sound covered the White Lion version of the song in the 2007 video game Guitar Hero Encore: Rocks the 80s.

On August 25, 2023, a biography of the song, Radar Love 50 jaar - Biography of the Ultimate Drivin' Song, was released in the Netherlands.

== In popular culture ==
On July 5, 1974 the band performed the song on The Midnight Special.

The song has been featured in several films including The Private Eyes (1976), Wayne's World 2 (1993), Detroit Rock City (1999), Baby Driver (2017), and The Tender Bar (2021).

It was a central piece in the 2007 Reaper series episode 7 "Love, Bullets & Blacktop", being featured on an 8-track cartridge.

It is part of the setlist in the rhythm game Rock Band 3 (2010).

== Chart history ==
=== Weekly charts ===
Chart (1973–1974)	Peak position
Australian Singles (Kent Music Report)	10
Austria (Ö3 Austria Top 40)	10
Belgium (Ultratop 50 Flanders)	6
Belgium (Ultratop 50 Wallonia)	9
Canada Top Singles (RPM)	10
Germany (GfK)	5
Ireland (IRMA)	16
Netherlands (Single Top 100)	1
UK Singles (Official Charts)	7
US Billboard Hot 100	13

Radar Love {1977}

Chart (1977)	Peak position
UK Singles (Official Charts)	44

White Lion

Chart (1989)	Peak position
US Billboard Hot 100	59

Oh Well

Chart (1990)	Peak position
UK Singles (Official Charts)	65

=== Year-end charts ===
Chart (1974)	Rank
Australia (Kent Music Report)	56
Canada	94
US Billboard Hot 100	64
US Cash Box	97

== Certifications ==
Region	Certification	Certified units/sales
United Kingdom (BPI)	Silver	250,000^{^}
^{^} Shipments figures based on certification alone.
