= Golden Earring =

Dutch rock band

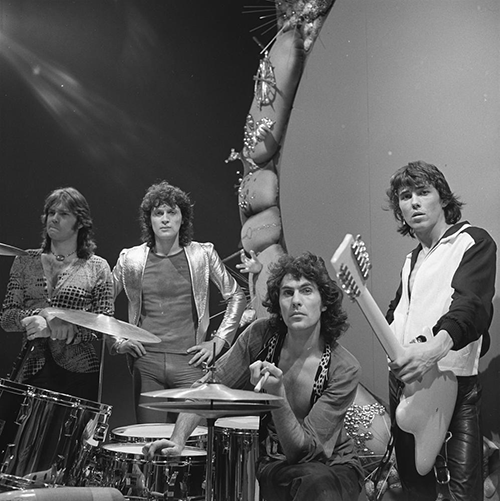
- Golden Earring in 1974 left to right: Rinus Gerritsen, Barry Hay, Cesar Zuiderwijk, George Kooymans

Background information
- Also known as: The Tornados (1961–1962); The Golden Earrings (1962–1966); Golden Earrings (1966–1968); The Golden Earring (1969)
- Origin: The Hague, Netherlands
- Genres: Hard rock; blues rock; jazz rock; psychedelic rock; garage rock
- Works: Discography
- Years active: 1961–2021; 2026
- Labels: Polydor; MCA; Track; Universal; Columbia; Capitol; 21; Polygram; Atlantic; Atco; First Quake; Red Bullet
- Past members: George Kooymans; Rinus Gerritsen; Fred van der Hilst; Hans van Herwerden; Peter de Rond; Frans Krassenburg; Jaap Eggermont; Barry Hay; Sieb Warner; Cesar Zuiderwijk; Robert Jan Stips; Eelco Gelling
- Website: goldenearring.nl

Golden Earring was a Dutch rock band, founded in 1961 in The Hague as the Tornados. They achieved worldwide fame with their songs "Radar Love" in 1973, which went to number one on the Dutch chart, reached the top ten in the United Kingdom, and went to number thirteen on the United States chart, "Back Home" in 1970, "Twilight Zone" in 1982, and "When the Lady Smiles" in 1984. During their career they had nearly 30 top-ten singles on the Dutch charts and released 25 studio albums.

The band went through a number of early personnel changes until settling on a stable lineup in 1970, consisting of Rinus Gerritsen (bass and keyboards), George Kooymans (vocals and guitar), Barry Hay (vocals, guitar, flute and saxophone), and Cesar Zuiderwijk (drums and percussion), which remained unchanged until the band broke up in 2021 when the band announced that Kooymans had been diagnosed with ALS. A number of other musicians also appeared in short stints with the band over its history.

Kooymans died 22 July 2025. Although the band initially declined a concert afterwards, the band organized a series of farewell concerts under the title One Last Night in Rotterdam Ahoy from 26 to 30 January 2026, together with other Dutch artists.

== History ==
=== Early years (1961–1969) ===
What became Golden Earring was formed in 1961 in The Hague by 13-year-old George Kooymans and his 15-year-old neighbor, Rinus Gerritsen. Originally called "the Tornados", the name was changed to the Golden Earrings when they discovered that the name the Tornados was already in use by another group. The name "the Golden Earrings" was taken from an instrumental called "Golden Earrings" performed by the British group the Hunters, for whom they served as opening and closing act. Initially a pop-rock band with Frans Krassenburg on lead vocals and Jaap Eggermont on drums, the Golden Earrings had a hit with their debut single "Please Go", recorded in 1965. Dissatisfied with Dutch recording studios, the band's manager and co-discoverer Fred Haayen arranged for the next single to be recorded at the Pye Records studios in London. The record cut at Pye, "That Day", reached number two on the Dutch charts. The definite article was dropped from the name in 1967, and the plural "s" was dropped in 1969.

In 1967, Barry Hay joined the band, replacing Krassenburg as frontman. Two years later, the band earned their first number one hit in the Netherlands with the song "Dong Dong Diki Digi Dong". In the United States, ground work for entering the US market was being laid by East Coast FM radio disc jockey and music critic Neil Kempfer-Stocker, who is credited as the first radio DJ to play the band in the US. This single was followed by a successful psychedelic album Eight Miles High, which featured a 19-minute version of the title track, a cover of the 1966 hit song by the Byrds. The song, played throughout their US tour, became the core performance of their live shows, and their experience in the US led them to make their studio albums resemble their live shows, rather than the other way around. The band's American records during this period were issued by the Perception Records label in New York, and the band's Golden Earring LP, known as Wall of Dolls, and single "Back Home" performed poorly in the US but became a number 1 hit in the Netherlands.

=== International fame (1970s and 1980s) ===
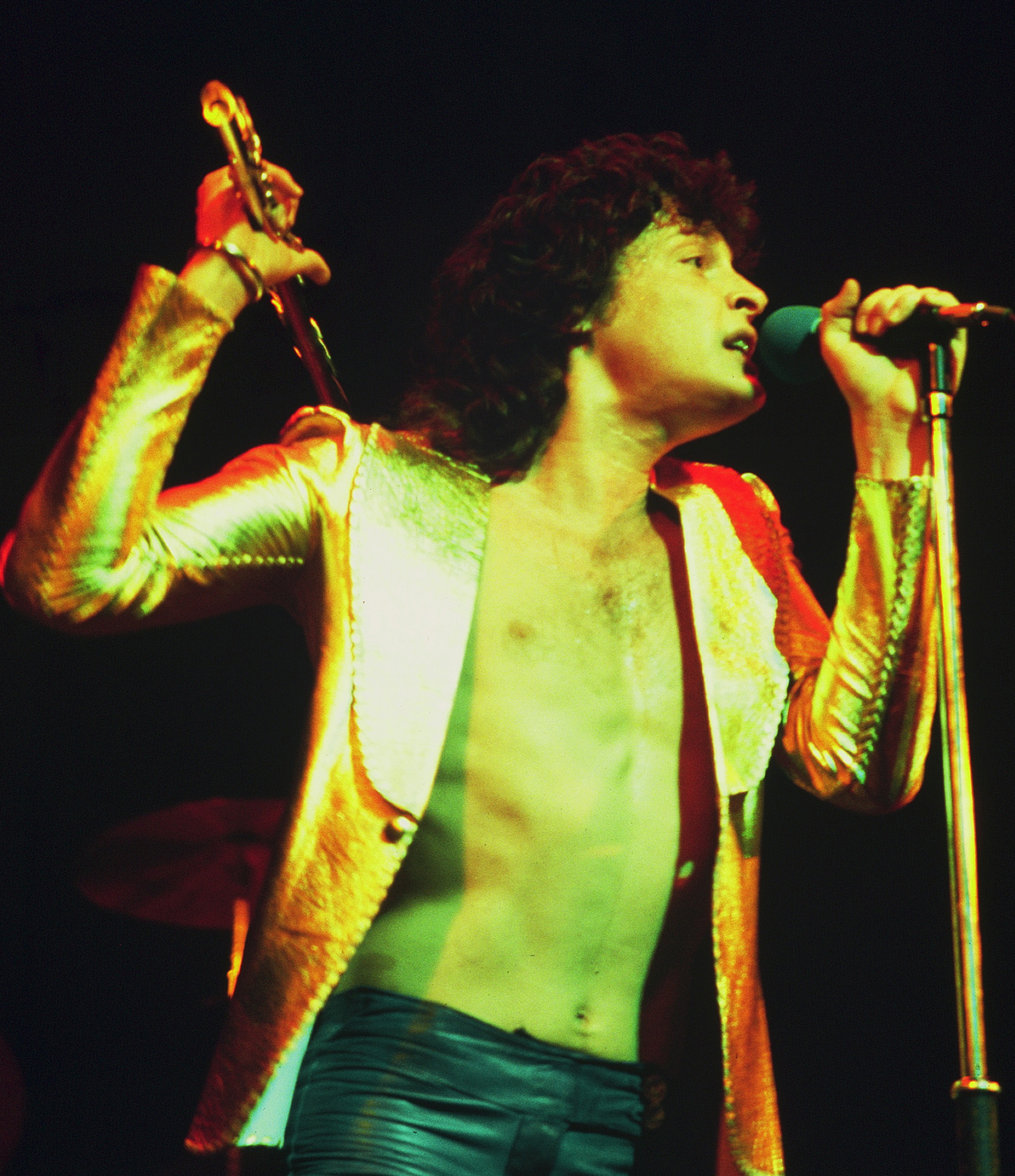
Lead singer Barry Hay in 1974

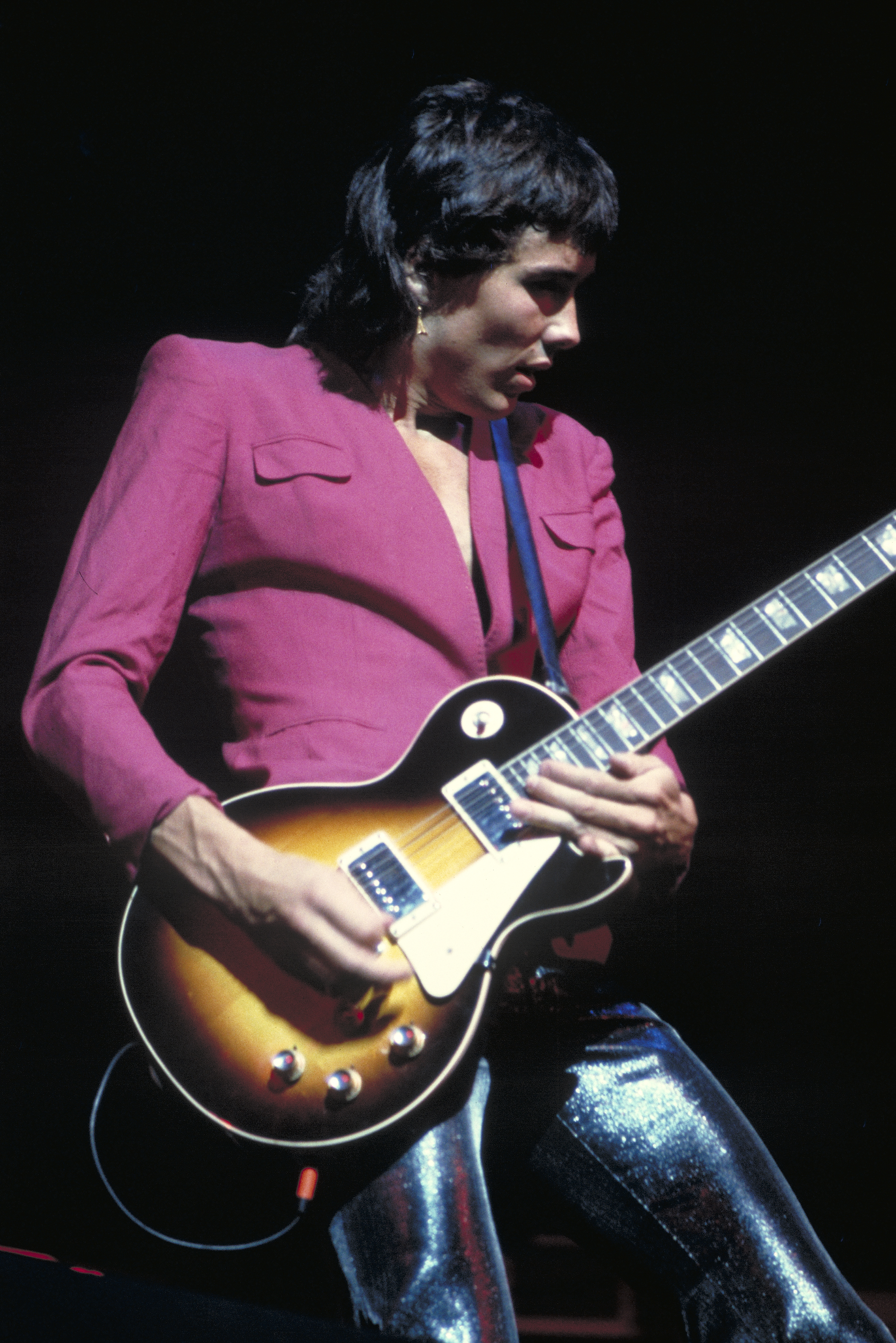
Lead guitarist George Kooymans in 1974

In 1969, drummer Cesar Zuiderwijk joined the band, completing what has become Golden Earring's classic line-up. The band enjoyed brief international fame in the 1970s when the single version of "Radar Love" (1973), from the gold-certified album Moontan, became a hit in both Europe and the US. Golden Earring embarked on their first major US tour in 1969–1970. Owing to American influences, their music evolved towards hard rock, and they performed along with Jimi Hendrix, Led Zeppelin, Procol Harum, and Eric Clapton. Between 1969 and 1984, Golden Earring completed 13 US tours. During this period, they performed as the opening act for Santana, King Crimson, the Doobie Brothers, Rush and .38 Special. During 1973–1974, when "Radar Love" was a hit, they had Kiss and Aerosmith as their opening acts.

Golden Earring released the Live album in 1977. The album was recorded at London's Rainbow Theater.

Golden Earring enjoyed a brief period of US stardom, but were unable to secure further chart success until 1982's "Twilight Zone". The music video of the song, directed by Dick Maas, was played on the recently launched MTV, and helped the song to become a US hit, spending 27 weeks on the Billboard chart.

"When the Lady Smiles" became an international hit in 1984, reaching No. 3 in Canada and becoming the band's fifth number one hit in their native country, but was not successful in the United States, reaching no higher than No. 76 on the US Singles Chart. The video was banned from MTV because of its "unholy desires about a nun and a lobotomy"; this was Dick Maas's second video for the band, and helped launch his career as a film director. While touring the US in 1984, the band played at the Great Arena Six Flags Great Adventure in New Jersey on May 11 and were in the midst of their performance when a fire broke out at the Haunted Castle on the opposite side of the theme park, killing eight teenagers. Following this tour, Golden Earring turned their focus toward Europe where they continued to attract standing-room-only crowds. The group paused briefly after the release of The Hole in 1986 to focus on other projects, with Hay and Kooymans both releasing solo albums (Victory of Bad Taste and Solo, respectively) the following year. The group then reconvened to record their final album of the 1980s, releasing Keeper of the Flame in 1989.

=== Later years (1990s–2021) ===
In 1991, Golden Earring had another hit in the Netherlands with "Going to the Run", a rock-ballad about a Hells Angels motorcycle gang member who was a friend of the band and died in a crash. The Russian heavy metal band Aria made a successful cover of "Going to the Run" as "Беспечный ангел" ("Careless Angel"). Between 1992 and 2004, the band released three acoustic live unplugged albums, which became quick successes. The first, The Naked Truth, sold 450,000 copies within the first few years and became the third-best selling album of 1993 in the Netherlands.

Golden Earring celebrated their 50th anniversary in 2011, which the Dutch postal service honored with a stamp that contained a music link: when a smartphone with a special app is held up to the music stamp, Golden Earring's "Radar Love" plays.

On 11 May 2012, the band released what was to prove to be their final studio album, Tits 'n Ass.

On 5 February 2021, the band's manager announced to the Dutch press that the band's active career was over due to George Kooymans' serious ALS illness.

=== Reunion and death of George Kooymans (2025–2026) ===
In January 2025, the band announced that they would play one final concert, titled "Golden Earring: One Last Night", at the Rotterdam Ahoy on 30 January 2026. Due to his ALS diagnosis, Kooymans was not scheduled to play, but several famous Dutch artists were to perform with the band, and five euros from each ticket sold went to ALS research. Because of extra demand, four more shows from 26 to 29 January were added, which also all sold out immediately.

Kooymans died on 22 July 2025 at the age of 77.

The five farewell shows took place from 26 to 30 January 2026. Golden Earring performed their songs with Dutch artists such as Son Mieux, Acda en De Munnik, Maan, Davina Michelle, Danny Vera and Di-rect. The shows concluded with a pre-recorded video of Kooymans playing the song "Hold Me Now".

== Band members ==
=== Classic lineup ===
- George Kooymans – guitar, vocals (1961–2021; died 2025)
- Rinus Gerritsen – bass, keyboards, guitar, harmonica (1961–2021, 2026)
- Barry Hay – vocals, guitar, flute, saxophone (1967–2021, 2026)
- Cesar Zuiderwijk – drums, percussion (1970–2021, 2026)

=== Former members ===
- Fred van der Hilst – drums, percussion (1962–1965; died 2026)
- Hans van Herwerden – guitar (1962–1963)
- Peter de Ronde – guitar (1963–1966)
- Frans Krassenburg – vocals (1964–1967)
- Jaap Eggermont – drums, percussion (1965–1969)
- Sieb Warner – drums, percussion (1969–1970)
- Robert Jan Stips – keyboards, synthesizers (1974–1976; 1977–1978, 1980, 1982, 1986 as a session musician)
- Eelco Gelling – guitar (1976–1978; 1973-1975 as a session musician)

=== Session musicians ===
- Bertus Borgers – saxophone (1971, 1973–1976)
- John Lagrand – harmonica (1979)

=== Lineups ===
1961–1962	1962–1963	1963–1964	1964–1965
George Kooymans – guitar, vocals; Rinus Gerritsen – bass, keyboards, guitar, harmonica	George Kooymans – guitar, vocals; Rinus Gerritsen – bass, keyboards, guitar, harmonica; Hans van Herwerden – guitar; Fred van der Hilst – drums, percussion	George Kooymans – guitar, vocals; Rinus Gerritsen – bass, keyboards, guitar, harmonica; Fred van der Hilst – drums, percussion; Peter de Ronde – guitar	George Kooymans – guitar, vocals; Rinus Gerritsen – bass, keyboards, guitar, harmonica; Fred van der Hilst – drums, percussion; Peter de Ronde – guitar; Frans Krassenburg – vocals
1965–1966	1966–1967	1967–1969	1969–1970
George Kooymans – guitar, vocals; Rinus Gerritsen – bass, keyboards, guitar, harmonica; Peter de Ronde – guitar; Frans Krassenburg – vocals; Jaap Eggermont – drums, percussion	George Kooymans – guitar, vocals; Rinus Gerritsen – bass, keyboards, guitar, harmonica; Frans Krassenburg – vocals; Jaap Eggermont – drums, percussion	George Kooymans – guitar, vocals; Rinus Gerritsen – bass, keyboards, guitar, harmonica; Jaap Eggermont – drums, percussion; Barry Hay – vocals, guitar, flute, saxophone	George Kooymans – guitar, vocals; Rinus Gerritsen – bass, keyboards, guitar, harmonica; Barry Hay – vocals, guitar, flute, saxophone; Sieb Warner – drums, percussion
1970–1974	1974–1975	1975–1978	1978–2021
George Kooymans – guitar, vocals; Rinus Gerritsen – bass, keyboards, guitar, harmonica; Barry Hay – vocals, guitar, flute, saxophone; Cesar Zuiderwijk – drums, percussion	George Kooymans – guitar, vocals; Rinus Gerritsen – bass, keyboards, guitar, harmonica; Barry Hay – vocals, guitar, flute, saxophone; Cesar Zuiderwijk – drums, percussion; Robert Jan Stips – keyboards, synthesizers	George Kooymans – guitar, vocals; Rinus Gerritsen – bass, keyboards, guitar, harmonica; Barry Hay – vocals, guitar, flute, saxophone; Cesar Zuiderwijk – drums, percussion; Eelco Gelling – guitar	George Kooymans – guitar, vocals; Rinus Gerritsen – bass, keyboards, guitar, harmonica; Barry Hay – vocals, guitar, flute, saxophone; Cesar Zuiderwijk – drums, percussion
2026
Rinus Gerritsen – bass, keyboards, guitar, harmonica; Barry Hay – vocals, guitar, flute, saxophone; Cesar Zuiderwijk – drums, percussion

== Discography ==
- Just Ear-rings (1965)
- Winter-Harvest (1967)
- Miracle Mirror (1968)
- On the Double (1969)
- Eight Miles High (1969)
- Golden Earring (1970)
- Seven Tears (1971)
- Together (1972)
- Moontan (1973)
- Switch (1975)
- To the Hilt (1976)
- Contraband (1976)
- Live (1977)
- Grab It for a Second (1978)
- No Promises...No Debts (1979)
- Prisoner of the Night (1980)
- Cut (1982)
- N.E.W.S. (1984)
- The Hole (1986)
- Keeper of the Flame (1989)
- Bloody Buccaneers (1991)
- Face It (1994)
- Love Sweat (1995)
- Paradise in Distress (1999)
- Millbrook U.S.A. (2003)
- Tits 'n Ass (2012)
- The Hague (EP) (2015)

== Sources ==
- Biography by Golden Earring founder and bass player Rinus Gerritsen published on the band's website.
- Biographical books on the Golden Earring: Haagsche Bluf by Pieter Franssen, 1993, and Rock die niet roest by prof. Maarten Steenmeyer, 2005. Both titles are in Dutch.
- The Story of Golden Earring by Karin and Mechteld Beks, Picture publishers, an authorized biography published on the occasion of the band's 45th anniversary. Text in Dutch. (2005)
- Interviews with the band over the years, many of which can be traced back through the Golden Earring Museum website.
