= Cesar Zuiderwijk =

Dutch drummer

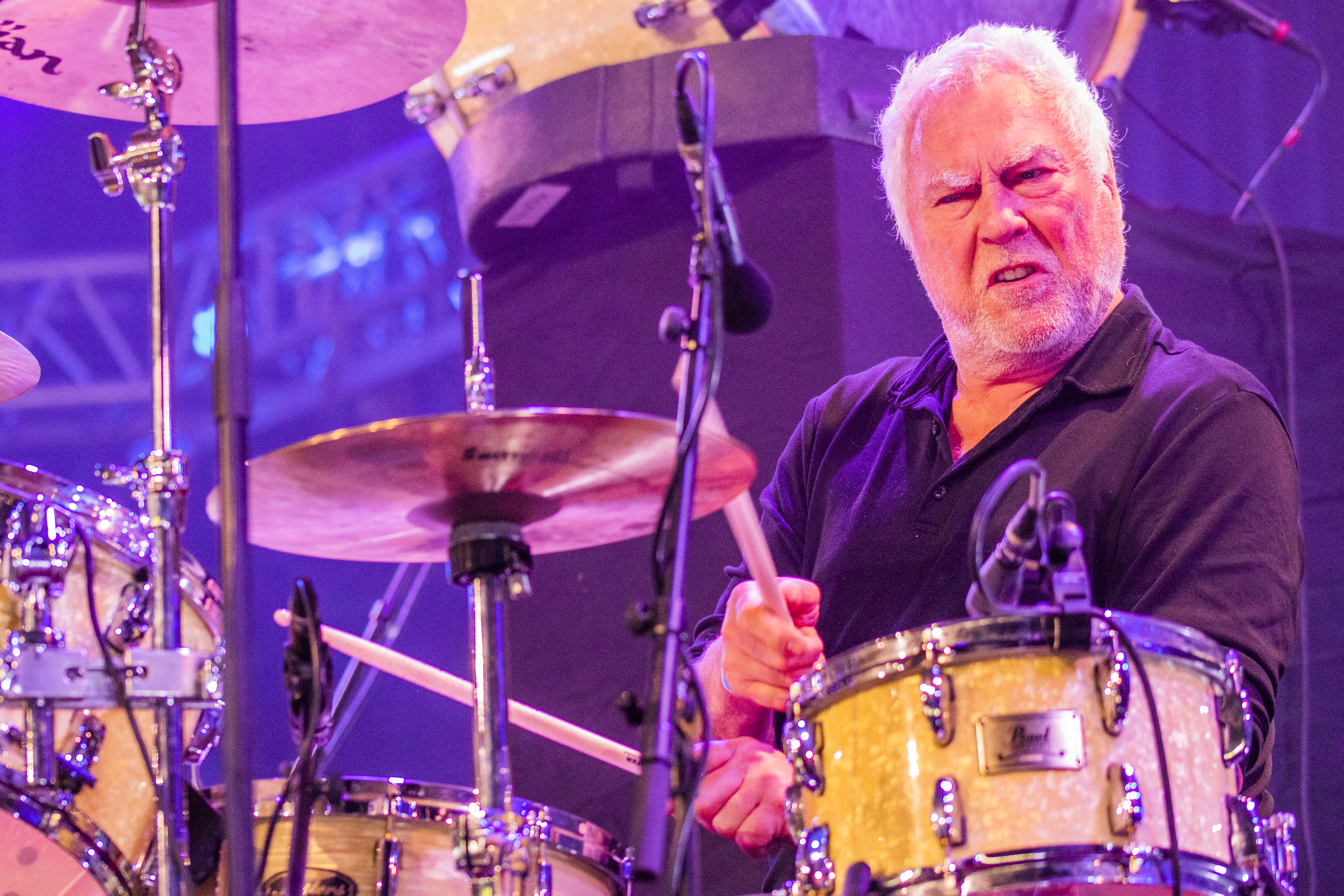
- Zuiderwijk in 2022

Background information
- Born: Cornelis Johannes Zuiderwijk; 18 July 1948 (age 77); The Hague, Netherlands
- Genres: Rock
- Occupations: Drummer
- Instruments: Drums
- Years active: 1970–present
- Label: Polydor
- Formerly of: Golden Earring

Cornelis Johannes "Cesar" Zuiderwijk, (born 18 July 1948) is a Dutch drummer. He is best known as the drummer of the Dutch rock band Golden Earring from 1970 until their retirement in 2021.

== Career ==
He was asked to replace Golden Earring drummer Sieb Warner in 1970. Since then, apart from brief line-ups of five (with Robert Jan Stips and later Eelco Gelling), Golden Earring has consisted of the same four friends (Zuiderwijk, George Kooymans, Barry Hay and Rinus Gerritsen). Zuiderwijk is known to add a drum solo to each performance, which he concludes by launching himself over his drum kit.

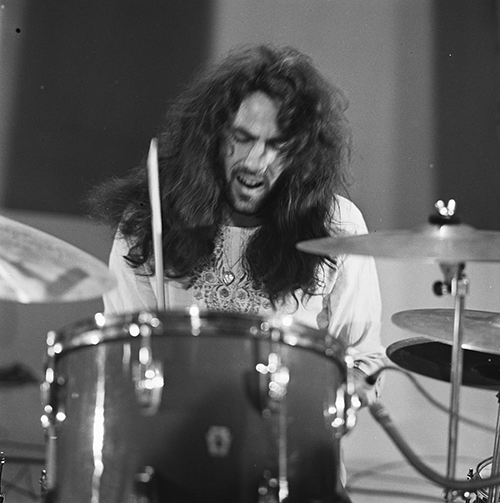
Zuiderwijk in 1971

They achieved worldwide fame with their international hit songs "Radar Love" in 1973, which went to number one on the Dutch chart, reached the top ten in the United Kingdom, and went to number thirteen on the United States chart, "Twilight Zone" in 1982, and "When the Lady Smiles" in 1984. During their career they had nearly 30 top-ten singles on the Dutch charts and released 25 studio albums.

In 1985, Zuiderwijk opened the Rock Palace music store with Gerritsen.

Since 1992, Cesar has taught people how to play drums. In September 1992, Zuiderwijk and his Golden Earring bandmates joined at least a thousand other drummers to play "Radar Love" on the Maasvlakte in Rotterdam. In 1999 he was invited by War Child to teach children in the Bosnian town Mostar, to play drums. In 2000 he went on tour with Percossa Percussion as members of Golden Earring took a year off. The theatre show "Alle gekheid met een stokje" consisted of sketches, drum escapades and stories.

On 1 May 2006, Cesar opened a music station, called "The Rotterdam Branch of Music Station", where people can be taught music lessons.

In 2014, Zuiderwijk was asked by Veronica DJ Silvan Stoet to attend the Spring Rhythm Event organized by the DJ and the Dutch Longfonds organization.

On 5 February 2021, the band's manager announced to the Dutch press that their active career was over due to George Kooymans' serious illness.

Since 2022, Zuiderwijk has been a judge on the Dutch show The Tribute, Battle of the Bands. He also plays in the band "Sloper", that includes Mario Goossens of the Belgian rock band Triggerfinger.

== Personal life ==
When Zuiderwijk was twelve he started playing the guitar, but switched to drums two years later. As a teenager, his father died, and Zuiderwijk would later explain that this event prompted him to start playing drums - it was the best way to release his pent-up aggression. He played drums in a number of bands: his school band René & His Alligators, plus Hu & the Hilltops and Livin' Blues.

In 1985, Zuiderwijk made the news when the police found a gun in the attic after a burglary in the Zuiderwijk home. Zuiderwijk is said to have smuggled this with him in his drum kit years earlier, after an American tour. He was sentenced to one month in prison.

Cesar has married twice. He was married to his first wife, Marianne Vreewijk, from 1994 to 2001. They had two children: Selma and Casper. He remarried in 2010. He proposed to his current wife on a hot air balloon.
