= Rinus Gerritsen =

Dutch musician

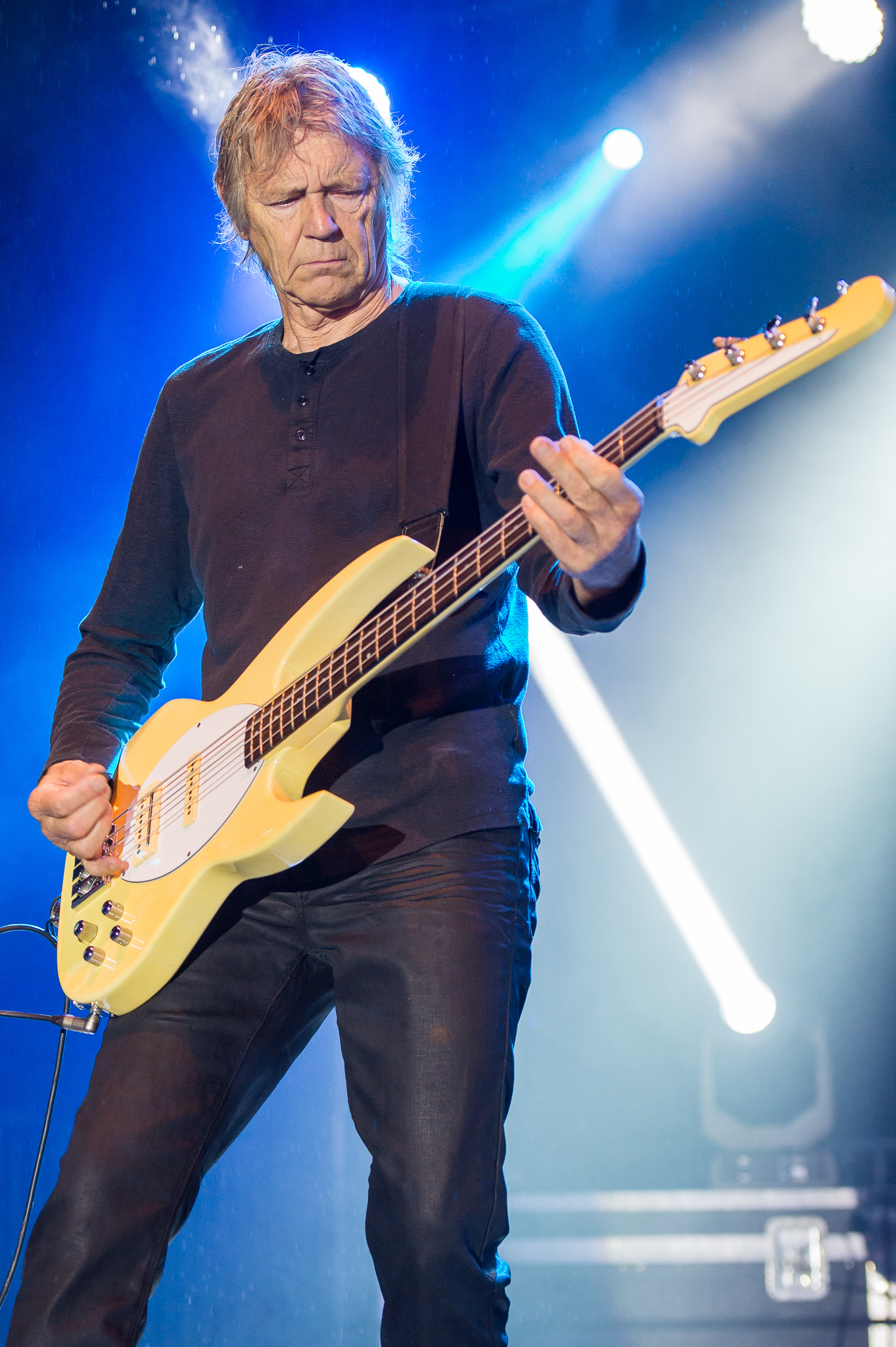
- Rinus Gerritsen (2015)

Background information
- Born: Marinus Gerritsen; 9 August 1946 (age 79); The Hague, Netherlands
- Genres: Rock
- Occupations: Bassist, songwriter
- Instruments: Bass guitar, Keyboards
- Years active: 1961–present

Marinus Gerritsen (born 9 August 1946) is a Dutch bassist. Best known for being a founding member of Dutch group Golden Earring, he is also a producer of artists like Herman Brood.

== Career ==
In 1961, Gerritsen and his neighbour George Kooymans formed a rock duo. They originally called themselves "The Tornados", but changed their name to "The Golden Earrings" when they learnt of The Tornados, a UK instrumental group who had just had a hit with "Telstar". The name "the Golden Earrings" was taken from an instrumental called "Golden Earrings" performed by the British group the Hunters, for whom they served as opening and closing act. Initially a pop-rock band with Frans Krassenburg on lead vocals and Jaap Eggermont on drums, the Golden Earrings had a hit with their debut single "Please Go", recorded in 1965. After two albums, Barry Hay joined on lead vocals permanently, and by 1970, Sieb Warner had been replaced by Cesar Zuiderwijk, and the principal lineup (that would last for fifty years) was finalised.

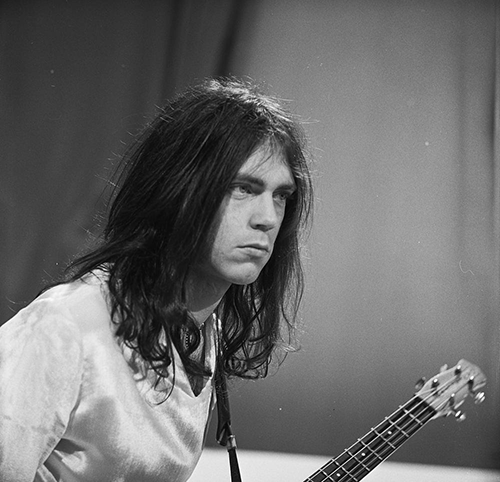
Gerritsen in 1971

They achieved worldwide fame with their international hit songs "Radar Love" in 1973, which went to number one on the Dutch chart, reached the top ten in the United Kingdom, and went to number thirteen on the United States chart, "Twilight Zone" in 1982, and "When the Lady Smiles" in 1984. During their career they had nearly 30 top-ten singles on the Dutch charts and released 25 studio albums.

In 1979, Gerritsen released his first solo album, in collaboration with Michel van Dijk. As a producer, Rinus has produced albums for Herman Brood and the band Urban Heroes. In 1985, Gerritsen opened the Rock Palace music store with Zuiderwijk. Rinus also writes articles for Dutch music magazine De Bassist.

Steve Harris of Iron Maiden counts Gerritsen as an important influence.

On 5 February 2021, the band's manager announced to the Dutch press that their active career was over due to George Kooymans' serious illness.

== Personal life ==
Marinus Gerritsen was born in The Hague in 1946. He has a brother, Rob, who is three years older and is the manager for Golden Earring, doing bookings and administration for the band. His sister Milly was married to Golden Earring member George Kooymans. Rinus is a vegetarian and teetotal since the 1980s. He lives with his wife in The Hague.

== Equipment ==
His first own bass guitar (brand name Darwin bass) was built by his father. Gerritsen was the first Dutch pop musician to own a Danelectro bass guitar. He used this guitar until it was stolen during Golden Earring's American tour in 1977, after which his father made him a new one. This white double neck is a combination of a Danelectro and a Fender. He has also used a Vox Humana RG Longscale Bass, Vox Humana Semi-Hollow Bass Guitar, Rickenbacker 4001, Fender Jazz Bass, and the Fender Jazz Bass V.
