= George Kooymans =

Dutch musician & Founder golden earring (1948–2025)

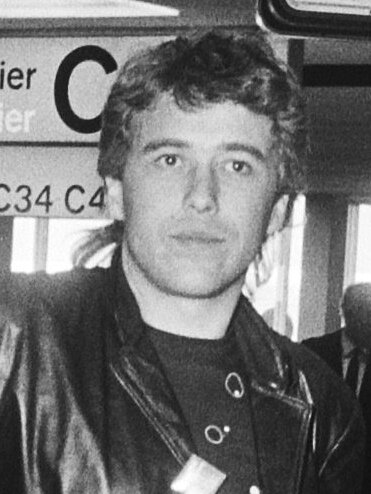
- Kooymans in 1983

Background information
- Born: George Jan Kooymans; 11 March 1948; The Hague, Netherlands
- Died: 22 July 2025 (aged 77) Rijkevorsel, Belgium
- Genres: Rock
- Occupations: Guitarist; songwriter
- Instruments: Vocals; guitar
- Years active: 1961–2022
- Formerly of: Golden Earring

George Jan Kooymans (11 March 1948 – 22 July 2025) was a Dutch guitarist and vocalist. He was best known as the founder of the Dutch rock group Golden Earring. Kooymans wrote "Twilight Zone", the group's only top 10 entry on the U.S. Billboard Hot 100, which hit No. 1 on the Billboard Top Album Tracks chart.

In 2021, Kooymans announced his retirement from the music business after he was diagnosed with ALS. He died four years later.

== Career ==
In 1961, Kooymans and his neighbour Rinus Gerritsen formed a rock duo. They originally called themselves "The Tornados", but changed their name to "The Golden Earrings" when they learnt of The Tornados, a UK instrumental group who had just had a hit with "Telstar". The name "the Golden Earrings" was taken from an instrumental called "Golden Earrings" performed by the British group the Hunters, for whom they served as opening and closing act. Initially a pop-rock band with Frans Krassenburg on lead vocals and Jaap Eggermont on drums, the Golden Earrings had a hit with their debut single "Please Go", recorded in 1965. After two albums, Barry Hay joined on lead vocals permanently, and by 1970, Sieb Warner had been replaced by Cesar Zuiderwijk, and the principal lineup (that would last for 50 years) was finalised.

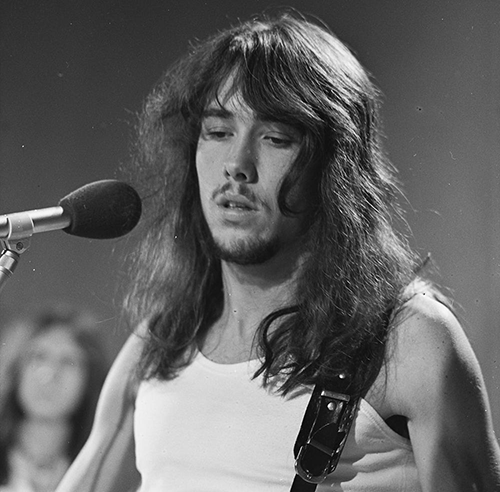
Kooymans in 1971

They achieved worldwide fame with their international hit songs "Radar Love" in 1973, which went to number one on the Dutch chart, reached the top ten in the United Kingdom, and went to number 13 on the United States chart, "Twilight Zone" in 1982, and "When the Lady Smiles" in 1984. During their career they had nearly 30 top ten singles on the Dutch charts and released 25 studio albums.

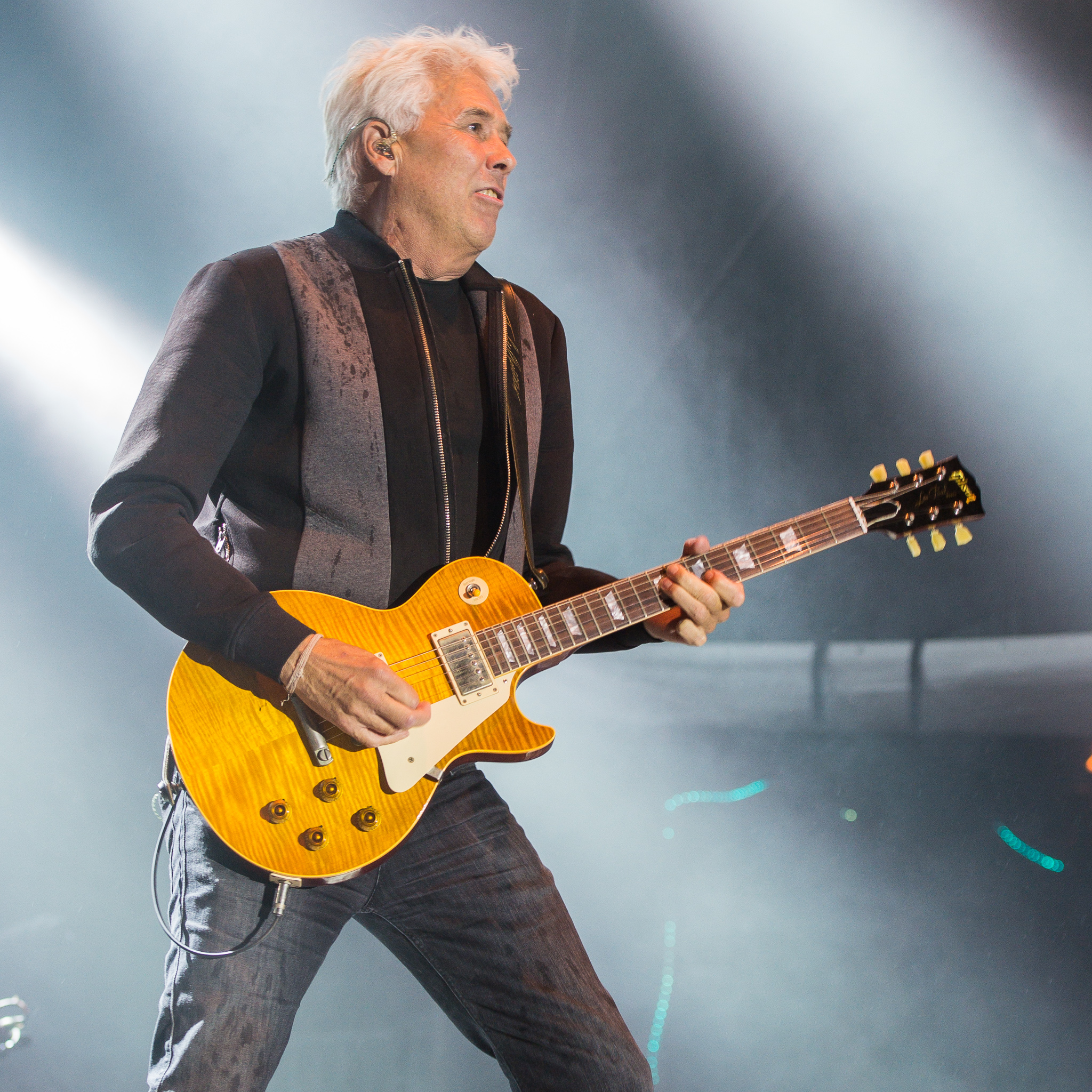
Kooymans in 2015

Kooymans wrote "Twilight Zone", the group's only top 10 pop single on the U.S. Billboard Hot 100, which hit No. 1 on the Billboard Top Album Tracks chart.

Kooymans also wrote and produced for other artists. In the sixties, he also launched the musical career of Bojoura and wrote Everybody's Day for her. Between 2017 and 2023 he released three albums as a member of Vreemde Kostgangers (Strange Boarders), a Dutch-language supergroup he formed with Henny Vrienten (bass player of the band Doe Maar) and singer-songwriter Boudewijn de Groot.

== Personal life and death ==
Kooymans was married to Melanie Gerritsen, the younger sister of Golden Earring bassist Rinus Gerritsen.

In February 2021, Kooymans announced that he was suffering from amyotrophic lateral sclerosis (ALS) and would retire. Shortly afterward, Golden Earring announced they would disband.

Kooymans died in Rijkevorsel on 22 July 2025, at the age of 77.

== Equipment ==
Kooymans primarily played a Gibson Les Paul, a Gretsch 6119, a Fender Stratocaster, a Gibson Marauder, a Gibson SG, a Yamaha SG2000, several B.C. Rich guitars, a double cutaway Gibson Melody Maker and a Gibson Firebird, with his primary amps being a Roland Jazz Chorus, a Vox AC30 amp, and a Fender Twin Reverb.

== Discography ==
=== Solo albums ===
- Jojo (1971)
- Solo (1987)
- On Location (as Kooymans-Carillo with Frank Carillo) (2010)
- Mirage (as Kooymans & Carillo with Frank Carillo) (2022)

=== Singles ===
- "Lovin' and Hurtin'" / "For Gail" 1971
- "Lost For Love" / "The Devil Rides Again Tonight" 1987
- "The Beat Goes On" / "Again" 1987
- "World of Our Own" / "All Things Are Light" 1987
