= Barry Hay =

Indian-born Dutch musician (born 1948)

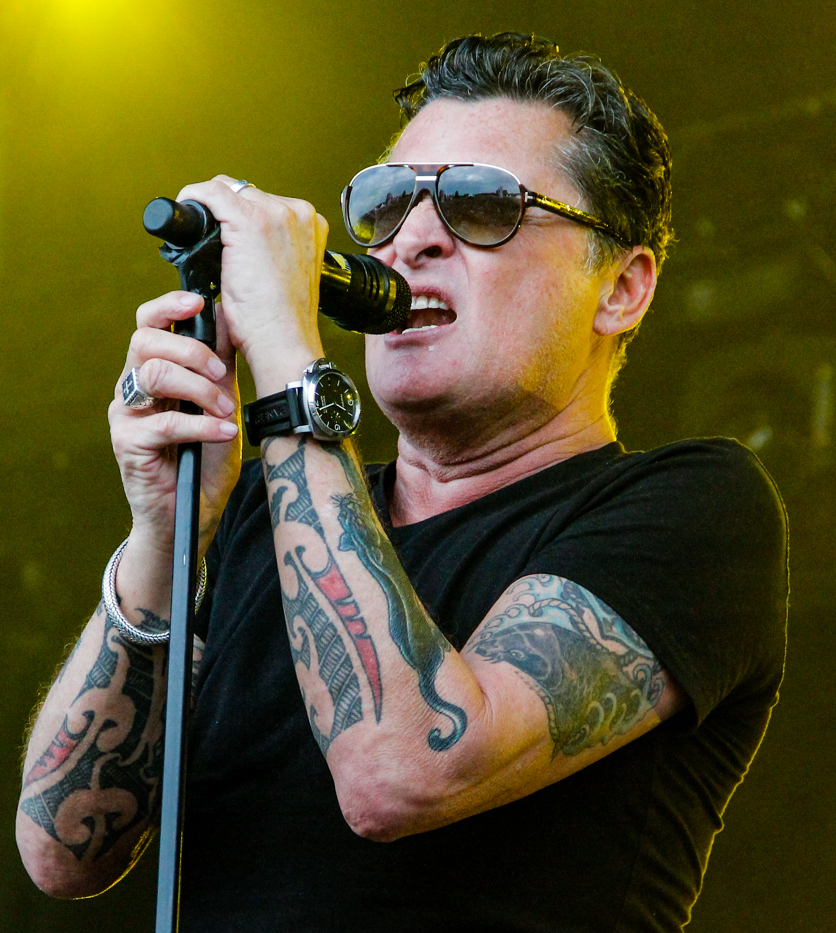
- Hay in 2014

Background information
- Born: Barry Andrew Hay; 16 August 1948 (age 78); Faizabad, United Provinces, India (present day-Ayodhya, Uttar Pradesh, India)
- Origin: The Hague, Netherlands
- Genres: Rock
- Occupations: Musician; songwriter
- Instruments: Vocals; flute; guitar
- Years active: 1967–present
- Website: barryhaymusic.com

Barry Andrew Hay (born 16 August 1948) is a Dutch musician; he was the lead vocalist and frontman of Dutch rock band Golden Earring from 1967 until their disbandment in 2021. He has also released three solo albums.

== Early life and education ==
Hay was born in Faizabad, United Provinces (present day Ayodhya, India), to a Dutch-Jewish mother, Sofia Maria née Sluijter (1922–2004, born in Makassar), and a Scottish commissioned officer, Philip Aubrey Hay (1923–1980). He moved to the Netherlands at the age of eight to live with his mother after his parents divorced. He lived in Amsterdam and later in The Hague, attending an English boarding school.

After graduating from secondary school, he took courses at the Royal Academy of Art, The Hague.

=== Background ===
Hay's grandmother, Flora Sluijter-Polak (born 29 January 1890 in Amsterdam), was killed in an Auschwitz concentration camp on 1 October 1942, and her child, Marcus Sluijter (born 21 August 1927) was also killed in Auschwitz, on 31 January 1943, aged fifteen. After the Second World War ended, Barry's mother hid her Jewish identity and "no longer wanted to know that she was Jewish".

His maternal grandfather served in the Dutch East Indies Army.

== Career ==
Hay started his music career with a band called The Haigs. In the summer of 1967, he was asked to join the Golden Earrings, as they were then called (the "Earrings" was later changed to "Earring"), replacing Frans Krassenburg. Hay created the cover art for some of Golden Earring's albums.

They achieved worldwide fame with their international hit songs "Radar Love" in 1973, which went to number one on the Dutch chart, reached the top ten in the United Kingdom, and went to number thirteen on the United States chart, "Twilight Zone" in 1982, and "When the Lady Smiles" in 1984. During their career they had nearly 30 top-ten singles on the Dutch charts and released 25 studio albums.

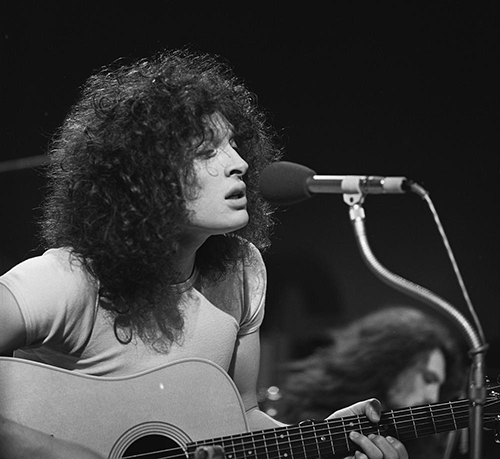
Hay in 1971

He has released three solo albums. Only Parrots, Frogs and Angels (1972) and Victory of Bad Taste (1987) both had little success. The Big Band Theory (2008) is available for online streaming. The Big Band Theory featured music from Metropole Orkest. In 2009, he released a DVD of him and the Orkest performing the album live.

In 1990, Hay lent his voice to the Dutch dub of the animated film "All Dogs Go to Heaven", providing the voice of Charlie. He later did this again for the Dutch version of Fern Gully and for Hanekam de Rocker (together with his bandmate George Kooymans ). In 1999 he played a small role - as himself - in An Amsterdam Tale .

In 1994, he sang lead vocals and played alto flute on the Ayreon song "Sail Away to Avalon", the single from the latter's debut album, The Final Experiment.

During the 2000s, Hay provided the Dutch voice of Rock Zilla in the Canadian cartoon show My Dad The Rock Star, and he appeared in an advertisement for prescription sunglasses.

In 2016, Hay released an album with side-project Flying V Formation, and his biography. In December 2017, the Flying V released a cover of The Ronettes' 1963 hit song "Be My Baby".

In 2019, Hay released an album with musician JB Meijers (The Common Linnets); For You Baby, which contains Latin-flavoured cover versions and includes Blue Bayou, a duet with Danny Vera.

On 5 February 2021, the band's manager announced to the Dutch press that their active career was over due to George Kooymans' serious illness. In 2022, he released another album in collaboration with JB Meijers, titled "Fiesta de la Vida".

== Personal life ==
Hay married Sandra Bastiaan on February 22, 1992. The couple has two daughters, born in 1990 (Bella Hay) and 1999 (Gina Hay).

In 2001, Hay left The Hague and moved back to Amsterdam, although he now divides his time between the Netherlands and Curaçao, where he hosts a radio show.

== Discography ==
Golden Earring

(See full discography at Golden Earring discography)

Solo

- Only Parrots, Frogs and Angels (1972)
- Victory of Bad Taste (1987)
- The Big Band Theory (2008)
- Barry Hay's Flying V Formation (2016)
- For You Baby (2019)
- Fiesta de la Vida (2022)
