= Moonflight (song) =

Single by Vik Venus
- B-side: "Everybody's on Strike"
- Released: July 1969 (U.S.)
- Genre: Pop, novelty
- Label: Buddah
- Songwriter: Vik Venus (Alias: Your Main Moon Man)

"Moonflight" is a song written and originally recorded by Vik Venus (Alias: Your Main Moon Man) in 1969. It is a 'break-in' song, with popular hits of the day interspersed at humorous points throughout the song in response to spoken-word prompts, in the style of Dickie Goodman, who had many such hits. "Moonflight" became a hit during the summer of '69, reaching #38 U.S. Billboard and #23 Cash Box. It also charted in Canada, where it reached #20. It did best in South Africa, however, where it reached #7.

The song was Venus' only hit record. However, a follow-up song, also Moon-landing themed, was released entitled "Moonjack". The featured 'break-in' songs, however, were sampled in the style of Alvin and the Chipmunks.

Dickie Goodman also did a Moon-landing themed song entitled "Luna Trip".

== Chart history ==
| Chart (1969) | Peak position |
|---|---|
| Canada RPM Top Singles | 20 |
| South Africa (Springbok) | 7 |
| U.S. Billboard Hot 100 | 38 |
| U.S. Cash Box Top 100 | 23 |

== Songs ==
The songs sampled (in order) are:

- "Simon Says" by 1910 Fruitgum Company
- "Goody Goody Gumdrops" by 1910 Fruitgum Company
- "Quick Joey Small (Run Joey Run)" by Kasenetz-Katz Singing Orchestral Circus
- "Jelly Jungle (of Orange Marmalade)" by Lemon Pipers
- "I'm a Fool for You" by The Impressions
- "Green Tambourine" by Lemon Pipers
- "Chewy Chewy" by Ohio Express
- "Indian Giver" by 1910 Fruitgum Company
- "Yummy, Yummy, Yummy" by Ohio Express
- "Rice Is Nice" by Lemon Pipers
- "Baby Make Me Feel So Good" by The Five Stairsteps
- "Chewy Chewy" by Ohio Express
- "Quick Joey Small (Run Joey Run)" by Kasenetz-Katz Singing Orchestral Circus
- "Goody Goody Gumdrops" by 1910 Fruitgum Company
- "Special Delivery" by 1910 Fruitgum Company
- "This Is My Country" by The Impressions
- "Blessed Is the Rain" by Brooklyn Bridge
- "Welcome Me Love" by Brooklyn Bridge
- "1, 2, 3, Red Light" by 1910 Fruitgum Company
- "The Worst That Could Happen" by Brooklyn Bridge
- "Mercy" by Ohio Express
