= Billboard Year-End Hot 100 singles of 1968 =

Ranking of recorded music

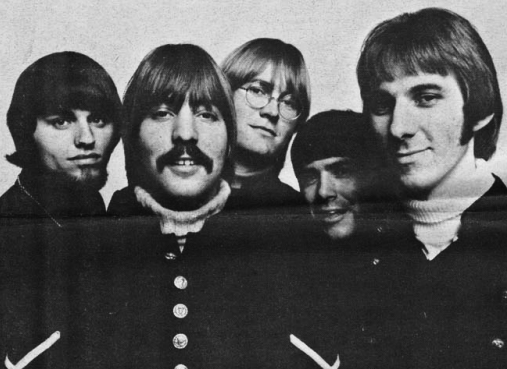
Gary Puckett & The Union Gap had four songs on the Year-End Hot 100, the most of any artist in 1968.

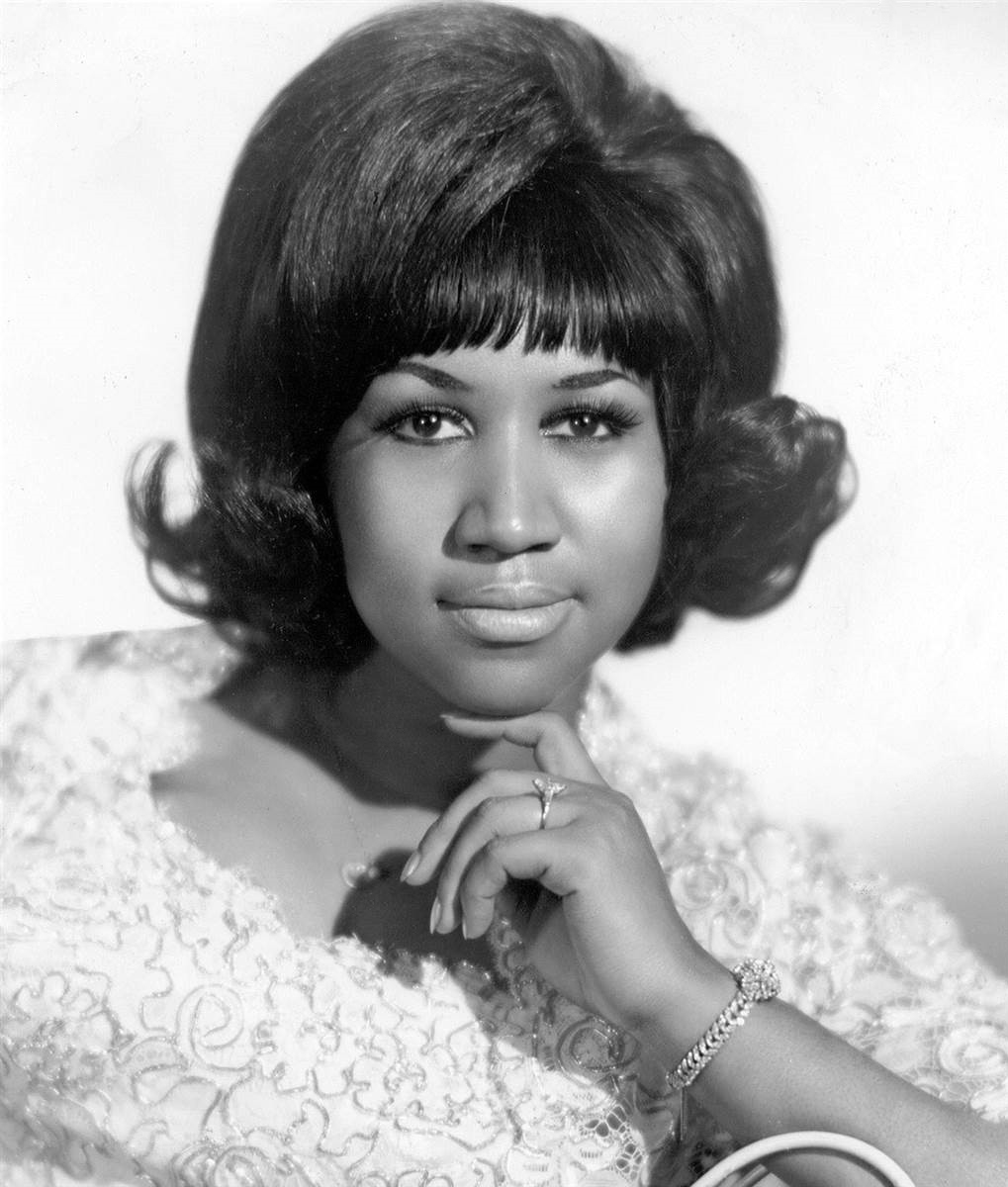
Aretha Franklin had three songs on the Year-End Hot 100.

This list is of Billboard magazine's Top Hot 100 songs of 1968. The Top 100, as revealed in the edition of Billboard dated January 11, 1969 is based on Hot 100 charts from the issue dates of January 6 through December 14, 1968.

No.	Title	Artist(s)
1	"Hey Jude"	The Beatles
2	"Love is Blue"	Paul Mauriat
3	"Honey"	Bobby Goldsboro
4	"(Sittin' On) The Dock of the Bay"	Otis Redding
5	"People Got to Be Free"	The Rascals
6	"Sunshine of Your Love"	Cream
7	"This Guy's in Love with You"	Herb Alpert
8	"The Good, the Bad and the Ugly"	Hugo Montenegro
9	"Mrs. Robinson"	Simon & Garfunkel
10	"Tighten Up"	Archie Bell & the Drells
11	"Harper Valley PTA"	Jeannie C. Riley
12	"Little Green Apples"	O. C. Smith
13	"Mony Mony"	Tommy James and the Shondells
14	"Hello, I Love You"	The Doors
15	"Young Girl"	Gary Puckett & The Union Gap
16	"Cry Like a Baby"	The Box Tops
17	"Stoned Soul Picnic"	The 5th Dimension
18	"Grazing in the Grass"	Hugh Masekela
19	"Midnight Confessions"	The Grass Roots
20	"Dance to the Music"	Sly and the Family Stone
21	"The Horse"	Cliff Nobles
22	"I Wish It Would Rain"	The Temptations
23	"La-La (Means I Love You)"	The Delfonics
24	"Turn Around, Look at Me"	The Vogues
25	"Judy in Disguise (With Glasses)"	John Fred & His Playboy Band
26	"Spooky"	Classics IV
27	"Love Child"	The Supremes
28	"Angel of the Morning"	Merrilee Rush
29	"The Ballad of Bonnie and Clyde"	Georgie Fame
30	"Those Were the Days"	Mary Hopkin
31	"Born to Be Wild"	Steppenwolf
32	"Cowboys to Girls"	The Intruders
33	"Simon Says"	1910 Fruitgum Company
34	"Lady Willpower"	Gary Puckett & The Union Gap
35	"A Beautiful Morning"	The Rascals
36	"The Look of Love"	Sérgio Mendes & Brasil '66
37	"Hold Me Tight"	Johnny Nash
38	"Yummy Yummy Yummy"	Ohio Express
39	"Fire"	The Crazy World of Arthur Brown
40	"Love Is All Around"	The Troggs
41	"Playboy"	Gene & Debbe
42	"(Theme from) Valley of the Dolls"	Dionne Warwick
43	"Classical Gas"	Mason Williams
44	"Slip Away"	Clarence Carter
45	"Girl Watcher"	The O'Kaysions
46	"(Sweet Sweet Baby) Since You've Been Gone"	Aretha Franklin
47	"Green Tambourine"	The Lemon Pipers
48	"1, 2, 3, Red Light"	1910 Fruitgum Company
49	"Reach Out of the Darkness"	Friend & Lover
50	"Jumpin' Jack Flash"	The Rolling Stones
51	"MacArthur Park"	Richard Harris
52	"Light My Fire"	José Feliciano
53	"I Love You"	People!
54	"Take Time to Know Her"	Percy Sledge
55	"Pictures of Matchstick Men"	Status Quo
56	"Summertime Blues"	Blue Cheer
57	"Ain't Nothing Like the Real Thing"	Marvin Gaye & Tammi Terrell
58	"I Got the Feelin'"	James Brown
59	"I've Gotta Get a Message to You"	The Bee Gees
60	"Lady Madonna"	The Beatles
61	"Hurdy Gurdy Man"	Donovan
62	"Magic Carpet Ride"	Steppenwolf
63	"Bottle of Wine"	The Fireballs
64	"Stay in My Corner"	The Dells
65	"Soul Serenade"	Willie Mitchell
66	"Delilah"	Tom Jones
67	"Nobody but Me"	The Human Beinz
68	"I Thank You"	Sam & Dave
69	"The Fool on the Hill"	Sérgio Mendes & Brasil '66
70	"Sky Pilot"	The Animals
71	"Indian Lake"	The Cowsills
72	"I Wonder What She's Doing Tonight"	Tommy Boyce & Bobby Hart
73	"Over You"	Gary Puckett & The Union Gap
74	"Goin' Out of My Head/Can't Take My Eyes Off You"	The Lettermen
75	"Shoo-Be-Doo-Be-Doo-Da-Day"	Stevie Wonder
76	"The Unicorn"	The Irish Rovers
77	"You Keep Me Hangin' On"	Vanilla Fudge
78	"Revolution"	The Beatles
79	"Woman, Woman"	Gary Puckett & The Union Gap
80	"Elenore"	The Turtles
81	"White Room"	Cream
82	"You're All I Need to Get By"	Marvin Gaye & Tammi Terrell
83	"Baby, Now That I've Found You"	The Foundations
84	"Sweet Inspiration"	The Sweet Inspirations
85	"If You Can Want"	Smokey Robinson and the Miracles
86	"Cab Driver"	The Mills Brothers
87	"Time Has Come Today"	The Chambers Brothers
88	"Do You Know the Way to San Jose"	Dionne Warwick
89	"Scarborough Fair"	Simon & Garfunkel
90	"Say It Loud – I'm Black and I'm Proud"	James Brown
91	"The Mighty Quinn"	Manfred Mann
92	"Here Comes the Judge"	Shorty Long
93	"I Say a Little Prayer"	Aretha Franklin
94	"Think"	Aretha Franklin
95	"Sealed with a Kiss"	Gary Lewis & the Playboys
96	"Piece of My Heart"	Big Brother and the Holding Company
97	"Suzie Q."	Creedence Clearwater Revival
98	"Bend Me, Shape Me"	The American Breed
99	"Hey, Western Union Man"	Jerry Butler
100	"Never Give You Up"	Jerry Butler

== See also ==
- 1968 in music
- List of Billboard Hot 100 number-one singles of 1968
- List of Billboard Hot 100 top-ten singles in 1968
