= List of Billboard Hot 100 top-ten singles in 1968 =

This is a list of singles that have peaked in the Top 10 of the Billboard Hot 100 during 1968.

Aretha Franklin scored five top ten hits during the year with "Chain of Fools", "(Sweet Sweet Baby) Since You've Been Gone", "Think", "The House That Jack Built", and "I Say a Little Prayer", the most among all other artists.

== Top-ten singles ==
- (#) – 1968 Year-end top 10 single position and rank

Top ten entry date	Single	Artist(s)	Peak	Peak date	Weeks in top ten
Singles from 1967
December 23	"Woman, Woman"	Gary Puckett & The Union Gap	4	January 13	8
December 30	"Judy in Disguise (With Glasses)"	John Fred and his Playboy Band	1	January 20	8
December 30	"Chain of Fools"	Aretha Franklin	2	January 20	7
December 30	"Bend Me, Shape Me"	The American Breed	5	January 27	7
Singles from 1968
January 13	"Green Tambourine"	The Lemon Pipers	1	February 3	7
January 20	"If I Could Build My Whole World Around You"	Marvin Gaye & Tammi Terrell	10	January 20	2
January 27	"Spooky"	Classics IV	3	February 10	7
February 3	"Love Is Blue" (#2)	Paul Mauriat	1	February 10	10
February 3	"I Wish It Would Rain"	The Temptations	4	February 17	7
February 3	"Goin' Out of My Head/Can't Take My Eyes Off You"	The Lettermen	7	February 10	4
February 3	"Nobody but Me"	The Human Beinz	8	February 3	4
February 17	"(Sittin' On) The Dock of the Bay" (#4)	Otis Redding	1	March 16	11
February 17	"(Theme from) Valley of the Dolls"	Dionne Warwick	2	February 24	7
February 17	"I Wonder What She's Doing Tonight"	Boyce and Hart	8	February 24	4
February 24	"Simon Says"	1910 Fruitgum Company	4	March 9	6
March 2	"Just Dropped In (To See What Condition My Condition Was In)"	The First Edition	5	March 16	4
March 2	"Bottle of Wine"	The Fireballs	9	March 2	1
March 2	"Everything That Touches You"	The Association	10	March 2	2
March 9	"La-La (Means I Love You)"	The Delfonics	4	April 6	6
March 16	"Valleri"	The Monkees	3	March 30	5
March 16	"(Sweet Sweet Baby) Since You've Been Gone"	Aretha Franklin	5	March 30	7
March 16	"I Thank You"	Sam & Dave	9	March 23	2
March 23	"The Ballad of Bonnie and Clyde"	Georgie Fame	7	April 13	6
March 30	"Young Girl"	Gary Puckett & The Union Gap	2	April 6	8
March 30	"Lady Madonna"	The Beatles	4	April 20	7
April 6	"Honey" (#3)	Bobby Goldsboro	1	April 13	10
April 6	"Cry Like a Baby"	The Box Tops	2	April 27	6
April 13	"Quinn the Eskimo (Mighty Quinn)"	Manfred Mann	10	April 13	2
April 20	"Dance to the Music"	Sly and the Family Stone	8	April 20	2
April 20	"I Got the Feelin'"	James Brown	6	April 27	3
April 27	"Tighten Up" (#10)	Archie Bell & the Drells	1	May 18	9
May 4	"The Good, the Bad and the Ugly" (#8)	Hugo Montenegro	2	June 1	7
May 4	"A Beautiful Morning"	The Rascals	3	May 25	7
May 4	"Cowboys to Girls"	The Intruders	6	May 18	5
May 4	"The Unicorn"	The Irish Rovers	7	May 25	4
May 11	"Mrs. Robinson" (#9)	Simon & Garfunkel	1	June 1	7
May 18	"Love Is All Around"	The Troggs	7	May 18	1
May 18	"Do You Know the Way to San Jose"	Dionne Warwick	10	May 18	3
May 25	"Ain't Nothing Like the Real Thing"	Marvin Gaye & Tammi Terrell	8	May 25	2
May 25	"Shoo-Be-Doo-Be-Doo-Da-Day"	Stevie Wonder	9	May 25	1
June 1	"Mony Mony"	Tommy James and the Shondells	3	June 15	5
June 1	"Yummy Yummy Yummy"	Ohio Express	4	June 15	5
June 8	"This Guy's in Love with You" (#7)	Herb Alpert	1	June 22	8
June 8	"MacArthur Park"	Richard Harris	2	June 22	5
June 8	"Think"	Aretha Franklin	7	June 15	4
June 15	"The Look of Love"	Sérgio Mendes & Brasil '66	4	July 6	5
June 22	"Angel of the Morning"	Merrilee Rush & the Turnabouts	7	June 29	4
June 22	"Reach out of the Darkness"	Friend & Lover	10	June 22	3
June 29	"The Horse"	Cliff Nobles & Co.	2	June 29	6
June 29	"Here Comes the Judge"	Shorty Long	8	July 6	3
July 6	"Grazing in the Grass"	Hugh Masekela	1	July 20	7
July 6	"Lady Willpower"	Gary Puckett & The Union Gap	2	July 20	6
July 6	"Jumpin' Jack Flash"	The Rolling Stones	3	July 6	6
July 13	"Stoned Soul Picnic"	The 5th Dimension	3	July 27	7
July 13	"Indian Lake"	The Cowsills	10	July 13	3
July 20	"Hello, I Love You"	The Doors	1	August 3	9
July 20	"Classical Gas"	Mason Williams	2	August 3	6
July 20	"Hurdy Gurdy Man"	Donovan	5	August 3	5
August 3	"Sunshine of Your Love" (#6)	Cream	5	August 31	5
August 3	"Turn Around, Look at Me"	The Vogues	7	August 17	4
August 10	"People Got to Be Free" (#5)	The Rascals	1	August 17	9
August 17	"Born to Be Wild"	Steppenwolf	2	August 24	6
August 17	"Light My Fire"	José Feliciano	3	August 31	6
August 24	"I Can't Stop Dancing"	Archie Bell & the Drells	9	August 24	3
August 24	"Stay in My Corner"	The Dells	10	August 24	3
August 31	"Harper Valley PTA"	Jeannie C. Riley	1	September 21	9
August 31	"You Keep Me Hangin' On"	Vanilla Fudge	6	August 31	1
August 31	"You're All I Need to Get By"	Marvin Gaye & Tammi Terrell	7	September 14	3
September 7	"1, 2, 3, Red Light"	1910 Fruitgum Company	5	September 14	5
September 7	"The House That Jack Built"	Aretha Franklin	6	September 7	3
September 14	"Hey Jude" † (#1)	The Beatles	1	September 28	14
September 14	"Hush"	Deep Purple	4	September 21	3
September 21	"The Fool on the Hill"	Sérgio Mendes & Brasil '66	6	September 28	2
September 21	"I've Gotta Get a Message to You"	Bee Gees	8	September 28	6
September 28	"Fire"	The Crazy World of Arthur Brown	2	October 19	7
September 28	"Girl Watcher"	The O'Kaysions	5	October 5	5
September 28	"Slip Away"	Clarence Carter	6	October 5	3
October 5	"Little Green Apples"	O. C. Smith	2	October 26	8
October 5	"I Say a Little Prayer"	Aretha Franklin	10	October 5	1
October 12	"Midnight Confessions"	The Grass Roots	5	November 2	5
October 12	"My Special Angel"	The Vogues	7	October 12	2
October 12	"Over You"	Gary Puckett & The Union Gap	7	October 26	4
October 19	"Say It Loud – I'm Black and I'm Proud"	James Brown	10	October 19	1
October 26	"Those Were the Days"	Mary Hopkin	2	November 2	7
October 26	"Elenore"	The Turtles	6	November 2	4
November 2	"Love Child"	Diana Ross & The Supremes	1	November 30	11
November 2	"Hold Me Tight"	Johnny Nash	5	November 9	5
November 2	"White Room"	Cream	6	November 9	5
November 9	"Magic Carpet Ride"	Steppenwolf	3	November 30	7
November 16	"Abraham, Martin and John"	Dion	4	December 14	7
November 16	"Who's Making Love"	Johnnie Taylor	5	December 7	8
November 30	"For Once in My Life"	Stevie Wonder	2	December 28	8
December 7	"I Heard It Through the Grapevine"	Marvin Gaye	1	December 14	11
December 7	"Stormy"	Classics IV	5	December 28	5
December 14	"I Love How You Love Me"	Bobby Vinton	9	December 14	4
December 21	"Both Sides, Now"	Judy Collins	8	December 21	1

† — "Hey Jude" also made its Hot 100 debut on September 14.

=== 1967 peaks ===
List of Billboard Hot 100 top ten singles in 1968 which peaked in 1967
Top ten entry date	Single	Artist(s)	Peak	Peak date	Weeks in top ten
November 25	"Daydream Believer"	The Monkees	1	December 2	10
December 2	"I Heard It Through the Grapevine"	Gladys Knight & the Pips	2	December 16	9
December 9	"I Second That Emotion"	Smokey Robinson & The Miracles	4	December 16	7
December 9	"Hello, Goodbye"	The Beatles	1	December 30	8
December 16	"Boogaloo Down Broadway"	The Fantastic Johnny C	7	December 23	4
December 30	"Skinny Legs and All"	Joe Tex	10	December 30	3

=== 1969 peaks ===
List of Billboard Hot 100 top ten singles in 1968 which peaked in 1969
Top ten entry date	Single	Artist(s)	Peak	Peak date	Weeks in top ten
November 23	"Wichita Lineman"	Glen Campbell	3	January 11	9
December 28	"I'm Gonna Make You Love Me"	Diana Ross & the Supremes and The Temptations	2	January 11	8
December 28	"Cloud Nine"	The Temptations	6	January 4	3

== See also ==
- 1968 in music
- List of Billboard Hot 100 number ones of 1968
- Billboard Year-End Hot 100 singles of 1968
