= Simon Says (album) =

Studio album by 1910 Fruitgum Company
- Released: April 1968
- Genre: Bubblegum pop
- Length: 27:06
- Label: Buddah
- Producer: Super K Productions, Elliot Chiprut

1910 Fruitgum Company chronology
Simon Says (1968)	1, 2, 3, Red Light (1968)

Professional ratings
Review scores
Source	Rating
Allmusic	4/5 stars

Simon Says is the debut album by the American bubblegum pop group the 1910 Fruitgum Company on the Buddah Records label. Released in 1968, it included two songs that appeared on the Billboard Hot 100—the most from any of the group's albums—although it was not their highest-charting album. It's been debated whether or not the members of the band actually played on the album since the Ohio Express, another band put together by Super K Productions (headed by Jerry Kasenetz and Jeffry Katz), actually consisted of two groups: one that produced the records and another that toured and promoted the name. This claim is disputed by original drummer Floyd Marcus, who has stated that all five men listed really were behind the instruments.

The album cover featured film strips from a photo shoot of the band members, a design that presumably inspired the cover of Swedish pop group Secret Service's 1979 single "Oh Susie"/"Give Me Your Love."

== Track listing ==
No.	Title	Writer(s)	Length
1.	"Pop Goes the Weasel"	Elliot Chiprut	1:58
2.	"Keep Your Thoughts on the Bright Side"	Floyd Marcus	2:20
3.	"Magic Windmill"	Frank Jeckell	2:19
4.	"The Year 2001"	Floyd Marcus	1:51
5.	"Soul Struttin'"	Tony Orlando, Marty Thau	2:38
6.	"Simon Says"	Elliot Chiprut	2:14
7.	"May I Take a Giant Step (Into Your Heart)"	Elliot Chiprut	2:24
8.	"Bubblegum World"	Floyd Marcus	2:19
9.	"Happy Little Teardrops"	Elliot Chiprut	2:15
10.	"The Story of Flipper"	Pat Karwan	4:30
11.	"(Poor Old) Mr. Jensen"	Jerry Kasenetz, Jeff Katz, David Taxin	2:15

== Personnel ==
- Mark Gutkowski – lead vocals, organ
- Pat Karwan – lead guitar, vocals
- Frank Jeckell – rhythm guitar, vocals
- Steve Mortkowitz – bass guitar, vocals
- Floyd Marcus – drums, vocals

== Charts ==
Chart (1968)	Peak position
US Billboard 200	162

Singles

Year	Single	Chart	Peak position
1968	"Simon Says"	US Hot 100	4
1968	"May I Take a Giant Step (Into Your Heart)"	US Hot 100	63

== Releases ==
7-inch singles

- 1968/01/27 – BDA 24
1. "Simon Says" (Elliot Chiprut) – 2:19
2. "Reflections From The Looking Glass" (Frank Jeckell, Mark Gutkowski, Ted Gutkowski) – 3:04
- 1968/04/20 – BDA 39
1. "May I Take A Giant Step (Into Your Heart)" (Elliot Chiprut) – 2:24
2. "(Poor Old) Mr. Jensen" (Jerry Kasenetz/Jeff Katz/David Taxin) – 2:15

12" Album

- 1968/04 – BDM-1010 (Mono)
- 1968/04 – BDS-5010 (Stereo)

CD

- 1989 – Repertoire Records RR 4019-C
- 1992 – Unidisc Music BDK-5010
