= Chewy Chewy =

1968 song by Ohio Express

Single by Ohio Express

from the album Chewy Chewy
- B-side: "Firebird"
- Released: September 1968
- Genre: Rock; bubblegum pop
- Length: 2:38
- Label: Buddah Records
- Songwriters: Joey Levine; Artie Resnick
- Producers: Levine; Resnick

Ohio Express singles chronology
"Down At Lulu's" (1968)	"Chewy Chewy" (1968)	"Sweeter Than Sugar" (1969)

"Chewy Chewy" is a song by American band Ohio Express. Released in September 1968, it was written and produced by Joey Levine and Artie Resnick.

== Background and composition ==
The 2-minute-38-second song is in the key of C major, changing later in the song to C sharp / D flat major, with a tempo of 121 beats per minute.

The song makes countless references to candy and sugar, and the narrator compares these two sweet treats to the object of his affection, at some point calling her a "living box of candy wrapped up so very fine" with a "mouthful of such sweet things to say". Most of the song's remaining lyrics are nonsense.

It is among Ohio Express' three signature songs, as well as one of bubblegum music's most notable staples.

The instrumental pause at the song's midway point is very evocative of the opening notes of 'Then He Kissed Me' by The Crystals.

== Chart performance and reception ==
Billboard called it an "infectious, happy rhythm novelty in the vein of 'Yummy Yummy Yummy'", Cashbox called it a "slightly slower tongue-in-cheek rock offering that keeps in line with their bubblegum policy", and Record World called it a "cute bubble gum stick".

The song debuted at number one on the Bubbling Under Hot 100 chart for the week of October 12, 1968, before entering the Billboard Hot 100 at number 72, going on to peak at number 15, and spending a total of 13 weeks on the chart. It also charted in Canada, Australia and the Philippines.

Clips of the song were used in the top 40 hit "Moonflight" by Vic Venus in 1969. It has also been covered by James Last later that year, and by The Vindictives in 1994.

== Charts ==
=== Weekly charts ===
Chart (1968–69)	Peak position
Argentina	5
Australia (Go-Set)	6
Canada (RPM)	2
Mexico (Hits of the World)	3
New Zealand (Listener)	1
Philippines (Hits of the World)	2
US Billboard Hot 100	15

=== Year-end charts ===
Chart (1968)	Peak position
Australia (KMR)	38
Canada (RPM)	60

Chart (1969)	Peak position
United States (Cashbox)	91
Canada (RPM)	100
