= Indian giver =

American term of expression

"Indian giver" is a phrase used to describe a person who gives a "gift" and later wants it back or who expects something of equivalent worth in return for the item. It is based on cultural misunderstandings that took place between the early European colonists and the Indians of North America with whom they traded. Often, the Europeans viewed an exchange of items as gifts and believed that they owed nothing in return to the Indigenous people. On the other hand, the Indigenous people saw the exchange as a form of trade or equal exchange and so they had differing expectations of their guests.

The phrase is used to describe a negative act or shady business dealings.

== Etymology ==
The phrase originated, according to the researcher David Wilton, in a cultural misunderstanding that arose when European settlers first encountered Native Americans after the former had arrived in North America at the end of 15th century. In his 2004 book Word Myths: Debunking Linguistic Urban Legends, Wilton writes:

To an Indian, the giving of gifts was an extension of this system of trade and a gift was expected to be reciprocated with something of equal value. Europeans, upon encountering this practice, misunderstood it, considering it uncouth and impolite. To them, trade was conducted with money and gifts were freely given with nothing expected in return. So this native practice got a bad reputation among the white colonists of North America and the term eventually became a playground insult.

== Usage ==
The phrase was first noted in 1765 by Thomas Hutchinson, who characterized an Indian gift as "a present for which an equivalent return is expected", which suggests that the phrase originally referred to a simple exchange of gifts. In 1860, however, in John Russell Bartlett's Dictionary of Americanisms, Bartlett said that the phrase was being used by children in New York to mean "one who gives a present and then takes it back".

In 1969, American bubblegum pop band 1910 Fruitgum Company released the album Indian Giver. The titular song peaked at #5 on the Billboard Hot 100, and #1 in Canada.

As recently as 1979, the phrase was used in mainstream media publications, but in the 1997 book The Color of Words: An Encyclopaedic Dictionary of Ethnic Bias in the United States, the writer and editor Philip H. Herbst says that although the phrase is often used innocently by children, it may be interpreted as offensive, and The Copyeditor's Handbook (1999) describes it as objectionable.

== See also ==
- Gift economy
- Savage (pejorative term)
- Competitive altruism
- Ethnic slurs
- Indian summer
- Potlatch
- Reciprocity
