= Artie Resnick =

American songwriter (born 1937)

- Born: Arthur Resnick; 1937 (age 88–89)
- Origin: Brooklyn, New York City, U.S.
- Genres: Pop
- Instrument: Vocals

Arthur Resnick (born 1937) is an American songwriter, record producer and musician. His most successful songs as a writer include "Under the Boardwalk" (co-written with Kenny Young), "Good Lovin'" (co-written with Rudy Clark), and "Yummy Yummy Yummy" (co-written with Joey Levine).

== Biography ==
Resnick grew up in New York City and attended Valley Forge Military Academy.

He had his first success as a songwriter in 1961 with "Chip Chip", a top 10 hit for Gene McDaniels co-written by Resnick, Jeff Barry and Clifford Crawford.

Another early success was "Under the Boardwalk", co-written with Kenny Young and a US no. 4 hit for The Drifters in 1964. It was covered by The Rolling Stones in 1964 and was released as a single-only in Australia, South Africa and Rhodesia. It peaked at no. 1 in the first two and at 2 in Rhodesia. It appeared on their albums 12 X 5 and The Rolling Stones No. 2.

Resnick and Young also wrote "One Kiss for Old Times Sake" and "A Little Bit of Heaven", both hits for Ronnie Dove in 1965. With Rudy Clark, Resnick co-wrote "Good Lovin'"; first recorded by The Olympics, it became a US no.1 hit for The Young Rascals in 1966.

In 1966 he formed a recording group, The Third Rail, with his wife Kris — also a successful songwriter — and Joey Levine. Their single "Run Run Run" reached no.53 on the Billboard Hot 100 in 1967, and that same year the LP Id Music was released on Epic Records. Resnick and Levine established a songwriting and producing partnership as part of the Super K Productions bubblegum pop empire set up by Jerry Kasenetz and Jeffry Katz, writing hit songs for the Ohio Express ("Yummy Yummy Yummy", "Chewy Chewy", and "Mercy"), and the Kasenetz-Katz Singing Orchestral Circus ("Quick Joey Small (Run Joey Run)"). He also released a single, "Balloon Man", under his own name on White Whale Records in 1969.

In 1994, Resnick, together with Mark Barkan and Robert Harari, co-wrote and co-produced an album of horror-themed songs, Scaree Tales, which was also performed on Broadway.

Resnick, and his co-writer on "Under The Boardwalk" and "Sand In My Shoes," Kenny Young, were nominated for induction into the Songwriters Hall of Fame in 2012.
