= 1, 2, 3, Red Light =

1, 2, 3 Red Light

Studio album by 1910 Fruitgum Company
- Released: October 1968
- Genre: Bubblegum pop
- Length: 25:34
- Label: Buddah
- Producer: Super K Productions

1910 Fruitgum Company chronology
Simon Says (1968)	1, 2, 3 Red Light (1968)	Goody Goody Gumdrops (1968)

Professional ratings
Review scores
Source	Rating
Allmusic	2.5/5 stars

1, 2, 3 Red Light, the second album by American bubblegum pop group the 1910 Fruitgum Company, was released six months after their debut album, Simon Says. The title song written by Sal Trimachi and Bobbi Trimachi, was the albums' only hit single for the band, peaking at #5 on the Billboard Hot 100, with both the album and the single just barely missing the success of their first release.

As with their previous album there has been questions about who played what. Original drummer Floyd Marcus has stated that he still played on the records even when a new drummer, Rusty Oppenheimer, was brought in. This does not seem to be the case for this album, as Oppenheimer receives a writing credit on the album but also does not perform on it as Marcus has explained that a number of session musicians were brought in to record new backing tracks for Mark Gutkowski to sing over while the band was out touring. This is supported by former Super K Productions staff writer and producer, Steve Dworkin, who, in an email to Unofficial 1910 Fruitgum Company Home Page creator Jonathan Gatarz, has listed the names of the session musicians.

== Track listing ==
No.	Title	Writer(s)	Length
1.	"1, 2, 3, Red Light"	Sal Trimachi; Bobbi Trimachi	2:07
2.	"The Song Song"	Steve Dworkin; Gary Willet	2:30
3.	"Shirley Applegate"	Mark Gutkowski; Ted Gutkowski	2:04
4.	"The Mighty Quinn"	Bob Dylan	3:04
5.	"Yummy, Yummy, Yummy"	Joey Levine; Artie Resnick	2:18
6.	"9, 10, Let's Do It Again"	Sal Trimachi; Bobbi Trimachi	2:05
7.	"The Book"	Floyd Marcus	2:26
8.	"Sister John"	Gutkowski; Gutkowski	2:10
9.	"Take Away"	Marcus	2:22
10.	"Lookin' Back"	Pat Karwan	2:26
11.	"Blue Eyes and Orange Skies"	Gutkowski; Rusty Oppenheimer; Gutkowski; Karwan	2:00

== Personnel ==
- Mark Gutkowski – vocals
- Kenny Laguna – keyboards
- Steve Feldman – keyboards
- Jimmy Calvert – lead guitar
- Paul Nauman – rhythm guitar
- Norman Marzano – bass guitar
- Joe D'Andrea – drums

== Charts ==
Chart (1968)	Peak position
US Billboard Top LPs	163

Singles

Year	Single	Chart	Peak position
1968	"1, 2, 3, Red Light"	Canada RPM Top Singles	1
1968	"1, 2, 3, Red Light"	New Zealand (Listener)	3
1968	"1, 2, 3, Red Light"	South Africa Springbok Top 20	2
1968	"1, 2, 3, Red Light"	US Billboard Hot 100	5
1968	"1, 2, 3, Red Light"	US Cashbox Top 100	3

== Releases ==
Album

- BDS 5022

Singles

- BDA 54 7" (July 1968)
1. "1, 2, 3, Red Light" (Sal Trimachi/Bobbi Trimachi) – 1:55
2. "Sticky, Sticky" (Jerry Kasenetz/Jeff Katz) – 2:05
