= Simon Says (disambiguation) =

Simon Says is a children's game.

Simon Says may also refer to:

== Electronic games ==
- Simon (game), an electronic game, often referred to as Simon Says
- Simon Says, a game made for the Magnavox Odyssey on game card 2, alongside Ski, Fun Zoo, and Percepts

== Music ==
- Simon Says (band), a Californian band
- Simon Says (album), an album by 1910 Fruitgum Company
  - "Simon Says" (1910 Fruitgum Company song), a song on the album
- "Simon Says" (Laleh song)
- "Simon Says" (Pharoahe Monch song)
- "Simon Says", a song by Clawfinger from their album A Whole Lot of Nothing
- "Simon Says", a song by Drain STH from their album Freaks of Nature
- "Simon Says", a song by Marnie Stern from This Is It and I Am It and You Are It and So Is That and He Is It and She Is It and It Is It and That Is That
- "Simon Says", a song by NCT 127 from their repackaged album Regulate

== Film and television ==
- Simon Sez, a 1999 action film starring Dennis Rodman
- Simon Says (film), a 2006 horror film
- "Simon Says" (The Outer Limits), the 2000th episode of The Outer Limits
- Simon Says, a 1971 unsold gameshow pilot starring Bob Barker
- "Simon Says", 21st episode of the fifth season of Cheers notable for a guest appearance by John Cleese
- "Simon Says", 7th episode of the first season of Almost Human
- "Simon Says" (Inside No. 9), a 2021 TV episode
- "Simon Says!", a 1988 episode of The Raccoons
- "Simon Says", a 2013 episode of Sesame Street

== See also ==
- "Simon Said", an episode of Supernatural
