= Giuliano e i Notturni =

Italian Pop band

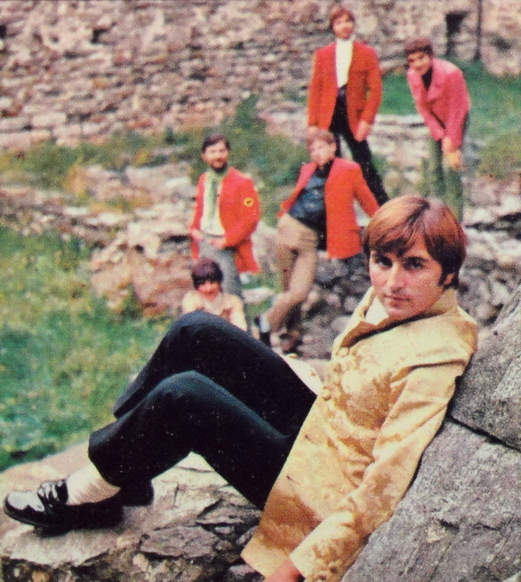
Giuliano e i Notturni, 1969.

Giuliano e i Notturni were an Italian pop group active in the late 1960s.

The group performed bubblegum pop; "Il ballo di Simone", a cover of the 1910 Fruitgum Company's song "Simon Says", became the group's major hit. It peaked at third place on the Italian hit parade and became an instant classic.

== Discography ==
Album

- 1968 – Giuliano e i Notturni (Ri-Fi, RFL-ST 14032)

Singles

- 1968 – "Il ballo di Simone" (Ri-Fi, RFN-NP 16257)
- 1968 – "La giostra della felicità" (Ri-Fi, RFN-NP 16323)
- 1969 – "Ragazzina ragazzina" (Ri-Fi, RFN-NP 16351)
- 1969 – "E sono solo" (Ri-Fi, STP-NP 92002/3)
