= Jerry Kasenetz =

American record producer (1943–2025)

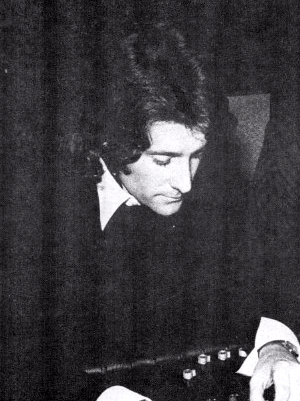
- Kasenetz in 1974
- Born: Jerrold H. Kasenetz; May 5, 1943; New York City, New York, U.S.
- Died: December 6, 2025 (aged 82)
- Education: University of Arizona
- Occupation: Record producer

Jerrold H. Kasenetz (May 5, 1943 – December 6, 2025) was an American bubblegum pop producer who worked with Jeffry Katz, the two working together as the Super K Productions company, to manufacture and produce bands such as Kasenetz-Katz Singing Orchestral Circus, The Music Explosion, 1910 Fruitgum Company, Crazy Elephant, and The Ohio Express.

== Early life ==
Kasenetz was born on May 5, 1943, in Brooklyn, New York, one of five children born to William and Rose (née Cohen) Kasenetz, both of whom worked in real estate. He grew up in Great Neck, a region in Long Island.

== Music career ==
Kasenetz met Jeffry Katz at the University of Arizona in the early 1960s. One of their first projects in the music business was as concert promoters, bringing the British band, Dave Clark Five, to the University of Arizona. Leaving the University of Arizona before their senior year, they moved back to New York and opened a small office on Broadway.

In 1966, their first production was with Christine Cooper on "S.O.S. Heart In Distress". The same year Kasenetz and Katz began working with an Ohio band, The Music Explosion, who recorded "Little Bit O' Soul". Kasenetz got in his car and drove across the country promoting the song to radio stations. In July 1967, the song reached No. 2 on the Billboard Hot 100 chart, selling a million copies. This solidified Kasenetz and Katz as music industry players.

Kasenetz and Katz created the concept of bubblegum music. Neil Bogart of Buddah Records asked the duo to come up with a marketing name for their music. Between 1967 and 1969, they recorded Ohio Express and 1910 Fruitgum Company, two acts commonly associated with Bubblegum pop music, and some of their hit songs, including "Beg, Borrow and Steal", "1, 2, 3, Red Light", "Goody, Goody Gumdrops", "Indian Giver", "Down at Lulu's", "Chewy Chewy", "Mercy", "Simon Says", "Special Delivery", "Yummy Yummy Yummy" and "Gimme Gimme Good Lovin'." In 1968, they created the Kasenetz-Katz Singing Orchestral Circus, a live album consisting of some of the bubblegum acts they were producing, as well as fictitious groups made up by the two, such as the St. Louis Invisible Marching Band.

In 1977, Kasenetz and Katz achieved another top twenty hit, "Black Betty" by the group Ram Jam, featuring Bill Bartlett of the Lemon Pipers.

Kasenetz and Jeffry Katz worked with the group Speedway Boulevard which was made up of three touring members of the Group Ram Jam; guitarist Gregg Hoffman, bassist Dennis Feldman and drummer Glenn Dove, and two other members, keyboardist Jordan Rudess and vocalist Roy Herring Jr.. Kasenetz and Katz produced their single, "(Think I Better) Hold On" and the self-titled album, which were released in 1980.

== Death ==
He died after a fall in Tampa, Florida, on December 6, 2025, at the age of 82. He is survived by two of his younger siblings, his two sons, and two grandchildren.
