= Indian Giver (album) =

Studio album by 1910 Fruitgum Company
- Released: April 1969
- Genre: Bubblegum pop
- Length: 24:59
- Label: Buddah

1910 Fruitgum Company chronology
Goody Goody Gumdrops (1968)	Indian Giver (1969)	Hard Ride (1969)

Indian Giver, the fourth studio album by American bubblegum pop group the 1910 Fruitgum Company, was released in 1969. The title song written by Bobby Bloom, Ritchie Cordell, and Bo Gentry peaked at #5 on the Billboard Hot 100. The song "Special Delivery" went to #38 on the Billboard Hot 100. The album went to 147 on the Billboard 200.

== Track listing ==
All songs written by Mark Gutkowski, Ted Gutkowski, Jerry Kasenetz, Jeffry Katz except where noted.

No.	Title	Length
1.	"Indian Giver" (Bobby Bloom, Ritchie Cordell, Bo Gentry)	2:30
2.	"No Good Annie"	2:21
3.	"I've Got to Have Your Love"	2:20
4.	"Good Good Lovin'"	2:08
5.	"Candy"	1:52
6.	"Special Delivery" (Bobby Bloom, Bo Gentry)	2:40
7.	"Game of Love"	2:00
8.	"Let's Make Love"	1:58
9.	"Groovy Groovy" (Mark Gutkowski, Ted Gutkowski, Jerry Kasenetz, Jeffry Katz, Rusty Oppenheimer)	2:20
10.	"Sweet Lovin'"	2:20
11.	"1910 Cotton Candy Castle" (Sal Trimachi)	2:30

== Charts ==
Album

Year	Chart	Peak Position
1969	Billboard Top 200	147

Singles

Year	Single	Chart	Peak Position
1968	"Indian Giver"	Billboard Hot 100	5

== Releases ==
Album

- BDS-5036

Singles

1. "Indian Giver"
2. "Special Delivery"
