= Jack Spector =

American radio disc jockey (1928–1994)

Jack Spector (September 15, 1928 – March 8, 1994) was an American radio disc jockey and TV host, particularly known for his work in New York City during the 1960s "rock radio" era.

== Career ==
=== 1955-1969 ===
Spector began his radio career in 1955. In 1960, he briefly hosted a syndicated television program, The Jack Spector Show, featuring teenagers dancing to popular hit records of the day, similar to Dick Clark's early TV shows. He was introduced on the program as "Smilin' Jack Spector." In 1961 became one of the original Good Guys on Top 40 station WMCA 570 AM.

In 1962, The Four Seasons released "Sherry," their first number one hit on the Billboard Hot 100. While there were many suggestions for the name of the song, it was called "Sherry" after Spector's eldest daughter. The song reached #1 on September 15, 1962, which was Spector's 34th birthday.

In late December 1963, WMCA, with Spector, earned the distinction of being the first New York City radio station to play Capitol Records' groundbreaking single "I Want to Hold Your Hand" by The Beatles. (Outside New York, the record's broadcast debut is widely accepted to have occurred earlier at WWDC 1260 AM in Washington, D.C.). WMCA was keen on playing new product and breaking new hits. Consequently, Spector became associated with the radio station most credited with introducing Beatlemania - and the "British Invasion" musical movement - to New York City listeners.

In 1969, while continuing to work as a DJ in New York, Spector released a single on Buddah Records under the name, "Vik Venus, Alias: Your Main Moon Man". The single, "Moonflight", was a novelty "break-in" record in the style of Dickie Goodman. In it, a reporter asks astronauts questions about a fictional "Achilles moon flight", with the responses taken from snippets of popular songs of the day. All response fragments used for this record were from previous hits on Buddah. The record peaked at #38 on the Billboard Hot 100 chart, and #20 in Canada.

=== 1970-1994 ===
WMCA moved to a talk radio format on September 21, 1970, one day after the final Top 40 broadcast. Spector stayed on as host of a sports talk show. Around 1971, Spector moved to WHN 1050 AM, then a vocal-based easy listening station. He remained for a while after WHN became a country music station in 1973. In 1974, Spector left WHN to go to WCBS-FM 101.1 where he hosted a 1955-1964 based Oldies show called "The Saturday Night Sock Hop" and another regular weekend shift. He was also a regular fill-in host there, substituting for full time DJs over the years. In 1983, Cousin Brucie began doing every third Saturday night of the month. Spector remained at WCBS-FM until the Spring of 1985.

Later in 1985, Spector joined WNBC 660 AM as the original host of "Sports Night", eventually replaced by Dave Sims. Spector usually began his show as Howard Stern was wrapping up his afternoon program. The two would often banter on the air about Spector's life in radio. Spector then went to WPIX-FM 101.9, which was playing an adult contemporary format. Upon the station's change to new adult contemporary (NAC) and soon after to smooth jazz, he became one of the first on air personalities on the renamed WQCD "CD 101.9." Spector also owned a retail optical store for reliable income during times when he was not on the air.

Late in 1988, Spector left WQCD and joined the staff of WHLI 1100 in Hempstead, New York, playing an Adult Standards format for Long Island listeners. That station began mixing in some rock and roll oldies by the early '90s. After participating in a few "Radio Greats" weekends at WCBS-FM, Jack Spector returned to 101.1 as a part-time swing announcer in 1993 while also working five days a week at WHLI.

== Death ==
On March 8, 1994, shortly after starting a recording of Louis Prima's I'm In The Mood For Love, he suffered an apparent heart attack and collapsed. Following a long silence after the song had finished, radio station employees ran into the studio and found Spector on the floor. Repeated attempts to revive him failed. He was pronounced dead at Winthrop University Hospital. He was 65.

Spector is buried at Beth Moses Cemetery in Farmingdale, New York. After his death, Howard Stern, his colleague at WNBC, said Jack was one of the few fellow disc jockeys he liked, and who liked him. Stern credits Spector for having the wisdom to own an eyeglasses optical store, for times when his radio career had interruptions.

== Sources ==
- Joel Whitburn, The Billboard Book of Top 40 Hits. 7th edn, 2000
