= List of Billboard Hot 100 number ones of 1968 =

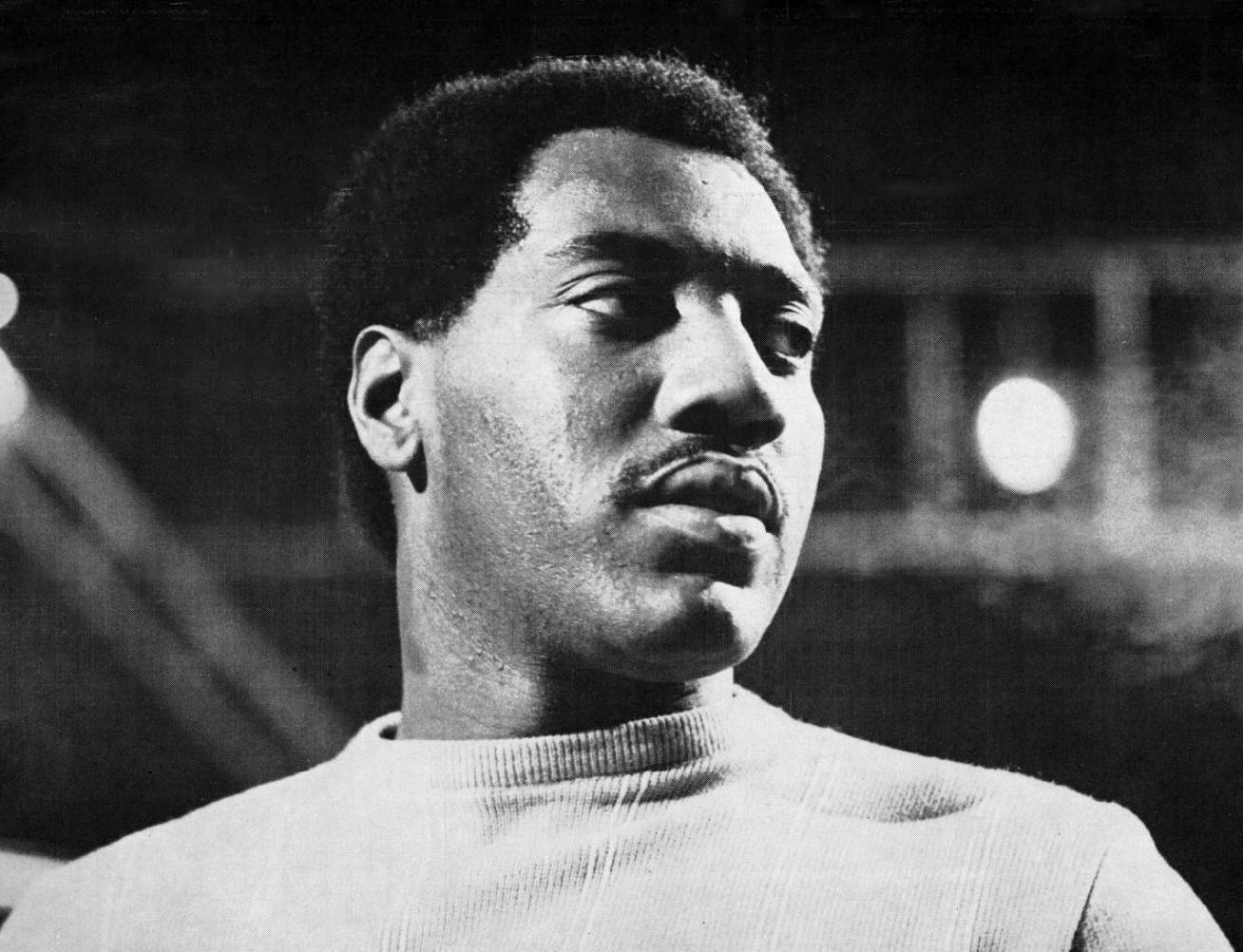
Otis Redding, who had died the previous year, topped the chart with "(Sittin' On) The Dock of the Bay", the first time an artist had achieved a posthumous number one.

The Billboard Hot 100 is a chart published since August 1958 by Billboard magazine which ranks the best-performing singles in the United States. In 1968, it was compiled based on a combination of sales and airplay data sourced from surveys of retail outlets and playlists submitted by radio stations respectively. During the year, 16 singles spent time at number one.

In the year's first issue of Billboard, the Beatles were at number one with "Hello, Goodbye", retaining the position from the final chart of 1967. They held the top spot for the first two weeks of the new year and then returned to number one in September with "Hey Jude". The latter song spent nine weeks atop the chart, tying the record for the longest unbroken run at number one on the Hot 100, set by "Theme from A Summer Place" by Percy Faith in 1960. The two chart-toppers took the band's total to 16 in less than five years. The Beatles were the only act with more than one number one during 1968 and their total of 11 weeks in the peak position during the year was more than twice that achieved by any other act. After "Hello, Goodbye", the next six chart-toppers were all by acts reaching number one for the first time: John Fred and his Playboy Band, the Lemon Pipers, Paul Mauriat, Otis Redding, Bobby Goldsboro, and Archie Bell & the Drells. Mauriat's "Love Is Blue", the first Hot 100 number one by a French act, was an instrumental version of "L'amour est bleu", performed by Vicky Leandros in the 1967 Eurovision Song Contest. Redding, who had died in an airplane crash in December 1967, was the first artist to achieve a number one posthumously when "(Sittin' On) The Dock of the Bay" reached the top spot three months later.

Goldsboro's "Honey" was a triple Billboard chart-topper, reaching number one on both the Hot Country Singles and Easy Listening charts in addition to the Hot 100. Despite this success, it was the only top 10 entry he achieved on the Hot 100. Four more acts gained their first Hot 100 number ones during the second half of the year: Herb Alpert, Hugh Masekela, Jeannie C. Riley, and Marvin Gaye. Alpert had topped Billboard's Easy Listening chart several times, but had never previously reached number one on the Hot 100. Similarly, Gaye had achieved four previous number ones on the magazine's R&B chart, but "I Heard It Through the Grapevine" was his first single to achieve sufficient pop crossover to top the Hot 100. It is one of several 1968 number ones to have been included on Rolling Stone magazine's list of the 500 Greatest Songs of All Time; in 2004, the magazine ranked "Hey Jude" at number 8, "(Sittin' On) The Dock of the Bay" at number 28, and "I Heard It Through the Grapevine" at number 80.

== Chart history ==
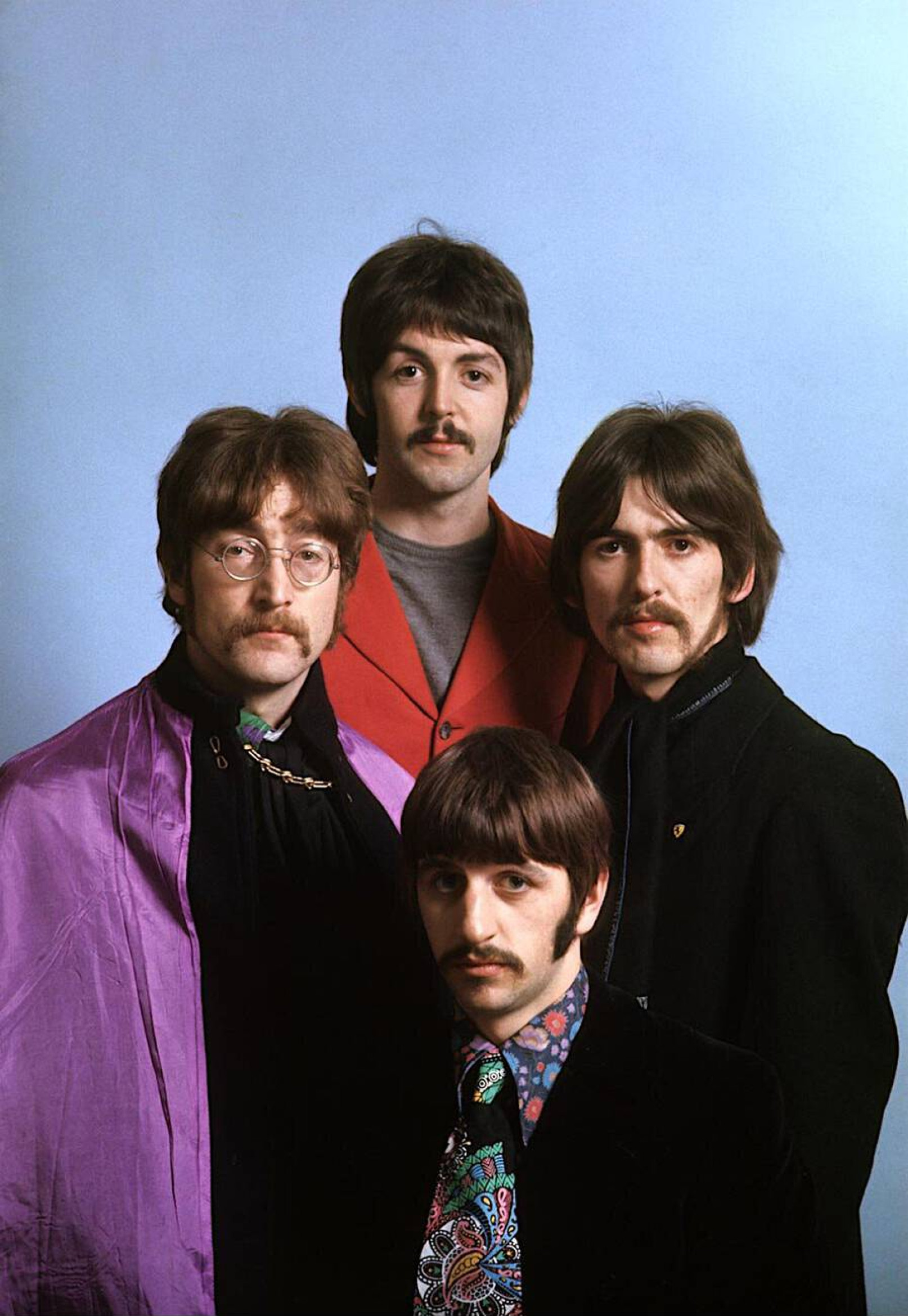
The Beatles were the only act with two number ones during 1968.

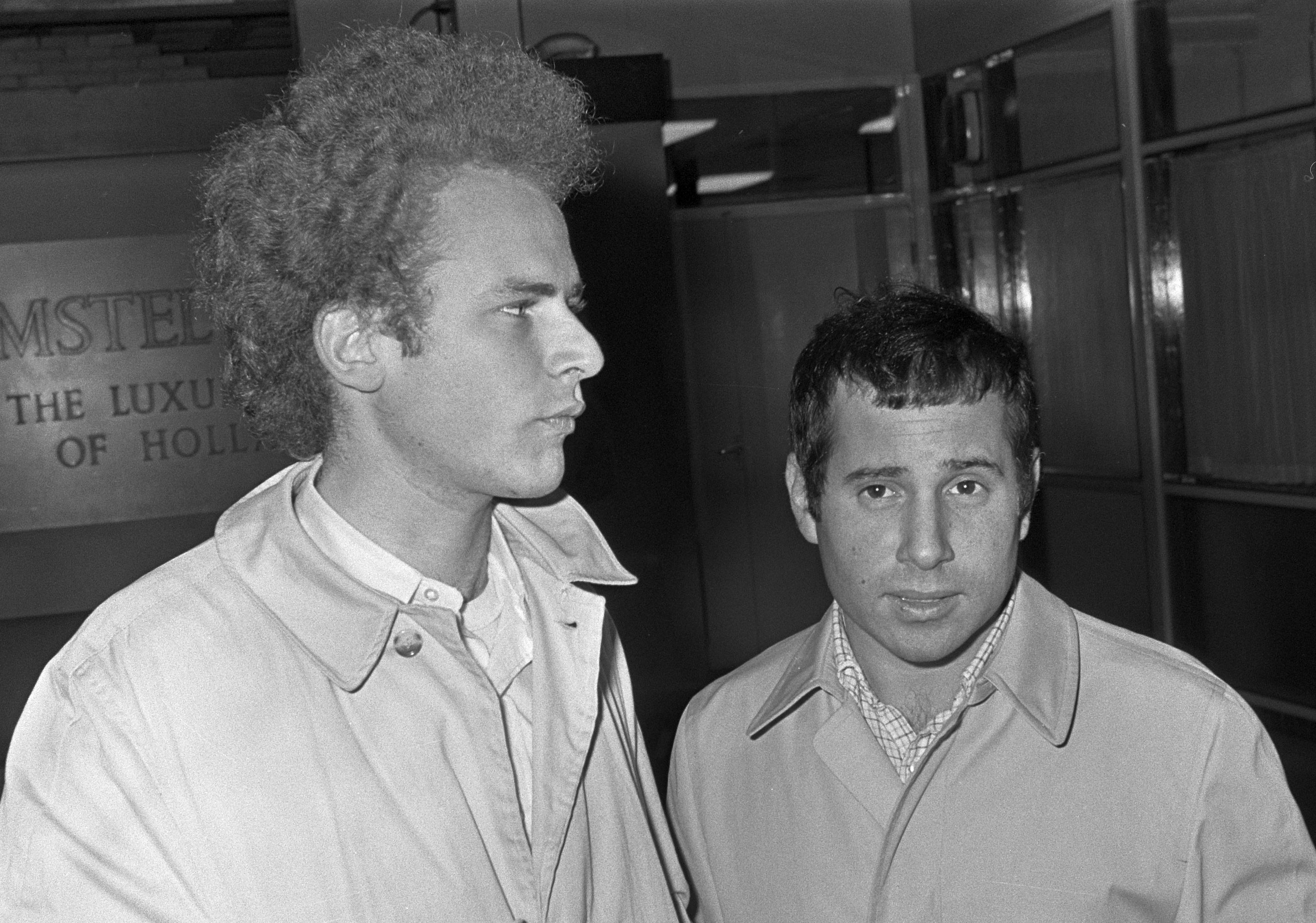
Simon & Garfunkel scored a number one in 1968 with "Mrs. Robinson".

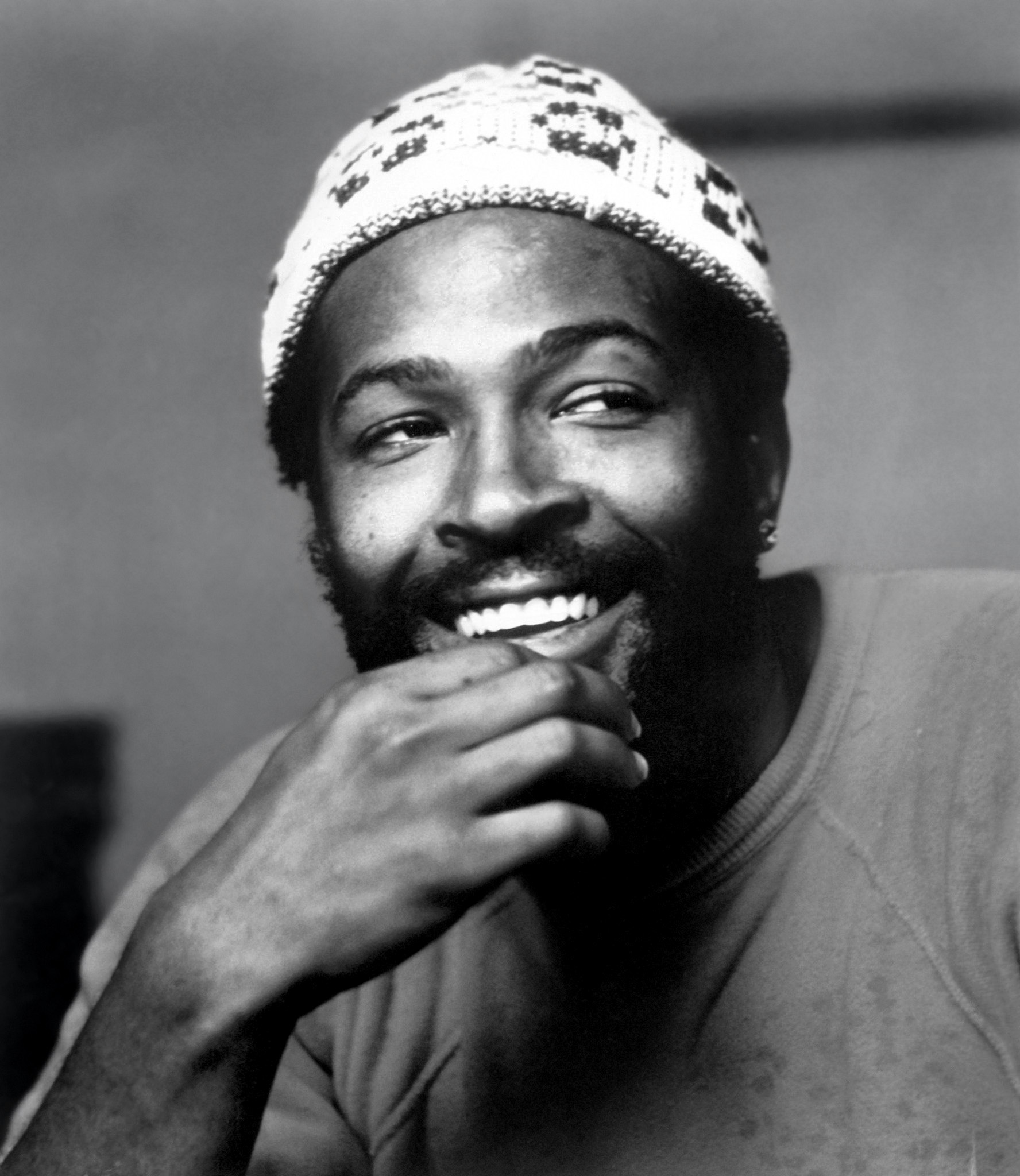
Marvin Gaye scored his first number one with "I Heard It Through the Grapevine".

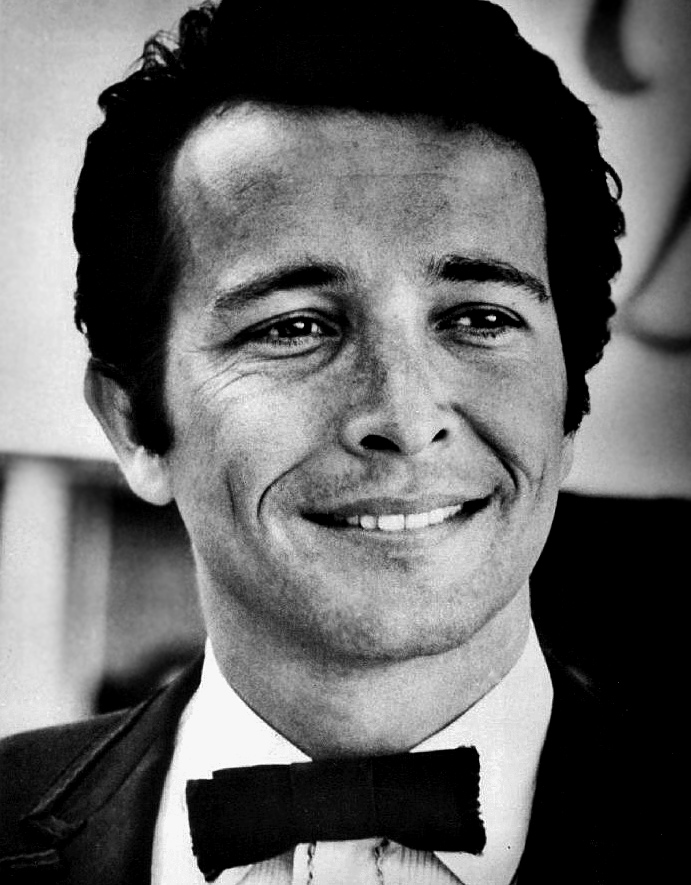
Herb Alpert had his first chart-topper with "This Guy's in Love with You".

Chart history
No. (Note: The "No." column indicates the numerical sequence of number ones in Hot 100 history.)	Issue date	Title	Artist(s)	Ref.
195	January 6	"Hello, Goodbye"	The Beatles	
195	January 13	"Hello, Goodbye"	The Beatles	
196	January 20	"Judy in Disguise (With Glasses)"	John Fred and his Playboy Band	
196	January 27	"Judy in Disguise (With Glasses)"	John Fred and his Playboy Band	
197	February 3	"Green Tambourine"	The Lemon Pipers	
198	February 10	"Love Is Blue"	Paul Mauriat	
198	February 17	"Love Is Blue"	Paul Mauriat	
198	February 24	"Love Is Blue"	Paul Mauriat	
198	March 2	"Love Is Blue"	Paul Mauriat	
198	March 9	"Love Is Blue"	Paul Mauriat	
199	March 16	"(Sittin' On) The Dock of the Bay"	Otis Redding	
199	March 23	"(Sittin' On) The Dock of the Bay"	Otis Redding	
199	March 30	"(Sittin' On) The Dock of the Bay"	Otis Redding	
199	April 6	"(Sittin' On) The Dock of the Bay"	Otis Redding	
200	April 13	"Honey"	Bobby Goldsboro	
200	April 20	"Honey"	Bobby Goldsboro	
200	April 27	"Honey"	Bobby Goldsboro	
200	May 4	"Honey"	Bobby Goldsboro	
200	May 11	"Honey"	Bobby Goldsboro	
201	May 18	"Tighten Up"	Archie Bell & the Drells	
201	May 25	"Tighten Up"	Archie Bell & the Drells	
202	June 1	"Mrs. Robinson"	Simon & Garfunkel	
202	June 8	"Mrs. Robinson"	Simon & Garfunkel	
202	June 15	"Mrs. Robinson"	Simon & Garfunkel	
203	June 22	"This Guy's in Love with You"	Herb Alpert	
203	June 29	"This Guy's in Love with You"	Herb Alpert	
203	July 6	"This Guy's in Love with You"	Herb Alpert	
203	July 13	"This Guy's in Love with You"	Herb Alpert	
204	July 20	"Grazing in the Grass"	Hugh Masekela	
204	July 27	"Grazing in the Grass"	Hugh Masekela	
205	August 3	"Hello, I Love You"	The Doors	
205	August 10	"Hello, I Love You"	The Doors	
206	August 17	"People Got to Be Free"	The Rascals	
206	August 24	"People Got to Be Free"	The Rascals	
206	August 31	"People Got to Be Free"	The Rascals	
206	September 7	"People Got to Be Free"	The Rascals	
206	September 14	"People Got to Be Free"	The Rascals	
207	September 21	"Harper Valley PTA"	Jeannie C. Riley	
208	September 28	"Hey Jude"	The Beatles	
208	October 5	"Hey Jude"	The Beatles	
208	October 12	"Hey Jude"	The Beatles	
208	October 19	"Hey Jude"	The Beatles	
208	October 26	"Hey Jude"	The Beatles	
208	November 2	"Hey Jude"	The Beatles	
208	November 9	"Hey Jude"	The Beatles	
208	November 16	"Hey Jude"	The Beatles	
208	November 23	"Hey Jude"	The Beatles	
209	November 30	"Love Child"	Diana Ross & the Supremes	
209	December 7	"Love Child"	Diana Ross & the Supremes	
210	December 14	"I Heard It Through the Grapevine"	Marvin Gaye	
210	December 21	"I Heard It Through the Grapevine"	Marvin Gaye	
210	December 28	"I Heard It Through the Grapevine"	Marvin Gaye	

== Number-one artists ==
List of number-one artists by total weeks at number one
Weeks at No. 1	Artist
11	The Beatles
5	Paul Mauriat
5	Bobby Goldsboro
5	The Rascals
4	Otis Redding
4	Herb Alpert
3	Simon & Garfunkel
3	Marvin Gaye
2	John Fred and his Playboy Band
2	Archie Bell & the Drells
2	Hugh Masekela
2	The Doors
2	Diana Ross & the Supremes
1	The Lemon Pipers
1	Jeannie C. Riley

== See also ==
- 1968 in music
- List of Cash Box Top 100 number-one singles of 1968
- List of Billboard number-one singles
- List of Billboard Hot 100 top-ten singles in 1968
- List of Billboard Hot 100 number-one singles from 1958 to 1969
