= Kasenetz-Katz Singing Orchestral Circus =

US musical group

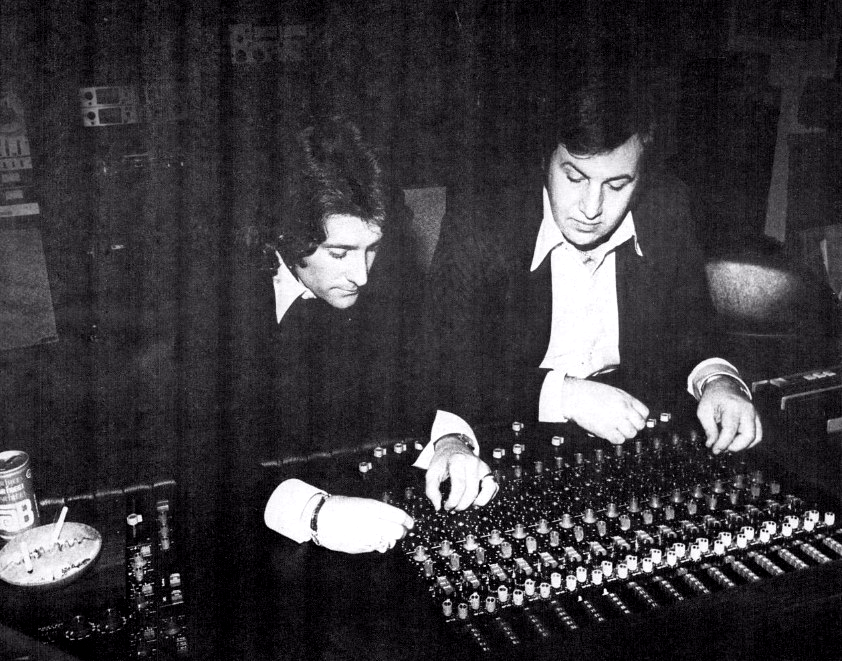
Jerry Kasenetz (left) and Jeffry Katz in 1974

The Kasenetz-Katz Singing Orchestral Circus was a bubblegum "supergroup" created by record producers Jerry Kasenetz and Jeffry Katz, consisting of various Super K Production groups.

== Original cast recording ==
For the first album, the fictitious concept was to take eight Kasenetz-Katz produced groups and bring them together for a "live" performance at Carnegie Hall on 7 June 1968. The roster included:

- 1910 Fruitgum Company
- Ohio Express
- Music Explosion
- Lt. Garcia's Magic Music Box
- Teri Nelson Group
- 1989 Musical Marching Zoo
- J.C.W. Rat Finks
- St. Louis Invisible Marching Band

According to the inner gatefold cover's liner notes, the "supergroup" consisted of 46 members. However, the album cover itself only shows 33 members (plus Kasenetz and Katz in tuxedos) while the individual inner cover photos total 37 (excluding the non-existent St. Louis Invisible Marching Band, whose photo is represented by a white block).

Of the 10 studio tracks used for this LP (not including the dialogue tracks), live audiences were dubbed into two: "Little Bit Of Soul" and "Simon Says".

=== Members ===
To add to the confusion of the actual number of participants, the LP package came with a page of stamps with each member of the "supergroup", including their names and the individual group he or she represents. The members of The Teri Nelson Group (except Teri Nelson herself) are shown as INVISIBLE BAND on the stamps.

Side 2 opens up with Music Explosion leader Jamie Lyons announcing the individual members of the newer or lesser-known groups. Some of the names mentioned do not coincide with the members shown on the stamps.

== Second album ==
For Super K's second effort (renamed "Kasenetz-Katz Super Circus"), the roster was reduced to five groups. Remaining were The 1910 Fruitgum Company, Ohio Express and Music Explosion, with the other groups replaced by Shadows Of Knight (who had just been acquired by Super K and signed to Buddah's Team label) and White Whale label group Professor Morrison's Lollipop (formerly the Coachmen of Lincoln, Nebraska). Despite these representations, the tracks were actually recorded by studio musicians with lead vocals by Ohio Express lead vocalist Joey Levine.

Unlike the first album, this was more of a straightforward studio album without the "concept" theme. It yielded the Top 25 hit "Quick Joey Small (Run Joey Run)", which also became a Top 20 British hit. Also included were the Shadows Of Knight's minor hit "Shake", but with Levine's vocals replacing Jim Sohns' original vocal track.

== 1969 and beyond ==
After a failed attempt to combine bubblegum music with the likes of composers Beethoven, Mozart and others with the album Classical Smoke (as "Kasenetz-Katz Orchestral Circus"), the K-K concept popped up occasionally in the 1970s but came to an end with a final single in 1977.

== 2009 ==
Kasenetz and Katz released an album in 2009, calling themselves Kasenetz and Katz Allstarz Band, featuring Jaymee Lynn Frankel, Lianne Frankel, Lisa Ganz, Kiirstin Marilyn, Donna & Laura Macaluso, Don Chaffin and more.

== Discography ==
=== Singles ===
Year	Single	Chart Positions		
Year	Single	US	UK	AU
1968	"Down in Tennessee"	124	-	-
1968	"Quick Joey Small (Run Joey Run)"	25	19	33
1969	"I'm in Love with You"	105	-	-
1969	"Embrasez-Moi"	-	-	-
1970	"When He Comes"	-	-	-
1970	"Bubblegum March"	-	-	-
1971	"Symphony #9"	-	-	-
1975	"Mama Lu"	-	-	-
1977	"Heart Get Ready for Love"	-	-	-

=== Albums ===
- Kasenetz-Katz Singing Orchestral Circus—Buddah BDS-5020—1968

Intro / We Can Work It Out/Count Dracula / Place In The Sun/Jamie Lyons Intro. / You've Lost That Lovin' Feeling / (Poor Old) Mr. Jensen / Down In Tennessee / Intro (Jamie Lyons introduces the new groups) / Little Bit Of Soul / Simon Says / Latin Shake / Mrs. Green / Hey Joe / Yesterday/All Gone ("Taps")

- Kasenetz-Katz Super Circus—Buddah BDS-5028—1968

Quick Joey Small (Run Joey Run) / Let Me Introduce You (To The Kasenetz-Katz Orchestral Circus) / Easy To Love / Log On Fire / Shake / I'm In Love With You / New York Woman / Up In The Air / I Got It Bad Your You / Down At Lulu's / The Super Circus

- Classical Smoke (Kasenetz-Katz Orchestral Circus) -- Super K SKS-6001—1969

Symphony #9 /G Minor Symphony / Evening Star / Fugue / La Traviata / New World Symphony / Bouree / Nocturne / Blue Danube Waltz / Orgy Of Lust / String Quartet
