= Indian Giver (song) =

Single by 1910 Fruitgum Company

from the album Indian Giver
- B-side: "Pow Wow"
- Released: January 1969
- Genre: Bubblegum
- Length: 2:30
- Label: Buddah
- Songwriters: Bobby Bloom; Ritchie Cordell; Bo Gentry

1910 Fruitgum Company singles chronology
"Goody Goody Gumdrops" (1968)	"Indian Giver" (1969)	"Special Delivery" (1969)

"Indian Giver" is a song written by Bobby Bloom, Ritchie Cordell, and Bo Gentry. It was first recorded by 1910 Fruitgum Company for their 1969 album, Indian Giver.

== Chart performance ==
The song went to #5 on The Billboard Hot 100 in 1969 and was on the charts for 13 weeks. The song also went to #1 in Canada and in South Africa, and #4 in Australia. It was named the #50 song of 1969 on the Cashbox charts. The song was certified as a gold disc in March 1969.

== Certifications ==
Certifications for "Indian Giver"
Region	Certification	Certified units/sales
United States (RIAA)	Gold	1,000,000^{^}
^{^} Shipments figures based on certification alone.

== B-side ==
Also released as a single, its B-side, officially titled "Pow Wow", was actually a song called "Bring Back Howdy Doody", deliberately pressed backwards as a way of deterring radio stations from playing it.. "Bring Back Howdy Doody" was later recorded by another Buddah bubblegum music group produced by Jerry Kasenetz and Jeffry Katz called Flying Giraffe.
