= Jeffry Katz =

American music producer

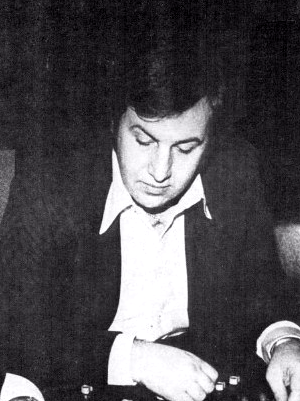
- Katz in 1974

Background information
- Born: May 20, 1943 (age 83); Brooklyn, New York, U.S.
- Genres: Bubblegum pop; pop; rock
- Occupation: Record producer
- Years active: 1966–present
- Label: Buddah

Jeffry Katz (born May 20, 1943) is an American music producer, one of the first proponents of bubblegum pop.

== Early life ==
Jeffry Katz was born in Brooklyn, New York, to a Jewish family.

== Music career ==
He is one half of a hitmaking duo with Jerry Kasenetz, the two working together as the Super K Productions company. He and Kasenetz have manufactured and produced Kasenetz-Katz Singing Orchestral Circus, The Music Explosion, 1910 Fruitgum Company, Crazy Elephant and The Ohio Express.

Kasenetz and Katz met at the University of Arizona in the early 1960s. One of their first projects in the music business was as concert promoters bringing the British band the Dave Clark Five to the University of Arizona. Leaving the University of Arizona before their senior year they moved back to New York and opened a small office on Broadway in Manhattan.

In 1966, their first production was with Christine Cooper on "S.O.S. Heart In Distress." The same year Kasenetz and Katz began working with an Ohio band, The Music Explosion who recorded "Little Bit O' Soul." In July 1967, the song reached No. 2 on the Billboard Hot 100 chart, selling a million copies. This solidified Kasenetz and Katz as music industry players.

Kasenetz and Katz created the concept of bubblegum music. Neil Bogart of Buddah Records asked the duo to come up with a marketing name for their music. Between 1967 and 1969 some of their bubblegum music releases are "Beg, Borrow and Steal," "1, 2, 3, Red Light," "Goody, Goody Gumdrops," "Indian Giver", "Down at Lulu's," "Chewy, Chewy," "Mercy," "Simon Says," "Special Delivery," "Yummy Yummy Yummy" and "Gimme Gimme Good Lovin'."

In 1977, Kasenetz and Katz achieved another top twenty hit "Black Betty" by the group Ram Jam, featuring Bill Bartlett of the Lemon Pipers.

Three touring members of the group Ram Jam: guitarist Gregg Hoffman, bassist Dennis Feldman, and drummer Glenn Dove, together with keyboardist Jordan Rudess and vocalist Roy Herring Jr. became the group Speedway Boulevard. Working with producers Katz and Kasenetz, they recorded the single, "(Think I Better) Hold On" and the self-titled album, which were released in 1980.
