= 1, 2, 3, Red Light (song) =

Single by 1910 Fruitgum Company

from the album 1, 2, 3, Red Light
- B-side: "Sticky Sticky"
- Released: July 1968
- Genre: Bubblegum pop; garage rock
- Length: 2:07
- Label: Buddah
- Songwriters: Sal Trimachi, Bobbi Trimachi
- Producer: Super K Productions

1910 Fruitgum Company singles chronology
"May I Take a Giant Step (Into Your Heart)" (1968)	"1, 2, 3, Red Light" (1968)	"Goody Goody Gumdrops" (1968)

"1, 2, 3, Red Light" is a song written by Sal Trimachi and Bobbi Trimachi and was recorded by 1910 Fruitgum Company for their 1968 album, 1, 2, 3, Red Light. The song charted highest in Canada, going to number 1 on the RPM 100 national singles chart in 1968. In the same year in the US, it went to number 5 on the Billboard Hot 100 and was on the charts for 13 weeks.

The song went to number 2 in South Africa, number 3 on the New Zealand charts, and in Australia it reached number 7. It was named the number 39 song of 1968 on the Cashbox charts. The song was certified as a gold disc in September 1968.

== Background ==
Bubblegum pop was marketed to preteens as the evolving genre of rock music was beginning to target older adolescents and adults with darker lyrics and heavier rhythms. The simple structure of the songs and non-political content of bubblegum pop appealed to a younger audience. Many of the songs in the bubblegum pop genre like "1, 2, 3, Red Light" were intended to be singles within the budget of that younger preteen audience. "1, 2, 3, Red Light" became one of the biggest hits of the genre.

== Chart performance ==
=== Weekly charts ===
Chart (1968)	Peak position
Australia	7
Canadian RPM Top Singles	1
New Zealand	3
South Africa	2
Spain (Promusicae)	23
US Billboard Hot 100	5
US Cashbox Top 100	3

=== Year-end charts ===
Chart (1968)	Rank
Canada	42
US Billboard Hot 100	48
US Cash Box Top 100	39

== Certifications ==
Certifications for "1, 2, 3, Red Light"
Region	Certification	Certified units/sales
United States (RIAA)	Gold	1,000,000^{^}
^{^} Shipments figures based on certification alone.

== Cover versions ==
- Ohio Express released a cover version of the song on their 1969 album, Chewy, Chewy.
- Talking Heads played the song at some of their early shows and a live version can be found on the bootleg Gimme Heads.
- Welsh band The Pooh Sticks covered the song in 1988 and released it on Fierce Recordings as part of a 5-disc series of one-sided seven inch singles, artistically scratched on their B sides.
