= Yummy Yummy Yummy =

- Cover of the German release

Single by Ohio Express

from the album Ohio Express
- B-side: "Zig Zag"
- Released: April 1968
- Genre: Bubblegum; garage rock
- Length: 2:30
- Label: Buddah
- Songwriters: Arthur Resnick and Joey Levine
- Producers: Jerry Kasenetz; Jeffry Katz; Joey Levine; Arthur Resnick; Engineer: Bruce Staple

Ohio Express singles chronology
"Try It" (1968)	"Yummy Yummy Yummy" (1968)	"Down at Lulu's" (1968)

Official audio
- "Yummy Yummy Yummy" on YouTube

"Yummy Yummy Yummy" is a song by Artie Resnick and Joey Levine, first recorded by Ohio Express in 1968. Their version reached No. 4 on the U.S. Pop Singles chart in June and No. 5 on the UK Singles Chart. It has since been covered by many artists. Ohio Express was a studio concoction and none of the "official" members appear on the record. Joey Levine sang lead vocals.

Time magazine included it in its 2011 list of songs with silly lyrics. It ranked No. 2 in Dave Barry's Book of Bad Songs.

The single's flip-side, titled "Zig-Zag", is an instrumental version of the 1910 Fruitgum Company's "(Poor Old) Mr. Jensen" played in reverse.

== Later uses ==
"Yummy Yummy Yummy" has been used in the films Super Size Me, Cloudy with a Chance of Meatballs 2, and Fear and Loathing in Las Vegas.

In television, the song has been used on The Simpsons in the episodes "Itchy & Scratchy: The Movie" and "The Heartbroke Kid"; in the Monty Python's Flying Circus episode "How Not to Be Seen" (credited to the fictional band "Jackie Charlton and the Tonettes"); in the Futurama episode "Saturday Morning Fun Pit"; and a short musical segment of Timon and Pumbaa, where it is sung by the titular characters with modified lyrics.

The Beatles borrowed the introduction of the Ohio Express single for their 1968 White Album opener "Back in the U.S.S.R." New wave band The Cars would borrow the opening guitar chords for their 1978 hit "Just What I Needed". Pop rock band Fountains of Wayne would then in turn borrow the riff for their 2003 hit "Stacy's Mom", with their opening riff being based on "Just What I Needed".

== Chart performance ==
=== Weekly charts ===
Chart (1968–1969)	Peak position
Australia (Go-Set)	6
Austrian Singles Chart	5
Canadian RPM Top Singles	1
Dutch Top 40	27
Irish Singles Chart	5
New Zealand (Listener)	1
South Africa (Springbok)	6
Swiss Singles Chart	8
UK Singles Chart	5
US Billboard Pop Singles	4
US Cash Box Top 100	4

=== Year-end charts ===
Chart (1968)	Rank
Canada	10
South Africa	20
US Billboard Hot 100	38
US Cash Box	11

== Cover versions ==
- Labelmates The 1910 Fruitgum Company recorded their own vocals over the same backing track for their album 1, 2, 3 Red Light
- Tony Kenny And The Sands - on the Major Minor Label (MM 573) - A Tribune Recording - 1968
- Pinky and Perky - On their album Pinky and Perky's Hit Parade in 1968.
- Giorgio Moroder - as single A-side in 1968 (as Giorgio).
- Baccara recorded a Euro Pop version in the 1970s.
- Julie London - for her album Yummy, Yummy, Yummy in 1968.
- The Residents - for their album The Third Reich 'n Roll in 1975.
- L7 included it on their album Fast & Frightening in 2016.
