= Simon Says (1910 Fruitgum Company song) =

Single by 1910 Fruitgum Company

from the album Simon Says
- B-side: "Reflections from the Looking Glass"
- Released: December 1967
- Genre: Bubblegum pop; garage rock
- Length: 2:21
- Label: Buddah BDA 24
- Songwriter: Elliot Chiprut
- Producers: Jeffry Katz, Jerry Kasenetz, Elliot Chiprut

1910 Fruitgum Company singles chronology
"Simon Says" (1967)	"May I Take a Giant Step" (1968)

"Simon Says" is a bubblegum pop song written by Elliot Chiprut and originally recorded in 1967 by the 1910 Fruitgum Company, becoming their most successful chart hit.

== History ==
The song was based on the children's game "Simon Says". Produced by Jerry Kasenetz, Jeffry Katz, and Chiprut, the single was issued by Buddah Records and entered the U.S. Hot 100 in January 1968, rising to No.4 on the chart. It was also a hit in the UK, where it reached No.2 on the singles chart.

It also was the title track on the first album by the 1910 Fruitgum Company.

In Italy, it was covered by the group Giuliano e i Notturni with the title "Il ballo di Simone", and charted No.3 on the Italian hit parade. In 1968, French singer Claude François also had a hit with the song under the French title "Jacques a Dit". The same year, the Greek beat group The Charms recorded a Greek-language version titled "Τρελλοκόριτσο" (To Trelokoritso). Volker Rosin, a German songwriter for children's music, published another cover version with "Cowboy Joe" in 2002.

In Yugoslavia, the song was covered in 1969 by Crveni Koralji, with Serbo-Croatian lyrics and entitled "Otac je rekao".

With lyrics by Uno Asplund, Flamingokvintetten recorded the song in Swedish as "Nynna en sång" and released it as a single in 1968.

In August 1989, a version of this song sung by Elizabeth Watts was used in an episode of Playdays.

== Chart history ==
=== Weekly charts ===
1910 Fruitgum Company

Chart (1968)	Peak position
Australia (Kent Music Report)	2
Canada RPM Top Singles	1
Ireland (IRMA)	5
Italy (hitparadeitalia)	1
New Zealand (Listener)	4
South Africa (Springbok)	1
Spain (Promusicae)	6
UK Singles Chart	2
U.S. Billboard Hot 100	4
U.S. Cash Box Top 100	2

Dickie Rock & Miami

Chart (1968)	Peak position
Ireland (IRMA)	1

=== Year-end charts ===
Chart (1968)	Rank
Canada	20
South Africa	4
U.S. Billboard Hot 100	33
U.S. Cash Box	24

== Certifications ==
Certifications for "Simon Says"
Region	Certification	Certified units/sales
United States (RIAA)	Gold	1,000,000^{^}
^{^} Shipments figures based on certification alone.
