= Super K Productions =

- Founded: 1960
- Country of origin: United States

Super K Productions was a 1960s American recording production company under Buddah Records, headed by producers Jerry Kasenetz and Jeffry Katz, whose groups specialized in bubblegum pop. Their biggest successes were The Ohio Express, The 1910 Fruitgum Company, Crazy Elephant and The Music Explosion. Super K also had its own label of the same name in 1969, operated under Buddah Records, but it did not last as the bubblegum genre had already started to decline in popularity.

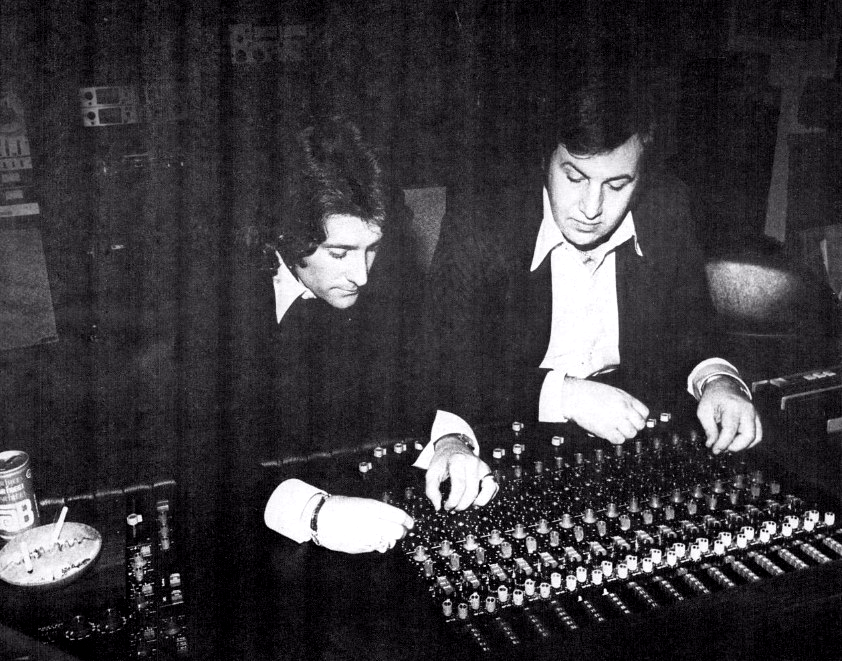
Jerry Kasenetz (left) and Jeffry Katz in 1974

Not a company to depend on double-sided hits, many (but not all) Super K-produced singles were pressed with B-sides of either tracks recorded backwards or studio group instrumentals. This method was also employed earlier by producers Phil Spector and Joe Meek as a way of pointing a radio DJ to the "right" side of the singles.

In the 1970s, they had a small Recording Studio and Production office in Great Neck, New York, on East Shore Drive, just north of Northern Blvd. on Long Island.

== Super K Production groups ==
- Crazy Elephant
- Bo Diddley (One single: "Bo Diddley 1969"/"Soul Train")
- Kasenetz-Katz Singing Orchestral Circus
- Music Explosion
- 1910 Fruitgum Company
- Ohio Express
- Professor Morrison's Lollipop
- Shadows Of Knight
