= Ohio Express =

American bubblegum pop band

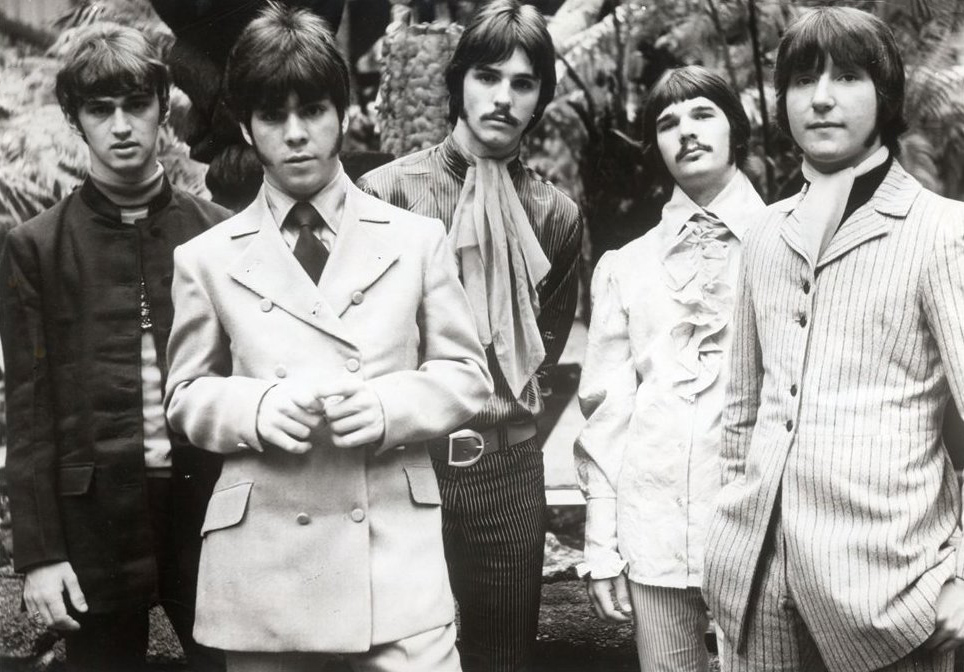
- L-to-R: Tim Corwin, Dean Kastran, Dale Powers, Buddy Bengert and Doug Grassel (touring group)

Background information
- Also known as: The Rare Breed; Sir Timothy and the Royals
- Origin: Mansfield, Ohio, U.S.
- Genre: Bubblegum
- Years active: 1967–present
- Labels: Cameo; Buddah
- Members: Tim Corwin; Jeff Burgess; Warren Sawyer; John Baker; Greg Weber; Stanley W Rust
- Past members: Bill Hutchman; Buddy Bengert; Michael Fenneken; Fred La Susa; Davy Keaton; Dale Powers; Doug Grassel; Jim Pfahler; Russell Powell; Ron Smallcomb; Dean Kastran; Joey Levine; Charles W. Lindecamp (Cee Jaye); Mike Brumm; Dennis Eggerton; Kirk Luther; Mark Norris; Bruce Knott; David Haag; Guy Hoffman; Dave Carmean; Les Commo
- Website: theohioexpress.com

The Ohio Express is an American bubblegum pop band formed in Mansfield, Ohio, in 1967. Though marketed as a band, it would be more accurate to say that the name "Ohio Express" served as a brand name used by Jerry Kasenetz's and Jeffry Katz's Super K Productions to release the music of a number of different musicians and acts. The best known songs of Ohio Express (including their best-scoring single, "Yummy Yummy Yummy") were actually the work of an assemblage of studio musicians working in New York, including singer/songwriter Joey Levine. Other recorded "Ohio Express" work included material recorded by an early group of Joe Walsh, as well as a later single written and sung by Graham Gouldman (which was performed by the four musicians who were later known as 10cc).

A band previously known as Sir Timothy and the Royals was renamed "The Ohio Express" and hired to promote the singles by appearing at all live performances. This is the same group photographed on the record covers.

== Career ==
=== Beginnings: The Rare Breed (1966–1967) ===
The question of who is the "real" Ohio Express is difficult to answer. The first record credited to The Ohio Express was "Beg, Borrow and Steal", a "Louie Louie" derivation which became a top 40 hit in the US and Canada in late 1967. However, exactly the same record had been issued by the Rare Breed in early 1966 on Attack Records. This failed nationally, though it did see regional chart action in New Hampshire and Utah.

The Rare Breed issued one more single in 1966 on Attack, "Come and Take a Ride in My Boat", which was a minor chart hit in the US southwest though also failed to chart nationally (the song hit No. 6 a year later for Every Mother's Son as "Come On Down to My Boat"). The Rare Breed then apparently had a dispute with Super K Productions and left the company, never to record again.

The band's recording of "Beg, Borrow & Steal" was then re-mixed and re-issued in August 1967 on Cameo Parkway Records, now credited to the Ohio Express (a name to which Super K Productions controlled all rights). The record was a No. 1 single in Columbus, Ohio, by early September and gradually became a hit across Canada and the US through the following months.

The otherwise exhaustively annotated Nuggets box set (which includes "Beg, Borrow and Steal") suggests the Rare Breed were from New York or New Jersey, but offers no other data. However, a 2003 interview and a 2009 YouTube post of a performance of "Beg, Borrow and Steal" identifies the members of the Rare Breed as John Freno (vocals, guitar), Barry Stolnick (keyboards), Joel Feigenbaum (rhythm guitar), Alexander "Bots" Narbut (vocals, bass) and Tony Cambria (drums), all originally from Brooklyn and the Bronx, New York.

=== Sir Timothy and the Royals take over (1967) ===
With no group available to promote the single by playing live dates, Super K Productions hired a Mansfield, Ohio band known as Sir Timothy & the Royals and renamed them the Ohio Express. The lineup consisted of Dale Powers (vocals, lead guitar), Doug Grassel (born Douglas Martin Grassel in Mansfield, Ohio; July 5, 1949 – September 21, 2013; rhythm guitar), Dean Kastran (bass), Jim Pfahler (born James William Pfahler in Mansfield, Ohio; August 12, 1948 – March 10, 2003; keyboards) and Tim Corwin (drums). This group toured as the Ohio Express, and their touring commitments (and Ohio home base) made it difficult for them to head into the New York-based Super K offices to record a follow-up single to "Beg, Borrow and Steal". Of the "official" group members, only Dale Powers (lead vocals) appeared on the second single credited to Ohio Express, "Try It", later covered by the Standells. The single stalled well outside the US Top 40, peaking at No. 83.

The group soon recorded an album called Beg, Borrow and Steal. It mixed the original Rare Breed title track with tracks recorded by the Ohio Express touring group, as well as tracks recorded by the Super K staff musicians with vocals by Powers. The LP came out on Cameo-Parkway Records of Philadelphia in the autumn of 1967. Unfortunately, the record label went into bankruptcy shortly after that and was purchased by music business mogul Allen Klein, who owns the masters to this day.

Two songs on the Beg, Borrow and Steal LP, "I Find I Think of You" and "And It's True", were actually recorded by the Kent, Ohio, band the Measles, led by Joe Walsh, later of the James Gang and the Eagles. In addition, the Measles recorded an instrumental version of "And It's True" (retitled "Maybe") which was placed on the B-side of the "Beg, Borrow and Steal" single.

=== The Joey Levine years (1968–1969) ===
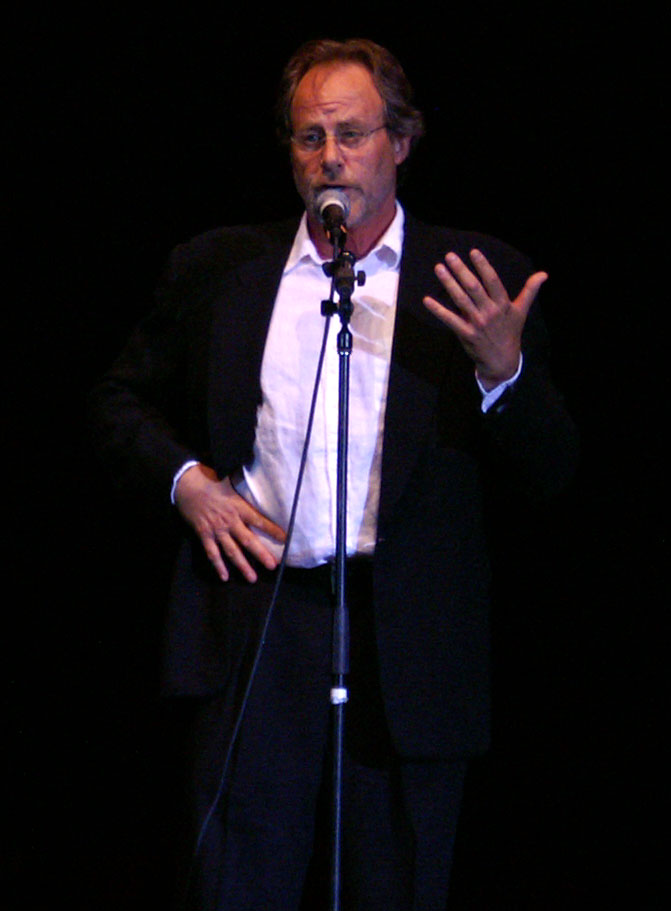
Joey Levine in concert, 2008

The Ohio Express then moved to the home label of bubblegum pop, Buddah Records. At the same time, Joey Levine (who had co-written "Try It") was coming up with new material for the Ohio Express at the behest of Super K Productions. He recorded a demo version of the track "Yummy Yummy Yummy" with Super K staff musicians and his own guide vocal for the Ohio Express to record over. However, Buddah head Neil Bogart liked the demo enough that he released the record "as is", with Levine's vocals intact and no input at all from the touring version of the Ohio Express. The song became an international hit, peaking at No. 4 US, No. 5 UK, No. 5 Ireland, No. 7 Australia and No. 1 Canada. Two months after its issue it had sold over one million copies, and was granted gold disc status by the R.I.A.A. in June 1968.

The success of the Levine-led "Yummy Yummy Yummy" set a pattern for the Ohio Express. They released four LPs and a multitude of singles for Buddah between 1968 and 1970, but the "official" group that appeared on album sleeves and at live shows contributed not a single note to their hit singles. For the year following the release of "Yummy Yummy Yummy", all Ohio Express singles were co-written and sung by Levine, with musical accompaniment by anonymous New York session musicians. Under this arrangement, in 1968 and 1969 the group scored three further top 40 hits in the US, Canada and Australia with "Down at Lulu's", "Chewy Chewy" and "Mercy". "Chewy Chewy" was the group's second million seller by March 1969. Also around this time, the group name lost the definite article, becoming "Ohio Express" for most releases from this point forward.

There are no known occasions of Levine performing with the "official" Ohio Express quintet, either live or in the studio. The five lads from Ohio, meanwhile, could only be heard on a few of the album tracks. Allegedly, the touring group was not even informed of the existence of "Chewy Chewy", the new single that had come out under their name — and when fans requested it at a live show, they were consequently unable to play it.

=== "Recycled" tracks (1968–1970) ===
Super K Productions often recycled tracks from one act to another, issuing exactly the same recording under two different band names. In addition to the Ohio Express hit "Beg, Borrow and Steal" (initially credited to the Rare Breed), fans have noted that various Ohio Express B-sides and album tracks were in fact initially issued and credited to other Super K acts. Examples include the B-side of the "Sausalito" single, "Make Love Not War", which was originally issued as "Road Runner" by the Music Explosion and the 1970 album track "Shake", originally issued by Kasenetz Katz Super Circus. As well, "Zig Zag," the B-side to "Yummy Yummy Yummy", was the instrumental track of 1910 Fruitgum Company's "(Poor Old) Mr. Jensen" cut to play backwards.

=== The Post-Levine era (1969–1970) ===
In early 1969, after five straight singles co-written and sung by Joey Levine (four of which made the US and Canadian Top 40), Levine grew dissatisfied with the amount of money he was receiving from his production deal, and left Super K Productions. The company then turned to other hands to write, produce and perform Ohio Express singles. The Ohio touring quintet was not among them.

After Levine left, The Ohio Express never again made the top 40 in North America, although three 1969 singles made the lower reaches of the US and Canadian singles charts. One later minor hit single, "Sausalito (is the Place to Go)" was co-written and sung by Graham Gouldman, and performed by the four musicians who later made up 10cc. Another late single, "Cowboy Convention", sneaked into the Australian top 40, peaking at No. 38.

By 1970, with the hits having stopped, the group name Ohio Express was quietly retired in 1972 (there was a one-shot 1973 Buddah release credited to Ohio Ltd.).

In 1975, Kasanetz and Katz briefly put together a new live band using the name the Ohio Express. The band performed at clubs on Long Island for a short while, and featured John Visconti on lead vocals and rhythm guitar, Irv Berner on lead guitar and vocals, Elliot Schwartz on keyboard and vocals and Angie on bass guitar. Len Napolitano filled in on drums for several performances. In 2017 Berner went on to help open and manage the Songbirds Guitar Museum in Chattanooga. The guitar museum closed its doors in 2020 due to the Covid pandemic. In 2022 Berner produced an Emmy Award winning documentary of the museum called Songbirds, with director Dagan Beckett and producer David Davidson.

Years later Tim Corwin revised another version of the band and began performing nationally and overseas. Corwin kept the band active, and filed for a service mark for the name Ohio Express, in 1999 without the consent of the record labels that own the rights to the name with the various master recordings. The Ohio Express recently has performed in Las Vegas, other casinos and most recently (2012) Corwin made an appearance on Cologne Television, performing "Yummy Yummy Yummy".

In the mid-1970s, Mansfield guitarist Mike Brumm, joined and remained in the group until the late 2000s.

=== The Ohio Express today ===
A new touring version of The Ohio Express was convened in the 1980s. Today, a line-up led by original drummer Tim Corwin on lead vocals, John Baker (Lead guitar), Stan Rust (Bass), Bill Hutchman (Drums), Jeff Burgess (Keyboard) and Warren Sawyer (Rhythm guitar and Keyboards) tours the oldies circuit.

On July 23, 1988, the original touring quintet of Powers, Kastran, Grassel, Pfahler and Corwin reunited for a "20 Year Reunion Concert" at the Renaissance Theater in their Mansfield hometown.

Two of the original touring group members have died: keyboardist/vocalist/songwriter Jim Pfahler died on March 10, 2003, at age 54, and rhythm guitarist Doug Grassel died of lung fibrosis on September 21, 2013, at age 64.

Bassist Dean Kastran became a member of The Cyrkle beginning in June 2021. He also plays bass and sings in the Eggerton-Kastran Group (a.k.a., EKG), an acoustic duo with vocalist/guitarist Denny Eggerton, and the five-piece band the Caffiends, both based in Mansfield, Ohio. Dale Powers is now a Christian music evangelist based in Mansfield, Ohio, and founded his own record label as well as website for his ministry. Dean Kastran plays bass in the Race Ministries Band and recorded tracks with Dale on his album of original songs titled "The Journey Within!".

On May 30, 2026, former Ohio Express members Dale Powers and Dean Kastran reunited with Tim Corwin to contribute to "Set Me Free," a single by the Ohio-based rock band The Bopper Brothers. The recording marked the first released recording since 1968 to feature all three musicians.

== Discography ==
=== Studio albums ===
Year	Album	US 200
1967	Beg, Borrow and Steal	—
1968	The Ohio Express	126
1969	Chewy Chewy	191
1969	Mercy	—
"—" denotes releases that did not chart.

=== Compilation albums ===
- The Very Best of the Ohio Express – Buddah BDS-5058 – 1970
- Ohio Express – Golden Classics – Collectibles – COL CD-0535 – 1994
- Yummy Yummy Yummy – The Best of the Ohio Express – Buddha 99800 – 2001

=== Singles ===
Year	A-side / B-side Both sides from same album except where indicated	Label	Chart positions				Album	Notes
Year	A-side / B-side Both sides from same album except where indicated	Label	US	AUS	CAN	UK	Album	Notes
1967	"Beg, Borrow and Steal" b/w "Maybe" (Non-album track)	Cameo 483	29	–	17	–	Beg, Borrow and Steal	A-side is the same exact recording as by The Rare Breed (Attack 1401)
1968	"Try It" b/w "Soul Struttin'"	Cameo 2001	83	–	–	–	Beg, Borrow and Steal	A-side is a version of The Standells' "banned" version
1968	"Yummy Yummy Yummy" b/w "Zig Zag" (Non-album track)	Buddah 38	4	7	1	5	Ohio Express	B-side is the instrumental backing of 1910 Fruitgum Co.'s "(Poor Old) Mr. Jensen" recorded backwards, a common practice of producers Kasenetz & Katz to discourage double-sided hits
1968	"Down at Lulu's" b/w "She's Not Comin' Home"	Buddah 56	33	23	25	–	Ohio Express	
1968	"Chewy Chewy" b/w "Firebird"	Buddah 70	15	6	2	–	Chewy, Chewy	
1969	"Sweeter Than Sugar" b/w "Bitter Lemon" (Non-album track)	Buddah 92	96	–	64	–	Mercy	B-side is the A-side recorded backwards
1969	"Mercy" b/w "Roll It Up" (Non-album track)	Buddah 102	30	23	24	–	Mercy	
1969	"Pinch Me (Baby, Convince Me)" b/w "Peanuts" (from Mercy)	Buddah 117	99	–	61	–	The Very Best of the Ohio Express	A-side lead vocal by Buddy Bengert
1969	"Sausalito (Is the Place to Go)" b/w "Make Love Not War" (Non-album track)	Buddah 129	86	64	71	–	The Very Best of the Ohio Express	A-side performed by the members of 10cc, 3 years before they adopted that name. Lead vocal by Graham Gouldman. B-side is the same exact recording as "Road Runner" by The Music Explosion (Laurie 3429, 1968)
1969	"Cowboy Convention" b/w "The Race (That Took Place)" (Non-album track)	Buddah 147	101	38	53	–	The Very Best of the Ohio Express	
1970	"Love Equals Love" b/w "Peanuts" (from Mercy)	Buddah 160	–	56	–	–	Non-album tracks	
1970	"Hot Dog" b/w "Ooh La La"	Super K 14	–	–	–	–	Non-album tracks	
1973	"Wham Bam" b/w "Slow and Steady"	Buddah 386	–	–	–	–	Non-album tracks	Shown as Ohio Ltd.

== Other sources ==
- Pages B1 and B2, Sandusky Register Newspaper, November 10, 1979
