= Buddah Records =

American record label

- Parent company: Sony Music Entertainment
- Founded: 1967
- Founder: Art Kass; Artie Ripp; Hy Mizrahi; Phil Steinberg
- Defunct: 2002
- Status: Defunct
- Distributor: Legacy Recordings (reissues)
- Country of origin: U.S.
- Location: New York City

Buddah Records (later known as Buddha Records) was an American record label founded in 1967 in New York City. The label was born out of Kama Sutra Records, an MGM Records-distributed label, which remained a key imprint following Buddah's founding. Buddah handled a variety of music genres, including bubblegum pop (the Ohio Express and the 1910 Fruitgum Company), folk rock (Melanie), blues rock (Captain Beefheart and His Magic Band), and soul (Gladys Knight & the Pips).

In addition to the Buddah imprint, the company distributed many other independent labels, including Kama Sutra Records (after Kama Sutra cut their distribution ties with MGM in 1969), Curtom Records (Curtis Mayfield), T-Neck Records (the Isley Brothers), Charisma Records (Genesis, Monty Python), Sussex Records (Bill Withers), Hot Wax Records (Holland-Dozier-Holland post-Motown productions) and smaller subsidiaries.

== History ==
Kama Sutra Records helped bolster MGM Records's profits during 1965 and 1966, primarily due to the success of Kama Sutra's flagship artists the Lovin' Spoonful. Kama Sutra's head, Art Kass, ultimately grew dissatisfied with his distribution deal with MGM and founded Buddah Records in 1967, with his Kama Sutra partners, Artie Ripp, Hy Mizrahi, Phil Steinberg, and (allegedly) Italian mobster John "Sonny" Franzese.

Kass brought in 24-year-old Neil Bogart to oversee Buddah's daily operations. Bogart had been an MGM General Manager in the early 1960s before taking a VP/Sales Director position at Cameo-Parkway Records. Bogart quickly enlisted Cameo-Parkway producers Jerry Kasenetz and Jeffry Katz, the Ohio Express (a band signed to Kasenetz's and Katz's Super K Productions firm), and ex-Cameo artists the Five Stairsteps into the new label. Buddah's first single was "Yes, We Have No Bananas"/"The Audition" by the Mulberry Fruit Band; the label's first album was Safe as Milk by Captain Beefheart & His Magic Band. Kass and Bogart also brought along the promotion department of Cameo-Parkway, which was shutting down.

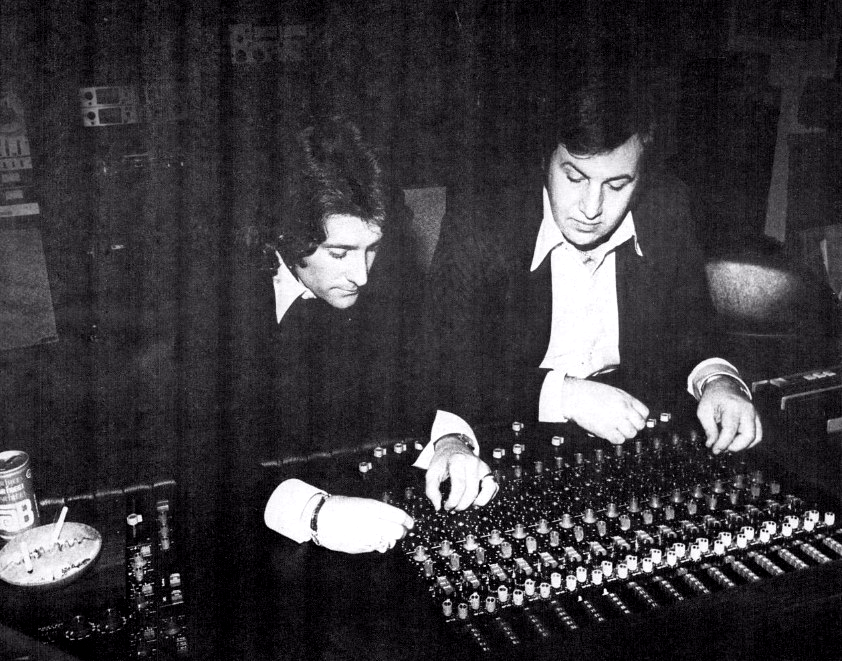
Jerry Kasenetz (left) and Jeffry Katz in 1974

Buddah initially made its mark as a bubblegum pop music label, with Ohio Express, the 1910 Fruitgum Company and Kasenetz-Katz Singing Orchestral Circus. However, it was the Lemon Pipers who gave Buddah its first No. 1 hit with "Green Tambourine", produced by Paul Leka, in February 1968.

The New York-area visual aids company Viewlex purchased a controlling interest in Buddah in 1968 with Ripp, Steinberg and Mizrahi departing the company at this time, leaving Kass and Bogart in charge.

As bubblegum music's popularity declined at the turn of the decade, Buddah branched out into gospel, folk-country, and R&B. Bogart, a master promoter, went to great lengths to generate hit singles for "top 40" radio airplay, and earned results. Music industry historian Bob Hyde estimated that during their heyday, Buddah and its associated labels charted over 100 singles, with about one in five singles issued by the company charting (vs. the ratio of one chart hit to 20 singles released that most "major labels" experienced in that time period). Hit singles released by Buddah and its associated labels during 1969–1973 included:

- The Brooklyn Bridge's "Worst That Could Happen" (1969)
- The Isley Brothers' "It's Your Thing" (1969)
- The Edwin Hawkins Singers' "Oh Happy Day" (1969)
- Lou Christie's "I'm Gonna Make You Mine" (1969)
- Melanie's "Lay Down (Candles in the Rain)" and "What Have They Done to My Song Ma" (1970)
- The Five Stairsteps' "O-o-h Child" (1970)
- The Jaggerz' "The Rapper" (written by and featuring a young Donnie Iris) (1970)
- 100 Proof (Aged in Soul)'s "Somebody's Been Sleeping in My Bed" (1970)
- Brewer & Shipley's "One Toke Over the Line" (1970)
- Ocean's "Put Your Hand in the Hand" (1971)
- Honey Cone's "Want Ads" (1971)
- Bill Withers' "Ain't No Sunshine" (1971), "Lean on Me" (1972) and "Use Me" (1972)
- Gallery's "Nice to Be With You" (1972)
- Curtis Mayfield's "Super Fly" and "Freddie's Dead" (1972)
- Gunhill Road's "Back When My Hair Was Short" (1973)
- Charlie Daniels' "Uneasy Rider" (1973)
- Stories' "Brother Louie" (1973)
- Gladys Knight & the Pips' "You're the Best Thing That Ever Happened to Me" and "Midnight Train to Georgia" (1973)

While Buddah primarily focused on singles, several of its album releases, including Brewer & Shipley's Tarkio (1970), Bill Withers' Still Bill (1972), and Curtis Mayfield's Super Fly (1972), also charted well during this period.

Neil Bogart created and distributed Brut Records via Buddah Records for the Brut Fabergé company.

Bogart left Buddah in 1974 to start his own label, Casablanca Records. Shortly before Bogart's departure, Gladys Knight & the Pips emerged as Buddah's biggest success. Previously signed to Motown Records' Soul imprint, Knight and the Pips released their biggest hits, including "Midnight Train to Georgia" and "You're the Best Thing That Ever Happened to Me", for Buddah.

Jazz session drummer Norman Connors became Buddah's musical director in 1976 and helped to foster the label's move toward R&B and disco (e.g., the Andrea True Connection's "More, More, More" (1976) and Chic's "Dance, Dance, Dance (Yowsah, Yowsah, Yowsah)" (1977); Chic's song charted upon its subsequent re-issue by Atlantic Records). Viewlex declared bankruptcy in 1976 and Art Kass purchased Buddah back from them, but the debt resulted in a substantial decline in the number of new releases. Arista Records took over distribution of Buddah from 1978 to 1983, with several artists, including Norman Connors and Phyllis Hyman, switching to Arista.

Buddah's final release of new product came in mid-1983, with Michael Henderson's R&B hit "Fickle" and the accompanying album of the same name. Kama Sutra's final issue came a year later, with the Fat Boys (formerly the Disco 3)'s self-titled single. Art Kass subsequently sold the label to Essex Entertainment, who managed the Buddah catalog until 1993, when they sold it to BMG. Kass formed another label, Casino Records, in partnership with former New York Dolls manager Marty Thau and concert promoter Terrell Braly, but this venture was not successful.

Reissue logo for Buddha Records

Buddah, now known as Buddha Records, was re-activated by BMG in September 1998 as a reissue label, which was subsequently reorganized as BMG Heritage Records on January 1, 2002. The Buddah/Buddha catalogue is now owned by Sony Music Entertainment and managed by Legacy Recordings.

== Subsidiary and affiliated labels ==
Buddah distributed many labels during its history, including the following:

- the wholly owned subsidiary Kama Sutra Records, from 1969 (when Kama Sutra's distribution deal with MGM Records expired) to 1976.
- Curtom Records, founded and owned by Curtis Mayfield, (1968–1974)
- Sussex Records, owned by Clarence Avant, (1971–1973)
- T-Neck Records, owned by the Isley Brothers, (1969–1973)
- Charisma Records, the U.K.-based label founded by Tony Stratton Smith, distributed 1971–1973. Buddah adopted the Gill Ultra Bold font Charisma used on their "Mad Hatter" label to create a uniform branding for its key labels (Buddah, Kama Sutra, Charisma) in 1973, although Charisma's distribution deal with Buddah ended later that year.
- Hot Wax Records, owned by Motown songwriting trio Holland-Dozier-Holland, 1969–1973.
- Cobblestone Records, a jazz label.
- Pavilion Records, a short-lived gospel music imprint best known for its release of "Oh Happy Day" by the Edwin Hawkins Singers in 1969.
- Studio One Records, the Jamaican label founded by Coxsone Dodd. Buddah released various selections from Studio One's back catalog in 1978.

Other Buddah subsidiaries or associated labels included Radio Active Gold (for reissue singles), Team, Super K, Royal American, Symbolic, Eleuthera, Ember, Pace, Desert Moon, Pi Kappa, Southwind, April, Thomas, Harbour, Music Merchant, National General, and Brut.

== Label design variations ==
- 1967: "Buddah Records" in stylized black letters at the bottom. Singles were designated with green labels, albums with red labels
- 1968–1972: Multi-color "kaleidoscope" label with silhouette of a Shiva deity (not Buddha) at the bottom of the label between the words "Buddah" and "Records" (same format for both singles and albums)
- 1972–1978: Maroon label with pink circle around outer edge, "Buddah Records" at top of label in white letters (deliberately borrowing from the Gill Ultra Bold font used on Charisma Records's "Mad Hatter" label for a uniform branding). Singles feature the head of a Buddha statue at the top of the label, albums show the entire statue at the bottom. When Arista took over distribution in 1978, the Arista logo and disclaimer were added by stamp at the bottom, starting with this label format
- 1978–1983: Black label with multi–colored "B" logo at top in a box, "Buddah" in white letters under the "B" in a subsection of the box, Arista logo and disclaimer at the bottom (same format for singles and albums)

== Associated labels artists ==
The following artists released at least one recording for Buddah Records, or for one of Buddah's subsidiaries/distributed labels as noted in parentheses:

- Gene Vincent
- Addrisi Brothers
- Paul Anka
- Baby Huey (Curtom)
- Len Barry
- The Belmonts
- Black Ivory
- Brewer & Shipley (Kama Sutra)
- The Brooklyn Bridge
- Bulldog
- George Burns
- Freddy Cannon
- Captain Beefheart and His Magic Band
- Chee-Chee and Peppy
- Chic
- Lou Christie
- Dennis Coffey & the Detroit Guitar Band (Sussex)
- Norman Connors
- Dave "Baby" Cortez (T-Neck)
- James Cotton
- Coven
- Papa John Creach
- Charlie Daniels Band (Kama Sutra)
- James Darren
- Dust (Kama Sutra)
- Exuma
- The Five Stairsteps (Curtom, Buddah)
- Flamin’ Groovies (Kama Sutra)
- David Frye
- Gallery (Sussex)
- Genesis (Charisma, Buddah)
- Barry Goldberg
- Steve Goodman
- Gorgoni, Martin & Taylor
- Gunhill Road (Kama Sutra)
- Bill Haley & His Comets (Kama Sutra)
- Edwin Hawkins Singers (Pavilion, Buddah)
- Michael Henderson
- Honey Cone (Hot Wax)
- Lena Horne
- Phyllis Hyman
- The Impressions (Curtom)
- Isis
- The Isley Brothers (T-Neck)
- Kasenetz-Katz Singing Orchestral Circus
  (aka K-K Super Circus)
- The Jaggerz (Kama Sutra)
- Waylon Jennings
- Gladys Knight & the Pips
- Robert Klein (Brut)
- The Lemon Pipers
- Lovin' Spoonful (Kama Sutra)
- Bobbi Martin
- Trade Martin
- Barbara Mason
- Curtis Mayfield (Curtom)
- Van McCoy
- Gary McFarland
- Rod McKuen
- Melanie
- Glenn Miller (reissue of RCA material)
- Monty Python (Charisma, Buddah)
- Melba Moore
- Motherlode
- The Music Explosion
- New Birth
- 1910 Fruitgum Company
- Ocean (Kama Sutra)
- Ohio Express
- Osibisa
- 100 Proof (Aged in Soul) (Hot Wax)
- Rena Scott
- Joan Rivers
- Rory Gallagher
- Biff Rose
- The Salt Water Taffy
- The Shangri-Las (Kama Sutra)
- Sha Na Na (Kama Sutra, Buddah)
- Shadows Of Knight (Team)
- Sixto Diaz Rodriguez (Sussex)
- The Smoke Ring
- Stories (Kama Sutra)
- Johnny Tillotson
- Cal Tjader
- The Tokens
- The Trammps
- Andrea True Connection
- Up With People (Pace-Buddah)
- Van der Graaf Generator (Charisma)
- Les Variations
- Velvet Crest
- Vik Venus
- Ben Vereen
- Wadsworth Mansion (Sussex)
- Jimmie Walker
- Jim Weatherly
- Jack Wild
- Johnny Winter
- Bill Withers (Sussex)
- Zalman Yanovsky (Buddah, Kama Sutra)

== Compilation discography and Billboard chart peak positions ==
- Bubble Gum Music Is the Naked Truth (#105) – Buddah BDS-5032—3/69

Hits by 1910 Fruitgum Company, Ohio Express, the Lemon Pipers, Kasenetz-Katz Singing Orchestral Circus, and Shadows of Knight

- Buddah's 360 Degree Dial-A-Hit—Buddah BDS-5039—1969

Tracks from Buddah, Kama Sutra and Curtom artists

- The Amazing Mets (#197) – Buddah 1969—11/69

Songs by the 1969 World Series Champions New York Mets (take note of the appropriately issued label number)

- Dick Clark / 20 Years Of Rock & Roll (#27) – Buddah BDS-5133—7/73

2-LP set of hits from 1953 to 1972. Original copies (with gatefold cover) include booklet and bonus 7" cardboard record "Inside Stories with Dick Clark" (reissues have none of the extras)

- The Buddah Box—Essex Entertainment 7060–1993

3-CD set of 45 tracks by various Buddah artists (1965–1984). Includes 28-page booklet with label history and photos

== Discography ==
- BDS–5000 – The Best from Buddah – Various Artists [1969]
- BDS 5001 – Safe As Milk – Captain Beefheart and His Magic Band [1967]
- BDS 5002 – The Beauty of Bruno – Tony Bruno [1967]
- BDS 5003 –
- BDS 5004 –
- BDS 5005 – Calypso Go Go – Lord Burgess and His Sun Islanders [1968]
- BDS 5006 –
- BDS 5007 – Penny's Arcade – Penny Nichols [1968]
- BDS 5008 – Our Family Portrait – 5 Stairsteps & Cubie [1968]
- BDS 5009 – Green Tambourine – Lemon Pipers [1968]
- BDS 5010 – Simon Says – 1910 Fruitgum Co. [1968]
- BDS 5011 – The Treasure of San Gennaro (Soundtrack) – Armando Trovaioli [1968]
- BDS 5012 – The Barry Goldberg Reunion – There's No Hole In My Soul [1968]
- BDS 5013 –
- BDS 5014 – Incense and Oldies – Various [1968]
- BDS 5015 – Checkmate – Lemon Pipers & the 1910 Fruitgum Co. [1968]
- BDS 5016 – Jungle Marmalade – Lemon Pipers [1968]
- BDS 5017 – Classmates – Various [1968]
- BDS 5018 – Ohio Express – Ohio Express [1968]
- BDS 5019 – Zalman Yanovsky Is Alive and Well in Argentina – Zalman Yanovsky [1968]
- BDS 5020 – Kasenetz–Katz Singing Orchestral Circus – Kasenetz–Katz Singing Orchestral Circus [1968]
- BDS 5021 – Finders Keepers – Salt Water Taffy [1968]
- BDS 5022 – 1, 2, 3, Red Light – 1910 Fruitgum Co. [1968]
- BDS 5023 – Steamed – Calliope [1969]
- BDS 5024 – Born To Be – Melanie [1969]
- BDS 5025 – George Burns Sings – George Burns [1969]
- BDS 5026 – Chewy, Chewy – Ohio Express [1969]
- BDS 5027 – Goody Goody Gum Drops – 1910 Fruitgum Co. [1969]
- BDS 5028 – Quick Joey Small/I'm In Love With You – Kasenetz–Katz Super Circus [1968]
- BDS 5029 – Barry Goldberg...and – Two Jews Blues [1969]
- BDS 5030 – Bob McAllister of Wonderama – Bob McAllister [5/69]
- BDS 5031 – Sun Rise – Eire Apparent [1969]
- BDS 5032 – Bubble Gum Music Is the Naked Truth – Various [1969]
- BDS 5033 – Elephants Memory – Elephants Memory [1969]
- BDS 5034 – Brooklyn Bridge – Brooklyn Bridge [1969]
- BDS 5035 – Yesterdays Folks – U.S. 69 [1969]
- BDS 5036 – Indian Giver – 1910 Fruitgum Co. [1969]
- BDS 5037 – Mercy – Ohio Express [1969]
- BDS 5038 – Songs From Midnight Cowboy – Elephant's Memory [1969]
- BDS 5039 – Buddah's 360 Dial–A–Hit – Various [1969]
- BDS 5040 – A Salute to Dwight D. Eisenhower – Documentary [9/69]
- BDS 5041 – Melanie – Melanie [1969]
- BDS 5042 – The Second Brooklyn Bridge – Brooklyn Bridge [1969]
- BDS 5043 – Hard Ride – 1910 Fruitgum Co. [1969]
- BDSP 5044 – Strike–Confrontation At Harvard 1969 – Various [1969]
- BDS 5045 – Journey to the Moon – Jay Genesis [1969]
- BDS 5046 – When I Die – Motherlode [1969]
- BDS 5047 –
- BDS 5048 –
- BDS 5049 – Early in the Morning – Kole and Param
- BDS 5050 – Bengali Bauls At Big Pink – Bengali Bauls [11/70]
- BDS 5051 – Street Man – Barry Goldberg [1970]
- BDS 5052 – I'm Gonna Make You Mine – Lou Christie [1969]
- BDS 5053 – Oh What a Night – Dells [11/70]
- BDS 5054 – Peace Is Blowin' in the Wind – Edwin Hawkins Singers [1969]
- BDS 5055 –
- BDS 5056 –
- BDS 5057 – Juiciest Fruitgum – 1910 Fruitgum Co. [1970]
- BDS 5058 – The Very Best of the Ohio Express – Ohio Express [1970]
- BDS 5059 – Both Sides Now – Tokens [1970]
- BDS 5060 – Candles in the Rain – Melanie [1970]
- BDS 5061 – Stairsteps – Stairsteps [1970]
- BDS 5062 – Head – Head [1970]
- BDS 5063 – Safe As Milk – Captain Beefheart & His Magic Band [1970] (reissue of Buddah BDM 1001/BDS 5001)
- BDS 5064 – More Happy Days – Edwin Hawkins Singers [1970]
- BDS 5065 – The Brooklyn Bridge – Brooklyn Bridge [1970]
- BDS 5066 – Leftover Wine – Melanie [1970]
- BDS 5067 – Brand New Day – Dorothy Morrison [1970]
- BDS 5068 – Step By Step By Step – Stairsteps [1970]
- BDS 5069 – Biff Rose – Biff Rose [1970]
- BDS 5070 – Oh Happy Day – Edwin Hawkins Singers [1969]
- BDS 5071 – Anthem – Anthem [1971] Anthem/Queen/You're Not So Mean/Florida/New Day//Misty Morns/Ibis/Child
- BDS 5072 – Where Are We Going – Bobby Bloom [1971]
- BDS 5073 – Paint America Love – Lou Christie Sacco [1971]
- BDS 5074 – My First Album – Melanie [1970]
- BDS 5075 – The Thorn in Mrs. Rose's Side – Biff Rose [1971]
- BDS 5076 – Children of Light – Biff Rose [1971]
- BDS 5077 – Mirror Man – Captain Beefheart & His Magic Band [1971] Tarotplane/Kandy Korn//25th Century Quaker/Mirror Man
- BDS 5078 – Half Live at the Bitter End – Biff Rose [1971]
- BDS 5079 – Stairsteps – Stairsteps [8/71]
- BDS 5080 – Call Me Man! – Jules Blatner Group [1971]
- BDS 5081 – Blast From My Past – Barry Goldberg [1971]
- BDS 5082 – Bert Sommer – Bert Sommer [1971]
- BDS 5083 – Everything's Coming Up Roses – Jack Wild [1971]
- BDS 5084 – Nature's Baby – Lena Horne [1971]
- BDS 5085 – Seeds to the Ground – Airto [1971] Andei/Branches of the Rose Tree/Jive Talking/Moon Dreams/We Love/Wind
- BDS 5086 – Children (Get Together) – Edwin Hawkins Singers [1971]
- BDS 5087 –
- BDS 5088 – I Don't Know Yet – The Country Store Co.
- BDS 5089 – Gotta Get Back To 'Cisco – Gorgoni, Martin & Taylor [1971]
- BDS 5090 – Tomorrow – Bobbi Martin [1971]
- BDS 5091 – The Johnny Maestro Story – Johnny Maestro [1971]
- BDS 5092 – Wilbert Harrison – Wilbert Harrison [1971]
- BDS 5093 – Paul Anka – Paul Anka [1971]
- BDS 5094 – Raymond Lefevre & His Orchestra – Raymond Lefevre & His Orchestra [1971]
- BDS 5095 – Garden in the city – Melanie [1971]
- BDS 5096 – Steve Goodman – Steve Goodman [1971]
- BDS 5097 – Richard Nixon Superstar – David Frye [1971]
- BDS 5098 – Steve Kuhn – Steve Kuhn [1972]
- BDS 5099 – Merry Christmas – Raymond Lefevre Orchestra [1972]
- BDS 5100 – The View From Rowland's Head – Family Dogg [1972]
- BDS 5101 – I'd Like to Teach the World to Sing – Edwin Hawkins Singers [1972]
- BDS 5102 – Swampgas – Swampgas [1972]
- BDS 5103 – Soul Improvisations – Van McCoy [1972]
- BDS 5104 – Sea Dog – Sea Dog [1972]
- BDS 5105 – Ups And Downs – Len Barry [1972]
- BDS 5106 –
- BDS 5107 – The Bridge In Blue – Bridge [1972]
- BDS 5108 – Tapped Out – Motherlode [1972]
- BDS 5109 – Oh Happy Day – Raymond Lefevre [1972]
- BDS 5110 – A Beautiful World – Jack Wild [1972]
- BDS 5111 – Made For Each Other (Soundtrack) – Trade Martin [5/72]
- BDS 5112 – Johnny Tillotson – Johnny Tillotson [1972]
- BDS 5113 – Gorgoni Martin & Taylor – Gorgoni Martin & Taylor [8/72] Yellow label.
- BDS 5114 – Jubilation – Paul Anka
- BDS 5115 – Take Me Away – Risa Potter
- BDS 5116 – Chee Chee & Peppy – Chee Chee & Peppy
- BDS 5117 – Give Me Your Love – Barbara Mason
- BDS 5118 – Gasoline – Chip Taylor
- BDS 5119 – Amazing Spider–Man: From Beyond the Grave! – Various [1972]
- BDS 5120 –
- BDS 5121 – Somebody Else's Troubles – Steve Goodman
- BDS 5122 –
- BDS 5123 – Cigars, Acappella, Candy – Belmonts
- BDS 5124 – Kid Gloves – Kid Gloves
- BDS 5125 – Roger Shriver – Roger Shriver
- BDS 5126 – Let Me Touch You – Trade Martin
- BDS 5127 – A Musical Trip with George Burns – George Burns
- BDS 5128 –
- BDS 5129 – The Black Motion Picture Experience – Cecil Holmes' Soulful Sounds
- BDS 5130 – Michael Wendroff – Michael Wendroff
- BDS 5131 – New World – Edwin Hawkins Singers
- BDS 5132 – Please Love Me ("All the Right Noises" Soundtrack) – Melanie
- BDS 5133–2 – Dick Clark–20 Years Of Rock N' Roll – Various
- BDS 5134 –
- BDS 5135 – Spirit Of Atlanta – Spirit Of Atlanta [1973]
- BDS 5136 – Super Fly T.N.T. – Osibisa
- BDS 5137 – Gordon's War (Soundtrack) – Horace Ott Ducklings)/Hot Wheels (The Chase)/Child Of Tomorrow (Sung By Barbara Mason)
- BDS 5138 – Cycles – Rod McKuen
- BDS 5139 – Music for Soulful Lovers – Cecil Holmes' Soulful Sounds
- BDS 5140 – Lady Love – Barbara Mason
- BDS 5141 – Imagination – Gladys Knight & the Pips
- BDS 5142 – Love from the Sun – Norman Connors
- BDS 5143 –
- BDS 5144–2 – The Blues... A Real Summit Meeting – Various
- BDS 7511 – Electric Blues Chicago Style – Various [1970]

== See also ==
- List of record labels
