= 1910 Fruitgum Company =

American bubblegum pop band

- The 1910 Fruitgum Company performing live at Proctors Theatre Schenectady NY on November 14, 2026

Background information
- Origin: Linden, New Jersey, US
- Genres: Bubblegum; pop rock
- Years active: 1965–1970, 1999–present
- Label: Buddah
- Members: Floyd Marcus; Mick Mansueto; Joe Raguseo; Paul R Doelling; Joe Gillies; Mark Luckasavage
- Past members: Mark Gutkowski; Frank Jeckell; Steve Mortkowitz; Pat Karwan
- Website: www.1910fruitgumcompany.com

The 1910 Fruitgum Company is an American bubblegum pop band of the 1960s. The group's Billboard Hot 100 hits were "Simon Says", "May I Take a Giant Step", "1, 2, 3, Red Light", "Goody Goody Gumdrops", "Indian Giver", "Special Delivery", and "The Train".

== Background ==
Bubblegum pop was marketed to preteens as the evolving genre of rock music was beginning to target older adolescents and adults with darker lyrics and heavier rhythms. The simple structure of the songs and non-political content of bubblegum pop appealed to a younger audience. Many of the songs in the bubblegum pop genre like "1, 2, 3 Red Light" were intended to be singles within the budget of that younger preteen audience. "1, 2, 3 Red Light" became one of the biggest hits of the genre.

== Career ==
The band began as Jeckell and the Hydes in New Jersey in 1966. The original members were Frank Jeckell, Mark Gutkowski, Floyd Marcus, Pat Karwan and Steve Mortkowitz – all from Linden, New Jersey.

During 1967, they were signed to Buddah Records, where they released five LPs under their own name and a variety of singles, as well as appearing on the LP The Kasenetz-Katz Singing Orchestral Circus. Their first hit single, "Simon Says", reached number 4 on the US Billboard Hot 100 chart and peaked at number 2 on the UK Singles Chart.

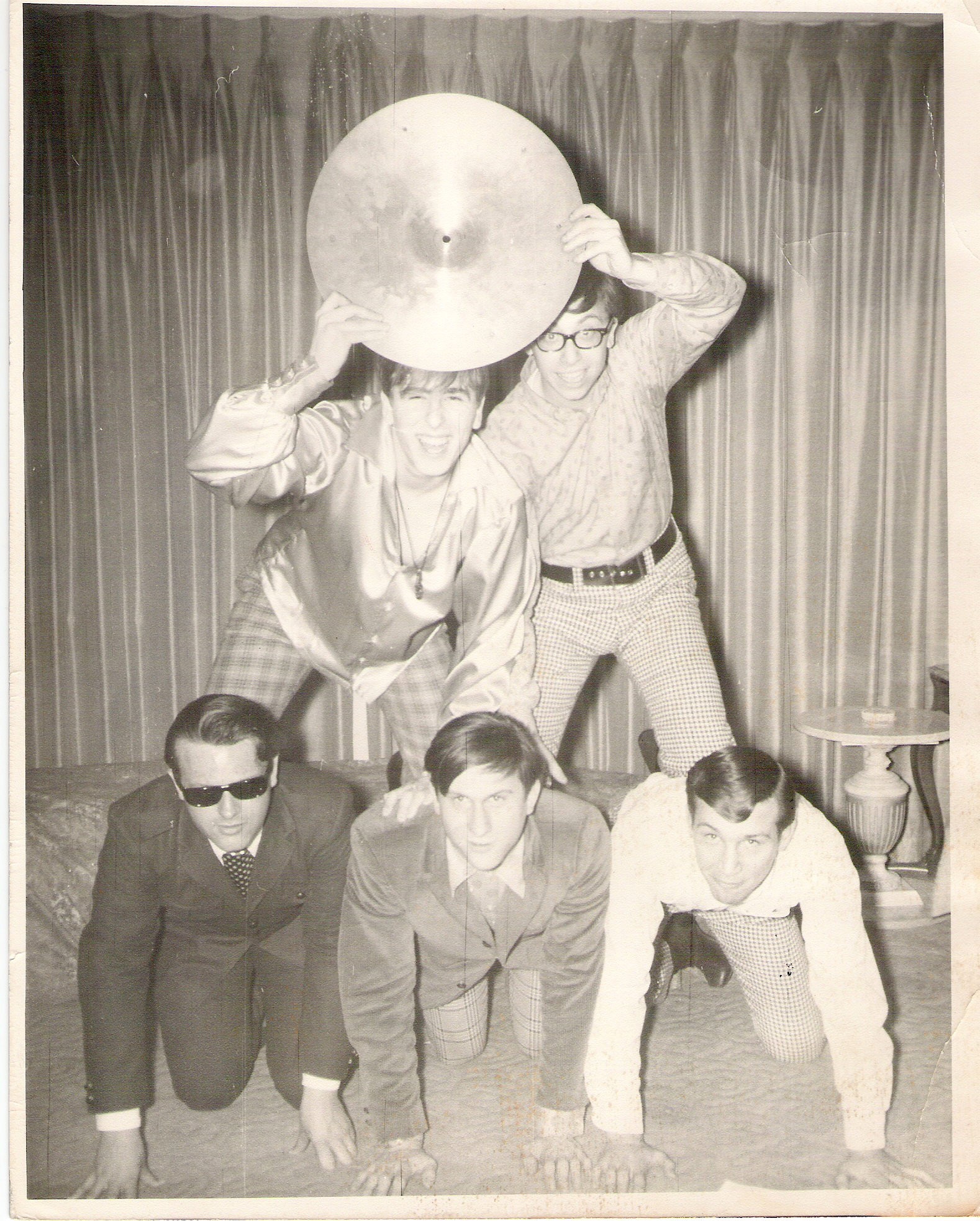
The original five members of the 1910 Fruitgum Company c. 1966; photo taken at the home of Floyd Marcus. Shown on top from the left are Floyd and Steve. On the bottom are Pat, Frank and Mark.

The band started touring, opening for major acts such as the Beach Boys. They also released these other chart hits: "May I Take a Giant Step" (U.S. number 63), "1, 2, 3, Red Light" (U.S. number 5), "Special Delivery" (U.S. number 38), "Goody, Goody Gumdrops" (U.S. number 37), "Indian Giver" (U.S. number 5) and "The Train" (U.S. number 57).

The original group disbanded in 1970.

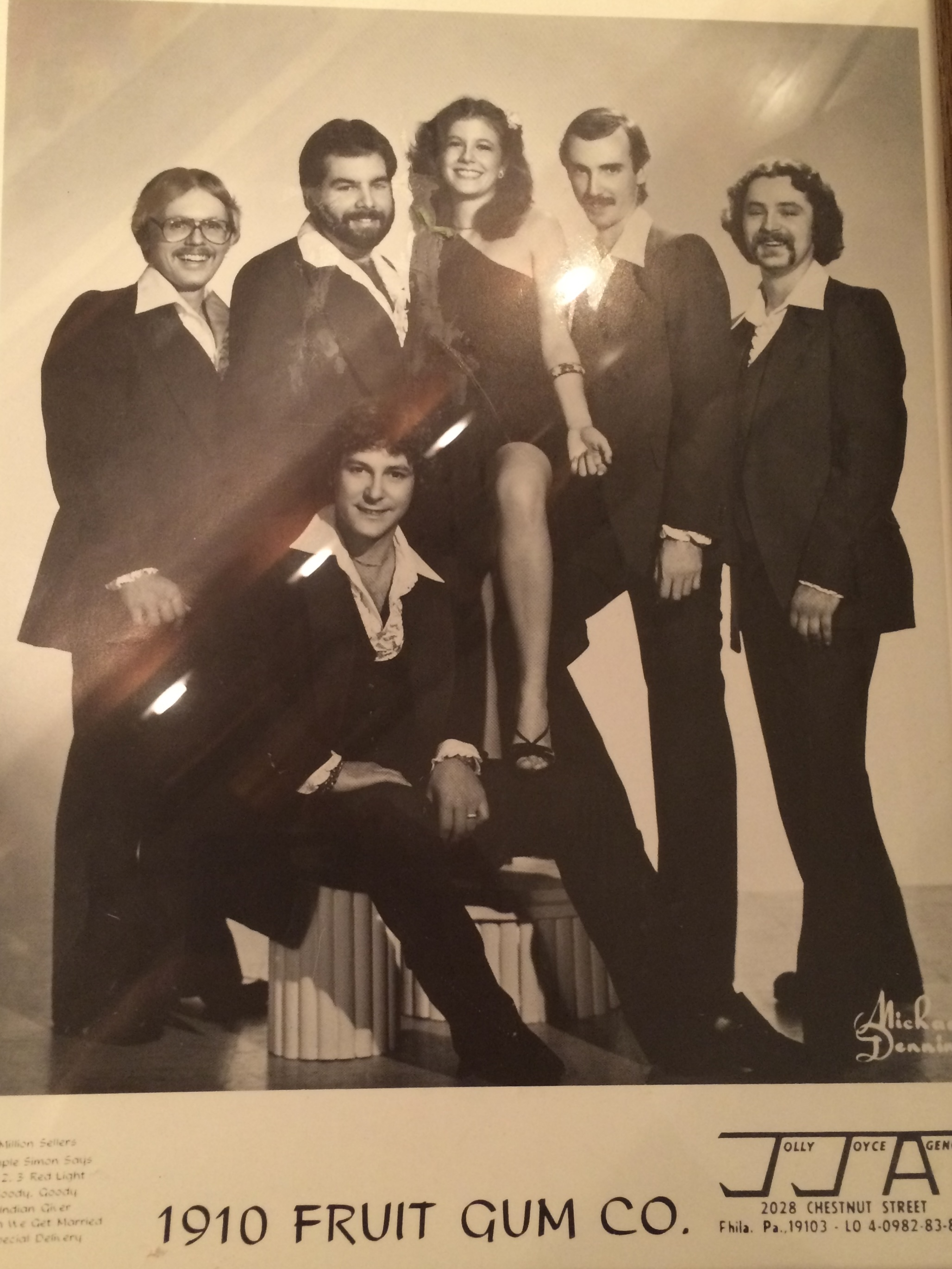
Late 1970s Fruit gum Co.

In 1999, original member Frank Jeckell and Mick Mansueto put the act back together. As of 2019, Fruitgum currently performs its own hits, in addition to other songs from the 1960s.

== Million sellers ==
"Simon Says" sold three and a half million. "1, 2, 3, Red Light" and "Indian Giver" each sold over one million copies. All three were awarded gold discs.

== Band members ==
=== Current lineup ===
- Floyd Marcus (Original Member/Drummer and Lead Vocals)
- Mick Mansueto (Lead Vocals)
- Joe Raguseo (Bass and Lead Vocals)
- Paul R Doelling (Guitar and Lead Vocals)
- Joe Gillies (Drums)
- Mark Luckasavage (Keyboards and Vocals)

=== Former members ===
- Mark Gutkowski (Original Member, Lead Singer on all the hits, and Hammond B3 Organist)
- Pat Karwan (Original Member, Lead Guitarist and Vocals)
- Steve Mortkowitz (Original Member, Bass Player and Vocals)
- Frank Jeckell (Original Member, Guitar and Vocals)
- Jerry Roth (Tenor Sax)
- Bob Brescia (Keyboards, Vocals and music director)
- Thomas "Bart" Bartleson (Drums)
- Mike Edell (Keyboards and Vocals)
- John Korba-Guitar/Vocals
- Ralph Cohen (Douglas) (Trumpet)
- Pat Soriano (Hammond B3 Organist)
- Bruce Shay (Bass and Vocals)
- Rusty Oppenheimer (Drums and Vocals)
- Larry Ripley (Bass, Woodwinds and Vocals)
- Chuck Travis (Guitar and Vocals)
- Richie Gomez (Guitar and Vocals)
- Michael Stoppiello (Guitar and Vocals)
- Philip Thorstenson (Drums and Vocals)
- Chuck Allen (Bass and Vocals)
- Glenn Lewis (Bass and Vocals)
- Keith Crane (Drums)
- Eric Lipper (Keyboards and Vocals)
- John Roginski (Guitar, Keyboards and Vocals)

=== 1980s road band members ===
- Randy Monaco (Lead Vocals)
- Jim Bulkowski (Lead Guitar)
- Russ Hoffmaster (Drums & Vocals)
- Rick Gainor (Bass & Vocals)
- John Siroky (Keyboards)
- Mark Maroni 1982-1985 (Lead Guitar
- Scott Vogt 1982-1985 (Bass Guitar)

== Discography ==
=== Singles ===
Year	Title	Peak chart positions				Record Label	B-side From same album as A-side except where indicated	Album
Year	Title	US	UK	AUS	CAN	Record Label	B-side From same album as A-side except where indicated	Album
1967	"Simon Says"	4	2	2	1	Buddah Records	"Reflections from the Looking Glass" (Non-LP track)	Simon Says
1968	"May I Take a Giant Step (Into Your Heart)"	63	–	42	21	Buddah Records	"(Poor Old) Mr. Jensen"	Simon Says
1968	"1, 2, 3, Red Light"	5	–	8	1	Buddah Records	"Sticky, Sticky" (Non-LP track)	1, 2, 3, Red Light
1968	"Goody Goody Gumdrops"	37	–	29	26	Buddah Records	"Candy Kisses" (Non-LP track)	Goody Goody Gumdrops
1969	"Indian Giver"	5	–	5	1	Buddah Records	"Pow Wow" (Non-LP track)	Indian Giver
1969	"Special Delivery"	38	–	47	17	Buddah Records	"No Good Annie"	Indian Giver
1969	"The Train"	57	–	68	34	Buddah Records	"Eternal Light" (Non-LP track)	Hard Ride
1969	"When We Get Married"	118	–	76	–	Buddah Records	"Baby Bret" (Non-LP track)	Juiciest Fruitgum
1970	"Go Away"	–	–	77	–	Super K Records	"The Track"	Non-LP tracks

=== Albums ===
Year	Album	Billboard 200	Record Label
1968	Simon Says	162	Buddah Records
1968	1, 2, 3, Red Light	163	Buddah Records
1968	Goody Goody Gumdrops	–	Buddah Records
1969	Indian Giver	147	Buddah Records
1969	Hard Ride	–	Buddah Records
1970	Juiciest Fruitgum	–	Buddah Records
1993	Juiciest Hits	–	Buddah Records
1994	Bubblegum Goodies	–	Victor Entertainment
1994	A Golden Classics Edition	–	Collectables Records
2001	The Best of the 1910 Fruitgum Company: Simon Says	–	Buddah Records
2007	Bubblegum Christmas	–	Collectables Records
