= Green Tambourine (album) =

Studio album by the Lemon Pipers
- Released: February 1968
- Recorded: Cleveland Recording Company, Cleveland; Olmstead Recording, New York
- Genres: Bubblegum, psychedelic rock
- Length: 37:39
- Label: Buddah BDM-1009 (mono)/BDS-5009 (stereo)
- Producer: Paul Leka

The Lemon Pipers chronology
Green Tambourine (1968)	Jungle Marmalade (1968)

Professional ratings
Review scores
Source	Rating
AllMusic	4/5 stars

Green Tambourine is the debut studio album by the American rock band the Lemon Pipers. It was released in early 1968 after the band's bubblegum single of the same name had topped the charts in the US.

The album revealed the wide division between the musical tastes of the band and the commercial demands of the band's label, Buddah Records. Five bubblegum tracks written by Brill Building songwriters Paul Leka and Shelley Pinz shared space on the album with folk-rock ("Ask Me If I Care"), blues-rock ("Straglin' Behind", "Fifty Year Void") and psychedelic tracks ("Through With You", running over nine minutes and bearing influences of the Byrds, particularly their John Coltrane-infused song "Eight Miles High"). Leka was the album's credited producer.

"Turn Around Take a Look" and "Green Tambourine" were released as singles in advance of the album. "Rice Is Nice" was released by Buddah as a single after the album's release.

The album's liner notes, written by Buddah General Manager Neil Bogart, described the band as "five very intelligent young men with a solid sound and a real interest in all kinds of music. They perform folk ballads, soul, psychedelic, blues, country and western and write much of their own material."

== Track listing ==
=== Side 1 ===
1. "Rice Is Nice" (Paul Leka, Shelley Pinz) – 2:16
2. "Shoeshine Boy" (Leka, Pinz) – 3:19
3. "Turn Around Take a Look" (Bill Bartlett) – 2:42
4. "Rainbow Tree" (Kenny Laguna, Hy Mizrahi) – 2:16
5. "Ask Me If I Care" (Eric Ehrmann) – 3:03
6. "Straglin' Behind" (no author credit listed on original pressings) – 2:32
7. "Green Tambourine" (Leka, Pinz) – 2:22

=== Side 2 ===
1. "Blueberry Blue" (Leka, Pinz) – 2:19
2. "Shoemaker of Leatherwear Square" (Leka, Pinz) – 2:00
3. "Fifty Year Void" (Albaugh, Bartlett, Browne, Nave, Walmsley) – 5:41
4. "Through with You" (Bartlett) – 9:09 (original pressings incorrectly list this track's duration as 8:31)

== Personnel ==
- Ivan Browne – lead vocals, rhythm guitar
- Bill Bartlett – lead guitar
- R. G. Nave – organ, tambourine, fog horn, toys
- Steve Walmsley – bass
- Bill Albaugh – drums

=== Additional personnel ===
- Irv Spice Strings – string section
- Ken Hamann (incorrectly credited on original album pressings as "Kenny Hammond") – engineer (Cleveland Recording Company)
- Bill Radice – engineer (New York)
