= 1977 in heavy metal music =

This is a timeline documenting the events of heavy metal in the year 1977.

== Bands formed ==
- 707
- 44 Magnum
- Bad Brains
- Barnabas
- Black Death
- Death SS
- Dedringer
- Def Leppard (as Atomic Mass)
- Discharge
- Dire Straits
- Divlje Jagode
- Dokken
- Gordi
- Gravestone
- Great White
- Holocaust
- The Hunt
- Kix
- Manilla Road
- Misfits
- Oz
- Perfect
- The Police
- Prism
- Quartz
- Ram Jam
- Rapid Tears
- Rock Goddess
- Saga
- Samson
- Sarcofagus
- Stress
- Streetheart
- TKO
- Toto
- Törr
- Trance
- Trust
- Vatreni Poljubac
- Zarpa

== Bands disbanded ==
- Buffalo
- James Gang
- Lynyrd Skynyrd
- Montrose
- T. Rex

== Events ==
- October 20 – Six people were killed in a tragic plane crash, including Lynyrd Skynyrd lead vocalist Ronnie Van Zant, guitarist Steve Gaines, and vocalist Cassie Gaines.
- Vocalist Ozzy Osbourne abruptly quit Black Sabbath due to his dissatisfaction with the band's recent albums. He was replaced by Dave Walker.
- Drummer Herman Rarebell joined Scorpions, replacing Rudy Lenners.

== Deaths ==
- April 1 – Joachim "Achim" Kirchhoff, original bassist of Scorpions, died from alcoholism-related complications at the age of 28.
- September 16 – Marc Bolan, founder, vocalist, and multi-instrumentalist of T. Rex, died from injuries sustained in a car accident at the age of 29.
- October 20 – Ronald Wayne "Ronnie" Van Zant, founding member, lyricist and lead vocalist of Lynyrd Skynyrd, died in a plane crash at the age of 29.
- October 20 – Steven Earl "Steve" Gaines, guitarist of Lynyrd Skynyrd, died in a plane crash at the age of 28.
- October 20 – Cassie LaRue Gaines, Steve Gaines' sister and vocalist of Lynyrd Skynyrd, died in a plane crash at the age of 29.

== Albums ==
=== January ===
Day	Artist	Album
7	The Runaways	Queens of Noise
	Sammy Hagar	Sammy Hagar

=== February ===
Day	Artist	Album
11	Jethro Tull	Songs from the Wood
	Angel	On Earth as It Is in Heaven
	Bachman-Turner Overdrive	Freeways

=== March ===
Day	Artist	Album
8	Foreigner	Foreigner
21	AC/DC	Let There Be Rock (Aus/NZ version)
	Mass	Back To The Music

=== April ===
Day	Artist	Album
8	Judas Priest	Sin After Sin
29	Alice Cooper	Lace and Whiskey
29	Krokus	To You All
	Sweet	Off the Record

=== May ===
Day	Artist	Album
13	Ted Nugent	Cat Scratch Fever
	Heart	Little Queen
	Quartz	Quartz
	UFO	Lights Out

=== June ===
Day	Artist	Album
17	Kiss	Love Gun
20	Ram Jam	Ram Jam
	Buffalo	Average Rock 'n' Roller

=== July ===
Day	Artist	Album
7	Rainbow	On Stage (live)
7	Styx	The Grand Illusion
25	Bow Wow	Signal Fire

=== August ===
Day	Artist	Album
12	Motörhead	Motörhead
29	Rush	A Farewell to Kings
	Taste	Knights of Love

=== September ===
Day	Artist	Album
2	Thin Lizzy	Bad Reputation

=== October ===
Day	Artist	Album
7	The Runaways	Waitin' for the Night
10	Sammy Hagar	Musical Chairs
14	Kiss	Alive II
17	Lynyrd Skynyrd	Street Survivors
21	Meat Loaf	Bat Out of Hell
28	Queen	News of the World

=== November ===
Day	Artist	Album
3	Triumph	Rock & Roll Machine
4	Ramones	Rocket to Russia
10	Riot	Rock City
	Blue Öyster Cult	Spectres
	Nazareth	Expect No Mercy
	Uriah Heep	Innocent Victim

=== December ===
Day	Artist	Album
1	Bow Wow	Charge
9	Aerosmith	Draw the Line
	Scorpions	Taken by Force

=== Unknown release date ===
Artist	Album
Goddo	Goddo
Mass	Back To The Music
Moxy	Ridin' High
Thor	Keep the Dogs Away

Preceded by 1976	Heavy Metal Timeline; 1977	Succeeded by 1978
