= List of cover versions of Lead Belly songs =

Huddie William Ledbetter /ˈhjuːdi/ (January 20, 1888 – December 6, 1949) was an American folk and blues musician notable for his strong vocals, virtuosity on the twelve-string guitar, and the folk standards he introduced. He is best known as Lead Belly.

Lead Belly's songs covered a wide range of genres and topics including gospel music; blues about women, liquor, prison life, and racism; and folk songs about cowboys, prison, work, sailors, cattle herding, and dancing. He also wrote songs about people in the news, such as Franklin D. Roosevelt, Adolf Hitler, Jean Harlow, Jack Johnson, the Scottsboro Boys and Howard Hughes.

Lead Belly's work has been widely covered by subsequent musical acts, including:

Song	Artist(s)	Release	Year	Reference
"Midnight Special"	Bob Dylan			
"Midnight Special"	Brian Wilson			
"Midnight Special"	Johnny Rivers	Here We à Go Go Again!	1964	
"Midnight Special"	Delaney Davidson			
"Midnight Special"	Tom Russell			
"Midnight Special"	Lonnie Donegan			
"Midnight Special"	Creedence Clearwater Revival	Willy and the Poor Boys	1969	
"Midnight Special"	Elvis Presley			
"Midnight Special"	ABBA			
"Midnight Special"	Pete Seeger			
"Midnight Special"	Weavers			
"Midnight Special"	Harry Belafonte			
"Midnight Special"	Frank Sinatra			
"Midnight Special"	Nat King Cole			
"Midnight Special"	Animals			
"Midnight Special"	Mischief Brew	Songs From Under the Sink		
"Midnight Special"	Jay Farrar			
"Midnight Special"	Johnny Cash			
"Midnight Special"	Tom Petty			
"Midnight Special"	Dr. John			
"Midnight Special"	Ry Cooder			
"Midnight Special"	Davy Graham			
"Midnight Special"	Maria Muldaur			
"Midnight Special"	Rory Block			
"Midnight Special"	The Grateful Dead			
"Midnight Special"	Gene Autry			
"Midnight Special"	Odetta			
"Midnight Special"	Billy Childish			
"Midnight Special"	Mungo Jerry			
"Midnight Special"	Paul King			
"Midnight Special"	Van Morrison			
"Midnight Special"	Michelle Shocked			
"Cotton Fields"	The Beach Boys	20/20	1969	
"Cotton Fields"	The Beach Boys	country style single	1970	
"Cotton Fields"	Creedence Clearwater Revival	Willy and the Poor Boys	1969	
"Cotton Fields"	Los Apson	Sung in Spanish as "Cuando Era Un Jovencito" - (Atrás De La Raya Album)	1964	
"Cotton Fields"	Elvis Presley			
"Cotton Fields"	ABBA			
"Cotton Fields"	Pete Seeger			
"Cotton Fields"	Weavers			
"Cotton Fields"	Harry Belafonte			
"Cotton Fields"	Frank Sinatra			
"Cotton Fields"	Nat King Cole			
"Cotton Fields"	Animals			
"Cotton Fields"	Jay Farrar			
"Cotton Fields"	Johnny Cash			
"Cotton Fields"	Tom Petty			
"Cotton Fields"	Dr. John			
"Cotton Fields"	Ry Cooder			
"Cotton Fields"	Davy Graham			
"Cotton Fields"	Maria Muldaur			
"Cotton Fields"	Rory Block			
"Cotton Fields"	The Grateful Dead			
"Cotton Fields"	Gene Autry			
"Cotton Fields"	Odetta			
"Cotton Fields"	Billy Childish			
"Cotton Fields"	Mungo Jerry			
"Cotton Fields"	Paul King			
"Cotton Fields"	Van Morrison			
"Cotton Fields"	Michelle Shocked			
"Goodnight, Irene"	Bryan Ferry	Frantic (album)	2002	
"Goodnight, Irene"	Bobby Vee & The Ventures	Bobby Vee Meets the Ventures	1963	
"Goodnight, Irene"	Tom Waits	Orphans	2006	
"Goodnight, Irene"	Half Man Half Biscuit			
"Goodnight, Irene"	Ry Cooder	Chicken Skin Music	1976	
"Goodnight, Irene"	James Booker	Junco Partner	1976	
"Goodnight, Irene"	Dr. John	Goin' Back to New Orleans	1992	
"Goodnight, Irene"	Scott H. Biram			
"Goodnight, Irene"	Ron Sexsmith			
"Goodnight, Irene"	British Sea Power			
"Goodnight, Irene"	Rod Stewart			
"Goodnight, Irene"	Ernest Tubb			
"Goodnight, Irene"	Nick Cave and the Bad Seeds			
"Goodnight, Irene"	Ram Jam			
"Goodnight, Irene"	Little Richard	Little Richard Is Back (And There's a Whole Lotta Shakin’ Goin’ On!)	1964	
"Goodnight, Irene"	Peter Tork			
"Black Betty"	Ram Jam	Ram Jam	1977	
"Black Betty"	Spiderbait	Tonight Alright	2004	
"Black Betty"	Tom Jones	Reloaded: Greatest Hits	2003	
"Black Betty"	Nick Cave and the Bad Seeds	Kicking Against the Pricks	1986	
"Boll Weevil"	White Stripes	Live in Mississippi	2011	
"Boll Weevil"	Fall			
"Boll Weevil"	Hole			
"Boll Weevil"	Smog			
"Boll Weevil"	Old Crow Medicine Show			
"Boll Weevil"	Meat Loaf			
"Boll Weevil"	Ministry			
"Boll Weevil"	Raffi			
"Boll Weevil"	Rasputina			
"Out on the Western Plain"	Rory Gallagher	Against the Grain	1975	
"Out on the Western Plain"	Sensational Alex Harvey Band			
"Out on the Western Plain"	Deer Tick			
"Out on the Western Plain"	Hugh Laurie			
"Out on the Western Plain"	X			
"Out on the Western Plain"	Bill Frisell			
"Out on the Western Plain"	Koerner, Ray & Glover			
"Out on the Western Plain"	Red Hot Chili Peppers			
"Where Did You Sleep Last Night" / "In the Pines"	Nirvana	MTV Unplugged in New York	1994	
"Where Did You Sleep Last Night" / "In the Pines"	Meat Puppets			
"Where Did You Sleep Last Night" / "In the Pines"	Blind Willies			
"Where Did You Sleep Last Night" / "In the Pines"	The Grateful Dead			
"Where Did You Sleep Last Night" / "In the Pines"	Mark Lanegan			
"Where Did You Sleep Last Night" / "In the Pines"	Smog			
"Where Did You Sleep Last Night" / "In the Pines"	WZRD	WZRD	2012	
Keith Richards				
"I Got Stripes" / "On a Monday"	Johnny Cash		1959	
"I Got Stripes" / "On a Monday"	Phil Lee	Cash on Delivery	1999	
"Hangman Jury" (sampled from "Can't You Line 'em")	Aerosmith	Permanent Vacation	1987	
"The Gallis Pole / "Gallows Pole"	Led Zeppelin	Led Zeppelin III	1970	
"Ain’t It A Shame"	Nirvana	With The Lights Out	1989	
"John Hardy"	The Gun Club	Miami	1982	
