= Lucy in the Sky with Diamonds =

1967 song by the Beatles

- Cover of the American sheet music for the song

Song by the Beatles

from the album Sgt. Pepper's Lonely Hearts Club Band
- Released: 26 May 1967
- Recorded: 28 February, 1–2 March 1967
- Studio: EMI, London
- Genre: Psychedelic pop; acid rock; psychedelic rock
- Length: 3:28
- Label: Parlophone
- Songwriter: Lennon–McCartney
- Producer: George Martin

Audio sample
- file; help

"Lucy in the Sky with Diamonds" is a song by the English rock band the Beatles from their 1967 album Sgt. Pepper's Lonely Hearts Club Band. It was written primarily by John Lennon with assistance from Paul McCartney, and credited to the Lennon–McCartney songwriting partnership.

Lennon's son Julian inspired the song with a nursery school drawing that he called "Lucy – in the sky with diamonds". Shortly before the album's release, speculation arose that the first letter of each of the nouns in the title intentionally spelled "LSD", the initialism commonly used for the hallucinogenic drug lysergic acid diethylamide. Lennon repeatedly denied that he had intended it as a drug song, and attributed the song's fantastical imagery to his reading of Lewis Carroll's Alice in Wonderland books.

The Beatles recorded "Lucy in the Sky with Diamonds" in March 1967. Adding to the song's ethereal qualities, the musical arrangement includes a Lowrey organ part heavily treated with studio effects, and a drone provided by an Indian tambura. The song has been recognised as a key work in the psychedelic genre. Among its many cover versions, a 1974 recording by Elton John – with a guest appearance by Lennon – was a number one hit in the US and Canada.

== Background and inspiration ==
Lennon said that his inspiration for the song came when his three-year-old son Julian showed him a nursery school drawing that he called "Lucy – in the Sky with Diamonds", depicting his classmate Lucy Vodden. Julian later recalled: "I don't know why I called it that or why it stood out from all my other drawings, but I obviously had an affection for Lucy at that age. I used to show Dad everything I'd built or painted at school, and this one sparked off the idea." Ringo Starr witnessed the moment and said that Julian first spoke the song's title on returning home from nursery school. Lennon later said: "I thought that's beautiful. I immediately wrote a song about it."

According to Lennon, the lyrics were largely derived from the literary style of Lewis Carroll's novel Alice in Wonderland. Lennon had read and admired Carroll's works, and the title of Julian's drawing reminded him of the "Which Dreamed It?" chapter of Through the Looking Glass, in which Alice floats in a "boat beneath a sunny sky". Lennon recalled in a 1980 interview:

It was Alice in the boat. She is buying an egg and it turns into Humpty-Dumpty. The woman serving in the shop turns into a sheep and the next minute they are rowing in a rowing boat somewhere and I was visualizing that.

Paul McCartney remembered of the song's composition: "We did the whole thing like an Alice in Wonderland idea, being in a boat on the river ... Every so often it broke off and you saw Lucy in the sky with diamonds all over the sky. This Lucy was God, the Big Figure, the White Rabbit." He later recalled helping Lennon finish the song at Lennon's Kenwood home, specifically stating he contributed the "newspaper taxis" and "cellophane flowers" lyrics. Lennon's 1968 interview with Rolling Stone magazine confirmed McCartney's contribution.

Vodden, who lived in Surbiton, Surrey, died on 28 September 2009 of complications of lupus at the age of 46. Julian Lennon had been informed of her illness and renewed their friendship before her death.

== Composition ==
Most of "Lucy in the Sky with Diamonds" is in simple triple metre (3/4 time), but the chorus is in 4/4 time. In the song, the structure modulates between musical keys, using the key of A major for verses, B-flat major for the pre-chorus, and G major for the chorus. It is sung by Lennon over an increasingly complicated underlying arrangement which features a tambura, played by George Harrison; lead electric guitar put through a Leslie speaker, played by Harrison; and a counter melody on Lowrey organ played by McCartney and taped with a special organ stop sounding "not unlike a celeste". Session tapes from the initial 1 March 1967 recording of this song reveal Lennon originally sang the line "Cellophane flowers of yellow and green" as a broken phrase, but McCartney suggested that he sing it more fluidly to improve the song.

== Recording ==
The recording of "Lucy in the Sky with Diamonds" began with rehearsals in Studio 2 at Abbey Road on 28 February 1967. The instrumental backing was finished the following evening. On the first take, track one of the four-track tape contained acoustic guitar and piano, track two McCartney's Lowrey organ, track three Ringo Starr's drums, and track four a guide vocal by Lennon during the verses. Take eight replaced the guide vocal with Harrison's tambura. The four tracks of this take were then mixed together and recorded on the first track of a second four-track tape. On 2 March, Lennon's double-tracked vocals, accompanied by McCartney on the choruses, were recorded to tracks two and three. McCartney's bass and Harrison's lead guitar occupied track four. The lead guitar part varies between sections of the song: over the bridges, Harrison duplicates Lennon's melody and intonation in the style of a sarangi accompanying an Indian khyal vocalist; over the choruses, he plays an ascending riff on his Fender Stratocaster (mirrored by McCartney's bass), with heavy Leslie treatment given to the part. Eleven mono mixes of the song were made at the 2 March session, but they were rejected in favour of the final mono mix created on 3 March. A stereo mix was made on 7 April.

Outtakes from the recording sessions have been officially released. The Beatles' Anthology 2, released in 1996, contained a composite remix, with ingredients from takes six, seven and eight, while the first take of the song was featured on the two-disc and six-disc versions of the 50th-anniversary edition of Sgt. Pepper in 2017. The six-disc collection also included take five and the last of the eleven mono mixes made on 2 March 1967.

== LSD rumours ==
Rumours of the connection between the title of "Lucy in the Sky with Diamonds" and the initialism "LSD" began circulating shortly after the release of the Sgt. Pepper's Lonely Hearts Club Band LP in June 1967. McCartney gave two interviews in June admitting to having taken the drug. Lennon later said he was surprised at the idea the title was a hidden reference to LSD, countering that the song "wasn't about that at all," and it "was purely unconscious that it came out to be LSD. Until someone pointed it out, I never even thought of it. I mean, who would ever bother to look at initials of a title? ... It's not an acid song."

McCartney confirmed Lennon's claim on several occasions. In 1968 he said:

When you write a song and you mean it one way, and someone comes up and says something about it that you didn't think of – you can't deny it. Like "Lucy in the Sky with Diamonds," people came up and said, cunningly, "Right, I get it. L-S-D," and it was when papers were talking about LSD, but we never thought about it.

In a 2004 interview with Uncut magazine, McCartney confirmed it was "pretty obvious" drugs did influence some of the group's compositions at that time, including "Lucy in the Sky with Diamonds", though he tempered this statement by adding, "[I]t's easy to overestimate the influence of drugs on the Beatles' music."

Claims have circulated that the BBC banned the song at the time of its release in 1967 for its alleged references to drugs. Among other sources, the claim has been recited in The Routledge Concise History of Twentieth-Century British Literature. This claim has been disputed by authors Alan Clayson and Spencer Leigh, who wrote in The Walrus Was Ringo: 101 Beatles Myths Debunked that the BBC never officially banned the song, despite the corporation's doubts about the subject matter. The Oxford Handbook of Music Censorship consulted with the BBC's surviving internal correspondence and memos from 1967, and mentioned no ban on any Sgt. Pepper song aside from the one on "A Day in the Life", stating the BBC banned "this one track [A Day in the Life] from the album Sgt. Pepper's Lonely Hearts Club Band". A 2014 documentary film produced and broadcast by BBC television entitled Britain's Most Dangerous Songs: Listen to the Banned also claimed that the BBC never banned the song:

Strangely, on an entire album influenced by the band's mind-expanding experimentation, it was just the final track, "A Day in the Life", that came under the BBC's moral microscope ... After lengthy correspondence with Joseph Lockwood at EMI, the BBC banned the song for what they believed to be a drug reference in just one line ... In fact, another song on Sgt. Pepper [i.e, "Lucy in the Sky with Diamonds"] did slip under the BBC's radar.

The song was played at least once on BBC Radio at the time of the Sgt. Pepper album's release, on the 20 May 1967 broadcast of Where It's At hosted by Kenny Everett and Chris Denning. The song was also played as part of the 1972 BBC Radio documentary The Beatles Story, hosted by Brian Matthew.

== Reception ==
Upon the release of the Sgt. Pepper album, Disc and Music Echo magazine wrote that "Lucy in the Sky with Diamonds" was "easily remembered", that the song spotlighted John Lennon's "peculiarly insinuating" vocals, and that it "jumps along on a crashing clavicord-type sound". Richard Goldstein wrote in a review for The New York Times that the song was "an engaging curio, nothing more". Ernie Santosuosso wrote in a review for The Boston Globe that the song's imagery was "wild".

Discussing the impact of the Sgt. Pepper album, author Nicholas Schaffner cited the song as an example of how the Beatles successfully captured the way "young people were trying to transcend, transform, or escape from straight society" in 1967. He said that just as Harrison's "Within You Without You" represented the exoticism of Hermann Hesse's Siddartha, "Lucy in the Sky with Diamonds" was a "miniature pop version" of Tolkien's The Lord of the Rings in terms of conveying the sense of wonder the book evoked. According to musicologist Walter Everett, the song's lyrics inspired "derivative texts" throughout the late 1960s, namely John Fred & His Playboy Band's "Judy in Disguise (With Glasses)", the Lemon Pipers' "Jelly Jungle (of Orange Marmalade)", Pink Floyd's "Let There Be More Light", and the Scaffold's "Jelly Covered Cloud".

Rolling Stone magazine described "Lucy in the Sky with Diamonds" as "Lennon's lavish daydream". In their respective reviews for AllMusic, Stephen Thomas Erlewine identifies it as "one of the touchstones of British psychedelia", while Richie Unterberger views it as "one of the best songs on the Beatles' famous Sgt. Pepper album, and one of the classic songs of psychedelia as a whole". Unterberger adds: "There are few other songs that so successfully evoke a dream world, in both the sonic textures and words." In his book on the history of ambient music, Mark Prendergast highlights the track as one of the album's "three outstanding cuts", along with "A Day in the Life" and "Within You Without You". He describes it as "incredible" and "a gossamer-like evocation of childlike psychedelia". For BBC Culture, Greg Kot called the song an "acid-rock fantasia" and a high point of the album.

In a review for the BBC Music website, Chris Jones described the track as "nursery rhyme surrealism" that contributed to Sgt. Pepper's "revolutionary ... sonic carpet that enveloped the ears and sent the listener spinning into other realms". Writing for Paste in 2015, Hilary Saunders called the song "a perfectly indulgent introduction to psych-rock". In 2013, Dave Swanson of Ultimate Classic Rock ranked "Lucy in the Sky with Diamonds" fourth on his list of the "Top 10 Beatles Psychedelic Songs", saying that, despite Lennon's insistence about the inspiration for its title, the track is "Three-and-a-half minutes of pure lysergic bliss, full of picturesque and surreal lyrics set to one of the Beatles' most trippy songs."

Harrison later identified "Lucy in the Sky with Diamonds" as one of the few songs he liked from Sgt. Pepper and expressed satisfaction with his Indian music-inspired contributions. For his part, Lennon expressed disappointment with the Beatles' arrangement of the recording, complaining that inadequate time was taken to fully develop his initial idea for the song. He also said he had not sung it very well. "I was so nervous I couldn't sing," he told journalist Ray Connolly, "but I like the lyrics." According to author Ian MacDonald, in a scenario similar to Lennon's disappointment with "Strawberry Fields Forever", Lennon most likely rued the loss of "sentimental gentleness" he had envisaged for the piece, and, overly passive to his songwriting partner's suggestions, allowed the arrangement to become dominated by McCartney's "glittering countermelody". MacDonald views the bridge portions as the "most effective" sections, through their subtle use of harmonised drone and "featherweight bass", and bemoans the reversion to "clodhopping ... three-chord 4/4 rock" over the choruses. He concludes by saying that the track "succeed[s] more as a glamorous production (voice and guitar through the Leslie cabinet; echo and varispeed on everything) than as an integrated song".

== Personnel ==
According to authors Kevin Ryan and Brian Kehew, and John Winn:

The Beatles

- John Lennon – double-tracked lead vocals, maracas, guitar
- Paul McCartney – backing vocals, Lowrey organ, bass
- George Harrison – backing vocals, acoustic guitar, tambura, lead guitar
- Ringo Starr – drums

Additional musician

- George Martin – piano

== Certifications ==
Region	Certification	Certified units/sales
New Zealand (RMNZ)	Gold	15,000^{‡}
United Kingdom (BPI)	Silver	200,000^{‡}
^{‡} Sales+streaming figures based on certification alone.

== Legacy ==
Lennon mentioned "Lucy in the Sky" in the Beatles' song "I Am the Walrus", a song that was admittedly inspired by LSD.

A 3.2-million-year-old, 40% complete fossil skeleton of an Australopithecus afarensis specimen, discovered in 1974 by Donald Johanson, Yves Coppens, Maurice Taieb and Tom Gray, was named "Lucy" because the Beatles song was being played loudly and repeatedly on a tape recorder in the camp. The phrase "Lucy in the sky" became "Lucy in disguise" to the anthropologists, because they initially did not understand the impact of their discovery. The NASA mission Lucy has, in turn, been named after the fossil. It arrived at its first target, asteroid 152830 Dinkinesh, in November 2023.

In 2009 Julian with James Scott Cook and Todd Meagher released "Lucy", a song that is a quasi-follow-up to the Beatles song. The cover of the EP showed four-year-old Julian's original drawing, that now is owned by David Gilmour from Pink Floyd.

Lennon's original handwritten lyrics sold at auction in 2011 for $230,000.

The star BPM 37093 has been nicknamed Lucy, since its core is made of carbon, the same material diamonds are made of.

Lucy Heartfilia, one of the protagonists of manga series Fairy Tail, is named after the song.

== Elton John version ==
"Lucy in the Sky with Diamonds"
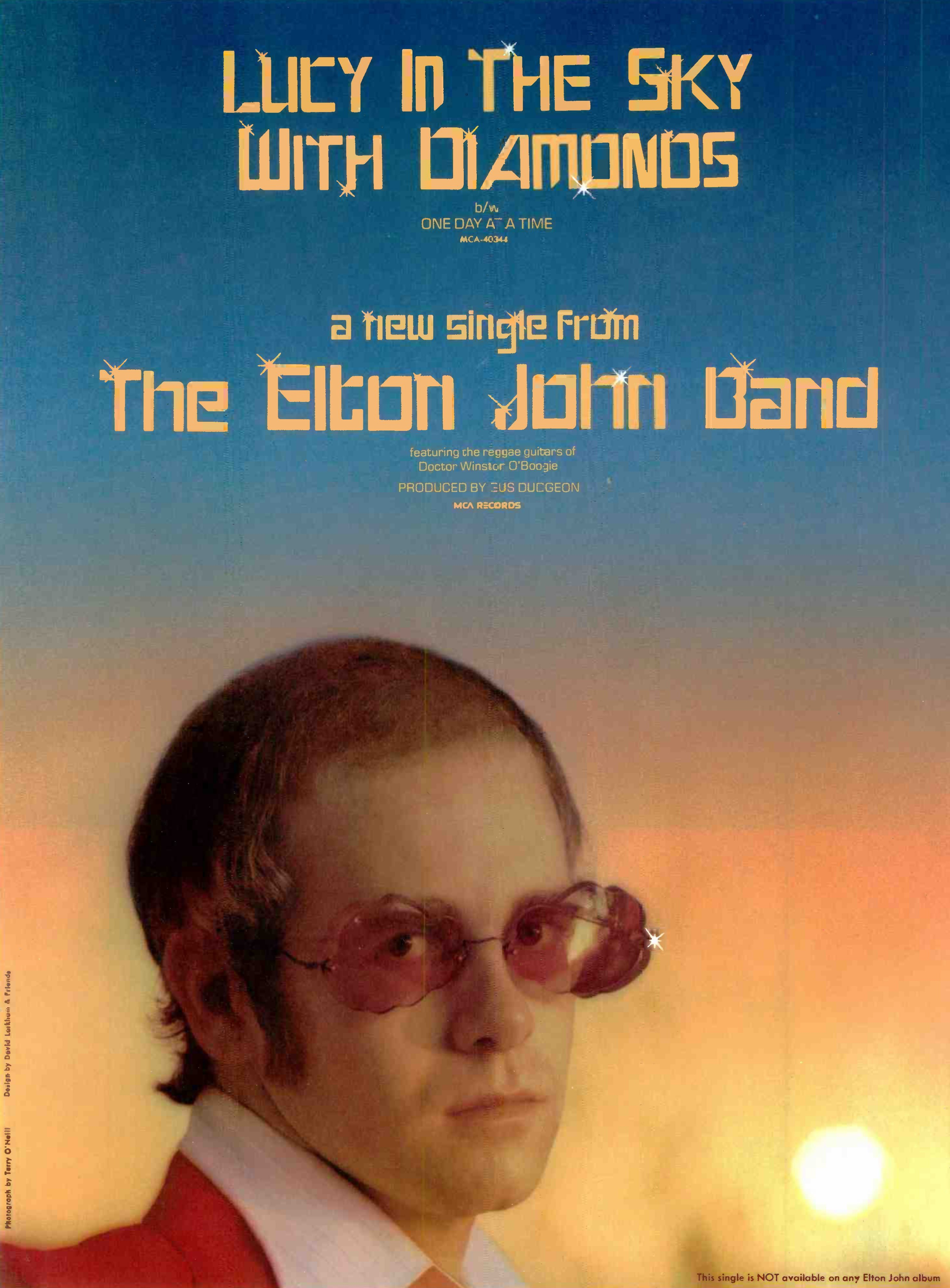
- Cashbox advertisement, 30 November 1974

Single by the Elton John Band
- B-side: "One Day (At a Time)"
- Released: 15 November 1974
- Recorded: Mid-1974
- Studio: Caribou Ranch
- Genre: Psychedelic pop
- Length: 5:58
- Label: MCA; DJM
- Songwriter: Lennon–McCartney
- Producer: Gus Dudgeon

Elton John singles chronology
"The Bitch Is Back" (1974)	"Lucy in the Sky with Diamonds" (1974)	"Philadelphia Freedom" (1975)

The British musician Elton John released a cover version of "Lucy in the Sky with Diamonds" as a single on 15 November 1974. Recorded at the Caribou Ranch, it featured backing vocals and guitar by John Lennon under the pseudonym Dr. Winston O'Boogie (Winston being Lennon's middle name). The single topped the US Billboard pop chart for two weeks in January 1975 as well as the Canadian RPM national singles chart for four weeks spanning January and February. The B-side of the single was also a John Lennon composition, "One Day (At a Time)", from Lennon's 1973 album Mind Games.

This version is longer than the original, featuring an instrumental break after the second chorus, followed by a repetition of the second pre-chorus and the chorus before going into the third verse.

=== Development and release ===
In the US it was certified Gold on 29 January 1975 by the RIAA. During their collaboration, John appeared on Lennon's song "Whatever Gets You Thru the Night". Lennon promised to appear live with John at Madison Square Garden if "Whatever Gets You Thru the Night" became a number-one single. It did, and on Thanksgiving night, 28 November 1974, Lennon kept his promise. They performed "Lucy in the Sky with Diamonds", "Whatever Gets You thru the Night", and "I Saw Her Standing There" (which was written primarily by Paul McCartney). It is one of two songs written by Lennon–McCartney to reach number one in the US by an artist other than the Beatles. The other is "A World Without Love" recorded by Peter and Gordon in 1964.

In introducing "Lucy in the Sky with Diamonds", John said he believed it to be "one of the best songs ever written." The Lennon-sung "I Saw Her Standing There" (credited to the Elton John Band featuring John Lennon) was originally released in 1975 on the B-side of Elton John's "Philadelphia Freedom" single. In 1981, all three live songs were issued on 28 November 1974, an Elton John EP. In 1990, the three songs were made available on the Lennon box set. In 1996, they were also included on the remastered edition of John's Here and There album. John once stated that "'Lucy in the Sky with Diamonds' is a song that I never do in a set at a concert simply because it reminds me too much of John Lennon. This is the same with 'Empty Garden'." It was a part of his standard repertoire from 1974 until 1976, and sporadically until 1998. It also appeared in the 1976 musical documentary All This and World War II as well as the 1995 remaster of Captain Fantastic and the Brown Dirt Cowboy.

=== Personnel ===
- Elton John – lead and backing vocals, piano, Mellotron, harpsichord
- John Lennon (as Dr. Winston O'Boogie) – backing vocals, guitars
- Davey Johnstone – backing vocals, electric guitar, sitar
- Dee Murray – bass guitar, backing vocals
- Nigel Olsson – drums, backing vocals
- Ray Cooper – tambourine, tubular bells, gong, maracas, mark tree, congas

=== Charts ===
==== Weekly charts ====
Chart (1974–1975)	Peak position
Australia (Kent Music Report)	3
Canadian RPM Top Singles	1
New Zealand (Recorded Music NZ)	11
UK Singles (Official Charts)	10
US Billboard Hot 100	1
West Germany (GfK)	31

==== Year-end charts ====
Chart (1975)	Rank
Australia (Kent Music Report)	33
Brazil (Crowley)	51
Canada	7
US Billboard Hot 100	34

=== Certifications ===
Region	Certification	Certified units/sales
United States (RIAA)	Gold	1,000,000^{^}
^{^} Shipments figures based on certification alone.

== The Flaming Lips version ==
"Lucy in the Sky with Diamonds"

Single by The Flaming Lips featuring Miley Cyrus and Moby

from the album With a Little Help from My Fwends
- Released: 18 May 2014
- Studio: 3CG (Tulsa, OK); Pink Floor Studios (Oklahoma City, OK)
- Length: 5:47
- Label: Warner Bros.
- Songwriter: Lennon-McCartney

The Flaming Lips singles chronology
"Love the World You Find" (2007)	"Lucy in the Sky with Diamonds" (2014)	"We a Famly" (2017)

Miley Cyrus singles chronology
"Adore You" (2013)	"Lucy in the Sky with Diamonds" (2014)	"Malibu" (2017)

Moby singles chronology
"A Case for Shame" (2013)	"Lucy in the Sky with Diamonds" (2014)	"Rio" (2014)

Licensed audio
- "Lucy in the Sky With Diamonds" on YouTube

A cover version by the Flaming Lips was included on their album With a Little Help from My Fwends, released on Warner Bros. The song, featuring vocals from Miley Cyrus and Moby, was released as official single on 18 May 2014. All proceeds from record sales go to the Bella Foundation, an organisation in Oklahoma City that helps provide veterinary care to needy pet owners.
