= 1978 in heavy metal music =

This is a timeline documenting the events of heavy metal in the year 1978.

== Bands formed ==
- Amebix
- Ampage
- Anvil (as Lips)
- Blind Illusion
- Bodine
- Cockney Rejects
- E.F. Band
- Earthshaker
- Electric Sun
- Exciter
- Fist
- Fortune
- Gamma
- Gillan
- Girlschool
- Grand Prix
- Hades
- Leño
- London
- Mama's Boys
- Mike Reno
- Messiah Prophet
- Mystery Blue
- New England
- Nightwing
- Pagan Altar
- Pendragon
- Plasmatics
- Riblja Čorba
- Savage
- Survivor
- Trespass
- The Exploited
- Tommy Tutone
- The Next Band
- Tygers of Pan Tang
- Vanexa
- Venom
- Whitesnake
- Wild Horses
- Wrathchild America

== Bands disbanded ==
- Ian Gillan Band
- Lone Star
- Ram Jam
- Sex Pistols

== Events ==
- Vocalist Ozzy Osbourne had a change of heart and returned to Black Sabbath after leaving abruptly the year before.
- Gary Moore embarked on his third and final stint as Thin Lizzy's guitarist, replacing Brian Robertson.
- Paul Di'Anno took over as Iron Maiden's vocalist, succeeding Dennis Wilcock.
- Original Def Leppard drummer Tony Kenning departed the band, making way for Rick Allen, who, at just 15 years old, became their permanent drummer.
- Uli Jon Roth parted ways with Scorpions due to creative differences, leading to Matthias Jabs joining as his replacement.
- Guitarist Michael Shenker left UFO and rejoined Scorpions.

== Deaths ==
- January 23 – Terry Alan Kath, founder and guitarist of Chicago, died from an unintentional self-inflicted gunshot wound to the head at the age of 31.
- September 7 – Keith John Moon, founding member and drummer of The Who, died from an overdose of clomethiazole at the age of 32.

== Albums ==
=== February ===
Day	Artist	Album
10	Judas Priest	Stained Class
10	Van Halen	Van Halen
17	Budgie	Impeckable
	Bachman-Turner Overdrive	Street Action

=== March ===
Day	Artist	Album
2	Quiet Riot	Quiet Riot

=== April ===
Day	Artist	Album
10	Jethro Tull	Heavy Horses
14	Rainbow	Long Live Rock 'n' Roll

=== May ===
Day	Artist	Album
5	AC/DC	Powerage

=== June ===
Day	Artist	Album
2	Thin Lizzy	Live and Dangerous
2	Whitesnake	Snakebite (EP)
10	Foreigner	Double Vision
23	UFO	Obsession
	Yesterday and Today	Struck Down

=== August ===
Day	Artist	Album
15	Boston	Don't Look Back
15	Scorpions	Tokyo Tapes (live album)
18	The Who	Who Are You
	Magnum	Kingdom of Madness

=== September ===
Day	Artist	Album
1	Molly Hatchet	Molly Hatchet
13	Blue Öyster Cult	Some Enchanted Evening
18	Ace Frehley	Ace Frehley
18	Gene Simmons	Gene Simmons
18	Paul Stanley	Paul Stanley
18	Peter Criss	Peter Criss
22	Jethro Tull	Bursting Out
22	Golden Earring	Grab It for a Second
29	Black Sabbath	Never Say Die!
	Styx	Pieces of Eight
	Uriah Heep	Fallen Angel
	Gillan	Gilllan (Japan only)

=== October ===
Day	Artist	Album
6	Wishbone Ash	No Smoke Without Fire
13	AC/DC	If You Want Blood You've Got It
24	Rush	Hemispheres
30	Krokus	Pain Killer
	Whitesnake	Trouble

=== November ===
Day	Artist	Album
3	Judas Priest	Killing Machine
10	Queen	Jazz
17	Alice Cooper	From the Inside
	Heavy Load	Full Speed at High Level
	Rose Tattoo	Rose Tattoo

=== December ===
Day	Artist	Album
2	Quiet Riot	Quiet Riot II
20	Bow Wow	Guarantee

=== Unknown release date ===
Artist	Album
Lucifer's Friend	Good Time Warrior
Ram Jam	Portrait of the Artist as a Young Ram
Mass	Rock n' Roll Power in the 25th Hour

Preceded by 1977	Heavy Metal Timeline; 1978	Succeeded by 1979
