= Steam (band) =

American pop-rock music band

- Origin: New York City
- Genres: Pop, psychedelic pop, pop rock
- Years active: 1969–1970
- Labels: Fontana, Mercury
- Past members: Gary DeCarlo (aka Garrett Scott); Dale Frashuer; Paul Leka

Steam was an American pop rock music group, best known for their 1969 number one hit single, "Na Na Hey Hey Kiss Him Goodbye". The song was written and recorded by studio musicians Gary DeCarlo (aka Garrett Scott), Dale Frashuer, and producer/writer Paul Leka at Mercury Records studios in New York City. The single was attributed to the band Steam, although at the time there was actually no band with that name. Leka and the studio group also recorded the first album of the band from which four other songs were released as singles in 1970.

== History ==
=== Background ===
In the early 1960s, Frashuer and DeCarlo (born Gary Richard DeCarlo in Bridgeport, Connecticut, on June 5, 1942) were members of a doo-wop group from Bridgeport, Connecticut, variously known as the Glenwoods, the Citations, and the Chateaus, for which Leka played piano. The group separated but kept in contact. Leka became a songwriter with Circle Five Productions and in 1967, he wrote and produced the Lemon Pipers' "Green Tambourine" and other Pipers songs with Shelley Pinz.

=== Steam ===
In 1969, Leka was working at Mercury Records and convinced the label's A&R to record DeCarlo. With Leka producing, DeCarlo (under the professional name Garrett Scott) recorded four singles, all of which Bob Reno, the label's head, thought would do well issued as an A-side. DeCarlo's first single was to be "Workin' On a Groovy Thing", but it was beaten by the 5th Dimension version released a week earlier. Then the company and Leka decided on "Sweet Laura Lee" as the next single and a B-side was needed. DeCarlo and Leka were asked to cut a B-side along with Frashuer. The trio chose to use a previously unrecorded song from their Chateaus days, which became "Na Na Hey Hey Kiss Him Goodbye".

To the musicians' surprise, Reno decided that "Na Na Hey Hey Kiss Him Goodbye" should be an A-side. Leka thought the song was "an embarrassing record... Not that Gary sang it badly. But compared to his four songs, it was an insult." To avoid a clash with DeCarlo's planned solo career, Mercury issued the single on its Fontana subsidiary under the name "Steam". Leka said the name was conceived after he saw steam rising from a manhole cover in the street outside the recording studio.

Released late in 1969, "Na Na Hey Hey Kiss Him Goodbye" reached number one in the United States for two weeks in December 1969. The song was also a Top 10 hit in the UK and Canada.

Leka hastily put together a touring group to support the hit single, none of whose members had actually played on the recording. The touring group consisted of: Bill Steer (vocals), Jay Babina and Tom Zuke (guitars), Mike Daniels (bass), Hank Schorz (keyboard), and Ray Corriea (drums). Leka, DeCarlo, and Frashuer did not take part in the touring group, although the three were credited as songwriters for Steam's self-titled album. The second single from the album, "I've Gotta Make You Love Me", reached number 46 in the U.S. on Billboard and 44 in Canada in February 1970.

Steam has also been a live touring band for 3 decades and under several reincarnations dating back to 1970 until its demise in 2006. Some of the touring members were, Tommy Scott Freda on vocals (1970 – 1996) and bass, Paul Freda on guitar (1970 – 1996), Alan Tebaldi on drums (1997 to 2006), Bruce Herring on percussion (1978), Howie Rose on bass (1997), Greg Bravo on vocals (1997 - 2006, and Bill Pascali on vocals and keyboards (1970s, 1980s, and 1990s).

=== Later years ===
Frashuer stepped out of the public eye. He died in 1998 at age 59. Leka became a successful songwriter and producer before his death in 2011. DeCarlo, whose solo career as Garrett Scott did not achieve chart success, left the music industry until making a comeback in 2014, performing at oldies shows.

By the beginning of the 21st century, sales of "Na Na Hey Hey Kiss Him Goodbye" had exceeded 6.5 million records. In 1977, Nancy Faust, the organist for the Chicago White Sox began playing the song to taunt the visiting team. Since then it has been used across the worlds of sport (particularly in relation to player ejections and strutting post-victory celebrations) and politics (at rallies to mock political opponents).

In 2014, DeCarlo released the album Long Time Comin', which included a new version of his hit, 23 days after his 75th birthday. He died on June 28, 2017, of lung cancer.

== Musicians ==
Key musicians on the record, "Na Na Hey Hey Kiss Him Goodbye"

- Paul Leka: Producer, co-writer, keyboards (died 2011)
- Dale Frashuer: co-writer (died 1998)
- Gary DeCarlo: (as "Garrett Scott") co-writer, lead vocalist and percussion (died 2017)

Touring musicians who performed as “Steam”:

- Bill Steer: vocals
- Jay Babina: guitar
- Tom Zuke: guitar
- Mike Daniels: bass
- Hank Schorz: keyboard
- Ray Correia: drums
- Tommy Scott Freda: Vocals
- Paul Freda: Guitar
- Alan Tebaldi: Drums
- Bill Pascali: Vocals / Keyboards

== Discography ==
=== Album ===
Year	Album	Label	Peak chart positions	
Year	Album	Label	US	CAN
1970	Steam	Mercury SR 61254	84	67

=== Singles ===
Year	Single	Peak chart positions			
Year	Single	US	US R&B	CAN	UK
1969	"Na Na Hey Hey Kiss Him Goodbye"	1	20	6	9
1970	"I've Gotta Make You Love Me"	46	—	44	—
1970	"What I'm Saying Is True"	—	—	—	—
1970	"Don't Stop Lovin' Me"	—	—	—	—
1970	"Love And Affection"	—	—	—	—
"—" denotes releases that did not chart or were not released in that territory.

== See also ==
- List of one-hit wonders on the UK Singles Chart
- List of one-hit wonders in the United States
