= 1979 in heavy metal music =

This is a timeline documenting the events of heavy metal in the year 1979.

== Bands formed ==
- 220 Volt
- A II Z
- Atomkraft
- Axe
- Boss
- Chorny Kofe
- Cloven Hoof
- Crimson Glory
- Deep Machine
- Demon
- Europe
- Exodus
- Faith No More (as Sharp Young Men)
- Fallout
- Fishbone
- Girl
- Grim Reaper
- Hanoi Rocks
- Headpins
- Hollow Ground
- Icon
- Jaguar
- The Joe Perry Project
- Kat
- Killer
- Killing Joke
- Loverboy
- Nightmare
- Night Ranger
- Persian Risk
- Picture
- Pomaranča
- The Revoulations
- Saint Vitus
- Salem
- Satan
- Savatage (as Avatar)
- Michael Schenker Group
- Shark Island
- Sheriff
- Spinal Tap (as actual)
- Sweet Savage
- Tokyo Blade
- Trouble
- TSA
- T.T. Quick
- V8
- Vicious Rumors
- Witchfinder General

== Bands disbanded ==
- Emerson, Lake & Palmer
- The Runaways

== Events ==
- In the May issue of Sounds magazine, music journalist Geoff Barton wrote about the emerging scene at the Bandwagon Rock Club in Kingsbury, North London. It was in this article that the term "New Wave of British Heavy Metal" was first introduced, coined by Sounds editor Alan Lewis.
- Black Sabbath parted ways with lead singer Ozzy Osbourne due to his persistent drug abuse issues. He was replaced by Ronnie James Dio.
- Tensions within Aerosmith reached a boiling point when lead singer Steven Tyler and guitarist Joe Perry engaged in a heated confrontation after a show in Cleveland, leading Perry to depart from the band.
- Dennis Stratton joined Iron Maiden as the second guitarist, while Clive Burr took over drumming duties, replacing Doug Sampson.
- Guitarist Michael Schenker departed from Scorpions, and Matthias Jabs was brought in as his permanent replacement.

== Deaths ==
- February 2 – John Simon Ritchie, better known by his stage name Sid Vicious, former bassist of Sex Pistols, died from a drug overdose at the age of 21.
- March 22 – Clayborn Pinkins, founding member and bassist of Black Death, was murdered by gunshot at the age of 25.
- June 21 – Angus William MacLise, original drummer of The Velvet Underground, died from hypoglycemia and pulmonary tuberculosis at the age of 41.

== Albums ==
=== January ===
Day	Artist	Album
16	Accept	Accept
	Def Leppard	The Def Leppard E.P.
	Nazareth	No Mean City
	UFO	Strangers in the Night (live album)

=== February ===
Day	Artist	Album
28	Judas Priest	Hell Bent For Leather (US)
	Scorpions	Lovedrive
	Bachman-Turner Overdrive	Rock n' Roll Nights

=== March ===
Day	Artist	Album
7	Blackfoot	Strikes
16	Motörhead	Overkill
23	Van Halen	Van Halen II
	Triumph	Just a Game

=== April ===
Day	Artist	Album
13	Thin Lizzy	Black Rose: A Rock Legend

=== May ===
Day	Artist	Album
	Saxon	Saxon
	Trust	Trust

=== June ===
Day	Artist	Album
19	Blue Öyster Cult	Mirrors
22	Queen	Live Killers (live album)
	Samson	Survivors

=== July ===
Day	Artist	Album
10	The Kinks	Low Budget
27	AC/DC	Highway to Hell
	Gamma	Gamma 1
	Golden Earring	No Promises...No Debts

=== August ===
Day	Artist	Album
3	Rainbow	Down to Earth
22	Led Zeppelin	In Through the Out Door

=== September ===
Day	Artist	Album
11	Foreigner	Head Games
14	Jethro Tull	Stormwatch
21	Whitesnake	Lovehunter
21	Judas Priest	Unleashed in the East (live album)
	Molly Hatchet	Flirtin' with Disaster
	Sammy Hagar	Street Machine

=== October ===
Day	Artist	Album
1	Slade	Return to Base
12	Motörhead	Bomber
12	Gillan	Mr. Universe
	Magnum	Magnum II

=== November ===
Day	Artist	Album
2	Motörhead	On Parole
9	Iron Maiden	The Soundhouse Tapes (EP)
16	Aerosmith	Night in the Ruts
	The Hand of Doom	Poisonoise

=== Unknown release date ===
Artist	Album
Gravestone	Doomsday
Legend	Fröm the Fjörds
Mass	Slaughter House
Silvertrain	Which Platform Please?
TKO	Let It Roll

Preceded by 1978	Heavy Metal Timeline; 1979	Succeeded by 1980
