= The Very Best of Ram Jam =

Greatest hits album by Ram Jam
- Released: 1990
- Recorded: 1977–1978
- Genre: Rock, hard rock
- Label: Epic

Ram Jam chronology
Portrait of the Artist as a Young Ram (1978)	The Very Best of Ram Jam (1990)	Golden Classics (1996)

The Very Best of Ram Jam is a compilation on compact disc of all the tracks from the two LP records by the American rock band Ram Jam.

The album fully compiles the band's two studio albums, Ram Jam and Portrait of the Artist as a Young Ram. The order of tracks from the latter is slightly altered.

Professional ratings
Review scores
Source	Rating
AllMusic	4/5 stars

== Track listing ==
No.	Title	Writer(s)	Length
1.	"Black Betty"	Ledbetter (arr. Bartlett)	3:57
2.	"Let It All Out"	Barlett	4:00
3.	"Keep Your Hands on the Wheel"	Millius; Graves	3:35
4.	"Right on the Money"	Barlett	3:11
5.	"All for the Love of Rock 'n' Roll"	Salen; Butani; Tuff Darts	3:11
6.	"404"	Kenny	3:44
7.	"High Steppin'"	Barlett	3:40
8.	"Overloaded"	LaPallo; Haberman	2:56
9.	"Hey Boogie Woman"	Bartlett	3:10
10.	"Too Bad on Your Birthday"	Resnick; Karp	3:10
11.	"The Kid Next Door"	Strange; Love	3:24
12.	"Turnpike"	Goldman; Santoro	5:42
13.	"Wanna Find Love"	Goldman; Santoro	3:44
14.	"Just Like Me"	Goldman; Santoro	4:14
15.	"Hurricane Ride"	Goldman; Santoro	4:04
16.	"Saturday Night"	Goldman; Santoro	3:33
17.	"Runway Runaway"	Goldman; Santoro	4:49
18.	"Please, Please, Please (Please Me)"	Goldman	2:58
19.	"Gone Wild"	Strange; Love	3:22
20.	"Pretty Poison"	Strange; Love	4:31
