= Myke Scavone =

Musical artist (born 1949)

- Born: February 4, 1949 (age 77)
- Origin: North Plainfield, New Jersey, United States
- Genres: Blues rock; garage rock; rock; hard rock
- Instruments: Vocals; harmonica; drums; percussion
- Years active: 1964–present

Myke Rocco Scavone (born February 4, 1949) is an American harmonica player and vocalist best known for his work with the bands The Doughboys, Ram Jam and The Yardbirds.

== Early life and career ==
Scavone grew up in North Plainfield, New Jersey. He attended North Plainfield High School, graduating as part of the class of 1966, where he would meet the other future members of his first successful band, The Doughboys.

Scavone joined his first band, the Apollos, in December 1964. He then joined The Ascots in 1965 with another member of the Apollos, guitarist Mike Farina. The band toured the United States opening for bands such as The Vagrants (which featured Leslie West on guitar) and The Hassles, which featured Billy Joel. They changed their name to The Doughboys in 1966 and secured a contract with Bell Records after winning a battle of the bands contest. Scavone was dismissed from the Doughboys in early 1968 when they decided to concentrate on instrumental music before disbanding at the end of that year.

Following the disbandment of the Doughboys, Scavone began a career as a session drummer throughout the late 1960s and early 1970s. He was performing on demos for producers Jerry Kasenetz and Jeffry Katz when he joined the newly formed Ram Jam, led by guitarist Bill Bartlett, in 1977.

The band found success with a cover of the Lead Belly song "Black Betty". Scavone performed on both of the band's albums, Ram Jam and Portrait of the Artist as a Young Ram before the band disbanded in 1978. He did not perform on the band's only hit, "Black Betty", as it had been recorded by Bill Bartlett's former band Starstruck and credited to Ram Jam following Starstruck's disbandment.

Following a period of inactivity in music, Scavone joined a reformed version of the Doughboys in 2000 and still performs with them. The reunion was originally intended to be a one-off. It ended up being a full-time reunion and resulted in the recording of six albums, Is It Now? (2007), Act Your Rage (2010), Shakin' Our Souls (2012), Hot Beat Stew (2015), Front Street Rebels (2017), and Running For Covers (2019).

In 2015, Scavone joined The Yardbirds. He was recruited to play harmonica, percussion and backing vocals. He continues to tour with them.
