= Jelly Jungle (of Orange Marmalade) =

Single by The Lemon Pipers

from the album Jungle Marmalade
- B-side: "Shoeshine Boy"
- Released: May 1968
- Genre: Bubblegum pop; psychedelic pop; baroque pop
- Length: 2:12
- Label: Buddah
- Songwriters: Paul Leka; Shelly Pinz
- Producer: Paul Leka

The Lemon Pipers singles chronology
"Rice is Nice" (1968)	"Jelly Jungle (of Orange Marmalade)" (1968)	"Wine and Violet" (1968)

Audio
- "Jelly Jungle (of Orange Marmalade)" on YouTube

"Jelly Jungle (of Orange Marmalade)" is a song written and composed by Paul Leka (who also produced it) and Shelly Pinz. It was the final chart hit by the 1960s Ohio-based rock group The Lemon Pipers.

Released in the spring of 1968, it spent five weeks on the U.S. Billboard Hot 100, peaking at No. 51, and seven weeks on the Cash Box Top 100, peaking at No. 30. It reached No. 26 in Australia and No. 20 in Canada.

The song contains psychedelic imagery, mostly focused on the color orange: marmalade jelly jungle, sunshine boy, rainbow ladder, yellow ball of butter, fluffy parachute clouds, tangerine dreams, pumpkin drum, carrot trumpets, and violins growing like peaches.

== Chart performance ==
Chart (1968)	Peak position
Australia	26
Canada RPM 100	20
US Billboard Hot 100	51
US Cashbox Top 100	30
