= Gravestone (disambiguation) =

A gravestone is a marker, usually stone, that is placed over a grave.

Gravestone or Gravestones can also refer to:

- Gravestone (band), a German heavy metal band
- "Gravestones" (song), a song by Hawthorne Heights from their 2010 album Skeletons
