= Weekend Love =

"Weekend Love" may refer to:

- "Weekend Love", a song by Carly Rae Jepsen from the 2023 album The Loveliest Time
- "Weekend Love", a song by Golden Earring from the 1979 album No Promises...No Debts
- "Weekend Love", a song by Queen Latifah from the 1993 album Black Reign
- "Weekend Love", a song by Spice Girls from the 2000 album Forever
