= Lucy (Julian Lennon and James Scott Cook song) =

Song written and performed by Julian Lennon, James Scott Cook and Todd Meagher

Song by Julian Lennon and James Scott Cook
- Released: 15 December 2009
- Genre: Rock
- Length: 4:40
- Label: theRevolution, RED
- Songwriters: Julian Lennon, James Scott Cook, Todd Meagher
- Producer: Todd Meagher

Julian Lennon singles chronology
| "Photograph Smile" (1998) | "Lucy" (2009) | "Lookin' 4 Luv" (2011) |

"Lucy" is a song written and performed by Julian Lennon, James Scott Cook and Todd Meagher. The song is a quasi-follow-up to The Beatles' "Lucy in the Sky with Diamonds", originally inspired by a drawing by a then four-year-old Lennon given to his father. The drawing was inspired by Lucy Vodden, a child friend of Lennon, and this song is dedicated to her.

== Cover art ==
Lennon and Cook appeared on CBS's The Early Show on 16 December 2009 to debut the song. In the interview with co-anchor Harry Smith, Lennon revealed his original drawing depicting Lucy "got lost. So how it was found or who may have taken it, I have no idea, but it's now been re-found and David Gilmour from Pink Floyd has it and kindly allowed us to use a copy of it for the art work" for "Lucy.""

== Charity ==
Lennon contacted his childhood friend Lucy later in life, and learned she had contracted the auto-immune disease lupus which she eventually died from. A portion of the proceeds from sales of the song and the EP release went to two lupus charities, St. Thomas' Lupus Trust in the United Kingdom and the Lupus Foundation of America.

== Track listing ==
| No. | Title | Writer(s) | Length |
|---|---|---|---|
| 1. | "Lucy" (studio version) | Julian Lennon, James Scott Cook, Todd Meagher | 4:40 |
| 2. | "Sober" | Cook | 3:37 |
| 3. | "Lucy" (acoustic version) | Julian Lennon, James Scott Cook, Todd Meagher | 4:51 |
| 4. | "Beautiful" | Lennon | 4:55 |
| Total length: | | | 18:02 |
