= Portrait of the Artist as a Young Ram =

Studio album by Ram Jam
- Released: 1978 (US)
- Recorded: 1977–1978
- Genre: Hard rock
- Length: 40:21
- Label: Epic (US)
- Producers: Jerry Kasenetz, Jeffry Katz

Ram Jam chronology
Ram Jam (1977)	Portrait of the Artist as a Young Ram (1978)	The Very Best of Ram Jam (1990)

Portrait of the Artist as a Young Ram is the second and final studio album by American rock band Ram Jam, released in 1978. A remastered version was released on CD in 2006 on Rock Candy Records. The title is a play on James Joyce's semi-autobiographical novel A Portrait of the Artist as a Young Man.

== Critical reception ==
Professional ratings
Review scores
Source	Rating
AllMusic	4/5 stars

In 2006, Goldmine wrote that "few people paid much attention to this rip-snorting scorcher at the time, but among ardent hard-rock fans, it's a towering classic, a lost gem."

== Track listing ==
All tracks are written by Steve Goldman and Jimmy Santoro, except where noted.

No.	Title	Length
1.	"Gone Wild" (T.C. Love, Joe Strange)	3:23
2.	"Pretty Poison" (Love, Strange)	4:32
3.	"The Kid Next Door" (Love, Strange)	3:25
4.	"Turnpike"	5:42
5.	"Wanna Find Love"	3:45
6.	"Just Like Me"	4:14
7.	"Hurricane Ride"	4:04
8.	"Saturday Night"	3:34
9.	"Runway Runaway" (Steve Goldman, Love, Jimmy Santoro, Strange)	4:50
10.	"Please, Please, Please (Please Me)" (Goldman)	3:00

== Personnel ==
- Myke Scavone – vocals, percussion
- Jimmy Santoro – lead guitar
- Bill Bartlett – rhythm guitar, vocals
- Howie Blauvelt – bass guitar, vocals
- Peter Charles – drums

=== Production ===
- Producer: Jeffry Katz/Jerry Kasenetz
- Engineer: Barry Magaliff
- Engineer assistant: Steve Goldman
