= Prisoner of the Night =

Studio album by Golden Earring
- Released: September 1980
- Studio: The Golden Earring Workshop, Zoetermeer, Netherlands
- Genre: Hard rock; pop
- Length: 36:48
- Label: Polydor
- Producer: George Kooymans

Golden Earring chronology
No Promises...No Debts (1979)	Prisoner of the Night (1980)	2nd Live (1981)

Singles from Prisoner of the Night
- 1. "Long Blond Animal" Released: 12 September 1980; 2. "No for an Answer" Released: November 1980

Professional ratings
Review scores
Source	Rating
AllMusic	link

Prisoner of the Night is the 15th studio album by Dutch hard rock band Golden Earring, released in 1980. In the US, Spain and South Africa, the album was titled Long Blond Animal. Former band member Robert Jan Stips (1974-75) again returns as a guest musician, playing synthesizer. The first single "Long Blond Animal" became a staple of their live shows, becoming one of the most played songs during their long career.

== Track listing ==
All tracks are written by George Kooymans and Barry Hay, except "Cut 'Em Down to Size" by Kooymans, Hay, Rinus Gerritsen and Cesar Zuiderwijk.

Side A
No.	Title	Length
1.	"Long Blond Animal"	3:36
2.	"No for an Answer"	4:13
3.	"My Town"	3:06
4.	"Prisoner of the Night"	4:50
5.	"I Don't Wanna Be Nobody Else"	4:41
Total length:		20:28

Side B
No.	Title	Length
6.	"Cut 'Em Down to Size"	3:23
7.	"Will & Mercy"	3:36
8.	"Come in Outerspace"	4:24
9.	"Going Crazy Again"	4:59
Total length:		16:23

== Personnel ==
Golden Earring

- Barry Hay – vocals, guitar; lead vocals (1–6, 9)
- George Kooymans – lead guitar, vocals; lead vocals (7, 8)
- Rinus Gerritsen – bass guitar, keyboards
- Cesar Zuiderwijk – drums

Guest musicians

- Robert Jan Stips – synthesizer
- Tony Britnel – tenor saxophone

Production

- George Kooymans – producer, mixing
- John Kriek – engineer, mixing
- Kees Tabak – photography

== Charts ==
Chart (1980)	Peak position
Dutch Albums (Album Top 100)	7
