= Green Tambourine =

- A-side label of the US single

Single by the Lemon Pipers

from the album Green Tambourine
- B-side: "No Help from Me"
- Released: November 1967
- Recorded: 1967
- Studio: Cleveland Recording Company, Cleveland
- Genre: Bubblegum pop; psychedelic pop; psychedelic rock; raga rock
- Length: 2:23
- Label: Buddah
- Songwriters: Paul Leka; Shelley Pinz
- Producer: Paul Leka

The Lemon Pipers singles chronology
| "Turn Around and Take a Look" (1967) | "Green Tambourine" (1967) | "Rice Is Nice" (1968) |

International releases
- Artwork for the Dutch single

Alternative cover
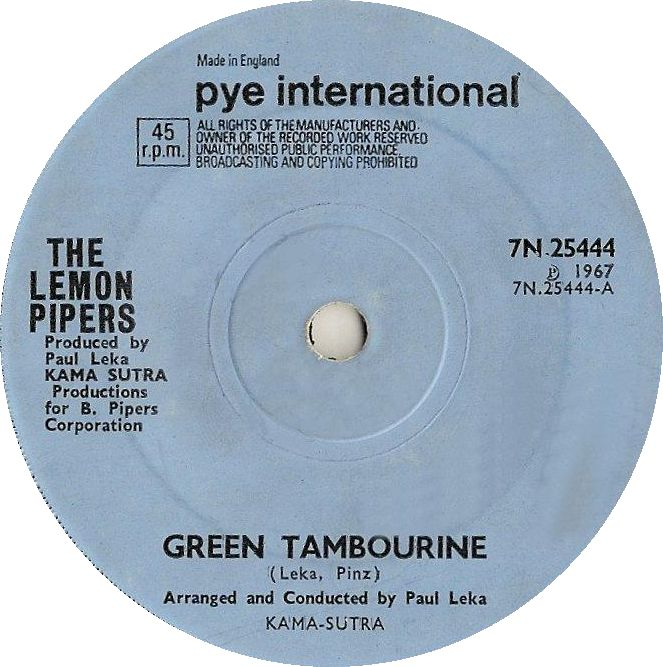
- A-side label of the UK single

Music video
- "Green Tambourine" (1968 television performance) on YouTube

"Green Tambourine" is a song written and composed by Paul Leka (who also produced it) and Shelley Pinz. It was the biggest hit by the 1960s Ohio-based rock group the Lemon Pipers, as well as the title track of their debut album, Green Tambourine. The song was one of the first psychedelic pop chart-toppers and became a gold record.

Released toward the end of 1967, it spent 13 weeks on the U.S. Billboard Hot 100, peaking at No. 1 on February 3, 1968, and sold over a million copies. The record remained on the chart for three months. It was also the first U.S. No. 1 hit for the Buddah label. The Lemon Pipers never repeated this success, though their "Rice Is Nice" and "Jelly Jungle", both also written by Leka and Pinz, made the charts in 1968.

== Song and recording ==
The song's lyricist, Rochelle "Shelley" Pinz (1943–2004) was a writer at the Brill Building, working with Leka. She said:

In early Spring, 1966, while standing in front of the Brill Building I watched a man holding a tambourine begging for money. I wrote a poem about him and called the poem 'Green Tambourine.' I added it to my lyric collection ... Sometimes I wonder what happened to the man in front of the Brill Building, holding a tambourine begging for money. I remember writing the lyric, 'watch the jingle jangle start to shine, reflections of the music that is mine. When you toss a coin you'll hear it sing. Now listen while I play my Green Tambourine' as if it were yesterday..; in the 60s, on the streets between Seventh Avenue and Broadway there was a magic one could only imagine.

The song tells the story of a street musician pleading for someone to give him money. In exchange he offers to play his green tambourine. The song's instrumentation contains the titular tambourine as well as an electric sitar, a frequent signature of the so-called "psychedelic sound". Another hook is the heavy, psychedelic tape echo applied to the word "play" in each chorus and at the end, fading into a drumroll ("Listen while I play play play play play play play my green tambourine"). The echo is noticeably different in the mono and stereo mixes. The mono version also starts fading out slightly earlier than in the stereo version.

The musical arrangement also features sweeping orchestrated strings and the distinctive vibraslap percussion instrument. While the Lemon Pipers played on the record, producer and joint author-composer Leka hired a string section to accompany the band, to add extra depth to the already psychedelic arrangement.

The single's B-side, "No Help from Me," featured lead vocal by keyboardist Bob Nave and did not appear on either of the group's two albums.

=== Charts ===
==== Weekly charts ====
| Chart (1967–1968) | Peak position |
|---|---|
| Australia (Go-Set) | 3 |
| Belgium (Wallonia) | 30 |
| Canada RPM 100 | 3 |
| Germany | 10 |
| Netherlands | 9 |
| New Zealand (Listener) | 3 |
| South Africa (Springbok) | 6 |
| Switzerland (Swiss Hitparade) | 7 |
| UK Record Retailer | 7 |
| US Billboard Hot 100 | 1 |
| US Cash Box Top 100 | 1 |
| US Record World 100 Top Pops | 1 |

==== Year-end charts ====
| Chart (1968) | Rank |
|---|---|
| Canada RPM 100 | 6 |
| US Billboard Hot 100 | 47 |
| US Cash Box Top 100 | 8 |

== Certifications ==
| Region | Certification | Certified units/sales |
|---|---|---|
| United States (RIAA) | Gold | 1,000,000^{^} |
^{^} Shipments figures based on certification alone.

== Personnel ==
- Ivan Browne – lead vocals, rhythm guitar
- Bill Bartlett – lead guitar
- R. G. Nave – organ, tambourine, fog horn, toys
- Steve Walmsley – bass
- Bill Albaugh – drums

=== Additional personnel ===
- Irv Spice Strings – string section
- Ken Hamann (incorrectly credited on original album pressings as "Kenny Hammond") – engineer (Cleveland Recording Company)
- Bill Radice – engineer (New York)
- Uncredited – vibraslap

== Cover versions ==
In 1968, an instrumental version was released by Lawrence Welk and His Orchestra on the album Love Is Blue, and as a single. Welk's version reached No. 27 on Billboard's Easy Listening chart, No. 21 on Record World's "Top Non-Rock" chart, and No. 11 on Record World's chart of "Singles Coming Up". In the same year, Status Quo covered the song on their debut album Picturesque Matchstickable Messages from the Status Quo.

Robert Goulet covered the song for the 2001 film Recess: School's Out, providing the singing voice for the character Mikey, releasing it as a single from the film soundtrack of the same name.

The Peppermint Rainbow, a group signed to Decca records by Paul Leka, covered the song on their debut album Will You Be Staying After Sunday (Decca DL75129) using the identical backing track as the original song but with replaced vocals.

== See also ==
- List of 1960s one-hit wonders in the United States
