= Brill Building (genre) =

Pop genre from New York in the 1960s

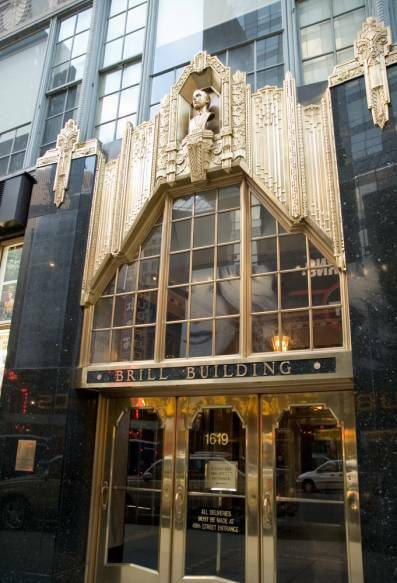
- The main entrance of the Brill Building in 2006
- Stylistic origins: Pop; Tin Pan Alley; rock and roll; doo-wop; rhythm and blues; Latin music
- Cultural origins: Late 1950s – early 1960s, New York City
- Typical instruments: Guitar; strings
- Derivative forms: Soft rock; sunshine pop; bubblegum

Other topics
- Girl group; pop rock; teen idol

Brill Building (also known as Brill Building pop or the Brill Building sound) is a subgenre of pop music that took its name from the Brill Building in New York City, where numerous teams of professional songwriters penned material for girl groups and teen idols during the early 1960s. The term has also become a metonym for the period in which those songwriting teams flourished. In actuality, most hits of the mid-1950s and early 1960s were written elsewhere.

== Overview ==
Neil Sedaka – "Breaking Up Is Hard to Do" (1962)
"Breaking Up Is Hard to Do" is one of the quintessential examples of the Brill Building sound crafted by Neil Sedaka and his contemporaries.

The music conceived at the Brill Building was more sophisticated than other pop styles of the time, combining contemporary sounds with classic Tin Pan Alley songwriting. Productions often featured orchestras and bands with large rhythm and guitar sections, while lyrics focused on idealized romance and adolescent anxieties, only rarely exploring more mature themes.

The genre dominated the American charts in the period between Elvis Presley's Army enlistment in 1958 and the onset of the British Invasion in 1964. It declined thereafter, but demonstrated a continued influence on British and American pop and rock music in subsequent years. The genre introduced the concept of professional songwriters to traditional pop and early rock and roll, and helped to inspire the girl group craze of the era. Other reasons for the style's decline was a tendency among writers and producers to duplicate earlier successes, resulting in many records that sounded the same, as well as the changing nature of society and consumer markets. Many of the genre's composers went on to further success as part of the singer-songwriter movement later in the 1960s and 1970s.

== List of artists ==
1960s artists/songwriters

- Jeff Barry
- Neil Diamond
- Gerry Goffin
- Howard Greenfield
- Ellie Greenwich
- Carole King
- Don Kirshner
- Connie Francis
- Barry Mann
- Shadow Morton
- Fred Neil
- Doc Pomus
- Neil Sedaka
- Cynthia Weil
- Mort Shuman
- Burt Bacharach

Later artists

- Roy Wood

== Bibliography ==
- Auslander, Philip (2006). Performing Glam Rock: Gender and Theatricality in Popular Music. University of Michigan Press. ISBN 0-472-06868-7.
- Cooper, Kim; Smay, David, eds. (2001). Bubblegum Music is the Naked Truth. Feral House. ISBN 978-0-922915-69-9.
- Gulla, Bob, ed. (2007). Icons of R&B and Soul: An Encyclopedia of the Artists Who Revolutionized Rhythm. Greenwood. ISBN 978-0-313-34044-4.
- Hall, Mitchell K. (2014). The Emergence of Rock and Roll: Music and the Rise of American Youth Culture. Routledge. ISBN 978-1-135-05358-1.
- New York Times, The (2011). The New York Times Guide to Essential Knowledge: A Desk Reference for the Curious Mind. St. Martin's Press. ISBN 978-0-312-64302-7.
- Seabrook, John (2015). The Song Machine: Inside the Hit Factory. W. W. Norton. ISBN 978-0-393-24193-8.
