= Rapid Tears =

Canadian heavy metal band

Rapid Tears was a Canadian heavy metal band formed in 1977 in Toronto, Ontario. The members included founding member Michael J. Miller on guitar, Rick Nemes on drums, and Brian Frank on vocals.

== History ==
The first Rapid Tears' single "Operation Airlift/Tomorrow" was released on Guardian Records in 1980. Two Rapid Tears songs, "Discontent Intentions" and "Heart of Predestination", were featured on the compilation album released in 1982 by Chameleon Records. Later, in 1982, they released their debut album, Honestly, on Chameleon Records. The album had two cover variations and gained significant traction in Europe.

In 1984, they released "Cry for Mercy", also on Chameleon Records. This album received international recognition and drew comparisons to the styles of bands like Dio and Scorpions. The band was also featured on City TV's The NewMusic. The band disbanded in 1985.

In 2016, Rapid Tears' albums were re-released by the European record label, Sonic Age Records/Cult Metal Classics. The two Rapid Tears songs "Discontent Intentions" and "Heart of Predestination" were added to the "Cry For Mercy" album upon its re-release by Sonic Age Records that same year.

In 2021, "Headbang" and "Wonderland" were released by the record label RidingEasy/Permanent Records on the compilation album Scrap Metal Vol 1.

== Members ==
- Michael J. Miller
  - Instruments: Guitars, Vocals (backing)
  - Years active: 1977-1985, 1986
- Clayton Bonin
  - Instruments: Guitars, Vocals (backing)
  - Years active: 1978-1985, 1986
- Brian Frank
  - Instruments: Vocals (lead)
  - Years active: 1978-1985, 1986
- Jon Wein
  - Instruments: Bass
  - Years active: 1981-1985, 1986
- Adam Sherban
  - Instruments: Bass
  - Years active: 1979-1981
- Rick Nemes
  - Instruments: Drums
  - Years active: 1977-1985
- Steve Lederman
  - Instruments: Drums
  - Years active: 1985, 1986

== Discography ==
=== Singles ===
- "Operation Airlift / Tomorrow" (1980)
- "Headbang / Wonderland" (1981)

=== Albums ===
- Honestly (1982)
- Cry for Mercy (1984)
