= The Lemon Pipers =

1960s American rock band

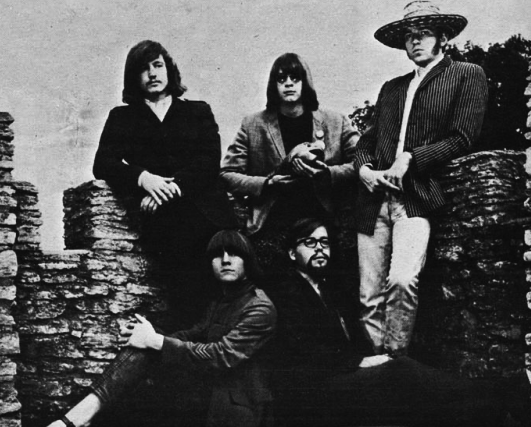
- The Lemon Pipers in 1968. Top, from left: Ivan Browne, Bill Bartlett, Bill Albaugh. Bottom, from left: Steve Walmsley, Robert G. Nave.

Background information
- Origin: Oxford, Ohio, United States
- Genres: Bubble-gum; psychedelia
- Years active: 1966–1969
- Label: Buddah
- Past members: Bill Albaugh; Bill Bartlett; Dale "Ivan" Browne; Robert G. Nave; Bob "Dude" Dudek; Steve Walmsley

The Lemon Pipers were a short-lived 1960s American rock band from Oxford, Ohio, known chiefly for their song "Green Tambourine", which reached number-one in the United States in 1968. The song has been credited as being the first bubblegum pop chart-topper.

== History ==
The band was formed in 1966 by student musicians from Oxford, Ohio, who played the college bars with previous groups that included The Wombats (Nave), Ivan and the Sabres (Browne), and Tony and the Bandits (Bartlett, Albaugh and Dudek). The band played a mixture of blues, hard rock and folk rock, with a few covers from The Byrds and The Who. They gigged regularly in an Oxford bar called The Boar's Head, and Cincinnati underground rock venues, The Mug Club and later The Ludlow Garage, before releasing a single on the Carol Records label, "Quiet Please". The original band existed as a quartet, and then gained notoriety by reaching the finals in the Ohio Battle of the Bands at the Cleveland Public Auditorium in 1967, losing out to the James Gang.

=== Signing a record deal ===
The band recruited Miami University student Browne as frontman, and also engaged Ohio music industry impresario Mark Barger, who steered the Lemon Pipers to Buddah Records, then run by Neil Bogart. The Lemon Pipers, relying in part on advice from Barger, agreed to enter into a recording contract and music publishing deal with Buddah. The group began playing larger auditorium and concert hall venues around the US, including an appearance at Bill Graham's Fillmore West in San Francisco on the same bill with Traffic, Moby Grape and Spirit on March 21, 1968. Buddah's plans for the group focused on bubblegum pop rather than rock music, and the Lemon Pipers joined a stable already containing Ohio Express and the aptly named 1910 Fruitgum Company. Paul Leka was assigned to be their record producer.

=== Number one hit ===
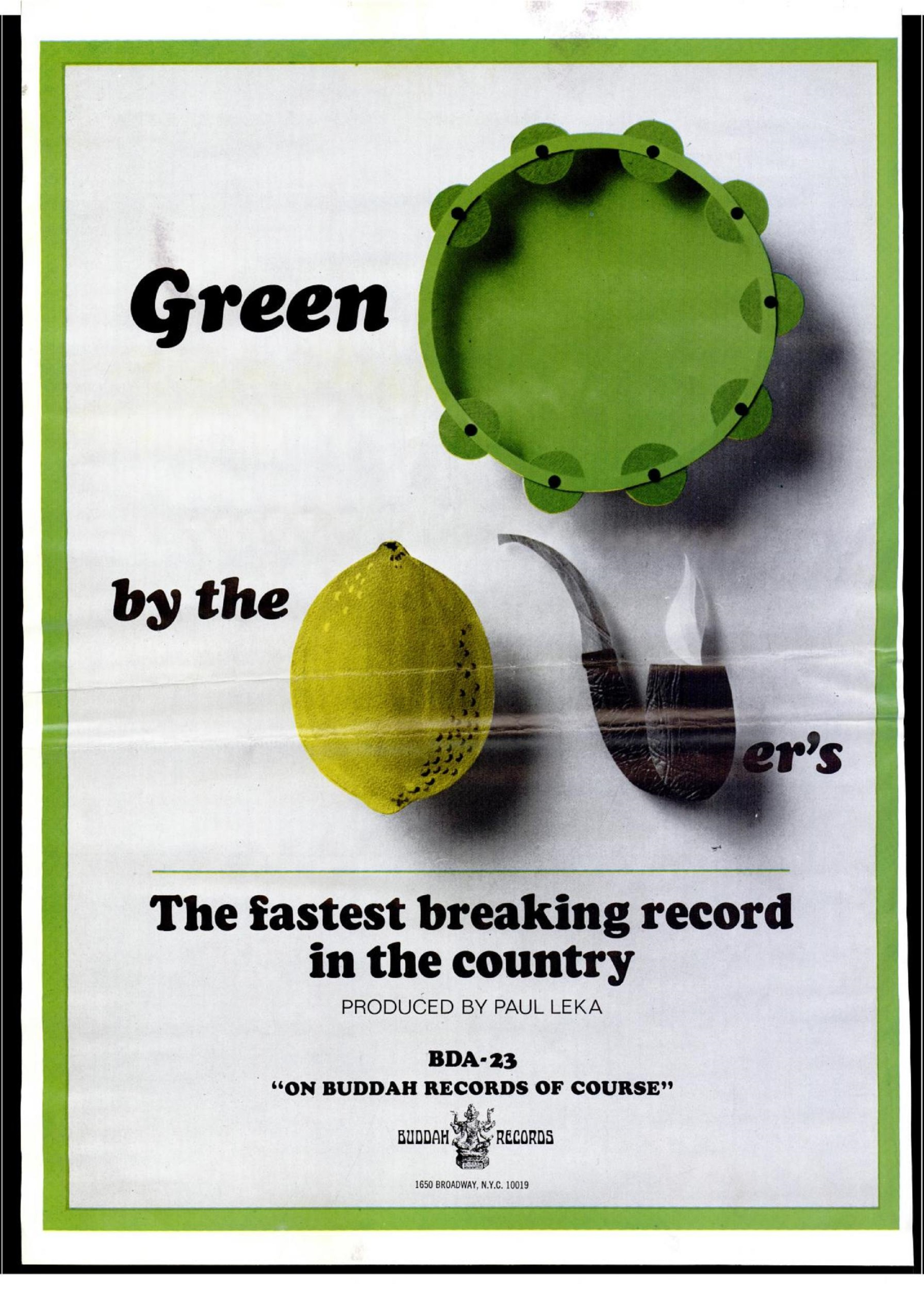
Billboard advertisement, January 6, 1968

The group's debut on Buddah was a Bartlett, composition, "Turn Around and Take a Look". When the song failed to make the charts, the label asked Leka and his songwriting partner, Shelley Pinz, who were working out of a Brill Building office on Broadway, to come up with a song. The pair wrote "Green Tambourine" and the band reluctantly recorded it. The song entered the Billboard Hot 100 at the end of 1967 and reached No. 1 in February 1968 on the Billboard and Cashbox charts. The song peaked at No. 7 in the UK Singles Chart, and was also a hit worldwide. It sold over two million copies, and was awarded a gold disc by the Recording Industry Association of America (R.I.A.A.) in February 1968.

The success of "Green Tambourine" caused the label to put pressure on the group to stay in the same genre, and in March 1968 the band released another Leka/Pinz song, "Rice Is Nice", which peaked at No. 46 on the US Billboard charts, No.42 on the US Cashbox charts and No. 41 in the UK in May. The band had little enthusiasm for either song, however, dubbing them "funny-money music" and recording them only because they knew they would be dropped by Buddah if they refused. "Ordinary Point of View", written by Eric Ehrmann and featuring a Bartlett country solo, was recorded, but rejected by Buddah. Disenchanted with Buddah and the music industry, Ehrmann stopped writing songs and went on to become one of the early contributors to Rolling Stone magazine. As is common with the music associated with the 1960s, a few copyright and royalties issues connected with the previous owner of Buddah Records inherited by current owners of the Kama Sutra music publishing catalog and Lemon Pipers songs remain unresolved.

=== Stereotyped ===
The Lemon Pipers's evolution from 1960s rock music into a gold-record pop group created what Nave has described as "the duality of the Lemon Pipers": "We were a stand-up rock 'n' roll band, and then all of a sudden, we're in a studio, being told how to play and what to play."

The chasm between the label's aspirations and the band's own musical tastes became apparent on the Lemon Pipers's debut album, Green Tambourine. Produced by Leka, the album contained five Leka/Pinz songs, as well as two extended tracks written by the band, "Fifty Year Void" and "Through With You" (the latter, written by Bartlett, bearing influences of The Byrds and, according to the original LP label, running 8:31 in length). "Ask Me If I Care" written by Ehrmann, was also included. Like Lemon Pipers' members Nave and Albaugh, Ehrmann was a member of the Kappa chapter of Delta Kappa Epsilon fraternity. Writing in Bubblegum is the Naked Truth, Gary Pig Gold commented: "It was the Pipers’ way with a tough-pop gem in the under-four-minute category which was most impressive by far: "Rainbow Tree", "Shoeshine Boy" and especially "Blueberry Blue" each sported a taut, musical sophistication worthy of The Move and, dare I say it, even the Magical Mystery Beatles."

The band recorded a second album for Buddah, Jungle Marmalade, which again showed both sides of the band – another Leka/Pinz song, "Jelly Jungle (of Orange Marmalade)", (released as a single and peaking at No. 51 on Billboard and No. 30 on Cashbox in the US), a version of the Carole King/Gerry Goffin penned song "I Was Not Born to Follow," and an 11-minute, 43 second epic, "Dead End Street"/"Half Light".

=== Dissolution ===
The band left the Buddah label in 1969 and later dissolved. Bartlett, Walmsley and Nave formed Starstruck, whose recording of a Lead Belly song, "Black Betty", was reworked by Super K Productions producers Jerry Kasenetz and Jeffry Katz, and released in 1977 under the name of Ram Jam, featuring Bartlett. Browne moved to California to continue playing music, Walmsley played bass around Oxford. Bartlett became despondent and reclusive following the death of his wife Dee Dee. Nave became a jazz disc jockey on WVXU in Cincinnati and played organ occasionally with The Blues Merchants in southwestern Ohio venues.

Drummer Bill Albaugh died on January 20, 1999, at the age of 53.

Keyboardist Bob Nave (born Robert Gordon Nave on November 3, 1944 in Dayton, Ohio) died on January 28, 2020, at the age of 75.

== Band members ==
The members of the Lemon Pipers were drummer William "Bill" E. Albaugh (born January 9, 1946, Oxford, Ohio – died January 20, 1999. Batesville, Indiana), guitarist Bill Bartlett (born February 28, 1943, Dayton, Ohio), vocalist Dale "Ivan" Browne (born March 10, 1945, Dayton, Ohio), keyboardist Robert G. Nave (born November 3, 1944, Dayton, Ohio – died January 28, 2020), and bassist Steve Walmsley (born 1948, Oxford, Ohio), who replaced the original bass guitarist Bob "Dude" Dudek.

Timeline

== Discography ==
=== Studio albums ===
Year	Album	Label	US
1968	Green Tambourine	Buddah BDS-5009	90
1968	Jungle Marmalade (Note: The US version of Jungle Marmalade contained "Lonely Atmosphere" (side 2, track 2) and is listed as such on the side 2 label, although it is misidentified as "Mirrors" on the back of the album jacket. Conversely, the Canadian issue of this album featured a different song ("Mirrors") on side 2, track 2. On the Canadian issue, the track is erroneously identified as "Lonely Atmosphere" on the side 2 label. The jacket remained unchanged, with "Mirrors" correctly listed on the back cover. In short, the US version did not contain "Mirrors," whilst the Canadian version did not include "Lonely Atmosphere".)	Buddah BDS-5016	—
"—" denotes the release did not chart.

=== Compilation albums ===
- Best of the Lemon Pipers (Camden/BMG, 1998)
- Green Tambourine: The Best of the Lemon Pipers (Buddha 99798, 2001)

=== Singles ===
Year	Single	Chart positions						Catalogue
Year	Single	US	US CB	CAN	AUS	NZ	UK	Catalogue
1966	"Quiet Please" / "Quiet Please" (long version)	—	—	—	—	—	—	Dana Records 70610
1967	"Turn Around and Take a Look" / "Danger"	132	—	—	—	—	—	Buddah BDA-11
1967	"Green Tambourine" / "No Help from Me"	1	1	3	2	3	7	Buddah BDA-23 / AU: Astor AP-1445 / UK: Pye International 7N-25444
1968	"Quiet Please" / "Monaural 78" (instrumental)	—	—	—	—	—	—	Carol Records 107
1968	"Rice Is Nice" / "Blueberry Blue"	46	42	40	37	6	41	Buddah BDA-31 / AU: Astor AP-1466 / UK: Pye International 7N-25454
1968	"Jelly Jungle (of Orange Marmalade)" / "Shoeshine Boy"	51	30	20	26	—	—	Buddah BDA-41 / AU: Astor AP-1492 / UK: Pye International 7N-25464
1968	"Wine and Violet" / "Lonely Atmosphere"	—	—	—	—	—	—	Buddah BDA-63
1968	"Love Beads and Meditation" / "The Shoemaker of Leatherware Square"	—	—	—	—	—	—	AU only: Astor AP-1558
1969	"Rainbow Tree" / "Hard Core"	—	—	—	—	—	—	Buddah BDA-124
1969	"I Was Not Born To Follow" / "Rainbow Tree"	—	—	87	—	—	—	Buddah BDA-136
1975	"Green Tambourine" / "Jelly Jungle" (re-issue)	—	—	—	—	—	—	UK only: Buddah BDS-422
"—" denotes releases that did not chart or were not released in that territory.

== See also ==
- List of artists who reached number one in the United States
- List of 1960s one-hit wonders in the United States
