= Trance (band) =

German heavy metal band

- Also known as: Age (1977–1979); Trancemission (1989–1992)
- Origin: Edenkoben, Germany
- Genre: Heavy metal
- Years active: 1977–present
- Labels: Rockport; Rough Trade
- Members: Markus Berger; Guitar (1977–1998 / since 2011); Thomas Klein; Bass (1979–1995 / since 2011); Andreas "Neudi" Neuderth; Drums (since 2016); Jürgen Baum; Drums (1979–1995 / 2011–2012 / 2018 )
- Past members: Lothar Antoni; Vocals, Guitar (1977–1998); Danke Würfel; Vocals (2011); Michael Kessler; Guitar (1981); Andreas Meyer; Guitar (1996–1998); Hans-Peter Jantzer; Bass (1977–1979); Michael D’Aquiar; Bass (1996); Stefan Gordon; Drums (1977–1979); Manfred „Manni“ Reckendorfer; Drums (1996–1998); Roland Moschel; Keyboards (2011–2016); Jürgen „The Animal“ Kapier; Drums (2013–2016); Joachim „Joe“ Strubel; Vocals (2012–2017); Jens Gellner; Drums (2016–2017); Eddie St.James; Guitar (2016–2018)
- Website: trance-live-and-heavy.com

Trance (stylised as TRANCE) is a German heavy metal band formed in Edenkoben. They are considered to be one of the co-founders of German heavy metal, starting as early as the late 1970s and the beginning of the 1980s. Trance is active again as of 2011 under the original name TRANCE with original co-founders Markus Berger and Tommy Klein, after a temporary name change to Trancemission, which was then furthered by the other co-founding member Lothar Antoni.

== History ==
=== Founding ===
1974 saw the duo of singer Lothar Antoni and guitarist Markus Berger with drummer Stefan Gerdon and bassist Hansi Jantzer and keyboarder Clemens Schlindwein as a school band under the name „TRIBUT“ coming together to make their own music. In 1978 Markus Berger, Lothar Antoni, Hans-Peter Jantzer and Stefan Gerdon founded the band AGE, which they renamed TRANCE in the following year. In 1980, the band took part in a rock competition, winning second place at the festival of the "Förderpreis“ (funding/advancement) of Ludwigshafen on the Rhine River and was also the winner of the SWF3 music festival in Rülzheim. At the turn of the year 1980/1981, Jantzer and Gerdon departed from the band, whereupon bassist Thomas Klein and drummer Jürgen Baum were then hired, as well as a second guitarist in 1981, Michael Kessler who was briefly in the band for a few months. In August 1981, the band produced its first single "A Hard Way to Go" / "Haze in the Twilight2 at the Bad Cannstatter recording studio "Zuckerfabrik" (sugar factory). The effort and extra step of recording a vinyl single was taken because usually demo cassettes were used and sent out when searching for a label (record company) deal, and here the band began to immediately stand out from the competition.

In 1981, Trance signed their first record deal with the Rockport Records label. In December of the same year, the first album „Break Out“ was recorded, which shortly thereafter turned into an "overnight sensation", due to the almost eight-minute-long song "Loser" which unexpectedly turned into the band's first hit and helped the group to an international breakthrough. In early 1982, a tour of Benelux and Germany followed, which included 14 appearances.

=== Record deal and interlude as Trancemission ===
The first two albums, Break Out (1982) and Power Infusion (1983), were released by the label Rockport Records, with a total of 150,000 units sold by these two recordings. Shortly thereafter, Trance gave concerts all over Germany, as well as in the Netherlands and Belgium, ca. 150 shows per year. Trance began opening for groups like Accept and Warlock-etc. The unit also played in the Netherlands at the Aardschok Festival together with Vandenberg, Mercyful Fate and Raven. 1985 followed the album Victory, this album being recorded at the Dierks Studios (Scorpions) in Stommeln and thus began the disharmony between the group and its record company, over artistic control and differences which even extended right down to the album cover design. In a Metal Hammer interview with singer Lothar Antoni, who described the circumstances as being attributed to the differences in the marketing strategy and approach, the band separated from their label as well as with their manager. At this point, the name of the band, including marketing and use rights, was sanctioned and legally frozen by the band's label and management. The situation at this point forced the precarious name change which became relevant on their next album titled „Back in Trance“ with the new band name "Trancemission". However, this fact was denied at the time and claimed that the new name simply reflected the situation as a new beginning or rather a new „-mission". The new beginning with Dieter Dierks, to which all label tasks had been transferred, but regretfully due to the incessant involvement with the Scorpions and Accept, was not to be. The group then returned to Rockport Records; after the band had regained their name rights, the name was then again changed back to „TRANCE“ and subsequently released Rockers in 1992. The album features a cover version of „When a Man Loves a Woman“ by and also starring Percy Sledge in a Heavy Rock duo version with Trance frontman and lead singer Antoni The album was published / released by Mausoleum Records / Belgium. After which, the members of the group decided to disband upon conclusion of their farewell tour. However, since the demand for the band was again very high, they decided to continue and founded the World of Trance GmbH (Inc.). In 1993 came the release „Boulevard of Broken Dreams“ and in 1994 „Shock Power“, a compilation with newly recorded songs off of the first two albums. Internal differences led again to the band's dissolution. Berger and Antoni decided to revive the band renewed with new members, adding a new second guitar, which was the longtime band roadie Andreas Meyer, on bass Michael D'Aguiar and on drums Manni Reckendorfer and during this time Antoni also moved temporarily to bass. With this new line-up and configuration, the band released the album Die Hard through LCP Productions at the end of 1996.

=== Dissolution and rebirth as Trancemission ===
In 1998, Trance was then finally laid to rest as a functioning outfit and separated with 2 of its then members reviving the earlier alter ego „Transmission“. Lothar Antoni (back on guitar) and Andreas Meyer (guitar) went back into the studio in 2002 and in 2003, the album „Back in Trance II“ was released, with Joe J. Hagl on bass and Alex Franken on drums. This time with half of the last inception of TRANCE remaining active under the name of „Trancemission“ and in August 2005, their follow-up album was recorded and released in October of the same year with the title „Mine“. As of 1998 „TRANCE“ had effectively and permanently separated into 2 camps- „Transmission“ under Lothar Antoni and later „TRANCE“ under original founding members Markus Berger and Tommy Klein, although „TRANCE“ were to remain basically inactive until 2011.

=== Second refounding as TRANCE ===
In March 2011, the former Trance musicians Markus Berger, Jürgen Baum and Thomas Klein decided to reunite with the new singer Daniel Würfel under the original name „Trance“. The comeback took place in July 2011 at the Winestock Festival, near Neustadt an der Weinstraße, supported by guest keyboarder Roland Moschel. At the end of 2011 they parted company with Daniel Würfel and they continued to search for a suitable replacement. In 2012, Joachim "Joe" Strubel, who was active in bands such as AC / ID, an AC / DC tribute band and Crusader, a Saxon tribute band, was hired as the next frontman for the group. Roland Moschel, keyboarder for the band „Someone Else“ and previously a guest musician with Trance, had then become a permanent member of the band. Under the motto "Trance, Back in Town" the reintroduction of „Trance“ took place in Landau / Pfalz area of Germany on December 21, 2012, the first concert with this newly reformed line-up in the music hall called the Colosseum. In early 2013, the band parted ways with the original founding member Jürgen Baum. A successor was found in Jürgen "The Animal" Kappner, with whom Trance would be appearing on August 16, 2013, at the Plätzelfeschd Festival (German slang for small place festival) an open-air festival in the south-west (Rhineland-Palatinate) area of Germany.

Since the band was blocked due to private reasons from making live appearances between 2011 and 2015, only a few concerts were held. In January 2016, the group decided to record a new album, which was then realized between April and July of the same year at the VPS Studios in Hamm (Germany) with producer Charly Czajkowski (Rage, Axxis). The release took place in early 2017. In March 2016, Mike Möller (Break Out Promotion) took over the management of the band and in April 2016 Roland Moschel and Jürgen Kappner left the group on very amicable terms. As a newcomer in May, Andreas "Neudi" Neuderth of Manilla Road was secured as the new drummer, with whom the entire new TRANCE album was recorded. Since "Neudi" is obliged to his many international concert commitments and limited in time for his duties with Trance, a suitable solution with two world-class drummers was to be implemented. Drummer Jens Gellner from „Masters of Disguise“ has been a member of the band since July 2016. As the new second guitarist coming additionally in August 2016 Eddie St. James from Hollywood / Los Angeles to round out the latest TRANCE line-up.

=== 2016 to present ===
Trance recruits three new members in 2016: Eddie St.James (Git./ Voc.), Jens Gellner (Drums) and Andreas "Neudi" Neuderth (Drums), who join forces in August 2016 with legendary German metal band Trance alongside founding members Markus Berger and Thomas Klein. The group rehearsed for 2 months and then went immediately out on tour in October 2016 with three warm-up shows before joining Udo Dirkschneider (Accept) as support along with Vicious Rumors on the last leg of the "Back to the Roots" European / worldwide tour in December 2016. Trance also recorded a brand new album entitled "The Loser Strikes Back" which was issued for release as of March 2017 and concurrently was also the start of the next European-wide tour for the band. The album "The Loser Strikes Back" entered the German Top 100 Charts on 7 April 2017 and finally reached No. 98.

2017 saw the re-release of the 1992 TRANCE album Rockers in November that year, by the group's label Rockport Records / Rough Trade. The original release was stopped at the time shortly thereafter due to legal problems that the record company (Mausoleum Records) was facing, which eventually led to the insolvency and closing of the company - this resulted in the loss of all the original pressings that were never to be seen again. This unique recording featuring Percy Sledge in duet, in the only "Heavy Metal" version of his hit "When A Man Loves A Woman," is now available again as a complete work to the public.

Trance joined Canadian metal band Anvil (from February to March 2018) on their 40th Anniversary "Pounding the Pavement" Tour. Trance was on the European leg of the tour (21 dates / 7 countries) through Belgium, France, Spain, Italy, Switzerland, Germany and Denmark. Trance is also reported to be featuring a new frontman, Nick Holleman (ex-Vicious Rumors). The group Trance also featured in addition to a new frontman and for the first time since the mid-1990s, three original members of the original inception of the band, which now includes co-founding member/drummer Jürgen Baum alongside the two other co-founders Markus Berger and Thomas Klein. The tour line-up for Trance: Nick Holleman (vocals), Markus Berger (guitar), Thomas Klein (bass), Eddie St.James (guitar), Neudi (drums) and Jürgen Baum (drums). The beginning of 2018 saw the release of a double re-release package of the two 1990s-era Trance albums Boulevard Of Broken Dreams and Die Hard on the Rockport / Rough Trade label.

== Style ==
In his book The Collector's Guide to Heavy Metal - Volume 2: The Eighties, Martin Popoff described Break-Out as traditional and melodic German heavy metal, reminiscent of groups like 220 Volt, the Swedish Overdrive or Accept's Balls to the Wall. Lothar Anthoni's singing is reminiscent of groups like Trouble or Nazareth. Lyrically, the band addresses the moral emptiness of the world, preaching a compassionate anarchy and exposing the flaws that result therefrom. Popoff drew comparisons to Trouble again; on „Power Infusion“, the band focuses again on traditional heavy metal, but that which is located in the uptempo area. According to Popoff, he described the songs as philosophically and emotionally profound. On Victory, the band falls even deeper into the world of depression and claustrophobia, with which Popoff warned not to listen to the first three albums all at once; otherwise, you could fall into depression. In The Collector's Guide to Heavy Metal. Volume 3: The Nineties, Popoff wrote that on „Rockers“ the band barely reveals any of the sadness of their predecessors and that they had become too experimental. On the „Die Hard“ release, they had returned a bit to the roots: The speed of the songs varied frequently; these were well structured and would occasionally be reminiscent of U.D.O.

The Rock Hard encyclopedia arranged the band musically between Scorpions and Accept. According to Manfred Meyer from Metal Hammer, some would rank the band alongside Accept and Scorpions the third most important hard-rock band in Germany. In the review of "Victory", Frank admitted that he had never been able to do much with the band because he always considered them a Scorpions copy. Above all, the vocals were a major weakness of the band, which Antoni could not cover up, especially in the higher vocal ranges. According to Matthias Prenzel of Metal Hammer, „Back in Trance“ is the first album to succeed in bringing Trance out of the shadows of Accept and Scorpions. „…The vocals are suffering and almost pathetic, the riffs catchy and driving the rhythm…“. According to Andreas Schöwe from Metal Hammer, the band hardly reminds you of any of their predecessors on Boulevard of Broken Dreams, although at times they still sound reminiscent of groups like Scorpions, Accept, Grave Digger, Running Wild and Sinner. According to Martin Groß of Metal Hammer „Rockers“ could not build on the successes of its predecessors, the music on this album was more like “quite unspeakable cafeteria hard rock". Schöwe described Shock Power as "a well-shuffled conglomeration" of the first two albums, Break out (1982) and Power Infusion (1983).

== Discography ==
=== Studio albums ===
- Break Out (1982; Rockport Records)
- Power Infusion (1983; Rockport Records)
- Victory (1985)
- Back in Trance (1989)
- Rockers (1992)
- Boulevard of Broken Dreams (1993)
- Shock Power (1994)
- Die Hard (1996)
- The Loser Strikes Back (2017)
- Metal Force (2021)

=== Singles ===
- "A Hard Way to Go" (1981)
- "Heavy Metal Queen" (1984)
- "When a Man Loves a Woman" (1992)
- "Close to You" (1993)
- "Die Hard" (1996)

=== Compilations ===
- Metamorphosis (5 CDs) (1996), released only in Asia
- Experience (The Ballads) (1996), released only in Asia

=== Re-releases ===
- Rockers (2017; Rockport Records / Rough Trade)
- Die Hard / Boulevard Of Broken Dreams - Double Re-Release (2018; Rockport Records / Rough Trade)

=== Other information ===
- From 1995, the CD production of Early Days, saw only six units exist - the CD was never officially released to the public.
- Trance's version of "When A Man Loves A Woman" (including a video) together in duet with Percy Sledge was recorded before the version with Sledge and Michael Bolton.

=== Charts ===
Title	Rock- / Metal Charts (Listing by country)					
Title	UK	NL	BE	LU	FR	CH
Loser			1			
Baby Child		2	1	3		
Heavy Metal Queen	1	1	1		2	4
Break the Chains		1	1	1	1	

Album	Rock- / Metal Charts *Top 100 (Listing by country)			
Album	IT	JP	KR	DE
Boulevard of Broken Dreams	7	3		
Die Hard			8	
Experience (The Ballads)			10	
The Loser Strikes Back				*98
