= The Peppermint Rainbow =

American sunshine pop group from Baltimore, Maryland

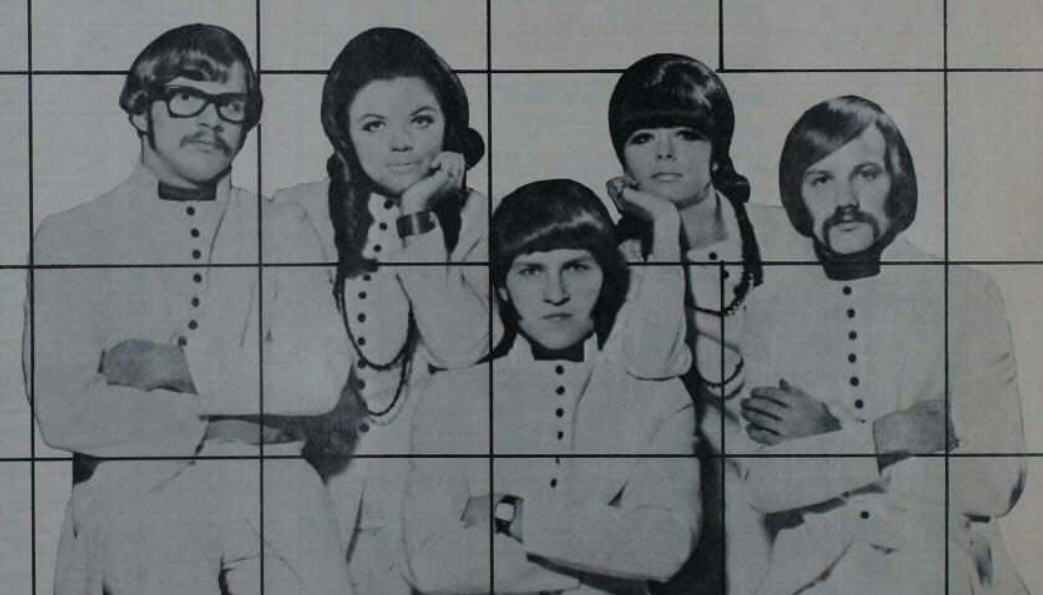
- The Peppermint Rainbow (1968)

Background information
- Origin: Baltimore, Maryland, USA
- Genres: sunshine pop
- Years active: 1967–1970
- Past members: Bonnie Lamdin; Patty Lamdin; Doug Lewis; Anton Corey; Skip Harris

The Peppermint Rainbow was an American sunshine pop group from Baltimore, Maryland, known for their song "Will You Be Staying After Sunday".

== History ==
The group formed in 1967 under the name "New York Times" playing to local gigs in the mid-Atlantic states. It was signed to Decca Records in 1968 at the behest of talent agent Alan White at Action Talents in NYC, who brought it to New York and showcased it for producer Paul Leka who saw the group play and sing both a medley of the Mamas and the Papas and the 5th Dimension tunes. The group changed its name to "The Peppermint Rainbow" following its signing by Leka.

Under Decca the group was produced by Paul Leka; its first single "Walking in Different Circles" b/w "Pink Lemonade" did not chart. The second single, "Will You Be Staying After Sunday", reached No. 4 on KHJ on April 2, 1969. Nationally, it spent 14 weeks on the U.S. Billboard Hot 100 and reached No. 32 on May 3, 1969, selling over one million copies and receiving a gold disc. The song also reached No. 21 on the Cash Box Top 100, and in Canada it peaked at No. 19.

The group made an appearance on the 2 May 1969 episode of The Generation Gap television quiz show from which the promotional clip of the song originates. As with many television performances of the period, the song is mimed to the studio recording. The group's third release, "Don't Wake Me Up in the Morning, Michael", spent nine weeks on the Billboard Hot 100, and reached No. 54 on July 26, 1969, while reaching No. 21 on Billboard's Easy Listening chart. The LP, Will You Be Staying After Sunday peaked at No. 106 on the Billboard album chart.

After recording three more post-album singles which also did not chart, including "Walking in Different Circles" (which had some minor airplay in the UK), and "You're the Sound of Love", the band split up in 1970, after which the chorus of the latter tune would come to be re-arranged and re-recorded in the early 1970s as "We're the Sound of Love" and used as an ID jingle for a number of radio stations featuring love songs prominently on their playlist.

== Singles discography ==
"Will You Be Staying After Sunday"

Chart (1969)	Peak position
Canada RPM Adult Contemporary	7
Canada RPM 100	19
U.S. Billboard Hot 100	32
U.S. Cash Box Top 100	21
U.S. Billboard Easy Listening	22

"Don't Wake Me Up in the Morning, Michael"

Chart (1969)	Peak position
Canada RPM Adult Contemporary	24
Canada RPM 100	47
U.S. Billboard Hot 100	54
U.S. Cash Box Top 100	50
U.S. Billboard Easy Listening	21

== Members ==
- Bonnie Lamdin – vocals
- Patty Lamdin – vocals
- Doug Lewis – guitar
- Anton Corey – percussion
- Skip Harris (deceased) – bass
