= Blind Willies =

Blind Willies is an American folk rock band based in San Francisco, California, United States. The group was founded by singer-songwriter Alexei Wajchman, while he was a student at San Francisco School of the Arts in 2002. The band began as a duo, with guitarist Wajchman and fiddler Annie Staninec, playing covers of American folk songs. They soon made the transition to Wajchman's original songs which he began writing when he was 15.

== Career ==
Wajchman and Staninec graduated from School of the Arts and continued to play together at University of California, Santa Cruz. In 2007, the band released its first professional album, The Unkindness of Ravens, written by Wajchman. The album received prominent notice from KQED and from Jenn O'Donnell, editor of the online music zine DOA, who wrote "Blind Willies play incredibly wonderful music. Alexei is a remarkable songwriter whose lyrics go well beyond the average ramblings of most singer-songwriters. Even 'Mainline' – with its 'hungry pawn store prisoners' – is well-crafted enough to run with the big boys and Wajchman wrote the song at the tender age of 15." The album also received praise from Americana UK, where reviewer Paul Villers wrote "What is beyond question is Wajchman’s skill as a storyteller. Of the Willy Vlautin school, these ten tales explore the darker side of life with word play that is evocative of a quiet desperation, a cool loathing of unavoidable situations or perhaps a pitiful yearning for redemption."

Blind Willies toured locally in California and on the East Coast. They played at San Francisco's Hardly Strictly Bluegrass Festival, Berkeley's legendary Freight and Salvage Coffeehouse, San Francisco's Free Folk Festival, DjangoFest, Brooklyn's Barbès where they opened for Stephane Wrembel, and Manhattan's SideWalk Cafe where they played with Peter Stampfel (The Holy Modal Rounders, The Fugs).

In June 2008, after releasing Everybody's Looking for a Meal, the band's second album of songs written by Wajchman, the duo broke up. The album received high praise from reviewers and Wajchman was invited to play the Emerging Artist Showcase at the Falcon Ridge Folk Festival, where he was accompanied by Meg Okura. On July 27, 2008, two songs from the newly released album, 'Sinners Medley' and 'Mom Says No', were featured on Robert Sherman's WFUV radio show, Woody's Children, the longest running folk music broadcast in the country. In July 2009, Canada's Radio Shalom, an internationally broadcast Jewish programming station, featured several songs from the album, including 'Sinners Medley', on host Helene Engel's show, Les faces cachées de la musique juive.

In 2009, Wajchman finished writing his third album of original songs and soon began rehearsals with musicians he had first met in high school at School of the Arts: Misha Khalikulov(cello), Daniel Riera(flute, bass), Max Miller-Loran(keys, trumpet), and Adam Coopersmith(drums). The new album Needle, Feather, and a Rope was released in April 2011 and was widely acclaimed. Shortly after the album's release, Coopersmith left the band and was replaced by Alex Nash, also a graduate of San Francisco School of the Arts. Alex's twin brother, Adam Nash(guitar), joined the band in 2014.

In 2013, the band completed recording a new album, Every Day Is Judgment Day, Alexei Wajchman's fourth collection of original songs. Germany's Wasser-Prawda named it Album of the Month in July 2014. Blind Willies embarked on the band's first European tour(Ireland, UK, Netherlands, Belgium, Germany) in August 2013, and toured UK, Belgium, Netherlands, and Germany again May 2015-July.

Blind Willies songs have been played on more than 200 radio stations around the world, including the US, Netherlands, Germany, France, Italy, UK, Israel, Australia, and Canada.

Members of Blind Willies also play with Rupa and the April Fishes, Watsky, Goodnight, Texas, Marcus Cohen and The Congress, Meklit Hadero, Kev Choice Ensemble, and The Getback.

== Origin of band name ==
Wajchman told writer Tony DuShane in an interview for the San Francisco Chronicle's 10/21/2011 96 Hours entertainment section: "At 15, I discovered Blind Willie Johnson, Blind Willie McTell, Blind Blake, and Blind Lemon Jefferson. I started the band as a folk duo in high school and I wanted to pay homage to the musicians who inspired me, musically and lyrically. I’d been influenced by white musicians who’d been influenced by black musicians. The blind, black itinerant guitar players absorbed the hymns they heard in church and enriched those hymns with the influences of folk music and street culture. They were living sieves with heightened aural senses. They wrote songs with titles like 'Dark Was The Night, Cold Was The Ground', 'The Soul of a Man', 'Broke Down Engine Blues', 'Lord I Wish I Could See'. I wanted to write songs as immediate and powerful. The name Blind Willies is appropriate to the cauldron of our various influences."

== Discography ==
1. The Unkindness of Ravens, 2007, Diggory Records
2. Everybody's Looking for a Meal, 2008, Diggory Records
3. Needle, Feather, and a Rope, 2011, Diggory Records
4. Every Day is Judgment Day, (July 2014, Diggory Records)
