= Paul Leka =

American musician (1943–2011)

- Born: February 20, 1943; Bridgeport, Connecticut
- Died: October 12, 2011 (aged 68); Sharon, Connecticut
- Occupations: Songwriter; record producer; pianist; arranger; orchestrator
- Spouse: Engjellushe Leka (before 2011)
- Children: 4

Paul Leka (February 20, 1943 – October 12, 2011) was an American songwriter, record producer, pianist, arranger, and orchestrator, most notable for co-writing the 1960s hits "Green Tambourine" and "Na Na Hey Hey Kiss Him Goodbye", the latter of which has become a standard song at sporting events.

== Life and career ==
Born in Bridgeport, Connecticut, Leka was one of four children of Theodore and Dhimitra Leka, immigrants from Albania. His father worked as a short-order cook. Soon after he started taking piano lessons, Paul was writing songs, and by age 16, his brother said, he was trying to sell them to music publishers in New York.

Described as "one of those rare, genuinely prodigious musicians who was too talented to limit himself to actually being a member of one group or recording project", Leka grew up in Connecticut and played piano as a child and later became a multi-instrumentalist. He played with a group called the Chateaus, who recorded some singles for Coral Records in the 1960s. Leka soon gave up performing for production and arranging work. He principally wrote songs for and had hits with the Lemon Pipers (for whom, with Shelley Pinz, he wrote "Green Tambourine"), the Peppermint Rainbow in which he produced, arranged, and orchestrated for their song "Will You Be Staying After Sunday", and Steam, which featured two of his bandmates from the Chateaus, and who scored a multiplatinum hit with the Leka co-written "Na Na Hey Hey Kiss Him Goodbye". Leka is credited in particular with writing the well-known "Na Na Hey Hey" chorus. To get the right sound for that song, Leka said he used a hammer to bang directly on the piano keys. During this same period, Leka became a producer and arranger for the Left Banke, producing and arranging the majority of the songs on The Left Banke Too.

Leka won many awards including gold records for his hits.

Leka worked in the industry into the 1980s, producing Richmond, Virginia band, The Dads, and writing and arranging for artists such as Peter Nero, Jimmie Spheeris, Tim Moore, Harry Chapin, REO Speedwagon, Lori Lieberman, and Gloria Gaynor.

Leka owned a recording studio called Connecticut Recording, located above a five and dime store on Main Street, Bridgeport. He recorded a number of performers there over the years, including Harry Chapin, who recorded Cat's in the Cradle at the studio. Leka later relocated the studio to his home in Sharon.

Leka died of lung cancer on October 12, 2011, at a hospice near his home in Sharon, Connecticut. He was survived by his wife, Engjellushe, their son Alexander, and two children from his first marriage, Derek and Heather. A fourth child (third son), Theodore, predeceased him.

== Songwriting credits ==
- "(Tell Me) Who Am I" – Judy White
- "And I'll Be There" – The Peppermint Rainbow
- "Baby Stay And Make Me Happy" – Gary Carl And The Orchids
- "Blueberry Blue" – The Lemon Pipers
- "Come On" – Jay Traynor
- "Come on Back and Love Me" – Steam
- "Come on Home Girl" – Steam
- "Do Unto Others" – Steam
- "Don't Love Me Unless It's Forever" – The Peppermint Rainbow
- "Don't Stop Lovin' Me" – Steam
- "Everything Is You" – The Lemon Pipers
- "Falling Sugar" – The Palace Guard
- "From My Window (I Can See)" – Brooklyn Bridge
- "Gail Can You Hear Me" – Craig Norback
- "Get Yourself Ready" – Dave Armstrong And The One Eyed Jacks
- "Girl You'll See What You're Doin' To Me" – The Younger Society
- "Going To Bethel" – Route 17
- "Green Tambourine" – The Lemon Pipers
- "Groovy Personality" – The Zebra
- "I Need Someone (The Painter)" – Music Asylum
- "I'm Gonna Give You All My Love" – Garrett Scott
- "I'm the One Who Loves You" – Steam
- "I'm In A Lonely Situation (Love Is All I Need)" – Herman's Hermits
- "I've Cried a Million Tears" – Steam
- "I've Gotta Make You Love Me" – Steam
- "It's Funny How Fast You Forgot Me" – The Leaders
- "It's the Magic in You Girl" – Steam
- "Jelly Jungle (Of Orange Marmalade)" – The Lemon Pipers
- "Little Red Boat By The River" – Brooklyn Bridge
- "Lonely Atmosphere" – The Lemon Pipers
- "Lorraine (My Lorraine)" – Wellington Arrangement
- "Lost In Love" – "Anthony and the Imperials"
- "Lots of Pretty Girls" – Tommy James & the Shondells
- "Love and Affection" – Steam
- "Melissa Jones" – Wellington Arrangement
- "Na Na Hey Hey Kiss Him Goodbye" – Steam
- "New Breed, Now Generation" – Steam
- "Now That I Love You" – Garrett Scott
- "One Good Woman" – Steam
- "Pink Lemonade" – The Five Americans
- "Pretty Thing" – The Plum Beach Incident and Gary Lewis & the Playboys
- "Rice Is Nice" – The Lemon Pipers
- "Rolling Dice" – The Hitchhikers
- "Rosemary" – The Peppermint Rainbow
- "Run Like the Devil" – The Peppermint Rainbow
- "She Belongs To Me" – Paul and Dale
- "She Is a Little Bit Sweeter" – Paul Mauriat
- "Snow White" – The Devotions
- "Shoeshine Boy" – The Lemon Pipers
- "Shoemaker Of Leatherwear Square" – The Lemon Pipers
- "Summer's Here (School Is Through)" – The Chateaus
- "The Penthouse" – Lynn Roman
- "Twin Sisters" – Paul and Dale
- "What I'm Saying Is True" – Steam
- "Yesterday I Took A Picture Of Me For You" – Joanne Jonas
- "You Are The One I Love" – Adam's Apples
- "You Call It Love" – All 6
- "You're The Sound Of Love" – Peppermint Rainbow

== Production credits ==
- "REO Speedwagon" – REO Speedwagon (1971) (with Billy Rose II)
- "R.E.O./T.W.O." – REO Speedwagon (1972) (with Billy Rose II)
