= No Promises...No Debts =

Studio album by Golden Earring
- Released: July 1979
- Genre: Hard rock
- Length: 40:28
- Label: Polydor
- Producer: George Kooymans

Golden Earring chronology
Grab It for a Second (1978)	No Promises...No Debts (1979)	Prisoner of the Night (1980)

Singles from No Promises...No Debts
- 1. "Weekend Love" Released: June 1979

Professional ratings
Review scores
Source	Rating
AllMusic	3/5 stars

No Promises...No Debts is an album by Dutch hard rock band Golden Earring, released in 1979. In the U.S. the album was released with a different cover photo showing the group standing around.

== Track listing ==
All songs written by Gerritsen, Hay, Kooymans, and Zuiderwijk.

Side one

1. "Heart Beat" - 3:00
2. "Need Her" - 3:07
3. "Sellin' Out" - 3:46
4. "Snot Love in Spain" - 3:50
5. "Save Your Skin" - 6:42

Side two

1. "D Light" - 3:34
2. "Tiger Bay" - 3:12
3. "Weekend Love" - 4:14
4. "Don't Close the Door" - 3:29
5. "Don't Stop the Show" - 2:41
6. "By Routes" - 2:53

== Personnel ==
Golden Earring

- Barry Hay – vocals, guitar, flute; lead vocals (1, 2, 4–7, 9, 10)
- George Kooymans – guitar, vocals; lead vocals (3, 5, 8)
- Rinus Gerritsen – bass guitar, keyboards
- Cesar Zuiderwijk – drums

Additional musician

- John Legrand – harmonica (4, 7)

Production

- Producer: George Kooymans
- Engineer: John Kriek
- Mixing: George Kooymans, John Kriek, Arnold Muhren
- Horn arrangements: Jan Rietman
- Cover design: Jeep Bunt

== Charts ==
Chart (1979)	Peak position
Dutch Albums (Album Top 100)	2
