= Ram Jam (album) =

Studio album by Ram Jam
- Released: June 20, 1977
- Recorded: 1977
- Studios: K&K Studio City, Great Neck, New York
- Genres: Rock; hard rock
- Length: 34:19; 39:23 (Golden Classics)
- Label: Epic (US)
- Producers: Jeffry Katz, Jerry Kasenetz

Ram Jam chronology
Ram Jam (1977)	Portrait of the Artist as a Young Ram (1978)

Singles from Ram Jam
- 1. "Black Betty" Released: March 1977; 2. "Keep Your Hands on the Wheel" Released: September 1977

Ram Jam is the debut studio album by American rock band Ram Jam in 1977. The first track on the album, the single "Black Betty", is Ram Jam's best known song. It went to No. 7 on the UK singles chart in September 1977. The album reached No. 34 on the Billboard Pop Albums chart in the United States. The band was re-christened "American Ram Jam" for the UK market to avoid confusion with a UK band bearing the same name.

In 1996, the album was reissued on CD as Golden Classics with a bonus track, "I Should Have Known", which was originally the B-side to the "Black Betty" single.

Professional ratings
Review scores
Source	Rating
AllMusic	3/5 stars

== Track listing ==
No.	Title	Writer(s)	Length
1.	"Black Betty"	Huddie Ledbetter (arr. Bill Bartlett)	3:57
2.	"Let It All Out"	Bartlett	3:59
3.	"Keep Your Hands on the Wheel"	Mike Millius; Thom Graves	3:34
4.	"Right on the Money"	Bartlett	3:11
5.	"All for the Love of Rock n' Roll"	Jeff Salen; Robert Butani	3:00
6.	"404"	Gerard W. Kenny	3:44
7.	"High Steppin'"	Bartlett	3:40
8.	"Overloaded"	Joseph LaPallo; William Haberman	2:54
9.	"Hey Boogie Woman"	Bartlett	3:09
10.	"Too Bad on Your Birthday"	Arthur Resnick; Charles Karp	3:11

Golden Classics bonus track
No.	Title	Writer(s)	Length
11.	"I Should Have Known"	Bartlett	4:50

== Charts ==
Chart (1977)	Peak position
Australia (Kent Music Report)	16
United Kingdom (Official Charts Company)	7
United States (Billboard 200)	34

== Personnel ==
- Bill Bartlett – guitar, vocals
- Myke Scavone – vocals, percussion (tracks 2–11)
- Howie Blauvelt – bass guitar, vocals (tracks 2–11)
- Peter Charles – drums (tracks 2–11)
- David Goldflies – bass guitar (track 1)
- Tom Kurtz – guitar (track 1)
- David Fleeman – drums (track 1)

Production

- Jeffry Katz – producer
- Jerry Kasenetz – producer
- Stanisław Zagórski – cover art
