= Todd Meagher =

American entrepreneur and songwriter (born 1961)

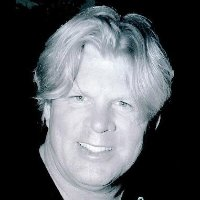
Meagher in 2009

Todd Meagher is an American entrepreneur and songwriter.

== Music career ==
Throughout the 1980s Meagher's company Todd Meagher Music had a co-publishing songwriter deal with Warner/Chappell Music co-writing songs with artists including: Brad Gillis and Kelly Keagy for Night Ranger; Alexey "Alexei" Belov for Gorky Park; Jorge DeSaint and Stevie Rachelle for Tuff; Greg D'Angelo and James LoMenzo for White Lion; Erik Turner for Warrant; Julian Lennon and James Scott Cook; Josh Todd; and Vince Neil (of Mötley Crüe).

In 2010, Meagher and his company TODD Entertainment, LLC sued The Agency Group and booking agency TKO's President Andrew Goodfriend, seeking $20 million in damages. The case was settled in 2017.

Meagher is a voting member of the National Academy of Recording Arts and Sciences, which organizes the Grammy Awards, as well as being affiliated with the Warner Chappell Music and Broadcast Music, Inc. as a writer and music publisher.

== Internet ventures ==
In, 2009, Meagher formed theRevolution, LLC, a music services company with John Lennon's son Julian Lennon and Michael Birch.

In 2010, Meagher again partnered with Lennon and Birch to relaunch MyStore.Com, an e-commerce website originally developed in 2005 for artists to sell their music and merchandise on their MySpace page.
