= Ram Jam =

American rock band

- Origin: New York City, U.S.
- Genres: Hard rock; boogie rock
- Years active: 1977–1978
- Labels: Epic, Rock Candy
- Spinoffs: Speedway Boulevard
- Past members: Bill Bartlett; Howard Arthur Blauvelt; Pete Charles; Jimmy Santoro; Myke Scavone

Ram Jam was an American rock band formed in New York City and active in 1977 and 1978, mainly known for their hit single, a rock adaptation of the Lead Belly song "Black Betty".

== Overview ==
The band consisted of Bill Bartlett (guitar and lead vocals), Howie Arthur Blauvelt (bass), Pete Charles (drums), and Myke Scavone (lead vocals). Jimmy Santoro, who toured with the band in support of their debut album, joined on guitar for the follow-up album. Bartlett was formerly lead guitarist for bubblegum group the Lemon Pipers. Blauvelt played with Billy Joel in several bands: the Echoes (also renamed the Lost Souls and then the Commandos), the Hassles and El Primo.

== History ==
=== Early days ===
Bill Bartlett went on from the Lemon Pipers to form a group called Starstruck. Starstruck originally included Steve Walmsley (bass) and Bob Nave (organ) from the Lemon Pipers. Walmsley left the band and was replaced by David Goldflies (who later played for years with Dickey Betts and Great Southern and the Allman Brothers). While in Starstruck, Bartlett took Lead Belly's 59 second long "Black Betty" and arranged, recorded and released it on the group's own TruckStar label.

"Black Betty" became a regional hit, then was picked up by producers in New York who formed a group around Bartlett called Ram Jam. They re-released the song, and it became a hit nationally. The Ram Jam "recording" was actually the same one originally recorded by Starstruck, albeit significantly edited to rearrange the song structure. The band at that time comprised Bartlett (lead guitar and vocals), Tom Kurtz (rhythm guitar and vocals), David Goldflies (bass), and David Fleeman (drums). The rest of the tracks on the first studio album containing "Black Betty" were played by the Ram Jam lineup. Even though the song was credited to Lead Belly, the NAACP and Congress of Racial Equality called for a boycott due to the lyrics.

The boycott failed and "Black Betty" reached number 18 on the singles chart in 1977 in the U.S., top ten in the UK Singles Chart and Australia, and number 46 in Canada, while the Ram Jam album reached the U.S. top 40. It was also a hit in the Netherlands, reaching number 4. In Canada, the album reached number 33.

=== Later ===
Their subsequent album Portrait of the Artist as a Young Ram achieved little success, despite the addition of Long Island, New York, lead guitarist Jimmy Santoro. The Portrait album was re-issued on Rock Candy Records from England in 2006. It is listed in the Top 100 lists in Martin Popoff's book The Collector's Guide to Heavy Metal Volume 1: The Seventies.

Three of the Ram Jam Touring members; guitarist Gregg Hoffman, bassist Dennis Feldman and drummer Glenn Dove, along with keyboardist Jordan Rudess and vocalist Roy Herring Jr. became the group Speedway Boulevard. Working with producers Jerry Kasenetz and Jeff Katz, they recorded single, "(Think I Better) Hold On and the self-titled album, which were released in 1980.

=== Post-hits ===
In the 1990s, both studio releases by Ram Jam were packaged together as a German import record entitled The Very Best of Ram Jam. The cover of the album features the same artwork as the self-titled debut album, and the track list is simply the ten titles from Ram Jam followed by the ten titles from Portrait of the Artist as a Young Ram. While the original Portrait of the Artist as a Young Ram started with the songs "Gone Wild" and "Pretty Poison", these two were moved to the end of The Very Best of Ram Jam.

In 1991, producers Kasenetz and Katz released a hip-house single called "We Rock the Mansion" as Ram Jam, which failed to chart. In 1994, they released an album called Ram Jam in France with a group of session musicians fronted by vocalist Don Chaffin, which failed to chart as well. Two singles were released from the album, "Ram Jam, Thank You Mam" (under which title the album was reissued in Germany in 1995) and "Black Betty '95", a cover of the 1990 "Rough 'n Ready" remix of the original Ram Jam song, both of which didn't chart. A 12" single of "Ram Jam, Thank You Mam" was also released in 1994, featuring a 7-minute rearrangement of the song.

A remix of "Black Betty" by Ben Liebrand reached number 13 in the UK Singles Chart in 1990. Cover versions of the song also appear on the 2002 album Mr. Jones by Tom Jones and on the 2004 album Tonight Alright by Australian rock band Spiderbait.

Bill Bartlett still plays guitar, but in the early 1990s transformed himself into a boogie-woogie piano player. He also plays banjo, harmonica, and has written dozens of songs. Santoro still plays professionally in various bands in New York, and teaches music at an elementary school on Long Island.

Scavone, who now resides in New Jersey, after many years detached from the music industry, recorded an album of 12 songs, both originals and cover versions with his former teenage garage rock band called the Doughboys. It was featured at the 40th Reunion of John Zacherle's Disc-O-Teen in 2004, which coincided with Zacherle's 84th birthday. The album, entitled Is It Now, included liner notes by John Hawkins, the original keyboard and piano player for the Nashville Teens.

Howie Blauvelt died in 1993 at age 44. Pete Charles, full name Peter Charles Picardio, died in 2002 at age 49 from unknown causes. Scavone continues to write and record original music with the Doughboys. In 2015, Scavone was recruited to play harmonica, percussion and backing vocals with his longtime heroes, the Yardbirds.

== Band members ==
Final lineup

- Myke Scavone – lead vocals, percussion (1977–1978)
- Bill Bartlett – guitar, lead vocals (1977–1978)
- Jimmy Santoro – guitar (1977–1978)
- Howard Arthur Blauvelt – bass, backing vocals (1977–1978; died 1993)
- Pete Charles – drums, percussion (1977–1978; died 2002)

Touring musicians

- Glenn Dove – drums (1978–1979)
- David E. Eicher – keyboards (1978–1979)
- Dennis Feldman – bass (1978–1979)
- Greg Hoffman – guitar (1978–1979)
- Sherwin Ace Ross – vocals (1978–1979)

== Discography ==
=== Studio albums ===
Year	Album	Chart positions			Label
Year	Album	US 200	AUS	CAN	Label
1977	Ram Jam	34	16	33	Epic
1978	Portrait of the Artist as a Young Ram	—	—	—	Epic
"—" denotes releases that did not chart.

=== Compilation albums ===
- The Very Best of Ram Jam (1990)

=== Singles ===
Year	Title	Peak chart positions			Certifications
Year	Title	US Pop	AUS	UK	Certifications
1977	"Black Betty"	18	3	7	BPI: Platinum
1977	"Keep Your Hands on the Wheel"	―	―	―	
1978	"Pretty Poison"	―	―	―	
1978	"Hurricane Ride"	―	―	―	
1990	"Black Betty" (Ben Liebrand remix)	―	17	13	
"—" denotes releases that did not chart.

== See also ==
- List of 1970s one-hit wonders in the United States
