= Eric Ehrmann =

American journalist

Eric Wayne Ehrmann (/ˈɛərmən/; born August 13, 1946) is an American author who follows sports, politics and weapon of mass destruction issues in Latin America.

Ehrmann's commentary on Latin American affairs has been published by The Christian Science Monitor, The Chicago Tribune, National Review, The New York Times The Buenos Aires Herald, The Journal of Commerce, USA Today, The Toronto Star, Huff Post, World Post, and Algemeiner.

From 1968 to 1971 Ehrmann was a feature writer for Rolling Stone, working under co-founder Jann S. Wenner. Later, his 1992 essay discussing the radical rock band MC5 and how the cultural freedom promoted by Rolling Stone helped facilitate regime change in Cold War Eastern Europe was featured in the magazine's 25th anniversary issue and the book The Best of Rolling Stone, 25 Years of Journalism on the Edge, which was published by Doubleday.

From 2009 to January 2018 his contributions on global affairs, sports and politics appeared regularly on HuffPost in English, Portuguese, Spanish, and French.

For several years, he authored the "Institutions and Competition" blog on the Russian International Affairs Council website; a think tank adjunct of the Russian Academy of Sciences. Since 2015 he has been involved in a series of projects overseen by the Intelligence Advanced Research Projects Activity (IARPA) that compare human analytics with machine predictions. As a researcher and contributor, Ehrmann's ID at ORCID is 0000-0002-1940-5740.

== South America and the Buenos Aires Herald ==
During the late 1980s, when Argentina was transitioning from dictatorship to democracy, Ehrmann lived in Buenos Aires and wrote columns for The Buenos Aires Herald. He worked with editors Dan Newland, Mike Soltys and Ronald Hansen. He also authored tourist location features on South America for "Clipper," the magazine of Pan Am Airlines, as well as political articles for National Review.

== The University of Virginia at Charlottesville ==
Returning to the United States in 1990, Ehrmann continued writing on proliferation issues, sometimes collaborating with Christopher Barton at the Center for National Security Law at the University of Virginia. He also investigated and published articles in The Journal of Commerce and The Christian Science Monitor discussing cooperation between Iraq and South American companies in connection with the Iraqi medium range guided missile program known as "Tammuz" in Iraq, and "Condor" in the West, and issues connected with the Nuclear Non-Proliferation Treaty (NPT) and the Missile Technology Control Regime (MTCR).

== Social media, Brazil and HuffPost ==
In 2008, as social media became more mainstream, Ehrmann accepted a consulting position with "Social Media Today," one of the early websites covering the social media beat. Able to work remotely, he opted for a change and relocated to Brazil. He is a U.S. citizen and lives in Brazil, where he holds permanent residence status.

In 2009 he started blogging on The Huffington Post. He was one of original bloggers on the HuffPost World section as it was being developed by then-editor Hanna Ingber. He is a lifelong fan of the Cleveland Browns and has blogged about them on HuffPost. His writing in Portuguese on HuffPost Brasil is no longer available online because owners of the publication shut it down.

== Sources ==
- "Jann S. Wenner - Press - Revolutionary, wild, unpredictable - and that was just the writers". www.jannswenner.com. Archived from the original on March 23, 2010.
