= Gravestone (band) =

German heavy metal band

- Origin: Illertissen, Bavaria, Germany
- Genres: Heavy metal, progressive rock
- Years active: 1977–1990, 2019–present
- Label: Scratch Records
- Members: Berti Majdan; Klaus 'Doc' Reinelt; Thomas Sabisch; Thomas Imbacher; Jürgen Metko
- Past members: Dieter Behle; Mathias Dieth; Rudi Dorner; Taki Gradl; Andy Müller; Dietmar "Oli" Orlitta; Wolfgang Rittner; Mike Schmidt

Gravestone is a German heavy metal band, formed in 1977 as a progressive rock outfit, before adopting the heavy metal genre.

Gravestone released five studio albums between 1977 and 1986; they then split up. Several of the members continued under the name 48 Crash. In 2019, the band reunited to play live shows. The line-up is that of 1985 (Majdan, Reinelt, Dieth, Sabisch, Imbacher).

== Band members ==
=== Vocals ===
- Berti Majdan
- Dietmar "Oli" Orlitta

=== Drums ===
- Dieter Behle
- Thomas Imbacher
- Mike Schmidt

=== Bass Guitar ===
- Berti Majdan
- Dietmar "Oli" Orlitta
- Thomas Sabisch

=== Guitar ===
- Mathias Dieth
- Rudi Dorner
- Taki Gradl
- Jürgen Metko
- Klaus 'Doc' Reinelt
- Wolfgang Rittner

=== Keyboards ===
- Andy Müller

== Discography ==
=== Albums ===
- Doomsday (1979)
- War (1980)
- Victim of Chains (1984)
- Back to Attack (1985)
- Creating a Monster (1986)

=== Compilation albums ===
- The Best of Gravestone (1993)
