= Bubblegum music =

Genre of pop music

Bubblegum
- Other names: Bubblegum pop • bubblegum rock
- Stylistic origins: Pop; rock; novelty songs; garage rock; Brill Building; beat music
- Cultural origins: Late 1960s, United States
- Derivative forms: Dance-pop; disco; glam rock; melodic metal; new wave; punk rock; twee pop; hyperpop; Bubblegrunge

Other topics
- Boy bands; power pop; teen pop

Bubblegum music (also called bubblegum pop or bubblegum rock) is pop music in a catchy and upbeat style that is marketed for children and adolescents. The term also refers to a more specific rock and pop subgenre, originating in the United States in the late 1960s, that evolved from garage rock, novelty songs, and the Brill Building sound, and which was also defined by its target demographic of preteens and young teenagers. The Archies' 1969 hit "Sugar, Sugar" was a representative example that led to cartoon rock, a short-lived trend of Saturday-morning cartoon series that heavily featured pop rock songs in the bubblegum vein.

Producer Jeffry Katz claimed credit for coining "bubblegum", saying that when they discussed their target audience, they decided it was "teenagers, the young kids. And at the time we used to be chewing bubblegum, and my partner and I used to look at it and laugh and say, 'Ah, this is like bubblegum music'." The term was then popularized by their boss, Buddah Records label executive Neil Bogart. It became often used as a pejorative for pop music that is perceived to be disposable and contrived.

Most bubblegum acts were one-hit wonders (notable exceptions included the Cowsills, the Partridge Family and Tommy Roe) and the sound remained a significant commercial force until the early 1970s. Commentators often debate the scope of the genre and have variously argued for the exclusion or inclusion of dance-pop, disco, teen pop, boy bands, and especially the Monkees. During the 1970s, the original bubblegum sound was a formative influence on punk rock, new wave, and melodic metal.

== Definitions ==
Occasionally invoked as a pejorative, the "bubblegum" descriptor has several different applications. In the 2001 book Bubblegum Music Is the Naked Truth, Kim Cooper and David Smay list five different uses of the term:

1. "the classic bubblegum era from 1967 to 1972"
2. "disposable pop music"
3. "pop music contrived and marketed to appeal to pre-teens"
4. "pop music produced in an assembly-line process, driven by producers and using faceless singers"
5. "pop music with that intangible, upbeat 'bubblegum' sound"

Cooper and Smay characterize bubblegum pop as being made by "faceless bands" assembled by an outside producer, with music written by external songwriters and producers, performed by teenagers and marketed towards pre-teens, and with a "sweet, sunny, upbeat danceable, entirely subjective bubblegum sound". The artists were typically singles acts, with songs commonly featuring sing-along choruses, seemingly childlike themes and a contrived innocence, occasionally combined with an undercurrent of sexual double entendre. Comparing bubblegum to power pop, Mojo writer Dawn Eden said: "Power pop aims for your heart and your feet. Bubblegum aims for any part of your body it can get, as long as you buy the damn record." Music critic Lester Bangs described the style as "the basic sound of rock 'n' roll – minus the rage, fear, violence and anomie".

There is debate concerning which artists fit the genre, especially for cases such as the Monkees. In the opinion of music historian Bill Pitzonka: "The whole thing that really makes a record bubblegum is just an inherently contrived innocence that somehow transcends that. [...] It has to sound like they mean it."

== Precursors ==
According to music historian Carl Caferelli, "You could conceivably think of virtually every cute novelty hit, from pre-rock ditties like 'How Much Is That Doggie In The Window' to transcendent rock-era staples like 'Iko Iko', as a legitimate precursor to bubblegum's avowedly ephemeral themes." He went on to list such "important antecedents" as "I'm Henery the Eighth, I Am" (Herman's Hermits, 1965), "Snoopy Vs. The Red Baron" (Royal Guardsmen, 1966), "Ding, Dong! The Witch is Dead" (the Fifth Estate, 1967), and "Green Tambourine" (Lemon Pipers, 1967).

== Original commercial peak (1968–1972) ==
American bubblegum pop was often like garage rock's bouncy little brother: lacking the moodiness and sex appeal, but you could see the shared DNA. British bubblegum was born out of the same talent glut of session musicians and songwriters and shared a sweet tooth, but it was quite different in approach, owing rock almost nothing and rarely placing much of a premium on kid energy.

— Tom Ewing, Freaky Trigger

Bubblegum is generally traced to the success of the 1968 songs "Simon Says" by the 1910 Fruitgum Company and "Yummy Yummy Yummy" by the Ohio Express. Tommy James of the Shondells claims to have unknowingly invented bubblegum music in 1967 with the hit song "I Think We're Alone Now". Producers Jerry Kasenetz and Jeffry Katz have claimed credit for coining "bubblegum" for this music, saying that when they discussed their target audience, they decided it was "teenagers, the young kids. And at the time we used to be chewing bubblegum, and my partner and I used to look at it and laugh and say, 'Ah, this is like bubblegum music'." The term was seized upon by Buddah Records label executive Neil Bogart, as Pitzonka added: "Kasenetz and Katz really crystallized [the scene] when they came up with the term themselves and that nice little analogy. And Neil Bogart, being the marketing person he was, just crammed it down the throats of people. That's really the point at which bubblegum took off."

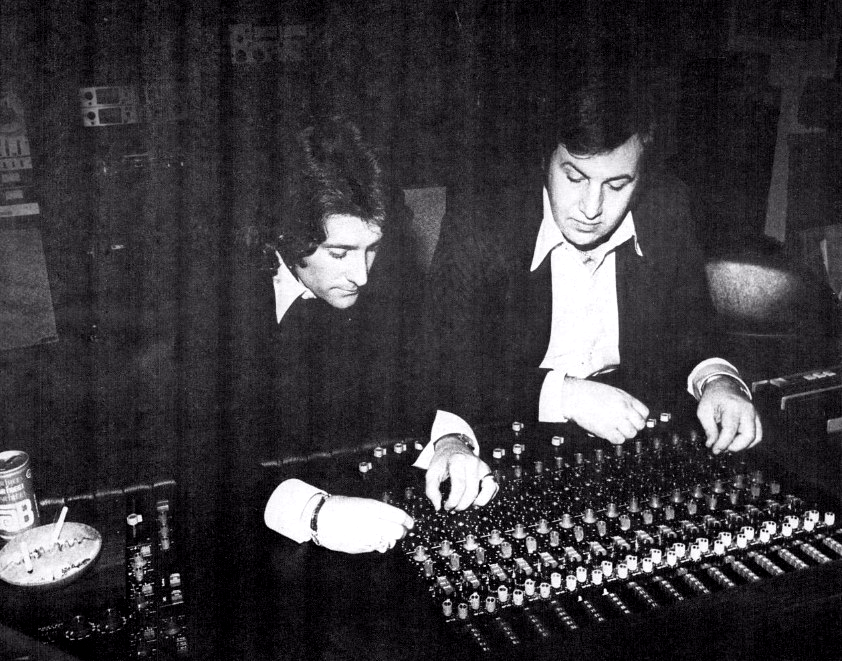
Jerry Kasenetz (left) and Jeffry Katz in 1974

The Archies' "Sugar, Sugar" became the best-selling hit of 1969 and inspired a wave of artists to adopt the bubblegum style. The song's success led to "cartoon rock", a short-lived trend of Saturday morning cartoon series that heavily featured pop-rock songs in the bubblegum vein. However, none of these songs had showings on the pop charts when released as singles, except for a record early in the year, The Banana Splits theme song "The Tra La La Song (One Banana, Two Banana)", which managed a number 96 peak on the Billboard Top 100 and number 94 on the RPM charts.

Robin Carmody of Freaky Trigger writes that British bubblegum from 1968 to 1972 was distinct from the "more worldly and sophisticated American equivalent" by being "simplistic, childish, over-excited, innocent, full of absolute certainties and safe knowledges", while noting that it "essentially bridged the gap between the poppier end of the mid-60s beat boom and glam rock".

== 1970s hits and influence ==
Most bubblegum acts were one hit wonders (notable exceptions included the Partridge Family and Tommy Roe) and the genre remained a significant commercial force until the early 1970s. Bubblegum failed to maintain its chart presence after the early 1970s due in part to changing trends in the industry. Producers such as Kasenetz and Katz subsequently pursued different musical avenues. Writing in Bubblegum Music Is the Naked Truth, Chuck Eddy offered that bubblegum evolved to be "more an attitude than a genre" during the 1970s. In the UK, bubblegum caught on in the early 1970s and fell out of popular favor by the end of the decade. In 2010, author and musician Bob Stanley summarized:

While some more confrontational music would become popular with kids – some of the more colourful rave anthems, for example – kids' music became synonymous with novelty tie-ins like Bob the Builder and Mr Blobby until the explosion in kids' music, fuelled by the cross-promotional opportunities offered by the multiplicity of kids' TV channels, led by the Wiggles and the Disney stable.

Many musicians who grew up with the genre later incorporated bubblegum influences in their work. Although it is rarely acknowledged by music critics, who typically dismissed the genre, bubblegum's simple song structures, upbeat tempos, and catchy hooks were carried into punk rock. The Ramones were the most prominent of the bubblegum-influenced punk bands, adopting cartoon personae and later covering two bubblegum standards "Little Bit O' Soul" and "Indian Giver". Pitzonka stated of bubblegum's legacy:

Bubblegum really did lay a deeper foundation than anybody's willing to give it credit for. Yes, it is responsible for Take That and New Kids On The Block, but it's also responsible for The Ramones. A lot of the melodic metal comes out of that too. Bubblegum was based in melody; it was all about the song. It was all about getting the message across in two and a half minutes. [...] And it was the perfect antidote to everything that was going on [in the late 1960s].

== Bubblegum dance ==
The term "bubblegum dance" has sometimes been used to describe music. The 1971 Osmonds song "One Bad Apple" is a prototypical example, modeled after the style of the Jackson 5. Another example is Danish-based Eurodance being labeled as such, most notably "Barbie Girl" from Aqua.

== See also ==
- Rockism and poptimism
- Yé-yé
- 1960s in music
- Pop rock
- Psychedelic pop
- Sunshine pop
- J-pop
- Euro pop

== Sources ==
- Cooper, Kim; Smay, David, eds. (2001). Bubblegum Music is the Naked Truth. Feral House. ISBN 978-0-922915-69-9.
