= Bill Bartlett (musician) =

American rock guitarist (born 1943)

- Born: 28 February 1943 (age 83); Dayton, Ohio
- Occupation: Musician
- Instrument: Guitar
- Years active: 1960s - ?
- Formerly of: Bartlett Brothers and the Country Paupers, Tony and the Bandits, The Lemon Pipers, Beachwood Farm, Starstruck, Ram Jam

Bill Bartlett (February 28, 1943) is an American rock guitarist originally from Dayton, Ohio. During his musical career, he has been a member of The Lemon Pipers, Starstruck, and Ram Jam. Both groups scored with major hits.

== Background ==
Bill Bartlett's interest in music was sparked off in the late 1950s by watching the Ranch Party show on television and seeing Collins Kids and Joe Maphis perform. Some early influences were, Elvis Presley's guitarist Scotty Moore, Ricky Nelson's guitarist James Burton and Gene Vincent's guitarist Cliff Gallup.

Bartlett is the guitarist on the hit song "Green Tambourine" by The Lemon Pipers. he would later form the group Starstruck who had a regional hit in the Ohio area with "Black Betty". Bartlett later joined the group Ram Jam who had a hit with their edited version of "Black Betty".

Bartlett was described by Allman Brothers Band and Starstruck bassist David Goldflies as "a walking school in rockabilly and acid rock.

== Career ==
=== 1960s ===
During the 1960s, Bartlett was the guitarist in the group Tony and the Bandits, a teen band from Ohio. The group comprised Bill Bartlett on guitar, Bill Albaugh on drums, and Bob Dudek on bass. In 1966, the group was expanded with R.G. Nave on keyboards. Nave had actually been in a local rival band, the Wombats. Tony and the Bandits had a minor hit with "It’s a Bit of Alright" and they appeared on the Shindig! television show. This group would be the foundation for the Lemon Pipers. They were the resident band at the Boar's Head in Oxford. They also made regular trips to the Mug Club in Cincinnati. They released a double-sided single "Quiet, Please!" in 1967 which was credited to The Lemon Pipers.

The group went to the Buddah label and released their debut single for the label which was "Turn Around and Take a Look" backed with "Danger". Both sides were composed by Bartlett. It was reported by Cash Box in the magazine's 2 September issue that the single was seeing action in Cleveland and the song had been acquired by Neil Bogart of Buddah and the group had been signed to the label on a long term contract. Karma Sutra / Buddah director of pop activities reported an excellent reaction to the record. The single was a Newcomer Pick in the 16 September issue of Cash Box where it received a positive review. The single debuted at No. 49 in the Cash Box Looking Ahead chart for the week of 23 September 1967. The single peaked at No. 21 for the week of 14 October. It was still in the chart for the week of 28 October.

With their label keen to have them in the main charts, the band was put in with songwriters, Paul Leka and Shelley Pinz. The band was given "Green Tambourine" to record. The song was a success and would get to No. 1 in the Billboard and Cash Box charts in February 1968.

With "Green Tambourine" at No. 15 in the UK Disc & Music Echo Top 30 chart for the week of 2 March 1968, the magazine published a profile of the Lemon Pipers. According to the article, Bartlett was born in South Harrow, London, England. He was also a senior in fine artis at Miami University and he had seven pet cats.

=== 1970s - 1990s ===
Barlett was a member of Starstruck. The band recorded "Black Betty" in 1975 and released it as a single on Truckstar T-1001, backed with Bartlett's own composition, "I Should Have Known". Although a hit in the Ohio locality, it was not successful outside the area.

Producers Jerry Kasenetz and Jeffry Katz realized that the "Black Betty" single had potential, however, and formed a group around Bartlett. Re-editing the Starstruck single and releasing it with "Ram Jam" as the artist in 1977, it was a hit, peaking at No. 18 on the US singles chart and making the Top 10 in other countries.

== Later years ==
According to the Cincinnati magazine, in the 2010s, Bartlett was enjoying the quiet life in the rural area of West College Corner, Indiana, and just playing guitar as a hobby.
