= Julian Lennon discography =

Julian Lennon

British musician Julian Lennon has issued many recordings since 1984. Some of his singles, such as "Too Late for Goodbyes", have reached the top position in various charts. As of August 2025, Lennon has released thirty-eight singles and seven studio albums.

== Albums ==
=== Studio albums ===
Year	Album details	Peak chart positions								Certifications
Year	Album details	UK	AUS	CAN	GER	JPN	NZ	SWE	US	Certifications
1984	Valotte	20	8	12	60	41	15	15	17	BPI: Silver; RIAA: Platinum
1986	The Secret Value of Daydreaming	93	65	22	—	—	—	25	32	RIAA: Gold
1989	Mr. Jordan	—	18	46	—	—	—	—	87	
1991	Help Yourself	42	5	—	—	—	—	—	—	ARIA: Gold
1998	Photograph Smile	78	28	—	94	70	—	—	—	
2011	Everything Changes	106	—	—	—	—	—	—	—	
2022	Jude	— (Note: "Jude" did not enter the UK Albums Chart Top 100, but peaked at number 16 on the UK Album Downloads Chart, number 20 on the UK Vinyl Albums Chart, and at number 7 on the UK Independent Albums Chart.)	—	—	54	—	—	—	—	
"—" denotes releases that did not chart.

=== Compilation albums ===
Year	Title
2001	VH-1 – Behind the Music – The Julian Lennon Collection

== Singles ==
Year	Title	Peak chart positions										Certifications	Album
Year	Title	UK	AUS	CAN	GER	IRE	NZ	SWE	US	US AC	US Rock	Certifications	Album
1984	"Too Late for Goodbyes"	6	13	6	26	5	24	17	5	1	11		Valotte
1984	"Valotte"	55	75	9	—	—	10	—	9	4	2		Valotte
1985	"Say You're Wrong"	75	31	30	—	—	—	—	21	6	3		Valotte
1985	"Jesse"	—	—	—	—	—	—	—	54	—	—		Valotte
1985	"Because"	40	66	—	—	30	—	—	—	—	—		Dave Clark's Time Soundtrack
1986	"Stick Around"	86	79	31	—	—	—	—	32	—	1		The Secret Value of Daydreaming
1986	"Time Will Teach Us All"	—	—	—	—	—	—	—	—	—	—		Dave Clark's Time Soundtrack
1986	"This Is My Day"	—	—	—	—	—	—	—	—	—	—		The Secret Value of Daydreaming
1986	"Want Your Body"	—	—	—	—	—	—	—	—	—	—		The Secret Value of Daydreaming
1986	"Midnight Smoke"	194	—	—	—	—	—	—	—	—	—		Mike Batt's The Hunting of the Snark
1989	"Now You're in Heaven"	59	5	39	—	—	—	—	93	—	1	ARIA: Gold	Mr. Jordan
1989	"You're the One"	—	68	—	—	—	—	—	—	—	—		Mr. Jordan
1989	"Mother Mary"	—	—	—	—	—	—	—	—	—	—		Mr. Jordan
1991	"Saltwater"	6	1	98	58	5	—	—	—	—	—	ARIA: Platinum	Help Yourself
1991	"Help Yourself"	53	30	—	53	—	—	—	—	—	—		Help Yourself
1991	"Rebel King"	—	—	—	—	—	—	—	—	—	—		Help Yourself
1991	"Listen"	—	—	69	—	—	—	—	—	—	31		Help Yourself
1992	"Get a Life"	56	104	—	—	—	—	—	—	—	—		Help Yourself
1993	"Children of the World"	—	—	—	—	—	—	—	—	—	—		Coo – Soundtrack
1995	"Cole's Song"	—	—	—	—	—	—	—	—	—	—		Mr. Holland's Opus – Soundtrack
1998	"All Alone" (with Bald)	—	—	—	—	—	—	—	—	—	—		Bald
1998	"Day After Day"	66	—	—	—	—	—	—	—	—	—		Photograph Smile
1998	"I Don't Wanna Know"	99	64	—	—	—	—	—	—	—	—		Photograph Smile
1998	"Photograph Smile"	—	—	—	—	—	—	—	—	—	—		Photograph Smile
2009	"Lucy"	—	—	—	—	—	—	—	—	—	—		Non-album single
2011	"Lookin' 4 Luv"	—	—	—	—	—	—	—	—	—	—		Everything Changes
2011	"Children of the World"	—	—	—	—	—	—	—	—	—	—		Shine On! Songs Volume One
2012	"Hope" (Nick Wood)	—	—	—	—	—	—	—	—	—	—		Non-album single
2012	"All That You've Wanted" (with Matt Backer)	— (Note: "All That You've Wanted" did not enter the UK Singles Chart Top 100, but peaked at number 49 on the UK Physical Singles Chart.)	—	—	—	—	—	—	—	—	—		Non-album single
2013	"Someday"	—	—	—	—	—	—	—	—	—	—		Everything Changes
2016	"Saltwater 25"	—	—	—	—	—	—	—	—	—	—		
2021	"Karma Police" (feat. Nuno Bettencourt)	—	—	—	—	—	—	—	—	—	—		Non-album singles
2022	"Lookin' 4 Love" (Cash Nyc Remix)	—	—	—	—	—	—	—	—	—	—		Non-album singles
2022	"Change"	—	—	—	—	—	—	—	—	—	—		Non-album singles
2022	"Imagine" (feat. Nuno Bettencourt)	— (Note: "Imagine" did not enter the UK Singles Chart Top 100, but debuted and peaked at number 20 on the UK Physical Singles Chart.)	—	—	—	—	—	—	—	—	—		Non-album singles
2024	"I Should Have Known" (Spike Stent Version)	—	—	—	—	—	—	—	—	—	—		Non-album singles
2025	"A New Dream" (with Gregory Darling)	—	—	—	—	—	—	—	—	—	—		Non-album singles
2025	"because..."	—	—	—	—	—	—	—	—	—	—		because... EP
2026	"4"	—	—	—	—	—	—	—	—	—	—		4 EP

== Guest appearances ==
- Dave Clark's Time: Original Soundtrack (1986)
- Mike Batt's The Hunting of the Snark (1986); vocals on song "Midnight Smoke"
- Playing For Keeps: Original Soundtrack (1986); vocals on song "Stand By Me"
- Hail! Hail! Rock 'n' Roll (1987); vocals on song "Johnny B. Goode"
- The Wonder Years: Music From the Emmy Award-Winning Show & Its Era (1989); vocals on song "Ruby Tuesday"
- Toy Matinee (1989); vocals on songs "Turn It On Salvador" and "Things She Said"
- Mr. Holland's Opus – Soundtrack (1996); co-wrote and vocals on "Cole's Song"
- Lennon... and Proud of It – A Conversation with Julian Lennon (1999)
- Hisss (Original Motion Picture Soundtrack) (2010) - co-wrote and vocals on song "Sway"
- Shine On! Songs Volume One (2011); song "Children Of The World"
- Tony Mortimer - Songs From The Suitcase album (2013); vocals on song "Rain In England"
- Summertime with Meninos do Morumbi (2014)
- Glass Tiger - 31 album (2018); vocals on song "Thin Red Line"
- Dennis DeYoung - 26 East, Volume 1 album (2020); vocals on song "To the Good Old Days"
- Karma Police feat. Nuno Bettencourt; lead vocals
