= Jude (album) =

Studio album by Julian Lennon
- Released: 9 September 2022
- Studio: The Mix Suite (South London, UK)
- Genre: Rock, pop
- Length: 46:51
- Label: BMG
- Producer: Julian Lennon; Justin Clayton

Julian Lennon chronology
Everything Changes (2011)	Jude (2022)

Singles from Jude
- 1. "Freedom" Released: 8 April 2022; 2. "Every Little Moment" Released: 8 April 2022; 3. "Save Me" Released: 22 June 2022; 4. "Breathe" Released: 22 June 2022; 5. "Lucky Ones" Released: 3 August 2022

Jude is the seventh studio album by English singer-songwriter Julian Lennon, released on 9 September 2022. The album's title is a reference to the Beatles' 1968 song "Hey Jude", written by Paul McCartney for the then five-year-old Julian.

The album was announced with the release of the singles "Freedom" and "Every Little Moment" on 8 April 2022, Lennon's 59th birthday. Two additional singles, "Save Me" and "Breathe", were released on 22 June 2022. The single "Lucky Ones" was released on 3 August 2022, and a music video for it was released on 24 October 2022. The video was directed by David Dutton and was created using artificial intelligence models Disco Diffusion and Stable Diffusion. The album cover photo of Julian as a child was taken by May Pang in 1974.

== Critical reception ==
Jacob Uitti writing for American Songwriter said the singles "Freedom" and "Every Little Moment" that were included on Jude were "poignant", offering "emotional aid in a difficult global time, as much as they give assistance to those experiencing difficult personal times internally."

For Spin, Liza Lentini praised Jude as a moving album that looks back in the name of progress.

Goldmine wrote about the release, "With his new album, the first in 11 years, Julian advances his body of work that has always simultaneously explored personal and global themes, but for the first time in his life, he's embracing his inner status as someone's son...[an] introspective masterwork from a diversely talented artist."

== Track listing ==
Jude track listing
No.	Title	Writer(s)	Length
1.	"Save Me"	Julian Lennon; Gregory Darling	3:03
2.	"Freedom"	Lennon; Tim Ellis; Grant Ransom	4:07
3.	"Every Little Moment"	Lennon; Mark Spiro	3:42
4.	"Not One Night"	Lennon; Spiro	3:52
5.	"Love Don't Let Me Down"	Lennon; Guy Chambers	4:03
6.	"Round and Round Again"	Lennon; Ellis; Ransom	4:17
7.	"Love Never Dies"	Lennon; Antony Hustings-Moore	4:00
8.	"Breathe"	Lennon; Peter-John Vettese	4:47
9.	"Lucky Ones"	Lennon; Darling; Gregg Alexander; Martijn Garritsen; Kristoffer Fogelmark; Albin Nedler; John Martin; Michel Zitron	4:41
10.	"Stay"	Lennon; Vettese	6:09
11.	"Gaia" (featuring Paul Buchanan and Elissa Lauper)	Lennon; Bill Laurance; Elissa Lauper	4:10
Total length:			46:51

== Personnel ==
Musicians

- Julian Lennon – vocals, keyboards, programming, acoustic guitar, percussion, arrangements
- Peter-John Vettese – keyboards, acoustic piano, programming
- Gregory Darling – keyboards, acoustic piano, guitars
- Tim Ellis – keyboards (2, 6), guitars (2, 6)
- Grant Ransom – keyboards (2, 6), guitars (2, 6)
- Tony Moore – acoustic piano (7)
- Bill Laurance – keyboards (11)
- Justin Clayton – electric guitar (2), bass (2)
- Charlie Corrie – acoustic guitar (7)
- John McCurry – acoustic guitar (7), electric guitar (7)
- Mark Spiro – acoustic guitar (7), backing vocals (7)
- Martijn Garritsen – guitars (9)
- Michael League – bass (1, 9)
- Leland Sklar – bass (7)
- Ash Soan – drums
- Felix Higginbottom – percussion
- Brian Byrne – string arrangements (1, 8, 11)
- Rosabella Gregory – original string arrangements (4)
- Bob Rose – original string arrangements (4)
- Bulgarian Symphony Orchestra – strings (1, 8, 10)
- Vanessa Freebairn-Smith – cello (4)
- John Zach Dellinger – viola (4)
- Neel Hammond – violin (4), string arrangements (4)
- Ben Jacobsen – violin (4)
- Oklahoma Film Orchestra – strings (11)
- Christina Giacona – string contractor (11)
- Paul Buchanan – vocals (11)
- Elissa Lauper – vocals (11)

Production

- Julian Lennon – producer, editing (1, 8, 11), production coordinator, art direction, concept, cover design
- Justin Clayton – producer, engineer (2), production coordinator
- Brian Byrne – string producer (1, 8, 11)
- Spike Stent – mixing
- Patrick Conlon – engineer (2, 11)
- Jaime Sickora – engineer (4)
- Matt Wolach – mix assistant
- Randy Merrill – mastering at Sterling Sound (New York City, New York)
- Kaylee Largay – production coordinator
- Allie Stimatze – production coordinator
- Rebecca Warfield – production coordinator, management
- David Dutton – art direction, graphic design, artwork
- Adam Brookes – graphic design, artwork
- David Becker – animated image editing
- May Pang – front cover photography
- Robert Ascroft – inside cover photography

== Charts ==
Chart performance for Jude
Chart (2022)	Peak position
Belgian Albums (Ultratop Wallonia)	140
German Albums (Offizielle Top 100)	54
Scottish Albums (OCC)	22
Swiss Albums (Schweizer Hitparade)	37
UK Album Downloads (OCC)	65
UK Independent Albums (OCC)	7

The "Lucky Ones" single debuted on the Billboard Adult Alternative Airplay chart at No. 37.
