= Everything Changes (Julian Lennon album) =

Studio album by Julian Lennon
- Released: 2 October 2011
- Studio: Sarm Studios (London, UK); Night Bird Recording Studios (West Hollywood, California)
- Genre: Rock
- Length: 57:13
- Label: Conehead
- Producer: Julian Lennon; Grant Ransom; Peter-John Vettese; Mark Spiro

Julian Lennon chronology
Behind the Music – The Julian Lennon Collection (2001)	Everything Changes (2011)	Jude (2022)

Singles from Everything Changes
- 1. "Lookin' 4 Luv" Released: 11 September 2011; 2. "Guess It Was Me (2012 Remix)" Released: 8 April 2012

Everything Changes is the sixth studio album by English singer-songwriter Julian Lennon, released on 2 October 2011.

== Background ==
Lennon has described the material as "a bit more free-flowing than [his] previous work", calling it his "favourite album so far". Revealing how Everything Changes came about, Lennon explained: "Obviously, if you sit down and play around for a bit, you’re going to come up with ideas. One thing led to another and pretty soon I had about 30 ideas, so I invited some friends to come over and flesh them out into songs".

== Release ==
Professional ratings
Review scores
Source	Rating
AllMusic	3/5 stars
Express	3/5 stars
Herald Standard	Favorable
Melodic	4.5/5 stars
Record Collector	3/5 stars
Road Trip Radio	3/5 stars
The Telegraph	2/5 stars

Everything Changes was released on 2 October 2011 on CD by Nova Sales & Distribution (UK) and Conehead; and only saw a UK/Ireland release. The album is his first since 1998's Photograph Smile. The album is set to be released on clear vinyl.

The first single from the album was "Lookin' 4 Luv", released digitally on 11 September 2011. The second single was a remix of an album track, "Guess It Was Me", released on 8 April 2012.

On 4 June 2013, the album was re-released with two additional bonus tracks: "Someday", featuring Steven Tyler and "In Between". This follows after Lennon contributed backing vocals to the Aerosmith track "LUV XXX" from the 2012 album Music from Another Dimension!. The re-release revised the track listing slightly; as opposed to placing the new tracks as the last two of the album, they were integrated into original track listing. The iTunes re-release also features an exclusive bonus 41-minute video documentary "Through The Picture Window"

In September 2014 a limited edition box set was released containing 3 CD's (the studio album, as well as an instrumental version, and an acoustic version); a DVD of the documentary noted above; a vinyl version of the studio album; and a photography booklet.

== Track listing ==
Everything Changes original 2011 edition
No.	Title	Writer(s)	Length
1.	"Everything Changes"	Julian Lennon, Pete Vettese	4:08
2.	"Lookin' 4 Luv"	Lennon, Vettese	4:12
3.	"Hold On"	Lennon, Gregory Darling	4:53
4.	"Touch the Sky"	Lennon, Vettese	4:24
5.	"Invisible"	Lennon, The Singhs, Buchanan	4:14
6.	"Just for You"	Lennon, Mark Spiro	4:20
7.	"Always"	Lennon, Justin Clayton	6:16
8.	"Disconnected"	Lennon, Vettese, Spiro	6:55
9.	"Never Let You Go"	Lennon, Guy Chambers	3:57
10.	"Guess It Was Me"	Lennon, Vettese, Ellis, Grant Ransom	3:48
11.	"Don't Wake Me Up"	Lennon, Darling	5:10
12.	"Beautiful"	Lennon, Darling	4:54

Everything Changes 2013 edition
No.	Title	Writer(s)	Length
1.	"Everything Changes"	Julian Lennon, Pete Vettese	4:08
2.	"Someday" (Feat Steven Tyler)	Lennon, Tyler, Spiro	4:25
3.	"Lookin' 4 Luv"	Lennon, Vettese	4:12
4.	"Hold On"	Lennon, Gregory Darling	4:53
5.	"Touch the Sky"	Lennon, Vettese	4:24
6.	"Invisible"	Lennon, The Singhs, Buchanan	4:14
7.	"Just for You"	Lennon, Mark Spiro	4:20
8.	"Always"	Lennon, Justin Clayton	6:16
9.	"Disconnected"	Lennon, Vettese, Spiro	6:55
10.	"Never Let You Go"	Lennon, Guy Chambers	3:57
11.	"Guess It Was Me"	Lennon, Vettese, Ellis, Grant Ransom	3:48
12.	"In Between"	Lennon, Spiro	3:48
13.	"Don't Wake Me Up"	Lennon, Darling	5:10
14.	"Beautiful"	Lennon, Darling	4:54

Notes

- "Beautiful" was previously released on Lennon's "Lucy" single in 2009.
- "Someday" and "In Between" (Produced by Julian Lennon and Mark Spiro; Engineered and Mixed by Angelo Caputo; Assistant Engineer – Mike Gaydusek for NightBird Recording Studios, West Hollywood, CA) were added to the 2013 re-release of Everything Changes. "Someday" was released as a single on 8 April 2013.

== Personnel ==
Musicians

- Julian Lennon – vocals, backing vocals, acoustic piano, Wurlitzer electric piano, keyboard programming, strings, guitars, bass, drums
- Grant Ransom – keyboards, programming, guitars, bass, drums
- Peter-John Vettese – keyboards, programming, guitars, bass, drums, backing vocals
- Gregory Darling – acoustic piano, keyboards
- Matt Backer – guitars, sitar
- Mark Evans – guitars
- Guy Chambers – guitars (10), bass (10)
- Mark Spiro – acoustic guitar (12)
- Justin Clayton – guitars (14), bass (14)
- Guy Pratt – bass
- Vanessa Fraebairn-Smith – cello
- Tim Ellis – backing vocals

"Someday"

- Julian Lennon – vocals, backing vocals
- Steven Tyler – vocals, backing vocals
- Mark Spiro – acoustic guitar, backing vocals
- Jon MacLennan – electric guitar
- Steve Sidelnyk – drum and percussion programming
- Steve Sidwell – string arrangements
- Vanessa Fraebairn-Smith – cello
- Rob Brophy – viola
- Tereza Stanislave – violin
- Alwyn Wright – violin

"Always"

- Jebin Bruni – acoustic piano, keyboards
- Paul Stanborough – programming
- David J. Carpenter – bass
- Bryan Head – drums
- Vanessa Fraebairn-Smith – cello
- Sonus Quartet – strings

== Production ==
- Julian Lennon – producer, design
- Grant Ransom – producer (1, 3–11, 13, 14)
- Peter-John Vettese – original production (1, 3, 5, 11)
- Mark Spiro – producer (2, 12)
- Jeff Rothschild – mixing (1, 3–11, 13, 14)
- Angelo Caputo – engineer (2, 12), mixing (2, 12)
- Graham Archer – mix assistant (1, 3–11, 13, 14)
- Mike Gaydusek – assistant engineer (2, 12)
- Chris Gehringer – mastering at Sterling Sound (New York City, New York)
- Ryan Art – design
