= Saltwater (Julian Lennon song) =

1991 single by Julian Lennon

Single by Julian Lennon

from the album Help Yourself
- B-side: "Rebel King"; "Cre que voy a llorar"; "Mother Mary"
- Released: 12 August 1991
- Length: 3:46
- Label: Virgin
- Songwriters: Julian Lennon; Mark Spiro; Leslie Spiro
- Producer: Bob Ezrin

Julian Lennon singles chronology
"You're the One" (1989)	"Saltwater" (1991)	"Help Yourself" (1991)

Music video
- "Saltwater" (1991) on YouTube; "Saltwater 25" on YouTube

"Saltwater" is a song by English singer-songwriter Julian Lennon. It was written by Lennon, Mark Spiro, and Leslie Spiro. Originally released on Lennon's fourth album, Help Yourself (1991), the single was released in August 1991 by Virgin Records. It peaked at number six in the United Kingdom in October 1991 and topped the Australian ARIA Singles Chart for four weeks in March 1992. "Saltwater" was the 14th-highest-selling single of 1992 in Australia, where it is certified platinum.

In 2016, Lennon rerecorded the song as "Saltwater 25" on 14 December 2016 saying that a proportion of the proceeds would go to The White Feather Foundation.

== Background ==
Unlike most of Lennon's previous songs, "Saltwater" combines subtle melodies with gentle vocals to bring forward the issues of environmental conservation and world poverty. The lyrics juxtapose many hypothetical aspects of the cosmos and alleged feats of human civilisation with the death of the natural world, constantly emphasising the passing of time — "Time is not a friend, 'cos friends we're out of time".

The recording features a lead guitar solo in the style of George Harrison. Lennon originally wrote a guitar solo for the song. At the suggestion of his producer Bob Ezrin, he then contacted Harrison to play the solo instead. Harrison was busy at the time consoling Eric Clapton whose son had recently died. He recorded a couple of riffs and sent them back to Lennon. Guitar player Steve Hunter then played the actual solo on the song, combining elements of both Lennon's and Harrison's solos. In the liner notes for the Help Yourself album, Harrison is given special thanks.

== Track listings ==
- CD single
1. "Saltwater" – 3:46
2. "Rebel King" – 4:30
3. "Cre que voy a llorar" – 4:07
4. "Mother Mary" – 4:53
- 12-inch single

A1. "Saltwater" – 4:07
B1. "Rebel King" (edit) – 4:30
B2. "Creo que voy a llorar" – 4:07

- 7-inch and cassette single

A. "Saltwater" – 3:46
B. "Rebel King" (edit) – 4:30

- Australian CD and cassette EP
1. "Saltwater"
2. "Now You're in Heaven"
3. "Too Late for Goodbyes"
4. "Say You're Wrong"
5. "Rebel King" (edit)
- Japanese mini-CD single
1. "Saltwater"
2. "Mother Mary"

== Charts ==
=== Weekly charts ===
Chart (1991–1992)	Peak position
Australia (ARIA)	1
Belgium (Ultratop 50 Flanders)	18
Canada Top Singles (RPM)	98
Europe (Eurochart Hot 100)	9
Europe (European Hit Radio)	5
Germany (GfK)	58
Ireland (IRMA)	5
Luxembourg (Radio Luxembourg)	2
Netherlands (Dutch Top 40)	15
Netherlands (Single Top 100)	15
UK Singles (Official Charts)	6
UK Airplay (Music Week)	4

=== Year-end charts ===
Chart (1991)	Position
Europe (European Hit Radio)	40
UK Singles (OCC)	41

Chart (1992)	Position
Australia (ARIA)	14

== Certifications ==
Region	Certification	Certified units/sales
Australia (ARIA)	Platinum	70,000^{^}
^{^} Shipments figures based on certification alone.

== Release history ==
Region	Date	Format(s)	Label(s)	Ref.
United Kingdom	12 August 1991	7-inch vinyl; 12-inch vinyl; CD	Virgin	
Australia	9 September 1991	12-inch vinyl; CD; cassette	Virgin	
Australia	16 September 1991	7-inch vinyl	Virgin	
Japan	21 September 1991	Mini-CD	Virgin	

== Covers ==
An instrumental version of this song was recorded by Chet Atkins and Tommy Emmanuel on their album The Day Finger Pickers Took Over the World. Anni-Frid Lyngstad from ABBA performed the song at the open-air gala concert "Artister för Miljö" and included her cover as a B-side on her single "Änglamark".

In 2023 Lennon's White Feather Foundation teamed up with Future Youth Records to record a cover version of 'Saltwater' featuring youth artists Sereena, Jenna Marie, Tausha and Hadron Sounds. The proceeds were split equally, with The White Feather Foundation's share going directly to the Save the Mirning Sea Country Campaign to help preserve critical biodiversity and protect a sacred Aboriginal culture and Future Youth Records' proceeds being used to support Gen Z artists to inspire environmental change and social justice through music.
