= Howl at the Moon (disambiguation) =

Howl at the Moon is an American piano bar franchise. Howl at the Moon or Howling at the Moon may also refer to:

- Howling

== Music ==
- Howl at the Moon, 2010 album by Danish rock band The Floor Is Made of Lava
- Howl at the Moon, 2010 album by Canadian country music singer Jamie Warren
- "Howl at the Moon", 2014 single by Stadiumx featuring Taylr Renee
- "Howl at the Moon", 2014 iTunes-only song from The Script album No Sound Without Silence
- "Howl at the Moon", song from the 2020 Indigo Girls album Look Long
- "Howlin' at the Moon", 1951 single by Hank Williams
- "Howling at the Moon (Sha-La-La)", song from the 1984 Ramones album, Too Tough to Die
- "Howling at the Moon", song from the 2016 Milow album, Modern Heart
- "Howling at the Moon", song performed by Donna Burke on the 2011 charity compilation album Shine On! Songs Volume One
- How to Howl at the Moon, a 2015 novel by Eli Easton, the first in the Howl at the Moon series

== See also ==
- "I Howl at the Moon", 1993 Urusei Yatsura OVA release
- Bark at the Moon, 1983 album by Ozzy Osbourne
- Howlin' at the Halloween Moon, 1989 live album by The Del-Lords
- Wolf communication, noting that contrary to popular belief, wolves do not howl at the Moon
- Howling
