= Now You're in Heaven =

1989 single by Julian Lennon

Single by Julian Lennon

from the album Mr. Jordan
- B-side: "Second Time"
- Released: 20 February 1989
- Studio: Johnny Yuma Recording (Los Angeles)
- Length: 3:38
- Label: Virgin
- Songwriters: Julian Lennon, John McCurry
- Producer: Patrick Leonard

Julian Lennon singles chronology
"Midnight Smoke" (1986)	"Now You're in Heaven" (1989)	"You're the One" (1989)

"Now You're in Heaven" is a song written by Julian Lennon and John McCurry, recorded by Lennon and released as the lead single from his third studio album, Mr. Jordan (1989), on which the song appears as the opening track. A David Bowie-inspired song, it was the highest-charting single released from the album, topping the US Billboard Album Rock Tracks chart and reaching No. 5 in Australia. It was certified gold in the latter country by the Australian Recording Industry Association (ARIA) for shipments of over 35,000 units.

== Background and recording ==
"Now You're in Heaven" was recorded at the Johnny Yuma Recording studio in Los Angeles, California. It was produced by Patrick Leonard, who also performed keyboards and programmed drums on the track. The song along with the album was mixed at Skip Saylor Recording studios and mastered at Precision Mastering in Los Angeles.

The song features guitars inspired by hard rock of the early-1970s and marked a shift in Julian Lennon's musical style from mainstream pop to heavier rock. Lennon's deep vocals drew comparisons to David Bowie, whilst the guitars drew comparisons to the Who.

The song contains a dialogue sample of actor Robert Montgomery as Joe Pendleton in the film Here Comes Mr. Jordan (1941), for which the album Mr. Jordan is named. The line is "I've never seen anything as beautiful as that, even in heaven."

== Release ==
"Now You're in Heaven" was first released as the lead single from Mr. Jordan on 20 February 1989 in the United Kingdom by Virgin Records; in the United States, it was released through Atlantic Records. The single was released in 12-inch, 7-inch, CD, and cassette format internationally. The European CD single includes a re-release of Lennon's 1984 hit "Too Late for Goodbyes", originally from his debut album, Valotte. The cover art for the single was photographed by Timothy White.

William Orbit produced a house remix of the song for its US 12-inch single release, known as the "In Orbit Mix"; a more rock-based remix by Orbit was released on the European CD single release with the subtitle "Orbit Mix". The B-side to the single in most releases is "Second Time", a song co-written by Justin Clayton and Lennon and featuring guest musician Peter Frampton on guitar. The Mexican promotional 7-inch vinyl contains "Angillette", written by Lennon and John McCurry, a ballad in which the narrator addresses his suicidal lover.

== Reception ==
In People, the reviewers wrote of the track that it "swaggers while it rocks. It's a song with a cocky gunslinger's attitude". Cash Box called it "a tough-edged rocker goes for the jugular, a departure for Lennon."

== Music video ==
A music video was produced for "Now You're in Heaven" to promote the album, directed by Tony Kaye and filmed in London. It features Julian Lennon as a ventriloquist, singing the song with a dummy for a scarcely-populated theatre, whose patrons show signs of boredom and are falling asleep. After the performance, Lennon sits in the now empty theatre and applauds himself.

== Track listings ==
All tracks were produced by Patrick Leonard unless otherwise noted.

7-inch single, US cassette single, and Japanese mini-CD single

1. "Now You're in Heaven" – 3:38
2. "Second Time" – 5:14

UK 12-inch single

A1. "Now You're in Heaven" (Orbit mix)
B1. "Now You're in Heaven" (7-inch mix)
B2. "Second Time"

UK mini-CD single and European CD single

1. "Now You're in Heaven" – 3:38
2. "Too Late for Goodbyes" – 3:33 (produced by Phil Ramone)
3. "Now You're in Heaven" (Orbit mix) – 8:40 (produced by William Orbit)

US 12-inch single

1. "Now You're in Heaven" (In Orbit mix) – 8:45 (produced by William Orbit)
2. "Now You're in Heaven" (LP version) – 3:37
3. "Now You're in Heaven" (Guerilla dub) – 6:57 (produced by William Orbit)
4. "Second Time" – 5:14

Australian cassette single

A1. "Now You're in Heaven"
A2. "Second Time"
B1. "Now You're in Heaven" (Orbit mix)
B2. "Second Time"

== Personnel ==
- Julian Lennon – lead vocals, backing vocals, keyboards
- Patrick Leonard – keyboards, drum programming, production
- Jai Winding – keyboards
- Justin Clayton – guitar
- John McCurry – guitar
- Schuyler Deale – bass guitar
- Jonathan Moffett – drums
- Luis Conte – percussion
- Fee Waybill – backing vocals

== Charts ==
=== Weekly charts ===
Chart (1989)	Peak position
Australia (ARIA)	5
Canada Top Singles (RPM)	39
UK Singles (Official Charts)	59
US Billboard Hot 100	93
US Alternative Airplay (Billboard)	27
US Dance Club Songs (Billboard)	12
US Dance Singles Sales (Billboard)	42
US Mainstream Rock (Billboard)	1

=== Year-end charts ===
Chart (1989)	Position
Australia (ARIA)	42
US Album Rock Tracks (Billboard)	41

== Certifications ==
Region	Certification	Certified units/sales
Australia (ARIA)	Gold	35,000^{^}
^{^} Shipments figures based on certification alone.
