= Children of the World (disambiguation) =

Children of the World is a 1976 album by the Bee Gees.

Children of the World may also refer to:

- Children of the World (Stan Getz album), an album by saxophonist Stan Getz
- "Children Of The World", a song by Julian Lennon
- Children's Everywhere, also known as Children of the World, a Swedish photo book series by Anna Riwkin-Brick
