= Harmony (Anne Murray album) =

Studio album by Anne Murray
- Released: 1987
- Studios: D.I Musikstudio Kristian Schultze and Paradise Studio (Munich, Germany); Eastern Sound and Manta Sound (Toronto, Ontario, Canada); Image Recording Studios (Los Angeles, California, USA)
- Genre: Country
- Length: 40:09
- Label: Capitol
- Producers: Jack White; Mark Spiro

Anne Murray chronology
Something to Talk About (1986)	Harmony (1987)	As I Am (1988)

Singles from Harmony
- 1. "Are You Still in Love with Me" Released: May 1987; 2. "Anyone Can Do the Heartbreak" Released: September 1987; 3. "Perfect Strangers" Released: 1988

Harmony is the twenty-third studio album by Canadian country pop artist Anne Murray. It was released by Capitol Records in the summer of 1987.

The disc peaked at number 9 on the Billboard Top Country Albums chart and sold approximately 350,000 copies in the United States.

== Track listing ==
No.	Title	Writer(s)	Length
1.	"Are You Still in Love with Me"	Jack White, K. C. Porter, Mark Spiro	4:21
2.	"Anyone Can Do the Heartbreak"	Amanda McBroom, Tom Snow	4:00
3.	"The Great Divide"	J. D. Martin, Gary Harrison	3:44
4.	"Tonight (I Want to Be in Love)"	Marti Sharron, Albert Hammond, Peter Rafelson	4:09
5.	"Perfect Strangers" (featuring Doug Mallory)	Jonas Fjeld, Astor Anderson, Johnny Sareussen, M. Spiro	4:17
6.	"Give Me Your Love"	M. Spiro, Leslie Spiro, Porter	4:16
7.	"It Happens All the Time"	Van Stephenson, Bob Farrell, Dave Robbins	4:20
8.	"Harmony"	M. Spiro, Tony Marty, White	3:21
9.	"Natural Love"	Snow, Cynthia Weil	3:41
10.	"Without You"	White, M. Spiro	4:00

== Personnel ==
- Anne Murray – lead vocals, backing vocals
- Robbie Buchanan – pianos
- Kristian Schultze – keyboards, synthesizers, programming, bass, electronic drums, arrangements (1–8)
- Mark Spiro – keyboards, synthesizers, programming, bass, electronic drums, arrangements
- K. C. Porter – additional synthesizers
- Uva Schikora – additional synthesizers
- Dann Huff – electric guitars, acoustic guitars
- Bob Mann – additional guitars (2)
- Paulinho da Costa – percussion (9)
- Marc Russo – saxophones (9)
- Bill Reichenbach Jr. – trombone (9)
- Gary Grant – trumpet (9)
- Jerry Hey – trumpet (9), horn arrangements (9)
- Ed Arkin – arrangements (10)
- Debbie Greimann – backing vocals
- Bruce Murray – backing vocals
- Joe Pizzulo – backing vocals
- Doug Mallory – lead vocals (5)

== Production ==
- Balmur Ltd. – executive producers, management
- Jack White – producer
- Mark Spiro – associate producer
- Kristian Schultze – engineer
- Jon Van Nest – engineer
- Ken Friesen – lead vocal recording, mixing
- Jürgen Koppers – mixing
- Jan Krause – assistant engineer
- Stephen Krause – assistant engineer
- Scott Purdy – assistant engineer
- Rick Starks – assistant engineer
- Brian Gardner – mastering at Bernie Grundman Mastering (Hollywood, California, USA)
- Paul Cade – art direction, design
- Shin Sugino – photography
- Lee Kinoshita-Bevington – wardrobe design
- Sheila Yakimov – hair stylist
- George Abbott – make-up
- Leonard T. Rambeau – management

== Chart performance ==
Chart (1987)	Peak position
Canadian RPM Top Albums	45
Australia (Kent Music Report)	82
U.S. Billboard Top Country Albums	9
U.S. Billboard 200	149
