= Perfect Strangers (Anne Murray song) =

Single by Anne Murray

from the album Harmony
- Released: 1988
- Genre: Pop
- Label: Capitol Records
- Songwriter(s): Jonas Fjeld, Astor Anderson, Johnny Sareussen, Mark Spiro

Anne Murray singles chronology
"Anyone Can Do the Heartbreak" (1987)	"Perfect Strangers" (1988)	"Flying on Your Own" (1988)

"Perfect Strangers" is a song written by Jonas Fjeld, Astor Anderson, Johnny Sareussen, and Mark Spiro. It was performed by Anne Murray and Doug Mallory. The song reached No. 19 on the Canadian Adult Contemporary chart and No. 52 on the U.S. country singles chart in 1988. The song appeared on Murray's 1987 album, Harmony.

== Charts ==
Chart (1988)	Peak position
Canadian RPM Adult Contemporary	19
U.S. Country	52
