= Stick Around =

Stick Around may refer to:

- Stick Around (film)
- Stick Around (TV pilot), an unsold television pilot for ABC, starring Andy Kaufman
- Stick Around (song), a song by Julian Lennon
- Stick Around, a song by AC/DC from the album High Voltage
- Stick Around, a song by Nik Kershaw from the album 15 Minutes
- Stick Around, a song by Lukas Graham from the album 3 (The Purple Album)

== See also ==
- Stickin' Around
