= Help Yourself (Julian Lennon album) =

Studio album by Julian Lennon
- Released: 20 August 1991
- Studio: The Enterprise (Burbank, California); Amigo Studios (North Hollywood, California)
- Genre: Pop
- Length: 58:22
- Label: Virgin (UK); Atlantic (US)
- Producer: Bob Ezrin

Julian Lennon chronology
Mr. Jordan (1989)	Help Yourself (1991)	Photograph Smile (1998)

Singles from Help Yourself
- 1. "Saltwater" Released: 12 August 1991; 2. "Help Yourself" Released: 14 October 1991; 3. "Get a Life" Released: 6 April 1992

Help Yourself is the fourth studio album by English singer-songwriter Julian Lennon, released in 1991 through Atlantic Records in the US and Virgin Records in the UK.

Professional ratings
Review scores
Source	Rating
Allmusic	3/5 stars
Chicago Tribune	1/4 stars
Rolling Stone	4/5 stars

The album was a commercial success in Europe for Lennon, spawning a UK No. 6 hit "Saltwater" (as well as topping the charts in Australia for four weeks); however, it did not do as well in the US, where Atlantic Records were said to have under-promoted the album.

The album was reissued, along with The Secret Value of Daydreaming and Mr. Jordan, on 8 September 2009 by Noble Rot Records.

== Track listing ==
Side one

1. "Rebel King" (Julian Lennon, Anthony Moore, Bob Ezrin) – 5:51
2. "Saltwater" (Lennon, Mark Spiro, Leslie Spiro) – 4:07
3. "Get a Life" (Lennon, Glenn Martin Tilbrook, Scott Humphrey) – 4:17
4. "Would You" (Lennon, Moore) – 6:19
5. "Maybe I Was Wrong" (Lennon, Justin Clayton) – 4:27
6. "Help Yourself" (Lennon, John McCurry) – 4:41

Side two

7. "Listen" (Lennon) – 5:04
8. "Other Side of Town" (Lennon, Paul Buchanan, Robert Bell) – 5:34
9. "New Physics Rant" (Lennon, Moore, Ezrin, Humphrey) – 4:48
10. "Take Me Home" (Lennon, Ezrin, Clayton) – 4:26
11. "Imaginary Lines" (Lennon, Moore, Clayton, Ezrin) – 5:12
12. "Keep the People Working" (Moore) – 3:36

== Personnel ==
=== Musicians ===
- Julian Lennon – lead vocals, backing vocals, keyboards, guitars, mandolin, bass and drum programming, percussion
- Bob Ezrin – keyboards, programming, percussion, backing vocals
- Scott Humphrey – keyboards, synthesizer programming, computer programming, backing vocals
- John Haeny – sound effects
- Justin Clayton – guitars
- Steve Hunter – guitars
- John McCurry – guitars
- George Harrison – guitars [uncredited, disputed]
- Matt Bissonette – bass guitar
- Louis Molino – drums
- Allan Schwartzberg – additional drums
- Bobbye Hall – percussion
- Paul Buchanan – lead vocals (8)
- Maxi Anderson – backing vocals
- Kim Edwards-Brown – backing vocals
- Peter Fletcher – backing vocals
- Clydene Jackson – backing vocals
- Bobette Jamison-Harrison – backing vocals
- Carmen Twillie – backing vocals
- Clarise Wilkins – backing vocals
- Paul Winger – backing vocals
- Olivia D'Abo – additional backing vocals
- Mark Spiro – additional backing vocals
- San Fernando Valley Girl Scout Troop 592 – additional backing vocals

=== Production ===
- Bob Ezrin – producer
- Lenny Derose – recording
- James Guthrie – mixing
- Martin Horenburg – recording assistant, mix assistant
- Marko Olson – recording assistant
- Robert Hrycyna – production supervisor, technical supervisor
- Doug Sax – mastering at The Mastering Lab (Hollywood, California)
- PhD – art direction, design
- Mark Hanauer – photography
- Tony Smith – management
- Paddy Spinks – management

== Charts ==
=== Weekly charts ===
Chart (1991)	Position
Australian ARIA Album Chart	5
UK Albums Chart	42

=== Certifications ===
Region	Certification	Certified units/sales
Australia (ARIA)	Gold	35,000^{^}
^{^} Shipments figures based on certification alone.
