= Someday (Julian Lennon song) =

Single by Julian Lennon
- Released: 8 April 2013
- Recorded: June–July 2012
- Genre: Rock
- Length: 4:36
- Songwriters: Julian Lennon, Steven Tyler, Mark Spiro

Julian Lennon singles chronology
"All That You've Wanted" (2012)	"Someday" (2013)

"Someday" is a song by Julian Lennon, released exclusively on iTunes on 8 April 2013, Lennon's birthday. The track was added to the 2013 re-release of 2011's Everything Changes. The song includes lyrics from The Beatles' "Baby, You're a Rich Man".

== History ==
Lennon said in early June that he was going to be writing with Steven Tyler. A few days after that statement Lennon said that he was recording "Someday", which was "written the previous Friday". In a Facebook post date July 2012, Lennon said that mixing for the song, and another song "In Between", was completed.

"Someday" performed by

- Vocals: Julian Lennon & Steven Tyler
- Backing Vocals: Julian Lennon, Steven Tyler & Mark Spiro
- Mark Spiro - Acoustic guitar
- Steve Sidelnyk - Drum, percussion programming
- Jon MacLennan - Electric guitar
- Steve Sidewell - String arrangements
- Vanessa Fraebairn-Smith - Cello
- Tereza Stanislave - Violin
- Alwyn Wright - Violin
- Rob Brophy - Viola
