= Castle Rat =

American doom metal band

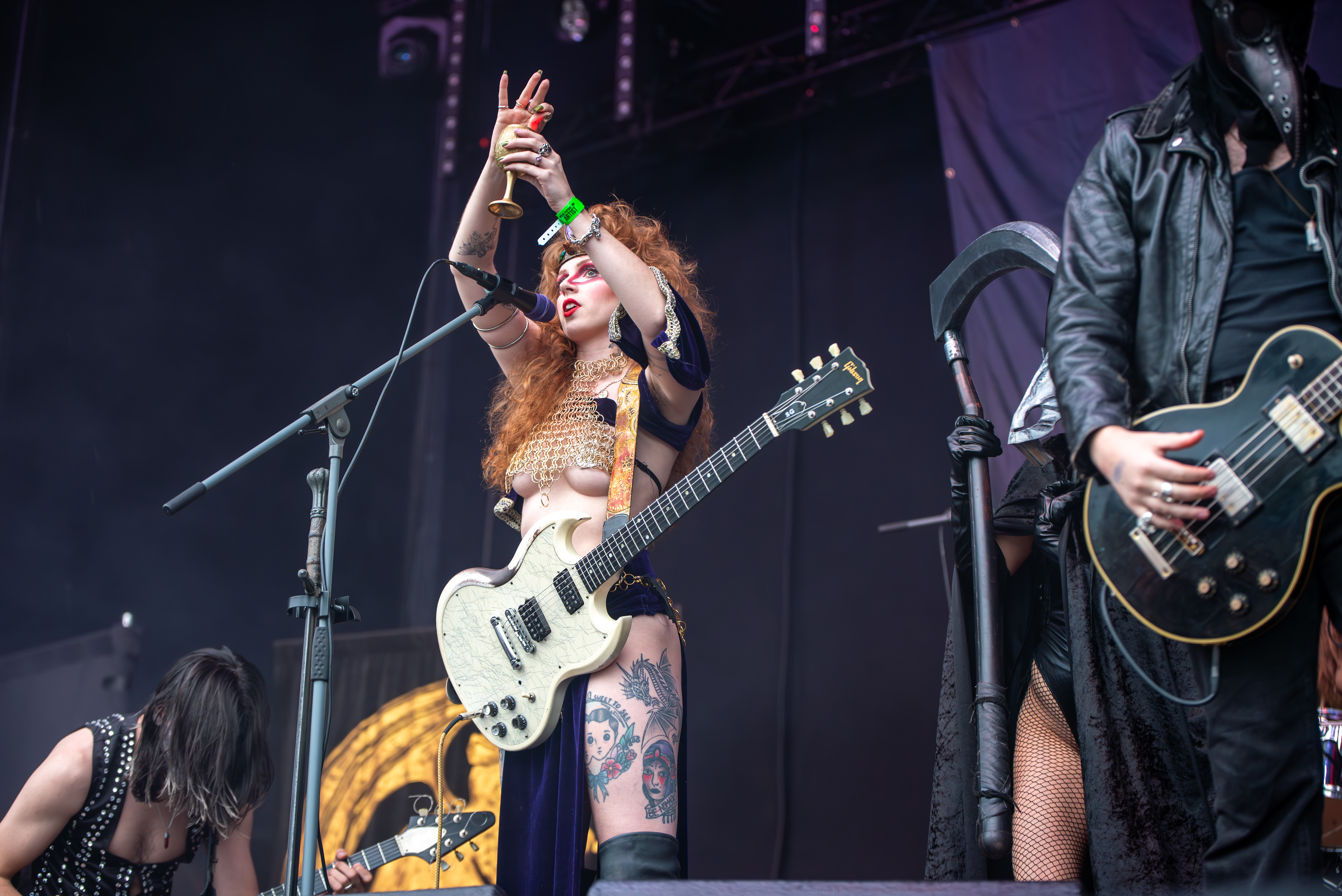
- Castle Rat performing at the Mystic Festival 2025.

Background information
- Origin: Brooklyn, New York, U.S.
- Genres: Doom metal, Heavy metal
- Years active: 2019–present
- Label: King Volume Records
- Members: Riley Pinkerton; Franco Vittore; Charley Ruddell; Joshua Strmic
- Past members: Henry Black; Ronnie Lanzilotta
- Website: castlerat.com

Castle Rat is an American doom metal band formed in Brooklyn, New York, in 2019. Known for their "medieval fantasy doom metal" aesthetic, they blend traditional doom and heavy metal with theatrical live performances inspired by Black Sabbath and Frank Frazetta's fantasy artwork. Led by vocalist and rhythm guitarist Riley Pinkerton ("The Rat Queen"), the band gained recognition for their debut album Into the Realm (2024) and elaborate stage shows featuring their nemesis, "The Rat Reaperess".

== History ==
=== Formation and early years (2019–2022) ===
Castle Rat was formed in October 2019 in Brooklyn, New York, by Riley Pinkerton (vocals, rhythm guitar - daughter of noted 1980s session guitarist John McCurry), Henry Black (lead guitar), Ronnie Lanzilotta (bass), and Joshua Strmic (drums). They debuted live on August 15, 2019, at Sunnyvale in Brooklyn, performing with bands like The Silk War and Turbo Goth. Each member adopted a fantasy persona: Pinkerton as "The Rat Queen," Black as "The Count," Lanzilotta as "The Plague Doctor," and Strmic as "The Druid," with Madeline Wright portraying "The Rat Reaperess" on stage. In 2022, they released their first single, "Feed the Dream," recorded in an abandoned Philadelphia church, premiering via Revolver magazine. They performed at The Great Rat Summoning, a Halloween event at The Sultan Room with Evolfo and Wine Lips.

=== Into the Realm and rising popularity (2023–2024) ===
In 2023, Castle Rat toured the American Southwest, supporting acts like Monolord and Firebreather, and performed at Desertfest NYC alongside Melvins and Boris. Franco Vittore replaced Henry Black as lead guitarist, and Charley Ruddell replaced Ronnie Lanzilotta as bassist. On April 12, 2024, they released their debut album, Into the Realm, through King Volume Records, featuring tracks like "Dagger Dragger," "Fresh Fur," and "Cry for Me." Recorded in a Philadelphia church with engineers Davis Shubs and Thomas Johnsen, the album topped Bandcamp's hard rock chart and was praised for its Black Sabbath-inspired sound.

=== Second album and touring (2025–present) ===
In January 2025, Castle Rat launched a Kickstarter campaign, raising $139,000 in 37 minutes for their second album, The Bestiary, set for release on September 19, 2025, through King Volume Records and Blues Funeral Recordings. Recorded by Randall Dunn and mixed by Jonathan Nuñez, the album features 13 tracks of mystical creature-themed heavy metal, centered around a wizard character. They embarked on a U.S. headlining tour in March 2025, performing at venues like Reggies Chicago and Le Poisson Rouge, and announced a European tour with stops at Desertfest, Hellfest, and Copenhell. In May 2025, they played at La Boule Noire in Paris, supported by Witchorious. Their live shows feature choreographed battle scenes and elaborate costumes. The Bestiary debuted at #11 in the UK's official rock & metal albums chart. The band was the subject of Decibel Magazine's October 2025's cover story.

The Bestiary was considered one of the 15 best metal albums of 2025 by Rolling Stone, placed #11.

In 2026, they opened for the AmonKlok tour (Amon Amarth and Dethklok).

== Musical style and themes ==
Castle Rat blends doom metal, heavy metal, and stoner metal, drawing from Black Sabbath, Witchfinder General, and Jefferson Airplane. Their medieval fantasy themes, inspired by Frank Frazetta, center on a fictional "Realm" where they battle "The Rat Reaperess." Pinkerton's vocals, likened to Grace Slick, complement theatrical performances with costumes and props like swords. Pinkerton has expressed the desire to ride out on a unicorn, similar to Rob Halford from Judas Priest's motorcycle entrance.

== Members ==
=== Current members ===
- Riley Pinkerton ("The Rat Queen") – lead vocals, rhythm guitar (2019–present)
- Franco Vittore ("The Count") – lead guitar, backing vocals (2023–present)
- Charley Ruddell ("The Plague Doctor") – bass (2024–present)
- Joshua Strmic ("The Druid") – drums (2019–present)

=== Cast members ===
- Madeline Wright ("The Rat Reaperess") – stage performer (2019–present)

=== Past members ===
- Henry Black ("The Count") – lead guitar, backing vocals (2019–2023)
- Ronnie Lanzilotta ("The Plague Doctor") – bass (2021–2024)

== Discography ==
=== Studio albums ===
- Into the Realm (2024, King Volume Records)
- The Bestiary (2025, King Volume Records/Blues Funeral Recordings)

=== Singles ===
- "Feed the Dream" (2022)
- "Fresh Fur" (2024)
- "Dagger Dragger" (2024)
- "Cry for Me" (2024)
- "Wizard" (2025)
- "Wolf I" (2025)
- "Serpent" (2025)
- "SIREN" (2026)
