= Mr. Jordan =

Studio album by Julian Lennon
- Released: 10 March 1989
- Recorded: 1989
- Studios: Johnny Yuma Recording and Skip Saylor Recording (Los Angeles, California)
- Genres: Rock, pop
- Length: 48:26
- Labels: Virgin (UK); Atlantic (US)
- Producer: Patrick Leonard

Julian Lennon chronology
The Secret Value of Daydreaming (1986)	Mr. Jordan (1989)	Help Yourself (1991)

Singles from Mr. Jordan
- 1. "Now You're in Heaven" Released: 20 February 1989; 2. "You're the One" Released: 26 June 1989

Mr. Jordan is the third studio album by English singer-songwriter Julian Lennon, released in 1989. It was Lennon's first album in three years, after taking a hiatus from the music industry.

== Release ==
Professional ratings
Review scores
Source	Rating
AllMusic	2/5 stars
Chicago Tribune	3/4 stars
Los Angeles Times	1/5 stars
People	(Positive)
Rolling Stone	3/5 stars

It was released in March 1989 on Virgin Records. The album title is a reference to the film Here Comes Mr. Jordan (1941).

The album did poorly in the album charts, but the lead single, the David Bowie sounding "Now You're in Heaven", reached number one on the Billboard Album Rock Tracks chart and was a hit in Australia.

Cash Box said that "Lennon explores his lower vocal range" in the single "You're the One."

The album was reissued, along with The Secret Value of Daydreaming and Help Yourself, on 8 September 2009 by Noble Rot Records.

== Track listing ==
All songs written by Julian Lennon and John McCurry, except where noted.

Side one

1. "Now You're In Heaven" – 3:39
2. "You're the One" – 5:52
3. "I Get Up" – 4:38
4. "Mother Mary" (Lennon) – 4:56
5. "Angillette" – 4:23

Side two

6. "Open Your Eyes" (Lennon) – 4:22
7. "Make It Up to You" (Lennon, Patrick Leonard) – 4:46
8. "Sunday Morning" (Lennon) – 3:27
9. "Second Time" (Justin Clayton, Lennon) – 5:14
10. "I Want You to Know" – 5:45
11. "Johnny B. Goode" (Berry) – 1:24
  - Unlisted track, appearing as Track 11 on European CD pressings.

== Personnel ==
=== Musicians ===
- Julian Lennon – lead vocals, backing vocals (1, 2, 4–6, 8–10), keyboards (1–4, 6–10), acoustic piano (5)
- Patrick Leonard – keyboards (1–4, 6–10), drum programming (1), synthesizers (5), Hammond B3 organ (7, 9), Yamaha CP-70 electric grand piano (9)
- Jai Winding – keyboards (1–3, 7, 9, 10)
- Justin Clayton – guitars (1–3, 7, 9, 10), lead guitar (4)
- John McCurry – guitars (1, 3–5, 9), guitar solo (2, 7, 10)
- Dann Huff – guitars (2, 6, 10)
- David Williams – backing vocals (2), guitars (6)
- David Daniels – guitars (6)
- Bruce Gaitsch – acoustic guitar (8, 9)
- Peter Frampton – guitar solo (9), backing vocals (9)
- Schuyler Deale – bass (1–3, 7, 9, 10)
- Jonathan Moffett – drums (1–4, 6, 7, 9, 10), backing vocals (2)
- Luis Conte – percussion (1, 4, 9, 10)
- Vinnie Colaiuta – brushes (3)
- Warren Ham – harmonica solo (3)
- Frank Elmo – saxophone (3, 7, 10)
- Chuck Findley – trumpet (3, 8)
- Larry Corbett – cello (4, 6)
- Suzie Katayama – cello (4, 6)
- Daniel Smith – cello (4, 6)
- John Yoakum – English horn (8)
- Fee Waybill – backing vocals (1, 6, 10)
- Alexandra Brown – backing vocals (3, 7)
- Carmen Carter – backing vocals (3, 7)
- Niki Haris – backing vocals (3, 6, 7, 9, 10)
- Donna De Lory – backing vocals (6)
- Fiona Flanagan – backing vocals (6, 9, 10)
- Marilyn Martin – backing vocals (6)
- Timothy B. Schmit – backing vocals (9)

=== Production ===
- Patrick Leonard – producer
- Brian Malouf – engineer, mixing
- Greg Droman – assistant engineer
- Ian Eales – assistant engineer
- Rick Holbrook – assistant engineer
- Patrick MacDougall – assistant engineer
- Michael Vail Blum – assistant engineer
- Stephen Marcussen – mastering at Precision Mastering (Hollywood, California)
- John Good – drum technician
- Ivy Skoff – production manager
- Bob Defrin – art direction
- Mark English – artwork
- Julian Lennon – design concept
- Timothy White – photography
- Tony Smith – management
- Patrick "Paddy" Spinks – management

== Music videos ==
- "Now You're In Heaven" – The first single and video made to promote Mr. Jordan. The song became a hit on the Album Rock chart in the US where it hit number 1.
- "You're the One" – The second single and last video to be made to promote Mr. Jordan. The single failed to chart, but the "Radio Mix" differs from the album version.

== Chart positions ==
Chart (1989)	Position
Australian ARIA Albums Chart	18
Canadian RPM Albums Chart	46
U.S. Billboard 200	87
