= Stick Around (song) =

1986 single by Julian Lennon

Single by Julian Lennon

from the album The Secret Value of Daydreaming
- B-side: "Always Think Twice"
- Released: 3 March 1986 (US); 10 March 1986 (UK)
- Recorded: 1986
- Genre: Synth-pop, pop rock, new wave
- Length: 4.03
- Label: Charisma (UK); Atlantic (US)
- Songwriter: Julian Lennon
- Producer: Phil Ramone

Julian Lennon singles chronology
"Because" (1985)	"Stick Around" (1986)	"This Is My Day" (1986)

Music video
- "Stick Around" on YouTube

"Stick Around" is the first and lead single from Julian Lennon's 1986 second album The Secret Value of Daydreaming. The song was released at a time when Lennon's solo career was at its peak, following his success with the debut album Valotte (1984).

It was a No. 1 hit on Billboard's Mainstream Rock and No. 32 on their Hot 100 chart, but only reached No. 86 in the UK Singles Chart. The song was also a minor hit in several countries around the world: Belgium (No. 21), Australia (No. 79) and Canada (No. 31).

== Background and writing ==
The expression “stick around” is a popular English idiom used to describe staying somewhere and waiting for someone or something to happen. Lennon composed the song between late 1985 and early 1986 with this lyrical context, to describe a man with couple problems waiting for a possible apology from his girlfriend "to stay" and continue the romantic relationship, although it is unknown what inspired his sentiments.

“Stick Around" features a distinctive synthesizer line as its primary sound, as well a powerful guitar riff played by Lennon's close friend and bandmate Justin Clayton. Although the song is fully credited to Lennon, Clayton had an important role in completing its composition. About this, Lennon said:

"Justin sat down and just listened to it over and over again." Lennon, who started going back and forth with the guitarist, eventually came up with the recurring line 'if you wanna' bit of the song. Unfortunately, Lennon wasn’t recording their efforts. "I didn’t tape it. ‘What was it again? I can’t lose it!’ But I forgot one bit, and he [Justin] reminded me, so I finally got it together. If he hadn't been there, it would’ve been half a song at the moment".

== Reception ==
Cash Box compared it to the songs on Valotte, saying it's a "slightly harder-edged, but melodic effort." Billboard called it a "downtempo rocker."

== Music video ==
"Stick Around" is notable for its funny and original music video, directed by Jerry Kramer (especially known for his work on Michael Jackson's anthology musical film Moonwalker) and Douglas Martin, which was widely aired on MTV in that time.

It shows Julian Lennon sitting in his apartment while his girlfriend is leaving him. After she's gone, many people enter and leave in short scenes in a video played at high speed. He has three different love relationships with continuous changes of furniture and decor through the course of several days. At the end, Lennon's girlfriend returns home and they reconcile.

It was relatively star-packed, featuring brief appearances from Michael J. Fox, Joe Piscopo, Martin Kove, Playboy playmate Peggy McIntaggart and Jami Gertz, who plays Lennon's apparently long-suffering girlfriend in the opening and closing moments of the video.

== Track listing ==
7" Single

1. "Stick Around" – 4:03
2. "Always Think Twice" – 3:57

12" Maxi Single

1. "Stick Around" (Extended) – 6:08
2. "Stick Around" (Single) – 4:01
3. "Always Think Twice" – 3:54

== Personnel ==
Musicians

- Julian Lennon – Lead vocals, Background vocals, Keyboards
- Justin Clayton – Guitar, Talk box
- Carmine Rojas – Bass
- Alan Childs – Drums

Production and engineering

- Phil Ramone – Producer
- Bradshaw Leigh – Engineer

== Charts ==
Chart (1986)	Peak position
Belgium (Ultratop Flanders)	21
Canada RPM Top Singles	31
UK (UK Singles Chart)	86
US Billboard Hot 100	32
US Mainstream Rock (Billboard)	1
