= Shine On! Songs Volume One =

Studio album by Various artists
- Released: 30 September 2011
- Recorded: 2011
- Studio: Capitol (Hollywood)
- Genre: Pop
- Length: 48:26
- Label: S.O.S Japan, Capitol
- Producer: Dan Savant; Nick Wood; Rob Chiarelli & Michael Becker

Shine On! Songs Volume One is a charity compilation album by various artists including Maxi Priest, Tierney Sutton, Julian Lennon, Rie fu, Mark Ballas, Monday Michiru, Donna Burke and others which was released 30 September 2011, in support of the Tyler Foundation for childhood cancer in Japan and December 2011, internationally via iTunes Store. The album received support worldwide and media attention in Japan and elsewhere that included Yahoo! News, The Dallas Morning News and Rolling Stone.

== History ==
The album was recorded both in the United States at Capitol Studios and also in Japan. Shine On! Songs Volume One was a brainchild of the Tyler Foundation which created the musical collaboration as a way of raising funds for the organizations programs. A number of artists donated songs to the album including Julian Lennon who donated 'Children of the World' to be a track on the album. It was also announced on Mark Ballas and several other contributing artists websites in late 2011.

Rolling Stone first reported that Julian Lennon was donating his 1993 song 'Children of the World' to be a track on the album. However, one issue that received public attention was Julian Lennon's criticism of an Examiner.com article after publishing several details wrong. Lennon blasted the journalist responsible on both his website and Facebook page until the article was corrected.

During production students at Sakari Elementary School in Ofunato City, Japan participated in the chorus of one of the songs on the CD, "Who I Want to Be". The song is based on an English version of Miyazawa Kenji's famous poem "Ame Ni Mo Makezu". Recording artist Rie fu, who sang the song, visited Sakari Elementary school to share in the happiness of completing the song.

"Children of the World" was also released on the soundtrack for the Japanese animated film Coo. Producer Nick Wood liked it so much, he revived it for this album.

== Reception ==
Professional ratings
Review scores
Source	Rating
Yahoo! Music	(6.0/10)

Critical reaction to the album was low from the overall music industry. Nevertheless, several reviewers including those from Yahoo! Music spoke positively about Julian Lennon and Mark Ballas' contributions to the album. They stated that Lennon's "song on the album was smooth, great and classic Lennon Jr." and chose Mark Ballas' track "The Sun Always Shines" as one of the best on the album.

== Track listing ==
All songs by Alan Menken (tracks: 4), Julian Lennon (tracks: 1), Kimberly Forsythe (tracks: 8), Mark Ferris (tracks: 2, 3, 5, 6, 8, 9, 10, 11, 12), Maxi Priest (tracks: 9), Michael Becker (tracks: 7), Nick Souter (tracks: 7), Nick Wood (tracks: 1, 7, 9), and Tim Rice (tracks: 4).

Shine On! Songs
No.	Title	Length
1.	"Children of the World" (performed by Julian Lennon)	4:38
2.	"Bezi" (performed by Tin Cup Gypsy)	3:40
3.	"Grade 3" (performed by Tierney Sutton & Gordon Goodwin's Big Phat Band)	2:51
4.	"Howling At the Moon" (performed by Donna Burke)	3:14
5.	"Summer Is Over" (performed by Tin Cup Gypsy)	3:43
6.	"Tanuki" (performed by Amber Lily)	3:35
7.	"The Sun Always Shines" (performed by Mark Ballas)	4:39
8.	"Another Yesterday" (performed by Wendy Parr)	3:56
9.	"African Sky" (performed by Maxi Priest)	4:28
10.	"Baby Rachel" (performed by Monday Michiru)	5:36
11.	"Play With Me" (performed by Amber Lily & Gordon Goodwin's Big Phat Band)	4:10
12.	"Who I Want To Be" (performed by Rie fu)	5:12
Total length:		48:26
