= Anyone Can Do the Heartbreak =

Single by Anne Murray

from the album Harmony
- B-side: "Without You"
- Released: August 1987
- Genre: Pop
- Length: 4:13
- Label: Capitol 44053
- Songwriter(s): Amanda McBroom, Tom Snow
- Producer(s): Jack White

Anne Murray singles chronology
"Are You Still in Love with Me" (1987)	"Anyone Can Do the Heartbreak" (1987)	"Perfect Strangers" (1988)

"Anyone Can Do the Heartbreak" is a song written by Amanda McBroom and Tom Snow, and performed by Anne Murray. The song reached #4 on the Canadian Adult Contemporary chart and #27 on the U.S. Country chart in 1987. It was released in September 1987 as the second single from her album Harmony. The song was produced by Jack White.

== Charts ==
Chart (1987)	Peak position
Canada Adult Contemporary (RPM)	4
US Hot Country Songs (Billboard)	27

== Cover versions ==
Barry Manilow released a version of the song on his 1989 self-titled album.
