= The Secret Value of Daydreaming =

Studio album by Julian Lennon
- Released: 24 March 1986
- Studios: Compass Point Studios (Nassau, The Bahamas); The Hit Factory (New York City, New York)
- Genre: Pop
- Length: 42:11
- Labels: Charisma (UK); Atlantic (US)
- Producer: Phil Ramone

Julian Lennon chronology
Valotte (1984)	The Secret Value of Daydreaming (1986)	Mr. Jordan (1989)

Singles from The Secret Value of Daydreaming
- 1. "Stick Around" Released: 3 March 1986; 2. "This Is My Day" Released: 12 May 1986; 3. "Want Your Body" Released: 1986

The Secret Value of Daydreaming is the second studio album by English singer-songwriter Julian Lennon, released in 1986.

== Background and recording ==
After going on tour the previous year to promote his previous album, Valotte, Lennon took a break to write material for The Secret Value of Daydreaming. Recording took place in the Bahamas, at Compass Point Studios, with mixing at the Hit Factory in New York City.

== Release ==
Professional ratings
Review scores
Source	Rating
AllMusic	3/5 stars
Chicago Tribune	(Mixed)
Los Angeles Times	(Not favourable)
People	(Positive)
Rolling Stone	(Not favourable)
Robert Christgau	D+

The Secret Value of Daydreaming was released on 24 March 1986 on Charisma in the UK, and a day later on the 25th on Atlantic in the US. The album peaked at number 32 on the Billboard 200 chart upon its release. It was certified gold for sales of over 500,000 copies in the US by the RIAA on 22 May 1986. "Stick Around" reached number 1 on Billboard's Mainstream Rock Tracks chart, and number 32 on the Hot 100 chart.

The album was reissued, along with Mr. Jordan and Help Yourself, on 8 September 2009 by Noble Rot Records.

== Track listing ==
All songs written by Julian Lennon, except where noted.

Side one

1. "Stick Around" – 4:03
2. "You Get What You Want" – 4:04
3. "Let Me Tell You" – 4:16
4. "I've Seen Your Face" – 3:27
5. "Coward Till the End?" – 6:11 (Julian Lennon, Justin Clayton)

Side two

6. "This Is My Day" – 3:51
7. "You Don't Have to Tell Me" – 4:55
8. "Every Day" – 3:51 (Lennon, Clayton, Carlton Morales)
9. "Always Think Twice" – 3:56
10. "Want Your Body" – 3:25

== Music videos ==
- "Stick Around" - features appearances by Jami Gertz, Michael J. Fox, Joe Piscopo and Martin Kove.
- "This Is My Day" - The second single and video to promote the album. The mix of the song is unique to the video, as the version that appears on the album is different. The video mix is available on Lennon's compilation Behind the Music. The single itself failed to chart.
- "Want Your Body" - The final video and single for the album; also failed to chart.

== Personnel ==
Musicians

- Julian Lennon – lead vocals, backing vocals, acoustic piano, keyboards, bass, drum programming
- Chuck Kentis – keyboards
- Billy Joel – acoustic piano (2)
- David Brown – guitars
- Justin Clayton – guitars
- John McCurry – guitars
- Carmine Rojas – bass
- Alan Childs – drums
- Jimmy Bralower – percussion
- Frank Elmo – horns
- Rory Dodd – backing vocals
- Fiona Flanagan – backing vocals
- Peter Hewlett – backing vocals
- Karen Kamon – backing vocals
- Eric Taylor – backing vocals

Production

- Phil Ramone – producer
- Bradshaw Leigh – engineer
- Sean Burrows – associate engineer
- Peter Hefter – associate engineer
- Robert Knox – technical support
- Chris Muth – technical support
- Doug Oberkircher – technical support
- Peter Roder – technical support
- Andy Spray – technical support
- John Ward – technical support
- Barry Diament – CD mastering and remastering at Atlantic Studios (New York, NY)
- Ted Jensen – LP mastering at Sterling Sound (New York, NY)
- Joseph D'Ambrosio – production coordinator
- Timothy White – cover photography
- Bob Defrin – art direction
- Julian Lennon – design concept
- Dean Gordon – management

== Charts ==
=== Weekly charts ===
Chart (1986)	Position
Canadian RPM Albums Chart	22
Swedish Albums Chart	25
UK Albums Chart	93
US Billboard 200	32

=== Year-end charts ===
Chart (1986)	Position
Canadian Albums Chart	77

=== Certifications ===
Region	Certification
United States (RIAA)	Gold
