= Shine On! Kids =

Japanese charitable organization

- Formation: July 2006
- Founders: Kimberly Forsythe and Mark Ferris
- Purpose: Supporting children with cancer in Japan and their families.
- Location: Tokyo, Japan
- Region served: Japan
- Website: sokids.org
- Formerly called: Tyler Foundation

Shine On! Kids, formerly the Tyler Foundation, is a charitable organization located in Tokyo, Japan, which offers psychosocial support to children with cancer in Japan and their families.

== Background ==
Shine On! Kids is incorporated in Japan as a non-profit organization. Founded in 2006 by Mark Ferris, and Kimberly Forsythe, the organization was dedicated in memory of their son, Tyler, who was diagnosed with infant acute lymphoblastic leukemia before he was one month old.

Born in 2003, Tyler died after almost two years of treatment at the National Center for Child Health and Development in Setagaya, Tokyo, in June 2005. The high standard of medical care they experienced contrasted with the lack of psychosocial support offered to families and children with cancer in Japan. Tyler's parents created the Tyler Foundation to help patients and families in Japan going through the challenge of fighting childhood cancer. The organization was renamed Shine On! Kids in 2012.

=== Mission ===
The organization's mission is to improve quality of life during treatment and ensure a smooth and successful transition to normal life after treatment. The foundation's aim is to fundamentally change the way patients’ care is administered throughout Japan in the pediatric oncology wards. They concentrate on patient and parent support such as an on-staff psychologist, support groups and childcare for siblings.

=== Projects ===
In the spring of 2007, the Tyler Foundation launched its counseling and support program, providing a clinical psychologist to the pediatric cancer ward of the National Center for Child Health and Development.

In April 2009, the Tyler Foundation opened its Shine On! House, which provides overnight accommodation for families, childcare for siblings of patients and a place for families to relax. The Tyler Foundation is the sole representative of the US-based Beads of Courage program in Japan. Patients receive a colorful bead corresponding to each aspect of cancer treatment – for example, surgery, radiation, blood tests, etc. The beads serve as symbols of courage to commemorate milestones the children achieved along their individual treatment path. Introduced to Japan by the foundation in 2010, the Beads of Courage Program is said to decrease illness-related distress; increase the use of positive coping strategies; enable children to find meaning in illness, and restore a sense of self in children coping with serious illness.

In addition, the foundation launched its Shine On! Therapy Dog program in 2010, placing Japan's first full-time therapy dog at Shizuoka Children’s Hospital. Bailey, a golden retriever, was trained for two years at Hawaii Canines for Independence in Maui, Hawaii. The dog goes bedside to give children courage and accompanies them during medical procedures. The nurse-handler and therapy dog visit the hospital five days a week, attending pediatric patients’ medical examinations and rehabilitation treatments.

Following the 2011 Tōhoku earthquake and tsunami, the Tyler Foundation decided to offer its expertise to those affected by the earthquake and tsunami. The foundation's Shine On! "Smile Ambassador", Guy Totaro, travels to schools in the affected areas getting the kids to smile as a way of relieving stress.

The foundation also created a musical project called "Shine On! Songs" as a way of raising funds. Students at Sakari Elementary School in Ofunato City participated in the chorus of one of the songs on the CD Who I Want to Be. The song is based on an English version of Miyazawa Kenji's famous poem Ame Ni Mo Makezu. Recording artist Rie fu, who sang the song, visited Sakari Elementary school to share in the happiness of completing the song. A number of artists donated songs to the album including Julian Lennon who donated "Children of the World" to be a track on the album.
