= Are You Still in Love with Me =

Single by Anne Murray

from the album Harmony
- B-side: "Give Me Your Love"
- Released: May 1987
- Genre: Pop
- Length: 4:34
- Label: Capitol 44005
- Songwriters: Jack White, K. C. Porter, Mark Spiro
- Producer: Jack White

Anne Murray singles chronology
"On and On" (1986)	"Are You Still in Love with Me" (1987)	"Anyone Can Do the Heartbreak" (1987)

"Are You Still in Love with Me" is a song written by Jack White, K. C. Porter, and Mark Spiro, and performed by Anne Murray. The song reached #8 on the Canadian Adult Contemporary chart, #10 on the Canadian Country chart, and #20 on the US Country chart in 1987. It was released in May 1987 as the first single from her album Harmony. The song was produced by White.

== Charts ==
Chart (1987)	Peak position
Canada Adult Contemporary (RPM)	8
Canada Country Tracks (RPM)	10
US Adult Contemporary (Billboard)	33
US Hot Country Songs (Billboard)	20
