= John McCurry =

American songwriter (born 1957)

- Also known as: J. Mc Curry; J. McCurry; J.Mc Curry; J.McCurry; John M. McCurry; Jon McCurry; Mc Curry; Mc.Curry; McCurry
- Born: John McCurry; June 24, 1957 (age 69); U.S.
- Origin: New York City, U.S.
- Genres: Rock; pop; classical
- Occupations: Musician; songwriter
- Instruments: Guitar (electric, acoustic, and bass); coral sitar; banjo; accordion
- Years active: 1980–present

John McCurry (born June 24, 1957) is an American musician, songwriter and composer based in New York City. He has worked with many well-known musical artists, including Chicago, Cyndi Lauper, Billy Joel, David Bowie, Alice Cooper, John Waite, Belinda Carlisle, Julian Lennon, Joss Stone, Katy Perry, The Jonas Brothers, and Elliott Yamin.

In 1983, McCurry played lead guitar in the band Cool It Reba. He was lead guitarist in Cyndi Lauper's touring band in the early 1980s. He has also performed in other bands on concert tours, including Anita Baker's Rhythm of Love World Tour in 1994–1995, and John Waite's 1985 American tour. As a performer, all through his younger years, McCurry was visually distinctive because of his naturally bright red hair.

On the website allmusic.com, John McCurry is credited as composer on 119 music albums. His genres are described as pop/rock and classical, and his styles as vocal music and opera. He is credited with guitar on 67 albums, out of which ten specify electric guitar, nine specify acoustic guitar, and four specify bass guitar. He is credited with vocals on seven albums, lyricist on one, arranger on one, producer on one, and text on one. He also has one credit each for coral sitar, banjo and accordion. McCurry is listed as either main personnel, performer, primary artist, or guest artist on 10 albums.

McCurry has also written songs for film and television. He has songwriting credits for soundtrack songs: 11 on film soundtracks, 2 on a TV film soundtrack and one in a television series soundtrack. He has a performer credit for one soundtrack song, and has "music department" credits as vocalist on one film, and for electric guitar on one TV series.

== Songwriter ==
=== Cowritten songs ===
Songs that were co-written by McCurry with other artists appear on the following albums:

- Mr. Jordan, Julian Lennon, five songs co-written with McCurry
- Trash, Alice Cooper, two songs
- Mask of Smiles, John Waite, one song
- Classicks, Alice Cooper, one song
- Help Yourself, Julian Lennon, one song
- BBC Sessions and Other Polished Turds, The Vandals, one song (the Alice Cooper song)
- Stone of Sisyphus, Chicago, Sleeping in the Middle of the Bed

=== With Julian Lennon ===
In an interview on the website "Hey Jules", about Julian Lennon's 1991 album "Help Yourself", Lennon commented about McCurry's musicianship and the songwriting process:

"John McCurry, as usual, did some great stuff with me on this I felt. We didn't actually have that much time together to write this time 'cause he was working on other projects. But we did manage to come up with "Help Yourself."

Lennon also said, about writing the album's title track, "Help Yourself":

"John McCurry and I sat around thinking, 'Well, where are we going to go with this?' and I'd already had part of the music there and then John came in and said, 'Alright, try this' and it was a back and forth thing and we didn't have any lyrics and John again had to, like everybody else I write with, had to disappear back to New York. And I sat around writing and he'd sort of mentioned a couple of ideas and it came together in about two days."

== Guitarist ==
In a review of John Waite's album Rovers Return, about the track "Wild One", Brian McGowan commented that the spirit of the song was "defined in stark relief by John McCurry’s freewheeling, razor sharp axework".

Various others albums that McCurry has played guitar on are:

- Cher (1987 album), Cher
- Heart of Stone, Cher
- Paintings in My Mind, Tommy Page
- The Bridge, Billy Joel
- Hide Your Heart, Bonnie Tyler
- Valotte, Julian Lennon
- The Secret Value of Daydreaming, Julian Lennon
- Mr. Jordan, Julian Lennon
- Help Yourself, Julian Lennon
- Soul Provider, Michael Bolton
- Inside, Matthew Sweet
- No Sound But a Heart, Sheena Easton
- Saints and Sinners, Kane Roberts
- Circle in the Sand, Belinda Carlisle
- Heaven on Earth, Belinda Carlisle
- Some People's Lives, Bette Midler
- Something Real, Phoebe Snow
- Maria Vidal, Maria Vidal
- Rhythm of Love, Anita Baker
- Over My Heart, Laura Branigan
- True Colors, Cyndi Lauper
- A Night to Remember, Cyndi Lauper
- Spoiled Girl, Carly Simon
- Have You Seen Me Lately, Carly Simon
- Discipline, Desmond Child
- Save the Last Dance for Me, Ben E. King
- Satisfied, Taylor Dayne

== Personal life ==
He has a daughter, Riley Pinkerton, who has a fantasy themed doom metal band Castle Rat.
