= The Hunting of the Snark (musical) =

Musical by Mike Batt

The Hunting of the Snark is a musical based on Lewis Carroll's 1876 poem The Hunting of the Snark, written by composer Mike Batt.

== History ==
The musical began life in 1984 as a costumed concert with the London Symphony Orchestra at the Barbican, conducted by Mike Batt and starring Paul Jones as the Baker and Christopher Cazenove as the narrator.

It was created as a concept album in 1986 but withheld from sale after a dispute with the record label CBS (now Sony Music). The recording featured Roger Daltrey, Art Garfunkel, John Gielgud, Stéphane Grappelli, George Harrison, John Hurt, Julian Lennon, Cliff Richard, Captain Sensible, Deniece Williams, and the London Symphony Orchestra. Later that year it was performed as a concert at the Barbican. "Midnight Smoke" was released as a single on 17 November 1986.

A further (costumed) production took place at the Royal Albert Hall on April Fool's Day 1987, with Justin Hayward taking Art Garfunkel's role of the Butcher from the original recording, Billy Connolly replacing Cliff Richard as the Bellman and Midge Ure performing George Harrison's guitar parts. Other performers recreated their roles from the concept recording. This concert was filmed and screened as a television special in some countries.

In October 1990, after Batt had completed the full-length theatrical score and book, it was successfully presented again by Batt and Jackson-Mayo Productions as a dramatised concert in Australia at Sydney's State Theatre and the Hills Centre with the Elizabethan Sinfonietta, with Philip Quast starring as The Bellman, Cameron Daddo as The Butcher, Jackie Love as The Beaver, Doug Parkinson as The Barrister, Daryl Somers as The Billiard Marker, John Waters as Lewis Carroll and David Whitney as The Baker. This production also included additional songs that did not appear on the original 1986 recording.

On 24 October 1991, a £2 million production of the show opened in London at the Prince Edward Theatre, with striking scenery and designs. 12,000 35mm slides were projected from 152 computer-linked projectors arranged around the theatre using a technique developed by Batt over many years, and which had been featured in his Zero Zero TV musical fantasia in 1982. Although reviews praised Batt's visual concepts and Quast as the Bellman, the show closed seven weeks later.

The show was later presented as an amateur production in July 1995 at The Crucible Theatre, Sheffield, with slightly different songs and libretto created by Batt for the occasion. The Sheffield amateur production was produced by Ian Gude for Jolly Good Musical Productions, directed by Steve Morrell, with musical direction by Ian Gude.

== Album and DVD ==
In November 2010, Mike Batt's company Dramatico Entertainment released the original record album from 1986, together with a DVD of the Royal Albert Hall concert from 1987. A sheet music folio of the original album was released to coincide with the 2010 DVD/CD release.

=== Cast ===
- Mike Batt, The Boots/conductor (Album, RAH concert DVD)
- Cliff Richard, The Bellman (album only)
- Philip Quast, The Bellman (West End show)
- Billy Connolly, The Bellman (RAH concert DVD only)
- Roger Daltrey, The Barrister
- Justin Hayward, The Butcher (RAH concert DVD only)
- Art Garfunkel, The Butcher (album)
- John Hurt, Co-Narrator (album)/Narrator (RAH concert)
- John Gielgud, Co-Narrator (album)
- Julian Lennon, The Baker (album and RAH concert DVD)
- Mark McGann The Baker (West End show)
- Captain Sensible, The Billiard Marker (album and RAH concert DVD)
- Kenny Everett The Billiard Marker (West End show)
- Midge Ure, The Banker (Royal Albert Hall concert only)
- Deniece Williams, The Beaver (album and RAH concert)
- David McCallum, Lewis Carroll (West End show)

== Synopsis ==
The Hunting of the Snark tells the tale of several characters who go on a sea journey, searching for a mythical creature called "The Snark", whatever it may be, for the Snark is different things to each of the characters. The Baker's uncle once told him, "If your Snark be a Boojum! ... You will softly and suddenly vanish away, And never be met with again!". Through this journey relationships develop, tensions rise and the Baker's worst nightmare comes true.

Act One

- Prologue
- Opening Titles
- Children Of The Sky
- Hymn To The Snark
- The Storm and Arrival
- Who'll Join Me On This Escapade?
- The Way We Think
- The Departure
- The Bellman's Speech
- Midnight Smoke
- The Trouble With You
- Dancing Towards Disaster

Act Two

- The Banker's Fate
- The Hunting
- Nursery Pictures
- Waiting For A Wave
- The Butchery Waltz
- Snooker Song
- The Pig Must Die
- More Trouble
- The Dismal and Desolate Valley
- A Delicate Combination
- As Long As The Moon Can Shine
- Yet More Trouble
- The Vanishing
- Whatever You Believe

== Creative team ==
- Mike Batt – Writer / Designer / Director
- Jamie Hayes – Co-director
- Andrew Bridge – Lighting
- Jo-Anne Robinson – Choreographer
- Kim Baker – Associate Costume Designer
- Derek Healey – Projection Programming and Development
- John Delnero – Sound Designer
- Chris Slingsby – Audio Visual Supervisor
- Timothy Skelly – Assistant Electrician

== Original London cast ==
- David McCallum, Lewis Carroll
- Kenny Everett, Billiard Marker
- Philip Quast, Bellman
- Mark McGann, Baker
- David Firth, Banker
- Roni Hart, Beaver
- Peter Ledbury, Broker
- Allan Love, Barrister
- Gary Martin, Bishop
- John Partridge, Butcher
- Jae Alexander, Bandmaster / Associate Musical Director
