= Jane Jensen =

Jane Jensen may refer to:

- Jane Jensen (video game designer), American video game designer and author
- Jane Jensen (cricketer), Danish cricketer
- Jane Jensen (musician), American actress, producer and musician
