= Photograph Smile =

Studio album by Julian Lennon
- Released: 18 May 1998
- Recorded: 1996–1998
- Studio: AIR (London, UK); Rockfield (Wales, UK); Windmill Lane (Dublin, Ireland); Forum Studios (Rome, Italy); Studio Mulinetti (Genova, Italy)
- Genre: Baroque pop
- Length: 64:29; 73:10 (bonus tracks)
- Label: Varèse Sarabande (US); Fuel 2000 (US)
- Producer: Julian Lennon; Bob Rose

Julian Lennon chronology
Help Yourself (1991)	Photograph Smile (1998)	Behind the Music – The Julian Lennon Collection (2001)

Singles from Photograph Smile
- 1. "Day After Day" Released: 11 May 1998; 2. "I Don't Wanna Know" Released: 24 August 1998 (UK); 11 May 1999 (US); 3. "Photograph Smile" Released: 1998 (promo only)

Professional ratings
Review scores
Source	Rating
AllMusic	4/5 stars
Entertainment Weekly	A−
Los Angeles Times	3/4 stars
The New York Times	(Positive)
North County Times	A
People	(Positive)
Rolling Stone	3/5 stars
Wall of Sound	65/100

Photograph Smile is the fifth studio album by English singer-songwriter Julian Lennon, released in 1998, after a seven-year hiatus following his previous album, Help Yourself. A promotional sampler was released in 1999 in the US containing the tracks: "I Don't Wanna Know", "Day After Day" and "And She Cries".

The music video of "I Don't Wanna Know" features a parody band of the Beatles called the Butlers. The music video features the Butlers (Ken, a parody of John Lennon; Hector, based on Paul McCartney; Daisy, based on George Harrison; and Bingo, based on Ringo Starr) in a concert with many screaming fans. The concert takes place on a stage similar to the arrow stage from the Beatles' appearance on The Ed Sullivan Show. There is also a box seat with the Queen and Prince, played by Julian Lennon. The first and third segments of the video are filmed in black and white.

== Track listing ==
No.	Title	Writer(s)	Length
1.	"Day After Day"	Julian Lennon, Mark Spiro	4:19
2.	"Cold"	Lennon, Spiro	4:41
3.	"I Should Have Known"	Lennon	4:16
4.	"How Many Times"	Lennon	5:51
5.	"I Don't Wanna Know"	Lennon, Spiro	4:04
6.	"Crucified"	Lennon, Gregory Darling	5:11
7.	"Walls"	Lennon, Darling	4:47
8.	"Believe"	Lennon	4:52
9.	"Good to Be Lonely"	Lennon, Spiro	4:25
10.	"Kiss Beyond the Catcher"	Lennon, Darling	4:00
11.	"And She Cries"	Lennon, Spiro	3:49
12.	"Photograph Smile"	Lennon, Darling	4:35
13.	"Faithful"	Lennon	3:41
14.	"Way to Your Heart"	Lennon, Lisa Dalbello	5:40
Total length:			64:29

Bonus tracks (Japanese edition)
No.	Title	Writer(s)	Length
15.	"Don't Let Me Down"	Lennon, Darling	4:41
16.	"I Need You"	Gerry Beckley	4:00

== Personnel ==
Musicians

- Julian Lennon – lead vocals, backing vocals, keyboards, acoustic guitar, sitar, tambourine, shaker, string arrangements, arrangements
- Bob Rose – keyboards, string arrangements, scoring, conductor
- Gregory Darling – acoustic piano
- Steve Sidelnyk – programming
- Matt Backer – acoustic guitar, electric guitar, electric guitar solo (1)
- Robbie Blunt – acoustic guitar, electric guitar, sitar, electric guitar solo (5)
- Justin Clayton – acoustic guitar, electric guitar, acoustic guitar solo (2), electric guitar solo (5)
- Donal Lunny – bouzouki solo (8)
- Simon Edwards – bass
- Manny Elias – drums
- Paul Clarvis – ethnic percussion, tabla
- The Irish National Symphony Orchestra – strings
- Orchestra Di Santa Cecilia – strings
- Mark Spiro – guest vocals (11)
- Gemma Hayes – guest vocals (13)

Production

- Julian Lennon – producer, mixing, cover design, liner notes
- Bob Rose – producer, engineer, mixing
- Andrew Boland – additional engineer
- Conal Markey – additional engineer
- Bernie Grundman – mastering at Bernie Grundman Mastering (Hollywood, California)
- Marco – technician
- Angelica Letsch – graphic art, layout

== Charts ==
Chart performance for Photograph Smile
Chart (1998)	Position
Australian ARIA Albums Chart	28
Austrian Albums Chart	40
German Media Control Albums Chart	90
Japanese Oricon Albums Chart	70

== Release history ==
Release history and formats for Photograph Smile
Country	Date	Label	Format	Catalog
Japan		Avex Trax	CD	AVCZ-95109 / 4988064951093
United Kingdom	18 May 1998	Music From Another Room, Pinnacle	CD	MFAR44CD
United States	23 February 1999	Fuel 2000	CD	FLD-1028 / 0 30206 10282 6
