= Valotte (song) =

Single by Julian Lennon

from the album Valotte
- B-side: "Well I Don't Know" (US 7"); "Let Me Be" (UK 7"); "Let Me Be", "Bebop " (UK 12")
- Released: October 1984 (US); 3 December 1984 (UK)
- Recorded: February – August 1984
- Genre: Rock
- Length: 4:15
- Label: Atlantic (US); Charisma (UK)
- Songwriters: Julian Lennon, Justin Clayton, Carlton Morales
- Producer: Phil Ramone

Julian Lennon singles chronology
| "Too Late for Goodbyes" (1984) | "Valotte" (1984) | "Say You're Wrong" (1985) |

"Valotte" is a song by British singer Julian Lennon, the title track and second single (first single in the US) from his debut album Valotte. It was a top-ten single in January 1985 on the US Billboard Hot 100 and Canadian pop charts, peaking at No. 9. On the US Adult Contemporary chart, "Valotte" peaked at No. 4. On the Canadian AC chart, it spent two weeks at No. 2.

B-side "Bebop" has been described by Lennon as "almost like a Soul Jackson song".

The music video for the song was directed by Sam Peckinpah, and produced by Martin Lewis.

== Background ==
It was co-written by Lennon, Justin Clayton and Carlton Morales and recorded at Muscle Shoals Sound Studios in Sheffield, Alabama. The first line of the chorus, "Sitting on a pebble by the river playing guitar", was written by Lennon, inspired by the Tennessee River in Muscle Shoals. There are other references to the Tennessee Valley in the lyrics.

== Reception ==
Cash Box said that the song "recalls [John Lennon's] vocal phrasing and melodic arrangement but establishes the young songwriter as an independent and sophisticated artist" and "achieves a quality of Elton John pop."

== Charts ==
| Year-end chart (1985) | Rank |
|---|---|
| US Top Pop Singles (Billboard) | 78 |
