= Gregory Darling =

American singer and composer

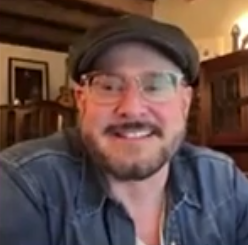
- In a 2025 interview

Background information
- Born: San Diego, U.S.
- Genres: Pop
- Occupations: Singer; songwriter; musician; arranger; producer
- Labels: F.O.D. Records; PolyGram; Maestro Entertainment, Corp

Gregory Darling is an American singer and composer.

== Early life ==
Darling was born in San Diego, California but moved to Los Angeles at the age of 4. By the age of 10, he had passed the audition for the Mitchell Boys Choir (founded by Bob Mitchell) in Hollywood, California where he studied music theory from 1974 to 1981. In 1977, whilst still attending the Mitchell Boys, he performed vocals on composer Ennio Morricone's Exorcist II: The Heretic soundtrack, as well as contributing to the made for TV American movie The Possessed, directed by Jerry Thorpe. In 1981 he performed and appeared in the Universal film All Night Long starring Barbra Streisand and Gene Hackman During this period, Darling also performed in La bohème at the Shrine Auditorium in Los Angeles.

== Musical career ==
In 1985, Darling formed his first band Antix. The band signed to Enigma Records and released the mini-album Get Up, Get Happy. In 1987, Darling met Guns N' Roses, Poison and Mötley Crüe manager Vicky Hamilton who introduced him to producer Bob Rose and American glam metal/glam punk band Faster Pussycat, whom she also managed. Darling subsequently played piano and provided backing vocals for the band's 1987 self-titled debut album. In 1988 Darling recorded demos with his new band, Darling Cruel, and was offered a record contract by George Michael who had recently set up his own Mika Records imprint via Polygram. Soon after this Polygram signed Darling Cruel directly and, later that year, the band recorded their debut album Passion Crimes at Rockfield Studios in Monmouth, Wales. A year later Darling Cruel signed to George Michael's management company, Lippmann/Kahane.

In September 1989, Darling Cruel released their debut album Passion Crimes. The album garnered great reviews and Darling's extraordinary vocal range was officially acknowledged for the first time – "a man with a range and vision that is as unique in approach as W. Axl Rose of Guns n' Roses ..twisting with the confidence of Terence Trent Darby before contortioning into a mutoid David Coverdale." "Everything's Over", the first single lifted from the album, secured active rotation on MTV for six months whilst the album entered the Billboard Top 200 album chart. "Love Child" became the second single to be released from the album.

In 1990 Polygram president Dick Asher resigned whilst Darling Cruel recorded new album Movies For The Mind in New York with producer Tony Visconti. New Polygram president Alain Levy – champion of R 'n' B and rap music – disassociated himself from the new record that was subsequently shelved. In 1991, Darling Cruel toured the US, opening for The Moody Blues before dismembering. Darling remained with Polygram to co-write with Holly Knight. Together they produced "Don't Like The Way You Look At My Love" for Russ Irwin, released on SBK Records. A year later Darling requested to be dropped from the label.

In 1994 Darling jammed live with Prince in Century City – "I was playing a show and this guy comes over to the stage and says 'Is it ok if the Artist Formerly Known As Prince comes up to jam?' Before you know it, the audience parts, and a little man in a golden suit approaches me walks right up on stage, looks directly at me and says 'What key are you in?' I said 'We're in C', and he replied 'Does your bass player know that?!' I'll never forget it! My bass player is shaking, he's terrified. Fortunately, my guitar player recognized this, so he picks up the bass, hands Prince his guitar, and we went off for twenty three minutes on a musical safari, full of chord changes, alternating tempos... an absolutely extraordinary experience" - and a year later he signed a publishing contract with Herman Rarebell's Monaco Records. This led to him co-writing five songs (including the title track) and playing piano) on Julian Lennon's critically acclaimed album Photograph Smile. Between 1998 and 2000 Darling embarked on a world tour with Lennon playing piano and providing backing vocals.

In 2001, Darling worked alongside producer Richard Perry as arranger and musician for his Baby Genius project before continuing his co-writing work with Julian Lennon at the latter's Treehouse Studios. Between 2001 and 2004 he wrote music for DL Music and produced and wrote instrumentals for TV shows American Idol and Behind The Scenes.

In 2005, Darling signed a worldwide publishing and recording deal with Toronto-based FOD Records – set up and run by Dean Manjuris and Bob Rose - and, in 2006, released his debut album Shell. The record was produced by Bob Rose and featured ex Blondie-bassist Nigel Harrison, the Prague Jazz Orchestra, the Czech Symphony (conducted and arranged by Rose) and The London Gospel Choir and New Dream, a duet with Lennon. The album received critical acclaim throughout Europe – the record wasn't released in the US – and Darling found himself opening up for Bryan Adams throughout his 2007 tour of Italy.

In 2010 Darling released his second Bob Rose-produced album, Stew Americano, for FOD Records which received outstanding reviews in the UK, Star magazine acclaiming it "a resolutely and gloriously old-fashioned album that echoes the storytelling stylings of Billy Joel and Elton John", whilst Mark Edwards in the Sunday Times hailed it as "a wonderful album full of classic 1970s-style piano pop that should delight anyone who loves peak-period Elton John, Joe Jackson or even Elvis Costello at his mellowest." The album spawned the singles "Kiss The Pain", "Somebody Kill The DJ", "Hard Way Back" and "Where Were You Last Night".

Darling played piano on Gus Macgregor's debut album Under The Sun, released in 2011. The same year saw him collaborate with electro/acoustic/pop/folk/reggae outfit Caligagan on their album Naked Garden and co-writing three songs – "Hold On", "Don't Wake Me Up" and "Beautiful" – on Julian Lennon's Everything Changes album.

In 2012 Darling released his third solo album Coloured Life on FOD Records, an album that again saw him compared to both Elton John and Billy Joel. He subsequently performed piano on East 17's fifth album Dark Light (2012), then performed co-writing duties, played piano and provided background vocals on Tony Mortimer's debut solo album Songs From The Suitcase, released in 2013. In 2014 he co-wrote the song "I Want Love To Punch Me In The Face" with Blondie's Nigel Harrison and Michael Des Barres for the latter's The Key To The Universe album.

In 2015 Darling provided vocals for Regan's Theme on Ennio Morricone's Oscar-winning score for Quentin Tarantino's The Hateful Eight, whilst also co-writing the song "On The Metro" with Dan Reed for Reed's album Transmission.

In 2016 Darling narrated Cosmos Discovery for NASA and released his first official album in the US entitled Songs From Under The Hat. The album was a compilation of highlights taken from Darling's first three releases Shell, Stew Americano and Colored Life. Darling also co-wrote "When You Shine" and "I'm Alive" with English "People's Tenor" Russell Watson for Watson's album True Stories. Darling subsequently played piano for Watson on his 2017 UK tour.

== Current activity ==
Darling, who is a long-term resident of Europe, has attained Top 40 US Billboard status for his last four single releases. He is working as a producer and writing material for a new album due for release in 2021.
