= Too Late for Goodbyes =

1984 single by Julian Lennon

Single by Julian Lennon

from the album Valotte
- B-side: "Well I Don't Know" (UK 7"); "Let Me Be" (US 7"); "Big Mama", "Well I Don't Know" (UK 12")
- Released: 24 September 1984 (UK); January 1985 (US)
- Recorded: February – August 1984
- Studio: BearTracks Studios (Suffern, New York)
- Genre: New wave
- Length: 3:30
- Label: Charisma (UK); Atlantic (US)
- Songwriter: Julian Lennon
- Producer: Phil Ramone

Julian Lennon singles chronology
"Too Late for Goodbyes" (1984)	"Valotte" (1984)

Music video
- "Too Late for Goodbyes on YouTube

"Too Late for Goodbyes" is the first single (second in the US) from Julian Lennon's debut studio album Valotte (1984). It featured the harmonica of Jean "Toots" Thielemans, and it was a top-10 hit, reaching No. 6 in the UK Singles Chart in November 1984, and No. 5 on the Billboard Hot 100 singles chart in late March 1985. B-side "Big Mama" has been described by Lennon as "semi-hard rock".

Cash Box said that "a galloping reggae backbeat and some exquisite Muscle Shoals guitar work back up Lennon's spare lyric phrasing and lend the song a strong ride."

"Too Late for Goodbyes" peaked at #1 on 16 March 1985 at the US Adult Contemporary chart, spending two weeks at the top of this chart. The music video for the song was directed by Sam Peckinpah, and produced by Martin Lewis. To date, it is the most successful song of Lennon's career.

== Track listing ==
UK 7" single (Charisma JL1)

1. "Too Late for Goodbyes" – 3:30
2. "Well I Don't Know" – 4:35

US 7" single (Atlantic 7-89589)

1. "Too Late for Goodbyes" – 3:30
2. "Let Me Be" – 2:12

UK 12" single (Charisma JL112)

1. "Too Late for Goodbyes" – 3:30
2. "Big Mama" – 3:16
3. "Well I Don't Know" – 4:35

US 12" single (Atlantic 0-86899)

1. "Too Late for Goodbyes (Extended Special Mix)" – 5:55
2. "Too Late for Goodbyes" – 3:30
3. "Let Me Be" – 2:12

== Musicians ==
- Julian Lennon – lead vocals and backing vocals, synthesizers, electronic drums and drum machine
- Barry Beckett – synthesizer
- Justin Clayton – rhythm guitar
- Martin Briley – lead guitar
- Marcus Miller – bass
- Toots Thielemans – harmonica

== Video ==
The video clip was directed by Sam Peckinpah. The choreography and dance were by Moses Pendleton.

== Charts ==
=== Weekly charts ===
Chart (1984–1985)	Peak position
Australia (Kent Music Report)	13
Austria (Ö3 Austria Top 40)	22
Belgium (Ultratop 50 Flanders)	7
Canada Top Singles (RPM)	6
Canada Adult Contemporary (RPM)	1
Ireland (IRMA)	5
Netherlands (Dutch Top 40)	10
Netherlands (Single Top 100)	15
New Zealand (Recorded Music NZ)	24
South Africa (Springbok)	18
Sweden (Sverigetopplistan)	17
Switzerland (Schweizer Hitparade)	30
UK Singles (Official Charts)	6
US Billboard Hot 100	5
US Adult Contemporary (Billboard)	1
US Mainstream Rock (Billboard)	11
US Cash Box Top 100	7
West Germany (GfK)	26

=== Year-end charts ===
Chart (1984)	Rank
UK Singles (Gallup)	77

Chart (1985)	Rank
Canada Top Singles (RPM)	67
US Billboard Hot 100	77
US Cash Box Top 100	70

== Certifications ==
Region	Certification	Certified units/sales
Canada (Music Canada)	Gold	50,000^{^}
^{^} Shipments figures based on certification alone.

== See also ==
- List of Hot Adult Contemporary number ones of 1985
