= Valotte =

Studio album by Julian Lennon
- Released: 15 October 1984
- Recorded: February–August 1984
- Studios: Muscle Shoals Sound Studio (Alabama) BearTracks Studios (Suffern, New York) A & R Recording Studios, Clinton Recording Studios and The Hit Factory (New York City)
- Genres: Rock; pop
- Length: 38:17
- Labels: Charisma (UK); Atlantic (US)
- Producer: Phil Ramone

Julian Lennon chronology
Valotte (1984)	The Secret Value of Daydreaming (1986)

Singles from Valotte
- 1. "Too Late for Goodbyes" Released: 24 September 1984; 2. "Valotte" Released: October 1984; 3. "Say You're Wrong" Released: 18 February 1985; 4. "Jesse" Released: July 1985

Valotte is the debut studio album by singer-songwriter Julian Lennon. The album was produced by Phil Ramone and recorded at several studios from February to August 1984. It was released in October 1984 on Charisma and Atlantic. The album was first certified gold in the United States, in the new year, then shortly afterwards being certified platinum. From the album, four singles were released, each with a music video, charting at various positions on the singles charts in both the United Kingdom and US. "Too Late for Goodbyes", the second US single, and "Valotte", the first US single, were both US Billboard Top 10 hits, the former reaching No. 5 and the latter reaching No. 9. The album peaked at No. 17 in the US and No. 20 in the UK. Lennon toured the US, Australia, and Japan in March–June 1985.

== Background ==
Julian Lennon sent the Charisma Records label head, Tony Stratton Smith, a demo tape in September 1983. After listening to the tape and being impressed with Lennon's songwriting skills, Smith signed Lennon to the label in the United Kingdom, while Lennon was signed to Atlantic Records in the United States after its label head, Ahmet Ertegun, was also impressed with Lennon's songwriting. A month later, Lennon, with his friends Justin Clayton and Carlton Morales, started a three-month stay at a French château, Manoir de Valotte, in Saint-Benin-d'Azy, France, writing and demoing songs for what would appear on Valotte. In an interview with Rock Bill magazine, Lennon said that he "had a lot of the material" before embarking to the château. About the songs, Lennon said that half the songs on the album had "already [been] written on the piano" in short pieces, about "a year or two before". In an interview for No 1 magazine, Lennon said the pieces were not originally "for an album", and that some of the music was "written several years ago, some [...] new". The lyrics were added only a few years prior to recording the songs for the album.

== Recording and content ==
The album was produced by Phil Ramone in January 1984. Lennon had asked about his availability after he heard Ramone's work on Billy Joel's The Nylon Curtain album. Ramone agreed upon hearing Lennon's previous recordings. The album was recorded February–August 1984 at: Muscle Shoals Sound Studio in Sheffield, Alabama; Bear Tracks Recording Studio, Suffern, New York; A & R Recording Studios; Clinton Recording Studios; and The Hit Factory, the latter three located in New York City. The album was mixed by Bradshaw Leigh at The Hit Factory. Lennon's father, John Lennon, had recorded at The Hit Factory four years before, on the album Double Fantasy, shortly before his death. Ramone had asked Lennon if he felt "the ghosts?"; he responded "They feel good for me. The vibes feel good and I want to be here!"

Lennon said that his father's album, Imagine, had influenced Valotte's writing, but he was not "trying to carry on tradition, except maybe in the simplicity of Dad's writing". The title track is named after Manoir de Valotte, Lennon said it was a "kind of dream house [...] so that's what started off the whole song". "Space" originally started out as a music piece on bass guitar, Lennon said that his girlfriend helped: "My girlfriend came up [...] she said, 'Oh well, that sounds like either underneath icebergs [...] or space, like drifting in space' [...] [I] worked overnight and just came up with that." Lennon's reply to his girlfriend was: "well I'll forget the icebergs and give space a go!" "Well I Don't Know" was written about his father: "It's about looking for signs of the afterlife from Dad".

Shortly after the cover photo was taken, Lennon fell out with his then girlfriend and "Too Late for Goodbyes" was written, halfway through the recording of the album. "Lonely", which dates from 1982, is about when Lennon moved to London, without having any of his friends or family nearby. "Jesse", was offered to Lennon by China Burton, as Burton thought it would fit Lennon's voice. Overall, Lennon commented that "all of the songs [...] are from experience or feelings or relationships" in "real life situations" with "a feeling of neither knowing which way to turn nor what to do next".

== Release and aftermath ==
"Too Late for Goodbyes" (Note: In the UK, "Too Late for Goodbyes" was backed with "Well I Don't Know" as the 7" B-side, and "Big Mama" and "Well I Don't Know" as the 12" B-sides. 7": UK Charisma JL1; 12": UK Charisma JL112) was released as the first UK single, a month before Valotte came out, on 24 September 1984 in the UK, peaking at No. 6 on the UK Singles Chart, and in Australia at No. 13. It was also released as a picture disc in the UK. (Note: UK Charisma JLY1) The album was first issued on 15 October 1984 on Charisma in the UK, (Note: LP: UK Charisma JLLP 1; CD: UK Charisma JLCD1) and four days later on the 19th on Atlantic in the U.S. (Note: LP: US Atlantic 7 80184-1; CD: US Atlantic 7 80184-2) The album peaked at No. 17 in the U.S. on the Billboard 200 chart, and at No. 20 in the UK. The album's title track, "Valotte", was released as the album's first single in the U.S., (Note: In the US, "Valotte" was backed with "Well I Don't Know" as the 7" B-side. US Atlantic 7-89609) in October 1984, reaching No. 2 on the Billboard Mainstream Rock Tracks chart, No. 4 on the Billboard Adult Contemporary chart, and No. 9 on the Billboard Hot 100 chart. Upon the album's release, Paul McCartney sent Lennon a telegram, with the message: "Good luck, old fruit". McCartney thought the album was "great!", also saying that he found it "very surprising". "Valotte" was also the album's second UK single, (Note: In the UK, "Valotte" was backed with "Let Me Be" as the 7" B-side, and "Let Me Be" and "Bebop" as the 12" B-sides. 7": UK Charisma JL2; 12": UK Charisma JL212) released in December 1984, peaking at No. 55 in the UK Singles Chart, and No. 75 in Australia. It was also released as a shaped picture disc in the UK. (Note: UK Charisma JLS2)

Music videos were produced for the singles "Valotte" and "Too Late for Goodbyes", directed by Sam Peckinpah, and produced by Martin Lewis. Two versions of a music video for "Say You're Wrong" were directed by Tim Pope. A concert video recording is used as a music video for "Jesse", which aired exclusively on MTV. Lennon said in an interview with Music Express, that the album was his "way of getting a foot in the door" with the songs "in entirely different styles". In the U.S., "Too Late for Goodbyes" was released in January 1985, (Note: In the US, "Too Late for Goodbyes" was backed with "Let Me Be" as the 7" B-side. US Atlantic 7-89589) peaking at number 1 on the Adult Contemporary chart, No. 5 on the Hot 100 chart, and No. 11 on the Mainstream Rock Tracks chart. A remixed version of the track did chart on Billboard Dance Music/Club Play Singles and their Hot Dance Music/Maxi-Singles Sales charts at Nos. 14 and 49, respectively. "Say You're Wrong" was released as the last UK single on 18 February 1985, (Note: In the UK, "Say You're Wrong" was backed with "Bebop" as the 7" B-side, and "Bebop" and "Too Late for Goodbyes (Long Version)" as the 12" B-sides. 7": UK Charisma JL3; 12": UK Charisma JL312) and the third U.S. single in April 1985. (Note: In the US, "Say You're Wrong" was backed with "Big Mama" as the 7" B-side. US Atlantic 7-89567) The song peaked at No. 75 on the UK Singles Chart, No. 3 on the Mainstream Rock Tracks chart, No. 6 on the Adult Contemporary chart and No. 21 on the Hot 100 chart in the U.S., and No. 31 on the Australian singles chart. "Jesse" was released as the album's final single in the U.S. in July 1985, (Note: In the US, "Jesse" was backed with "Bebop" as the 7" B-side. US Atlantic 7-89529) peaked at No. 54 on the Hot 100 chart.

On 9 January 1985, the album was certified Gold by the Recording Industry Association of America (RIAA). It was certified Platinum on 13 March by the RIAA, having shipped one million copies in the US. Also receiving a nomination for Best New Artist at the 28th Grammy Awards. By February 1985, Valotte had reached 1.5 million worldwide sales. Originally saying that he would not be touring until he had a second album out, Lennon relented and between March and June 1985, he staged his first tour, starting off in the U.S., visiting Australia and finishing off in Japan. The tour setlist consisted of songs from Valotte, two rock 'n' roll songs ("Stand by Me" and "Slippin' and Slidin'"), the Beatles' "Day Tripper", (Note: Lennon chose to perform "Day Tripper" due to the song's opening lyrics: "Got a good reason for taking the easy way out".) and the B-side, "Big Mama". The music video for "Valotte" was nominated for MTV's "Best Video by a New Artist" award in July 1985. On 13 September 1985, "Too Late for Goodbyes" was nominated for MTV's "Best New Artist" award, but lost to 'Til Tuesday's "Voices Carry". Just over a month later, on 23 October 1985, Lennon's mother, Cynthia Lennon accepted the "ASCAP Award for Publishing", on her son's behalf. A video featuring footage from Lennon's tour, titled Stand by Me: A Portrait of Julian Lennon, was released on MCA Home Video on 28 November 1985. Ramone and the album's engineer, Bradshaw Leigh, both worked with Lennon on his next album, The Secret Value of Daydreaming (1986).

== Critical reception ==
In a contemporary review for Saturday Review magazine, music critic John Swenson gave Valotte two out of five stars and critiqued that Lennon's voice lacks the "tortured cynicism and urgency that characterised his father's and, consequently, Valotte sounds like languid outtakes from Imagine." In a three-star review, Davitt Sigerson of Rolling Stone said that it is both "exciting and irritating". He found the album's similarities to John Lennon's later work strange, observing "a middle-aged sensibility, reinforced by Phil Ramone's elegant but often stodgy production, applied to unashamedly youthful themes." Robert Christgau, writing for The Village Voice, gave Valotte a "C" and panned it as "bland professional pop of little distinction and less necessity—tuneful at times, tastefully produced of course, and with no discernible reason for being". Christgau found Lennon's vocal resemblance to his father "eerie" and viewed him as "more Frank Sinatra Jr. than (even) Hank Williams Jr."

In a retrospective review, Allmusic editor Stephen Thomas Erlewine gave Valotte three-and-a-half out of five stars and wrote that it is "by any measure the debut of a gifted pop melodicist." He viewed that on the album's highlights, Lennon exhibited a strong sense for "Beatlesque pop songwriting, drawing equally from [John] Lennon and [Paul] McCartney", and at his worst, he drew too often on contemporary conventions such as synthesisers. Paul Evans, writing in The Rolling Stone Album Guide (2004), gave the album two out of five stars and remarked that Lennon "settles for clean but modest stuff—high-end MOR", while finding all of his albums "pervaded with a sort of listlessness, a free-floating pathos".

Cash Box said that the third single "Say You're Wrong" "has a light salsa feel with a bouncy hook" and has a "less ponderous mood" than the first two singles from the album, "Valotte" and "Too Late for Goodbyes," with its festive horn backup and strict percussion."

Cash Box said of the fourth single "Jesse" that it's "a bit more toned down than previous Lennon hits, but with its dynamic performances and involving melody and lyrics." Billboard described "Jesse" as a "cautionary tale framed in Latin/r&b rhythms."

== Track listing ==
All songs written by Julian Lennon, except where noted.

Side one

1. "Valotte" (Julian Lennon, Justin Clayton, Carlton Morales) – 4:15
2. "O.K. for You" (Lennon, Clayton, Morales, Carmelo Luggeri) – 3:38
3. "On the Phone" – 4:42
4. "Space" – 4:22
5. "Well I Don't Know" – 4:35

Side two

6. "Too Late for Goodbyes" – 3:30
7. "Lonely" – 3:50
8. "Say You're Wrong" – 3:25
9. "Jesse" (China Burton) – 3:48
10. "Let Me Be" – 2:12

== Personnel ==
Personnel adapted from inner sleeve.

=== Musicians ===
- Julian Lennon – lead vocals, backing vocals, keyboards, bass guitar, Simmons drums
- Barry Beckett, David LeBolt, Peter Wood – keyboards
- Justin Clayton, Carlton Morales – guitars
- Martin Briley – guitar (6)
- Dennis Herring – guitar (9)
- David Hood, Marcus Miller, Carmine Rojas – bass guitar
- Roger Hawkins – drums
- Steve Holley – drums, percussion
- Ralph MacDonald – percussion
- Toots Thielemans – harmonica (6)
- Michael Brecker – saxophones, sax solo (7)
- Ronnie Cuber – saxophones
- Lawrence Feldman – saxophones
- George Young – saxophones
- Jon Faddis – trumpet
- Joe Shepley – trumpet
- Rory Dodd – backing vocals
- Eric Troyer – backing vocals

=== Production ===
- Barry Beckett and the Muscle Shoals Rhythm Section – arrangements
- David Matthews – horn arrangements
- Phil Ramone – producer
- Pete Greene – engineer
- Bradshaw Leigh – engineer, mixing
- Mike Alliare – assistant engineer
- Michael Barry – assistant engineer
- Bobby Cohen – assistant engineer
- Lee Daley – assistant engineer
- John Davenport – assistant engineer
- Scott James – assistant engineer
- Peter Millus – assistant engineer
- John Penzotti – assistant engineer
- Michael Somers-Abbott – assistant engineer
- Bill Straus – assistant engineer
- Ted Jensen – mastering at Sterling Sound (New York City, New York)
- Joseph D'Ambrosio – production coordinator
- Bob Defrin – sleeve design
- Julian Lennon – sleeve design
- David Michael Kennedy – cover photography
- Dean Gordon – photography

== Charts ==
=== Weekly charts ===
Chart (1984–1985)	Position
Australia Albums (Kent Music Report)	8
Canada Top Albums/CDs (RPM)	12
German Albums (Offizielle Top 100)	60
Japanese Albums Chart	41
Swedish Albums (Sverigetopplistan)	15
New Zealand Albums (RMNZ)	15
UK Albums (Official Charts)	20
US Billboard 200	17

=== Year-end charts ===
Chart (1984)	Position
Canadian Albums Chart	76
Chart (1985)	Position
Australian Albums Chart	63
Canadian Albums Chart	34
US Billboard 200	30

== Certifications ==
Certifications for Valotte
Region	Certification	Certified units/sales
United Kingdom (BPI)	Silver	60,000^{^}
United States (RIAA)	Platinum	1,000,000^{^}
^{^} Shipments figures based on certification alone.
