= Julian Lennon =

English musician, photographer, and philanthropist (born 1963)

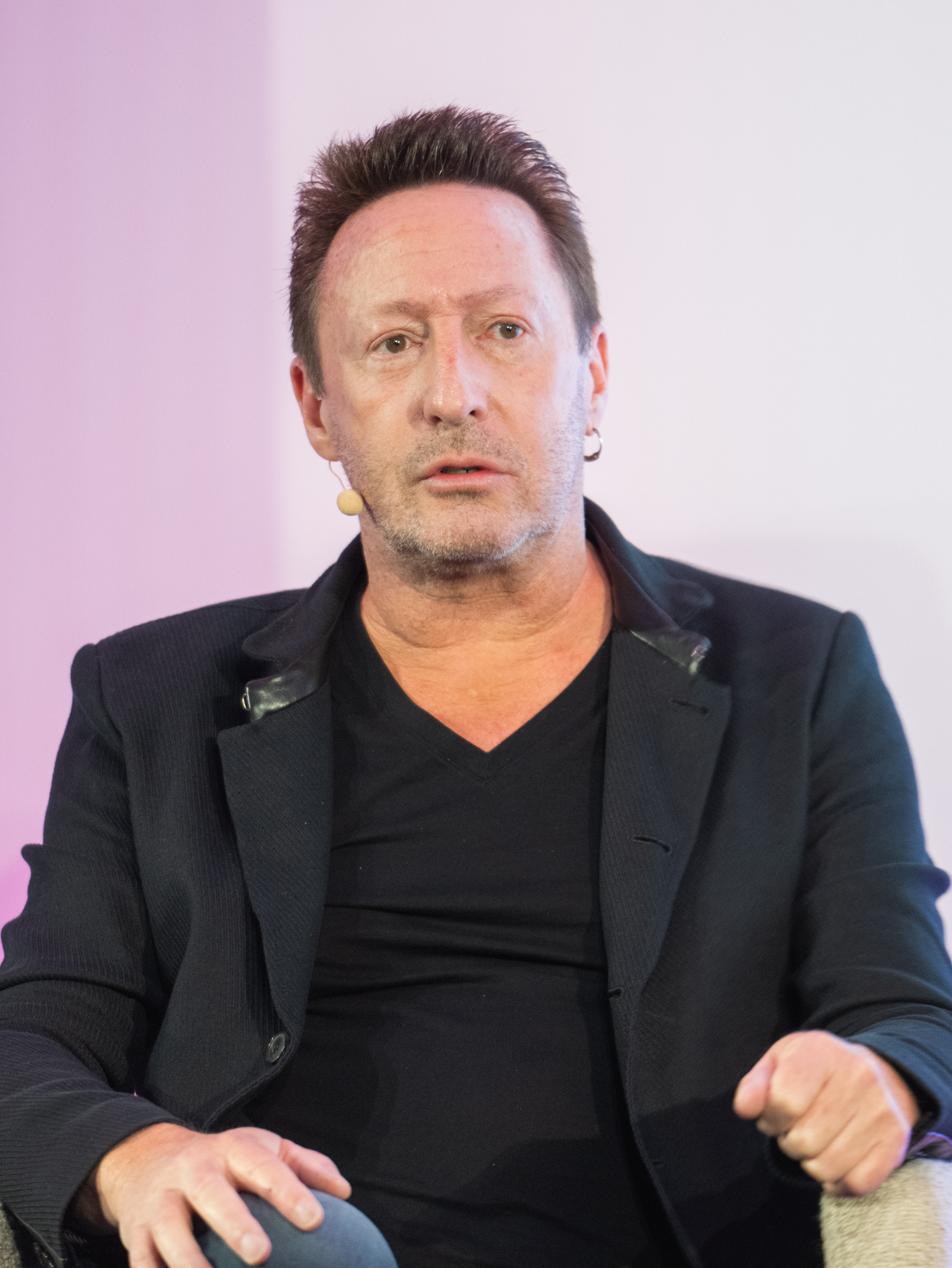
- Lennon at SXSW London in 2025
- Born: John Charles Julian Lennon; 8 April 1963 (age 63); Liverpool, England
- Other names: Jules; Jude
- Occupations: Musician; photographer
- Years active: 1984–present
- Parents: John Lennon; Cynthia Lennon
- Relatives: Sean Lennon (half-brother); Julia Lennon (grandmother); Alfred Lennon (grandfather); Mimi Smith (great-aunt)
- Musical career
- Genres: Rock; pop
- Instruments: Vocals; guitar; keyboards; drums
- Labels: Atlantic; Music from Another Room; Charisma; Virgin; BMG
- Website: julianlennon.com

Julian Charles John Lennon (born John Charles Julian Lennon; 8 April 1963) is an English musician, photographer, author, and philanthropist. He is the son of Beatles member John Lennon and his first wife Cynthia; Julian is named after his paternal grandmother Julia. Julian inspired three Beatles songs: "Lucy in the Sky with Diamonds" (1967), "Hey Jude" (1968), and "Good Night" (1968).

Lennon started a music career in 1984 with the album Valotte, most notable for "Too Late for Goodbyes" and the title track, and has since released six more albums. He has held exhibitions of his fine-art photography and has written several children's books. In 2006, Lennon produced the environmental documentary film Whaledreamers, which won eight international awards. In 2007, he founded The White Feather Foundation (TWFF), whose stated mission goal is to address "environmental and humanitarian issues".

In 2020, Lennon was executive producer of the Netflix documentary Kiss the Ground about regenerative agriculture and the follow-up film Common Ground. In 2022, Lennon was executive producer of the documentary film Women of the White Buffalo, which chronicles the lives of women living on the Lakota Pine Ridge Indian Reservation.

== Early life ==
Julian Lennon was born John Charles Julian Lennon on 8 April 1963 at Sefton General Hospital in Liverpool, to John Lennon and Cynthia Powell. He was named after his paternal grandmother, Julia Lennon, who died five years before his birth. The Beatles' manager, Brian Epstein, was his godfather. Lennon was educated firstly at Kingsmead School, Hoylake, during 1974–1975; then, when his mother remarried, he moved to Wales and attended Ruthin School, a boarding private school in the town of Ruthin, Denbighshire, in North Wales.

Lennon inspired one of his father's most famous songs, "Lucy in the Sky with Diamonds", whose lyrics describe a picture the boy had painted, a watercolour of his friend, Lucy O'Donnell, from nursery school, surrounded by stars. Another composition of his father inspired by him was the lullaby "Good Night", the closing song of The Beatles (also known as The White Album). In 1967, at the age of four, he attended the set of the Beatles' film Magical Mystery Tour.

When Julian was five years old, in 1968, his parents divorced, following his father's affair with Japanese multimedia artist Yoko Ono. John Lennon married Ono on 20 March 1969. Julian would later have a younger half-brother, Sean Lennon.

Paul McCartney wrote "Hey Jude" to console him over the divorce; originally called "Hey Jules", McCartney changed the name because he thought that "Jude" was an easier name to sing. After his parents' divorce, Julian had almost no contact with his father until the early 1970s when, at the request of his father's then-girlfriend, May Pang (Yoko Ono and Lennon had temporarily separated), he began to visit his father regularly. John Lennon bought Julian a Gibson Les Paul guitar and a drum machine for Christmas 1973 and encouraged his interest in music by showing him some chords.

== Career ==
=== Music career ===
Aside from the Beatles, Lennon was influenced by David Bowie, Keith Jarrett, Steely Dan, and AC/DC.

Lennon made his musical debut at age 11 on his father's album Walls and Bridges playing drums on "Ya-Ya", later saying, "Dad, had I known you were going to put it on the album, I would've played much better!" In the sleeve notes in the album the song is credited to Julian Lennon "starring on drums" with "dad on piano".

Lennon enjoyed immediate success with his debut album, Valotte, released in 1984. Produced by Phil Ramone, it spawned two top 10 hits, (the title track and "Too Late for Goodbyes") and earned Lennon a nomination for the Grammy Award for Best New Artist in 1986. Music videos for the two hits were made by film director Sam Peckinpah and producer Martin Lewis. After the album's release, Paul McCartney sent Lennon a telegram wishing him good luck.

Lennon's second album, 1986's The Secret Value of Daydreaming, was panned by critics but reached number 32 on the Billboard 200 chart and produced the single "Stick Around", which was Lennon's first number-one single on the US Album Rock Tracks chart. He recorded the song "Because", previously recorded by the Dave Clark Five, in the UK for Clark's 1986 musical Time.

On 1 April 1987, Julian Lennon appeared as the Baker in Mike Batt's musical The Hunting of the Snark (based on Lewis Carroll's poem). The all-star lineup included Roger Daltrey, Justin Hayward and Billy Connolly, with John Hurt as the narrator. The performance, a musical benefit at London's Royal Albert Hall in aid of people who are deaf, was attended by the Duchess of York. In October the same year he performed with Chuck Berry. Although Lennon never achieved the same level of success in the US as he had enjoyed with Valotte, his 1989 single "Now You're in Heaven" peaked at number five in Australia and gave him his second number one hit on the Album Rock Tracks chart in the US.

In 1991, George Harrison sent some ideas for Lennon's album Help Yourself, although he did not play or receive any credits. The single "Saltwater" reached number six in the UK and topped the Australian singles charts for four weeks. During this time, Lennon contributed a cover of the Rolling Stones' "Ruby Tuesday" to the soundtrack of the television series The Wonder Years.

Lennon left the music business for several years in the 1990s to focus on philanthropy after his encounter with elders from the Mirning people of Australia. After he began his performing career, there was occasionally unfounded media speculation that Lennon would undertake performances with McCartney, Harrison and Ringo Starr. In the Beatles Anthology series in 1995, the three surviving Beatles confirmed there was never an idea of having Julian sit in for his father as part of a Beatles reunion, with McCartney saying, "Why would we want to subject him to all of this?"

In May 1998, Lennon released the album Photograph Smile on his own record label. Music critic Stephen Thomas Erlewine praised the album as "well-crafted and melodic", and concluded by saying that it was "the kind of music that would receive greater praise if it weren't made by the son of a Beatle". In 2002, he recorded a version of "When I'm Sixty-Four", from the Beatles' Sgt. Pepper's Lonely Hearts Club Band album, for an Allstate Insurance commercial.

In 2006, he ventured into Internet businesses, including MyStore.com with Todd Meagher and Bebo founder Michael Birch. In 2009, Lennon created a new partnership with Meagher and Birch called theRevolution, LLC. Through this company, Lennon released a tribute song and EP, "Lucy", honouring the memory of Lucy Vodden (née O'Donnell), the little girl who inspired the song "Lucy in the Sky with Diamonds", with 50 per cent of the proceeds going to fund Lupus research.

In October 2011, Lennon released the album Everything Changes. In 2012 he worked with music film director Dick Carruthers on the feature-length video documentary Through the Picture Window, which followed Lennon's journey in the making of Everything Changes and includes interviews with Steven Tyler, Bono, Gregory Darling, Mark Spiro and Paul Buchanan from The Blue Nile. Through the Picture Window was also released as an app in all formats with bespoke videos for all 14 tracks from the album.

On September 9, 2022, Lennon's album Jude was released on BMG. It included the singles "Freedom" and "Every Little Moment". Goldmine wrote about the release, "With his new album, the first in 11 years, Julian advances his body of work that has always simultaneously explored personal and global themes, but for the first time in his life, he's embracing his inner status as someone's son...[an] introspective masterwork from a diversely talented artist." The title is a reference to the Beatles song "Hey Jude", which Paul McCartney wrote in 1968 to give Julian Lennon hope for the future. Lennon said about his album title, "Calling it Jude was very coming of age for me in that regard because it was very much facing up to who I am...The content came from over three decades of songwriting. The themes and issues mostly being the same, generally about the wars within and the wars without."

On 23 August 2024, Lennon released a new version of "I Should Have Known", which was remixed by Spike Stent. Lennon shared, "[the song] was always a favourite of mine,” says Lennon. “I loved the way the new album ['Jude'] sounded in particular. (...) I thought maybe Mark 'Spike' Stent will remix this for me and give it a new life. I want it to breathe life into the world again."

=== Film ===
Lennon's first tour as a solo musician, in early 1985, was documented as part of the film Stand by Me: A Portrait of Julian Lennon – a film profile started by Sam Peckinpah, but completed by Martin Lewis after Peckinpah's death. Lennon has appeared in several other films including The Rolling Stones Rock and Roll Circus (released 1996, originally filmed in 1968), Cannes Man (1996), Imagine: John Lennon (1988), Chuck Berry: Hail! Hail! Rock 'n' Roll (1987) and a cameo in Leaving Las Vegas (1995) as a bartender. Julian provided the voice for the title role in the animated film David Copperfield (1993). He was also the voice of the main character Toby the Teapot in the animated special The Real Story of I'm a Little Teapot (1990).

Lennon is also the producer of the documentary, Whaledreamers, about an Indigenous Australian tribe and the peoples' special connection with whales. It also touches on many environmental issues. This film received several awards and was shown at the 2007 Cannes Film Festival.

In 2018, Lennon was an executive producer of Women of the White Buffalo, a documentary film released in 2022 that focused on several Lakota women from Pine Ridge Indian Reservation in South Dakota, and their work to preserve their way of life in the face of colonialism.

In 2020, Lennon was an executive producer of Kiss the Ground, an award-winning documentary film about regenerative agriculture, narrated by Woody Harrelson.

=== Photography ===
Lennon shared with artist Amadour the impetus behind his photography, "I traveled internationally from about 11 when I went to see Dad [John Lennon] in America... I just realized that everything in life, as we know, only happens once in a split second, and that’s it. A cloud may look stagnant as it’s drifting by, but it’s constantly changing, constantly moving." After photographing his half-brother Sean's music tour in 2007, Lennon took up a serious interest in photography. On 17 September 2010, Lennon opened an exhibition of 35 photographs called "Timeless: The Photography of Julian Lennon" with help from long-time friend and fellow photographer Timothy White. Originally scheduled to run from 17 September to 10 October, the Morrison Hotel Gallery extended it a week to end 17 October. The photographs include shots of his brother Sean and U2 frontman Bono. Lennon's "Alone" collection was featured at the Art Basel Miami Beach from 6–9 December 2012, to raise money for The White Feather Foundation.

Lennon's "Horizon" series was featured at the Emmanuel Fremin Gallery, NYC, 12 March 2015, to 2 May 2015. Lennon's "Cycle" exhibit was featured at the Leica Gallery in Los Angeles, in the fall of 2016.In 2021, Lennon became the first fine-arts photographer featured at the new gallery in Aston Martin Residences Miami. In 2023, Lennon showed a series of photographs in an exhibition titled ATMOSPHERIA at William Turner Gallery in Santa Monica, California.

=== Books ===
Shortly after the death of his father, Lennon began collecting Beatles memorabilia. In 2010, he published a book describing his collection, entitled: Beatles Memorabilia: The Julian Lennon Collection. In 2017, Lennon began a New York Times bestselling trilogy, Touch the Earth, Heal the Earth and Love the Earth, which he completed in 2019. On 9 November 2021, Lennon published a graphic novel for middle-grade children, The Morning Tribe, with co-author Bart Davis.

== Philanthropy ==
A conversation Lennon once had with his father went as follows: "Dad once said to me that should he pass away, if there was some way of letting me know he was going to be OK – that we were all going to be OK – the message would come to me in the form of a white feather. ... the white feather has always represented peace to me". Then Julian, while on a tour in Australia, received a white feather from two Indigenous elders of the Mirning tribe in Adelaide, Australia, asking for him to help give them a voice. In response, he produced the documentary Whaledreamers about their tribe, and in 2007 he founded The White Feather Foundation (TWFF), whose mission "embraces environmental and humanitarian issues and in conjunction with partners from around the world helps to raise funds for the betterment of all life, and to honor those who have truly made a difference."

TWFF partners with philanthropists and charities around the world to raise funds for various humanitarian projects in four major areas of giving: clean water, the preservation of Indigenous cultures, the environment and education and health. In 2008, the Prince of Monaco Albert II presented TWFF with the Better World Environmental Award.

In 1998, Lennon donated $100,000 at the Channel 7 telethon in Perth to raise funds for research into children's illnesses.

In 2015, after the Nepal earthquake, TWFF contributed $106,347.52 to the Music for Relief's Nepal aid fund to support the victims of the earthquake.

Lennon visited Kenya, Ethiopia and Colombia in 2014 to witness the education and environmental initiatives by TWFF. After his mother's death the following year, Lennon announced that he would be naming TWFF's scholarship program after her: "The Cynthia Lennon Scholarship for Girls". Since then, the Foundation has awarded over 50 scholarships to girls across Africa, the U.K and the U.S.

In 2019, Lennon contributed his voice and music to the soundtrack of narrative feature film One Little Finger, which has the initiative to spread awareness about 'ability in disability'. It shows how important and powerful music is to support societal and cognitive development of people with disabilities.

In September 2020, Lennon was honoured with the CC Forum Philanthropy Award in Monaco. That same month, he was named a UNESCO Center for Peace 2020 Cross-Cultural and Peace Crafter Award Laureate.

In 2022, Lennon recorded his version of his father's 1971 song "Imagine" with all proceeds going to support Ukraine.

== Personal life ==
Lennon has no children, revealing in 2011 that his difficult relationship with his father had discouraged him from doing so.

In 2020, he legally changed his name from John Charles Julian Lennon to Julian Charles John Lennon to reflect the name by which he has always been known.

=== Relationship with his father ===
Following his father's murder on 8 December 1980, Julian Lennon voiced anger and resentment toward him, saying, "I've never really wanted to know the truth about how Dad was with me. There was some very negative stuff talked about me [...] like when he said I'd come out of a whiskey bottle on a Saturday night. Stuff like that. You think, where's the love in that? Paul and I used to hang about quite a bit [...] more than Dad and I did. We had a great friendship going and there seems to be far more pictures of me and Paul playing together at that age than there are pictures of me and my dad."

Lennon chafed at hearing his father's 'peace and love' stance perpetually celebrated. He told The Daily Telegraph, "I have to say that, from my point of view, I felt he was a hypocrite. Dad could talk about peace and love out loud to the world but he could never show it to the people who supposedly meant the most to him: his wife and son. How can you talk about peace and love and have a family in bits and pieces—no communication, adultery, divorce? You can't do it, not if you're being true and honest with yourself." Julian added, "Mum was more about love than Dad. He sang about it, he spoke about, but he never really gave it, at least not to me as his son. The darker side definitely comes from Dad. Whenever I get too aggressive, which comes from Dad's side, I try to calm myself down, be more positive."

Recalling his renewed contact with his father in the mid-1970s, Lennon said in 2009, "Dad and I got on a great deal better then. We had a lot of fun, laughed a lot and had a great time in general when he was with May Pang. My memories of that time with Dad and May are very clear—they were the happiest time I can remember with him."

Lennon's father excluded him from his will but created a trust of £100,000 to be shared between Julian and his half-brother, Sean. Julian sued his father's estate and in 1996 reached a settlement agreement, authorised by Lennon's widow, Yoko Ono, reportedly worth £20 million.

In an interview with CBS News in 2009, Lennon stated, "I realised if I continued to feel that anger and bitterness towards my dad, I would have a constant cloud hanging over my head my whole life. After recording the song 'Lucy,' almost by nature, it felt right to fulfill the circle, forgive Dad, put the pain, anger and bitterness in the past, and focus and appreciate the good things. Writing is therapy for me and, for the first time in my life, I'm actually feeling it and believing it. It also has allowed me to actually embrace Dad and the Beatles."

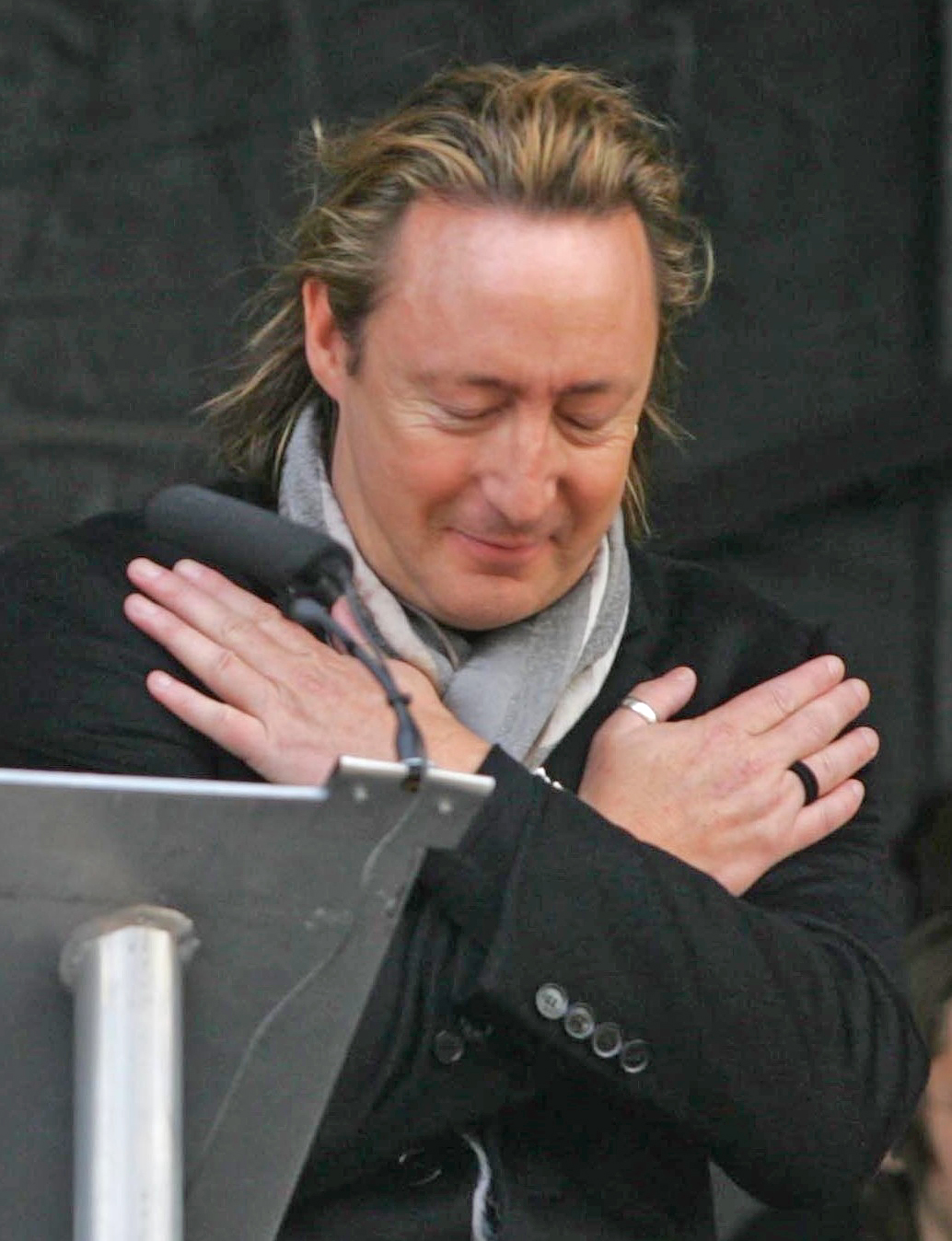
Lennon on 9 October 2010

In commemoration of John Lennon's 70th birthday and as a statement for peace, Lennon and his mother, Cynthia, unveiled the John Lennon Peace Monument in his home town of Liverpool, on 9 October 2010.

=== Other relationships ===
Lennon has been quoted as having a reasonably "cordial" relationship with Ono, following the financial settlement against his late father's estate. He remains close to her son, Sean, his half-brother. Julian saw Sean perform live for the first time in Paris on 12 November 2006 at La Boule Noire, and he and Sean spent time together on Sean's tour in 2007.

Lennon remains friends with his father's former bandmate Paul McCartney, though they experienced a brief public falling out in 2011 when Lennon was not invited to McCartney's wedding to Nancy Shevell. According to Lennon, McCartney later assured him that "someone obviously made a huge mistake" and the snub had not been intentional. McCartney provided the handwritten "Jude" motif for Lennon's 2022 album. He also remains friends with May Pang who provided the cover photo for "Jude". He shared his memories of her and his father in Pang's 2022 documentary The Lost Weekend: A Love Story.

Lennon's first step-father, Roberto Bassanini, whom his mother married in 1970, was Italian. Lennon dedicated Photograph Smile to Bassanini in 1998. He is a friend to Albert II, Prince of Monaco.

=== Residence ===
After living with his parents at Kenwood in Weybridge outside London from 1964 to 1968, Lennon moved with his mother to a number of British locales, eventually settling on The Wirral near Liverpool and then to a farm in North Wales. Lennon moved to the United States in the early 1980s where he resided in New York City and then Los Angeles. In 1991, Lennon moved to Europe, and resided mainly in Italy where Bassanini had lived. Lennon then moved to Monaco where he currently resides.

=== Health ===
In 2020, Lennon had a cancerous mole removed from his head. In December 2024, he revealed on The Joe Rogan Experience podcast that he was waiting for the results of a biopsy recently taken from his arm.

== Discography ==
- Valotte (1984)
- The Secret Value of Daydreaming (1986)
- Mr. Jordan (1989)
- Help Yourself (1991)
- Photograph Smile (1998)
- Everything Changes (2011)
- Jude (2022)

== Filmography ==
=== Films ===
As producer

- Whaledreamers (2006)
- Kiss the Ground (2020)
- Women of the White Buffalo (2021)

As actor

- Leaving Las Vegas (1995)

As himself

- Above Us Only Sky (2018)
- The Lost Weekend: A Love Story (2023)

=== Television appearances ===
- Top of the Pops (18 October 1984)
- American Bandstand (29 December 1984)
- Solid Gold (TV series) (2 February 1985)
- Live at Five (18 February 1985)
- Late Night with David Letterman (10 April 1985)
- The Tonight Show Starring Johnny Carson (12 June 1985)
- American Bandstand (26 April 1986)
- Top 20 Countdown (3 May 1986)
- Solid Gold (13 September 1986)
- The Arsenio Hall Show (15 June 1989)
- Today (American TV program) (19 June 1989)
- Late Night with David Letterman (28 July 1989)
- The Tonight Show Starring Johnny Carson (16 August 1989)
- Top of the Pops (3 October 1991)
- Late Night with David Letterman (18 October 1991)
- Late Show with David Letterman (17 February 1999)
- The Tonight Show with Jay Leno (9 March 1999)
- The Howard Stern Show (1 May 1999)
- The Tonight Show with Jay Leno (11 August 1999)
- Daybreak (19 September 2011)
- Larry King Now (16 July 2013)
- Chelsea Lately (28 October 2013)
- The Tonight Show with Jay Leno (21 November 2013)
- The View (19 April 2017)
- Access Hollywood (25 April 2017)
- The Chew (6 April 2018)
- Home and Family (16 April 2018)
- American Chopper (28 March 2019)
- The View (24 April 2019)
- Home and Family (30 April 2019)
- Ways to Change the World (18 November 2022)
- The View (11 March 2025)

== Awards, nominations, and honours ==
=== Music awards ===
Year	Award	Category	Result	Ref.
1985	2nd MTV Video Music Awards	Best New Artist in a Video	Nominated	
1986	28th Annual Grammy Awards	Best New Artist	Nominated	

=== Film awards ===
Year	Award	Category	Nominated work	Result	Ref.
2006	Angel Film Awards	Best Film	Whaledreamers	Won	

=== Honorary awards ===
Year	Organization	Award	Ref.
2020	UNESCO Center for Peace	Cross-Cultural and Peace Crafter Award	
2021	World Literacy Foundation	World Literacy Award	
