= Mark Spiro =

American songwriter (1957–2024)

- Born: March 28, 1957; Seattle, Washington, U.S.
- Origin: Los Angeles, California, U.S.
- Died: March 28, 2024 (aged 67)
- Genres: Pop, rock
- Occupations: Musician, songwriter, record producer
- Instruments: Vocals, guitar, bass, synthesizer, keyboard
- Labels: Interscope, Sony, Empire, A Sun Hill Production AB

Mark Spiro (March 28, 1957 – March 28, 2024) was an American songwriter, record producer and recording artist.

== Career ==
Originally from Seattle, Spiro relocated to Los Angeles to pursue a career within the music industry in his early 20s. While in Los Angeles, he met German record producer/label owner Jack White, after which he spent several years in Germany working as a singer, songwriter, and producer (Laura Branigan, Anne Murray, Engelbert Humperdinck, Pia Zadora, Hazell Dean, David Hasselhoff). Upon his return to Los Angeles in the mid-1980s, he began building a reputation as a successful songwriter with his first major cut on the Top Gun soundtrack and continued to write songs and produce for other artists.

Spiro was one of the first recording artists to be signed by Interscope Records/Jimmy Iovine. Scheduling conflicts/politics resulted in Spiro leaving Interscope Records. He later recorded Care of My Soul, a solo album released in Australia, Scandinavia, and Japan. In September 2012, his brand new Care Of My Soul. Vol. 2 album was released by Sun Hill Production. At the same time an extended version of the Care Of My Soul Vol. 1 album was released. Both CD albums are available in digipack packaging with 8-12 page booklets as well as found on all digital platforms and formats. In late 2012, Spiro co-wrote and produced the duet "Someday" with Julian Lennon and Steven Tyler. Spiro also produced for his daughters Ruby and Summer Spiro, who recorded for Lyric Street Records as the duo Ruby Summer.

In 2020, Frontiers Records released a compilation called 2+2=5: Best of + Rarities which featured the best of his solo material starting from 1996's "Now Is Then, Then is Now", until "It's a Beautiful Life", which was released in 2012 on the German label AOR Heaven.

Spiro announced a new solo album entitled Traveling Cowboys which was released on May 7, 2021, from Frontiers Records. The first single from the album is a duet called "7 Billion People" which featured Julian Lennon and guitarist Tim Pierce.

== Death ==
Spiro died of lung cancer on March 28, 2024, his 67th birthday.

== Discography ==
=== Solo albums ===
- In Stereo (1986, Germany, with a cover version of One for You, One for Me)
- Care Of My Soul (1994, Japan/Australia/Scandinavia)
- Now Is Then, Then Is Now (1996, Europe & Scandinavia)
- Devotion (1998, Europe & Scandinavia)
- The Stuff Dreams Are Made Of (1999, Europe & Scandinavia)
- King of Crows (2003, Europe & Scandinavia)
- Mighty Blue Ocean (2005, Europe & Scandinavia)
- It's a Beautiful Life (January 2012)
- Care Of My Soul Vol. 1 (2012, September 12. (World)
- Care Of My Soul Vol. 2 (2012, September 12. (World)
- Traveling Cowboys (May 2021, World)

=== Collaborations ===
- Steve Perry
- David Lee Roth
- Rick Springfield
- David Cassidy
- Terri Nunn
- Jane Wiedlin
- Julian Lennon

=== Original music for television ===
- One Tree Hill – "Darling It Was You"
- Marker – original music for thirteen episodes
- Fame – "Man in the Mirror"
- Tatort – "Winds Of Change" title song for the episode Das Haus im Wald (1985)

=== Songwriter ===
- Julian Lennon – "Saltwater," Photograph Smile
- True Romance soundtrack – "In Dreams" by John Waite
- Selena soundtrack – "Only Love" by Selena
- Music from Another Room soundtrack – "Day After Day" by Julian Lennon
- Anne Murray – "Are You Still in Love with Me"
- Lila McCann (Multi-Platinum)
- Bad English – "Forget Me Not," "Heaven Is a 4 Letter Word," "Straight to Your Heart," "Pray for Rain," "Life at the Top"
- John Waite – "In Dreams," "How Did I Get By Without You"
- Giant – “I’ll See You in my Dreams”
- Mike Reno
- Heart – "Cruel Tears"
- Cheap Trick – "Mighty Wings" (Top Gun soundtrack), "Ride the Pony"
- REO Speedwagon – "Half Way"
- Emmanuel
- Luis Miguel
- Mr. Big – "Ain't Seen Love Like That," "Not One Night"
- Kansas – "One Man, One Heart"
- Camy Todorow/Kamelia Todorova – "Love is a War"
- Seventh Key – "Broken Home" (originally a Kansas demo from 1986, previously unreleased)
- Margaret Becker – "Light in the Darkness" (The Reckoning, 1988)

== Production credits ==
In addition to eight of his own records, Spiro has produced records for:

- Lila McCann (Produced 2 Records)
- Mike Reno
- John Berry
- María Conchita Alonso
- Anne Murray (Produced 2 Records)
- McAlyster (Produced 1 Record)
- Ruby Summer (Produced 2 Records)
- Leslie & Kelly (Produced 3 Records)
