= Justin Clayton =

English guitarist and singer

Justin Clayton is an English guitarist and singer. He is the lead guitarist for his friend Julian Lennon's band on most of Lennon's albums. In 1999 Justin Clayton released his own solo album Limb produced by Marty Willson-Piper of The Church, which gathered favorable review from CMJ New Music Report, but failed to achieve commercial success.
