= Flashback (Joan Jett album) =

Compilation album by Joan Jett and the Blackhearts
- Released: November 15, 1993
- Recorded: 1979–1993
- Genre: Hard rock; punk rock
- Length: 72:05
- Label: Blackheart
- Producer: Kenny Laguna; Ritchie Cordell; Jimmy Iovine; Thom Panunzio; John Aiosa; Joan Jett; Rick Rubin; George Drakoulias

Joan Jett and the Blackhearts chronology
Notorious (1991)	Flashback (1993)	Pure and Simple (1994)

Professional ratings
Review scores
Source	Rating
AllMusic	4.5/5 stars
Robert Christgau	A−

Flashback is a compilation album of outtakes and rare songs released by American rock singer Joan Jett and her backing band the Blackhearts. The album was initially released on November 15, 1993 and was reissued in 1998 with a slightly different track listing. The 1998 version dropped five tracks from the 1993 release: "Summertime Blues", "Louie Louie", "Star Star", "Stand Up for Yourself" and "Call Me Lightning" and replaced them with "Real Wild Child (Wild One)", a live version of "Bad Reputation" and "Right 'Til the End", which was only available on the cassette version of the 1993 release. "Call Me Lightning" and "Summertime Blues" were later added as bonus tracks on reissues of Bad Reputation (1980) and "Louie Louie" became a bonus track on the reissue of I Love Rock 'n Roll (1981). "Star Star" was included as an unlisted "surprise" track on the 1983 cassette release of Album, but was later removed after the original cassette was pulled from some stores because of non-labelled "explicit" track lyrics. The song was restored on the CD release.

== Track listings ==
No.	Title	Writer(s)	Year of recording	Length
1.	"Hide and Seek" (Bunker Hill cover)	David Walker	1984	2:40
2.	"Summertime Blues" (Eddie Cochran cover)	Eddie Cochran; Jerry Capehart	1981	2:15
3.	"Indian Giver" (1910 Fruitgum Company cover)	Bobby Bloom; Ritchie Cordell; Bo Gentry	1990	3:06
4.	"I Hate Long Goodbyes"	Joan Jett; Kenny Laguna	1984	2:26
5.	"Cherry Bomb" (The Runaways cover, live featuring L7)	Jett; Kim Fowley	1992	3:57
6.	"Fantasy"	Jett; Laguna	1984	4:16
7.	"Light of Day" (from the soundtrack of the film Light of Day)	Bruce Springsteen	1986	3:32
8.	"Gotcha" (written for the soundtrack of the film Gotcha!)	Jett; Janna Allen	1985	3:01
9.	"She Lost You" (The Zephyrs cover, from the soundtrack of the film Less than Zero)	Pete Gage	1987	2:55
10.	"MCA (EMI)" (Sex Pistols cover)	Steve Jones; Paul Cook; Glen Matlock; John Lydon	1984	3:14
11.	"Louie Louie" (Richard Berry cover)	Richard Berry	1981	2:57
12.	"Star Star" (The Rolling Stones cover)	Mick Jagger; Keith Richards	1983	3:58
13.	"Rebel Rebel" (David Bowie cover)	David Bowie	1983	4:10
14.	"Be My Lover" (Alice Cooper cover)	Michael Bruce	1990	2:57
15.	"Bring It On Home" (Sam Cooke cover)	Sam Cooke	1984	3:23
16.	"Play with Me"	Jett; Laguna	1985	3:19
17.	"Activity Grrrl"	Jett; Laguna	1993	3:34
18.	"Heartbeat"	Jett; Allen	1985	3:11
19.	"Stand Up for Yourself"	Jett; Laguna	1984	3:53
20.	"Black Leather" (original demo)	Jett; Reggie Griffin; Eddie Morris; William Adler	1986	3:59
21.	"Call Me Lightning" (The Who cover)	Pete Townshend	1979	2:24
22.	"I Love Rock 'n Roll" (Arrows cover, featuring Steve Jones and Paul Cook)	Alan Merrill; Jake Hooker	1979	2:58
Total length:				72:05

Cassette version bonus track
No.	Title	Writer(s)	Year of recording	Length
23.	"Right 'Til the End"	Jett; Jules Shear	1987	3:55

1998 Edition
No.	Title	Writer(s)	Year of recording	Length
1.	"Real Wild Child (Wild One)"	Johnny Greenan; Johnny O'Keefe; Dave Owens; Tony Withers	1997	1:36
2.	"Hide and Seek"			2:40
3.	"Indian Giver"			3:06
4.	"I Hate Long Goodbyes"			2:26
5.	"Cherry Bomb" (live)			3:57
6.	"Fantasy"			4:16
7.	"Light of Day"			3:32
8.	"Gotcha"			3:01
9.	"She Lost You"			2:55
10.	"MCA (EMI)"			3:14
11.	"Rebel, Rebel"			4:10
12.	"Be My Lover"			2:57
13.	"Bring It On Home"			3:23
14.	"Play with Me"			3:19
15.	"Activity Grrrl"			3:34
16.	"Heartbeat"			3:11
17.	"Bad Reputation" (live)	Jett; Cordell; Laguna; Marty Kupersmith	1981	3:02
18.	"Black Leather"			3:59
19.	"I Love Rock 'n Roll"			2:58
20.	"Right 'Til the End"			3:18

== Production ==
- Kenny Laguna – producer on tracks 1–4, 6–8, 10–21, 23, 1 (98), 17 (98)
- Ritchie Cordell – producer on tracks 2, 11, 12, 21
- Joan Jett and L7 – producers on track 5
- Jimmy Iovine – producer on tracks 7, 10, 19
- Rick Rubin, George Drakoulias – producers on track 9
- Thom Panunzio – producer on tracks 16, 17
- Joan Jett – producer on tracks 18, 1 (98)
- John Aiosa – producer on tracks 18, 20
- Reggie Griffin, Scorpio – producers on track 20
- Steve Jones, Paul Cook – producers on track 22
- Tony Bruno – producer on track 1 (98)
