= Glorious Results of a Misspent Youth =

Studio album by Joan Jett and the Blackhearts
- Released: October 1, 1984
- Studio: Record Plant (New York City); Power Station (New York City); Kingdom Sound (Syosset, New York)
- Genre: Hard rock; power pop
- Length: 38:13
- Label: Blackheart; MCA
- Producer: Ritchie Cordell; Jimmy Iovine; Chris Kimsey; Kenny Laguna; Thom Panunzio

Joan Jett and the Blackhearts chronology
Album (1983)	Glorious Results of a Misspent Youth (1984)	Good Music (1986)

Singles from Glorious Results of a Misspent Youth
- 1. "I Love You Love Me Love" Released: 1984; 2. "I Need Someone" Released: May 1984

Professional ratings
Review scores
Source	Rating
AllMusic	4/5 stars
Robert Christgau	B+

Glorious Results of a Misspent Youth is the fourth studio album by American rock singer Joan Jett and the third to feature her backing band the Blackhearts. The album was released on October 1, 1984 by Blackheart and MCA Records, and was reissued in 1998 with seven bonus tracks. The title of the album was taken from a line of dialogue in an episode of the 1950s television sitcom The Honeymooners.

== Background ==
MCA Records had trouble pulling a successful single from the album. They released two music videos for the songs "I Need Someone" and "I Love You Love Me Love" (its title shortened to "I Love You Love"), but only "I Love You Love" was released in the 7-inch format (backed with a live version of "Talkin' 'Bout My Baby"). In the UK, "I Need Someone" was released as a 12-inch single, but the vocal differed from the album version. "Cherry Bomb" was remixed by Mark S. Berry and released as a promotional 12-inch single in the US on red vinyl, coupled with an instrumental titled "Bombs Away". The record sleeve featured Jett firing up a large plastic cherry with a Bic lighter. "Hide and Seek" and "I Can't Control Myself" were produced by Thom Panunzio and Kenny Laguna. Both originally appeared on the Venezuelan release of the Glorious Results of a Misspent Youth album (which was titled I Need Someone for that country). "Bird Dog" was produced by Kenny Laguna. It originally appeared as the B-side of the British 12" single, "I Love You Love Me Love".

A live version of "Talkin' 'Bout My Baby" was produced by John Aiosa and Kenny Laguna and originally appeared as the B-side of "I Love You Love Me Love". It was recorded live at CBGB in New York City on October 11, 1984.

== Track listing ==
=== Original release ===
Side one
No.	Title	Writer(s)	Length
1.	"Cherry Bomb" (The Runaways cover)	Joan Jett; Kim Fowley	2:35
2.	"I Love You Love Me Love" (Gary Glitter cover)	Gary Glitter; Mike Leander	3:18
3.	"Frustrated"	Jett; Kenny Laguna	4:37
4.	"Hold Me"	Jett; Ricky Byrd; Laguna	3:11
5.	"Long Time"	Jett; Laguna	2:27
6.	"Talkin' 'Bout My Baby"	Jett; Byrd; Laguna	3:37

Side two
No.	Title	Writer(s)	Length
7.	"I Need Someone" (The Belmonts cover)	Peter Falciglia; Carlo Mastrangelo	3:15
8.	"Love Like Mine"	Jett; Laguna	4:01
9.	"New Orleans" (Gary U.S. Bonds cover)	Joseph Royster; Frank Guida	2:54
10.	"Someday"	Jett; Byrd; Laguna	2:47
11.	"Push and Stomp"	Jett; Byrd; Laguna	3:03
12.	"I Got No Answers"	Jett; Laguna	2:27
Total length:			38:13

1998 CD edition bonus tracks
No.	Title	Writer(s)	Length
13.	"Hide and Seek" (Bunker Hill cover)	David Walker	2:40
14.	"I Can't Control Myself" (The Troggs cover)	Reg Presley	3:26
15.	"Bird Dog" (The Everly Brothers cover)	Boudleaux Bryant	2:42
16.	"Talkin' Bout My Baby" (live)	Jett; Byrd; Laguna	3:51
17.	"Bombs Away"	Jett; Fowley	4:04
18.	"Cherry Bomb" (dance mix)	Falciglia; Mastrangelo	4:17
19.	"I Need Someone" (dance mix)	Jett; Fowley	2:43

=== Venezuelan edition (I Need Someone) ===
1. "Bomba De Cereza" (Cherry Bomb)
2. "Nueva Orleans" (New Orleans)
3. "Hablando Sobre Mi Bebe" (Talkin' 'Bout My Baby)
4. "Mucho Tiempo" (Long Time)
5. "Necesito Alguien" (I Need Someone)
6. "Frustrada" (Frustrated)
7. "Empuja Y Zapatea" (Push and Stomp)
8. "No Puedo Controlarme" (I Can't Control Myself)
9. "Amor Como El Mio" (Love Like Mine)
10. "Algun Dia" (Someday)
11. "Esconde Y Busca" (Hide and Seek)

== Personnel ==
Joan Jett and the Blackhearts

- Joan Jett – lead vocals, rhythm guitar
- Ricky Byrd – lead guitar, backing vocals
- Gary Ryan – bass, backing vocals
- Lee Crystal – drums, backing vocals

Additional musicians

- The Uptown Horns:
  - Crispin Choe – baritone saxophone
  - Robert Funk – trombone
  - Arno Hecht – tenor saxophone
  - Paul Litteral – trumpet
- The Ross Levinson Strings directed by Ross Levinson
- Jack Baskow – saxophone
- Gary U.S. Bonds – backing vocals on track 9

Production

- Kenny Laguna – producer on all tracks
- Ritchie Cordell – producer on tracks 2, 5–8, 10
- Chris Kimsey – producer on track 11
- Thom Panunzio – producer on tracks 1, 3, 4, 9, 12–14, 17, 19, engineer, mixing
- Jimmy Iovine – producer on tracks 2, 4, 7, 12, production consultant
- John Aiosa – producer on track 16
- Shelly Yakus – engineer on tracks 2, 4, 7, 12
- Jim Ball, John Devlin, Gray Russell – additional engineering
- Tom Swift, Carol Cafiero, Bruce Lampcov – assistant engineers
- Bob Ludwig – mastering at Masterdisk, New York
- Album design – Spencer Drate and Judith Salavetz
- Art direction – Meryl Laguna

== Charts ==
Chart (1984)	Peak position
US Billboard 200	67
