= Bad Reputation (Joan Jett album) =

Studio album by Joan Jett
- Released: May 17, 1980 (Joan Jett); January 23, 1981 (Bad Reputation)
- Recorded: March 1979 – March 1980
- Studios: Chappell Recording and Ramport (London, England); Fidelity (North Hollywood, Los Angeles)
- Genres: Punk rock; new wave; glam rock
- Length: 38:31
- Labels: Ariola; Blackheart; (Joan Jett); Boardwalk (Bad Reputation)
- Producers: Kenny Laguna; Ritchie Cordell; Mark Dodson; Steve Jones; Paul Cook

Joan Jett chronology
Bad Reputation (1980)	I Love Rock 'n Roll (1981)

Singles from Bad Reputation
- 1. "You Don't Own Me" / "I Love Rock 'n' Roll" Released: 1979; 2. "Make Believe" / "Call Me Lightning" Released: 1980; 3. "You Don't Know What You've Got" / "Don't Abuse Me" Released: 1980; 4. "Bad Reputation" / "Jezebel" Released: 1981; 5. "Do You Wanna Touch Me (Oh Yeah)" / "Victim of Circumstance" Released: 1982

Bad Reputation is the debut solo studio album by American rock singer Joan Jett. It was originally released independently on May 17, 1980 as an eponymous album after her previous band the Runaways had disbanded the previous year. After Jett signed a recording contract with Boardwalk Records, the album was re-released worldwide with the new title on January 23, 1981. The album was positively received by critics and reached No. 51 on the U.S. Billboard 200.

== Background ==
Record producer Kenny Laguna financed the album's recording sessions using borrowed studio credits. Recorded before Joan Jett formed the Blackhearts, the majority of the album featured Jett backed by members of the Roll-Ups, with Lea Hart on guitar, Jeff Peters on bass guitar and Paul Simmons on drums. Other tracks include more prominent musicians like guitarist Steve Jones and drummer Paul Cook of Sex Pistols, and Blondie members Clem Burke on drums and Frank Infante on guitar. Laguna performed on piano and organ.

After independently recording the album with Laguna, Jett took the record to a number of major record labels but none were interested in releasing the project. Laguna and Jett eventually decided to fund the pressing of the album themselves. The original, self-released, version of the album was simply titled Joan Jett. Laguna sold copies directly to concert-goers and record stores.

The album sold relatively well, prompting its re-release a year later as Bad Reputation on Boardwalk Records, with a slightly rearranged song order. Jett said the new title referred to the bad reputation that she had as a former member of the Runaways.

When the album's European rights were secured through Ariola, "Hanky Panky" replaced "Wooly Bully" as the final song on side two. When the album was issued through Boardwalk Records in the U.S. under the title Bad Reputation, the label stuck with "Wooly Bully" as the final track, making the "Hanky Panky" import version a collector's item. However, the song was later included as a bonus track on CD re-releases.

The original Australian release featured a completely different cover, and "Hanky Panky" replaced "Shout" as track 9. "Do You Wanna Touch Me (Oh Yeah)" was also a hit in Australia when it was released hot on the heels of "I Love Rock 'n' Roll" and "Crimson and Clover" from Jett's second studio album, I Love Rock 'n Roll (1981).

In 1999, the album was again re-issued, this time on CD with several bonus tracks and a remastered version of the original album. All subsequent reissues feature the tracks in their original pre-Boardwalk release order.

== Singles ==
- "You Don't Own Me" was released in Europe as a single prior to the album in 1979. The B-side was an early version of "I Love Rock 'n Roll" performed with Cook and Jones. This B-side version was later released on the rarities album Flashback (1993).
- "Make Believe" was released as a 7-inch single on the Ariola label. The record was accompanied by a fold-out mini-poster sleeve featuring the album cover photo. The B-side was a cover version of "Call Me Lightning" which also turned up on Flashback as well as CD versions of Bad Reputation.
- An edited version of "You Don't Know What You've Got" b/w "Don't Abuse Me" (and one b/w "I'm Gonna Run Away" with both credited to Joan Jett and the Blackhearts) was released in a few European countries.
- "Do You Wanna Touch Me (Oh Yeah)" was released by Boardwalk following the success of Jett's versions of "I Love Rock 'n' Roll" and "Crimson and Clover". The B-side was "Victim of Circumstance" which was culled from the later album. It was paired with various other B-sides in other markets.
- Boardwalk also released "You Don't Own Me" credited to Joan Jett and the Blackhearts (b/w "Jezebel" as Joan Jett) in the US and Canada, which had been successful overseas sometime before October, 1981, but it was largely ignored by US rock radio.
- Ariola released "Bad Reputation" as a single in Germany. B-side, "You Don't Know What You've Got".

== Critical reception ==
Professional ratings
Review scores
Source	Rating
AllMusic	4/5 stars
Rolling Stone	4/5 stars
The Village Voice	A−

Reviewing Bad Reputation in 1981, Robert Christgau of The Village Voice said, "Producers Kenny Laguna and Ritchie Cordell make the old glitter formula of readymade riffs 'n' blare sound suitable for albums, and they get plenty of help from reformed Runaway Jett, who has writing credit on four of these twelve tunes and comes on tuffer than any gurl in history." Tom Carson of Rolling Stone found that Bad Reputation "is flawed by its literal-mindedness – the arrangements pump along gamely yet rarely swing or soar – and by some unresourceful material", but concluded that "in its mood and feel", the album "is a determined retelling of what sometimes seems like the truest rock story there is."

In a retrospective review, AllMusic critic Steve Huey described Bad Reputation as "an infectious romp through her influences, ranging from classic '50s and '60s rock & roll through glam rock, three-chord loud'n'fast Ramones punk, and poppier new wave guitar rock." Rolling Stone placed Bad Reputation at No. 36 on its list of the "50 Coolest Albums of All Time" in 2002.

== Track listing ==
Side one
No.	Title	Writer(s)	Length
1.	"Bad Reputation"	Joan Jett; Kenny Laguna; Ritchie Cordell; Marty Joe Kupersmith	2:49
2.	"Make Believe"	Bo Gentry; Joey Levine	3:11
3.	"You Don't Know What You've Got"	Jett; Laguna; Cordell	3:44
4.	"You Don't Own Me"	John Madara; David White	3:27
5.	"Too Bad on Your Birthday"	Charlie Karp; Arthur Resnick	2:58
6.	"Do You Wanna Touch Me (Oh Yeah) (Note: "Do You Wanna Touch Me (Oh Yeah)" listed on the 1st edition cover as "Touch Me")"	Gary Glitter; Mike Leander	3:48

Side two
No.	Title	Writer(s)	Length
7.	"Shout"	O'Kelly Isley Jr.; Ronald Isley; Rudolph Isley	2:48
8.	"Let Me Go"	Jett; Laguna; Cordell	2:42
9.	"Doing Alright with the Boys"	Glitter; Leander	3:38
10.	"Jezebel"	Jett; Laguna	3:28
11.	"Don't Abuse Me"	Jett	3:38
12.	"Wooly Bully (Note: "Wooly Bully" was misspelled on the 1st edition cover as "Wully Bully")"	Domingo Samudio	2:20
Total length:			38:31

1992 CD edition bonus tracks
No.	Title	Writer(s)	Length
13.	"Call Me Lightning"	Pete Townshend	2:25
14.	"Hanky Panky"	Jeff Barry; Ellie Greenwich	3:32
15.	"Summertime Blues"	Eddie Cochran; Jerry Capehart	2:23
16.	"What Can I Do for You?"	Laguna	2:12

2006 CD edition bonus tracks
No.	Title	Writer(s)	Length
13.	"Call Me Lightning"	Townshend	2:25
14.	"Hanky Panky"	Barry; Greenwich	3:32
15.	"What Can I Do for You?"	Laguna	2:12
16.	"You Don't Own Me" (Previously Unreleased Version)	Madara; White	2:41
17.	"Bad Reputation (Note: "Bad Reputation" was live with "the Remains" of the Ramones)"	Jett; Laguna; Cordell; Kupersmith	2:57

== Personnel ==
Joan Jett & the Roll-Ups

- Joan Jett – lead vocals, rhythm guitar (1–5, 9, 11); backing vocals (2, 3, 5–11), lead guitar (1, 2), guitar (6–8, 10, 12)
- Lea Hart – lead guitar (5, 9), rhythm guitar (1, 2, 9), guitar (6–8, 10, 12), backing vocals (6, 9)
- Jeff Peters – bass (1, 2, 5–10), backing vocals (6, 9)
- Kenny Laguna – piano (1–3, 5–10, 12), tambourine (1, 2), Clavinet (8, 10), organ (8, 10), backing vocals (1–3, 5–7, 9, 10, 12)
- Paul Simmons – drums (1, 2, 5–10), backing vocals (6)

Additional musicians

- Buzz Chandler – lead guitar (2)
- Frank Infante – lead guitar (2, 12, 13)
- Lou Maxfield – lead guitar (3, 15)
- Sean Tyla – twelve-string acoustic guitar (10)
- Steve Jones – lead guitar (4, 11), rhythm guitars (4), bass (4, 11)
- Eric Ambel – guitar; backing vocals on track 16 (2006)
- Jeff Bannister – piano (4, 11)
- Richard D'Andrea – bass (3, 15)
- Micky Groome – bass guitar (12, 13)
- Clem Burke – drums (12, 13)
- Paul Cook – drums (4, 11)
- Joel Turrisi – drums (3) and 15
- Johnny Earle – saxophone (6, 7, 10)
- Mick Eve – saxophone (4, 11)
- Commander Goonwaddle – tubular bells (8)
- Ritchie Cordell – backing vocals (1, 2, 5–7, 9), knee slaps (8), chest slaps & "hysterics" (12)
- Martyn Watson – backing vocals (1)
- Rainbeaux Smith – backing vocals (3) (credited as Rainbow Smith)
- Johnny Gash – backing vocals (9)

Production

- Kenny Laguna – production
- Ritchie Cordell – production, photography
- Mark Dodson – engineering; associate producer
- Steve Jones – producer of tracks 4 and 11
- Paul Cook – producer of tracks 4 and 11
- Joe Latimer – engineer
- Stuart Panes – engineer
- Butch Yates – assistant engineer
- Malcolm Davies – mastering

== Charts ==
Chart (1982)	Peak position
Australian Albums (Kent Music Report)	45
Canada Top Albums/CDs (RPM)	76
US Billboard 200	51
