= Down in the Bunker =

Studio album by Steve Gibbons Band
- Released: 1978
- Studio: Good Earth (London)
- Genres: Rock and roll; country
- Language: English
- Label: Polydor
- Producers: Bobby Pridden; Tony Visconti

Steve Gibbons Band chronology
Rollin' On (1977)	Down in the Bunker (1978)	Street Parade (1980)

Down in the Bunker is the third studio album by the Steve Gibbons Band. The album was produced by Tony Visconti. The reissue tracks were produced by Bobby Priden, who is best known for working with the Who.

The song "Any Road Up" did not appear on the band's earlier-released album of the same title.

== Critical reception ==
Professional ratings
Review scores
Source	Rating
Christgau's Record Guide	A−
Mojo	4/5 stars

The Globe and Mail deemed the album "smooth, if not eccentric country songs and the odd ballad, all brought into sharp relief by a particularly burning rock and roll."

== Track listing ==
All tracks composed by Steve Gibbons

1. "No Spitting On the Bus"
2. "Any Road Up"
3. "Down in the Bunker"
4. "Big J.C."
5. "Mary Ain't Goin' Home"
6. "Down in the City"
7. "Let's Do It Again"
8. "Eddy Vortex"
9. "Chelita"
10. "When You Get Outside"
11. "Grace"

== 1988 Reissue tracks ==
All tracks composed by Steve Gibbons except where stated

1. "Tulane" (Chuck Berry)
2. "Gold Coast"
3. "Body Talk"
4. "Let Me Go"
5. "Satisfying Moves" (R. Ireson, Trevor Ireson)
6. "I Am Here"
7. "The Great Escape"
8. "Get Up and Dance"

== Personnel ==
The Steve Gibbons Band

- Steve Gibbons - acoustic guitar, electric guitar, rhythm guitar, harmonica, vocals
- Trevor Burton - bass, piano, vocals, backing vocals
- Bob Wilson - electric guitar, electric piano, bass, Moog synthesizer, acoustic guitar, organ, 12-string guitar, backing vocals
- Bob Lamb - drums, percussion

with:

- Nick Pentelow - saxophone
- Tony Visconti - bass
- Dave Carroll - fiddle, lap steel guitar, backing vocals
- Harry Rix - drums
- Robbie Blunt - guitar

Technical

- John Shaw - cover photography
