= I Love Rock 'n' Roll (disambiguation) =

"I Love Rock 'n' Roll" is a song by Arrows made famous by Joan Jett & the Blackhearts, covered by multiple artists. It may also refer to:

- I Love Rock 'n Roll (album), the second album by Joan Jett & the Blackhearts
- "I Love Rock 'n' Roll" (The Jesus and Mary Chain song)
- "I Love Rock and Roll", a song by Status Quo from the album 1+9+8+2
