= Good Music (Joan Jett and the Blackhearts album) =

Studio album by Joan Jett and the Blackhearts
- Released: December 9, 1986
- Studio: Record Plant (New York City); Nino Studios (Baldwin, New York); Broccoli Rabe (Fairfield, New Jersey); Kingdom Sound Studios (Syosset, New York)
- Genre: Hard rock; power pop
- Length: 37:19
- Label: Blackheart; CBS Associated; (US and Japan); Polydor (Europe)
- Producer: Kenny Laguna; Thom Panunzio; John Aiosa; Mark S. Berry; Larry Smith; Reggie Griffin

Joan Jett and the Blackhearts chronology
Glorious Results of a Misspent Youth (1984)	Good Music (1986)	Up Your Alley (1988)

Singles from Good Music
- 1. "Good Music" / "Fantasy" Released: 1986

Professional ratings
Review scores
Source	Rating
AllMusic	3/5 stars
Robert Christgau	B+
Rolling Stone	(mixed)

Good Music is the fifth studio album by American rock singer Joan Jett and the fourth to feature her backing band the Blackhearts. It was released on December 9, 1986 by Blackheart and CBS Associated Records in the U.S. and Japan, and Polydor Records in the UK. The album's working title was Contact, after the final song off the album (hence the contact print of photographs on the cover), but it was changed to Good Music in its final stages. It peaked at No. 105 on the U.S. Billboard 200, being her first album to miss the Top 100.

== Background ==
"Fantasy" was also recorded for this album but was instead featured as the non-LP B-side to the "Good Music" single, which peaked at No. 83 on the Billboard Hot 100. It also appeared on Jett's compilation album of outtakes and rare songs, Flashback (1993). Carl Wilson, Al Jardine, Bruce Johnston and Mike Love of the Beach Boys sang backing vocals on "Good Music", and she covered their 1964 song "Fun, Fun, Fun".

The song "This Means War" also appeared on the concurrently released soundtrack to Joan Jett's debut movie, Light of Day (1987), starring Michael J. Fox.

A music video was shot for the shortened single mix of "Good Music", following Joan Jett around New York City. Jett is seen in her limousine throwing 'bad music' cassette tapes out the window, as well as playing guitar in her loft and even washing her hair in the shower. It climaxed with an in-concert appearance with her band at CBGB, however the video was rarely played on MTV.

== Track listing ==
Side one
No.	Title	Writer(s)	Length
1.	"Good Music"	Joan Jett; Kenny Laguna	5:45
2.	"This Means War"	Jett; Bob Halligan Jr.; Laguna	3:37
3.	"Roadrunner" (The Modern Lovers cover)	Jonathan Richman	3:33
4.	"If Ya Want My Luv"	Jett; Laguna	3:53
5.	"Fun, Fun, Fun" (The Beach Boys cover)	Brian Wilson; Mike Love	2:19

Side two
No.	Title	Writer(s)	Length
6.	"Black Leather"	Jett; Reggie Griffin; Eddie Morris; William Adler	3:59
7.	"Outlaw"	Jett; Laguna; Halligan Jr.; Ricky Byrd	4:16
8.	"Just Lust"	Terry Abrahamson; Rick Nowels	3:16
9.	"You Got Me Floatin'" (The Jimi Hendrix Experience cover)	Jimi Hendrix	3:30
10.	"Contact"	Jett; Laguna	3:11
Total length:			37:19

== Personnel ==
Joan Jett and the Blackhearts

- Joan Jett – lead vocals, rhythm guitar
- Ricky Byrd – lead guitar, backing vocals
- Gary Ryan – bass, backing vocals
- Lee Crystal – drums
- Kasim Sulton – bass, backing vocals
- Thommy Price – drums

Additional musicians

- Bob Halligan Jr. – guitar, piano, backing vocals
- Reggie Griffin – guitar, bass, drums
- Rick Knowles – guitar
- Michael Rudetsky – keyboards
- Ronnie Lawson – keyboards
- Dennis Feldman – bass
- Jimmy Bralower – drums
- Ross Levinson – violin
- Bashiri Johnson – percussion
- Nelson Williams – percussion
- Thom Panunzio – percussion
- Larry Smith – percussion
- Darlene Love – backing vocals and vocal arrangements
- Billy Hinsche – backing vocals on "Good Music"
- Bobby Figueroa – backing vocals on "Good Music"
- Kenny Laguna – various instruments and backing vocals
- The Beach Boys:
  - Carl Wilson – backing vocals on "Good Music"
  - Al Jardine – backing vocals on "Good Music"
  - Bruce Johnston – backing vocals on "Good Music"
  - Mike Love – backing vocals on "Good Music"
- The Uptown Horns:
  - Crispin Choe – baritone saxophone
  - Robert Funk – trombone
  - Arno Hecht – tenor saxophone
  - Paul Litteral – trumpet

Production

- Kenny Laguna – producer on all tracks
- Thom Panunzio – producer on all tracks, engineer, mixing
- Mark S. Berry – producer on tracks 4 and 9
- Larry Smith – producer on track 6
- Reggie Griffin – producer on track 6
- John Aiosa – associate producer, additional engineering
- Tom Swift – additional engineering
- Gray Russell – additional engineering
- Jim Ball – additional engineering
- Bob Ludwig – mastering at Masterdisk, New York

== Charts ==
Chart (1986)	Peak position
US Billboard 200	105
