= Album (Joan Jett album) =

Studio album by Joan Jett and the Blackhearts
- Released: July 1983
- Recorded: 1983
- Studio: Kingdom Sound (Syosset, New York)
- Genres: Hard rock; punk rock
- Length: 34:59 (LP); 39:01 (cassette)
- Labels: Blackheart; MCA
- Producers: Joan Jett; Ritchie Cordell; Kenny Laguna; Glen Kolotkin

Joan Jett and the Blackhearts chronology
| I Love Rock 'n Roll (1981) | Album (1983) | Glorious Results of a Misspent Youth (1984) |

Singles from Album
- 1. "Fake Friends" Released: July 1983; 2. "The French Song" Released: July 1983 (Canada only); 3. "Everyday People" Released: 1983

Professional ratings
Review scores
| Source | Rating |
|---|---|
| AllMusic | 4.5/5 stars |
| Metal Forces | 4/10 |
| Rolling Stone | 3/5 stars |
| The Village Voice | B+ |

Album is the third studio album by American rock singer Joan Jett and the second to feature her backing band the Blackhearts. It was released in July 1983 by Blackheart and MCA Records.

== Background and recording ==
Unlike Joan Jett's previous two studio albums, only three tracks are cover songs, "Everyday People", "Tossin' and Turnin'", and a re-recording of the Runaways "I Love Playing with Fire", though this had not been the original plan. During the recording of the album, Jett commented, "I know what's going to happen. When we included lots of covers, people would call us on it. If we don't they'd say, 'Where's the covers?'"

== Release ==
The cassette tape version had two different issues, one issued in a regular black plastic case (MCA MCAC-5437) and one issued in a red plastic case (MCA MCAC-5445). The initial version contained the Rolling Stones song "Star Star" on it as a hidden track at the end of side one. The second version deleted the song and was designated as "Album Version Only". The album was re-released in 1992 with six more bonus tracks.

The first single released from the album was the lead track "Fake Friends". The U.S. 7-inch vinyl featured "Nitetime" on the reverse side, with a locked groove at the end of the song. This meant that jukeboxes playing the track would have to be manually ejected. The CD bonus track "Locked Groove" is an actual recording of the end of the single. A second issue with "Handyman" as the B-side was sent to distributors. A music video was shot for "Fake Friends" where Joan Jett and the Blackhearts are continually mobbed by 'fans' and hangers-on who quickly turn into cardboard cut-outs and fall over. It received heavy airplay on MTV, though the song was a relative disappointment on the U.S. Billboard Hot 100, peaking at No. 35. Kenny Laguna later told Creem magazine that he had objected to "Fake Friends" being the first single, as it wasn't a natural fit for rock radio, but was rebuffed by the label.

The second single, "Everyday People" (backed with "Why Can't We Be Happy") fared no better, peaking at No. 37. The release was accompanied by a slapstick music video in which Jett is plagued by calamity, including a smoking hair-dryer, a defective alarm clock, and a collapsing bed. Promotional 7-inch and 12-inch records of the song were sent to radio stations featuring the longer "Dance Mix"; and the commercial 12-inch record featured the notorious "Star Star" on the B-side.

A third music video was filmed for "The French Song", but MTV gave it scant airtime and a single was only released in Canada, where it was backed with "Coney Island Whitefish".

== Track listing ==
Side one
| No. | Title | Writer(s) | Length |
|---|---|---|---|
| 1. | "Fake Friends" | Joan Jett; Kenny Laguna | 3:23 |
| 2. | "Handyman" | Jett; Laguna | 3:23 |
| 3. | "Everyday People" (Sly and the Family Stone cover) | Sylvester Stewart | 2:40 |
| 4. | "A Hundred Feet Away" | Jett; Laguna; Peter Anders | 2:33 |
| 5. | "Secret Love" | Jett; Laguna | 4:03 |

Side two
| No. | Title | Writer(s) | Length |
|---|---|---|---|
| 6. | "The French Song" | Jett; Laguna; Ricky Byrd; Mike Winter Jr. | 3:35 |
| 7. | "Tossin' and Turnin'" (Bobby Lewis cover) | Ritchie Adams; Malou Rene | 2:25 |
| 8. | "Why Can't We Be Happy" | Jett; Laguna | 3:53 |
| 9. | "I Love Playing with Fire" (The Runaways Re-Recording) | Jett | 3:03 |
| 10. | "Coney Island Whitefish" | Jett; Laguna | 3:35 |
| 11. | "Had Enough" | Jett; Laguna; Byrd | 2:26 |
| Total length: | | | 34:59 |

First cassette version bonus track
| No. | Title | Writer(s) | Length |
|---|---|---|---|
| 6. | "Star Star" | Jagger–Richards | 4:00 |
| Total length: | | | 39:01 |

1992 CD edition bonus tracks
| No. | Title | Writer(s) | Length |
|---|---|---|---|
| 13. | "Nitetime" | Jett; Laguna | 4:52 |
| 14. | "Everyday People" (Dance Mix) | Sylvester Stewart | 4:19 |
| 15. | "Wait for Me" (The Runaways cover) | Jett | 4:33 |
| 16. | "Who Can You Trust" | Jett; Laguna; Stephen Lunt | 2:51 |
| 17. | "Scratch My Back" | Jett; Laguna; Lunt | 4:13 |
| 18. | "Locked Groove" | Jett; Laguna; Byrd | 3:47 |

== Personnel ==
Joan Jett and the Blackhearts

- Joan Jett – lead vocals, rhythm guitar
- Ricky Byrd – lead guitar, backing vocals
- Gary Ryan – bass, backing vocals
- Lee Crystal – drums, backing vocals

Additional musicians

- The Uptown Horns:
  - Crispin Choe – baritone sax
  - Robert Funk – trombone
  - Arno Hecht – tenor sax
  - Paul Litteral – trumpet
- The Ross Levinson Strings directed by Ross Levinson
- Kenny Laguna – keyboards, backing vocals

Production

- Ritchie Cordell, Kenny Laguna – production
- Greg Kolotkin – associate production
- Ron Cote – engineering
- Bob Ludwig – mastering

Design

- Album design – Spencer Drate, Judith Salavetz
- Art direction – Meryl Laguna, Joan Jett
- Photography – Dieter Zill

== Charts ==
Chart performance for Album
| Chart (1983) | Peak position |
|---|---|
| Australian Albums (Kent Music Report) | 85 |
| Canada Top Albums/CDs (RPM) | 48 |
| Norwegian Albums (VG-lista) | 19 |
| Swedish Albums (Sverigetopplistan) | 29 |
| US Billboard 200 | 20 |
| US Rock Albums (Billboard) | 15 |

== Certifications ==
Certifications for Album
| Region | Certification | Certified units/sales |
|---|---|---|
| United States (RIAA) | Gold | 500,000^{^} |
^{^} Shipments figures based on certification alone.
