= Rollin' On =

Studio album by Steve Gibbons Band
- Released: 1977
- Studios: Eel Pie Studios, London
- Genres: Rock; blues; rock and roll; folk; jazz; country; R&B
- Language: English
- Label: Polydor
- Producer: Ken Laguna

Steve Gibbons Band chronology
Any Road Up (1976)	Rollin' On (1977)	Down in the Bunker (1978)

Rollin' On is the second studio album by the Steve Gibbons Band.

== Track listing ==
All tracks composed by Steve Gibbons, except where indicated.

1. "Wild Flowers"
2. "Light Up Your Face"
3. "Now You Know Me"
4. "Mr. Jones"
5. "Till The Well Runs Dry"
6. "Tulane" (Chuck Berry)
7. "Low Down Man"
8. "Till the Fire Burns Out"
9. "Cross Me Over the Road"
10. "Right Side of Heaven"
11. "Rollin' On"
12. "Please Don't Say Goodbye"
13. "Tupelo Mississippi Flash" (Jerry Reed)
14. "Rounden" (Note: The sleeve notes and label on the original album release credit "Rounden" as written by the Steve Gibbons Band, but BMI Records (see BMI Work #4293407) lists Steve Gibbons as its sole writer.)

== Personnel ==
The Steve Gibbons Band

- Steve Gibbons - lead vocals
- Trevor Burton - bass, backing vocals, additional lead vocals on "Right Side of Heaven" and "Rounden"
- Dave Carroll - guitar, backing vocals, additional lead vocals on "Right Side of Heaven" and "Rounden"
- Bob Lamb - drums
- Bob Wilson - guitar, keyboards, backing vocals

Technical

- Jon Astley - engineer
