= Any Road Up =

Studio album by the Steve Gibbons Band
- Released: 1976
- Recorded: 1975
- Studios: Eel Pie, Ramport and Advision Studios, London
- Genres: Rock, blues, rock and roll, folk, jazz, country, R&B
- Length: 45:04
- Labels: MCA in US, Polydor in UK and Germany
- Producer: Peter Meaden

The Steve Gibbons Band chronology
Any Road Up (1976)	Rollin' On (1977)

Professional ratings
Review scores
Source	Rating
AllMusic	3/5 stars

Any Road Up is the debut studio album by the Steve Gibbons Band. The band were under the Who's management stable and this album was released by Polydor Records in 1976. This was followed by a tour with the Who in the UK, Europe and the United States. Playing arenas, they shared the stage with Little Feat, Lynyrd Skynyrd, Electric Light Orchestra, the J. Geils Band and Nils Lofgren.

The album failed to chart while the song "Johnny Cool" (based on the film of the same name) reached the US Billboard Hot 100, stalling at No. 72.

== Track listing ==
All tracks composed by Steve Gibbons

No.	Title	Length
1.	"Take Me Home"	4:04
2.	"Johnny Cool"	3:55
3.	"Rollin'"	5:53
4.	"Spark of Love"	4:14
5.	"Standing on the Bridge"	3:13
6.	"Natural Thing"	4:21
7.	"Speed Kills"	3:33
8.	"Strange World"	5:17
9.	"Sweetheart"	4:20

== 1993 Reissue Tracks ==
No.	Title	Length
1.	"Get up and Dance"	3:15
2.	"Little Suzie"	2:59

== 1997 Reissue Tracks ==
No.	Title	Length
1.	"Back Street Cat"
2.	"Dick Malone"

== Personnel ==
The Steve Gibbons Band

- Steve Gibbons - guitar, lead vocals
- Trevor Burton - bass guitar, lead guitar, vocals
- Dave Carroll - lead guitar, vocals
- Bob Lamb - drums
- Bob Wilson - lead guitar, keyboards, vocals

with:

- John Entwistle - bass guitar, backing vocals

Technical

- Anton Matthews - associate producer, Advison Studios
- Ken Laguna - remixing, Advision Studios; additional instrumentation
- John Entwistle - mixing, Ramport Studios
- Terry O'Neill - photography
