= Get Wet (band) =

American pop group

Get Wet was a 1980s pop group, featuring lead singer Sherri Beachfront (born Sherri Krichman, April 12, 1954), who married blues guitarist George Lewis in 1987. They had one hit in America in 1981 with the Boardwalk/Columbia single "Just So Lonely", which peaked at #39 on the Billboard Hot 100. In Australia, it peaked at #15 on the Australian Singles Chart (Kent Music Report). The group appeared on popular shows of the day, including The Merv Griffin Show, Solid Gold, American Bandstand and Musikladen in the summer of 1981.
