= Bad Reputation (Joan Jett song) =

1980 single by Joan Jett

- West German picture sleeve

Single by Joan Jett

from the album Bad Reputation
- B-side: "You Don't Know What You've Got"
- Released: 1980
- Genre: Punk rock; hard rock
- Length: 2:48
- Label: Blackheart
- Songwriters: Joan Jett; Ritchie Cordell; Kenny Laguna; Marty Kupersmith

Joan Jett singles chronology
"You Don't Own Me" (1980)	"Bad Reputation" (1980)	"I Love Rock 'n Roll" (1982)

Music video
- "Bad Reputation" on YouTube

"Bad Reputation" is a rock song co-written and recorded by American singer Joan Jett from her debut studio album of the same name. It remains one of her signature songs.

== Accolades ==
In 2009, it was named the 29th best hard rock song of all time by VH1. It is the highest-ranked song by a woman on the list. In 2021, it was listed at No. 249 on Rolling Stone's "500 Greatest Songs of All Time".

== Music video ==
A music video was made in 1982 after the huge success of "I Love Rock 'n Roll". The video, directed by David Mallet, is a re-enactment of 23 record labels rejecting Jett's debut solo studio album and her subsequent rise to the top of the charts with "I Love Rock 'n Roll". Kenny Laguna, cofounder of Blackheart Records, makes a cameo appearance as the Warner Bros. executive.

At the start of the "I Love Rock 'n Roll" music video, "Bad Reputation" is loudly playing on the jukebox.

== Personnel ==
Personnel taken from Bad Reputation album liner notes.

Joan Jett & the Roll-Ups

- Joan Jett – lead vocals, lead and rhythm guitar
- Lea Hart – rhythm guitar
- Kenny Laguna – piano, tambourine, backing vocals
- Paul Simmons – drums
- Jeff Peters – bass guitar

Additional musicians

- Ritchie Cordell – backing vocals
- Martyn Watson – backing vocals

== Certifications ==
Region	Certification	Certified units/sales
New Zealand (RMNZ)	Gold	15,000^{‡}
United States (RIAA)	Gold	500,000^{‡}
^{‡} Sales+streaming figures based on certification alone.

== In popular culture ==
The song has been used as Ronda Rousey's entrance music in her Ultimate Fighting Championship (UFC) and WWE careers. Jett performed the song live at WrestleMania 35, as Rousey entered the ring to defend her WWE Raw Women's Championship in the first ever women's Main Event at WrestleMania.

The song has been used in advertisements for Folgers, Jack Daniel's, and Nike.

The song is featured in the opening scene of teen romantic comedy film 10 Things I Hate About You (1999).

The song is the theme for the teen comedy drama television series Freaks and Geeks (1999–2000). It was also featured in the animated fantasy comedy film Shrek (2001), and a cover version of the song by hard rock band Halfcocked is featured on its soundtrack.

The song was used as an entrance song for Taylor Swift's 2018 Reputation Stadium Tour.

The song was used as the opening theme for the romantic comedy film Red, White & Royal Blue (2023).

A cover version of the song, performed by actress and singer Kylie Cantrall, was recorded for the soundtrack of the musical teen fantasy comedy film Descendants: The Rise of Red (2024). It was featured in one of the teasers for the film.

== Avril Lavigne version ==
"Bad Reputation"

Promotional single by Avril Lavigne

from the album One Piece Film: Z
- Released: December 12, 2012
- Recorded: 2008
- Studio: Mr. Biz (Los Angeles)
- Genre: Punk rock
- Length: 2:42
- Label: Sony Music Entertainment Japan
- Songwriters: Joan Jett; Ritchie Cordell; Kenny Laguna; Marty Joe Kupersmith
- Producer: Deryck Whibley

Official audio
- "Bad Reputation" on YouTube

=== Background, release and composition ===
"Bad Reputation" is a promotional single by Canadian singer Avril Lavigne from the soundtrack for One Piece Film: Z, released on December 11, 2012. The song was originally featured in a video montage interval during Lavigne's The Best Damn Tour in 2008, before appearing as bonus tracks on her fourth and fifth studio albums, Goodbye Lullaby (2011) and Avril Lavigne (2013). On 17 October 2012, it was announced that Lavigne would be contributing two songs to the One Piece Film: Z soundtrack, being "Bad Reputation" and a cover version of the Nickelback's 2001 song "How You Remind Me". An exclusive promotional CD single was released in Japan on December 12, 2012.

=== Commercial reception ===
"Bad Reputation" charted moderately upon release, ultimately peaking at No. 8 on the Billboard Japan Hot 100.

=== Track listings ===
- Japan 2 tracks CD single
1. "Bad Reputation" — 2:42

=== Charts ===
Chart (2012)	Peak position
Japan Hot 100 (Billboard)	8

=== Certifications ===
Region	Certification	Certified units/sales
Japan (RIAJ) Digital single	Gold	100,000^{*}
^{*} Sales figures based on certification alone.

=== Release history ===
Country	Date	Format	Label	Ref.
Japan	December 12, 2012	CD	Sony Japan	
