= I Love Rock 'n' Roll =

1975 song by the Arrows and covered by Joan Jett

- 2004 re-issue

Single by Arrows
- B-side: "Broken Down Heart"
- Released: July 1975
- Recorded: 1975
- Genre: Hard rock
- Length: 2:48
- Label: RAK
- Songwriters: Alan Merrill; Jake Hooker
- Producer: Mickie Most

Arrows singles chronology
"Hard Hearted" (1975)	"I Love Rock 'n' Roll" (1975)	"Once Upon a Time" (1976)

Audio
- "I Love Rock 'n' Roll" on YouTube

"I Love Rock 'n' Roll" is a 1975 rock song written by Alan Merrill and Jake Hooker for their English glam rock band, the Arrows. The song received international attention when it was covered by Joan Jett for her 1981 album I Love Rock 'n Roll. Jett's version is the best known rendition of the song.

Conceived by Merrill in response to "It's Only Rock 'n Roll (But I Like It)" by the Rolling Stones, Jett first saw the Arrows perform the song on their self-titled UK series in 1976. She brought it to her band of the time, the Runaways, who ultimately passed on the song. After the Runaways split, Jett and the Blackhearts covered the song. Released in 1982 as a single, it topped the U.S. Billboard Hot 100 for seven weeks and several international charts, and was certified platinum by the Recording Industry Association of America (RIAA) for selling over two million copies within the United States.

Jett's version is often featured in professional listings of the greatest songs of all time. It is an enduring work, being covered by artists such as Britney Spears and parodied by "Weird Al" Yankovic. In 2016, it was inducted into the Grammy Hall of Fame.

== Background ==
Merrill of the Arrows wrote both the music and lyrics, whilst living in London at Nell Gwynn House in Chelsea. He gave a co-writer credit to Hooker as part of settling a debt. In an interview with Songfacts, Merrill said he wrote the song as "a knee-jerk response to the Rolling Stones' 'It's Only Rock 'n Roll (But I Like It)'." It is a hard rock song. It was recorded in 1975.

== Release ==
The song was originally released by the Arrows in 1975 on Rak Records, with Merrill on lead vocals and guitar and Mickie Most producing. This version was first released as a B-side, but was soon re-recorded and flipped to A-side status on a subsequent pressing of the record. Arrows performed the song in 1975 on the Muriel Young-produced show 45, after which Young offered Arrows a weekly UK television series, Arrows, which was broadcast on ITV starting in March 1976.

== Joan Jett version ==
"I Love Rock 'n Roll"
- US and Australian picture sleeve

Single by Joan Jett and the Blackhearts

from the album I Love Rock 'n Roll
- B-side: "Love Is Pain"
- Released: January 20, 1982
- Recorded: 1981
- Studio: Kingdom Sound (Long Island)
- Genre: Hard rock
- Length: 2:55 (LP version); 2:45 (single release)
- Label: Boardwalk
- Songwriters: Alan Merrill; Jake Hooker
- Producers: Kenny Laguna; Ritchie Cordell

Joan Jett and the Blackhearts singles chronology
"Bad Reputation" (1981)	"I Love Rock 'n Roll" (1982)	"Crimson and Clover" (1982)

Music video
- "I Love Rock 'n Roll" on YouTube

=== Background ===
Joan Jett saw the Arrows perform "I Love Rock 'n' Roll" on their weekly UK television series Arrows while she was touring England with the Runaways in 1976. The Runaways' producer and manager Kim Fowley had the band learn the song in the summer of 1977, during the brief period when Vicki Blue had replaced Jackie Fox as bass player and Cherie Currie was still the group's vocalist. However, the band ultimately passed on the song since they had previously covered The Velvet Underground's "Rock & Roll". After the Runaways disbanded, Jett recorded the first version of the song in 1979, with Steve Jones and Paul Cook of Sex Pistols. It was released on vinyl in 1979 on Vertigo Records as a B-side to "You Don't Own Me" to limited success.

In 1981, Jett re-recorded the song with her newly-founded band, the Blackhearts, to be featured on the album of the same name. Jett recalled the recording being vigorously paced, since, "During the weekdays we'd be in the studio and during the weekends we'd travel around the New York area, the Northeast, doing gigs, [...] we were doing both without really stopping. Which was good I thought, it really kept us together, it kept us sharp." It was produced by Kenny Laguna, Jett's long-time friend and collaborator, and Ritchie Cordell. Like the Arrows' original version, it is a hard rock song.

Of the song's impact compared to the Arrows' original recording, Dave Ling of Louder quipped that "you'd be forgiven for not knowing it was a cover version." Arrow band member Alan Merrill himself told Jett in 2013 that "she was an honorary Arrow because she looked like one of us. I always fancied her, and we developed a loose friendship. Since then she has played a large part in my life and I in hers, whether she admits it or not."

=== Release and promotion ===
"I Love Rock 'n Roll" was released as a single on January 20, 1982, distributed by Boardwalk Records in the United States and Canada.

The music video for "I Love Rock 'n Roll" produced by Barry Ralbag, received heavy play by the fledgling MTV network. It featured Jett and the Blackhearts traveling to a small, dingy bar and then exciting the drunken crowd by performing the song and yelling out its chorus. The filming location was at the corner of Lexington Avenue and East 85th Street on the Upper East Side in Manhattan, New York City. At the time, the bar was called Privates, now a Starbucks. A snippet of Jett's 1981 hit "Bad Reputation" can be heard at the beginning of the video. The video was originally in colour, but it was converted to black and white because Jett hated the look of her red leather jumpsuit.

In 1993 Joan Jett & the Blackhearts made another music video for the song as part of the Wayne's World 2 soundtrack. The video consisted of scenes from the movie, with Mike Myers and Dana Carvey, mixed with footage of Jett and her band in a faux concert filmed at Irving Plaza in New York City. The song was again released as a single by Warner/Reprise with "Activity Grrrl" as the B-side.

=== Reception and legacy ===
"I Love Rock 'n Roll" was a critical and commercial success. At the Juno Awards of 1983, the song was nominated for International Single of the Year, losing to "Eye of the Tiger" by Survivor. The song became a Billboard Hot 100 number-one single for seven weeks, being the only one for the band. On September 20, 1982, the song was platinum-certified by the Recording Industry Association of America (RIAA) for selling over two million copies in the United States. It ultimately emerged as both the third most successful song of 1982 and one of the decade's most successful songs. In 2024, 42 years after its release, it debuted on the Billboard Hard Rock Streaming Songs charts at number 23.

AllMusic's Steve Huey called the song a "cornerstone single in the brave new world opened up for female rock musicians" and said her cover "gives the tune a slightly punky flavor—sort of the Ramones meets "Louie Louie"—but the song's deliberate tempo and Jett's love of the big chorus hook set it squarely in the realm of hard rock." Michael Cohen of Creem complimented Jett's "contagious enthusiasm". Hugh McIntyre of Forbes deemed it "one of the world’s favorite rock songs. It’s insanely catchy with just enough of an edge, so how could the public not love it?" Writers of Record World said it "has anthem qualities and heroic lead guitar riffs that should take it all the way to the top." Tom Breihan of Stereogum wrote, "Joan Jett uses the song to put the full force of her tough-kid charisma on display. She makes a simple statement of musical preference sound like a rallying cry, a statement of religious truth, a come-on. She makes rock ‘n’ roll sound like something worth loving."

In 2005, Q placed "I Love Rock 'n Roll" at number 85 on their list of the "100 Greatest Guitar Tracks Ever!" In 2008, the song was placed at number 56 in Billboard's "Greatest Songs of All Time" list. Rolling Stone has placed the song on the 2004 and 2010 iterations of their "500 Greatest Songs of All Time" list, at 484 and 491 respectively; the same publication also ranked it number 97 on their 2023 list of "The 200 Best Songs of The 1980s". Jett's version was inducted into the Grammy Hall of Fame in 2016.

=== Track listing ===
1982 release
No.	Title	Length
1.	"I Love Rock 'n Roll"	2:55
2.	"Love Is Pain"	3:07

=== Personnel ===
Credits adapted from the I Love Rock 'n Roll liner notes.

- Joan Jett – lead vocals, rhythm guitar

The Blackhearts

- Ricky Byrd – lead guitar, backing vocals
- Gary Ryan – bass, backing vocals
- Lee Crystal – drums

Additional personnel

- Kenny Laguna – production
- Ritchie Cordell – production

=== Charts ===
==== Weekly charts ====
Chart (1982)	Peak position
Australia (Kent Music Report)	1
Austria (Ö3 Austria Top 40)	4
Belgium (Ultratop 50 Flanders)	2
Canada Top Singles (RPM)	1
Finland (Suomen virallinen lista)	8
France (SNEP)	4
Ireland (IRMA)	2
Netherlands (Dutch Top 40)	1
Netherlands (Single Top 100)	1
New Zealand (Recorded Music NZ)	1
South Africa (Springbok Radio)	1
Sweden (Sverigetopplistan)	1
Switzerland (Schweizer Hitparade)	3
UK Singles (Official Charts)	4
US Billboard Hot 100	1
US Dance Club Songs (Billboard)	31
US Mainstream Rock Airplay (Billboard)	1
US Cash Box Top 100	1
West Germany (GfK)	6

Chart (1992–1994)	Peak position
Europe (Eurochart Hot 100)	21
France (SNEP)	3
New Zealand (Recorded Music NZ)	45
Sweden (Sverigetopplistan)	13

Chart (2021)	Peak position
Poland Airplay (ZPAV)	54

==== Year-end charts ====
Chart (1982)	Position
Australia (Kent Music Report)	7
Belgium (Ultratop)	26
Canada Top Singles (RPM)	1
Netherlands (Dutch Top 40)	25
Netherlands (Single Top 100)	22
New Zealand (RIANZ)	7
South Africa (Springbok Radio)	7
US Billboard Hot 100	3
US Cash Box Top 100	5
West Germany (Media Control)	34

Chart (1994)	Position
Sweden (Topplistan)	58

=== All-time charts ===
Chart (1958–2018)	Position
US Billboard Hot 100	72

=== Certifications ===
Region	Certification	Certified units/sales
Australia (ARIA)	Platinum	100,000^{^}
Canada (Music Canada) Digital Download	Gold	40,000^{*}
Canada (Music Canada) Physical	2× Platinum	200,000^{^}
Denmark (IFPI Danmark)	Gold	45,000^{‡}
France (SNEP)	Silver	250,000^{*}
Germany (BVMI)	Gold	300,000^{‡}
Italy (FIMI)	Gold	50,000^{‡}
Spain (Promusicae)	Gold	30,000^{‡}
United Kingdom (BPI)	Platinum	600,000^{‡}
United States (RIAA) Physical	Platinum	2,000,000^{^}
United States Digital	—	1,808,784
^{*} Sales figures based on certification alone.^{^} Shipments figures based on certification alone.^{‡} Sales+streaming figures based on certification alone.

== Britney Spears version ==
"I Love Rock 'n' Roll"

Single by Britney Spears

from the album Britney
- Released: 27 May 2002
- Studio: The Record Plant (Los Angeles); Hit Factory Criteria (Miami)
- Length: 3:06
- Label: Jive
- Songwriters: Jake Hooker; Alan Merrill
- Producer: Rodney Jerkins

Britney Spears singles chronology
"I'm Not a Girl, Not Yet a Woman" (2002)	"I Love Rock 'n' Roll" (2002)	"Boys" (2002)

Music video
- "I Love Rock 'n' Roll" on YouTube

=== Background and release ===
"I Love Rock 'n' Roll" is the fourth European single from American singer Britney Spears' third studio album, Britney (2001), released on 27 May 2002. The song was used in her 2002 film Crossroads, in which her character Lucy performs it in a karaoke bar. Spears said of the song, "They asked me to sing karaoke in the movie Crossroads and I've actually sung 'I Love Rock 'n' Roll' in a lot of clubs that I've been to." Spears has publicly stated that the original song is one of her favorites. She listened to the original Arrows Mickie Most-produced version just before she recorded the song, according to Jive A&R representative Steve Lunt. The scratches performed on this version were performed by Corey Chase at The Hit Factory Criteria studios in Miami. When promoting the single's release, Spears mistakenly attributed the successful version of the song to Pat Benatar instead of Joan Jett.

=== Promotion ===
The music video, directed by Chris Applebaum, shows Spears with her own band, a stack of speakers and flashing lights. The video begins in black and white and switches to and from colour throughout. It was shot at The Inn, a bar in Long Beach, New York. The video was ranked at number two on the 100 Best Videos of 2002 list during MTV Latin America's countdown. A director's cut version of the video was later leaked, containing previously unseen scenes.

The song was performed live during Spears' Dream Within a Dream Tour (2001–02). In 2016, it was added to the revamped set list of her Las Vegas residency show, Britney: Piece of Me (2016–17), marking the first time Spears performed the song in 14 years. During the performance, Spears rode a mechanical electric guitar, which simulated a mechanical bull, as it rotated on stage. The same prop electric guitar had been used during her Femme Fatale Tour (2011) for a segment in which she covered the song "Burning Up" by Madonna. At the 2016 Billboard Music Awards, the song was performed as part of a medley.

=== Reception ===
"I Love Rock 'n' Roll" charted moderately upon release, reaching the top 20 in most regions. The song was moderately successful in the UK, where it peaked at number 13 (which, at the time, was Spears' lowest peak for a single released there, until "If U Seek Amy" only managed to reach number 20 in 2009). It was certified gold in Australia.

Spears' cover was met with mostly favorable reviews. NME's Ted Kessler wrote that she "still works best when making a good pop cheese and dance sandwich: there's the ace Rodney Jerkins-produced version of Joan Jett's 'I Love Rock 'n' Roll', which does exactly what it says on the tin." Rolling Stone's Barry Walters wrote that "producer Rodney Jerkins' hip-hop blaspheming of Joan Jett's "I Love Rock 'n' Roll" doesn't go as far as it should (is a Limp Bizkit remix in its future?), but it certainly beats what her earlier studio architects did to those Sonny and Cher ("The Beat Goes On" on ...Baby One More Time) and Stones ("(I Can't Get No) Satisfaction" on Oops!... I Did It Again) songs." Another positive reception came from PopMatters' editor Nikki Tranter, who enjoyed that the song is "different from the average run-of-the-mill pop offering," and praised that "she does strange justice to the tune, vamping up her vocals and turning out something, that while silly and camp, is actually a fun listen." In contrast, David Browne wrote for Entertainment Weekly that "her remake is neither imaginative (it simply xeroxes Joan Jett's arrangement) nor all that believable."

=== Track listings ===
- European 2-track CD single
1. "I Love Rock 'n' Roll" (Album Version) – 3:06
2. "Overprotected" (Darkchild Remix) – 3:18
- European/Australian CD single
1. "I Love Rock 'n' Roll" (Album Version) – 3:08
2. "I Love Rock 'n' Roll" (Karaoke Version) – 3:06
3. "Overprotected" (Darkchild Remix) – 3:20
4. "I'm Not a Girl, Not Yet a Woman" (Metro Remix) – 5:26
- German 2 tracks CD single
1. "I Love Rock 'n' Roll" (Album Version) – 3:07
2. "I Love Rock 'n' Roll" (Karaoke Version) – 3:05
- German CD single
1. "I Love Rock 'n' Roll" (Album Version) – 3:07
2. "I Love Rock 'n' Roll" (Karaoke Version) – 3:05
3. "Overprotected" (Riprock 'N Alex G Remix) – 3:25
4. "I'm Not a Girl, Not Yet a Woman" (Metro Remix) – 5:24
- Japanese CD maxi single
1. "I Love Rock 'n' Roll" (Album Version) – 3:06
2. "I Love Rock 'n' Roll" (Karaoke Version) – 3:04
3. "Overprotected" (Darkchild Remix) – 3:20
4. "I'm Not a Girl, Not Yet a Woman" (Metro Remix) – 5:25
5. "I'm a Slave 4 U" (Thunderpuss Radio Mix) – 3:18
6. "I'm a Slave 4 U" (Miguel Migs Petalpusher Vocal) – 5:30
7. "I'm Not a Girl, Not Yet a Woman" (Spanish Fly Dub Mix) – 5:55
- UK CD maxi single
1. "I Love Rock 'n' Roll" (Album Version) – 3:06
2. "I Love Rock 'n' Roll" (Karaoke Version) – 3:04
3. "Overprotected (Darkchild Remix Radio Edit)" – 3:06
4. "I Love Rock 'n' Roll" (Video) – 3:06
- Cassette single
1. "I Love Rock 'n' Roll" (Album Version) – 3:06
2. "I Love Rock 'n' Roll" (Karaoke Version) – 3:04
3. "Overprotected" (Darkchild Remix Edit) – 3:06
- Digital download (Digital 45)
1. "I Love Rock 'n' Roll" – 3:07
2. "I'm Not a Girl, Not Yet a Woman" (Metro Remix Radio Edit) – 3:29

=== Charts ===
==== Weekly charts ====
Chart (2002)	Peak position
Australia (ARIA)	13
Austria (Ö3 Austria Top 40)	9
Belgium (Ultratop 50 Flanders)	15
Belgium (Ultratop 50 Wallonia)	27
Canada (Nielsen SoundScan)	32
Croatia (HRT)	8
Eurochart Hot 100 (Music & Media)	24
Finland (Suomen virallinen lista)	19
Germany (GfK)	7
Hungary (Single Top 40)	6
Ireland (IRMA)	8
Italy (FIMI)	20
Japan (Oricon)	26
Netherlands (Dutch Top 40)	17
Netherlands (Single Top 100)	18
Portugal (AFP)	4
Romania (Romanian Top 100)	42
Scottish Singles Sales (Official Charts)	7
Slovenia (RTV)	10
Sweden (Sverigetopplistan)	15
Switzerland (Schweizer Hitparade)	15
UK Singles (Official Charts)	13
UK Independent (Official Charts)	2

==== Year-end charts ====
Chart (2002)	Position
Australia (ARIA)	70
Belgium (Ultratop 50 Flanders)	76
Germany (Media Control)	96
Sweden (Hitlistan)	85
Switzerland (Schweizer Hitparade)	81

=== Certifications ===
Region	Certification	Certified units/sales
Australia (ARIA)	Gold	35,000^{^}
^{^} Shipments figures based on certification alone.

=== Release history ===
Release dates and formats for "I Love Rock 'n' Roll"
Region	Date	Format(s)	Label(s)	Ref.
Germany	27 May 2002	Maxi CD	Rough Trade	
Australia	3 June 2002	Maxi CD	Zomba	
Japan	19 June 2002	Maxi CD	Zomba	
United Kingdom	4 November 2002	Cassette; maxi CD	Jive	

== Alex Gaudino and Jason Rooney version ==
"I Love Rock 'n' Roll"

Promotional single by Alex Gaudino & Jason Rooney
- Released: 3 December 2008
- Recorded: 2008
- Length: 3:37
- Label: 541; NEWS
- Songwriters: Alan Merrill; Jake Hooker

Alex Gaudino chronology
"Watch Out" (2008)	"I Love Rock 'n' Roll" (2008)	"I'm in Love (I Wanna Do It)" (2010)

Music video
- "I Love Rock 'n' Roll" on YouTube

A cover version by Alex Gaudino and Jason Rooney was released in 2008.

=== Track listing ===
UK Digital download
No.	Title	Length
1.	"I Love Rock 'n' Roll" (Radio Edit)	3:37
2.	"I Love Rock 'n' Roll" (Extended Mix)	7:43
3.	"I Love Rock 'n' Roll" (Dabruck, Klein Remix)	6:01
4.	"I Love Rock 'n' Roll" (Nari & Milani Remix)	5:35
5.	"I Love Rock 'n' Roll" (Disko Kriminals Remix)	7:05

Credits and personnel

- Lead vocals – Alex Gaudino
- Music – Alan Merrill, Jake Hooker
- Lyrics – Alan Merrill, Jake Hooker
- Scratches – Corey Chase
- Label: 541/NEWS

=== Chart performance ===
Chart (2008)	Peak position
Belgium (Ultratip Bubbling Under Wallonia)	10

=== Release history ===
Region	Date	Format
United Kingdom	3 December 2008	Digital download

== LadBaby version ==
"I Love Sausage Rolls"

Single by LadBaby
- Released: 13 December 2019
- Recorded: 2019
- Length: 3:23
- Label: Frtyfve
- Songwriters: Alan Merrill; Jake Hooker

LadBaby singles chronology
"We Built This City" (2018)	"I Love Sausage Rolls" (2019)	"Don't Stop Me Eatin'" (2020)

Music video
- "I Love Sausage Rolls" on YouTube

In December 2019, English blogger LadBaby released a comedy version of the song with a sausage roll theme as a charity single whose profits went to The Trussell Trust. The single's cover is based on Abbey Road's cover. The song peaked at number one on the UK Singles Chart and in Scotland.

=== Background ===
In December 2019, LadBaby announced his bid for the official Christmas number one. As with their last release "We Built This City", all proceeds from the single went to The Trussell Trust. He said, "We were blown away by the support we received on our Christmas Number 1 single last year and how far that money has gone into changing the lives of families living in poverty across the UK. We're continually looking for ways we can support food bank charity the Trussell Trust further as the size of the problem still facing so many adults (and children) is huge and we ALL need to do whatever we can to say goodbye to poverty once and for all in the UK! If we can use our social media presence for good by singing about sausage rolls, giving people something to smile about and helping families eat this year, then why wouldn't we. Officially, the most unanticipated single of the decade...AGAIN!"

=== Charts ===
On 20 December 2019, the song entered the UK Singles Chart at number one, claiming the Christmas number one with 93,000 chart sales and with 85,000 of that total coming via downloads. It was also the fastest-selling download since Artists for Grenfell version of "Bridge over Troubled Water" in June 2017. LadBaby became the third act to have two consecutive Christmas number one singles and the first to have two successive novelty Christmas number ones in the UK. After reaching number one, LadBaby said, "How have we done this again? It's the best feeling in the world – it's a Christmas miracle yet again! Thank you everybody for supporting us once again, and all for an amazing cause. It's going to the Trussell Trust – to the 14 million people living in poverty in the UK. Who doesn't love a sausage roll at Christmas?" The song dropped from number one to number 57, and was overtaken by English singer Ellie Goulding's cover of the Joni Mitchell song, "River" (1971).

Chart (2019)	Peak position
Australia (ARIA)	100
Ireland (IRMA)	59
New Zealand Hot Singles (RMNZ)	20
Scottish Singles Sales (Official Charts)	1
UK Singles (Official Charts)	1
UK Independent (Official Charts)	1
US Hot Rock Songs (Billboard)	10

== Other versions ==
- "Weird Al" Yankovic parodied the song in 1983 as "I Love Rocky Road".
- Joan Kirner, Premier of Victoria at the time, performed the song on The Late Show in 1992. Former Health Minister David White played the guitar solo.
- Apologetix parodied the song in 2000 as "I Love Apostle Paul".
- Forever Young reached #27 in France in 2003 with their cover version.
- Mariska Hargitay performed the song as "I Love TV Screens" for the opening number of the 78th Primetime Emmy Awards.

== See also ==
- List of Billboard Hot 100 number ones of 1982
- Riot grrrl movement
