= Ricky Byrd =

American musician (born 1956)

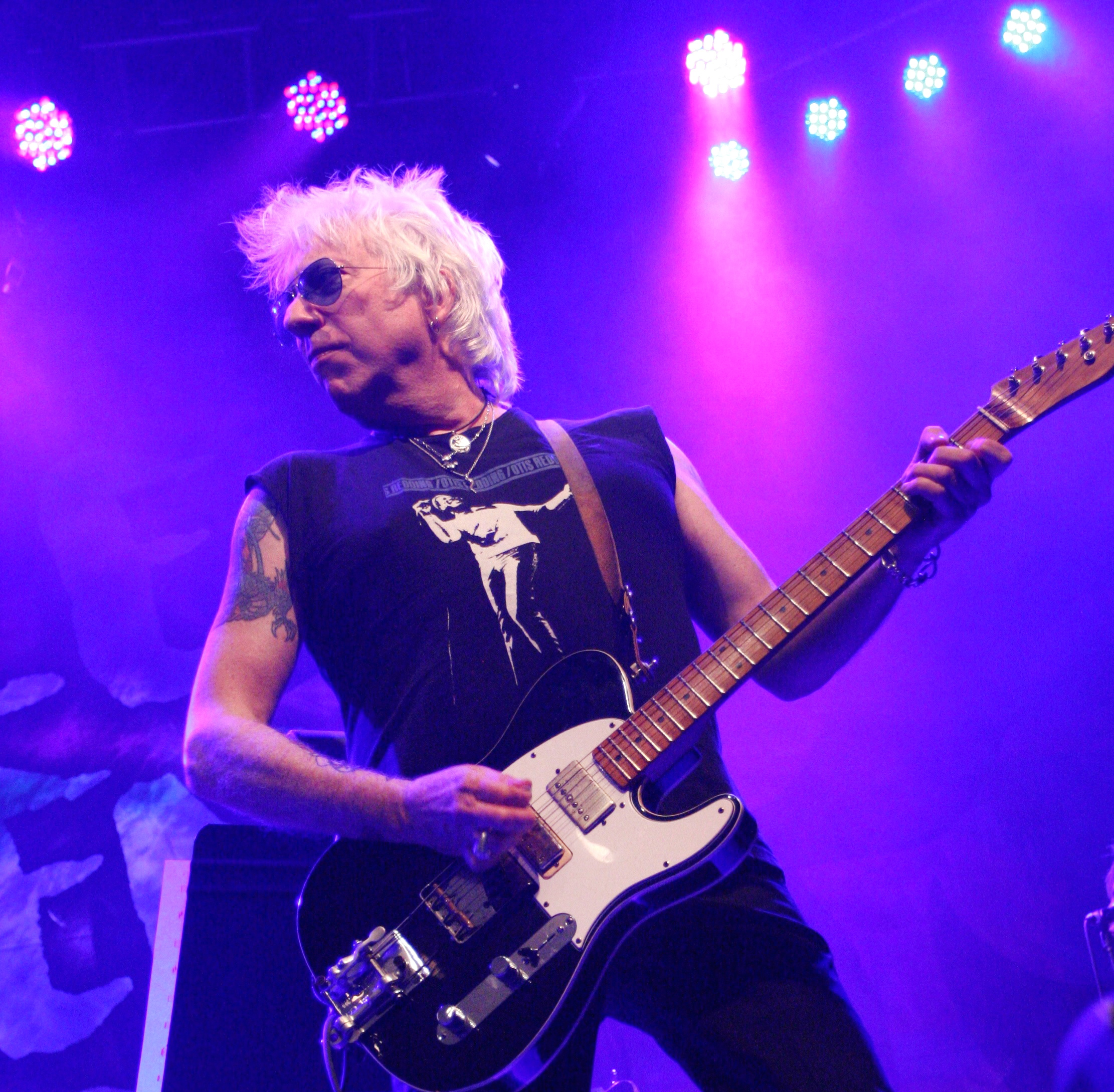
- Byrd performing live in 2017

Background information
- Born: Richard Scott Bird; October 20, 1956 (age 69); Bronx, New York City, New York, U.S.
- Genres: Rock; blues; soul
- Occupations: Guitarist; singer; songwriter; producer; public speaker
- Instruments: Vocals; guitar
- Years active: 1970–present
- Labels: RCA; Kayos; Wicked Cool Recovery Troubadour; Boardwalk; MCA
- Website: rickybyrd.com

Ricky Byrd (born Richard Scott Bird; October 20, 1956) is a rock and roll guitar player, singer, songwriter and producer. He spent over a decade as a member of Joan Jett and the Blackhearts, where he contributed music and background vocals to two platinum albums, I Love Rock 'n Roll (1981) and Up Your Alley (1988), the gold certified Album (1983) and four others for the band.

Byrd has performed, recorded or toured with The Who's Roger Daltrey, Ian Hunter, Southside Johnny, Paul McCartney, Ringo Starr, Joe Walsh, Alice Cooper, Mavis Staples, Billy Squier, Darlene Love, Smokey Robinson, The Beach Boys, Brian Wilson, Jimmy Page, Steve Miller, Steven Van Zandt, John Waite, Ronnie Spector, Graham Nash, Don Felder, Bruce Springsteen, Dion, Elvis Costello, Paul Shaffer, Bonnie Bramlett, Bobby Whitlock, Sam Moore, Billie Joe Armstrong, Gary Clark Jr., Peter Wolf, Stevie Wonder, among others. He has co-written or had his songs covered by numerous artists including Roger Daltrey, Joan Jett, Genya Ravan, Chris Farlowe, B.J.Scott, Sanne Salomonsen, and more.

Byrd has released 5 solo albums (Tough Room...This World, Lifer, Clean Getaway, Sobering Times and NYC Made), Clean Getaway and Sobering Times containing lyrics that focus on addiction, recovery, and hope, drawing on his own past struggles with drugs and alcohol. In recovery for over thirty years, Byrd performs at benefit shows to raise awareness and money for drug and alcohol treatment facilities, and is a certified recovery coach and drug and alcohol counselor. He coined the phrase, "Recovery Troubadour", as he leads recovery music groups at treatment facilities around the United States.

== Early life ==
Byrd grew up in the Bronx borough of New York City, but his family moved to Flushing, Queens when he was around age seven and he grew up in the shadow of Flushing High School, where Ricky eventually attended and graduated from. As a teenager, he listened to British rock, Memphis soul, and Blues. He began playing guitar after seeing the Rolling Stones and The Beatles on The Ed Sullivan Show.

Early performances were in cover bands at local dances, schools, and parties, and at 16, while still using his name Ricky Bird, he joined a band called Ruff Stuff. The group performed at Max's Kansas City and Mercer Arts Center in New York City, and other locations before he started going by a new professional name—Ricky Byrd.

== Musical career ==
At 21 in 1977, Byrd joined the Power pop band called Susan,. The group released one album, Falling in Love Again! in 1979 on RCA Records, and toured opening for Graham Parker and others.

In 1981, rocker Joan Jett was looking for a guitarist to replace Eric Ambel in her band the Blackhearts. After jamming with her band, Byrd joined the Blackhearts and played guitar and sang background vocals on the album in progress, I Love Rock n' Roll. The album sold one million copies in the U.S., went to number 2 on the Billboard 200 Albums chart, and sold over ten million copies worldwide. The single, "I Love Rock n' Roll" remained as Billboard Hot 100 number one for seven weeks.

Joan Jett and the Blackhearts toured the world starting in clubs and then ultimately played stadiums. Byrd was a Blackheart with Joan Jett from 1981 to 1991, recording guitar, vocals and co-writing various songs for the followup platinum-selling Album in 1983, Glorious Results of a Misspent Youth in 1984, Good Music in 1986, the platinum-certified Up Your Alley in 1988, The Hit List and Notorious in 1991.

During this time, Byrd struggled with drug and alcohol addiction, got clean and sober in 1987, and remained with Joan Jett and the Blackhearts for another four years playing and touring.

When he left the Blackhearts, Byrd signed a deal with Sony Music Publishing. During this time, he recorded and toured with Roger Daltrey and toured with Ian Hunter.

In 1999, Byrd released his debut solo album, Tough Room...This World, a "blues-inflected acoustic-rock set" recorded live from a show in New York. Joining him onstage and on record were Todd Rundgren bassist Kasim Sulton and Bad Company drummer Simon Kirke. Byrd released the record on his own label, Kayos Records.

Now sober from drugs and alcohol, Byrd began performing at recovery-related fundraisers at treatment centers after the Del Fuegos' Woody Geissmann invited him to play at Right Turn, a Boston treatment facility he founded. "I continued to be a part of these benefits for the next few years, and in 2012 I co-wrote my first recovery song called 'Broken is a Place' with my pal Richie Supa," Byrd told Parade magazine. Byrd performed "Broken is a Place" live at these recovery-type of shows.

Byrd's second album, Lifer was recorded in Nashville and New York City, executive produced by Ray Kennedy (five-time Grammy winner who worked with Steve Earle, Ray Davies, Sheryl Crow) and co-produced by Byrd and Bob Stander. The album, released in 2012, was the number 10 Coolest Album in the World 2013 and “Things to Learn” from the album was Coolest Song in the World the first week of January 2014 on Little Steven’s Underground Garage radio show.

“From the time I left Joan Jett and the Blackhearts around 1991, I was really trying to see what I sounded like on my own,” Byrd told Guitar Player. “I knew who my influences were—I grew up on everything from the Raspberries to the Who to the Stones to the Yardbirds to Otis Redding. If you just mix that all in a stew, I guess it comes out Ricky Byrd."

In April 2015, Joan Jett and the Blackhearts were inducted into the 30th Annual Rock and Roll Hall of Fame at a ceremony in Cleveland, Ohio. As a Blackheart, Byrd received the honor as well as the other band members.

When Byrd was 30 years clean and sober, in October 2015, he released his third solo album, Clean Getaway, 12 songs focusing on the struggles of drug addiction and the positive side of recovery that he wrote or co-wrote with Richie Supa and Mark Hudson. The album of original songs also includes a cover of Paul Revere and the Raiders' 1966 hit "Kicks." Byrd told ABC News Radio that Clean Getaway is "kind of like a self-help book with a backbeat."

Clean Getaway was produced by Byrd and Bob Stander, and featured players including keyboardist Bobby Whitlock (Derek and The Dominos); drummer Steve Holley (Wings); bassist Stander; keyboardist Andy Burton (Little Steven and the Disciples of Soul); keyboardist Jeff Kazee (Southside Johnny); horn players John Isley and Chris Anderson of the Asbury Jukes (horns); vocalists Christine Ohlman (Saturday Night Live band), Marge Raymond, Mark Hudson, and Sara Devine.

"My job is to show people you can be sober and still have fun. I tell them, 'Look, I did it, brother,'" Byrd said.

In February 2023, Byrd released "Glamdemic Blues" as a digital and 7-inch single. The B-side is a remake of the Four Tops' 1966 hit "Reach Out I'll Be There".

== Recovery work ==
In 2014, as part of a group of musicians in recovery or support the recovery lifestyle, Byrd performed at a Fed Up! rally in Washington, D.C. Two years later, he participated in the Rock and Roll for Children Foundation Annual concert at the Bethesda Blues and Jazz Club, a show that raised $50,000 for The Children’s Inn at the National Institute of Health.

Byrd became a certified recovery coach and a drug and alcohol counselor in 2018, and leads recovery music groups at drug treatment facilities. That year, Byrd joined Michael Des Barres, Liberty DeVitto and Paul Ill at the Rock and Roll Hall of Fame in Cleveland for a talk and performance of songs about addiction and recovery. The event benefited Recovery Resources, a Cleveland non-profit behavior healthcare organization.

"I’ve been in recovery since September 25, 1987. Given that gift, I have a responsibility to pass it on. The way I see it, there is a dark hallway filled with people in active addiction, stuck and struggling between denial and surrender. I'm here to be a power of example. To show that we CAN and DO recover. When someone is ready to reach out for help, I wanna be there at the end of that dark hallway waving him or her towards the light," explained Byrd.

In June 2019, New York State Senator Joseph P. Addabbo, Jr., 2019–2020 President of the Conference of Italian-American State Legislators, honored Byrd as someone who follows the mission "to foster and celebrate Italian-American contributions to all aspects of society to the State of New York and beyond." Fellow honorees included former Major League Baseball World Series catcher and manager Joe Girardi, and AFL–CIO President Mario Cilento.

"It was my distinct honor to acknowledge these three outstanding individuals for their impact and inspiration to the lives of others as a result of their actions and accomplishments," Addabbo said. "Ricky Byrd, for instance, has used his music, notoriety and personal struggle to help countless others who grapple with addiction. I am extremely proud to call Ricky Byrd a friend, constituent, neighbor and fellow Italian-American."

At the Fourth Annual Gala of the Rockit Live Foundation in August 2019, Byrd was honored for his work with young artists, in music education, and recovery. He performed live for the event that benefit the Rockit Live Foundation Scholarship Fund. All proceeds from this event will benefit the Rockit Live Foundation Scholarship Fund.

Also in August, Byrd joined Kathy Valentine (the Go-Go’s), Liberty Devitto (Billy Joel) and Genya Ravan (Goldie and the Gingerbreads, SiriusXM DJ), at the Rock and Roll Hall of Fame in Cleveland to discuss songwriting and perform songs about addiction and recovery. The event, called Rock & Resilience Community Day, was presented by Rock & Recovery (91.3 The Summit) and had booths with information from various recovery and treatment facilities.
