= Tulane (song) =

1969 song written and performed by Chuck Berry

Single by Chuck Berry

from the album Back Home
- B-side: "Have Mercy Judge"
- Released: August 1970
- Recorded: September 22, 1969
- Length: 2:39
- Label: Chess
- Songwriter: Chuck Berry
- Producer: Berry

Chuck Berry singles chronology
"Good Looking Woman" (1969)	"Tulane" (1970)	"Down the Road Apiece" (1972)

"Tulane" is a song written and performed by the American rock guitarist Chuck Berry, released as the only single from his fourteenth studio album Back Home (1970). It tells the story of a drug bust between drug dealers named Johnny and Tulane and the police leading to Johnny getting arrested and Tulane having to bail him out.

== Content ==
Recorded on September 22, 1969, "Tulane" follows the same musical format many other Chuck Berry songs used, which only further proved a point record producer Esmond Edwards made that Berry was playing the same song over and over again. Lyrically, the song follows a story about Johnny, a drug dealer with his business partner Tulane and they get busted, leading to Tulane having to bail him out after she manages to get away during the bust. The song got a sequel which served as the single's b-side titled "Have Mercy Judge", which extends on the story set in "Tulane", where the police have put Johnny in prison, and he sings about having to go to court the next day, and knowing that Tulane can't make it without him.

== Release and reception ==
"Tulane" served as the album's only single issued on Chess Records and labeled 2090. It was well received, with Record World stating that "Chuck Berry has returned to his old stamping ground with 'Tulane'", noting that "It's got that great driving sound you have to like". It is often cited as one of his greatest songs. Rolling Stone placed it in their unnumbered list of 20 of Berry's essential songs. Guitar Player critic Christopher Scapelliti states that "The harmonica playing of "Boogie" Bob Baldori dominates many of these later recordings, relegating Chuck's guitar work to the background, as on this taut rocker", noting that "As a result, the thrill comes not from Chuck's guitar playing but from his gift for storytelling, something that was in short supply in the later years of his recording career."

== Personnel ==
According to uDiscoverMusic:

- Chuck Berry – vocal, guitar
- Bob Baldori – harmonica
- Phil Upchurch – bass
- Lafayette Leake – piano

== Cover versions ==
=== Steve Gibbons Band version ===
"Tulane"

Single by Steve Gibbons Band

from the album Rollin' On
- B-side: "Now You Know Me"
- Released: 1977
- Length: 2:58
- Label: Polydor
- Songwriter: Chuck Berry
- Producer: Kenny Laguna

The Birmingham rock band the Steve Gibbons Band recorded their version for their 1977 album Rollin' On, it became a UK hit, peaking at number 12, but never did anything in the US.

==== Charts ====
Chart (1970)	Peak position
UK Singles (Official Charts)	12

=== Other versions ===
American rock band Joan Jett and the Blackhearts recorded their own version of the track for their 1988 album Up Your Alley.
