= Steve Gibbons (musician) =

British rock musician (born 1941)

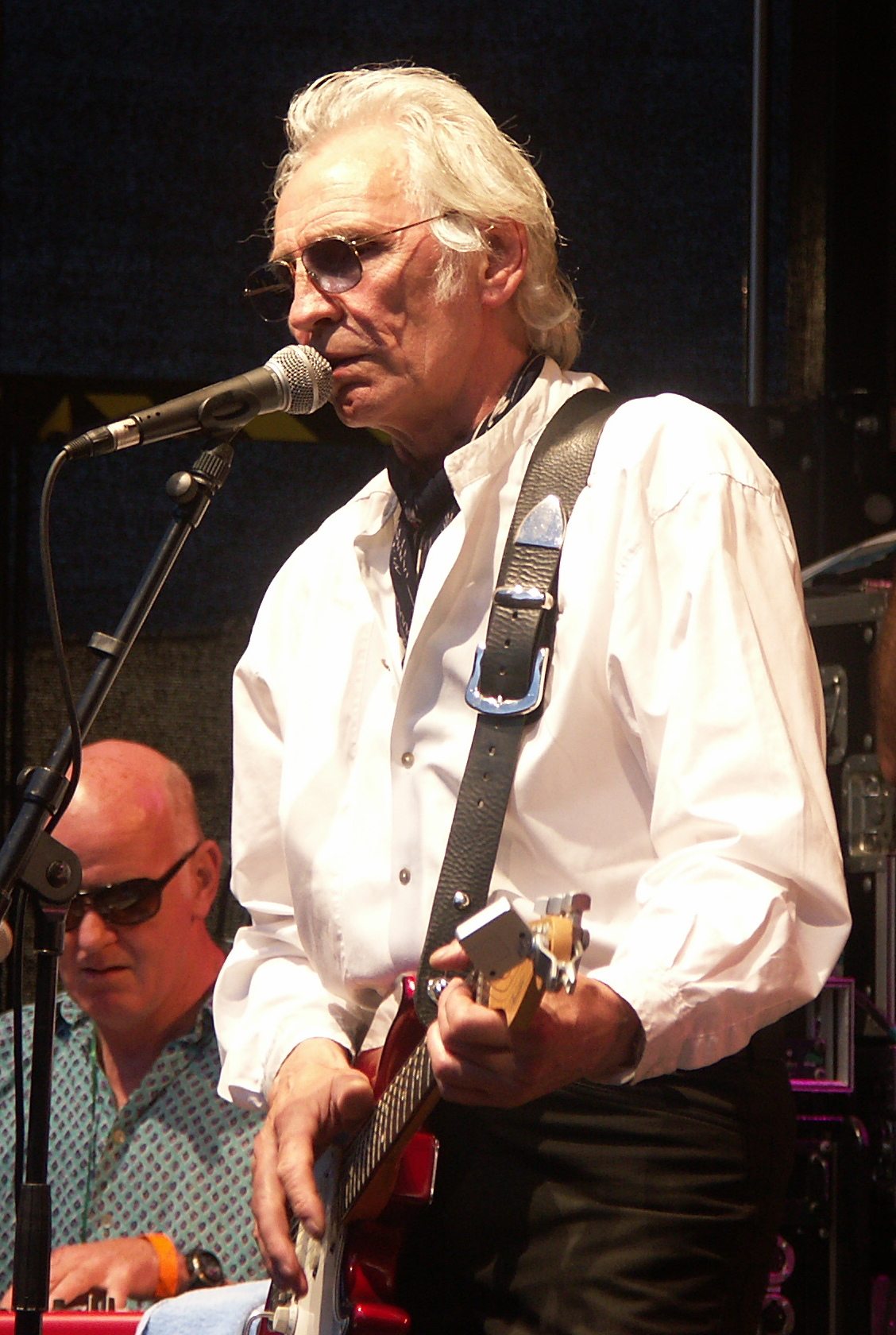
- Gibbons at the "Bardentreffen" Festival in 2009 at Nuremberg, Germany

Background information
- Born: 13 July 1941 (age 85); Harborne, Birmingham, England
- Genres: Rock
- Occupations: Singer; musician; songwriter; composer; record producer
- Instruments: Vocals; guitar; harmonica
- Years active: 1960s–present
- Labels: Polydor; MCA
- Formerly of: Balls; The Idle Race
- Website: stevegibbonsband.com

Steve Gibbons (born 13 July 1941) is an English singer-songwriter, guitarist and bandleader. His music career spans more than 50 years.

== Career ==
=== The Dominettes ===
Steve Gibbons started his professional life as a plumber's apprentice in Harborne. He joined the Dominettes in 1958, to replace Colin Smith, who had left to join Jimmy Powell's backing group. Colin Smith later changed his name to Carl Barron and became the singer with The Cheetahs. An Elvis Presley fan, Gibbons' first performance with The Dominettes was at The California public house near Weoley Castle.

Regular music venues for The Dominettes in the early 1960s were the Grotto Club on Bromsgrove Street, and The Sicilia Coffee Bar in Edgbaston. The group by this time included many R&B numbers into their set and this style of music suited Gibbons' gritty vocals. Although the Dominettes had a rougher image than most groups at that time, and were sometimes hired to back strippers at some of the more seedy establishments, they attracted quite a following. Another regular venue for the Dominettes was the Firebird Jazz Club on Carrs Lane in central Birmingham and the group posted advertisements which read "anything considered".

=== The Ugly's ===
By 1963, The Dominettes were renamed The Ugly's. The Ugly's secured a recording contract with Pye Records. The first release from the group in 1965 was an original song entitled "Wake Up My Mind", composed by Burnet, Holden and Gibbons. The single featured some socially conscious lyrics, very unlike the kind of material produced by most pop groups of the period. The record did not sell well in the United Kingdom, but was a big hit on the national Australian chart, reaching No. 14. John Gordon left in 1965, and was replaced by Jimmy O'Neill from a local band called The Yamps (he had also spent some time with The Walker Brothers). A second Ugly's single released the same year was "It's Alright". This one featured prominent use of a harpsichord, as played by O'Neill. The record fell short of the UK Singles Chart, despite the group's appearance on the television program, Ready Steady Go! to promote it.

Other Ugly's singles were released between 1965 and 1967, including a cover version of "End of the Season", a song composed by Ray Davies. This represented a departure from the Ugly's' previous records, as they had all been group compositions up to that point.

During this period, there were many personnel changes in the Ugly's line-up, including the departure of Bob Burnett and John Hustwayte. Bass guitarist Dave Pegg joined for a year before leaving to join the Ian Campbell Group. He was replaced by Dave Morgan from a local band called Blaises, and had also been a former member of Danny King's Mayfair Set. Dave Pegg was later in a local group called The Exception and from there, he joined Fairport Convention. Dave Morgan also composed the song "Something" which ended up as the b-side of The Move's chart-topping "Blackberry Way" single. Jimmy O'Neill left the Ugly's in 1968 to join The Mindbenders and founding member Jim Holden also departed later that year.

Former Brumbeats guitarist Roger Hill (1 January 1945, Erdington, Birmingham – 8 November 2011, Good Hope Hospital, Sutton Coldfield) joined the Ugly's and stayed for almost a year, before leaving to join Dave Pegg in The Exception. Roger Hill was replaced by Will Hammond (from The Yamps), who stayed in the Ugly's line-up until the end. Jim Holden was replaced by drummer Keith Smart from Danny King's Mayfair Set. Keyboard player Richard Tandy, who also played on the Move's "Blackberry Way", joined in 1968 and eventually joined the Electric Light Orchestra.

By the end of 1968, Gibbons was the only remaining original member of The Ugly's. This final line-up also included Will Hammond, Dave Morgan, Keith Smart, and Richard Tandy. They recorded a projected single "I've Seen The Light" which was never released.

=== Balls ===
Gibbons teamed up with guitarist Trevor Burton from The Move in 1969 and, by April of that year, they had formed a new group called Balls, along with singer/guitarist Denny Laine and Ugly's' drummer Keith Smart. The project was relatively short lived and after recording a solo album, Gibbons left the band in February 1971.

=== Idle Race ===
After the breakup of Balls, Gibbons returned to Birmingham from London to join The Idle Race for three months in 1971. This band rapidly evolved into the Steve Gibbons Band.

=== Steve Gibbons Band ===
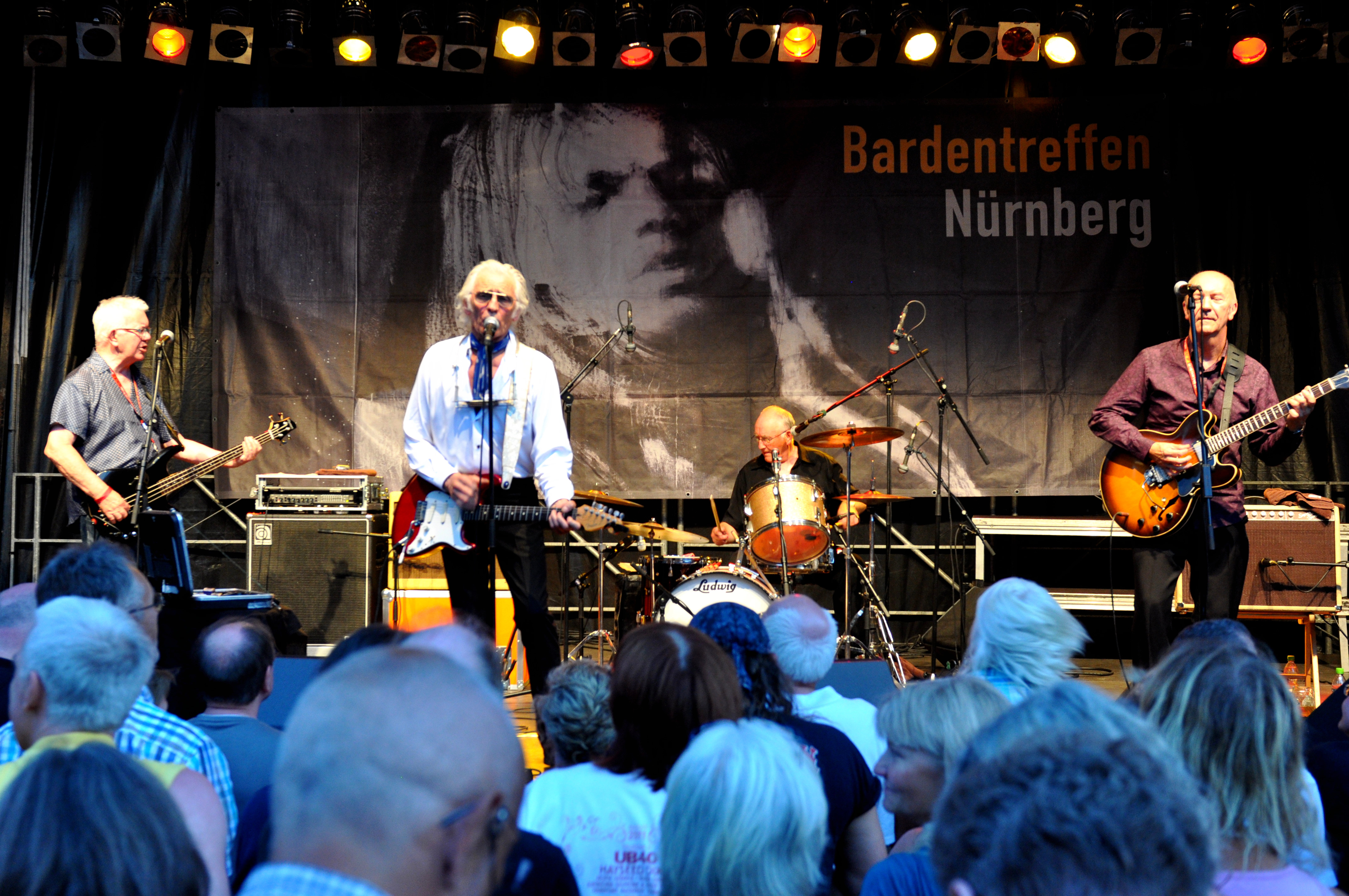
Gibbons with his band in 2015

The first line-up comprised Gibbons together with Dave Carroll and Bob Wilson on guitars, Bob Griffin on bass (who was replaced in 1972 by Trevor Burton), and Bob Lamb on drums. The new band worked the pub and club circuits until 1975 when they were spotted by Peter Meaden, former manager of the Who. This led to the Steve Gibbons Band joining the Who's management stable and recording their first Polydor album Any Road Up in 1975 (With John Entwistle of the Who playing on a few tracks). This was followed in 1976 by a tour with the Who in the UK, Europe and the United States. Playing the concert arenas, they shared the stage with Little Feat, Lynyrd Skynyrd, Electric Light Orchestra, The J. Geils Band, Rufus, and Nils Lofgren. In 1977 their second album, Rollin' On included their biggest hit single, "Tulane", a cover of a Chuck Berry song, and was produced by Kenny Laguna. "Tulane" reached No. 12 in the UK Singles Chart and spent eight weeks in the Top 40. They performed the song live on Show 4, of Marc Bolan's TV series Marc, broadcast on 14 September., 1977. 1977 also saw the release of the live album Caught in the Act. This band lineup made one further studio album with Polydor, Down in the Bunker (1978), produced by Tony Visconti. Gibbons made his last album with Polydor Street Parade (1980). This had a different band lineup after the breakup of the original band. Only Burton remained from the original lineup, with Robbie Blunt on guitar and Harry Rix on drums.

In 1981, after a further change in personnel, the Steve Gibbons Band had Burton now on guitar, PJ Wright on guitar, Derek Wood on bass and Alan "Sticky" Wickett on drums. They recorded Saints & Sinners for RCA, and later responded to an invitation from the German Democratic Republic to become one of the first western rock bands to tour the major cities of East Germany in 1982. Gibbons played at the Birmingham Heart Beat Charity Concert 1986, which featured George Harrison. Nine more albums were released in the 1980s and 1990s, and the touring continued.

=== The Dylan Project ===
Gibbons formed the Dylan Project in the late 1990s. The trio covered Bob Dylan songs and played material by Gibbons.

=== Brum Rocks ===
Gibbons continues to tour with his band, and is also a member of the hit UK show 'Brum Rocks Live', along with Bev Bevan (The Move, Electric Light Orchestra), Burton, Danny King, and writer Laurie Hornsby. The show toured the UK, and was produced and promoted by Brian Yeates Associates.

Gibbons lives with his wife Suzie in Edgbaston, Birmingham. They have two sons and a daughter.

Gibbons played in concert for the Newlife Foundation for Disabled Children in February 2011.

== Discography ==
=== With The Ugly's ===
==== Singles ====
- "Wake Up My Mind" (1965, Pye Records 7N.15858)
- "It's Alright" (1965, Pye Records 7N.15968)
- "A Good Idea" (1966, Pye Records 7N.17027)
- "End of the Season" (1966, Pye Records 7N.17178)
- "And the Squire Blew His Horn" (1967, CBS 2933)
- "I See the Light" (1969, MGM Records 1465)

=== With Balls ===
==== Singles ====
- "Fight for My Country" (1971, Wizard 101)

=== With Steve Gibbons Band ===
==== Studio albums ====
- Any Road Up (1976, Polydor 2383 381)
- Rollin' On (1977, Polydor 2383 433)
- Down in the Bunker (1978, Polydor 2383 502)
- Street Parade (1980, Polydor 1-6293)
- Saints & Sinners (1981, RCA 6017)
- Maintaining Radio Silence (1988) (Released in 1990, Episode Records LUS LP8)
- Birmingham to Memphis (1993, Linn Records AKD 019)
- Chasing Tales (2008, The Road Goes on Forever SGCD 067)

==== Live albums ====
- Caught in the Act (1977, Polydor 2478 112)
- On the Loose (1988, Magnum Force 041)
- Ridin' Out the Dark (1990, SPV Records 008-88291)
- Live at The Robin '98 (1998, Reckless Ltd.)

=== As solo ===
==== Studio albums ====
- Short Stories (1971, Wizard 5501)
- Stained Glass (1996, Havic Records 7003)
- The Dylan Project (1998, Woodworm Records 029)

=== With The Dylan Project ===
==== Studio albums ====
- The Dylan Project 2 (2005, Matty Grooves 042)

==== Live albums ====
- Live at Cropredy Festival, 1999 (2001, Woodworm Records 036)
- Caught in the Convent (2016, Hedge of Sound HOS23)

== Other sources ==
- Laurie Hornsby: Brum Rocked! The story of the people and places that shaped Birmingham's role in the history of rock edited by Mike Lavender with foreword by Carl Chinn, Birmingham 1999.
- Laurie Hornsby, Brum Rocked On! The people, places and passion that drove 60s Birmingham on through rock 'n' roll's finest decade edited by Mike Lavender, Birmingham 2003.
- Stefan Pürner/Michael Vonau:Steve Gibbons: Türöffner Ost – aus Birmingham (Steve Gibbons: Door opener to the East from Birmingham), in the Magazin GoodTimes – Music from the 60s to the 80s, 5/2016 Oktober/November 2016
- Jürgen Wanda: Blackberry Way MOVE, ELECTRIC LIGHT ORCHESTRA, Roy Wood, Jeff Lynne und Steve Gibbons, Star Cluster Publications, Berlag U. Zimmermann, Balve 1996,
