= I Love Rock 'n Roll (album) =

Studio album by Joan Jett and the Blackhearts
- Released: November 18, 1981
- Recorded: June–September 1981
- Studios: Kingdom Sound and Soundworks (Long Island, New York)
- Genre: Hard rock
- Length: 30:02
- Label: Boardwalk
- Producers: Kenny Laguna; Ritchie Cordell; Glen Kolotkin

Joan Jett and the Blackhearts chronology
Bad Reputation (1980)	I Love Rock 'n Roll (1981)	Album (1983)

Singles from I Love Rock 'n Roll
- 1. "I Love Rock 'n' Roll" Released: January 20, 1982; 2. "Crimson and Clover" Released: April 1982; 3. "Summertime Blues" Released: 1982 (Canada only)

I Love Rock 'n Roll is the second studio album by American rock singer Joan Jett and the first with her backing band the Blackhearts. The album was recorded during the summer of 1981 and was released in November. Soon after the first recording sessions at Soundworks Studios, original Blackhearts guitarist Eric Ambel was replaced by Ricky Byrd. It is Jett's most commercially successful album to date with over a million copies sold, largely due to the success of the title track, which was released as a single soon after the album was released.

== Background and recording ==
In 1976, Joan Jett saw "I Love Rock 'n' Roll" performed on TV by English rock band Arrows and was taken away by the song. It was a staple of her live set list for years before the album was recorded.

Along with the Arrows song, plenty of other cover versions populated the album:

- "Nag" (originally by the Halos);
- "Bits and Pieces" (The Dave Clark Five);
- "You're Too Possessive" (The Runaways); and
- "Crimson and Clover" (Tommy James and the Shondells).

Jett would later comment on the last song: "People worried that I didn't change the words in 'Crimson and Clover' to 'him' from 'her'. It was only because that wouldn't have rhymed."

Other covers appeared in limited editions. The CD release included "Louie Louie" (Richard Berry, later performed by the Kingsmen) and "Summertime Blues" (Eddie Cochran) as bonus tracks. The traditional Christmas carol "Little Drummer Boy" was a seasonal addition to the LP.

Jett recalled how I Love Rock 'n Roll was made at a vigorous pace: "During the weekdays we'd be in the studio and during the weekends we'd travel around the New York area, the Northeast, doing gigs. So we were doing both without really stopping. Which was good I thought, it really kept us together, it kept us sharp."

== Release ==
Early copies of the album released during December 1981 concluded with the track "Little Drummer Boy". However, after the holiday season, the track was replaced by the newly recorded "Oh Woe Is Me" on most pressings. The LP saw a vinyl reissue in 2009 containing both "Little Drummer Boy", "Oh Woe Is Me", and the rehearsal version of "You Don't Know What You've Got" that was the original B-side to Boardwalk Records U.S. and Canadian issues of the "I Love Rock 'n' Roll" single. It was possible to acquire "Oh Woe Is Me" without purchasing a replacement album, as it was also released as the B-side of the "Crimson and Clover" single.

"Summertime Blues" was originally left off the vinyl LP, and Boardwalk passed on releasing it as an official commercial single. Instead, Boardwalk placed the song as the B-side of "Do You Wanna Touch Me (Oh Yeah)", in a promo-only 12-inch release (Boardwalk NB-019-S-5) sent to US rock radio stations. Many DJs and programmers preferred the B-side however, and "Summertime Blues" became a Most Added listing. (The A-side nonetheless peaked at No. 20 on the Billboard Hot 100.) The song was eventually released as a one-sided single in Canada and as a 12-inch single in Australia, accompanied by "Do You Wanna Touch Me (Oh Yeah)".

In conjunction with Joan Jett and the Blackhearts being inducted into the Rock and Roll Hall of Fame on April 18, 2015, exactly 33 1/3 years after I Love Rock 'n Roll was originally released on November 18, 1981, a 2CD/2LP titled I Love Rock 'n Roll 33 1/3 Anniversary Edition was released. This commemorative edition paired the original album with a second disc of previously unreleased live recordings made in New York from 1981.

== Cover art ==
The portrait image used for the cover was taken by British photographer Mick Rock. It is widely considered one of the most iconic images in rock music history. Rock has said his vision for the portrait was clear: "I saw her as a female Elvis."

The styling played a part in Jett's overall appeal; Creem observed and asked rhetorically: "[...] who ever [sic] said that dark bangs and well-applied mascara had nothing to do with rock 'n' roll?"

Sounds described her look as the classic "tomboy rock girl", and quoted her regarding the record label's initial expectations:

"They wanted me to lie on a couch in leopardskin like Pat Benatar or something," she gasps, "You know I couldn't do anything like that!"

== Critical reception ==
Professional ratings
Review scores
Source	Rating
AllMusic	4/5 stars
Smash Hits	4/10
The Village Voice	B+

Creem's Mitchell Cohen gave I Love Rock 'n Roll a generally positive review, concluding that Jett "covers more ground than you might expect, and does so with contagious enthusiasm". Robert Christgau of The Village Voice qualified his praise of the album, writing, "Covering the Dave Clark Five and 'Little Drummer Boy' on the same side is a great schlock yea-saying move, but a move is all it is—makes me want to hear the originals rather than play the side again"; he also felt that Jett's original compositions lacked "spark".

Reviewing I Love Rock 'n Roll for AllMusic, Stephen Thomas Erlewine said that the Blackhearts' backing gave the album "a more coherent sound" than that of Jett's previous studio album Bad Reputation, as well as "dimension". While noting a relative lack of "strong songs", on the whole he found that the band's "muscular, gritty" playing makes I Love Rock 'n Roll "just as good as Bad Reputation."

== Track listing ==
Side one
No.	Title	Writer(s)	Length
1.	"I Love Rock 'n Roll"	Alan Merrill; Jake Hooker	2:55
2.	"(I'm Gonna) Run Away"	Joan Jett; Kenny Laguna	2:28
3.	"Love Is Pain"	Jett	3:06
4.	"Nag"	Arthur Crier	2:43
5.	"Crimson and Clover"	Tommy James; Peter Lucia Jr.	3:16

Side two
No.	Title	Writer(s)	Length
6.	"Victim of Circumstance"	Jett; Laguna	2:54
7.	"Bits and Pieces"	Dave Clark; Mike Smith	2:06
8.	"Be Straight"	Jett; Greg Kihn; Laguna	2:41
9.	"You're Too Possessive" (The Runaways Re-Recording)	Jett	3:35
10.	"Little Drummer Boy"	Katherine K. Davis; Henry Onorati; Harry Simeone	4:14
Total length:			30:02

1992 remastered CD edition bonus tracks
No.	Title	Writer(s)	Length
11.	"Oh Woe Is Me"	Jett	2:43
12.	"Louie Louie"	Richard Berry	2:49
13.	"You Don't Know What You Got" (live)	Jett; Laguna; Ritchie Cordell	2:44

1998 remastered CD edition bonus tracks
No.	Title	Writer(s)	Length
14.	"Summertime Blues"	Eddie Cochran; Jerry Capehart	2:20
15.	"Nag" (previously unreleased version with the Coasters)	Crier	2:51

I Love Rock 'n Roll (33 1/3 Anniversary Edition), Disc 2 Live, New York, 1981
No.	Title	Writer(s)	Length
1.	"I Love Rock 'n Roll"	Hooker; Merrill	2:55
2.	"(I'm Gonna) Run Away"	Jett; Laguna	2:28
3.	"Love Is Pain"	Jett	3:06
4.	"Nag"	Crier	2:43
5.	"Crimson and Clover"	Tommy James	3:16
6.	"Victim of Circumstance"	Jett; Laguna	2:54
7.	"Bits and Pieces"	Clark; Smith	2:06
8.	"Be Straight"	Jett; Kihn; Laguna	2:41
9.	"You're Too Possessive"	Jett	3:35
10.	"Black Leather"	Steve Jones	3:33
Total length:			29:25

== Personnel ==
Personnel taken from I Love Rock 'n Roll liner notes.

Joan Jett and the Blackhearts

- Joan Jett – lead vocals, rhythm guitar
- Ricky Byrd – lead guitar, backing vocals
- Gary Ryan – bass, backing vocals
- Lee Crystal – drums

Additional musicians

- Eric Ambel – lead guitar, backing vocals on tracks 5 and 10
- Will "Dub" Jones – vocals on track 10
- The Coasters – backing vocals on track 15
- Kenny Laguna – keyboards, percussion, backing vocals

Production team

- Kenny Laguna – production
- Ritchie Cordell – production
- Glen Kolotkin – associate producer; engineering
- Gerry Gabinelli – engineer
- Stew Romain – mastering
- Bob Ludwig – 1992 remastering at Masterdisk, New York

== Charts ==
=== Weekly charts ===
Chart (1982)	Peak position
Australian Albums (Kent Music Report)	10
Austrian Albums (Ö3 Austria)	14
Canada Top Albums/CDs (RPM)	1
Dutch Albums (Album Top 100)	7
Finnish Albums (Suomen virallinen lista)	13
German Albums (Offizielle Top 100)	31
New Zealand Albums (RMNZ)	1
Norwegian Albums (VG-lista)	38
Swedish Albums (Sverigetopplistan)	4
UK Albums (Official Charts)	25
US Billboard 200	2

=== Year-end charts ===
Chart (1982)	Position
Canada Top Albums/CDs (RPM)	6
New Zealand Albums (RMNZ)	23
US Billboard 200	22

== Certifications ==
Region	Certification	Certified units/sales
Australia (ARIA)	Platinum	50,000^{^}
Canada (Music Canada)	2× Platinum	200,000^{^}
New Zealand (RMNZ)	Gold	7,500^{^}
United States (RIAA)	Platinum	1,000,000^{^}
^{^} Shipments figures based on certification alone.
