= Joan Jett and the Blackhearts =

American rock band

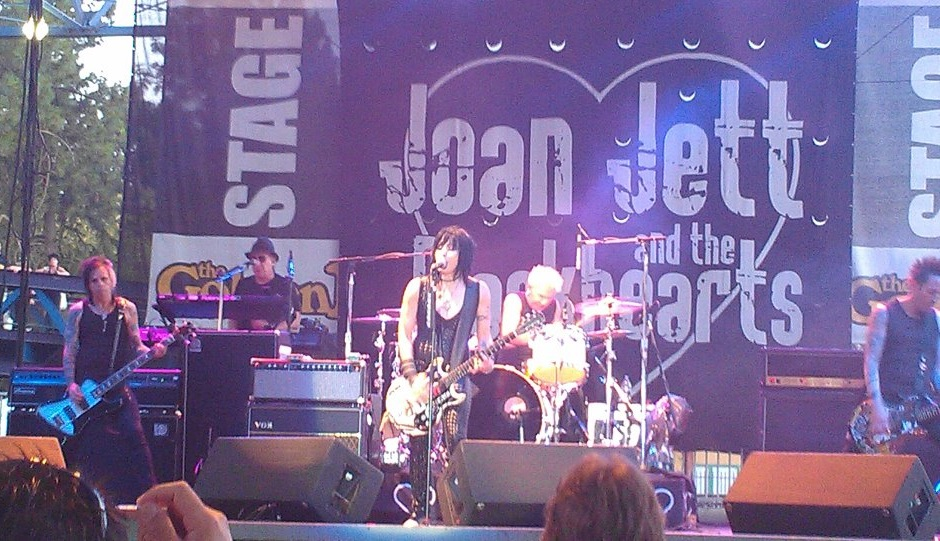
- Joan Jett and the Blackhearts performing in Sacramento, California, 2012

Background information
- Origin: USA
- Genres: Hard rock; punk rock; new wave; power pop
- Years active: 1979–present
- Labels: Blackheart; Epic; Boardwalk; MCA; CBS; Warner Bros.; Polydor; Chrysalis; Bellaphon; Mercury
- Members: Joan Jett; Dougie Needles; Kenny Laguna; Hal B. Selzer; Michael McDermott
- Past members: Ricky Byrd; Tony Rey; Gary Ryan; Kasim Sulton; Phil Feit; Kenny Aaronson; Sean Koos; Sami Yaffa; Enzo Penizzotto; Acey Slade; Lee Crystal; Eric Ambel; Thommy Price

Joan Jett and the Blackhearts is an American rock band formed in Los Angeles, California in 1979 as a conjunction of lead musician, singer and songwriter Joan Jett and the backup band. It has undergone many lineup changes since its inception, with founders Jett and producer Kenny Laguna being its only consistent members.

Three albums by Joan Jett and the Blackhearts have been certified platinum or gold. Their hit singles include "Bad Reputation", "Fake Friends", "Good Music", "Light of Day", "Little Liar", "I Hate Myself for Loving You", and the covers "Crimson and Clover", "Do You Wanna Touch Me (Oh Yeah)", "Dirty Deeds", "Everyday People", "Cherry Bomb" and "I Love Rock 'n Roll".

In 2015, the lineup consisting of Jett, Laguna, bassist Gary Ryan, drummer Lee Crystal, and guitarist Ricky Byrd were inducted into the Rock and Roll Hall of Fame.

== History ==
=== Beginnings ===
In 1979, while fulfilling an obligation of the Runaways to complete a film based on the band's career, guitarist and singer-songwriter Joan Jett met songwriter and producer Kenny Laguna, who was hired by her manager Toby Mamis to help Jett with writing some tracks for that film. They became friends and decided to work together and Jett relocated to Long Beach, New York, where Laguna was based. The plug was pulled on the project halfway through shooting after Jett fell ill, but in 1984, after she became famous, producers looked for a way to use the footage from the incomplete film. Parts of the original footage of Jett were eventually used in another project, an underground film called Du-beat-eo, which was produced by Alan Sacks, but not commercially released.

=== 1980s: Formation and mainstream success ===
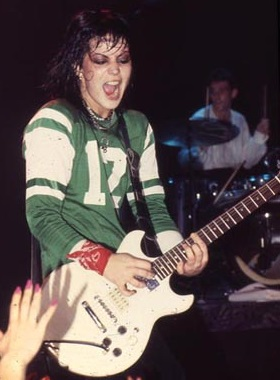
Jett performing live with the Gibson Melody Maker in Norway, during the 1980s

After collaborating on Jett's self-titled solo debut, which was released independently on Jett and Laguna's Blackheart Records label after the album was rejected by 23 major labels, Jett formed the Blackhearts with Laguna's assistance. Laguna recounted, "I told Joanie to forget the band and support herself on the advance money. There was enough for her but not for a band. She said she had to have a band. And I believe to this day that it was the Blackhearts, that concept, that made Joan Jett." She placed an ad in the LA Weekly stating that she was "looking for three good men". John Doe of X sat in on bass for the auditions held at S.I.R. studios in Los Angeles. He mentioned a local bass player, Gary Ryan, who had recently been crashing on his couch. Ryan was born Gary Moss, and adopted his stage name upon joining the Blackhearts in 1979, in part to cover up the fact that he was only 15 at the time. Ryan was part of the Los Angeles punk scene and had played bass with local artists Top Jimmy and Rik L. Rik. He had been a fan of the Runaways and Jett for years. Jett recognized him at the audition and he was in. Ryan in turn recommended guitarist Eric Ambel, who was also at the time part of Rik L. Rik. The final addition to the original Blackhearts was drummer Danny "Furious" O'Brien, formerly of the San Francisco band the Avengers. This lineup played several gigs at the Golden Bear, in Huntington Beach, California, and the Whisky a Go Go in Hollywood before embarking on their first European tour, which consisted of an extensive tour of the Netherlands and a few key shows in England, including the Marquee in London.

Laguna fired O'Brien at the end of the tour, and upon returning to the States, Jett, Ryan, and Ambel moved to Long Beach, New York. Auditions were set up, and Lee Crystal, formerly of the Boyfriends and Sylvain Sylvain, became the new drummer. The band then toured throughout the US, slowly building a fan base, but struggling to remain financially afloat. Throughout 1980, the band was able to keep touring solely due to Laguna drawing on advances from outside projects. Jett and Laguna used their personal savings to press copies of the Joan Jett album and set up their own system of distribution, sometimes selling the albums out of the trunk of Laguna's Cadillac at the end of each concert. Laguna was unable to keep up with demand for the album. Eventually, old friend and founder of Casablanca Records, Neil Bogart, made a joint venture with Laguna and signed Jett to his new label, Boardwalk Records, and re-released the Joan Jett album as Bad Reputation.

A spring 1981 concert at the Palladium in New York City proved to be a turning point. Described by music journalists as a career-defining performance by Jett, it helped solidify a strong New York City following for Joan Jett and the Blackhearts. After a year of touring and recording, the Blackhearts recorded a new album entitled I Love Rock 'n Roll for the label. Ambel was replaced by local guitarist Ricky Byrd during the recording. Byrd recalled in an interview with Guitarhoo!, "One day I went to a studio to jam around a bit with Jett and everything clicked". The first single from the album was the title track, a cover of Arrows' 1975 single, "I Love Rock 'n' Roll", which in the first half of 1982 was number one on the Billboard Hot 100 for seven weeks in a row. It is Billboard's No. 56 song of all time and has also been inducted into the Grammy Hall of Fame in 2016.

Jett released Album (1983) and Glorious Results of a Misspent Youth (1984). A string of Top 40 hits followed, as well as sellout tours with the Police, Queen, and Aerosmith, among others. She was among the first English-speaking rock acts to appear in Panama and the Dominican Republic. According to Jett and Laguna, a riot occurred during their visit to Panama and Manuel Noriega requested Jett spend the night with him at the Presidential Palace.

In 1987, Ryan and Crystal left the Blackhearts. They were soon replaced by Thommy Price and Kasim Sulton. Later that year, Jett released Good Music, which featured appearances by the Beach Boys, the Sugarhill Gang, and singer Darlene Love.

Joan Jett and the Blackhearts became the first rock band to perform a series of shows at the Lunt–Fontanne Theatre on Broadway, breaking the record at the time for the fastest ticket sell-out. Her next release, Up Your Alley, went multi-platinum. This album contains the single "I Hate Myself for Loving You", which peaked at No. 8 on the Billboard Hot 100 chart, and had been used as the theme song for Sunday Night Football NFL games in America (with altered lyrics, by two singers) during the 2006 and 2007 seasons.

=== 1990s and 2000s ===
In 1990, the band had a song on Days of Thunder's soundtrack, "Long Live the Night", written by Jett with Randy Cantor and Michael Caruso. Her 1991 release, Notorious, which featured the Replacements' Paul Westerberg and former Billy Idol bass player Phil Feit, was the last with Sony/CBS, as Jett switched to Warner Bros.

In June 2006, Jett released her album Sinner, on Blackheart Records. To support the album, the band appeared on the 2006 Warped Tour and on a fall 2006 tour with Eagles of Death Metal. Various other bands such as Antigone Rising, Valient Thorr, the Vacancies, Throw Rag and Riverboat Gamblers were to have joined the tour for a handful of dates each. Jett sang a duet with Chase Noles on "Tearstained Letters", a song on the Heart Attacks' 2006 album, Hellbound and Heartless.

Joan Jett & the Blackhearts headlined the Albuquerque, New Mexico Freedom Fourth celebration on July 4, 2007, with an estimated crowd of 65,000 in attendance at the annual outdoor event. In November 2007, Joan Jett & the Blackhearts appeared with Motörhead and Alice Cooper in a UK arena tour; Jett opened eight American shows on Aerosmith's 2007 World Tour.

Following the Dave Clark Five's induction to the Rock and Roll Hall of Fame, on March 10, 2008, Jett, as part of the ceremony, closed the program with a performance of the Dave Clark Five's 1964 hit "Bits and Pieces". Joan Jett & the Blackhearts appeared on several dates of the True Colors tour in the summer of 2008. She opened for Def Leppard in August.

=== 2010s ===
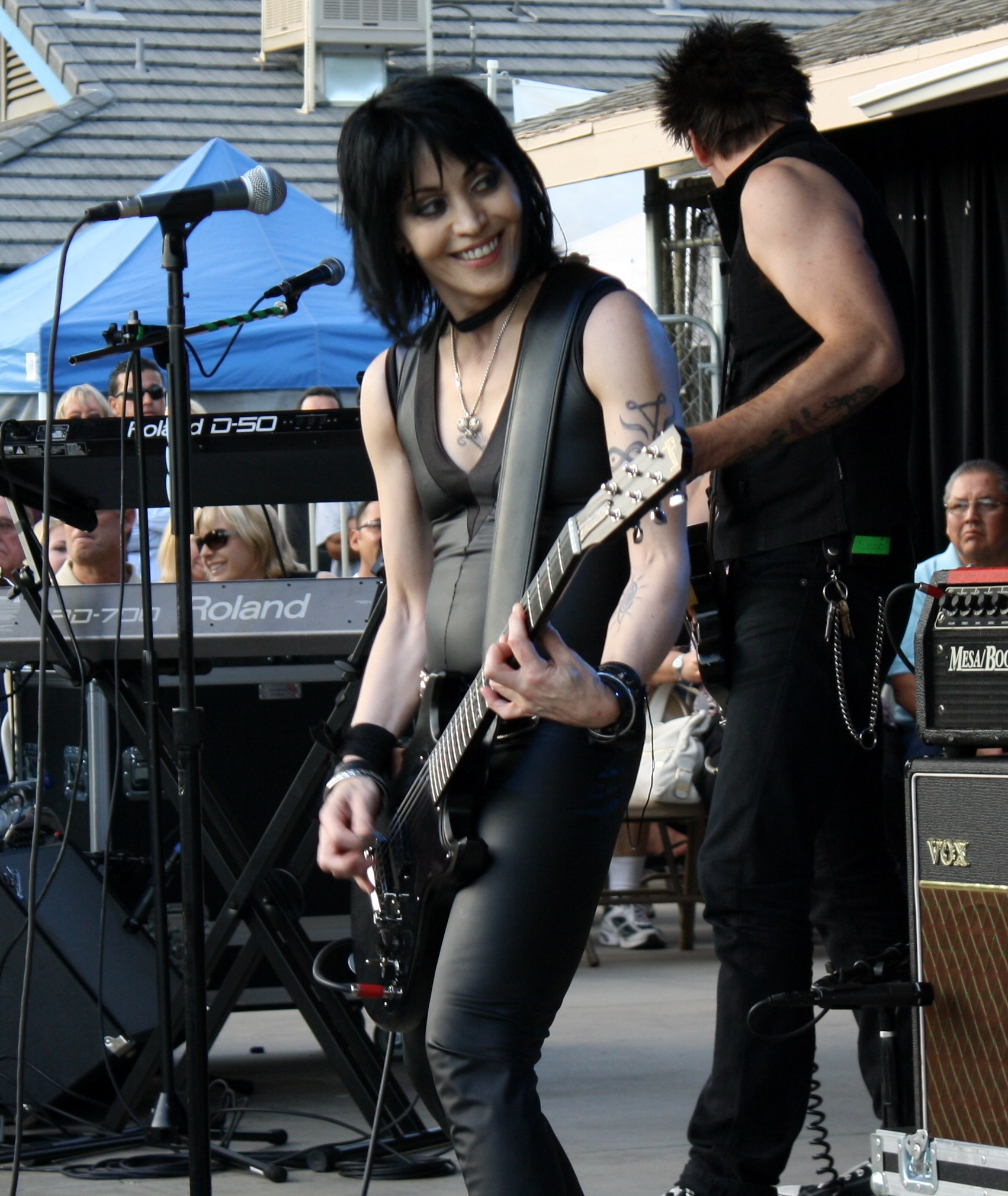
Jett performing live with the Blackhearts in Beaumont, California, during the 2010 Free Concert Series

Joan Jett & the Blackhearts were part of the lineup for the Falls Music & Arts Festival, December 29 through January 1, 2010, in Australia. In March 2010, she released a 2-LP/CD Greatest Hits album with four newly re-recorded songs, as well as a hardcover biography, spanning her career from the Runaways to the present day. In June 2010, Joan Jett & the Blackhearts opened for Green Day on their UK tour alongside acts such as Frank Turner and Paramore. The band was the opening act for Aerosmith's September 2010 Canadian tour.

Jett, along with the Blackhearts, released the album Unvarnished on September 30, 2013. The album reached Billboard's Top 50. It included songs dealing with the death of her parents and other people.

Former Blackhearts drummer Lee Crystal (born Lee Jamie Sackett in 1956 in Brooklyn, New York) died from complications of multiple sclerosis on November 5, 2013, at the age of 57.

On July 12, 2014, Joan Jett and the Blackhearts performed at Tropicana Field after the baseball game in St. Petersburg, Florida. On October 29, 2014, Jett sang the U.S. national anthem at the New York Knicks vs. the Chicago Bulls basketball game. Jett and Hot Topic released Jett's first clothing line in 2014. It consists of jackets, shirts, pants, and a sweater.

Joan Jett and the Blackhearts were inducted in the Rock and Roll Hall of Fame in 2015. On April 15, 2015, Jett & the Blackhearts opened for the Who, kicking off their "The Who Hits 50!" 2015 North American tour in Tampa, Florida. The Blackhearts opened for the Who for 42 dates in the U.S. and Canada, ending November 4 in Philadelphia. On July 4, 2015, Joan Jett & the Blackhearts were part of the Foo Fighters' 20th anniversary show at the RFK Stadium in Washington, D.C.

In September 2018, Jett signed a music distribution deal with Sony Music's Legacy Recordings, making her catalog officially available for streaming.

=== 2020s ===
Jett, along with the Blackhearts, was scheduled to join Mötley Crüe and Def Leppard on the 2020 The Stadium Tour as an opening act along with Poison however tour was postponed to the summer of 2021 due to the COVID-19 pandemic. In May 2021 it was announced that tour was again postponed and will now happen in the summer of 2022. Jett announced that she will embark on a North American tour in the fall of 2021. The tour ended on September 28, 2021, at the Paramount in Huntington, NY.

Joan Jett and the Blackhearts released Changeup on March 25, 2022, the first acoustic album ever recorded by the band, featuring "Bad Reputation" and "Crimson and Clover". On June 2, 2023, Joan Jett and the Blackhearts released the 6 song EP, Mindsets. The EP the band's first release of new material in ten years. Jett played a post pandemic welcome back concert in honor of first responders in the summer of 2022 at the Nassau County Harry Chapin Lakeside Theatre hosted by Nassau County Executive Bruce Blakeman that set a record attendance of 27,000 concert attendees.

== Band members ==
Current members

- Joan Jett – lead vocals, rhythm guitar (1979–present), lead guitar (1996–1999)
- Dougie Needles – lead guitar, backing vocals (1999–present)
- Kenny Laguna – keyboards, backing vocals (2004–present)
- Hal B. Selzer – bass, backing vocals (2015–present)
- Michael McDermott – drums (2016–present)

Past members

- Ricky Byrd – lead guitar, backing vocals (1981–1993)
- Tony Rey – lead guitar, backing vocals (1993–1996)
- Gary Ryan – bass, backing vocals (1979–1987)
- Kasim Sulton – bass, backing vocals, (1987–1991)
- Phil Feit – bass, backing vocals (1991–1992)
- Kenny Aaronson – bass, backing vocals (1992–1996)
- Sean Koos – bass, backing vocals (1996–2002)
- Sami Yaffa – bass, backing vocals (2002–2004)
- Enzo Penizzotto – bass, backing vocals (2004–2010)
- Acey Slade – bass, backing vocals (2010–2015)
- Danny O'Brien – drums (1979–1980)
- Lee Crystal – drums (1981–1987, died 2013), backing vocals (1983–1987)
- Eric Ambel – lead guitar, backing vocals (1979–1981)
- Thommy Price – drums (1987–2016, died 2025)

== Discography ==
- I Love Rock 'n Roll (1981)
- Album (1983)
- Glorious Results of a Misspent Youth (1984)
- Good Music (1986)
- Up Your Alley (1988)
- Notorious (1991)
- Pure and Simple (1994)
- Naked (2004)
- Sinner (2006)
- Unvarnished (2013)
- Changeup (2022)
- Mindsets (2023)

== Awards and nominations ==
=== Grammy Awards ===
The Grammy Awards are awarded annually by the National Academy of Recording Arts and Sciences. Joan Jett and the Blackhearts have one nomination.

Year	Nominee / work	Award	Result
1989	"I Hate Myself for Loving You"	Best Rock Performance by a Duo or Group with Vocal	Nominated

=== Juno Awards ===
The Juno Awards are awarded annually by the Canadian Academy of Recording Arts and Sciences. Joan Jett and the Blackhearts have one nomination.

Year	Nominee / work	Award	Result
1983	"I Love Rock 'n' Roll"	International Single of the Year	Nominated

=== Rock and Roll Hall of Fame ===
The Rock and Roll Hall of Fame is a museum located on the shores of Lake Erie in downtown Cleveland, Ohio, United States, dedicated to the recording history of some of the best-known and most influential musicians, bands, producers, and other people who have influenced the music industry. Joan Jett and the Blackhearts were inducted in 2015.

Year	Nominee / work	Award	Result
2015	Joan Jett and the Blackhearts	Hall of Fame	Won
