= Lee Crystal =

American drummer (1956–2013)

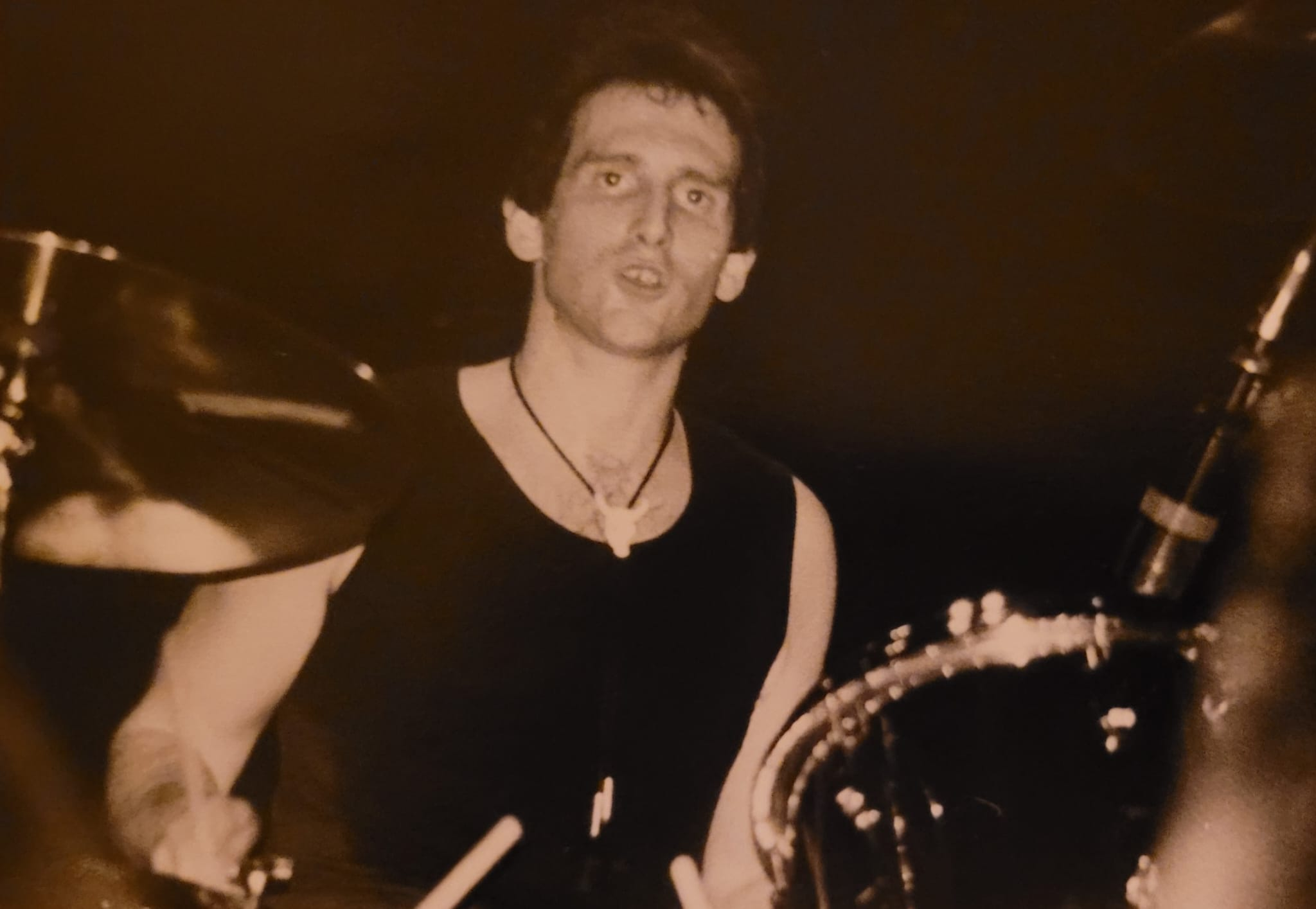
- Crystal performing in 1984

Background information
- Born: Lee Jamie Sackett; February 3, 1956; Brooklyn, New York City, U.S.
- Origin: Coney Island, New York City, U.S.
- Died: November 5, 2013 (aged 57) Maplewood, New Jersey, U.S.
- Occupation: Drummer
- Instrument: Drums
- Years active: 1979–1986
- Formerly of: Joan Jett and the Blackhearts

Lee Jamie Sackett (February 3, 1956 – November 5, 2013), better known as Lee Crystal, was an American drummer, most prominently as a member of Joan Jett and the Blackhearts. Crystal was the drummer during the band's most prolific and popular period from 1981 to 1986, including the album I Love Rock 'n Roll (1981) and that album's title track, which stayed atop the Billboard charts for seven weeks in 1982.

== Early life ==
Sackett grew up in Coney Island, Brooklyn, New York, as he would say, "across the street from the Cyclone." When he was 17, a car hit him while he was riding a bicycle. After receiving a settlement from the accident, Crystal was able to purchase his first drum kit, which had been left over from a drum clinic run by Brooklyn drummer Carmine Appice. Crystal also studied under drummer Bernard Purdie, whom Crystal said, "influenced me a great deal in really keeping a backbeat."

== Musical career ==
Crystal first gained attention in the New York City rock club scene as a member of The Boyfriends, which recorded one single for Bomp Records, "I Don't Want Nobody (I Want You)." The Boyfriends earned a strong cult following, opening for the Ramones and the Dead Boys, and playing at New York City clubs such as CBGB and Max's Kansas City. After leaving The Boyfriends, Crystal worked with three former members of the New York Dolls. He toured with Sylvain Sylvain and played on Sylvain's self-titled first solo album, cowriting the single "Every Boy, Every Girl." Crystal also played club dates with Johnny Thunders and the Heartbreakers, as well as with David Johansen.

Crystal auditioned for the Blackhearts in 1981. He stated, "Joan Jett was what I needed. I wanted to play real rock and roll." Crystal stayed with the band until 1986, during which the band enjoyed its commercial and creative peak. During the recording of the Good Music album, Jett began working with other musicians, expressing a desire to "add different flavors and ideas." Crystal and bassist Gary Ryan left the band in 1986 following the release of Good Music.

After his departure from the Blackhearts, Crystal and Ryan played in two short-lived bands, Secret Chiefs, who toured Scandinavia, and Crash Conference.

== Later years ==
Upon retiring from the music industry, Crystal sold furniture in Manhattan and gave music lessons from his home, where he would tell his students to "get real familiar with your drums, because you'll be hitting them." In 1993, he was diagnosed with multiple sclerosis. A resident of Maplewood, New Jersey, he died from the illness in 2013. As a member of Joan Jett and the Blackhearts, Crystal was inducted into the Rock and Roll Hall of Fame in 2015 by his wife, the former Maura Shea. He is survived by his wife, two sons, Sean Sackett (b. 1989) and Cameron Sackett (b. 1992), and a brother, Jay Sackett.

Modern Drummer magazine stated that rock and roll drumming is "meant to inspire rockin' and rollin' and singin' and dancin'. And that's the kind of beat that Lee Crystal plays so well."
