= Bunker Hill (musician) =

American musician (1941–86)

David Walker (May 5, 1941 – March 12, 1986), better known by his stage name Bunker Hill, was an American rhythm & blues, rock and gospel singer.

Born and raised in Washington, D.C., Walker sought a career in professional boxing, at one point becoming the sparring partner of Archie Moore. He left boxing to pursue a career singing gospel, and in the late 1950s joined the Mighty Clouds of Joy.

In 1962 he was offered the chance to record a secular novelty song by manager Ray Vernon, the brother of Link Wray. Adopting the pseudonym Bunker Hill so as not to lose his position with the Mighty Clouds of Joy, he recorded several tracks with a band including Link Wray on guitar. One of the tracks, "Hide and Go Seek", became a hit single in the United States, reaching #27 on the Billboard R&B charts and #33 on the Billboard Hot 100, and was featured in the 1988 movie Hairspray. Despite hiding his identity, he was still found out and asked to leave the Mighty Clouds of Joy as a result.

His later life is obscure, although it is believed that he did perform occasionally as a member of the Mighty Clouds of Joy before leaving the music industry in the late 1960s. According to researchers Bob Eagle and Eric LeBlanc, he died in Houston, Texas in 1986, aged 44.

== Discography ==
=== Link Wray recordings ===
- Hide & Go Seek, Part 1 / Hide & Go Seek, Part 2 (6/1962)
- Red Ridin' Hood And The Wolf / Nobody Knows (11/1962)
- There's A Hole In The Middle Of The Moon / Friday Night Dance Party (1963)
  - b-side features Bunker Hill on background vocals; possibly unreleased
- The Girl Can't Dance / You Can't Make Me Doubt My Baby (9/1963)

=== The Mighty Clouds Of Joy singles ===
- Somebody Touched Me / Walk Around My Lord (1958)
  - group credited as "Joe Ligon with The Sensational Wonders"
  - David Walker on background vocals
- Rock'n'Roll Dice / Rock Honey Rock (1959)
  - Whalen J. Jones possibly features The Sensational Wonders with David Walker on background vocals
- Silly Symphony Band / Don't Teep Me Tanding (1959)
  - Carolyn Waits with The Sensational Wonders
  - probably features David Walker on background vocals on a-side
- Rockin' Rollin' Baby Moon / Forlorn Heart (1959)
  - Wailin' J. Jones with The Sensational Wonders, probably with David Walker on background vocals
- Build Me A Cabin In Glory / That's What He Is To Me (1959)
  - group credited as "The Sensational Clouds Of Joy"
  - lead vocals by Joe Ligon, possibly features David Walker on background vocals
- Jesus Lead Us Safely / Ain't Got Long Here (1961)
  - features David Walker on lead vocals on a-side
- My Religion / I'll Be Alright (10/1961)
  - features David Walker on 2nd lead vocals on a-side
- Sleep Tight / True Love (Is Hard To Find) (1961)
  - possibly features The Mighty Clouds of Joy on backing vocals on a-side
- Nearer To Thee / You'll Never Know (1963)
  - features David Walker lead vocals on b-side

=== The Mighty Clouds Of Joy albums ===
- Family Circle (1963)
  - Features "You'll Never Know"
