= Ritchie Cordell =

American songwriter and record producer (1943–2004)

Background information
- Born: Richard Joel Rosenblatt; March 10, 1943; Brooklyn, New York, U.S.
- Died: April 13, 2004 (aged 61) New York, U.S.
- Genres: Pop; rock
- Occupations: Songwriter; singer; record producer

Ritchie Cordell (born Richard Joel Rosenblatt; March 10, 1943 – April 13, 2004) was an American songwriter, singer and record producer. He wrote and produced several hits for Tommy James and the Shondells, including "I Think We're Alone Now" (later also recorded by Lene Lovich, Tiffany and Girls Aloud) and "Mony Mony" (later also recorded by Billy Idol), and co-produced Joan Jett's I Love Rock 'n Roll.

== Biography ==
Rosenblatt was born in Brooklyn, New York, and started singing and playing guitar in his teens. In 1961, he was introduced to song plugger Sid Prosen, who in turn introduced him to young songwriter Paul Simon, then using the pseudonym Jerry Landis. Rosenblatt began using the name Ritchie Cordell, initially as a performer, and "Landis" wrote the song "Tick Tock" which became Cordell's first single, released on the Rori label in 1962. Cordell then started writing his own material, including his single "Georgiana" which was arranged and produced by Landis.

He worked for a time at Kama Sutra Records, but had limited success as either a writer or performer before joining Roulette Records as a staff songwriter in 1966. At Roulette, he began working with Tommy James and the Shondells, who had just had their first hit, "Hanky Panky". With Sal Trimachi, Cordell co-wrote their third record, "It's Only Love"; as on many of the group's Roulette recordings, the writing credit was shared with record company boss Morris Levy, who garnered royalty monies in the process. As well as writing "I Think We're Alone Now" (which reached No. 4 on the US Billboard Hot 100 in 1967) and co-writing "Mony Mony" (No. 3 in 1968, and No. 1 in the UK), Cordell also wrote several lesser hits for the group.

In the late 1960s, he left Roulette to join Super K Productions, a company set up by producers Jerry Kasenetz and Jeffry Katz. Cordell co-wrote several hits for the company, notably "Gimme Gimme Good Lovin'" (co-written with Joey Levine and recorded by Crazy Elephant, 1968); and "Indian Giver" (co-written with Bobby Bloom and Bo Gentry, and recorded by the 1910 Fruitgum Co., 1969).

In the 1970s, he continued to work as a music publisher, songwriter and producer, before finding renewed success in 1981 as the co-producer of Joan Jett and the Blackhearts' version of "I Love Rock 'n' Roll", which reached No. 1 in the US and No. 4 in the UK, and its eponymous album. Cordell also co-produced the Ramones' 1983 album Subterranean Jungle, and worked with British post-punk new wave band Bow Wow Wow. In 1987, he enjoyed the rare feat of having one of his songs (Tiffany's "I Think We're Alone Now") replaced by another (Billy Idol's "Mony Mony") at the top of the US Hot 100.

Cordell died of pancreatic cancer in New York in 2004, at the age of 61.
