= Boardwalk Records =

American record label

- Parent company: Boardwalk Entertainment Group
- Founded: 1980 (original); 2010 (relaunch)
- Founder: Neil Bogart
- Defunct: 1983 (original)
- Distributor: CBS Records via independent distribution
- Genre: Various
- Country of origin: United States

Boardwalk Records is a record label founded by Neil Bogart in 1980, after PolyGram acquired Casablanca Records from him.

== History ==
The label had hit acts with Joan Jett and Harry Chapin. Other artists on the Boardwalk label included, Invisible Mans Band, produced by Alex Masucci and Clarence Burke Jr. Night Ranger, Ringo Starr, Curtis Mayfield, Ohio Players, Richard "Dimples" Fields, Chris Christian, Starpoint, Sunrize, Mike Love, Get Wet, Phil Seymour, Tierra and Carole Bayer Sager. Boardwalk Records also released the soundtracks for the 1980 film version of Popeye, which starred Robin Williams and Shelley Duvall, and for the 1982 film Megaforce.

Throughout its existence, Bellaphon Records served as Boardwalk's distributor in Germany, United Kingdom, Switzerland and Austria.

Chris Christian was the first artist signed to Boardwalk. In late 1981, "I Want You I Need You" became a #37 Top 40 Billboard pop hit and Top 10 adult contemporary hit for Christian. Robert Kardashian, Kim Kardashian's father, was Christian's manager and was responsible for signing Christian to Boardwalk. Kardashian bought Christian's album from the estate, and it is currently owned by YMC Records.

Bogart died of cancer in mid-1982 and the label closed down a year later. The Boardwalk catalog was purchased by Tom Ficara from W. Jersey Bank, which held the mortgage to the titles prior to the Boardwalk bankruptcy.

Boardwalk Records was relaunched as part of The Boardwalk Entertainment Group in 2010 by Neil Bogart's sons, Evan Kidd Bogart and Timothy Bogart, and their partner, Gary A. Randall. Boardwalk's current roster includes ZZ Ward, Wallpaper., and Nova Rockafeller In October 2019, Boardwalk sold the Ricky Reed catalogue to Anthem Entertainment.

== See also ==
- List of record labels
