= Kenny Laguna =

American songwriter and record producer

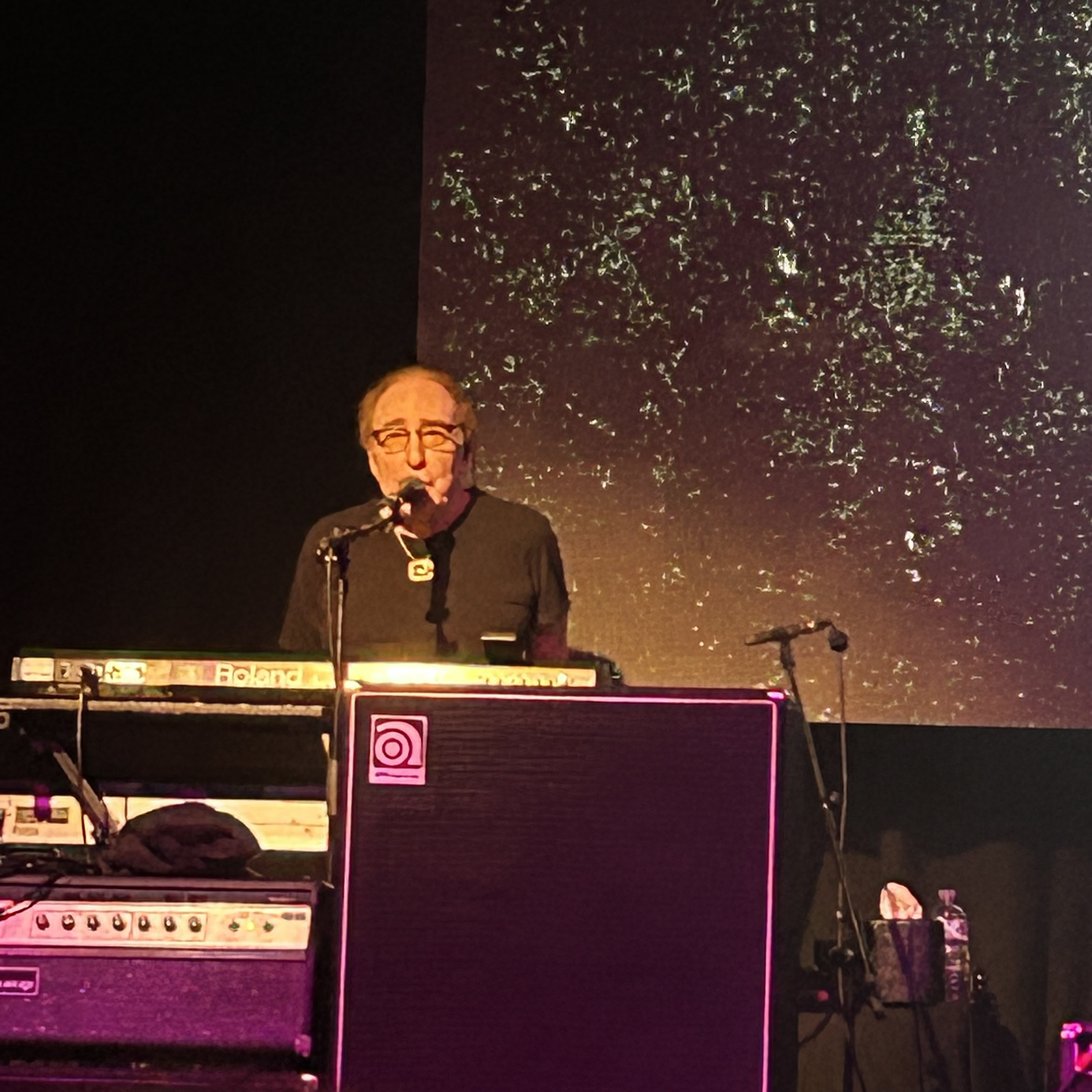
- Laguna performing with Joan Jett and the Blackhearts at the Manchester Academy, 2026

Background information
- Born: Kenneth Benjamin Laguna; January 30, 1954 (age 72); Greenwich Village, New York City, New York, U.S.
- Genres: Rock; hard rock; punk rock
- Occupations: Songwriter; record producer
- Member of: Joan Jett and the Blackhearts

Kenneth Benjamin Laguna is an American songwriter, record producer, and musician, best known for his work with rock singer Joan Jett.

== Biography ==
Laguna was born in Greenwich Village, New York City, United States, and started playing piano at high school dances from the age of twelve. In the late 1960s, he worked as a songwriter and producer with Super K Productions, established at Buddah Records by producers Jerry Kasenetz and Jeffry Katz, writing songs for such acts as Tony Orlando, The Ohio Express and The Lemon Pipers, often in association with writers Bo Gentry, Bobby Bloom and Ritchie Cordell. Laguna played keyboards for a time with Tommy James and the Shondells, and played on their 1968 hit single "Mony Mony"; he also played keyboards on the second Ohio Express album, Yummy Yummy. Some other credits that Laguna can be seen on include playing on and singing background vocals for "Simon Says", "Goody Goody Gumdrops", "Indian Giver", and most of the 1910 Fruitgum Company's record 1 2 3 Red Light, playing on "Gimme Gimme Good Lovin" by the Crazy Elephant, The Lemon Pipers' "Green Tambourine", as well as "This Magic Moment" and "Walkin' in the Rain" by Jay and the Americans.

One of his most successful writing credits is the tune "Groovin' With Mr. Bloe", originally a throwaway B-side for Tony Orlando's group Wind. The tune was covered in the UK by studio musicians calling themselves Mr. Bloe, and reached No. 2 on the UK singles chart in 1970. The original version was reissued in 1970 with "Are You Nuts?" on the B-side, and credited to Cool Heat charted in the U.S. peaking at No. 89 on the Billboard Hot 100. Laguna also worked on the soundtrack of the Andy Warhol film Lonesome Cowboys, and worked as a producer in Los Angeles with singers Darlene Love and Bill Medley, formerly of The Righteous Brothers. He played or sang on more than 50 Billboard Top 40 hits by 1972.

In the mid-1970s, he worked for a time in Britain, and produced a series of albums with the Steve Gibbons Band, as well as their UK hit single "Tulane", a cover of a Chuck Berry song. He also worked in Los Angeles, as a writer and producer for Beserkley Records, on songs by and for Jonathan Richman, Greg Kihn, Earth Quake and others. Producer credits with Jonathan Richman and the Modern Lovers include "Buzz, Buzz, Buzz" and "Abdul and Cleopatra". With Earth Quake and label boss Matthew "King" Kaufman, he recorded a version of Led Zeppelin's "Stairway to Heaven", rewritten with the lyrics to the theme song of the television show Gilligan's Island. The record was issued as a single, by Little Roger and the Goosebumps, but the label was threatened with legal action by Led Zeppelin's lawyers and copies were destroyed. It was reissued in 2000 on the compilation CD Laguna Tunes.

Laguna met, and began working with, Joan Jett, shortly after the break-up of The Runaways in 1979. Working with Cordell and others, he won her a solo record deal and co-produced her solo albums including Bad Reputation (1980), and I Love Rock 'n' Roll (1981). He established Blackheart Records with Jett in the early 1980s. Journalist Jonathan Gross described Laguna as "Jett's surrogate father/brother/manager/mentor/producer/schlepper/bagman, etc." In 1982 he also produced English band Bow Wow Wow's hit version of "I Want Candy". He has continued to work with Joan Jett, as performer, producer and manager, on her later albums and tours, and acted as executive producer on the 2010 film The Runaways, about Jett's earlier band.

On April 18, 2015, Laguna, along with Joan Jett and the Blackhearts, was inducted into the Rock and Roll Hall of Fame.
