= The Best of Tommy James and The Shondells =

Compilation album by Tommy James and the Shondells
- Released: December 1969
- Genre: Pop rock
- Length: 32:22
- Label: Roulette

Tommy James and the Shondells chronology
Cellophane Symphony (1969)	The Best of Tommy James and The Shondells (1969)	Travelin' (1970)

Singles from The Best of Tommy James and The Shondells
- 1. "Ball of Fire" Released: 1969

Professional ratings
Review scores
Source	Rating
AllMusic	4.5/5 stars

The Best of Tommy James and The Shondells is the second compilation album by American rock band Tommy James and the Shondells and was released in 1969. It reached No. 21 on the Billboard Top LPs chart.

One single was released from the album, "Ball of Fire", which reached No. 19 on the Billboard Hot 100.

== Track listing ==
No.	Title	Writer	Length
1.	"Ball of Fire"	Tommy James, Paul Naumann, Bruce Sudano, Mike Vale, Woody Wilson	2:53
2.	"Crystal Blue Persuasion"	Eddie Gray, Mike Vale, Tommy James	4:01
3.	"Mony, Mony"	Tommy James, Bo Gentry, Ritchie Cordell, Bobby Bloom	2:52
4.	"(Baby, Baby) I Can't Take It No More"	Ritchie Cordell, Tommy James	2:17
5.	"Hanky Panky"	Ellie Greenwich, Jeff Barry	2:59
6.	"Crimson and Clover (long album version)"	Peter Lucia, Tommy James	5:26
7.	"Sweet Cherry Wine"	Richie Grasso, Tommy James	3:57
8.	"Sugar on Sunday"	Mike Vale, Tommy James	3:19
9.	"Mirage"	Ritchie Cordell	2:30
10.	"I Think We're Alone Now"	Ritchie Cordell	2:08

== Personnel ==
- Vocals: Tommy James
- Guitar: Eddie Gray
- Bass: Mike Vale
- Organ: Ronnie Rosman
- Drums: Peter Lucia

== Charts ==
Chart (1969)	Peak position
US Billboard Top LPs	21

Singles

Year	Single	Chart	Position
1969	"Ball of Fire"	Billboard Hot 100	19
