= Draggin' the Line =

Single by Tommy James

Single by Tommy James

from the album Christian of the World
- A-side: "Church Street Soul Revival" (original)
- B-side: "Bits & Pieces" (reissue)
- Released: June 1971
- Recorded: 1971
- Genre: Pop rock; psychedelic rock
- Length: 2:45
- Label: Roulette Records
- Songwriters: Tommy James, Bob King
- Producers: Tommy James, Bob King

Tommy James singles chronology
"Adrienne" (1971)	"Draggin' the Line" (1971)	"I'm Comin' Home" (1971)

Alternative cover
- Original vinyl single for "Draggin' the Line"

"Draggin' the Line" is a hit song by American rock musician Tommy James, who went solo after the Shondells disbanded in 1970. It was first released as the B side of "Church Street Soul Revival" in 1970. The song was judged to have some hit potential so they went back in the studio and added horns to the master and re-released it as an A side single in 1971. It was included on his second album, Christian of the World, in 1971 on the Roulette Records label. The song was James' biggest hit as a solo artist selling more than a million copies, and appears as the fifth track on James' 1991 retrospective album The Solo Years (1970-81) released by Rhino.

== History and interpretation ==
"Draggin' the Line" was the biggest hit and only US top 10 hit of Tommy James' solo career. Written and produced by him and Bob King, the song reached the top 40 on the U.S.'s Billboard Hot 100 chart on June 26, 1971, climbed to a peak of #4 for the week of August 7, 1971, and remained in the top 40 rankings for 11 weeks total. The song reached even higher in Cashbox magazine's competing jukebox singles charts, attaining the #2 spot for the week of August 9, 1971. "Draggin' the Line" was ranked at #54 overall for hot songs of 1971 by U.S. music industry pillar Billboard magazine.

"Draggin' the Line" features a notable bassline as the main sound. It has been described as a "lazy psychedelic shuffle whose hypnotic feel perfectly expressed its title." Asked about the meaning of the title in a 2009 interview, Tommy James said: "'Draggin' the Line' just meant working every day. Nothing really very mysterious about it." However, it has been falsely speculated that the song's title and lyrics refer to cocaine use, citing the title, the lyrics, Tommy James' documented drug use, and because another Tommy James and the Shondells song, "Crystal Blue Persuasion", has been previously associated with the use of speed, the song having been described in 1979 by noted music critic Dave Marsh as "a transparent allegory" about James' involvement with amphetamines. In addition, it has been widely accepted that the song could more specifically refer to the tedious job of setting up power lines in the early 1950s and 1960s. This view has gained a large amount of support, especially since the lyrics are commonly interchanged with "Checkin' the line".

== Media appearances ==
"Draggin' the Line" has made many media appearances. Among others, in a cover by Beat Goes Bang in the 1991 film Don't Tell Mom the Babysitter's Dead; as the opener in a 1999 Canadian film New Waterford Girl; in a cover by R.E.M. in 1999 for the Austin Powers: The Spy Who Shagged Me soundtrack; in Inside Deep Throat, a 2005 documentary about the 1972 pornographic film Deep Throat; is heard in the sombre 2006 football drama We are Marshall, in the My Name is Earl episode, "Robbed a Stoner Blind", in CBS's crime drama Cold Case (episode 54), and was featured in "Anthem," a familiar Mitsubishi commercial that debuted in October 2004. The commercial shows a long line of cars and sport utility vehicles cruising past Mitsubishi mechanics all dressed in red coveralls. A significant portion of the song is heard in the 2019 film Finding Steve McQueen. It is used as the opening song in the 2023 Jennifer Lawrence film, No Hard Feelings.

== Legacy ==
In 2000, Tommy James and the Shondells reprised twelve of their most famous songs at the well known Greenwich Village nightclub, The Bitter End. Although technically a solo hit for Tommy James, the band performed "Draggin' the Line". Other hits featured included "Crimson & Clover", "I Think We're Alone Now", "Hanky Panky", "Mony Mony", and "Crystal Blue Persuasion". The live set was filmed and made into the 2000 movie, Tommy James & the Shondells: Live! At the Bitter End.

A looping sample of the main rhythm section of "Draggin' the Line" is used as the background for Book Of Love's "Turn the World", from their 1991 album Candy Carol. The song also features brief snippets (recreated) of "The Lion Sleeps Tonight".

In 1998 The Roulette Story was released featuring "Draggin' the Line" as one of 84 tracks celebrating Roulette Records' notable 20-year music history (the label had closed its doors in 1977). In various versions, "Draggin' the Line" has appeared on at least 41 studio albums, including covers by AC-Rock, Rusty Bryant, Crosswind Band, Barry Hay, R.E.M., The Squirrels, Vintage Buzz, The Wild Ones and Steve Wynn.

== Chart performance ==
=== Weekly charts ===
Chart (1971)	Peak position
Australia KMR	20
Canada RPM Top Singles	2
New Zealand (Listener)	19
US Billboard Hot 100	4
US Billboard Adult Contemporary	6
US Cash Box Top 100	2

=== Year-end charts ===
Chart (1971)	Rank
Australia	169
Canada	32
U.S. Billboard Hot 100	54
U.S. Cash Box	12
