= Do Something to Me =

Single by Tommy James and the Shondells

from the album Crimson & Clover
- B-side: "Gingerbread Man"
- Released: October 1968
- Genre: Power pop
- Length: 2:28
- Label: Roulette
- Songwriters: Jimmy Calvert, Norman Marzano, Paul Naumann
- Producer: Tommy James

Tommy James and the Shondells singles chronology
"Somebody Cares" (1968)	"Do Something to Me" (1968)	"Crimson and Clover" (1968)

"Do Something to Me" is a song written by Jimmy Calvert, Norman Marzano, and Paul Naumann and was recorded by Tommy James and the Shondells for their 1968 album, Crimson & Clover.

== Reception ==
"Do Something to Me" reached #38 on the Billboard Hot 100 in 1968. The song also reached #16 in Canada.

== Cover versions ==
- ? and the Mysterians released the original version in August 1967 that reached #110 on the US chart. It was the last single for the band on the Cameo-Parkway Records label. Jimmy Wisner arranged the music for the song.
- The Pooh Sticks released a version of the song in 1988 on their album, Orgasm.
