= Travelin' (Tommy James and the Shondells album) =

Studio album by Tommy James and the Shondells
- Released: March 1970
- Genre: Hard rock, blues rock
- Length: 33:53
- Label: Roulette
- Producer: Bob King, Tommy James

Tommy James and the Shondells chronology
The Best of Tommy James and The Shondells (1969)	Travelin' (1970)	Anthology (1989)

Singles from Travelin'
- 1. "She" Released: November 1969; 2. "Gotta Get Back to You" Released: 1970

Professional ratings
Review scores
Source	Rating
Allmusic	3/5 stars

Travelin' is the eighth and final studio album by the American pop rock band Tommy James and the Shondells released in 1970.

The album had two singles that charted. "She" went to #23 on the Billboard Hot 100 in January 1970. "Gotta Get Back to You" reached #45 on the chart in March 1970. The album landed on the Billboard 200, reaching #91.

The album was the final album released by the band on Roulette Records.

== Track listing ==
All songs written and composed by Tommy James and Bob King except where noted.

No.	Title	Writer	Length
1.	"Bloody Water"		4:44
2.	"Red Rover"		2:40
3.	"Candy Maker"		3:35
4.	"She"	Ritchie Cordell, Tommy James, Bob King, Mike Vale	2:03
5.	"Talkin' & Signifyin'"		2:43
6.	"Travelin'"	Eddie Gray, Tommy James, Peter Lucia, Ronnie Rosman, Mike Vale	3:45
7.	"Gotta Get Back to You"		3:07
8.	"Early in the Mornin'"	Tommy James, Bob King, Mike Vale	3:15
9.	"Moses & Me"		2:50
10.	"Kelly Told Anne"		3:50

== Credits ==
- Acoustic and Electric Guitar: Eddie Gray
- Acoustic and Electric Guitar and Keyboards: Tommy James
- Keyboards: Ron Rosman
- Bass: Mike Vale
- Drums and Percussion: Peter Lucia
- Producer: Bob King, Tommy James
- Arranger: Bob King, Jimmy Wisner
- Engineer: Bruce Staples

== Charts ==
Album

Year	Chart	Peak Position
1970	Billboard 200	91

Singles

Year	Single	Chart	Position
1969	"She"	Billboard Hot 100	23
1970	"Gotta Get Back to You"	Billboard Hot 100	45
