= Gettin' Together =

Gettin' Together may refer to:

- Gettin' Together (Art Pepper album), 1960
- Gettin' Together (Paul Gonsalves album), 1960
- Gettin' Together (Tommy James and the Shondells album), 1967
  - "Gettin' Together" (song), a 1967 song by Tommy James and the Shondells

== See also ==
- Getting Together, an American TV series
