= I'm Alive (Tommy James and the Shondells song) =

1969 single by Johnny Thunder

Single by Johnny Thunder
- B-side: "Verbal Expressions of T.V."
- Released: 1969
- Genre: Blues rock, R&B, psychedelic rock
- Length: 2:30
- Label: Calia
- Songwriters: Tommy James, Peter Lucia

"I'm Alive" is a song written by Tommy James, who released it with his band the Shondells as part of their album Crimson & Clover in 1968. It later appeared as a B-side for their single "Crystal Blue Persuasion".

Soul singer Johnny Thunder issued his own version in 1969. Thunder's recording of "I'm Alive" was a "raucous" rock single, featuring "Verbal Expressions of T.V." as its B-side. Bob Dylan, who had heard "I'm Alive" on the radio, was asked by Rolling Stone's Jann Wenner in 1969 if he was impressed by anything in the rock music scene and pointed to the song: "Never heard it either, huh? Well, I can't believe it. Everyone I've talked to, I've asked them if they've heard that record. It was one of the most powerful records I've ever heard. It's called 'I'm Alive.' By Johnny Thunder. Well, it was that sentiment, truly expressed. That's the most I can say ... if you heard the record, you'd know what I mean."

Thunder's version of "I'm Alive" was later used by Samsung in their advertisement of the Galaxy S6 Edge in 2015. It was also used in the soundtrack for the 2018 film American Animals and in a 2025 Lincoln vehicle commercial.

== Don Fardon version ==
"I'm Alive"

Single by Don Fardon
- B-side: "Keep on Loving Me"
- Released: August 1969
- Genre: Psychedelic soul
- Length: 2:26; 3:24 (extended version)
- Label: Young Blood
- Songwriters: Tommy James, Peter Lucia
- Producer: Miki Dallon

British singer Don Fardon released a cover as a single also in 1969. His recording has been featured in a UK television advertisement for Five Alive fruit drinks, and a Dutch Vodafone commercial.

On the back of the success of the latter, "I'm Alive" was reissued in the Netherlands and in March 2011 it reached the Top 20 of the Dutch singles chart. Don Fardon's version has been remixed and released as a single by English DJ Ashley Beedle.

== Other versions ==
In 1975, Swedish band Blue Swede recorded a mash-up which combined verses of "I'm Alive" with others borrowed from "Hush", by Deep Purple.
The song was also recorded by Tom Jones, appearing on his 2008 album 24 Hours.

Canadian garage-punk band, UIC, from Toronto, Ontario, recorded their version of "I'm Alive" on their 1986 album Our Garage.
