= Cellophane Symphony =

Studio album by Tommy James and the Shondells
- Released: October 1969
- Genre: Psychedelic pop; bubblegum pop
- Length: 42:21
- Label: Roulette; Rhino
- Producer: Tommy James

Tommy James and the Shondells chronology
| Crimson & Clover (1968) | Cellophane Symphony (1969) | The Best of Tommy James and The Shondells (1969) |

Singles from Cellophane Symphony
- 1. "Sweet Cherry Wine" Released: April 4, 1969 (UK)

Cellophane Symphony is the seventh studio album by American rock band Tommy James and the Shondells, released in October 1969 through Roulette Records. The album was re-issued on CD in 2014 by Rhino Records.

Professional ratings
Review scores
| Source | Rating |
|---|---|
| Allmusic | 4/5 stars |

== Track listing ==
All tracks are written by Tommy James and Ritchie Cordell, except where noted.

Side one
| No. | Title | Writer(s) | Length |
|---|---|---|---|
| 1. | "Cellophane Symphony" | Tommy James and the Shondells | 9:40 |
| 2. | "Makin' Good Time" | | 2:38 |
| 3. | "Evergreen" | | 2:08 |
| 4. | "Sweet Cherry Wine" | Richard Grasso; James | 4:30 |
| 5. | "Papa Rolled His Own" | Pete Lucia; James | 1:50 |
| Total length: | | | 20:46 |

Side two
| No. | Title | Writer(s) | Length |
|---|---|---|---|
| 1. | "Changes" | Lucia; James | 5:35 |
| 2. | "Loved One" | Mike Vale; James | 3:41 |
| 3. | "I Know Who I Am" | | 3:54 |
| 4. | "The Love of a Woman" | | 4:30 |
| 5. | "On Behalf of the Entire Staff & Management" | | 3:55 |
| Total length: | | | 21:35 |

== Personnel ==
Tommy James and the Shondells

- Tommy James – lead vocals, rhythm guitar, keyboards
- Eddie Gray – lead guitar, backing vocals
- Ronnie Rosman – keyboards, backing vocals
- Mike Vale – bass guitar, backing vocals
- Pete Lucia – drums, percussion, backing vocals

Additional personnel

- Bruce Staple – engineer
- Carol Geyer – sleeve design

== Charts ==
| Chart (1969) | Peak position |
|---|---|
| US Billboard 200 | 141 |
