= She (Tommy James and the Shondells song) =

Single by Tommy James and the Shondells

from the album Travelin'
- B-side: "Loved One"
- Released: November 1969
- Genre: Rock
- Length: 2:03
- Label: Roulette
- Songwriters: Tommy James, Mike Vale, Jeffry Katz, Jerry Kasenetz, Ritchie Cordell
- Producers: Tommy James, Bob King

Tommy James and the Shondells singles chronology
"Ball of Fire" (1969)	"She" (1969)	"Gotta Get Back to You" (1970)

"She" is a song recorded by Tommy James and the Shondells and released as a single in November 1969; it was also included on the band's 1970 album, Travelin'. The song reached No. 23 on the Billboard Hot 100 on January 24, 1970. The song also reached No. 15 in Canada. It was the 13th and final top 40 hit for the band, although James went on to have three more top 40 hits as a solo artist.

== Background ==
Early pressings of the 45 credited the writing to Tommy James, Mike Vale, and Robert King; at some point in the single's hit run this was amended to Tommy James, Mike Vale, Jeffry Katz, Jerry Kasenetz, and Ritchie Cordell, which is how it would be credited on Travelin' and on subsequent compilations.

== Chart performance ==
Chart (1969–70)	Peak position
Canada	15
US Billboard Hot 100	23
