= Hanky Panky (Tommy James and the Shondells album) =

Studio album by Tommy James and the Shondells
- Released: May 1966
- Genre: Pop rock; garage rock
- Length: 30:40
- Label: Roulette
- Producer: Bob Mack, Henry Glover

Tommy James and the Shondells chronology
| Hanky Panky (1966) | It's Only Love (1966) |

Singles from Hanky Panky
- 1. "Hanky Panky" Released: May 1966; 2. "Say I Am (What I Am)" Released: 1966

Professional ratings
Review scores
| Source | Rating |
|---|---|
| Allmusic | 3/5 stars |

Hanky Panky is the debut studio album of American rock band Tommy James and the Shondells and was released in 1966. It reached #46 on the Billboard 200. The album had two singles that charted. the title track reached #1 on the Billboard Hot 100 and "Say I Am (What I Am)" reached #21.

Other than a brief impromptu performance together onstage in Pittsburgh several days earlier, after which James invited the band to serve as his new Shondells, the first time the entire band worked together was when they went into the studio to record this album.

== Track listing ==
Side A
| No. | Title | Writer | Length |
|---|---|---|---|
| 1. | "Hanky Panky" | Jeff Barry, Ellie Greenwich | 2:59 |
| 2. | "I'll Go Crazy" | James Brown | 2:18 |
| 3. | "I'm So Proud" | Curtis Mayfield | 3:31 |
| 4. | "The Lover" | George Magura, Mike Vale | 2:05 |
| 5. | "Love Makes the World Go Round" | Deon Jackson | 2:25 |
| 6. | "Good Lovin'" | Rudy Clark, Arthur Resnick | 2:20 |

Side B
| No. | Title | Writer | Length |
|---|---|---|---|
| 7. | "Say I Am (What I Am)" | Barbara Tomsco, George Tomsco | 2:37 |
| 8. | "Cleo's Mood" | Junior Walker, William Kanter Woods | 2:20 |
| 9. | "Don't Throw Our Love Away" | Tommy James & the Shondells | 2:40 |
| 10. | "Shake a Tail Feather" | Otha Hayes, Verlie Rice, Andre Williams | 2:37 |
| 11. | "Soul Searchin' Baby" | Tommy James & the Shondells | 2:35 |
| 12. | "Lots of Pretty Girls" | Paul Leka, Paul Rush | 2:13 |
| Total length: | | | 30:40 |

== Credits ==
- Tommy James – lead vocals
- Joseph Kessler – guitar; backing vocals
- George Magura – bass guitar, piano, tenor saxophone, vibraphone
- Vincent Pietropaoli – clarinet, drums, saxophone
- Ron Rosman – organ, piano; lead vocals on "The Lover"
- Mike Vale – bass guitar; backing vocals, lead vocals on "I'm So Proud" and "Love Makes The World Go Round"

Bob Mack is the producer.

== Charts ==
Album

| Year | Chart | Peak Position |
|---|---|---|
| 1966 | Billboard 200 | 46 |

Singles

| Year | Single | Chart | Position |
|---|---|---|---|
| 1966 | "Hanky Panky" | Billboard Hot 100 | 1 |
| 1966 | "Hanky Panky" | R&B | 39 |
| 1966 | "Hanky Panky" | UK Singles Chart | 38 |
| 1966 | "Say I Am (What I Am)" | Billboard Hot 100 | 21 |
