= I'm Comin' Home =

Single by Tommy James

from the album Christian of the World
- B-side: "Sing, Sing, Sing"
- Released: September 1971
- Genre: Pop rock
- Length: 2:03
- Label: Roulette Records 8238
- Songwriters: Tommy James, Bob King
- Producers: Tommy James, Bob King

Tommy James singles chronology
"Draggin' the Line" (1971)	"I'm Comin' Home" (1971)	"Nothing to Hide" (1971)

"I'm Comin' Home" is a song written by Tommy James and Bob King and performed by James featuring The Stephentown Singers. The song was the follow-up single after James' hit "Draggin' the Line". It reached No. 19 in Canada and No. 40 on the Billboard Hot 100 in 1971. It was featured on his 1971 album, Christian of the World.

The song was produced by James and King and arranged by Jimmy Wisner.
