= Crimson & Clover (album) =

Studio album by Tommy James and the Shondells
- Released: December 1968
- Recorded: 1968
- Genre: Psychedelic; pop; bubblegum
- Length: 32:45
- Label: Roulette
- Producer: Tommy James and the Shondells

Tommy James and the Shondells chronology
Mony Mony (1968)	Crimson & Clover (1968)	Cellophane Symphony (1969)

Singles from Crimson & Clover
- 1. "Do Something to Me" Released: October 1968; 2. "Crimson and Clover" Released: November 1968; 3. "Crystal Blue Persuasion" Released: June 1969

Professional ratings
Review scores
Source	Rating
AllMusic	4/5 stars

Crimson & Clover is the sixth studio album by American rock band Tommy James and the Shondells. It features the #1 hit, its title track as well as the #2 hit "Crystal Blue Persuasion". The album Crimson & Clover was released in December 1968 and reached a peak of #8 on the Billboard 200.

Based on suggestions from radio stations the group chose to create an extended five-and-a-half minute long version of the title song for the album. The first two verses were copied without lead vocals, and then overdubbed with guitar solos by Shondells guitarist Ed Gray using steel guitars and fuzz guitars, as well as an extended one-minute wah-wah pedal finish. During tape copying a slight speed error was inadvertently introduced. This resulted in a small drop in pitch during the new guitar solo sections, which went unfixed.

The group had toured with Vice President Hubert Humphrey during his 1968 presidential campaign. Humphrey showed his appreciation by writing the liner notes for the Crimson & Clover album.

== CD re-release ==
The version of Crimson and Clover on the 1991 "Crimson and Clover/Cellophane Symphony" CD is the same as the original album version; however, digital audio workstation software was used to fix the speed and pitch error made in 1968. The CD booklet states that "Crimson and Clover" is now as it was "meant to be heard," and that James is "very satisfied" with the reissue of the recordings in CD format.

== Track listing ==
No.	Title	Writer	Length
1.	"Crimson and Clover"	Tommy James, Peter Lucia	5:36
2.	"Kathleen McArthur"	Tommy James, Mike Vale	2:45
3.	"I'm a Tangerine"	Tommy James, Peter Lucia	3:38
4.	"Do Something to Me"	Jimmy Calvert, Norman Marzano, Paul Naumann	3:22
5.	"Crystal Blue Persuasion"	Eddie Gray, Tommy James, Mike Vale	4:02
6.	"Sugar on Sunday"	Tommy James, Mike Vale	3:26
7.	"Breakaway"	Tommy James, Mike Vale	2:48
8.	"Smokey Roads"	Tommy James	2:52
9.	"I'm Alive"	Tommy James, Peter Lucia	3:15
10.	"Crimson and Clover (reprise)"	Tommy James, Peter Lucia	1:03

== Personnel ==
Tommy James and the Shondells

- Tommy James – lead vocals and backing vocals, acoustic and electric rhythm guitar, piano
- Eddie Gray – lead guitars and backing vocals
- Ronnie Rosman – organ and backing vocals
- Mike Vale – bass and backing vocals
- Pete Lucia – drums, bongos, tambourine and backing vocals

Additional personnel

- Bruce Staple – engineer
- Carol Geyer – sleeve design
- Michael Thom – liner notes
- Ken Perry – engineer (CD remastering)
- Bill Inglot – engineer (CD remastering)

== Charts ==
Album

Year	Chart	Peak Position
1969	Billboard 200	8

Singles

Year	Single	Chart	Peak position
1968	"Do Something to Me"	Billboard Hot 100	38
1968	"Crimson and Clover"	Billboard Hot 100	1
1969	"Crystal Blue Persuasion"	Billboard Hot 100	2
1969	"Crystal Blue Persuasion"	Adult Contemporary; Chart	27
