= Say I Am (What I Am) =

Single by Tommy James and the Shondells

from the album Hanky Panky
- A-side: "Lots of Pretty Girls"
- Released: 1966
- Genre: Rock
- Length: 2:37
- Label: Roulette
- Songwriters: Barbara Tomsco, George Tomsco

Tommy James and the Shondells singles chronology
"Hanky Panky" (1966)	"Say I Am (What I Am)" (1966)	"It's Only Love" (1966)

"Say I Am (What I Am)" is a song written by Barbara and George Tomsco and was recorded by Tommy James and the Shondells for their 1966 album, Hanky Panky. The song reached No. 21 on the Billboard Hot 100 in 1966. In Canada it reached No. 12.
