= Tommy James and the Shondells =

American rock band

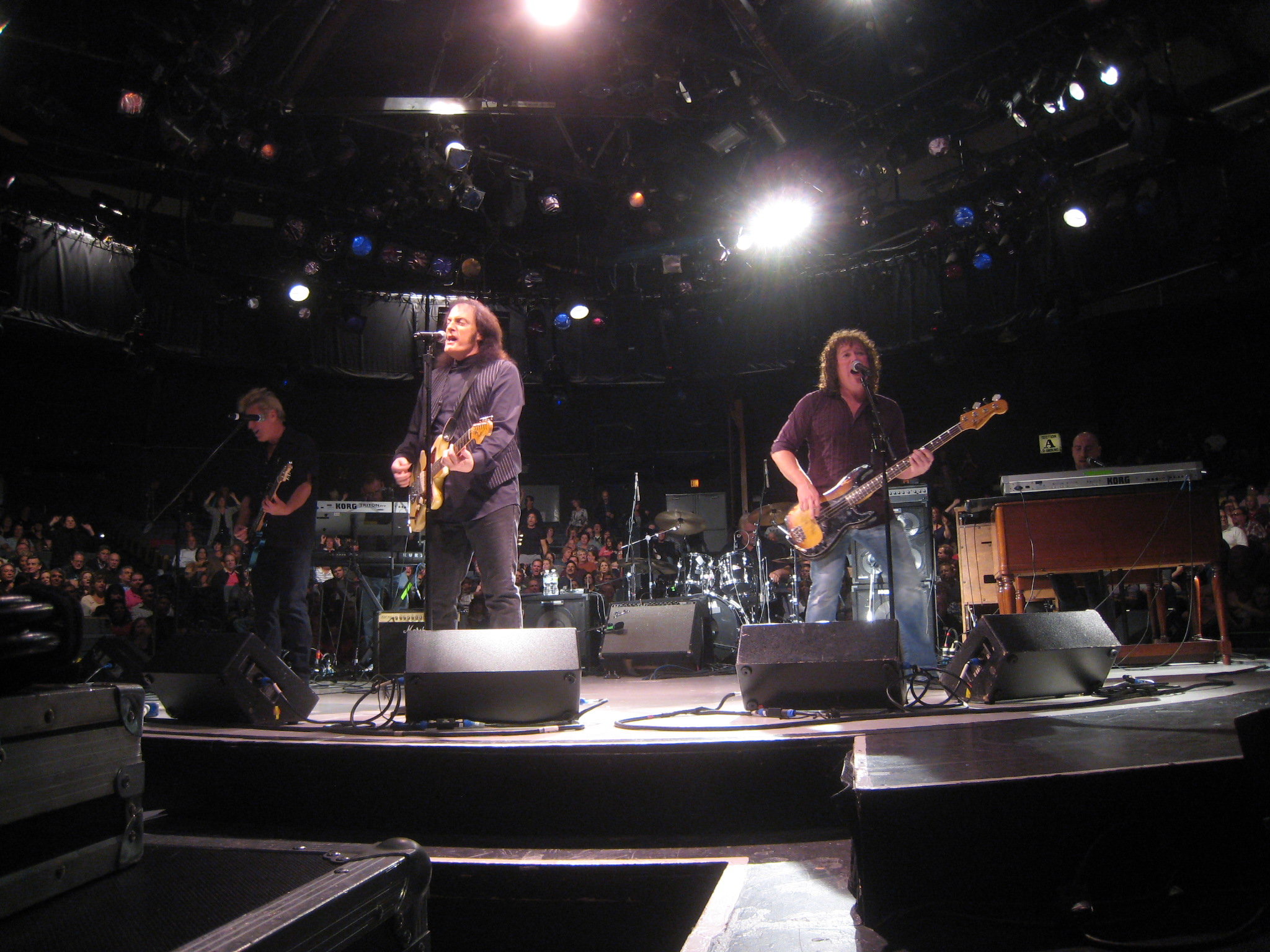
- Tommy James and the Shondells performing in 2010

Background information
- Also known as: The Shondells
- Origin: Niles, Michigan, U.S.
- Genres: Rock; bubblegum; psychedelic
- Years active: 1964–present
- Label: Roulette
- Spinoffs: Hog Heaven; The Crystal Blue Band
- Spinoff of: The Echoes; Tom and the Tornadoes
- Members: Tommy James; Johnny Golden; Glenn Wyka; Greg Smith; Mike DiMeo; Jonathn Ashe; Benny Harrison
- Past members: Bobby Guy; Gary Hess; Mike Vale; Ronnie Rosman; Joel Burcat; Eddie Gray; Peter Lucia Jr.; Joseph Kessler; Larry Wright; Larry Coverdale; Vincent Pietropaoli; James Payne; Phil Picciano; Mike Baird; Craig Villeneuve; George D. Magura; John E. Van Dyke; Kenneth "Fung Porter" King; Johnnie N. Hogg; David Santos; Ray van Straten; Don Ciccone; Lou Conte; Al Fritsch; Owen Yost; Lukas Peckford; Kasim Sulton; Bob Clancy
- Website: www.tommyjames.com

Tommy James and the Shondells is an American rock band formed in Niles, Michigan, in 1964. The band has had two No. 1 singles in the U.S.: "Hanky Panky" (1966), the band's only RIAA Certified Gold record, and "Crimson and Clover" (1968). The band also charted twelve other top 40 hits, including five in the Hot 100's Top 10: "I Think We're Alone Now" (1967), "Mirage" (1967), "Mony Mony" (1968), "Sweet Cherry Wine" (1969), and "Crystal Blue Persuasion" (1969).

== History ==
=== Origins ===
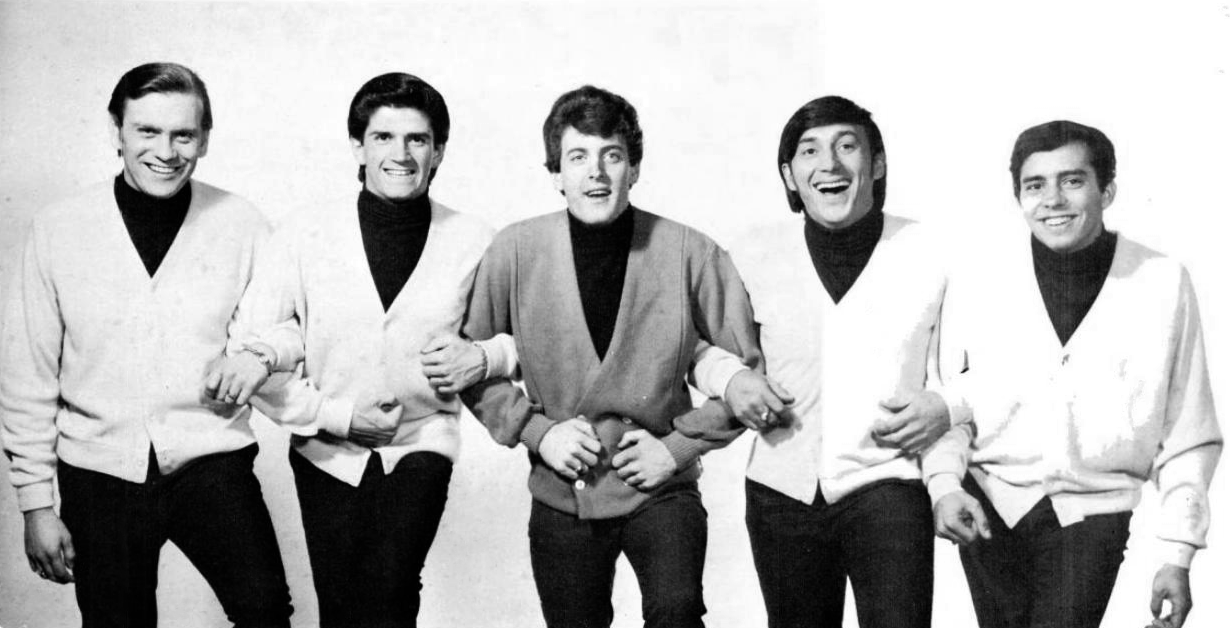
Tommy James and the Shondells in 1967. Left to right: Ron Rosman, Peter Lucia, Tommy James, Mike Vale and Eddie Gray

The band The Echoes formed in 1959 in Niles, Michigan, then evolved into Tom and the Tornadoes, with 12-year-old Tommy James (then known as Tommy Jackson) as lead singer. While attending Niles High School in Niles, Michigan, the group released its first single, "Long Pony Tail", in 1962.

In 1964, James renamed the band the Shondells because the name "sounded good" and in honor of nearby Fort Wayne's Troy Shondell, famous for his 1961 release "This Time". At this time, the band included Tommy James (vocals and guitar), Larry Coverdale (lead guitar), Larry Wright (bass), Craig Villeneuve (keyboards) and Jim Payne (drums). In February 1964 the band recorded the Jeff Barry–Ellie Greenwich song "Hanky Panky" (originally a B-side by the Raindrops). As James could often be found playing at Niles High School events, his popularity locally continued to grow. James' version of "Hanky Panky" sold respectably in Michigan, Indiana and Illinois, but Snap Records, the label under which "Hanky Panky" was originally released, had no national distribution. The band toured the eastern Midwest, but no other market took to the song. The single failed to chart nationally and the Shondells disbanded in 1965 after its members graduated from high school.

After first considering taking a job outside of music, James decided to form a new band, the Koachmen, with Shondells guitarist Larry Coverdale and members of a rival group called the Spinners (not the hit-making group from Detroit). The Koachmen played a circuit of clubs in the Midwest through the summer and fall of 1965, but returned to Niles in February 1966, after the gigs dried up, to plot their next move.

=== Hanky Panky ===
Meanwhile, in 1965, Pittsburgh dance promoter Bob Mack had unearthed the forgotten single "Hanky Panky", playing it at various dance parties, and radio stations there touted it as an "exclusive". Listener response encouraged regular play and demand soared. Bootleggers responded by printing 80,000 black market copies of the recording, which were sold in Pennsylvania stores.

James first learned of all of this activity in April 1966, after getting a telephone call from Pittsburgh disc jockey "Mad Mike" Metro(vich), who asked him to come and perform the song. James attempted to contact other members of the Shondells, but they had all moved away, joined the service or gotten married and left the music business altogether. There remains disagreement over the role of Metrovich in the recording. In his book, Me, The Mob and the Music, James credits Pittsburgh dance promoter Bob Mack and never mentions Metrovich.

In April 1966, James went by himself to make promotional appearances in Pittsburgh in nightclubs and on local television. Bob Mack made his dance club bands available to James for promotional appearances, but nothing seemed to fit until a guitarist from one of the bands took James to the Thunderbird Lounge in Greensburg, where he recruited a quintet that was playing there called the Raconteurs – Joe Kessler (guitar), Ron Rosman (keyboards), George Magura (saxophone and piano), Mike Vale (bass) and Vincent Pietropaoli (drums) – as the new Shondells. "I had no group, and I had to put one together really fast," recalled James. "I was in a Greensburg, PA club one night, and I walked up to a group that was playing that I thought was pretty good and asked them if they wanted to be the Shondells. They said yes, and off we went."

With a touring group to promote the single, James went to New York City, where he sold the master of "Hanky Panky" to Roulette Records, at which time he changed his last name to James. With national promotion, the single became a No. 1 hit in July 1966. He signed with Leonard Stogel and Associates for management. In 1967, Kessler and Pietropaoli were forced to leave after a dispute when planned monies were not remitted to them by Roulette, a label closely associated with organized crime, and whose head, Morris Levy, was the inspiration for the Herman "Hesh" Rabkin character on The Sopranos. They were replaced by Eddie Gray (guitar) and Peter Lucia (drums); Magura departed as well.

=== Tommy James and the Shondells ===
At first, Tommy James and "his" Shondells played straightforward rock and roll, but they soon became associated with the budding bubblegum music genre. James disputes this, saying that Super K Productions "bubblegum" producers Jerry Kasenetz and Jeffry Katz approached his record company (run by Morris Levy) looking for songwriting jobs. Levy spurned Kasenetz and Katz, so they went elsewhere and became successful with such bands as the 1910 Fruitgum Company. Bubblegum is generally traced to the success of the 1968 Fruitgum Company hit "Simon Says". Tommy rejects the "bubblegum" label for his music. In early 1967 songwriter Ritchie Cordell gave them the No. 4 hit "I Think We're Alone Now" and the No. 10 hit "Mirage". In 1968, James had a No. 3 hit with "Mony Mony". Co-written by James, Cordell, Cordell's writing partner Bo Gentry, and Bobby Bloom, "Mony Mony" reached No. 3 in the US and was a British No. 1 in 1968. The title was inspired by a flashing sign for Mutual of New York visible from James's apartment balcony in New York. He followed it with "Do Something to Me". The Crimson & Clover album marked the start of the band's psychedelic style.

The group toured with Vice President Hubert Humphrey during his 1968 presidential campaign, for which Humphrey showed his appreciation by writing the liner notes for their next album Crimson & Clover, which was released in December 1968. From late 1968, the group began writing their own songs, with James and Lucia penning the psychedelic-tinged classic "Crimson and Clover", which was recorded and mixed by Bruce Staple, with James tackling vocal duties and playing many of the instruments himself, and featured the creative use of studio effects such as delay and tremolo.

Further hits included "Sweet Cherry Wine", "Crystal Blue Persuasion", and "Ball of Fire", all from 1969. They also produced "Sugar on Sunday", later covered by the Clique. As the band embraced the sounds of psychedelia, they were invited to perform at Woodstock, but declined.

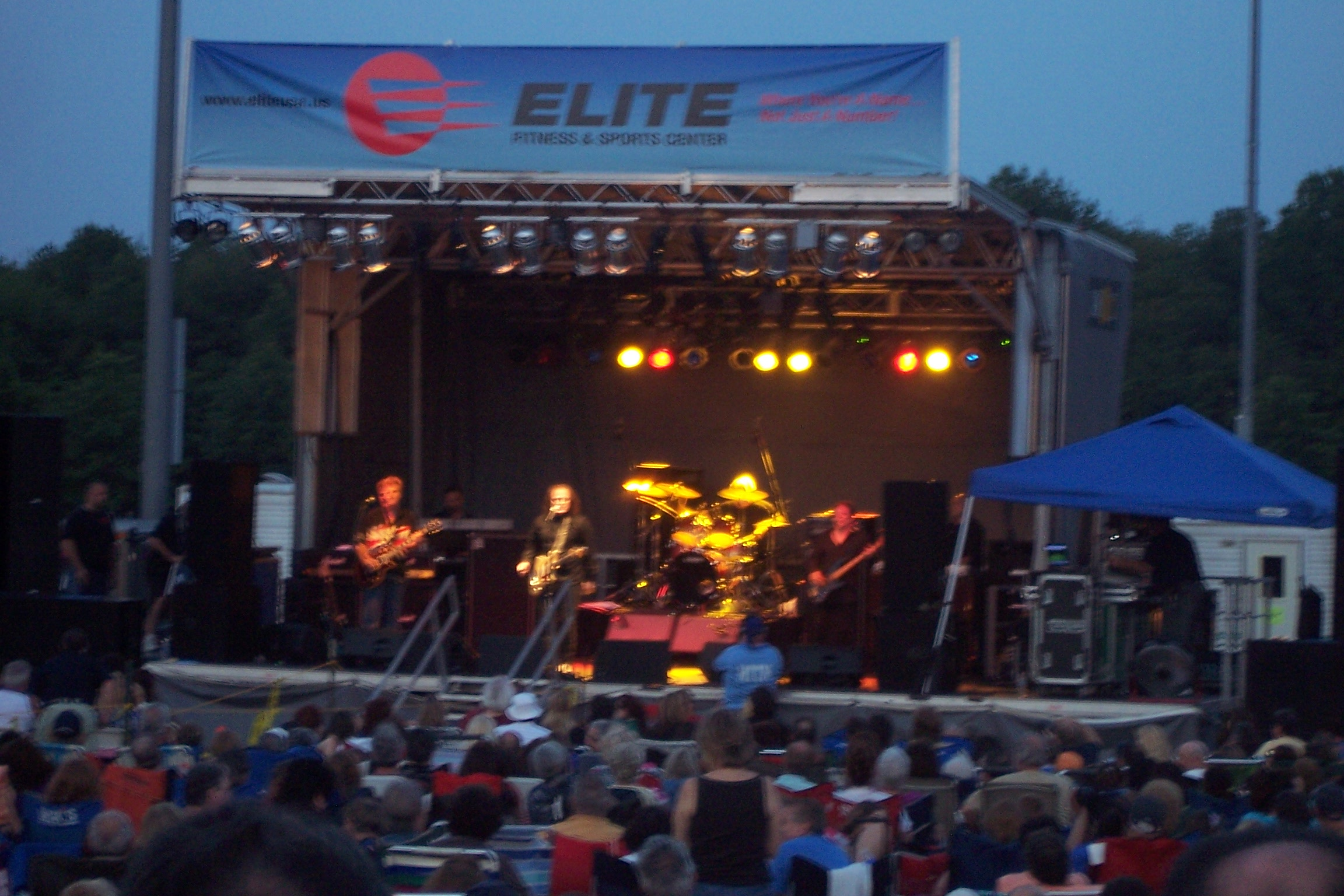
The 2000s edition of Tommy James and the Shondells plays a 2010 free outdoor concert in Manalapan Township, New Jersey

The group continued until 1970.

=== Hog Heaven ===
At a concert in Birmingham, Alabama, in March 1970, an exhausted James collapsed after coming off stage from a reaction to drugs and was pronounced dead. He was not dead, however, and decided to move to the country to rest and recuperate, and left the band. His four bandmates carried on for a short while under the name Hog Heaven, recording two albums (one "self-titled" on Roulette Records in March 1971 and the second recorded in 1971, but unreleased until 2008), and landing one Hot 100 hit, "Happy", at number 98, but disbanded soon afterwards.

In a 1970 side project, James wrote and produced the No. 7 hit single "Tighter, Tighter" for the group Alive N Kickin'. James launched a solo career in 1970 that yielded two notable hits over a 10-year span, "Draggin' the Line" (1971) and "Three Times in Love" (1980).

=== Covers by other artists ===
During the 1980s, the group's songbook produced major hits for three other artists: Joan Jett & The Blackhearts' version of "Crimson and Clover" (US No. 7 in 1982), Tiffany's "I Think We're Alone Now" and Billy Idol's "Mony Mony" (back-to-back US/Canada No. 1 singles in November 1987). Other Shondells covers have been performed by acts as disparate as psychobilly ravers the Cramps, new wave singer Lene Lovich, country music veteran Dolly Parton, and the Boston Pops orchestra.

=== 1980s and later ===
In the mid-1980s, Tommy James began touring in oldies packages with other acts from the 1960s sometimes billed as Tommy James & the Shondells, although he is the group's only original member. A Greenwich Village nightclub appearance was filmed and released as Tommy James & the Shondells: Live! At The Bitter End.

On January 6, 1987, original drummer Peter P. Lucia Jr. died of a heart attack while playing golf at the age of 39.

In 2008, "I'm Alive" was covered by Tom Jones and released on his 24 Hours album.

In 2009, James and the surviving Shondells, Gray, Vale and Rosman, reunited to record music for a soundtrack of a proposed film based on James's autobiography, Me, the Mob, and the Music, released in February 2010.

In March 2011, the Tommy James song "I'm Alive" (co-written with Peter Lucia) became a top-20 hit in the Netherlands for UK singer Don Fardon after his version had been used in a Vodafone commercial.

In 2012, "Crystal Blue Persuasion" was used in the eighth episode of Season 5 of Breaking Bad, "Gliding Over All", during a montage depicting the process involved to bring main character Walter White's methamphetamine operation and its signature blue crystal meth to an international level.

In 2015, Gray, Vale, and Rosman decided to reunite and form their new group, The Crystal Blue Band. They recruited their longtime friend and drummer Mike Wilps to replace the late Peter Lucia. That group disbanded in 2022.

Guitarist Eddie Gray died in October 2026, at the age of 78.

== Recognition ==
In 2008, Tommy James and The Shondells were inducted into the Michigan Rock and Roll Legends Hall of Fame.

== Discography ==
=== Studio albums ===
Year	Album	US	Record Label
1966	Hanky Panky	46	Roulette Records
1966	It's Only Love	—	Roulette Records
1967	I Think We're Alone Now	74	Roulette Records
1967	Gettin' Together	—	Roulette Records
1968	Mony Mony	193	Roulette Records
1969	Crimson & Clover	8	Roulette Records
1969	Cellophane Symphony	141	Roulette Records
1970	Travelin'	91	Roulette Records
"—" denotes releases that did not chart.

=== Compilation albums ===
Year	Album	US	Record Label
1968	Something Special! The Best of Tommy James and The Shondells	174	Roulette Records
1969	The Best of Tommy James and The Shondells	21	Roulette Records
1989	Anthology	—	Rhino Records
1993	The Very Best of Tommy James and the Shondells	—	Rhino Records
2002	The Essentials	—	Rhino Records
2006	The Definitive Pop Collection [2-CD]	—	Rhino Records
2008	40 Years: The Complete Singles Collection (1966-2006)	—	Aura Records
2021	Celebration: The Complete Roulette Recordings 1966-1973	—	Cherry Red Records / Grapefruit
"—" denotes releases that did not chart.

=== Singles ===
Tom and the Tornadoes

Year	Title	Record Label	B-side
1962	"Judy"	Northway Sound Records	"Long Pony Tail"

==== The Shondells ====
Year	Title	Record Label	B-side
1964	"Hanky Panky"	Snap Records	"Thunderbolt"
1966	"Hanky Panky"	Red Fox Records	"Thunderbolt"

Tommy James and the Shondells

Year	Title	Peak chart positions					Record Label	B-side From same album as A-side except where indicated	Album
Year	Title	US	US A/C	US R&B	CAN	UK	Record Label	B-side From same album as A-side except where indicated	Album
1966	"Hanky Panky"	1	—	39	1	38	Roulette Records	"Thunderbolt" (Non-LP track)	Hanky Panky
1966	"Say I Am (What I Am)"	21	—	—	12	—	Roulette Records	"Lots of Pretty Girls"	Hanky Panky
1966	"It's Only Love"	31	—	—	10	—	Roulette Records	"Ya! Ya!"	It's Only Love
1967	"I Think We're Alone Now"	4	—	—	6	—	Roulette Records	"Gone, Gone, Gone"	I Think We're Alone Now
1967	"Mirage"	10	—	—	2	—	Roulette Records	"Run, Run, Baby, Run"	I Think We're Alone Now
1967	"I Like the Way"	25	—	—	21	—	Roulette Records	"(Baby, Baby) I Can't Take It No More"	I Think We're Alone Now
1967	"Gettin' Together"	18	—	—	24	—	Roulette Records	"Real Girl"	Gettin' Together
1967	"Out of the Blue"	43	—	—	35	—	Roulette Records	"Love's Closin' in on Me"	Something Special! The Best of Tommy James & the Shondells
1968	"Get Out Now"	48	—	—	37	—	Roulette Records	"Wish It Were You"	Mony Mony
1968	"Mony Mony"	3	—	—	3	1	Roulette Records	"One Two Three and I Fell"	Mony Mony
1968	"Somebody Cares"	53	—	—	40	—	Roulette Records	"Do Unto Me"	Mony Mony
1968	"Do Something to Me"	38	—	—	16	—	Roulette Records	"Gingerbread Man" (from Mony Mony)	Crimson & Clover
1968	"Crimson and Clover"	1	—	—	1	—	Roulette Records	"Some Kind of Love" (from Mony Mony)	Crimson & Clover
1969	"Sweet Cherry Wine"	7	—	—	6	—	Roulette Records	"Breakaway" (from Crimson and Clover)	Cellophane Symphony
1969	"Crystal Blue Persuasion"	2	27	—	1	—	Roulette Records	"I'm Alive"	Crimson & Clover
1969	"Ball of Fire"	19	—	—	8	—	Roulette Records	"Makin' Good Time" (from Cellophane Symphony)	The Best of Tommy James and The Shondells
1969	"She"	23	—	—	15	—	Roulette Records	"Loved One" (from Cellophane Symphony)	Travelin'
1970	"Gotta Get Back to You"	45	—	—	16	—	Roulette Records	"Red Rover"	Travelin'
1970	"Come to Me"	47	—	—	46	—	Roulette Records	"Talkin' and Signifyin'" (from Travelin')	Tommy James
"—" denotes releases that did not chart or were not released in that territory.

==== Hog Heaven ====
Year	Title	Peak chart positions	Record Label	B-side
Year	Title	US	Record Label	B-side
1971	"Happy"	98	Roulette Records	"Prayer"
