= Ball of Fire (song) =

Single by Tommy James and the Shondells

from the album The Best of Tommy James and The Shondells
- B-side: "Makin' Good Time"
- Released: 1969
- Genre: Rock
- Length: 2:53
- Label: Roulette
- Songwriters: Tommy James, Paul Naumann, Bruce Sudano, Mike Vale, Woody Wilson
- Producer: Tommy James

Tommy James and the Shondells singles chronology
"Crystal Blue Persuasion" (1969)	"Ball of Fire" (1969)	"She" (1969)

"Ball of Fire" is a song recorded by Tommy James and the Shondells for their 1969 greatest hits album, The Best of Tommy James and The Shondells. The song reached #19 on The Billboard Hot 100 in 1969. The song also reached #8 in Canada.
