= Gotta Get Back to You =

Single by Tommy James and the Shondells

from the album Travelin'
- B-side: "Red Rover"
- Released: 1970
- Genre: Rock
- Length: 3:01
- Label: Roulette
- Songwriter(s): Tommy James, Bob King
- Producer(s): Tommy James, Bob King

Tommy James and the Shondells singles chronology
"She" (1969)	"Gotta Get Back to You" (1970)	"Come to Me" (1970)

"Gotta Get Back to You" is a song written by Tommy James and Bob King and recorded by Tommy James and the Shondells for their 1970 album, Travelin'. The song reached No. 45 on the Billboard Hot 100 in 1970. The song also reached No. 16 in Canada.
