= Happy (Hog Heaven song) =

1971 single by Hog Heaven

- Cover for the Germany print

Single by Hog Heaven

from the album Hog Heaven
- B-side: "Prayer"
- Released: 1971
- Genre: Progressive rock
- Length: 3:36 (single release); 6:53 (digital release)
- Label: Roulette
- Songwriter(s): Mike Vale; Peter Lucia

"Happy" is a progressive rock song by American group Hog Heaven from their self-titled debut studio album. It was written and produced by Mike Vale and Peter Lucia, and released by Roulette Records in 1971.

== Background and composition ==
After the lead artist of the band Tommy James and the Shondells, Tommy James, collapsed in a Birmingham, Alabama concert in March 1970 from a reaction to drugs, he recovered and left the band. The other members formed the short-lived project Hog Heaven the next year, recording one studio album and releasing another in 2008.

The original song is 3 1/2 minutes, while the digital release is nearly 7 minutes long. Both versions have a tempo of 120 beats per minute and are in D major. On the B-side is a song titled "Prayer".

The song is also featured on the 1974 album 20 Solid Gold Hits.

== Critical reception ==
"Given the brand of upbeat, radio-ready pop that had been Tommy James & the Shondells' stock in trade, it's a bit of a surprise that Hog Heaven is for the most part a solid country-rock set with some potent boogie rock thrown in, and that Gray shows off his skills on the pedal steel as often as he does on the six-string," writes Mark Deming of AllMusic.

A review of Hog Heaven's first LP and lead single appeared on the front cover of Billboard's March 13, 1971 issue.

Hog Heaven is a unique 'in tune' group as Vale and Lucia play and sing their own 'honest things' while 'seeking the cosmic energies.' With such new world sounds as Wilma Mae, Glass Room, Bumpin' Slapcar Mama, Prayer and Happy, It's obvious that Mike and Peter have created a very honest thing called Hog Heaven.

It was labeled as a "Billboard Pick" two weeks later and reviewed by another writer, who stated, "Hog Heaven explodes; this progressive rock group, an outgrowth of the old Shondells, targets today's movement of music specifically and heavily. 'Happy' is already getting solid airplay on progressive rock FM stations, but 'Prayers' and 'Wilma Mae' are standouts and could be hits. Great LP," while a third writer called the track a "blockbuster, funky beat rock item loaded with Top 40 and Hot 100 potential." (Note: Reviews are on pages 24 and 58 for citation 5.)

The song also became the only Hog Heaven song to reach the Billboard Hot 100, peaking at number 98, and charting for two weeks, following one week at No. 25 on the Bubbling Under Hot 100 chart.
