= Christian of the World =

Studio album by Tommy James
- Released: August 1971
- Genre: Pop rock
- Length: 36:34
- Label: Roulette 3001
- Producers: Bob King, Tommy James

Tommy James chronology
Tommy James (1970)	Christian of the World (1971)	My Head, My Bed, and My Red Guitar (1971)

Singles from Christian of the World
- 1. "Church Street Soul Revival" Released: 1970; 2. "Adrienne" Released: 1971; 3. "Draggin' the Line" Released: 1971; 4. "I'm Comin' Home" Released: 1971

Professional ratings
Review scores
Source	Rating
Allmusic	4.5/5 stars

Christian of the World is the second solo studio album by Tommy James and was released in 1971. It reached #131 on the Billboard 200.

Many of the songs were a more open exploration of the artist's Christian faith, something which he has said had informed a number of his earlier works, but with the religious elements more obscured to make them palatable for Top 40 radio.

The album had four singles that charted. The biggest hit was "Draggin' the Line" that reached #2 in Canada, #4 on the Billboard Hot 100, and #6 on the U.S. adult contemporary chart. "I'm Comin' Home" reached #19 in Canada and #40 in the U.S. "Church Street Soul Revival" reached #55 in Canada and #62 in the U.S. "Adrienne" reached #93 in the U.S.

== Track listing ==
All songs written and composed by Tommy James and Bob King except where noted.

=== Side 1 ===
1. "Christian of the World" - 2:45
2. "Rings and Things" (James) - 1:55
3. "I'm Comin' Home" - 2:03
4. "Sing, Sing, Sing" (James) - 3:05
5. "Draggin' the Line" - 2:45
6. "Sail a Happy Ship" - 3:15
7. "Light of Day" - 3:46

=== Side 2 ===
1. "Bits and Pieces" - 2:30
2. "I Believe in People" - 2:26
3. "Church Street Soul Revival" (Ritchie Cordell, James) - 3:15
4. "Another Hill to Climb" - 3:10
5. "Adrienne" - 2:40
6. "Silk, Satin, Carriage Waiting" - 2:49

== Personnel ==
- Background vocals: The Stephentown Singers
- Producer: Bob King, Tommy James
- Arranger: Jimmy Wisner
- Engineer: Bruce Staple
- Recorded at: Allegro Sound Studios

== Charts ==
Album

Year	Chart	Peak Position
1971	Billboard 200	131

Singles

Year	Single	Chart	Position
1970	"Church Street Soul Revival"	RPM	55
1970	"Church Street Soul Revival"	Billboard Hot 100	62
1971	"Adrienne"	Billboard Hot 100	93
1971	"Draggin' the Line"	RPM	2
1971	"Draggin' the Line"	Billboard Hot 100	4
1971	"Draggin' the Line"	U.S. AC chart	6
1971	"I'm Comin' Home"	RPM	19
1971	"I'm Comin' Home"	Billboard Hot 100	40
