= Gettin' Together (Tommy James and the Shondells album) =

Studio album by Tommy James and the Shondells
- Released: September 1967
- Recorded: Summer 1967
- Genres: Bubblegum pop; pop rock
- Length: 29:59
- Label: Roulette
- Producers: Bo Gentry and Ritchie Cordell

Tommy James and the Shondells chronology
I Think We're Alone Now (1967)	Gettin' Together (1967)	Mony Mony (1968)

Singles from Gettin' Together
- 1. "Gettin' Together" Released: August 1967

Gettin' Together is the fourth studio album by the American rock band Tommy James and the Shondells. It was released on Roulette Records in September 1967, the second of two albums released by the Shondells that year. The album's title track, the only single released from the album, was a top 20 hit on the Billboard 100. The Gettin' Together album was positively reviewed by critics.

== Recording and production ==
Gettin' Together was recorded in New York City in between the band touring the United States during the summer of 1967. The album was produced by Bo Gentry and Ritchie Cordell. It was Cordell's third and penultimate collaboration with the Shondells; he wrote and co-wrote half of the album's twelve tracks. While the album was being produced, keyboardist Ronnie Rosman got engaged, while lead singer Tommy James divorced his first wife of two years and got remarried.

The album was a relatively compact affair, with the longest track, "I Want to Be Around You", clocking in at three minutes and twenty seconds and the shortest track, "Sometimes I'm Up (Sometimes I'm Down)", clocking in at one minute and fifty-five seconds. The album's only single was the title track (backed with "Real Girl" another album cut), released in August 1967. While James was unhappy with the single's production, it was a commercial success, reaching the top 20 of the Billboard 100 charts, peaking at number 18.

== Reception and legacy ==
Professional ratings
Retrospective reviews
Review scores
Source	Rating
AllMusic	3.5/5 stars
The Encyclopedia of Popular Music	2/5 stars
Semana	3/4 stars

Gettin' Together received positive reviews. Jane Scott of The Plain Dealer deemed it the best album of the week, writing that "James can't seem to miss". Her favorite track from the album was "I Want to Be Around You", which she compared to the band's earlier single "Mirage" and wrote that "it could have been longer". Other tracks that she highlighted include "So Deep with You" ("a beautiful melody"), "Lost in Your Eyes" ("a slow, almost crooning ballad done with real feeling"), and "Some Happy Day" ("a peppier change of pace"). Billboard magazine called the album more experimental than the band's other fare, singling out "Some Happy Day", "Sometimes I'm Up", and "You Better Watch Out" as possessing "some unusual experimental sounds". David F. Wagner of The Post-Crescent, on the other hand, wrote that the album highlighted the band's "ability to be conventional, even trivial, without becoming a drag". Semana gave the album three stars out of four.

Writing retrospectively for AllMusic, Joe Viglione called the album a transitional release, building upon the bubblegum sound of their earlier work while incorporating stylistic elements reminiscent of contemporary psychedelic and sunshine pop acts like the Spencer Davis Group, the Yardbirds, and Every Mother's Son. Viglione compared the guitar riffs on "You Better Watch Out" to the Yardbirds' "Over Under Sideways Down", further reflecting the band's evolving influences, while noting "Some Happy Day" as continuing the subtle production experimentation previously explored in "Mirage". A writer for Dusty Groove called the album "often as deeply catchy as their bigger hits, but also a bit more obscure as well—which makes this album a lot more fresh than some of their other records! There's still a nice raw jangly quality to the backdrops, which really offsets the sweet vocals nicely".

The closing track "Lost in Your Eyes" was later sampled in the Avalanches song "The Wozard of Iz" from Wildflower (2016).

== Track listing ==
All songs were arranged by Jimmy Wisner, with vocal arrangements by Bo Gentry and Ritchie Cordell.

Side one
No.	Title	Writer(s)	Length
1.	"Gettin' Together"	Ritchie Cordell	2:19
2.	"I Want to Be Around You"	Jimmy Calvert, Norman Marzano, Paul Naumann	3:20
3.	"There's So Much Love All Around Me"	Gary Illingsworth, Paul Vance	2:40
4.	"Some Happy Day"	Bo Gentry, Ritchie Cordell	2:16
5.	"Love's Closin' in On Me"	Bo Gentry, Mike Vale, Ritchie Cordell, Tommy James	2:17
6.	"So Deep with You"	Ritchie Cordell	2:48

Side two
No.	Title	Writer(s)	Length
1.	"Sometimes I'm Up (Sometimes I'm Down)"	Ritchie Cordell	1:55
2.	"You Better Watch Out"	Mike Vale, Tommy James	2:05
3.	"Real Girl"	Darla Landan, Darlene Landan	2:18
4.	"Wish It Were You"	Mike Vale, Tommy James	2:01
5.	"World, Down on Your Knees"	Sal Trimachi, Ritchie Cordell	2:15
6.	"Lost in Your Eyes"	Mike Vale, Tommy James	2:05
Total length:			29:59

== Charts ==
Year	Chart	Peak position
1967	US Record World 100 Top LPs	89
