= Don Fardon =

English pop singer (born 1940)

- Born: Donald Arthur Fardon; 19 August 1940 (age 86); Coventry, Warwickshire, England
- Genres: Freakbeat, pop
- Label: Piccadilly

Donald Arthur Fardon (born 19 August 1940) is an English pop singer.

Fardon is best known for his cover of the song "Indian Reservation" (1968), a UK number 3 hit and global million selling disc. He also wrote the football anthem "Belfast Boy" about George Best.

== Career ==
Prior to becoming a singer, Fardon worked as a draughtsman for Alfred Herberts Ltd in Coventry. Before his solo success, Fardon was a singer with The Sorrows.

His biggest success was his cover version of "Indian Reservation" by John D. Loudermilk (1968, Billboard Hot 100: number 20; 1970, UK: number 3; Australia: number 4). The global sales were estimated at over one million copies.

His follow-up single "Belfast Boy", composed in honour of the Manchester United and Northern Ireland player George Best, reached number 32 in the UK singles chart. "Follow Your Drum" reached number 16 on the Australian Singles Chart in May 1972.

In 1973, his track "Delta Queen" reached number 86 on the Billboard Hot 100 chart. He covered The Kinks' hit, "Lola" in 1974. Fardon also released a cover version of "Running Bear". In 2006 he re-released his single, "Belfast Boy", in tribute following the death of George Best.

His recording of the song "I'm Alive" (a cover of Tommy James & The Shondells) has been featured in a UK television advertisement for Five Alive fruit drinks, and a Dutch Vodafone commercial. On the back of the success of the latter, "I'm Alive" was reissued in the Netherlands and in March 2011, it reached the Top 20 of the Dutch singles chart.

== Discography ==
=== Albums ===
- Lament of the Cherokee Indian Reservation (1968) GNP
- I've Paid My Dues (1970) Decca
- Released (1970) Youngblood
- Indian Reservation (1988) GNP
- Line Dance Party (1998) Grasmere
- Indian Reservation (1999) Elap
- I'm Alive (2003) RPM
- Letter (2005) Magic
- Coventry Boy (2006) Castle

=== Singles ===
- "Indian Reservation (The Lament of the Cherokee Reservation Indian)" - 1968
- "I'm Alive" - 1969 (re-issued 2011)
- "Belfast Boy" - originally released 20 March 1970 (re-issued 2006)

== See also ==
- List of 1960s one-hit wonders in the United States
