= It's Only Love (Tommy James and the Shondells song) =

Single by Tommy James and the Shondells

from the album It's Only Love
- B-side: "Don't Let My Love Pass You By"
- Released: 1966
- Genre: Rock
- Length: 2:05
- Label: Roulette
- Songwriters: Morris Levy, Ritchie Cordell, Sal Trimachi

Tommy James and the Shondells singles chronology
"Say I Am (What I Am)" (1966)	"It's Only Love" (1966)	"I Think We're Alone Now" (1967)

"It's Only Love" is a song written by Morris Levy, Ritchie Cordell, and Sal Trimachi and recorded by Tommy James and the Shondells for their 1966 album, It's Only Love. Levy, the owner of Roulette Records (Tommy James and the Shondells' label) often insisted that he receive a writing credit on songs in order to receive royalty payments. The song reached No. 31 on the Billboard Hot 100 in 1966. The song also reached No. 10 in Canada.

The original B-side was "Don't Let My Love Pass You By". Later releases included a remake of Lee Dorsey's song "Ya Ya".
