= Alive 'N Kickin' =

American pop/rock band

- Origin: Brooklyn, New York
- Genres: Pop; pop rock
- Years active: 1968–1971; 1976–present
- Label: Roulette
- Past members: Dave Shearer; Sandy Toder; Pepe Cardona; Bruce Sudano; Jeff Miller; Woody Wilson; Vito Albano; Ronny Pell; Johnny Parisio; Richie Incorvaia

Alive 'N Kickin' is an American pop group formed in Brooklyn, New York. Led by singers Pepe Cardona and Sandy Toder, they are best known for their 1970 hit "Tighter, Tighter", which peaked at number seven on the US Billboard Hot 100 chart.

The group's initial run lasted from 1968 to 1971, during which they didn't achieve success outside of "Tighter, Tighter", making them a one-hit wonder. In 1976, most of the original lineup reformed, and they've continued to perform to the present day, with various member changes. They have released one studio album, 1970's Alive 'N Kickin'.

== History ==
=== Formation: 1968 ===
The six original members formed the band when they were teenagers in 1968, in guitarist Dave Shearer's basement. The group also included Sandy Toder and Pepe Cardona on vocals, Bruce Sudano and Jeff Miller on keyboards, and Woody Wilson on bass. They gained some popularity when they began recording for Tommy James on the label he was signed to, Roulette Records.

=== "Tighter, Tighter": 1970 ===
In early 1970, the band began recording sessions for their upcoming, self-titled studio album, which came out in January. They were to record a song written and produced by Tommy James and Bob King and arranged by Jimmy Wisner, "Crystal Blue Persuasion", but James liked it so much he decided to keep it for himself. As a gesture of friendship, he wrote "Tighter, Tighter" for Alive and Kickin'. After recording the track, the group replaced Vito Albano (drums, percussion) and Shearer with Ronny Pell and Johnny Parisio. With the new lineup, "Tighter, Tighter" was released.

The song came out in May 1970 and stayed on the US chart for 16 weeks. It sold over one million copies and received a Gold disc, awarded by the R.I.A.A.

Two singles were almost immediately released to ride on the good fortune of the hit song, but after a lack of success with "Just Let It Come" and "London Bridge", and after increasing difficulties with their producer Morris Levy and the label's insistence on trying to make more singles so quickly, the band quietly broke up by early 1972.

=== Reunion: 1976 ===
Most of the group reunited in 1976, with a lineup that included Cardona, Wilson (this time on lead guitar), Shearer, Albano, and new bassist Richie Incorvaia. They played from the mid-1970s until the late 1980s. Since then, the band's lineup changed numerous times, though Cardona and Parisio remained a constant presence. Wilson, Albano, and Shearer left, and Incorvaia died.

=== Later years ===
Pepe Cardona was diagnosed with stage-3 pancreatic cancer in August 2019. The tumor was removed in April 2020, but it had spread to his stomach. He died on July 28, 2020, aged 72.

== Discography ==
Albums

Year	Title	US	Record label
1970	Alive 'N Kickin'	129	Roulette

Singles

Year	Title	US	Record label	B-side	Album
1970	"Tighter, Tighter"	7	Roulette	"Sunday Morning"	Alive 'N Kickin'
1970	"Just Let It Come"	69	Roulette	"Mother Carey's Chicken"	Alive 'N Kickin'
1971	"Good Ole Lovin' Back Home"	—	Roulette	"Junction Creek"	Alive 'N Kickin'
1971	"London Bridge"	—	Roulette	"You Gave Me Something"	Alive 'N Kickin'

== See also ==
- List of 1970s one-hit wonders in the United States
