= Asia Minor (instrumental) =

1961 single by Kokomo

Single by Kokomo

from the album Asia Minor
- B-side: "Roy's Tune"
- Released: 1961
- Genre: Rock, classical
- Length: 1:58
- Label: Future, Felsted
- Songwriter: Jimmy Wisner

Kokomo singles chronology
"Asia Minor" (1961)	"Theme from a Silent Movie" (1961)

"Asia Minor" is a 1961 instrumental recording by Jimmy Wisner (operating under the name Kokomo so as to not alienate his jazz fans). It is a rock and roll adaptation of Edvard Grieg's "Piano Concerto in A Minor", using shellac on the hammers of a cheap piano so as to induce a honky-tonk sound. He was turned down by 10 labels and had to release the track on his own label Future Records. The song became a hit, reaching No. 8 on the Billboard Hot 100 and No. 35 on the UK Singles Chart, despite having been banned by the BBC, which at the time refused airplay for music found to violate various standards, including pieces deemed to "[distort] melody, harmony and rhythm".

== Background ==
Wisner had previously had two albums out as part of the Jimmy Wisner Trio, but had the idea for adapting a famous classical piece into a boogie-woogie-style piano track. Even though Wisner had many connections in the music industry, no one was willing to take a chance on it; ten rejections later, including from Felsted Records that had released his previous two albums, Wisner decided to release the record on his own label, Future Records. To avoid alienating the jazz community, Wisner used the pseudonym "Kokomo". As a result, no interviews, photographs or performances as Kokomo were ever given in support of "Asia Minor".

Wisner has said the title came from the piece's key, A minor. When someone at the recording session asked in which key the piece is in, the reply was "Asia Minor".

The piece was recorded on a cheap, out-of-tune, piano bought for $50. Wisner had applied shellac to the hammers to achieve a jauntier sound. The record charted at number 8 on the Billboard Hot 100.

In the UK, the BBC had a policy of banning records which were seen to parody classical music, and this recording fell foul of it. Despite the ban, it charted at number 35 on the UK Singles Chart.

The recording spawned a number of follow-ups: B. Bumble and the Stingers' "Bumble Boogie", based on Nikolai Rimsky-Korsakov's "Flight of the Bumblebee", and Paul Revere & the Raiders' "Like, Long Hair", based on Sergei Rachmaninoff's "Prelude in C-sharp minor", followed “Asia Minor” into the top forty of the Billboard Hot 100. Al Hazan of B. Bumble and the Stingers recorded an adaptation of "Malagueña" by Ernesto Lecuona on Phil Spector's Philles label under the name Ali Hassan, though that failed to crack the Billboard Hot 100. B. Bumble and the Stingers returned the following year with "Nut Rocker", an adaptation of Tchaikovsky's Nutcracker ballet, which broke the top 40 and charted at #1 on the UK Singles Chart on original release and #19 ten years later upon rerelease in 1972.

== Critical reception ==
Cub Koda of AllMusic said that “Asia Minor” was "a record much bigger than [Wisner's] jazz recordings, and the subsequent trips back to the well that followed on album and singles are all collected on a 21-track [CD] compilation [of the same title]. What Wisner came up with was a one-hit novelty sound, but he had enough music behind it to make subsequent knockoffs quite listenable."

== Chart Positions ==
Charts (1961)	Peak Position
U.S. Billboard Hot 100	8
UK Single Charts	35
