= Tighter, Tighter =

1970 single by Alive 'N Kickin'

Single by Alive 'N Kickin'

from the album Alive 'N Kickin'
- B-side: "Sunday Morning"
- Released: June 1970
- Genre: Pop rock
- Length: 2:45
- Label: Roulette Records 7078
- Songwriters: Bob King, Tommy James
- Producers: Bob King, Tommy James

Alive 'N Kickin' singles chronology
"Tighter, Tighter" (1970)	"Just Let It Come" (1970)

"Tighter, Tighter" is a song written by Bob King and Tommy James, and recorded by the pop group Alive 'N Kickin' for their self-titled 1970 album: the tune was produced by King and James. The song reached No. 7 on the Billboard Hot 100 in August 1970, and peaked at No. 5 in Canada.

== Other versions ==
James released a version of the song in 1976 as a single, but it did not chart.

== Chart performance ==
=== Weekly charts ===
Chart (1970)	Peak position
Australia Kent Music Report	23
Canada RPM	5
U.S. Billboard Hot 100	7
U.S. Cash Box Top 100	5

=== Year-end charts ===
Chart (1970)	Rank
Australia	189
Canada	87
U.S. Billboard Hot 100	47
U.S. Cash Box	43

== See also ==
- List of 1970s one-hit wonders in the United States
