= Belfast Boy =

Single by Don Fardon
- B-side: "Echoes of the Cheers"
- Released: March 1970
- Genre: Pop rock
- Length: 2:14
- Label: Young Blood
- Songwriter(s): Tony Colton, Johnny Harris & Raymond Barry Smith

Don Fardon singles chronology
"Indian Reservation" (1968)	"Belfast Boy" (1970)	"Follow Your Drum" (1972)

"Belfast Boy" is a song by the British singer Don Fardon. Released as a single in March 1970 it spent five weeks in the UK Singles Charts, peaking at number 32. It is a tribute to the Manchester United and Northern Ireland footballer George Best, then at the height of his career. It was featured in a BBC documentary of the same year The World of Georgie Best.

Although less successful than another football-themed song of the same year "Back Home" by the England World Cup squad, it became established as a football anthem and was closely associated with the player. Following the death of Best in 2005, Fardon re-released the single which reached number 77 in the British charts.

== Bibliography ==
- Lawrence Goldman. Oxford Dictionary of National Biography 2005-2008. Oxford University Press, 2013.
- Wayne Jancik. The Billboard Book of One-hit Wonders. Billboard Books, 1998.
