= Gettin' Together (song) =

Single by Tommy James and the Shondells

from the album Gettin' Together
- B-side: "Real Girl"
- Released: August 1967
- Genre: Rock
- Length: 2:18
- Label: Roulette
- Songwriter: Ritchie Cordell
- Producers: Bo Gentry, Ritchie Cordell

Tommy James and the Shondells singles chronology
"I Like the Way" (1967)	"Gettin' Together" (1967)	"Out of the Blue" (1967)

"Gettin' Together" is a song written by Ritchie Cordell and recorded by Tommy James and the Shondells for their 1967 album, Gettin' Together. The song reached number 18 on The Billboard Hot 100 in 1967. The song also reached number 24 in Canada. The song was the group's fourth charting single of the year. "Gettin' Together" is based on the opening bass riff of "Gimme Some Lovin'", a single by the Spencer Davis Group released in 1966. However, the remainder of "Gettin' Together" continues in the pop-rock direction James began in his previous album, I Think We're Alone Now, under the tutelage and production of Ritchie Cordell and Bo Gentry. Jimmy Wisner arranged the music for the song. A cover version of the song was also done by Gene Pitney.

== Critical reception ==
Alfie Sansom from Argus Far described Side A of the album as "executed with enough panache to not become cloying or dated into apparent parody", while adding that the title track "even nicks a Spencer Davis Group bassline, how much more sixties can you get?".

== Charts ==
Chart (1967)	Peak position
New Zealand (Listener)	17
Billboard Hot 100	18
