= Three Times in Love =

Single by Tommy James

from the album Three Times in Love
- B-side: "I Just Wanna Play the Music"
- Released: December 1979
- Genre: Pop rock, soft rock
- Length: 4:09 (single version); 4:29 (album version)
- Label: Millennium Records 11785
- Songwriters: Tommy James, Ron Serota
- Producer: Tommy James

Tommy James singles chronology
| "Love is Gonna Find a Way" (1977) | "Three Times in Love" (1979) | "You Got Me" (1980) |

"Three Times in Love" is a song written by Tommy James and Ron Serota and performed by James. The song was James's first top 40 hit in eight years and his last in the United States. It reached No. 1 on the adult contemporary chart, No. 19 on the Billboard Hot 100, No. 64 in Canada, and No. 93 on the U.S. country chart in 1980. It was featured on his 1979 album, Three Times in Love.

The song was produced by James.

== See also ==
- List of Billboard Adult Contemporary number ones of 1980
