= Sweet Cherry Wine =

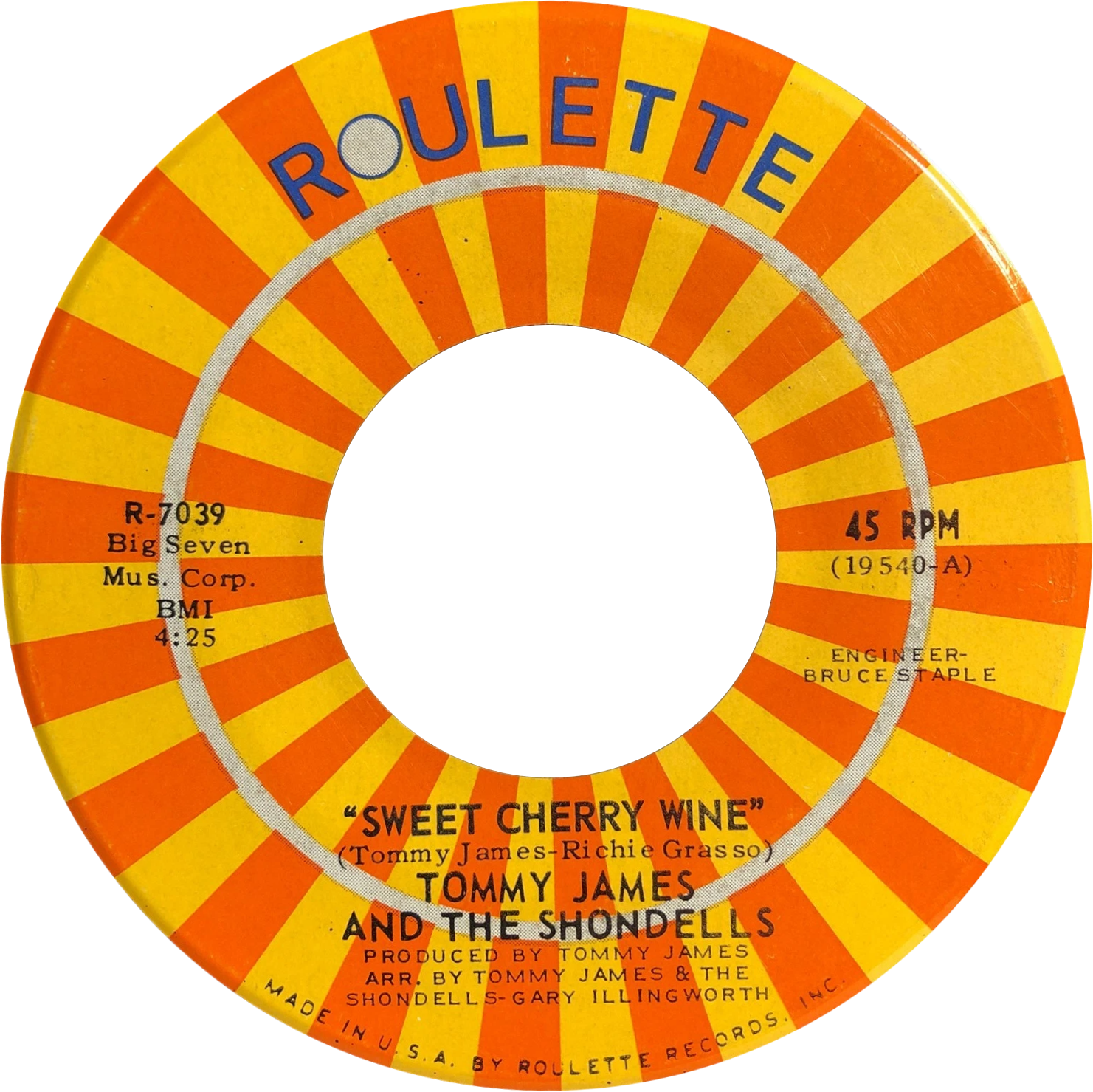
- One of side-A labels of the US single

Single by Tommy James and the Shondells

from the album Cellophane Symphony
- B-side: "Breakaway"
- Released: March 1969
- Genre: Psychedelic pop
- Length: 4:09
- Label: Roulette
- Songwriters: Richard Grasso, Tommy James
- Producer: Tommy James

Tommy James and the Shondells singles chronology
"Crimson and Clover" (1968)	"Sweet Cherry Wine" (1969)	"Crystal Blue Persuasion" (1969)

Audio
- "Sweet Cherry Wine" by Tommy James and the Shondells on YouTube

"Sweet Cherry Wine" is a song performed by Tommy James and the Shondells from their 1969 album, Cellophane Symphony. The song was co-written by James and Richie Grasso, another singer-songwriter signed to Morris Levy's Roulette Records. It hit number seven on the Billboard Hot 100 and rose to number six on the Canadian charts. This psychedelic song was released at the height of psychedelia, right after one previous 'mind expanding' song by Tommy James and the Shondells, "Crimson and Clover", and before "Crystal Blue Persuasion". It begins with the use of an organ, adds brass instruments, and ends with a solo flute that fades out at the end. Adding to the feel of this form of music, this and other songs on the album included the then-new Moog synthesizer.

James, in an interview on the Christian Broadcasting Network (CBN) in 2010 stated that the song "was about the blood of Jesus" and acknowledged that many fans and peers assumed it was drug related.

The track was recorded at Broadway Sound Studios in Manhattan, New York, because at the time, James' regular studio was closed due to it being serviced and upgraded from 16 track to 24 track. He would resume working at Allegro Sound Studios after he recorded Sweet Cherry Wine.

It is also a protest song about the Vietnam War.

== Chart performance ==
=== Weekly charts ===
Chart (1969)	Peak position
Canada Top Singles (RPM)	6
US Billboard Hot 100	7
US Cash Box Top 100	10

== See also ==
- List of anti-war songs
