= Piano Concerto (Grieg) =

1868 piano concerto by Edvard Grieg

- by Edvard Grieg
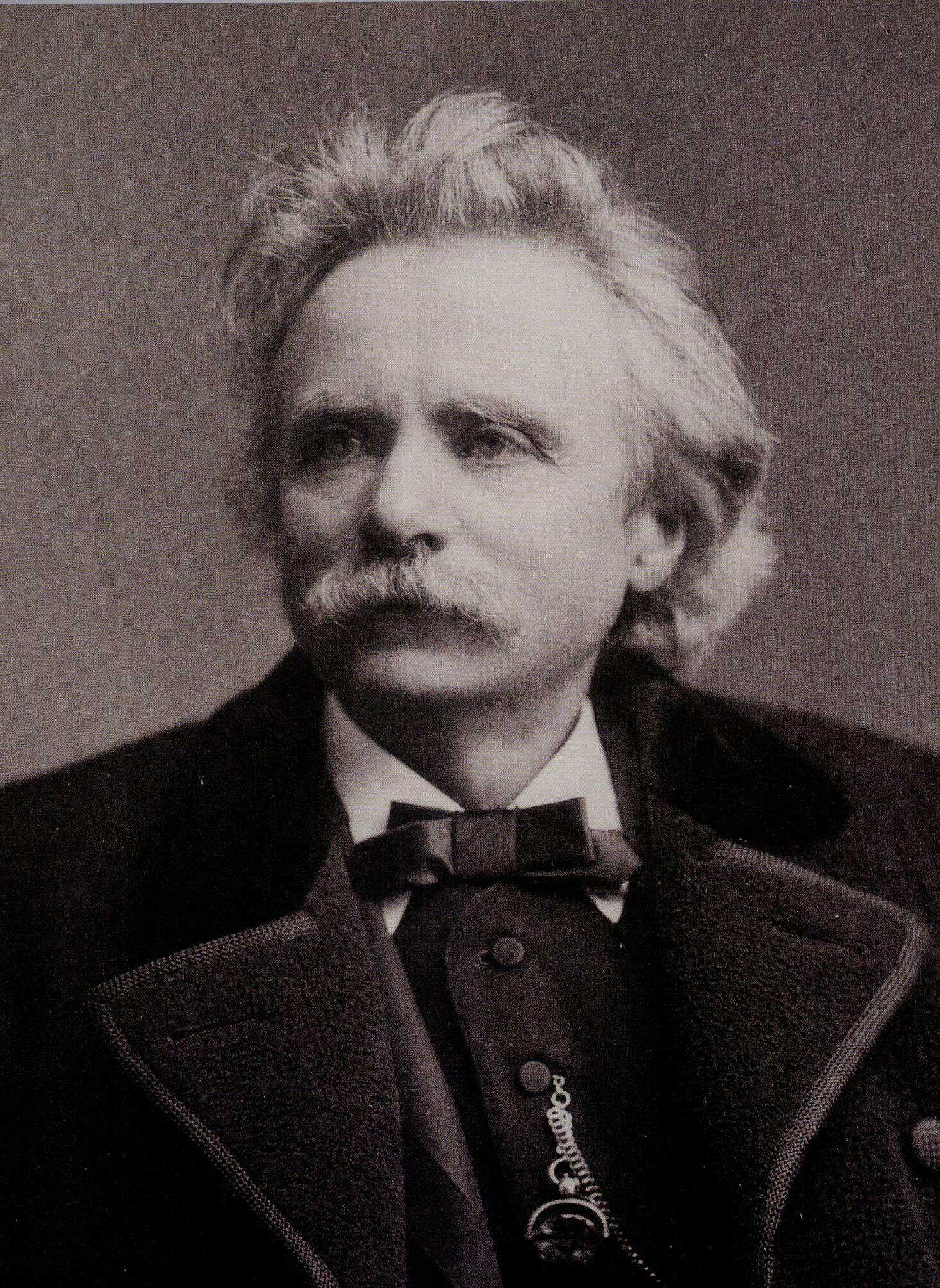
- Grieg in 1888
- Key: A minor
- Opus: 16
- Period: Romantic
- Composed: 1868
- Movements: 3

Premiere
- Date: 3 April 1869
- Location: Copenhagen

The Piano Concerto in A minor, Op. 16, composed by Edvard Grieg in 1868, was the only concerto Grieg completed. It is one of his most popular works, and is among the most popular of the genre. Grieg was only 24 years old at the time of the composition.

A typical performance of the concerto is about 30 minutes.

== Structure ==
The concerto is in three movements:

1. Allegro molto moderato (A minor)
2. Adagio (D♭ major)
3. Allegro moderato molto e marcato – Quasi presto – Andante maestoso (A minor → F major → A minor → A major)

=== I. Allegro molto moderato ===
The first movement is in sonata form and is noted for the timpani roll in its first bar that leads to a dramatic piano flourish, which leads to the main theme.

Then the key changes to C major, for the secondary theme. Later, the secondary theme appears again in the recapitulation, but this time in the key of A major. The movement finishes with a virtuosic cadenza and a flourish similar to that at the start of the movement.

=== II. Adagio ===
The second movement is a lyrical movement in D♭ major, which leads directly into the third movement. The movement is in ternary form (A–B–A). The B section is in D♭ major and F♭ major, then returns to D♭ major for the reprise of the piano.

=== III. Allegro moderato molto e marcato – Quasi presto – Andante maestoso ===
The third movement opens in A minor 2/4 time with an energetic theme (Theme 1), which is influenced by the Norwegian Halling dance:

It is followed by a lyrical theme in F major (Theme 2). The movement returns to Theme 1. Following this recapitulation is the 3/4 A major Quasi presto section, which consists of a variation of Theme 1. The movement concludes with the Andante maestoso in A major, which consists of a dramatic rendition of Theme 2 (as opposed to the lyrical fashion with which Theme 2 is introduced).

== Instrumentation ==
Grieg scored the concerto for solo piano, 2 flutes, 2 oboes, 2 clarinets (in A and B♭), 2 bassoons, 4 horns in E and E♭, 2 trumpets in C and B♭, 3 trombones, timpani and strings (violins, violas, cellos and double basses). An earlier version called for only two horns and a tuba instead of a third trombone.

== History and influences ==
I. Allegro molto moderato

II. Adagio

III. Allegro moderato molto e marcato – Andante quasi – Presto
Performed by Neal O'Doan with the University of Washington Symphony Orchestra under Peter Erős

The work is among Grieg's earliest important works, written by the 24-year-old composer in 1868 in Søllerød, Denmark, during one of his visits there to benefit from the climate.

The concerto is often compared to the Piano Concerto of Robert Schumann: it is in the same key; the opening descending flourish on the piano is similar; the overall style is considered to be closer to Schumann than any other single composer. Incidentally, both composers wrote only one concerto for piano. Grieg had heard Schumann's concerto played by Clara Schumann in Leipzig in 1858, and was greatly influenced by Schumann's style generally, having been taught the piano by Schumann's friend Ernst Ferdinand Wenzel.

Grieg's concerto provides evidence of his interest in Norwegian folk music; the opening flourish is based on the motif of a falling minor second followed by a falling major third, which is typical of the folk music of Grieg's native country. This specific motif occurs in other works by Grieg, including the String Quartet No. 1. In the last movement of the concerto, similarities to the halling (a Norwegian folk dance) and imitations of the Hardanger fiddle (the Norwegian folk fiddle) have been detected.

The work was premiered by Edmund Neupert on 3 April 1869, in Copenhagen, with Holger Simon Paulli conducting. Some sources say that Grieg himself, an excellent pianist, was the intended soloist, but he was unable to attend the premiere owing to commitments with an orchestra in Christiania (now Oslo). Among those who did attend the premiere were the Danish composer Niels Gade and the Russian pianist Anton Rubinstein, who provided his piano for the occasion. Neupert was also the dedicatee of the concerto.

The Norwegian premiere in Christiania followed on August 7, 1869, and the piece was later heard in Germany in 1872 and England in 1874. At Grieg's visit to Franz Liszt in Rome in 1870, Liszt played the notes a prima vista (by sight) before an audience of musicians and gave very good comments on Grieg's work which would later influence him. The work was first published in Leipzig in 1872, but only after Johan Svendsen intervened on Grieg's behalf.

The French premiere was on 17 March 1878 at the Cirque d'hiver in Paris, during the Concerts Pasdeloup, under the baton of Jules Pasdeloup.

The concerto is the first piano concerto ever recorded—by pianist Wilhelm Backhaus in 1909. Due to the technology of the time, it was heavily abridged and ran only six minutes.

Grieg revised the work at least seven times, usually in subtle ways, but the revisions amounted to over 300 differences from the original orchestration. In one of these revisions, he undid Liszt's suggestion to give the second theme of the first movement (as well as the first theme of the second) to the trumpet rather than to the cello. The final version of the concerto was completed only a few weeks before Grieg's death, and it is this version that has achieved worldwide popularity. The original 1868 version has been recorded, by Love Derwinger, with the Norrköping Symphony Orchestra under Junichi Hirokami.

Grieg worked on a transcription of the concerto for two solo pianos, which was completed by Károly Thern. The premiere recording of this version was by the British piano duo Anthony Goldstone and Caroline Clemmow.

On April 2, 1951, the Russian-born American pianist Simon Barere collapsed while playing the first few bars of the concerto, in a performance with conductor Eugene Ormandy and the Philadelphia Orchestra at Carnegie Hall in New York. He died backstage shortly afterwards. It was to have been Barere's first performance of the work.

== Second concerto ==
In 1882 and 1883, Grieg worked on a second piano concerto in B minor, but it was never completed. The sketches for the concerto have been recorded by the pianist Einar Steen-Nøkleberg. In 1997, the Oslo Grieg Society held its Third International Competition for Composers on the theme: of "re-imagine" Grieg's second concerto. One of the contestants, the Belgian composer Laurent Beeckmans, elaborated a full piano concerto from the sketches, which was first performed in London on 3 May 2003.

Another elaboration on Grieg's sketches was completed by the Norwegian composer Helge Evju and was recorded by the Naxos label. Among the other contestants the Romanian Șerban Nichifor (Concerto GRIEGoriano), the Russian Vladimir Belyayev (Second Piano Concerto), the Scottish Callum Kenmuir (Rhapsody on themes by Grieg), the American Daniel Powers (Concerto Reliquary), the German Klaus Miehling (Concert Fantasy in B minor), the New Zealander Alison Edgar (Fantasia in B minor), the Australian David Morgan (Norwegian Fantasy). The 1st prize went to the Italian Alberto Colla (Piano Concerto No. 1).

== In popular culture ==
The enduring popularity of Grieg's Piano Concerto has ensured its use in a wide variety of contexts.

- The first movement's coda features in the film Intermezzo (1939) starring Leslie Howard and Ingrid Bergman.
- The Concerto was featured in the film The Seventh Veil (1945) as the piece played by the young concert pianist (Ann Todd; the uncredited pianist was Eileen Joyce).
- It was famously parodied in Franz Reizenstein's Concerto Popolare of 1959 (written for Gerard Hoffnung's music festival).
- The opening theme of the first movement was used by Jimmy Wisner, recording under the name "Kokomo", in the song "Asia Minor", a top-ten pop hit in the U.S. in 1961. The title of the song was also based on the key of the concerto, A minor.
- Excerpts from the first movement are incorporated into the number "Rosemary", in the Broadway musical How to Succeed in Business Without Really Trying (1961).
- The band Jethro Tull have played a short excerpt of the second movement live as part of their Thick as a Brick tour of 1972.
- The comedian Bill Bailey is a skilled musician, and has used Grieg's piano concerto for comic effect; in the TV series Black Books it is played by his character Manny Bianco, and it is cited as an example in his solo mock-scholarly sketch on cockney music.
- The introductory motif opens "Make the Most of Your Music", in the 1987 revised version of Follies.
- Cuban bandleader Alfredo Valdés repeatedly references the first movement of the concerto in Canto a La Vueltabajera.Canto a La Vueltabajera on YouTube
- The strategy video game Civilization V also uses the second movement in its soundtrack.
- The second movement's theme features in the spy thriller Red Sparrow (2018).

=== Morecambe and Wise ===
The concerto was used in a sketch by the British comedians Morecambe and Wise. Originally written by Dick Hills and Sid Green and performed as a two-hander in the ITV series Two of a Kind in 1963, the sketch was subsequently amended and used again in the Christmas edition of The Morecambe & Wise Show, the duo's BBC series, in 1971. The sketch features Eric Morecambe as the piano soloist; while Ernie Wise was the conductor in the original sketch, the amended version features André Previn, then the principal conductor of the London Symphony Orchestra. Morecambe claims he is playing "all the right notes, but not necessarily in the right order". He was playing a simplified version of the correct music but in a completely inappropriate style.

The sketch was recorded, in an arrangement by Sid Green, in 1964 for the EMI Comedy Classics album series.
