= Five Alive =

Line of fruit juice blends

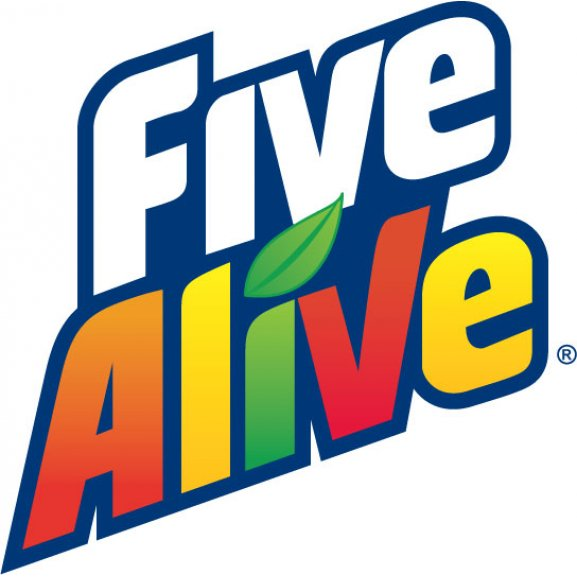
- Type: Fruit juice
- Origin: United States
- Variants: Citrus; Passionate Peach Citrus; Tropical Citrus; Berry Citrus; Mango Citrus; Pomegranate Citrus; Snow Crop
- Website: https://www.coca-cola.ca/brands/five-alive

Five Alive (French: Déli-cinq) is a line of fruit juice blends created by Minute Maid, a subsidiary of the Coca-Cola Company. Both the name and the five colors of the logo refer to the five fruit juices each variety contains.

The juice line was first introduced in the late 1970s in both 12 US fl oz (350 ml) and 16 US fl oz (470 ml) cans. Marketing for Five Alive featured the catchphrase “get a taste for life”.

Starting in 1981, Five Alive was released in juice boxes alongside cans. By the 1990s, the beverages were no longer produced for the U.S. market. However, Five Alive continues to be produced and is widely available in Canada.

== Varieties ==
- Citrus (orange, lemon, grapefruit, tangerine, and lime)
- Passionate Peach Citrus (peach, grape, orange, passion fruit, and lemon)
- Tropical Citrus (orange, apricot, guava, mango, and passion fruit)
- Berry Citrus (apple, blackcurrant, grape, raspberry, and strawberry)
- Mango Citrus (mango, kiwifruit, dragon fruit, granadilla, and banana)
- Pomegranate Citrus (grape, orange, pomegranate, tangerine, and lemon)
- Snow Crop (apple, grape, lemon, pineapple, and cherry)

== Nutritional information ==
Five Alive is not a significant source of saturated fat, trans fat, cholesterol, fiber, vitamin A, calcium, or iron.

According to the nutrition information label on Canadian Five Alive products, it contains 120 calories and 29 grams of sugar per 250 mL serving, along with 63 mg of vitamin C, representing 70% of the recommended daily intake.

U.S. Five Alive labels list 41% fruit juice, with high-fructose corn syrup as an ingredient after filtered water.

In the United Kingdom, quantitative ingredient labeling is mandatory; U.K. labels show that Five Alive contains 42% fruit juice, 22% sugar, and several artificial sweeteners.
