= Crimson and Clover =

1968 single by Tommy James and the Shondells

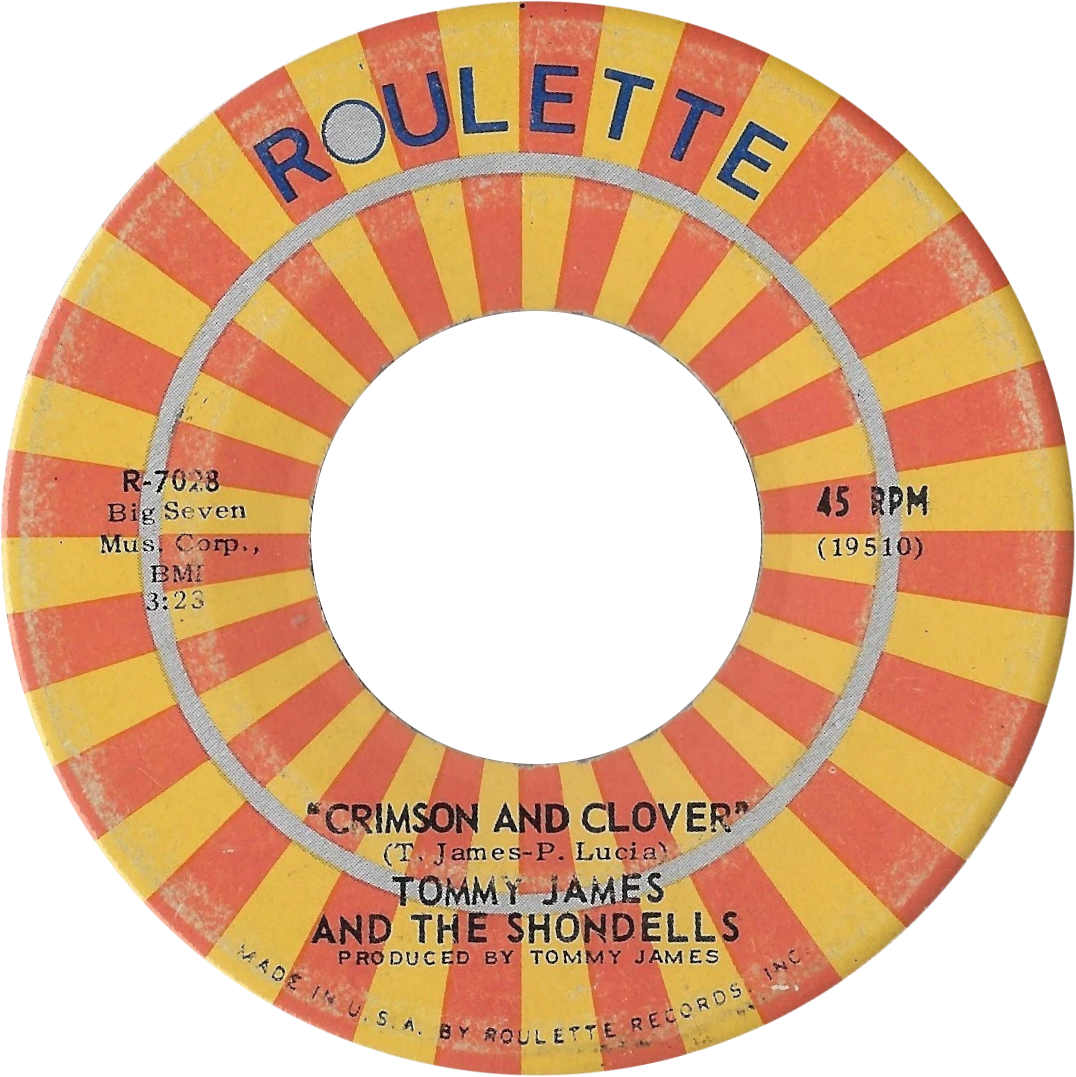
- One of side-A labels of the US single

Single by Tommy James and the Shondells

from the album Crimson & Clover
- B-side: "Some Kind of Love"; "I'm Taken"
- Released: November 1968
- Recorded: 1968
- Genre: Psychedelic pop; psychedelic rock; bubblegum pop
- Length: 5:32 (album version); 3:23 (single version)
- Label: Roulette
- Songwriters: Tommy James; Peter Lucia
- Producer: Tommy James

Tommy James and the Shondells singles chronology
"Do Something to Me" (1968)	"Crimson and Clover" (1968)	"Sweet Cherry Wine" (1969)

Audio sample
- file; help

Music video
- "Crimson and Clover" on YouTube

Audio
- "Crimson and Clover" (album version) on YouTube

"Crimson and Clover" is a 1968 song by American rock band Tommy James and the Shondells. Written by the duo of Tommy James and drummer Peter Lucia, Jr., it was intended as a change in direction of the group's sound and composition.

"Crimson and Clover" was released in late 1968 as a rough mix after a radio station leaked it. It spent 16 weeks on the U.S. charts, reaching number one in the United States (in February 1969) and at least five other countries. The single has sold 5 million copies, making it Tommy James and the Shondells' best-selling song. (The RIAA did not award a gold record, so the 5 million sales number is not officially acknowledged.) It has been recorded by many artists, most notably by Joan Jett.

In 2006, Pitchfork named it the 57th-best song of the 1960s.

== Composition and recording ==
Following the release of "Mony Mony", Tommy James wanted to change direction of the group's sound and began producing his own material. At the time, James said this was out of "necessity and ambition", wanting to move from singles into albums. He departed from the group's principal songwriters Bo Gentry and Ritchie Cordell and was given complete artistic control by Roulette Records.

The title, "Crimson and Clover", was decided before a song had been written for it. The combination of unknown meaning came to James as he was waking up, comprising his favorite color – crimson – and his favorite flower – clover. (Also, a species of clover native to Europe is called the crimson clover.) A song to fit the phrase was written by Tommy James and bassist Mike Vale, but was scrapped. His following collaboration with drummer Peter Lucia, Jr., was more successful. Lucia has said that he himself came up with the Crimson and Clover phrase while watching a high-school football game between his hometown Morristown, New Jersey Crimson and Hopatcong, New Jersey (green, or "clover"). During the song's production, Roulette Records wanted a new single, so the group agreed to release "Do Something to Me" to gain time to complete the song.

"Crimson and Clover" was recorded in late 1968 in about five hours and is one of the earliest songs recorded on 16-track equipment, which resulted in clearer vocal and instrumental audio quality that would pave the way for future music recording. Tommy James played the rhythm guitar on his 1967 Fender Jazzmaster through an Ampeg Gemini 1, while Eddie Gray played lead guitar on his 1968 Gibson Les Paul Custom through an Ampeg Gemini 2 GV-22 with tremolo effect on; Mike Vale played bass and Peter Lucia, Jr,. played drums. The song contains a tremolo effect on the guitar, set so that it vibrated in time with the song's rhythm. Near the end of the recording, the band had an idea of using the tremolo effect with vocals. To achieve this, the voice microphone was plugged into an Ampeg guitar amplifier with tremolo turned on, and the output from the amplifier was recorded while James sang "Crimson and clover, over and over".

== Single release ==
Tommy James and the Shondells on The Ed Sullivan Show in 1969, one day before their single reached number one

Tommy James made a rough mix of "Crimson and Clover" to show to Roulette Records executive Morris Levy for evaluation. The band was still intending to improve on the mix with ambient sound and echo. A few days later, James stopped at Chicago radio station WLS, where he had previously had a positive experience, to get their reaction. After an interview discussing the single, he was persuaded to play his copy of the rough mix off-air for WLS. Unbeknownst to James, the station recorded the song, which they aired with little delay – in November 1968 – as a "world exclusive".

Morris Levy had initially pleaded with WLS not to play the record prematurely, before its release, but listener response changed his mind. Roulette Records produced a specially pressed single and shipped it to listeners who called about the song. About 800 copies also were sent to WLS for promotional purposes. Levy refused to let James produce the final mix he wanted, and the single was released using the rough mix, with "Some Kind of Love" as its B-side.

"Crimson and Clover" entered the U.S. charts on December 14, where it stayed for 16 weeks on Billboard Hot 100 and 15 weeks on Cash Box Top 100. Following a performance of the song on The Ed Sullivan Show on January 26, it became number one on February 1, 1969, a position held for one week on Cash Box Top 100 and two weeks on both Billboard Hot 100 and Record World 100 Top Pops. Internationally, the song reached number one in Canada, Germany, New Zealand, Singapore, South Africa, and Switzerland. It also charted in Austria, Brazil, France, the Netherlands, Italy, Israel, Malaysia, Mexico, the Philippines, and Puerto Rico. Despite this, the song did not chart in the United Kingdom.

== Charts ==
=== Weekly charts ===
Chart (1968–1969)	Peak position
Australia (Go-Set National Top 40)	4
Austria (Ö3 Austria Top 40)	3
Belgium (Ultratop 50 Flanders)	3
Belgium (Ultratop 50 Wallonia)	2
Canadian RPM 100	1
Germany (GfK)	2
Mexico (Billboard Hits of the World)	1
Netherlands (Single Top 100)	3
New Zealand (Listener)	1
South Africa (Springbok)	1
Spain (Promusicae)	21
Switzerland (Schweizer Hitparade)	1
US Billboard Hot 100	1
US Cash Box Top 100	1

=== Year-end charts ===
Chart (1969)	Rank
Australia	38
Canada	8
Germany	13
South Africa	5
Switzerland	3
US Billboard Hot 100	10
US Cash Box Top 100	8

== Legacy ==
=== Album version ===
Based on suggestions from radio stations, Tommy James and The Shondells chose to create a longer version of "Crimson and Clover" for the album. The new material comprises verses copied without lead vocals and overdubbed with guitar solos by the group's guitarist, Ed Gray, using a pedal steel guitar and fuzz guitar. During tape copying a slight speed error was inadvertently introduced. This resulted in a small drop in pitch during the new guitar solo sections, which went unfixed. The album, also titled Crimson and Clover, was released in January 1969 and reached a peak of #8 on the Billboard 200.

=== CD and single re-releases ===
The version of "Crimson and Clover" on the 1991 Rhino Crimson and Clover/Cellophane Symphony CD (Rhino 70534) is the same as the original album version; however, digital audio workstation software was used to fix the speed and pitch error made in 1968. The CD booklet states that "Crimson and Clover" is now as it was "meant to be heard," and that Tommy James is "very satisfied" with the reissue of the recordings in CD format.

The reissue single of "Crimson and Clover" (Roulette Golden Goodies GG-72) was also pressed with the longer album version although the label still shows the original single version playing time of 3:23.

=== In popular culture ===
American rock band Jimmy Eat World reference the song in their 2002 promotional single "A Praise Chorus", with James and Lucia credited as co-writers.

== Joan Jett and the Blackhearts version ==
"Crimson and Clover"

Single by Joan Jett and the Blackhearts

from the album I Love Rock 'n Roll
- B-side: "Oh Woe Is Me"
- Released: April 1982
- Recorded: 1981
- Genre: Punk rock
- Length: 3:16
- Label: Boardwalk
- Songwriters: Tommy James; Peter Lucia
- Producers: Ritchie Cordell; Kenny Laguna

Joan Jett and the Blackhearts singles chronology
"I Love Rock 'n' Roll" (1981)	"Crimson and Clover" (1982)	"Do You Wanna Touch Me" (1982)

Music video
- "Crimson and Clover" on YouTube

Joan Jett and the Blackhearts covered "Crimson and Clover" on their debut LP in 1981. In 1982, they reached #7 on the Billboard Hot 100 with their rendition (in a slightly enhanced AOR/single mix), their second-highest charting hit in the U.S. They also reached #4 in Canada and #6 in Australia, in addition to charting in parts of Europe. It also features the non-album song "Oh Woe Is Me", featured on certain editions of their album I Love Rock 'n Roll.

=== Charts ===
==== Weekly charts ====
Chart (1982)	Peak position
Australia (Kent Music Report)	6
Canada RPM Top Singles	4
Germany	15
New Zealand (Listener)	11
Switzerland	8
UK	60
US Billboard Hot 100	7
US Billboard Mainstream Rock	6
US Cash Box Top 100	6

==== Year-end charts ====
Chart (1982)	Rank
Australia (Kent Music Report)	75
Canada	37
US Billboard Hot 100	78
US Cash Box Top 100	46
