= Hanky Panky (Tommy James and the Shondells song) =

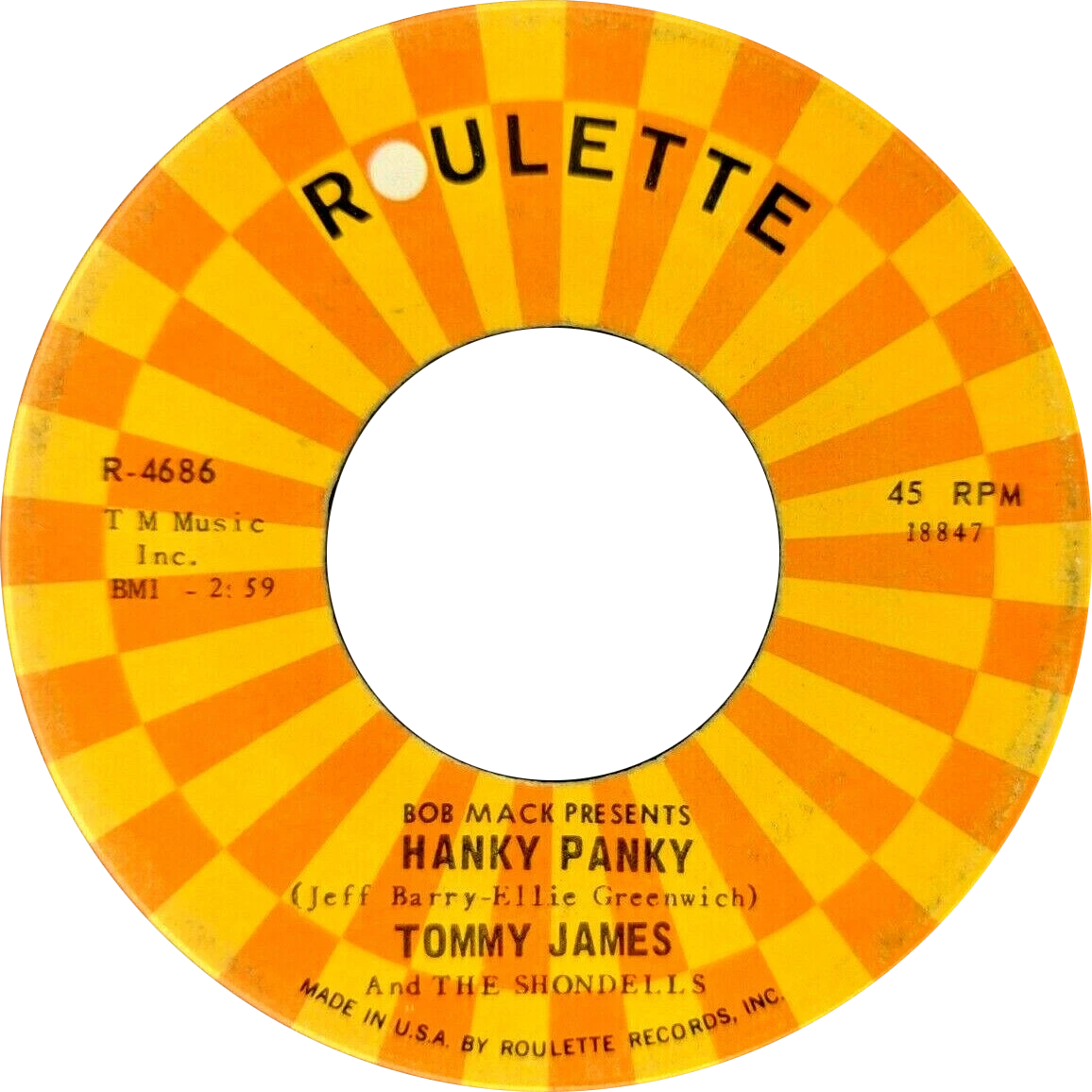
- 1966 US single reissue of the Tommy James and the Shondells recording

Single by the Shondells

from the album Hanky Panky
- B-side: "Thunderbolt"
- Released: October 1964 (original); May 1966 (re-release)
- Genre: Garage rock; R&B
- Length: 2:59
- Label: Snap!; Roulette
- Songwriters: Jeff Barry; Ellie Greenwich
- Producer: Henry Glover

The Shondells singles chronology
"Judy" (1962)	"Hanky Panky" (1964)	"Hanky Panky (re-release)" (1966)

Audio
- "Hanky Panky" by Tommy James and the Shondells on YouTube

"Hanky Panky" is a song written by Jeff Barry and Ellie Greenwich for their group, the Raindrops.

The song is better known by a version recorded in 1964 by the Shondells and later reissued in 1966 under the band's new incarnation of "Tommy James and the Shondells", reaching #1 in the United States in 1966.

== Song structure and meaning ==
Donald A. Guarisco at AllMusic wrote:

The lyrics of this song convey the excitement of a hormonal lad driven mad by a girl who knows how to do the suggestive dance of the title, building themselves around the oft-repeated lyrical hook of "My baby does the hanky panky." The music is equally simple and infectious, building itself on simple verse and chorus melodies that bounce up and down in a pleasant, bouncy fashion. James' version is pure garage rock, a live-in-the-studio effort that layered low-slung guitar riffs over a shuffling stomp of a beat from the rhythm section. James topped it off with amusingly mush-mouthed vocals a la "Louie Louie" and an out-of-control guitar solo that is cheered on by the other band members.

In the Young People's Concert episode titled "What Is a Mode?", Leonard Bernstein explained that the song was composed in the Mixolydian mode.

== Composition and history ==
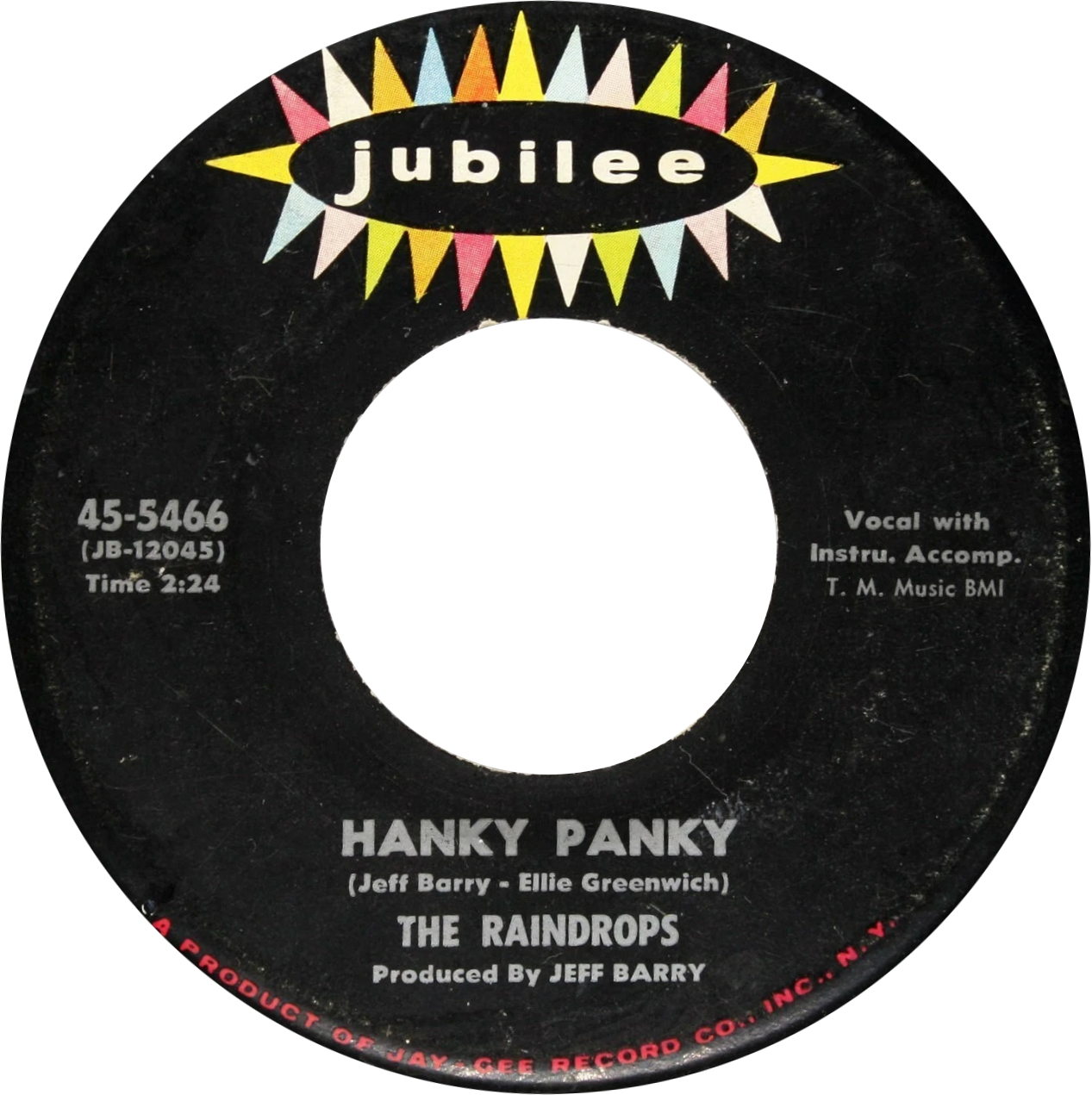
US single of the original Raindrops recording

Barry and Greenwich authored the song in 1963. They were in the middle of a recording session for their group, The Raindrops, and realized they needed a B-side for their single "That Boy John". The duo went into the hall and penned the song in 20 minutes. The pair was not particularly pleased with the song and deemed it inferior to the rest of their work. "I was surprised when [Tommy James' version] was released," Barry commented to Billboard's Fred Bronson. "As far as I was concerned it was a terrible song. In my mind it wasn't written to be a song, just a B-side." Greenwich has a different recollection of events, stating that the song was written in a car at a lover's lane; she claimed that while "everyone else was making out, Jeff and I were making music." The single "That Boy John"/"Hanky Panky" was released in November 1963. The song was also recorded by "an obscure R&B girl group", The Summits, in 1963 (as Harmon 1017/Rust 5072), but failed to chart.

Tommy James and the Shondells recorded their first song, "Long Pony Tail," in 1960 and had 500 copies pressed and distributed in southwest Michigan. Jack Douglas, a disc jockey at WNIL in Niles, Michigan, heard the song and asked James if he had other material to record. James had heard "Hanky Panky" being performed by a garage rock band in a club in South Bend, Indiana. "I really only remembered a few lines from the song, so when we went to record it, I had to make up the rest of the song," he told author Fred Bronson. "I just pieced it back together from what I remembered." "Hanky Panky" was released on Douglas' Snap Records in February 1964 (incorrectly crediting Tommy Jackson—James' real name—as the songwriter), selling well in the tri-state area of Michigan, Indiana and Illinois. However, lacking national distribution, the single's popularity quickly faded. James moved on, breaking up The Shondells and finishing high school.

In 1965, an unemployed James was contacted by Snap Records owner Jack Douglas. Pittsburgh disc jockey "Mad Mike" Metrovich had begun playing The Shondells' version of "Hanky Panky", and the single had become popular in that area. The single had been bootlegged in Pittsburgh, and slightly sped up. With the original Shondells having scattered, James realized he had to form a new band. Pittsburgh disc jockey Bob Mack took him to Pittsburgh to see several bands in the area. James hired the first decent local band he ran into, The Greensburg, Pennsylvania-based Raconteurs, to be the new Shondells. A debate continues over whether Metrovich or Mack actually broke the single in the area; James credits Mack.

After appearances on TV and in clubs in the city, James and Mack took a master of "Hanky Panky" to New York City, where Mack sold it to Roulette Records because Morris Levy owned the original rights of the song at that time and could have sued James for the incorrect credits on the Snap release. "The amazing thing is we did not re-record the song," James told Bronson. "I don't think anybody can record a song that bad and make it sound good. It had to sound amateurish like that. I think if we'd fooled with it too much we'd have fouled it up." It was released promptly and took the top position of the U.S. Billboard Hot 100 for two weeks in July 1966.

In 2003, Bob Rivers parodied the song as "Newt Gingrich Does the Hanky Panky".

The song was featured in Netflix's Sex Education and the 2002 horror movie May.

== Charts ==
=== Weekly charts ===
Chart (1966)	Peak position
Austria	2
Belgium (Flanders)	4
Belgium (Wallonia)	17
Canada RPM Top Singles	1
Netherlands	9
South Africa (Springbok)	3
UK Singles Chart	38
US Billboard Hot 100	1
US Hot R&B Singles (Billboard)	39
US Cash Box Top 100	1
West Germany	3

=== Year-end charts ===
Chart (1966)	Rank
US Billboard Hot 100	19
US Cash Box Top 100	18
