= Crystal Blue Persuasion =

1969 single by Tommy James and the Shondells

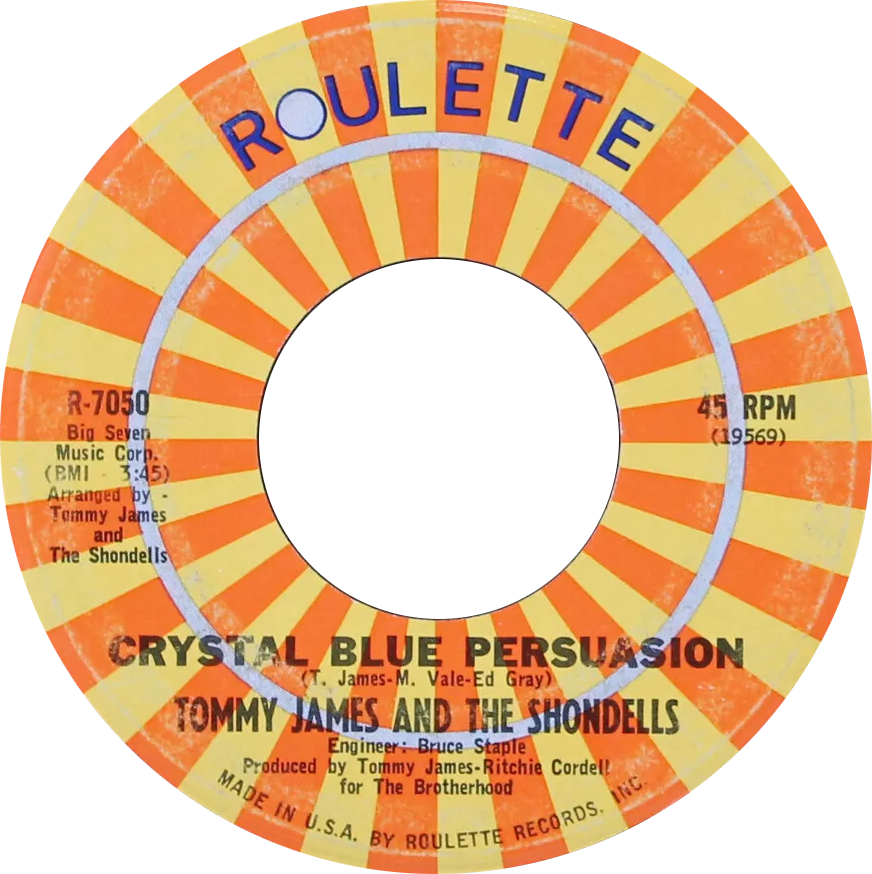
- One of side-A labels of the US single

Single by Tommy James and the Shondells

from the album Crimson & Clover
- B-side: "I'm Alive"
- Released: June 1969
- Recorded: 1968
- Genre: Philadelphia soul; psychedelic pop; sunshine pop; blue-eyed soul
- Length: 4:02 (album version); 3:45 (single version)
- Label: Roulette
- Songwriters: Eddie Gray, Tommy James, Mike Vale
- Producers: Tommy James, Ritchie Cordell

Tommy James and the Shondells singles chronology
"Sweet Cherry Wine" (1969)	"Crystal Blue Persuasion" (1969)	"Ball of Fire" (1969)

Music video
- "Crystal Blue Persuasion" on YouTube

"Crystal Blue Persuasion" is a 1968 song originally recorded by Tommy James and the Shondells and composed by Eddie Gray, Tommy James and Mike Vale. It was released as a single in June 1969 and peaked at No. 2 on the Billboard Hot 100.

== Background ==
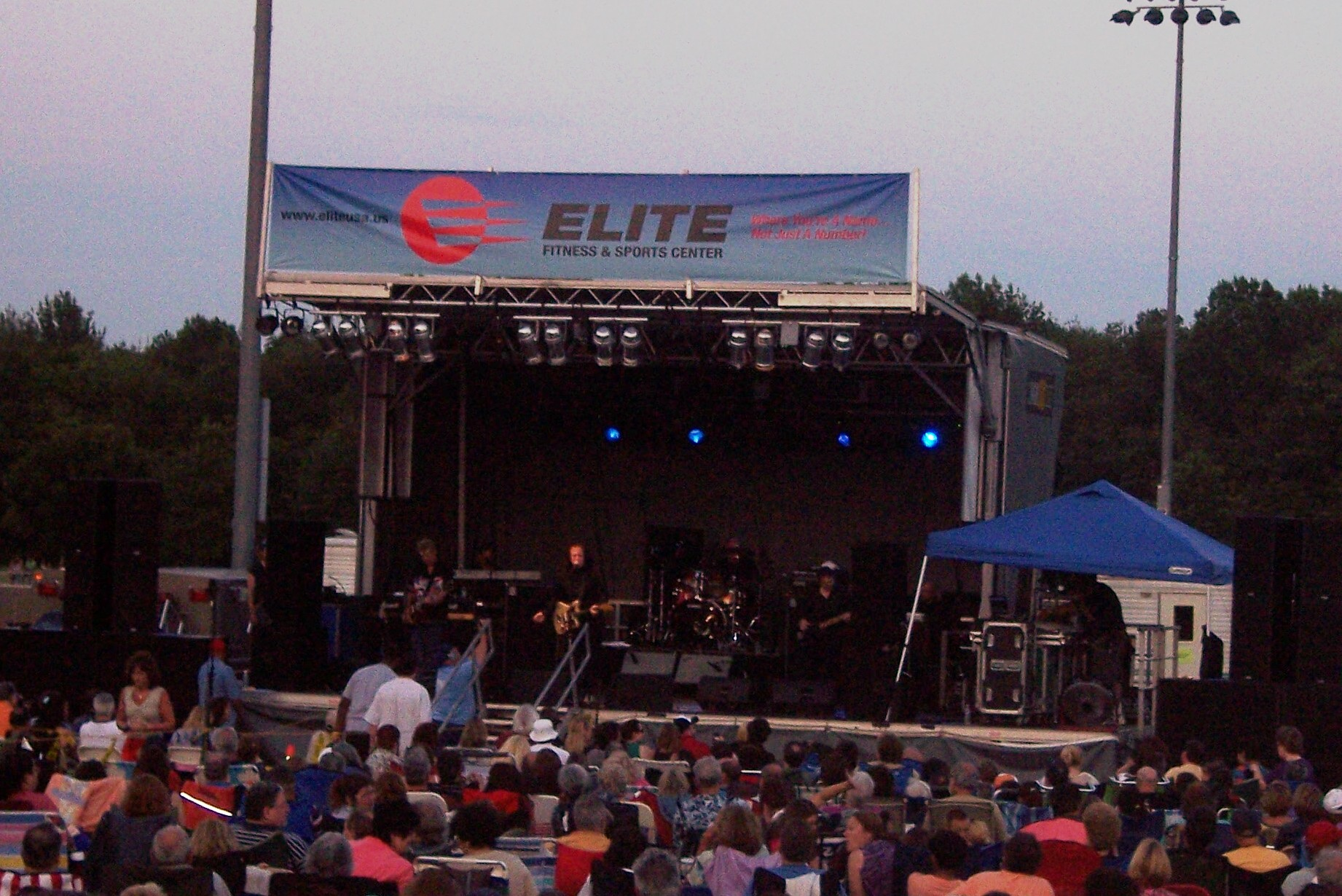
With an appropriate lighting scheme, the 2000s edition of Tommy James and the Shondells perform "Crystal Blue Persuasion"

A gentle-tempoed groove, "Crystal Blue Persuasion" was built around a prominent organ part with an understated arrangement, more akin to The Rascals' sound at the time than to James's contemporary efforts with psychedelic rock. It included melodic passages for an acoustic guitar, as well as a bass pattern, played between the bridge and the third verse of the song.

In a 1985 interview in Hitch magazine, James said the title of the song came to him while he was reading the Biblical Book of Revelation:

I took the title from the Book of Revelations [sic] in the Bible, reading about the New Jerusalem. The words jumped out at me, and they're not together; they're spread out over three or four verses. But it seemed to go together, it's my favorite of all my songs and one of our most requested.

According to James's manager, James was actually inspired by his readings of the Book of Ezekiel, which he remembered as speaking of a blue Shekhinah light that represented the presence of the Almighty God, and of the Book of Isaiah and Book of Revelation, which tell of a future age of brotherhood of mankind, living in peace and harmony.

At the time of the song's release there were several popular types of high quality blue-colored LSD tablets in circulation—some listeners generally assumed James was referring to "acid". In 1979, music writer Dave Marsh described it as "a transparent allegory about James' involvement with amphetamines."

== Chart performance ==
When released as a single in June 1969, "Crystal Blue Persuasion" became one of the biggest hits for the group, peaking at No. 2 on the Billboard Hot 100 behind Zager and Evans' "In the Year 2525" for three consecutive weeks from July 26 to August 9. In Canada, the song spent one week at No. 1. The single version differs from the album version of the song with horn overdubs added to the mix and a longer bongos overdub before the third verse.

A music video was made which showed various scenes of late 1960s political and cultural unrest and imagery of "love and peace".

== Chart history ==
=== Weekly charts ===
Chart (1969)	Peak position
Canada RPM Top Singles	1
Canada RPM Adult Contemporary	9
U.S. Billboard Hot 100	2
U.S. Billboard Easy Listening	27
U.S. Cash Box Top 100	2

=== Year-end charts ===
Chart (1969)	Rank
Canada	21
U.S. Billboard Hot 100	12
U.S. Cash Box	17

== Cover versions ==
Tito Puente, Joe Bataan, The Heptones, Morcheeba, Concrete Blonde, Jack Wagner, and John Wesley Harding are among those who have covered the song.

== Appearances in popular culture ==
"Crystal Blue Persuasion" has been used in numerous media and entertainment properties, both onscreen and off.

"Crystal Blue Persuasion" has appeared in the films A Walk on the Moon (1999), The Secret Life of Girls (1999), Zodiac (2007), The Nanny Diaries (2007), and the TV show How to Make it in America (2010). The song is also featured in the film The Expendables 2 (2012), while Barney (Sylvester Stallone) is flying his plane. It was played during the pool scene in Growing Up Brady (2000) and was in the pilot episode of The Wonder Years.

The song is referenced in Marvel Comics' Fantastic Four Annual (Vol. 1, No. 21) from 1988. The name references the character in the book, Crystalia Amaquelin, the Blue Area of the Moon where part of the story takes place, and the comic's plot of coercing Crystal to return to the Inhumans.

The title is referenced in "He Do the Police in Different Voices", the opening track from the 1993 album Plants and Birds and Rocks and Things by The Loud Family.

The song's principal riff is sampled in "Sabbatical" by German nu jazz group De-Phazz on their 2001 album Death by Chocolate.

"Crystal Blue Persuasion" was prominently featured in the 2012 Breaking Bad episode "Gliding Over All", during an elaborate montage depicting the international drug smuggling operation for Walter White's signature blue crystal meth. The montage was subsequently parodied in a special intro to The Simpsons episode "What Animated Women Want" in 2013. The Breaking Bad montage was again parodied in the 2016 Bordertown episode "Borderwall", with a montage featuring a different type of illicit smuggling operation. The Simpsons again featured the song in "Crystal Blue-Haired Persuasion" in 2019. The title is also a play on said song.
