= Jimmy Wisner =

American songwriter

- Also known as: Kokomo
- Born: James Joseph Wisner; December 8, 1931; Philadelphia, Pennsylvania, United States
- Died: March 13, 2018 (aged 86)
- Genres: Jazz, pop
- Occupations: Pianist, songwriter
- Instruments: Piano, harpsichord
- Years active: 1959–2018

James Joseph Wisner (December 8, 1931 – March 13, 2018) was an American pianist, arranger, songwriter, and producer. He is best known for his 1961 hit single "Asia Minor", released under the name Kokomo.

== Biography ==
Born in Philadelphia, Wisner received classical training as a youngster, and attended Temple University as a psychology student in the late 1950s. He formed the Jimmy Wisner Trio in 1959 with Chick Kinney on drums and Ace Tesone on bass. This ensemble backed musicians who toured through Philadelphia, including Mel Tormé, Carmen McRae, Dakota Staton, and the Hi-Lo's.

He released several full-length albums as a jazz musician, but in 1961 recorded a rock & roll adaptation of Edvard Grieg's Piano Concerto in A Minor, using shellac on the hammers of a cheap piano so as to effect a honky tonk sound. So as not to alienate his jazz fans, he released the tune, titled "Asia Minor", under the name Kokomo; he was turned down by 10 labels and had to release the track on his own label Future Records. The song became a hit, reaching #8 on the Billboard Hot 100, and #35 on the UK Singles Chart despite having been banned by the BBC. Wisner released further singles as Kokomo on his prior label, Felsted, but did not have another hit.

Following the success of "Asia Minor", Wisner launched a successful career as a songwriter, producer, and composer for film and television. With Billy Jackson, a frequent songwriting collaborator, he wrote "Don't Throw Your Love Away", a #1 UK hit for the Searchers in 1964, as well as the Tymes' "Somewhere", written with Norma Mendoza, which went Top 20 in the UK. As a producer and arranger Wisner worked with Bobby Rydell ("The Joker", by Newley-Bricusse from Roar of the Greasepaint) as well as numerous others including Cab Calloway, Freddy Cannon, Neil Sedaka, Bobby Vinton, Herbie Mann, Len Barry ("1 - 2 - 3"), Miriam Makeba, Judy Collins, Paul Evans, Spanky and Our Gang, Tony Bennett, the Cowsills, Carly Simon, Al Kooper, Iggy Pop, Barbra Streisand, Tommy James, Brigitte Bardot, and Roberto Carlos as well as Randy & the Rainbows. He also headed Columbia Records' A&R department from 1968 to 1969, where he recorded several songs, including Paul Levinson's "Sunshine Mind," with Donna Marie, who went on to perform with the Archies. In 1977, Wisner released "Music from Star Wars" on the Musicor label, featuring synthesizer arrangements of some of John Williams' Star Wars soundtrack, under the name Electric Moog Orchestra.

Wisner died on March 13, 2018, at age 86.

== Discography ==
As Jimmy Wisner

- Blues for Harvey (Felsted Records, 1959)
- Apperception (Chancellor Records, 1960)
- The Jimmy Wisner Sound: Featuring Love Theme from "Romeo and Juliet" (Columbia Records, 1969)

As Jimmy Wisner Orchestra

- Cast Your Fate To The Wind (Wyncote Records, 1964)

As Kokomo

- Asia Minor (Felsted Records, 1961)

As Electric Moog Orchestra

- Music From Star Wars (Musicor Records, 1977)

=== As sideman ===
With Herbie Mann

- Our Mann Flute (Atlantic, 1966)
- The Beat Goes On (Atlantic, 1967)
