= Tommy James =

American musician (born 1947)

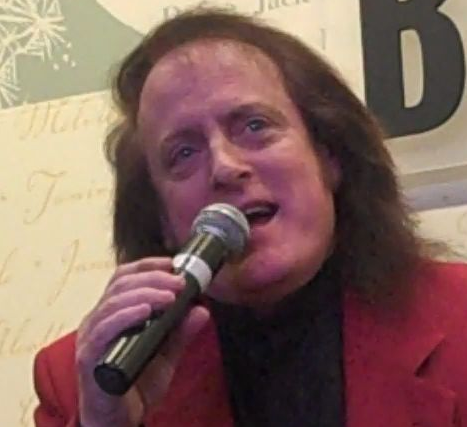
- James in 2010

Background information
- Born: Thomas Gregory Jackson; April 29, 1947 (age 79); Dayton, Ohio, US
- Origin: Niles, Michigan, US
- Genres: Rock; pop rock; psychedelic rock
- Occupations: Singer-songwriter; guitarist
- Instruments: Vocals; guitar; keyboards; tambourine
- Years active: 1959–present
- Labels: Roulette; Fantasy; Millennium; Rhino; Aegis; Aura
- Member of: Tommy James and the Shondells
- Formerly of: Hog Heaven
- Website: Tommy James and the Shondells

Tommy James (born Thomas Gregory Jackson; April 29, 1947) is an American musician, singer, songwriter, and record producer. James is the frontman of the rock band Tommy James and the Shondells, which is known for hit singles such as "Mony Mony", "Crimson and Clover", and "Crystal Blue Persuasion".

== Early life and career ==
Born in Dayton, Ohio, on April 29, 1947, James later moved with his family to Niles, Michigan. He was a child model at the age of four.

== Career ==
=== Tommy James and the Shondells ===
In 1959, at the age of 12, James formed the band the Echoes", which eventually became Tom and the Tornadoes. In 1964, the band changed its name to the Shondells. That same year, Jack Douglas, a local DJ at WNIL radio station in Niles, formed his own record label, Snap Records. The Shondells were one of the local bands he recorded at WNIL Studios. One of the songs was the Jeff Barry and Ellie Greenwich ditty "Hanky Panky", which the pair had recorded under the name the Raindrops. The song was a hit locally, but the label had no resources for national promotion, and it was soon forgotten.

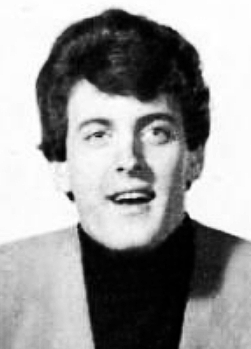
James in 1967

In 1965, a local dance promoter, Bob Mack, found a copy of "Hanky Panky" in a used record bin and started playing it at his Pittsburgh dance clubs. Soon after, a Pittsburgh-area bootlegger made a copy of the song and began pressing copies of it, speeding it up slightly in the process. Sales of the bootleg were estimated at 80,000 in 10 days. It became a number-one on Pittsburgh radio stations in early 1966. Douglas heard about the record's sudden popularity in Pittsburgh because his name and contact information appeared on Snap Records labels. Numerous calls from Pittsburgh convinced James to go to Pennsylvania, where he met Mack and Chuck Rubin, who handled the talent bookings for Mack's dance clubs. Before long, all three major music trade papers, Billboard, Cashbox, and Record World, were listing "Hanky Panky" as a regional breakout hit. Rubin, who had music-industry connections, said it was a good time for the trio to travel to New York City in search of a record deal.

The band made the rounds of the major recording labels, getting initial potential offers from most companies they visited. One label, Roulette Records, gave no initial response because its head, Morris Levy, was out of town until that evening; Roulette was one of the last stops on their visit. By the next morning, Mack, Rubin, and James were now receiving polite refusals from the major record companies after the enthusiasm for the record the day before. James said, "We didn't know what in the world was going on, and finally Jerry Wexler over at Atlantic leveled with us and said, 'Look, Morris Levy and Roulette called up all the other record companies and said, "This is my freakin' record." (laughs) and scared 'em all away – even the big corporate labels.'" Their only option would be to sign with Roulette.

Since the band had broken up two years before, James was the only Shondell left. Mack made his dance-club bands available to James, but nothing seemed to fit until one of the bands' guitarists took James to the Thunderbird Lounge in Greensburg, Pennsylvania. James sang with the house band, the Raconteurs. The Raconteurs became the new Shondells, and Jackson acquired the professional name of Tommy James. By the third week of June 1966, "Hanky Panky" had become the top single at WLS. By the third week of July 1966, "Hanky Panky" had become the top single in the United States.

After a few comings and goings of members, the classic lineup of James, Eddie Gray (guitar), Mike Vale (bass), Ron Rosman (keyboards), and Pete Lucia (drums) was formed. The group recorded a follow-up song to "Hanky Panky". When Bob Mack's attempt at finding some Shondells worked out in an inadvertent way, he told James about another record he found in the same used record bin "Hanky Panky" came from: "Say I Am" by Jimmy Gilmer and the Fireballs. The only thing James and his new Shondells were aware of when they entered the recording studio for the first time is that whatever they recorded should sound similar to "Hanky Panky", although the two songs sound nothing alike. Mack played the Fireballs record for the group, and they decided to record their version of the song. Mack was credited as the producer for the group's first album, Hanky Panky.

Songwriter Richie Cordell wrote (or co-wrote) and produced many of the group's hits, among them "I Think We're Alone Now", "Mirage", and "Mony Mony". The creation of "Mony Mony" was a group effort involving Cordell, James, Shondells band member Peter Lucia, producer Bo Gentry, and Bobby Bloom. James and Cordell set out to create a party rock single, working out everything except the song's title, which eluded them even after much effort. When they took a break from their creative endeavors on James' apartment terrace, they looked up at the Mutual of New York Insurance Company's large neon sign bearing the abbreviation for the company: M-O-N-Y, which provided the song's name.

Tommy James and the Shondells also produced a "Mony Mony" video when the song was a hit. Though a number of musical groups had already produced videos by that time, no market at all existed for that film in the U.S. Television stations would not air it, and it was originally shown between double features in movie theaters in Europe. The film was not seen in the U.S. until the creation of MTV.

James was contacted by Beatle George Harrison, who was working with a group called Grapefruit at the time. Harrison and the group had written some songs they wanted James to consider recording. Since the group had made a decision to change their musical style (and would do so with "Crimson and Clover": see below) and the material Harrison and Grapefruit provided was in the style of "Mony Mony", James turned down their offer.

The music business changed after the success of "Mony Mony". Top 40 program formatting, based on 45 rpm single records, drove popular music on the radio. Few stations played cuts from albums, so radio was, in effect, "selling" singles for the record companies. In August 1968, James and the Shondells went on the campaign trail for three months with presidential candidate Vice President Hubert Humphrey. Meanwhile, popular music had become album-driven, displacing many performers whose singles had been top sellers. James realized the Shondells and he needed to become an album-oriented group if they were to survive in the business, necessitating a change in their style.

After working out a marketing strategy for their new sound, James visited WLS when the group was in Chicago to play a concert, bringing along a rough cut of "Crimson and Clover" to the station. WLS secretly recorded the music when James played his tape for them. By the time James was out of the building and in the car, its radio was playing the station's dub of the not-yet-finished song. "Crimson and Clover" had to be pressed the way it was heard on the radio station, and the marketing plan was now wasted time and effort.

"Crimson and Clover" was a huge success, and the group would have two follow-up hits that also reached the Hot 100's top 10, "Sweet Cherry Wine" and "Crystal Blue Persuasion". James, who co-wrote all three of those songs (with Peter Lucia, Richie Grasso, and Eddie Gray and with Mike Vale, respectively), and his band did well enough with the transition to be invited to perform at Woodstock. James describes Artie Kornfeld's invitation like this: "Artie was up and asked if you could play at this pig farm up in upstate New York." I said, "What?!?" "Well, they say it's gonna be a lot of people there, and it's gonna be a really important show." At the time, James was in Hawaii and was incredulous about being asked to travel 6,000 miles to play a show on an upstate New York pig farm, telling the Roulette Records' secretary Karin Grasso, "If I'm not there, start without us, will you please?"

In March 1970, after four more hits, drugs almost killed James, when at a concert, he collapsed and was pronounced dead. He survived, though, and decided to take a break from the recording studio and move to the country to recuperate. The Shondells, without James, recorded two albums under the new group name Hog Heaven (one "self-titled" on Roulette Records in 1970 and the second in 1971 but unreleased until 2008), but disbanded soon afterwards.

In October 2008, James and the three surviving members of the original Shondells (Pete Lucia died in 1987) reunited in a New Jersey studio to record again after 37 years. The group recorded an album, I Love Christmas.

Tommy James and the Shondells were voted into the Michigan Rock and Roll Legends online Hall of Fame in 2006. Four of the band's biggest hits have been voted Legendary Michigan Songs: "Crimson & Clover" in 2010, and "Hanky Panky", "I Think We're Alone Now", and "Mony Mony" in 2011.

=== Solo career ===
James recorded the Tony Romeo composition, "Indian Lake", which found its way onto a PPX release, backed with an Addrisi Brothers composition that had reached number 39 on the Hot 100 for The Association, "Time for Livin'".

Having gone solo in 1970, he released his first two solo albums on Roulette, Tommy James (September 1970) and Christian of the World (August 1971). He had two further Billboard Hot 100 top-20 chart hits with "Draggin' the Line" (co-written by Bob King) (number four in 1971) and "Three Times in Love" (number 19 in 1980), plus 11 much smaller Hot 100 chartings. "Hanky Panky" has been James' one RIAA certified gold single. He also wrote and produced the million-selling 1970 hit "Tighter, Tighter" for the group Alive 'N Kickin' (co-written with Bob King).

When James first met Morris Levy of Roulette Records, Levy evidently was willing to strong-arm others when necessary. While a Roulette artist had great creative control when recording for the company, the lack of payment for those efforts was difficult to take. James estimates the company owed him $30 to $40 million in royalties. Roulette was used as a front for organized crime, also functioning as a money laundering operation, as Levy was closely allied with the Genovese crime family. In the early 1970s, the Genovese outfit found itself in a bloody gang war with the Gambino family, which saw victims not only among mobsters (such as Levy's close friend and business partner Thomas Eboli), but also increasingly among nonmob figures on the periphery of the organizations.

Levy had taken a somewhat fatherly shine to James, and he worried that James might be a target for those who wanted to get at the Genovese family through Levy, so he warned James to flee New York for an extended period until the war was over. In 1971, James settled in Nashville, Tennessee, where the Mafia had little presence or influence. While there, he recorded an album with top Nashville musicians entitled My Head, My Bed and My Red Guitar (January 1972), which received critical acclaim, but sold poorly. He left Roulette Records in 1974 and two more albums, In Touch (July 1976) and Midnight Rider (January 1978), followed on Fantasy Records, with yet another, Three Times in Love, appearing on Millennium Records in late 1979. The independent label Aegis Records put out his Hi-Fi album in the summer of 1990.

To date, over 300 musicians have recorded versions of James' music. Covers of three of James' songs went top 10 on the Hot 100 (the last two as consecutive number ones) in the 1980s: Joan Jett with "Crimson and Clover", Tiffany with "I Think We're Alone Now", and Billy Idol with "Mony Mony".

=== Other endeavors ===
In February 2010, James published an autobiography entitled Me, the Mob, and the Music. James announced that deals were in hand to turn the story into both a film and a Broadway play. Barbara De Fina was said to be producing the film. James did not feel comfortable writing his book until all those deeply involved with the record company had died. After Roulette Records and Levy's Big Seven Music publishing company were sold (the record company to an EMI and Rhino Records partnership, the music publishing company to Windswept Pacific Music, which was later sold to EMI), James began to receive large royalty checks from sales of his records.

In February 2018, James became host of weekly radio program Gettin Together with Tommy James on Sirius XM Radio channel 73, 60s Gold.

James can also be seen on late-night informercials selling collections of music from the Woodstock era for Time Life.

== Personal life ==
James moved to Clifton, New Jersey in the mid-1970s and around 2000 to nearby Cedar Grove. He has been married three times and has one child. On February 23, 2022, his wife Lynda died after a prolonged illness.

James married his long-time manager Carol Ross on April 5, 2025.

== Solo discography ==
=== Studio albums ===
Year	Album	US 200	Record label
1970	Tommy James	—	Roulette Records
1971	Christian of the World	131	Roulette Records
1971	My Head, My Bed & My Red Guitar	—	Roulette Records
1976	In Touch	—	Fantasy Records
1977	Midnight Rider	—	Fantasy Records
1979	Three Times in Love	134	Millennium Records
1990	Hi-Fi	—	Aegis Records
2006	Hold the Fire	—	
2008	I Love Christmas	—	
2019	Alive	—	
"—" denotes releases that did not chart.

=== Live albums ===
Year	Album	Record label
1996	Greatest Hits Live!	Aura Records
2021	Rock Party	Aura Records

=== Compilations ===
Year	Album	US 200	Record label
1991	The Solo Years • 1970-1981	—	Rhino Records
1993	Discography: Deals & Demos 1974-1992	—	Aura Records
"—" denotes releases that did not chart.			Aura Records

=== Singles ===
Year	Title	Peak chart positions				Record label	B-side	Album
Year	Title	US	US AC	AUS	CAN	Record label	B-side	Album
1970	"Ball and Chain"	57	—	—	44	Roulette Records	"Candy Maker"	Tommy James
1970	"Church Street Soul Revival"	62	—	—	55	Roulette Records	"Draggin' the Line"	Christian of the World
1971	"Adrienne"	93	—	—	—	Roulette Records	"Light of Day"	Christian of the World
1971	"Draggin' the Line"	4	6	20	2	Roulette Records	"Bits and Pieces"	Christian of the World
1971	"I'm Comin' Home"	40	—	—	19	Roulette Records	"Sing, Sing, Sing"	Christian of the World
1971	"Nothing to Hide"	41	—	—	35	Roulette Records	"Walk a Country Mile"	My Head, My Bed, and My Red Guitar
1972	"Tell 'Em Willie Boy's A'Comin'"	89	—	—	89	Roulette Records	"Forty Days and Forty Nights"	My Head, My Bed, and My Red Guitar
1972	"Cat's Eye in the Window"	90	—	—	85	Roulette Records	"Dark is the Night"	Non-album singles
1972	"Love Song"	67	40	—	51	Roulette Records	"Kingston Highway"	Non-album singles
1972	"Celebration"	95	—	—	—	Roulette Records	"The Last One to Know"	Non-album singles
1973	"Boo, Boo, Don't'cha Be Blue"	70	—	—	68	Roulette Records	"Rings and Things"	Non-album singles
1973	"Calico"	—	—	—	—	Roulette Records	"Hey, My Lady"	Non-album single
1974	"Glory, Glory"	—	—	—	—	MCA Records	"Comin' Down"	Non-album single
1976	"Tighter, Tighter"	—	—	—	—	Fantasy Records	"Comin' Down"	In Touch
1976	"I Love You Love Me Love"	—	—	—	—	Fantasy Records	"Devil Gate Drive"	In Touch
1977	"Love is Gonna Find a Way"	—	—	—	—	Fantasy Records	"I Don't Love You Anymore"	Midnight Rider
1979	"Three Times in Love"	19	1	—	64	Millennium Records	"I Just Wanna Play the Music"	Three Times in Love
1980	"You Got Me"	101	—	—	—	Millennium Records	"It's All Right (For Now)"	Three Times in Love
1981	"You're So Easy to Love"	58	—	—	—	Millennium Records	"Halfway to Heaven"	Non-album singles
1983	"Say Please"	—	—	—	—	21 Records	"Two Time Lover"	Non-album singles
1990	"You Take My Breath Away"	—	—	—	—	AEGIS	"Heartbeat in the Night"	Hi-Fi
1990	"Go"	—	—	—	—	AEGIS	"Backtrack"	Hi-Fi
2006	"Love Words"	—	40	—	—	Aura Records	N/A	Hold the Fire
2019	"So Beautiful"	—	29	—	—	Aura Records	N/A	Alive
2019	"I Think We're Alone Now" (acoustic)	—	27	—	—	Aura Records	N/A	Alive
"—" denotes releases that did not chart or were not released in that territory.

== Bibliography ==
- James, Tommy; Martin Fitzpatrick (2010). Me, the mob, and the music: one helluva ride with Tommy James and the Shondells. New York: Scribner. ISBN 978-1-4391-2865-7. The book extensively details James's relationship with Morris Levy.
