= Joan Jett discography =

Cataloging of published recordings by Joan Jett

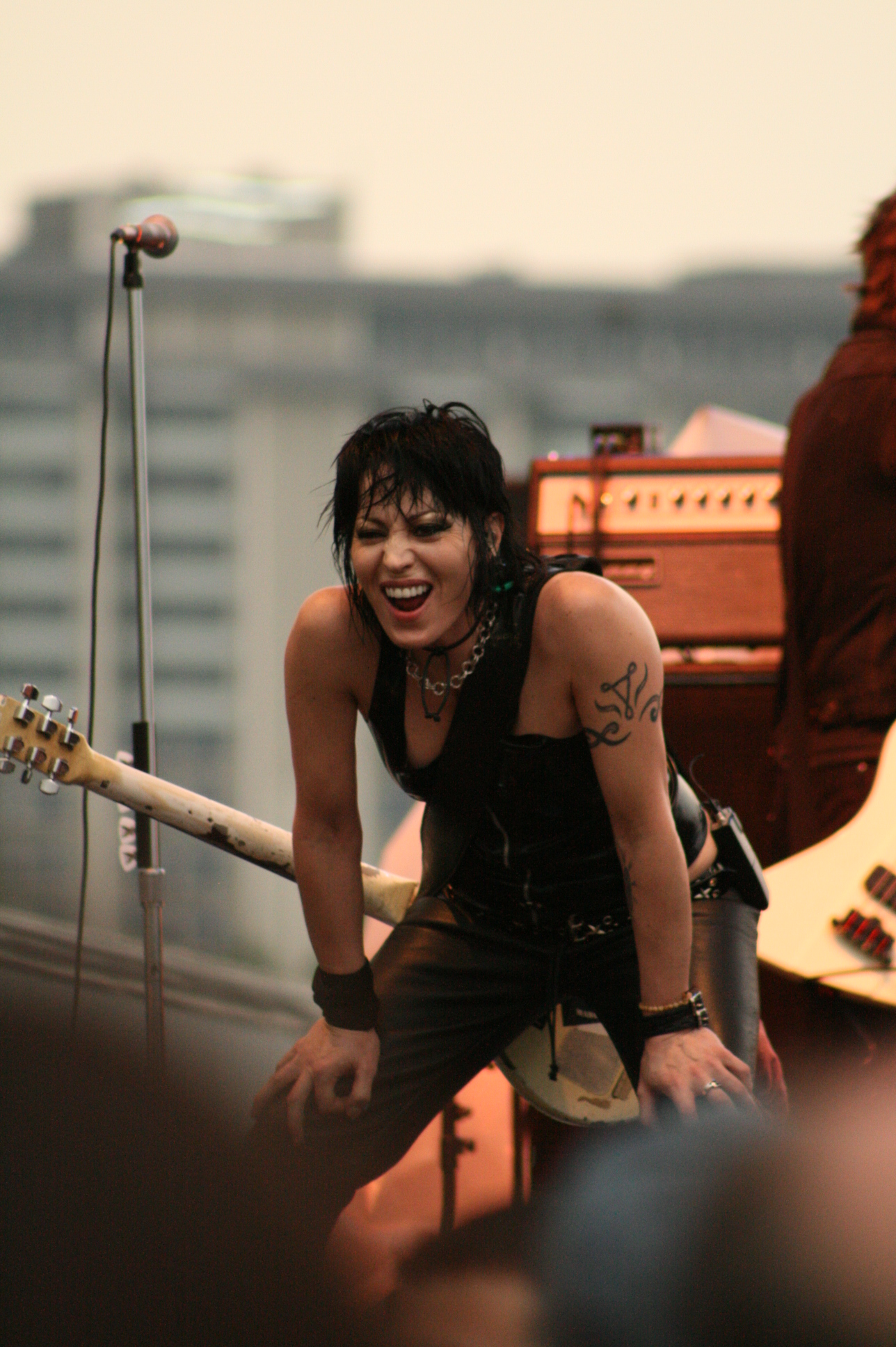
- Jett performing in 2008
- Studio albums: 13
- Extended plays: 7
- Compilation albums: 8
- Singles: 46
- Music videos: 30

The discography of American singer, songwriter, guitarist, businesswoman, and actress Joan Jett, includes 44 singles and 12 studio albums.

As a part of Joan Jett and the Blackhearts, her most successful release is 1981's I Love Rock 'n Roll. The album reached number 2 on the U.S. Billboard 200 chart and was certified Platinum in the United States and 2× Platinum in Canada. This album spawned two top-10 singles on the Billboard Hot 100, the highest being "I Love Rock 'n' Roll", which reached the top of the chart in 1982. It was then followed by "Crimson and Clover", which reached number 7 on the Billboard Hot 100 and number 60 on the UK charts. Two additional singles were issued, however, neither of which charted. "Do You Wanna Touch Me (Oh Yeah)" off Bad Reputation reached number 20 on Billboard's Hot 100 chart.

After releasing three additional albums between 1983 and 1986, Jett returned with the album Up Your Alley, in 1988. It was a Top 20 album on the Billboard 200, and was her second (and final) Platinum certified album in the United States. The album featured the Top 10 single "I Hate Myself for Loving You". After the release of The Hit List in 1990, Jett charted again at number 47 on Billboard with the release of Unvarnished in 2013. However, she released a string of compilation albums throughout the 1990s, and released seven more studio albums, the most recent being the acoustic album, Changeup, in 2022.

Jett also co-wrote "House of Fire" in 1989 with Desmond Child and Alice Cooper, which was released on the 1989 album Trash. The single for the song was first released in the UK in late 1989, where it peaked at number 65. It was then released in the US in early 1990 reaching number 56 on the Billboard Hot 100 and number 39 on the Mainstream Rock Tracks chart.

Her cover of "Love Is All Around" (the theme song of The Mary Tyler Moore Show) was used by the NCAA to promote the Women's Final Four, as well as the song "Unfinished Business", which was never commercially released. "Love Is All Around" went into radio play and became the number one requested song without an existing (support) CD.

== Albums ==
=== Studio albums ===
Title	Album details	Peak chart positions							Certifications (sales threshold)
Title	Album details	US	AUS	AUT	NOR	NZ	SWE	UK	Certifications (sales threshold)
Bad Reputation	First studio album, original title Joan Jett; Recorded as Joan Jett; Release date: May 17, 1980; re-release January 23, 1981; Label: Blackheart; re-release Boardwalk	51	45	—	—	—	—	—	
I Love Rock 'n Roll	Second studio album; Recorded as Joan Jett and the Blackhearts; Release date: November 23, 1981; Label: Boardwalk	2	10	14	38	1	4	25	RIAA: Platinum; AUS: Platinum; MC: 2× Platinum
Album	Third studio album; Recorded as Joan Jett and the Blackhearts; Release date: 1983; Label: Blackheart/MCA	20	85	—	19	—	29	—	RIAA: Gold
Glorious Results of a Misspent Youth	Fourth studio album; Recorded as Joan Jett and the Blackhearts; Release date: October 1, 1984; Label: Blackheart/MCA	67	—	—	—	—	—	—	
Good Music	Fifth studio album; Recorded as Joan Jett and the Blackhearts; Release date: December 9, 1986; Label: Blackheart/CBS	105	—	—	—	—	—	—	
Up Your Alley	Sixth studio album; Recorded as Joan Jett and the Blackhearts; Release date: May 23, 1988; Label: Blackheart/CBS	19	—	—	—	31	16	—	RIAA: Platinum; MC: Gold
The Hit List	Seventh studio album; Recorded as Joan Jett; Release date: January 16, 1990; Label: Blackheart/CBS	36	88	—	—	16	22	—	
Notorious	Eighth studio album; Recorded as Joan Jett and the Blackhearts; Release date: August 20, 1991; Label: Blackheart/CBS	—	—	—	—	—	—	—	
Pure and Simple	Ninth studio album; Recorded as Joan Jett and the Blackhearts; Release date: June 14, 1994; Label: Warner Bros.	—	142	—	—	—	—	—	
Naked	Tenth studio album; Recorded as Joan Jett and the Blackhearts; Release date: April 27, 2004; Released only in Japan; Label: Blackheart	—	—	—	—	—	—	—	
Sinner	Eleventh studio album; Recorded as Joan Jett and the Blackhearts; Release date: June 13, 2006; Label: Blackheart	—	—	—	—	—	—	56	
Unvarnished	Twelfth studio album; Recorded as Joan Jett and the Blackhearts; Released: September 30, 2013; Label: Blackheart	47	102	—	—	—	—	—	
Changeup	Thirteenth studio album; First acoustic album; Recorded as Joan Jett and the Blackhearts; Release date: March 25, 2022; Label: Blackheart	—	—	—	—	—	—	—	
"—" denotes releases that did not chart

=== Compilation albums ===
Title	Album details
Do You Wanna Touch Me?	Release date: 1993; Label: Blackheart
Flashback	Release date: November 15, 1993; Label: Blackheart
Great Hits	Release date: 1996; Label: Blackheart
Fit to Be Tied	Release date: November 18, 1997; Label: Blackheart/Mercury
Fetish	Release date: June 8, 1999; Label: Blackheart
USA	Release date; 2002; Label: BMG
Jett Rock	Release date: 2003; Label: Blackheart
Greatest Hits	Release date: March 9, 2010; Label: Blackheart
Bad Reputation (Music from the Original Motion Picture)	Release date: September 28, 2018; Label: Legacy

== Extended plays ==
Title	EP details
I Love Rock 'n' Roll 92	First public release extended play; Recorded as Joan Jett and the Blackhearts; Release date: 1992; Released only in Japan; Label: Self-released
1979	Recorded as Joan Jett; Fan club only extended play; Release date: 1995; Label: Self-released
Cherry Bomb	Recorded as Joan Jett and the Blackhearts; Fan club only extended play; Release date: 1995; Label: Self-released
Unfinished Business	Recorded as Joan Jett; Fan club only extended play; Release date: 2001; Label: Self-released
A.C.D.C. EP	Recorded as Joan Jett and the Blackhearts; Promotional release; Release date: 2006; Label: Blackheart
Recorded & Booked	Recorded as Joan Jett and the Blackhearts; Record Store Day limited edition 7" with book; Release date: November 28, 2014; Label: Blackheart
The First Sessions	Recorded as Joan Jett; Digital and 12" re-release of 1979; Release date: 2015; Label: Blackheart
Mindsets	Recorded as Joan Jett and the Blackhearts; 6 song EP of new material; Release date: 2023; Label: Blackheart

== Singles ==
Year	Title	Peak chart positions										Album
Year	Title	US	US Rock	AUS	AUT	CAN	GER	NZ	SWE	SWI	UK	Album
1979	"You Don't Own Me" / "I Love Rock 'n Roll"	—	—	—	—	—	—	—	—	—	—	Bad Reputation
1980	"Make Believe" b/w "Call Me Lightning" (non-album track)	—	—	—	—	—	—	—	—	—	—	Bad Reputation
1980	"You Don't Know What You've Got"	—	—	—	—	—	—	—	—	—	—	Bad Reputation
1981	"Jezebel" / "Bad Reputation"	—	48	—	—	—	—	—	—	—	—	Bad Reputation
1982	"I Love Rock 'n Roll"	1	1	1	4	1	6	1	1	3	4	I Love Rock 'n' Roll
1982	"Crimson and Clover"	7	6	6	12	4	19	11	—	8	60	I Love Rock 'n' Roll
1982	"Do You Wanna Touch Me (Oh Yeah)"	20	21	18	19	8	31	12	—	12	—	Bad Reputation
1982	"Nag"	—	—	—	—	—	—	—	—	—	—	I Love Rock 'n' Roll
1982	"Victim of Circumstance"	—	—	—	—	—	—	—	—	—	—	I Love Rock 'n' Roll
1982	"Summertime Blues"	—	24	—	—	—	—	—	—	—	—	non-album song
1983	"Everyday People"	37 (Note: "Everyday People" also charted on the Hot Dance/Disco Club Play chart, peaking at #43.)	—	96	—	—	—	—	—	—	—	Album
1983	"Fake Friends" b/w "Nitetime" (non-album track)	35	18	82	—	—	—	—	—	—	—	Album
1983	"The French Song"	—	30	—	—	42	—	—	—	—	—	Album
1983	"Handyman"	—	—	—	—	—	—	—	—	—	—	Album
1984	"I Need Someone"	—	—	—	—	—	—	—	—	—	—	Glorious Results of a Misspent Youth
1984	"I Love You Love Me Love"	— (Note: "I Love You Love Me Love" did not enter the Billboard Hot 100, but peaked at #5 on the Bubbling Under Hot 100 Singles chart.)	—	—	—	—	—	—	—	—	—	Glorious Results of a Misspent Youth
1984	"Cherry Bomb"	— (Note: "Cherry Bomb" did not enter the Billboard Hot 100, but peaked at #55 on the Hot Dance/Disco Club Play chart.)	—	—	—	—	—	—	—	—	—	Glorious Results of a Misspent Youth
1986	"Good Music" b/w "Fantasy" (non-album track)	83	—	77	—	—	—	46	—	—	—	Good Music
1986	"Roadrunner"	—	46	—	—	—	—	—	—	—	—	Good Music
1987	"Light of Day" (credited as The Barbusters)	33	13	—	—	—	—	—	—	—	—	Light of Day soundtrack
1988	"I Hate Myself for Loving You"	8	20	—	—	21	—	8	12	—	46	Up Your Alley
1988	"Little Liar" b/w "What Can I Do for You" (non-album track)	19	13	164	—	—	—	35	—	—	—	Up Your Alley
1990	"Dirty Deeds"	36	23	59	—	81	—	14	—	—	69	The Hit List
1990	"Love Hurts"	—	—	—	—	—	—	—	—	—	100	The Hit List
1990	"Have You Ever Seen the Rain?"	—	—	—	—	—	—	—	—	—	—	The Hit List
1991	"Backlash"	—	40 (Note: "Backlash" also charted on the Modern Rock Tracks chart, peaking at #7.)	—	—	—	—	—	—	—	—	Notorious
1991	"Don't Surrender"	—	—	—	—	—	—	—	—	—	—	Notorious
1991	"Treadin' Water"	—	—	—	—	—	—	—	—	—	—	Notorious
1991	"The Only Good Thing You Ever Said Was Goodbye"	—	—	—	—	—	—	—	—	—	—	Notorious
1994	"I Love Rock 'n Roll" (re-release)	—	—	147	—	—	—	—	—	13	75	I Love Rock 'n Roll 92
1994	"Spinster"	—	—	—	—	—	—	—	—	—	—	Pure and Simple
1994	"As I Am"	—	—	—	—	—	—	—	—	—	—	Pure and Simple
1994	"Eye to Eye"	—	—	—	—	—	—	—	—	—	—	Pure and Simple
1995	"Bob (Cousin O.)" (with the Gits)	—	—	—	—	—	—	—	—	—	—	Evil Stig
1995	"Let's Do It" (with Paul Westerberg)	—	—	—	—	—	—	—	—	—	—	Tank Girl soundtrack
1996	"Love Is All Around"	— (Note: "Love Is All Around" did not enter the Billboard Hot 100, but peaked at #8 on the Bubbling Under Hot 100 Singles chart.)	—	—	—	—	—	—	—	—	—	Great Hits
1999	"Fetish"	—	—	—	—	—	—	—	—	—	—	Fetish
2002	"The Word"	—	—	—	—	—	—	—	—	—	—	It's About Eve
2006	"A.C.D.C."	—	—	—	—	—	—	—	—	—	—	Sinner
2006	"Change the World"	—	—	—	—	—	—	—	—	—	—	Sinner
2007	"Androgynous"	—	—	—	—	—	—	—	—	—	—	Sinner
2013	"Any Weather"	—	—	—	—	—	—	—	—	—	—	Unvarnished
2018	"Fresh Start"	—	—	—	—	—	—	—	—	—	—	Bad Reputation (Music from the Original Motion Picture)
2022	"(I'm Gonna) Run Away" (acoustic)	— (Note: "(I'm Gonna) Run Away" did not enter the Billboard Hot 100, but peaked at #20 on the Adult Contemporary chart and #38 on the Adult Pop Airplay chart.)	—	—	—	—	—	—	—	—	—	Changeup
2022	"Long Time" (acoustic)	— (Note: "Long Time (Acoustic)" did not enter the Billboard Hot 100, but peaked at #27 on the Adult Pop Airplay chart.)	—	—	—	—	—	—	—	—	—	Changeup
2023	"If You're Blue"	— (Note: "If You're Blue" did not enter the Billboard Hot 100, but peaked at #32 on the Adult Pop Airplay chart.)	—	—	—	—	—	—	—	—	—	Mindsets
"—" denotes the single failed to chart, or not released.

== Other appearances ==
=== Studio ===
Year	Song(s)	Album	Notes
1985	"Gotcha Where I Want Ya"	Gotcha!	with the Blackhearts
1987	"Light of Day"*, "This Means War"*, "It's All Coming Down Tonight"*, and "Rabbit's Got the Gun"**	Light of Day	with the Blackhearts (*as The Barbusters and **as Joan Jett and the Hunzz)
1987	"She Lost You"	Less than Zero (soundtrack)	The Zephyrs cover, with the Blackhearts
1990	"Long Live the Night"	Days of Thunder	with the Blackhearts
1995	"Let's Do It"	Tank Girl	Cole Porter cover, with Paul Westerberg
1996	"Love Stinks"	Mr. Wrong	The J. Geils Band cover, with the Blackhearts
1997	"Real Wild Child (Wild One)"	We Will Fall: The Iggy Pop Tribute	Johnny O'Keefe cover, with the Blackhearts
2002	"The Word"	It's About Eve	The Beatles cover
2009	"Destination Unknown"	Endless Bummer	Missing Persons cover, with the Blackhearts
2015	"Miss You Already"	Miss You Already	with the Blackhearts
2018	"Fresh Start"	Bad Reputation	original song for the documentary on Jett's life, with the Blackhearts

=== Guest ===
Year	Artist	Album
1980	Sean Tyla	Just Popped Out
1998	Bikini Kill	The Singles
1999	Marky Ramone and the Intruders	The Answer to Your Problems?
2005	The Eyeliners	No Apologies
2006	Peaches	Impeach My Bush
2006	Heart Attack	Hellbound and Heartless
2014	Foo Fighters	Sonic Highways
2017	Blondie	Pollinator
2020	Miley Cyrus	Plastic Hearts
2021	Wanda Jackson	Encore
2023	Dolly Parton	Rockstar

=== Music videos ===
Year	Title
1980	"Bad Reputation"
1980	"Do You Wanna Touch Me"
1981	"I Love Rock 'n' Roll"
1981	"Crimson and Clover"
1983	"Fake Friends"
1983	"The French Song"
1983	"Everyday People"
1984	"Cherry Bomb"
1984	"I Love You Love Me Love"
1984	"I Need Someone"
1986	"Good Music"
1987	"Light of Day"
1988	"I Hate Myself for Loving You"
1988	"Little Liar"
1990	"Dirty Deeds"
1990	"Love Hurts"
1990	"Have You Ever Seen the Rain?"
1991	"Backlash"
1991	"Don't Surrender"
1993	"I Love Rock 'N Roll" (re-release)
1994	"Go Home"
1994	"As I Am"
1994	"Eye to Eye"
1997	"Real Wild Child"
2005	"Destroy"
2006	"Change the World"
2006	"A.C.D.C."
2007	"Androgynous"
2013	"Any Weather"
2017	"Doom or Destiny" (with Blondie)
2021	"Two Shots" (with Wanda Jackson)

== See also ==
- Evil Stig, 1995 studio album from a band formed by Joan Jett and members of the Gits
