= Greatest Hits (Joan Jett and the Blackhearts album) =

Greatest hits album by Joan Jett and the Blackhearts
- Released: March 9, 2010
- Recorded: 1979–2009
- Genre: Hard rock, punk rock, power pop
- Length: 66:13
- Label: Blackheart
- Producer: Kenny Laguna; Ritchie Cordell; Joan Jett; Jimmy Iovine; Desmond Child; Ted Templeman; Carianne Brinkman

Joan Jett and the Blackhearts chronology
Sinner (2006)	Greatest Hits (2010)	Unvarnished (2013)

Professional ratings
Review scores
Source	Rating
AllMusic	3.5/5 stars

Greatest Hits is a compilation album by the rock group Joan Jett and the Blackhearts, released March 9, 2010 through Jett's label Blackheart Records. It includes two discs of 21 songs in total and features Jett's three songs that charted in the US top ten: "I Love Rock 'n' Roll", "Crimson and Clover", and "I Hate Myself for Loving You". In 2013, the album was released in Australia featuring two new songs ("TMI" and "Reality Mentality") added to the end of the second disc, which were later included on Unvarnished. A new version of "I Love Playin' with Fire" (originally by Jett's former band The Runaways) was appended as an iTunes Store and Japanese bonus track.

A single disc budget version was released in 2019 on Blackheart/Sony Legacy containing 12 songs.

== Track listing ==
Disc one
No.	Title	Writer(s)	From the album	Length
1.	"Cherry Bomb" (The Runaways cover)	Joan Jett, Kim Fowley	Glorious Results of a Misspent Youth, 1984	2:33
2.	"You Drive Me Wild" (The Runaways cover, new recording, 2009)	Jett		3:52
3.	"School Days" (The Runaways cover, new recording, 2009)	Jett, Fowley		3:02
4.	"Love Is Pain" (re-recording, 2009)	Jett, Kenny Laguna	original version on I Love Rock 'n Roll, 1981	3:29
5.	"Bad Reputation"	Jett, Laguna, Ritchie Cordell, Marty Joe Kupersmith	Bad Reputation, 1980	2:47
6.	"You Don't Know What You've Got"	Jett, Laguna, Cordell	Bad Reputation	3:42
7.	"I Want You" (original version)	Jett, Laguna, Cordell	1979 EP, 1995 (recorded in 1979)	2:42
8.	"I Love Rock 'n' Roll" (The Arrows cover)	Alan Merrill, Jake Hooker	I Love Rock 'n Roll	2:55
9.	"(I'm Gonna) Run Away"	Jett, Laguna	I Love Rock 'n Roll	2:28
10.	"Crimson and Clover" (Tommy James and the Shondells cover)	Tommy James, Peter Lucia jr.	I Love Rock 'n Roll	3:16

Disc two
No.	Title	Writer(s)	From the album	Length
1.	"Do You Wanna Touch Me (Oh Yeah)" (Gary Glitter cover)	Gary Glitter, Mike Leander	Bad Reputation	3:43
2.	"The French Song"	Jett, Laguna, Ricky Byrd, Mike Winter Jr.	Album, 1983	3:35
3.	"Everyday People" (Sly & the Family Stone cover)	Sly Stone	Album	2:39
4.	"Fake Friends"	Jett, Laguna	Album	3:16
5.	"Light of Day"	Bruce Springsteen	Light of Day soundtrack, 1987	3:31
6.	"I Hate Myself for Loving You"	Jett, Desmond Child	Up Your Alley, 1988	4:07
7.	"Backlash"	Jett, Laguna, Paul Westerberg	Notorious, 1991	3:29
8.	"Activity Grrrl"	Jett, Laguna	Pure and Simple, 1994	3:27
9.	"Love Is All Around" (Sonny Curtis cover)	Sonny Curtis	Great Hits, 1997	1:00
10.	"Androgynous" (The Replacements cover)	Westerberg	Naked, 2004	3:08
11.	"A.C.D.C." (Sweet cover)	Nicky Chinn, Mike Chapman	Sinner, 2006	3:24

== Charts ==
Chart (2010)	Peak position
Swedish Albums (Sverigetopplistan)	33
US Billboard 200	141
US Independent Albums (Billboard)	17
US Top Rock Albums (Billboard)	42
