= Bad Reputation (2018 film) =

- Directed by: Kevin Kerslake
- Written by: Joel Marcus
- Produced by: Peter Afterman; Carianne Brinkman
- Starring: Joan Jett; Kenny Laguna
- Cinematography: Kevin Kerslake; Greg Olliver
- Edited by: Joel Marcus
- Music by: The Runaways; Joan Jett and the Blackhearts
- Production companies: BMG; Blackheart Films; Inaudible Films; Submarine
- Distributed by: Magnolia Pictures
- Release date: 28 September 2018
- Running time: 93 minutes
- Country: United States
- Language: English
- Box office: $148,568

Bad Reputation is a 2018 American documentary film about the career of rock musician Joan Jett, directed by Kevin Kerslake and written by Joel Marcus. The documentary traces Jett's musical career from the formation of the Runaways through her subsequent partnership with songwriter and producer Kenny Laguna. Continuing with the creation of the band Joan Jett and the Blackhearts as well as the establishment of the record label Blackheart Records with Laguna, the narrative concludes with the induction of Joan Jett and the Blackhearts into the Rock and Roll Hall of Fame's Class of 2015.

== Release ==
The film had its world premiere at the Sundance Film Festival on January 22, 2018. The general release to theaters was made on September 28, 2018.

== Interviewees ==
- Joan Jett
- Evelyn McDonnell, author of Queens of Noise: The Real Story of the Runaways
- Don Bolles of the Germs
- Rodney Bingenheimer, DJ
- Iggy Pop
- Cherie Currie of the Runaways
- Chris Stein of Blondie
- Debbie Harry of Blondie
- Billie Joe Armstrong of Green Day
- Annie Larkin, Joan Jett's sister
- Toby Mamis, manager of the Runaways, 1977–1979
- Kenny Laguna
- Meryl Laguna, Kenny Laguna's wife
- Bill Curbishley, manager of The Who
- Kathleen Hanna of Bikini Kill
- Adam Horovitz of Beastie Boys
- Ian MacKaye of Fugazi
- Pete Townshend of the Who
- Gary Ryan, bassist with the Blackhearts
- Eric Ambel, guitarist with the Blackhearts
- Mike Ness of Social Distortion
- Thom Panunzio, music producer and engineer
- Elliot Saltzman, Blackhearts tour manager, 1980–2006
- Miley Cyrus
- Alison Mosshart of the Kills
- Michael J. Fox, co-star in the 1987 film Light of Day
- Thommy Price, drummer with Blackhearts
- Kevin Byrnes, retired U.S. Army General
- Dougie Needles, guitar player with the Blackhearts
- Carianne Brinkman, Blackheart Records executive and Kenny Laguna's daughter
- Laura Jane Grace of the band Against Me!
- Phanie Diaz of FEA
- Nikki Haley, former U.S. Ambassador to the United Nations
- Shepard Fairey, artist and activist
- Gene Baur, co-founder of Farm Sanctuary
- Michelle Cho, animal rights activist
- Kristen Stewart, actress in the 2010 film the Runaways

== Soundtrack ==
Bad Reputation (Music from the Original Motion Picture)

Soundtrack album by Joan Jett and the Blackhearts
- Released: September 28, 2018
- Genres: Hard rock, punk rock, power pop
- Label: Blackheart

Professional ratings
Review scores
Source	Rating
Tom Hull – on the Web	A−
Vice (Expert Witness)	A−

A companion soundtrack was released the same day as the film on Legacy Recordings with 17 tracks from throughout Jett's career.

=== Track listing ===
Bad Reputation (Music from the Original Motion Picture)
No.	Title	Writer(s)	Performer(s)	Length
1.	"Fresh Start"	Joan Jett, Douglas Cangialosi	Joan Jett and the Blackhearts	3:36
2.	"Bad Reputation"	Jett, Kenny Laguna, Ritchie Cordell, Marty Joe Kupersmith	Joan Jett	2:47
3.	"Rebel, Rebel"	David Bowie	Joan Jett and The Blackhearts	4:10
4.	"Cherry Bomb"	Jett, Kim Fowley	The Runaways	2:17
5.	"Wasted"	Jett, Fowley	The Runaways	3:25
6.	"Love Is Pain"	Jett, Laguna	Joan Jett and The Blackhearts	3:29
7.	"Do You Wanna Touch Me (Oh Yeah)"	Gary Glitter, Mike Leander	Joan Jett	3:43
8.	"I Love Rock ’N Roll"	Alan Merrill, Jake Hooker	Joan Jett with Steve Jones & Paul Cook	2:58
9.	"Victim of Circumstance"	Jett, Laguna	Joan Jett and The Blackhearts	2:53
10.	"I Hate Myself for Loving You"	Jett, Desmond Child	Joan Jett and The Blackhearts	4:07
11.	"Crimson and Clover"	Tommy James, Peter Lucia	Joan Jett and The Blackhearts	3:16
12.	"Rebel Girl"	Kathleen Hanna, Billy Karren, Kathi Wilcox, Tobi Vail	Bikini Kill	2:36
13.	"I Wanna Be Your Dog"	Dave Alexander, James Osterberg, Ron Asheton, Scott Asheton	Joan Jett and The Blackhearts	5:10
14.	"Fetish"	Jett	Joan Jett and The Blackhearts	3:22
15.	"Change the World"	Jett, Laguna, Bill Ciprian	Joan Jett and The Blackhearts	3:07
16.	"Feminazi"	Aaron Magana, Jennifer Alva, Leticia Martinez, Stephanie Diaz	Fea	2:15
17.	"Androgynous"	Paul Westerberg	Joan Jett, Miley Cyrus, and Laura Jane Grace (Note: With Stacy Jones (Drums), Vashon Johnson (Bass), Jamie Arentzen (Guitar), Jaco Caraco (Mandolin), and Mike Schmid (Piano))	3:11

Streaming edition
No.	Title	Writer(s)	Performer(s)	Length
18.	"Smells Like Teen Spirit (Live)"	Kurt Cobain, Krist Novoselic, Dave Grohl	Nirvana with Joan Jett	5:19

==== Vinyl edition ====
Side A
No.	Title	Length
1.	"Fresh Start"	3:36
2.	"Bad Reputation"	2:47
3.	"Cherry Bomb" (The Runaways)	2:17
4.	"Love Is Pain"	3:29
5.	"I Love Rock ’N Roll" (Joan Jett with Steve Jones & Paul Cook)	2:58
6.	"Victim of Circumstance"	2:53
7.	"I Hate Myself for Loving You"	4:07

Side B
No.	Title	Length
1.	"Crimson and Clover"	3:16
2.	"Rebel Girl" (Bikini Kill)	2:36
3.	"I Wanna Be Your Dog"	5:10
4.	"Fetish"	3:22
5.	"Feminazi" (Fea)	2:15
6.	"Androgynous" (Joan Jett, Miley Cyrus, and Laura Jane Grace)	3:11

== Reception ==
=== Critical reception ===
Review aggregator Rotten Tomatoes gave the documentary an approval rating of 79% based on 38 reviews and an average score of 6.4/10. The site's critical consensus states, "Bad Reputation offers fans and novices a solidly entertaining overview of Joan Jett's trailblazing career, albeit one that might leave some viewers craving a deeper look." Metacritic, another aggregator, gave the film a score 66 out of 100 based on 15 reviews, indicating "generally favorable" reviews.

=== Accolades ===
Year	Presenter/Festival	Award/Category	Nominee	Status	Ref
2018	Cleveland International Film Festival	Music Movies Competition	Kevin Kerslake	Nominated	
2018	Critics' Choice Documentary Awards	Best Music Documentary	Bad Reputation	Nominated	
2018	Critics' Choice Documentary Awards	Most Compelling Living Subject of a Documentary	Joan Jett	Won	
