= Unvarnished =

Studio album by Joan Jett and the Blackhearts
- Released: September 30, 2013
- Recorded: 2011–2013
- Studios: Germano (New York City); Cloud 9 Recording (Central Islip, New York); Jett House (Long Beach, New York); 606 (Los Angeles); SIR (New York City)
- Genre: Hard rock
- Length: 35:46
- Label: Blackheart
- Producers: Carianne Brinkman; Dave Grohl; Joan Jett; Kenny Laguna; Thom Panunzio

Joan Jett and the Blackhearts chronology
Greatest Hits (2010)	Unvarnished (2013)	Changeup (2022)

Professional ratings
Review scores
Source	Rating
AllMusic	4/5 stars
Creative Loafing Tampa Bay	4/5 stars
Digital Journal	4/5 stars
Paste	7.4/10

Unvarnished is the twelfth studio album by American rock singer Joan Jett and the tenth to feature her backing band the Blackhearts. It was released on September 30, 2013, by Blackheart Records. Unvarnished peaked at No. 47 on the U.S. Billboard 200, becoming Jett's first album to chart there since The Hit List (1990).

== Track listing ==
No.	Title	Writer(s)	Length
1.	"Any Weather" (606 Version)	Joan Jett; Dave Grohl	3:24
2.	"TMI"	Jett; Thommy Price; Dougie Needles; Kenny Laguna	3:49
3.	"Soulmates to Strangers"	Jett; Laura Jane Grace; Laguna	3:12
4.	"Make It Back"	Jett; Needles; Laguna	3:17
5.	"Hard to Grow Up"	Jett; Laguna; Needles	4:21
6.	"Fragile"	Jett	3:39
7.	"Reality Mentality"	Jett	3:05
8.	"Bad as We Can Be"	Jett; Needles; Laguna	3:53
9.	"Different"	Jett; Needles	3:36
10.	"Everybody Needs a Hero"	Laguna; Peter Anders	2:34
Total length:			35:46

Deluxe edition bonus tracks
No.	Title	Writer(s)	Length
10.	"I Know What I Know"	Jett; Laguna	3:18
11.	"Seriously"	Jett; Laguna	3:47
12.	"Different" (Demo Version)		1:42
13.	"Any Weather" (Blackhearts Version)		3:32

Japanese edition bonus tracks
No.	Title	Writer(s)	Length
11.	"I Know What I Know"	Jett; Laguna	3:18
12.	"Any Weather" (Blackhearts Version)		3:32
13.	"Seriously"	Jett; Laguna	3:47
14.	"Any Weather" (SIR version)
15.	"Crimson and Clover" (live)	Tommy James; Peter Lucia

Best Buy exclusive edition bonus tracks
No.	Title	Writer(s)	Length
11.	"Bad Reputation" (live)	Jett; Ritchie Cordell; Laguna; Marty Kupersmith	2:15
12.	"Cherry Bomb" (live)	Jett; Kim Fowley	2:31
13.	"TMI" (live)		3:46
14.	"I Hate Myself for Loving You" (live)	Jett; Desmond Child	6:00

== Personnel ==
Joan Jett and the Blackhearts

- Joan Jett – lead vocals, rhythm guitar
- Dougie Needles – lead guitar, backing vocals
- Acey Slade – bass, backing vocals
- Thommy Price – drums
- Kenny Laguna – keyboards, percussion, melodica, backing vocals

Additional musicians

- Joey Vasta – bass
- Dave Grohl – all instruments on track 1, additional production on track 1
- Jesse Levy – cello on tracks 6 and 10, orchestral arrangements, conductor
- Regis Iandiorio – violin on tracks 6 and 10
- Michael Roth – violin on tracks 6 and 10
- Olivia Koppell – viola on tracks 6 and 10
- Gerard Reuter – oboe and French horn on track 10

Production

- Joan Jett – production
- Kenny Laguna – production
- Thom Panunzio – additional production, engineer, mixing
- Ken Dahlinger – mixing
- John Lousteau – engineer on track 1
- Kenta Yonasaka - additional engineer
- Peter Kuperschmid - additional engineer
- Carianne Brinkman – executive producer

== Charts ==
Chart performance for Unvarnished
Chart (2013)	Peak position
Australian Albums (ARIA)	102
US Billboard 200	47
US Independent Albums (Billboard)	5
US Top Rock Albums (Billboard)	15
