= Fit to Be Tied (album) =

Compilation album by Joan Jett and the Blackhearts
- Released: November 18, 1997
- Recorded: 1980–1995
- Genres: Hard rock; punk rock; power pop
- Length: 47:40
- Labels: Blackheart; Mercury
- Producers: Kenny Laguna; Ritchie Cordell; Thom Panunzio; Jimmy Iovine; Desmond Child; Joan Jett

Joan Jett and the Blackhearts chronology
Pure and Simple (1994)	Fit to Be Tied (1997)	Fetish (1999)

Fit to Be Tied is a compilation CD released by Joan Jett and the Blackhearts. The collection was released in the United States in 1997. It was remastered and reissued in 2001 with slightly different artwork. Rather than secure the rights to the original versions of "I Hate Myself for Loving You" and "Little Liar" from CBS, Jett's label included a demo version and live recording of those songs, respectively.

== Critical reception ==
Professional ratings
Review scores
Source	Rating
AllMusic	4.5/5 stars
Entertainment Weekly	B
Robert Christgau	A
The Rolling Stone Album Guide	3.5/5 stars

AllMusic's Steve Huey gave it four-and-a-half out of five stars and said that, although the alternate versions of "Hate Myself" and "Little Liar" "may bother fans", the album "nearly succeeds" as "the definitive Joan Jett hits package". Citing it as Jett's best album, Robert Christgau felt that the songs "only dip as semiretirement approaches" and gave Fit to be Tied an "A", indicating "a record that rarely flags for more than two or three tracks." However, David Grad of Entertainment Weekly gave the album a "B" and called it "a sadly incomplete career retrospective" marred by "extraneous studio outtakes and a live track". Carla Spartos in The Rolling Stone Album Guide gave it three-and-a-half out of five stars.

== Track listing ==
1. "Bad Reputation" – 2:48
2. "Light of Day" – 3:30
3. "Do You Wanna Touch Me (Oh Yeah)" – 3:44
4. "Roadrunner" (Previously unreleased version) – 3:18
5. "I Love Rock 'n' Roll" – 2:55
6. "Victim of Circumstance" – 2:54
7. "Everyday People" – 2:40
8. "I Hate Myself for Loving You" (Alternate version) – 4:07
9. "Crimson and Clover" – 3:17
10. "Fake Friends" – 3:17
11. "Make Believe" (Alternate intro) – 3:08
12. "Cherry Bomb" – 2:34
13. "Little Liar" (live) – 4:08
14. "World of Denial" – 4:20
15. "Love Is All Around" (Mary Tyler Moore Show Theme) – 1:00
