= Pure and Simple =

Pure and Simple may refer to:

- Pure and Simple (Joan Jett album), 1994
- Pure & Simple (Dolly Parton album), 2016
- "Pure and Simple" (song), a 2001 song by Hear'Say
