= Victim of Circumstance =

Victim of Circumstance may refer to:

- A single by Joan Jett & the Blackhearts from their I Love Rock 'n' Roll album.
- An album by Public Disturbance, a Welsh hard-core punk band.
