= Fit to Be Tied =

Fit to Be Tied may refer to:

- Fit to Be Tied (album), a Joan Jett and the Blackhearts albums
- Fit to Be Tied (film), a 1952 Tom and Jerry short
- "Fit to Be Tied", a song by Quiet Riot from their self-titled album
