= Thom Panunzio =

American record producer

- Born: Thomas R. Panunzio; October 21, 1951 (age 74)
- Occupations: Record producer; recording engineer; mixer
- Years active: Producer 1979–2014; Engineer 1974–present
- Employer: former Geffen Records Executive

Thomas R. Panunzio is an American record producer, audio engineer and mixer.

His career began in 1974 at the Record Plant Studios NYC, working with John Lennon. Later, he became a staff engineer at the Record Plant, and later at The Hit Factory.

Panunzio worked often with Jimmy Iovine, making several records together. Panunzio also worked with Andrew Loog Oldham on The Rolling Stones' Metamorphosis in 1975, and later that year worked with Bruce Springsteen on Born to Run. In 1978, he worked with Patti Smith on Easter, while simultaneously working again with Springsteen on Darkness on the Edge of Town. Panunzio has also produced, engineered and mixed artists including Bob Dylan, U2, Stevie Nicks, Black Sabbath, Ozzy Osbourne, Motörhead, Deep Purple, Aerosmith, The Who, Iggy Pop, Joan Jett, David Bowie, Tom Petty, and Paul Butterfield, among others. Panunzio's experience also includes the making of motion picture soundtracks, such as Road House and Rattle & Hum. Panunzio also worked as the live musical producer for the Farmclub.com series.

Panunzio helped design The Hit Factory studios for the Germano family in New York, as well as A&M Studios (now Henson Recording Studios) in Los Angeles. Later, he helped design the Interscope/ Geffen/ A&M studios where he also created The Thom Thom Club.

In 2003, Panunzio joined Universal Music Group as Executive Senior VP, and Head of A&R for Geffen Records, where he oversaw the careers of Nelly Furtado, Weezer, The Pussycat Dolls, Rise Against and others on the Interscope/Geffen/A&M roster. He also served as the musical producer for all the live music on season 10 of American Idol.

== Selected discography ==
(P) Produced (CP) Co-Produced (EP) Executive Produced (E) Engineered (AE) Assistant Engineered (M) Mixed

Artist	Album	Credit
Aerosmith	Classics Live! (1986–87)	E
Aerosmith	Box of Fire (1994)	E
Agent Orange	Real Live Sound (1991)	P/E/M
Alice Cooper	Classicks (1995)	P
Alice Cooper	A Fistful of Alice (1997)	P/E
Alice Cooper	Freedom for Frankenstein (1998)	P/E
Alice Cooper	The Definitive Alice Cooper (2001)	P
Alice Cooper	Mascara and Monsters (2001)	P
Alice Cooper	Hell Is (2003)	P
Alice Cooper	Live at Cabo Wabo ‘96 (2005)	P/E
Alice in Chains	Singles: Original Motion Picture Soundtrack (1992)	P/E/M
Ayumi Nakamura	Holly Night (1986)	M
The Beat Farmers	Poor and Famous (1989)	P/E/M
Black Sabbath	Reunion	P/E
Block	Lead Me Not into Penn Station (1996)	P/E
Block	Timing Is Everything (1998)	CP/E/M
Blue Öyster Cult	Spectres (1977)	E
Blue Rodeo	Tremolo (1997)	M
Blue Rodeo	Just Like a Vacation (1999)	M
Bob Dylan	Biograph (1985)	M
Bob Seger & the Silver Bullet Band	The Fire Inside (1991)	E
Bob Seger & the Silver Bullet Band	Ultimate Hits: Rock and Roll Never Forgets (2011)	E
Boom Crash Opera	These Here Are Crazy Times (1991)	M
Bruce Springsteen	Born to Run (1975)	E
Bruce Springsteen	Darkness on the Edge of Town (1978)	AE
Bruce Springsteen	"Santa Claus Is Coming to Town" (1984)	E/M
Bruce Springsteen	USA for Africa: We Are The World - "Trapped" (1985)	E/M
Bruce Springsteen	Tracks (1998)	E/M
Bruce Springsteen	Promise: The Darkness on the Edge of Town Story (2010)	E
Carla Olson and The Textones	Midnight Mission (1984)	M
Cell Mates	Between Two Fires (1992)	P
Chocolate Starfish	Box (1995)	M
Circus of Power	Magic & Madness (1993)	P/E
Corey Stevens	The Road to Zen (1997)	M
Corey Stevens	Bring On the Blues (2003)	M
Darlene Love	Paint Another Picture (1988)	E
Dave Koz	Off the Beaten Path (1996)	CP/E/M
Dave Koz	December Makes Me Feel This Way (1997)	P/E/M
Dave Koz	Memories of a Winter's Night (2007)	P/M
Dave Koz	Ultimate Christmas (2011)	P
Deep Purple	The Battle Rages On... (1993)	P
Deep Purple	Shades 1968–1998 (1999)	P
The Del-Lords	Lovers Who Wander (1990)	P/E/M
Dion	Yo Frankie (1989)	M
The D.I.s	M	
Eastern Conference Champions	Ameritown (2007)	P/E/M
Elliott Murphy	Going Through Something (1996)	P
Eric Gales Band	Picture of a Thousand Faces (1993)	M
Euphoraphonic	Far from Home (2003)	P/E/M
Fear Factory	Linchpin (2002)	P/M
Fear Factory	Hatefiles (2003)	P/M
Fishbone	The Reality of My Surroundings (1991)	M
Gene Loves Jezebel	The Motion of Love (1987)	P/E/M
The Go-Go's	Vacation (1982)	E/M
The Graces	Perfect View (1989)	P
Grand Funk Railroad	Grand Funk Lives (1981)	P/E/M
Hanne Boel	Dark Passion (1990)	E
Hanne Boel	My Kindred Spirit (1992)	E
Hanne Boel	Kinda Soul (1992)	E
Hericane Alice	Tear the House Down (1990)	P
Holly and the Italians	The Right to Be Italian (1981)	E
I.C.U.	Defy (1993)	E
Iggy Pop	Soldier (1980)	M
Iggy Pop	Party (1981)	P/E/M
Iggy Pop	The Story of Iggy Pop (1992)	P/E/M
Iggy Pop	The Heritage Collection (2000)	P/E/M
Iggy Pop	Platinum & Gold Collection (2004)	P
Iggy Pop	A Million in Prizes: The Anthology (2005)	P/E/M
The Jeff Healey Band	See the Light (1988)	CP/E/M
The Jeff Healey Band	Cover to Cover (1995)	P/E/M
The Jeff Healey Band	Platinum & Gold Collection (2004)	P
Jimmy Barnes	For the Working Class Man / Jimmy Barnes (1985)	E
Jimmy Barnes	In the Heat of the Night (2006)	E
Jimmy Barnes	JB50 (2006)	E
Jimmy Cliff	In Concert: The Best of Jimmy Cliff (1976)	E/M
Joan Armatrading	Me Myself I (1980)	E/M
Joan Jett	The Hit List (1990)	P/E/M
Joan Jett & the Blackhearts	Glorious Results of a Misspent Youth (1984)	P/E/M
Joan Jett & the Blackhearts	Good Music (1986)	P/E/M
Joan Jett & the Blackhearts	Up Your Alley (1988)	P/E/M
Joan Jett & the Blackhearts	Notorious (1991)	P/M
Joan Jett & the Blackhearts	Fetish (1999)	P
Joan Jett & the Blackhearts	Fit to Be Tied (1997)	P/E/M
Joan Jett & the Blackhearts	Do You Wanna Touch Me (1993)	P
Joan Jett & the Blackhearts	Flashback (1993)	P/M
Joan Jett & the Blackhearts	Pure and Simple (1994)	P/E/M
Joan Jett & the Blackhearts	Jett Rock (2003)	P/E/M
Joan Jett & the Blackhearts	Naked (2004)	E
Joan Jett & the Blackhearts	Sinner (2006)	E
John Cafferty and the Beaver Brown Band	Roadhouse: The Voice of Eddie and the Cruisers (1998)	M
Kelly Osbourne	Shut Up / Changes (2002)	P/E/M
Kid Creole	Going Places: The August Darnell Years 1976-1983 (2008)	E
Kids in the Kitchen	Kids in the Kitchen	P
Kim Larsen & Jungledreams	Sitting on a Time Bomb (1982)	E
Laura Warshauer	The Pink Chariot Mixtape (2011)	P
Lifehouse	Who We Are (2007)	M
Link Wray	Live at the Paradiso (1980)	CP/E/M
Lions & Ghosts	Wild Garden (1989)	P/E/M
Little Bob Story	Too Young to Love Me (1984)	P/E/M
Lone Justice	Lone Justice (1985)	E
Lone Justice	This World Is Not My Home (1998)	E
Machine	There But for the Grace of God Go I (1992)	E
Maria McKee	You Gotta Sin to Get Saved (1993)	E
Maria Vidal	Maria Vidal (1987)	E
Mark Farner	No Frills (1978)	E
Marshall Crenshaw	Marshall Crenshaw (1982)	E/M
Marshall Crenshaw	Downtown (1985)	E/M
Mary Cutrufello	When the Night Is Through (1998)	P/E/M
Matt White	Best Days (2007)	P/E
Mental As Anything	Fundamental (1985)	E/M
Metal Church	Hanging in the Balance (1993)	P/E/M
Michael Falch	De Vildeste Fugle (1988)	M
Mink DeVille	Coup de Grâce (1981)	P/E/M
Mother's Finest	Black Radio Won't Play This Record (1992)	P/E
Motörhead	Hammered (2002)	P/E/M
Nelly Furtado	Loose (2006)	EP
New Found Glory	Coming Home (2006)	P
No Doubt	Return of Saturn (2000)	E
No Doubt	Everything in Time (2003)	E
No Doubt	Boom Box (2003)	E
Nuclear Valdez	I Am I (1989)	P/E/M
Outcry	This Side of Anywhere (1997)	M
Ozzy Osbourne	Live at Budokan (2002)	P/E/M
Ozzy Osbourne	Blizzard of Ozz (Reissue 2002)	E/M
Ozzy Osbourne	Diary of a Madman (Reissue 2002)	E/M
Ozzy Osbourne	The Essential Ozzy Osbourne (2003)	P
Ozzy Osbourne	Prince of Darkness (2005)	P
Patti LaBelle	Winner in You (1986)	E
Patti Smith	Easter (1978)	E
Patti Smith	Dream of Life (1988)	E
Patti Smith	The Patti Smith Masters: The Collective Works (1996)	P/E
Paul Butterfield	The Legendary Paul Butterfield Rides Again (1986)	P/E/M
Peter Murphy	"Hit Song"	E
Poison	Hollyweird (2002)	P/E/M
Poison	Poison'd! (2007)	P
Poison	Nothin' But a Good Time (2010)	P
Puzzle Gut	Puzzle Gut (1997)	P/E/M
The Reverend Horton Heat	Liquor in the Front (1994)	M
The Reverend Horton Heat	It's Martini Time (1996)	P/E/M
The Reverend Horton Heat	Holy Roller (1999)	P/E/M
Revólver	Calle Mayor (1996)	P/E
Revólver	Grandes Éxitos (2003)	P/E
The Roches	Another World (1985)	E
The Roches	The Collected Works of the Roches (2003)	E
Robert Gordon	Bad Boy (1980)	E
Robert Gordon	Too Fast to Live, Too Young to Die (1982)	E
Roger Daltrey	A Celebration: The Music of Pete Townshend and The Who (1994)	E/M
Sepultura	Roots (1996)	M
Shaggy	Clothes Drop (2005)	P/M
Sheryl Crow	C'Mon, C'Mon (2002)	E
Slaves On Dope	Inches from the Mainline (2000)	P/E/M
Slayer	Live Intrusion (1995)	M
Soul Asylum	Runaway Train (1993)	E/M
Soul Asylum	Black Gold (2000)	E/M
Stella Soleil	Dirty Little Secret (2001)	P/E/M
Stevie Nicks	Bella Donna (1981)	E
Stevie Nicks	Street Angel (1994)	P/E/M
Tito & Tarantula	Tarantism (1997)	M
Tom Jones	The Lead and How to Swing It (1994)	P/E/M
Tom Jones	"I Wanna Get Back with You" (1995)	P
Tom Petty & the Heartbreakers	Damn the Torpedoes (1979)	AE
Tom Petty & the Heartbreakers	Long After Dark (1982)	M
Tom Petty & the Heartbreakers	Playback (1995)	E
Tommy James	In Touch (1976)	M
Tracy Chapman	Matters of the Heart (1992)	E
The Uninvited	Uninvited (1998)	P/E/M
U2	Rattle and Hum (1988)	E/M
Various Artists	Take It or Leave It: A Tribute to the Queens of Noise – The Runaways (2011)	P
Various Artists	VH1 Stoytellers (2000)	M
Various Artists	Live and Unreleased from Farmclub.com (2002)	P/E/M
Various Artists	Rubaiyat: Elektra's 40th Anniversary (1990)	E/M
Various Artists	America: A Tribute to Heroes (2001)	M
Various Artists	Ozzfest Live (1997)	P/E/M
Various Artists	Ozzfest: Second Stage Live (2001)	P/E/M
Various Artists	Ozzfest 2002 (2002)	P/E/M
Various Artists	Special Olympics: A Very Special Christmas (1987)	E
Various Artists	A Very Special Christmas 2 (1992)	E
Various Artists	A Very Special Christmas Live (1999)	M
Various Artists	A Very Special Christmas 5 (2001)	E
Various Artists	Laguna Tunes (2000)	E/M
Various Artists	Festival of Light, Vol. 2 (1999)	P/E/M
Various Artists	Soul Divas (2005)	E
Various Artists	Spirit of '73: Rock for Choice (1995)	E
Various Artists	Christmas of Hope (1995)	E
Various Artists	Flavors of Jazz (1997)	P
Various Artists	Genrecide: A Compilation, Vol. 1 (1993)	E/M
Various Artists	"We Are the World" (1985)	M
Various Artists	Reelin' in the Years, Vol. 1 (1983)	E
Venice	Spin Art (1999)	M
Vinnie James	All American Boy (1991)	P
The Wallflowers	"Letters from the Wasteland" (2000)	M
War Babies	War Babies (1991)	P/E/M
Will T. Massey	Will T. Massey (1991)	P/E/M
William Tell	You Can Hold Me Down (2007)	P/M
Willie Nile	Golden Down (1981)	P/E/M
The Young Dubliners	Red (2000)	P/E/M

Movie soundtrack	Credit
Ace Ventura: When Nature Calls	P
Bachelor Party	E/M
Blair Witch 2: Book of Shadows	P
Blast from the Past	P/E
Days of Thunder	CP/E/M
Buffy the Vampire Slayer	P
Desperado	M
Fast Times at Ridgemont High	E/M
Flintstones in Viva Rock Vegas	P
Gotcha	CP/E/M
Heavy Metal	E/M
Less than Zero	E/M
Light of Day	CP/E/M
Mr. Wrong	P
Navy Seals	P/E/M
No Nukes	E/M
Rattle and Hum	E
Road House	CP/E/M
Shark Tale	P
Singles	CP/E/M
Tank Girl	M
The Air Up There	M
Times Square	E/M
Varsity Blues	M
Wild Life	E/M

TV soundtrack	Credit
Galaxy Rangers	P/E/M
MTV Presents Laguna Beach: Summer Can Last Forever	P
One Life to Live: The Best of Love	E/M
Osbourne Family Album	E/M
