= Love Crushed Velvet =

American rock band

- Origin: New York City, New York
- Genres: Rock, pop, new wave revival
- Years active: 2008–present
- Members: A.L.X. (vocals); Thommy Price (drummer); Jimi Bones (guitar); Enzo Penizzotto (bass); Stan Eposito II (bass 2022-present); Charlie Raugh (guitar 2022-present); Massimo Maiorana (drums); Emilie Bienne (keys 2022-present)
- Website: Official Site

Love Crushed Velvet is a rock band from New York City, New York.

Lead singer and songwriter A.L.X. began collaborating with drummer Thommy Price (Billy Idol, Joan Jett, Blue Öyster Cult, Scandal) in 2008. Jimi Bones (Joan Jett, Blondie) joined as lead guitarist, and Enzo Penizzotto (Joan Jett) was the primary bass player on what became the band's self-titled debut album. The album was recorded at Shabby Road Studio and Kingsland Recording in Brooklyn, NY, and in the studio of Brian McGee, also in New York. British producer and engineer Dave Bascombe (Tears for Fears, Depeche Mode, The Human League, Erasure, Goldfrapp, Placebo) mixed the album, which was officially released in the U.S. on July 12, 2011.

The band's lineup varies for live performances, with A.L.X. being the key consistent member. Keyboardist Linda Leseman has played with A.L.X. in New York since May 2010, and 2011 performances have included drummers Aaron A. Brooks (Moby) and Massimo "Max" Majorana and guitarist Jay Stone, who has been a long-time songwriting partner of A.L.X. Bass players Drew Mortali and Darren Korb, both of whom were featured on the record, have also performed live with the band.

In early 2011, the song "Letter", remixed by DJ Asha and 2 a.m., became a viral hit on electronic music blogs. In July of the same year, "Goodbye Goldblatt" was added to the game Rock Band 3.

== Discography ==
Love Crushed Velvet (2011)
Delusions (2013)
Firefly: The Pilbara Anthems (2015)
Souls and the Barren Heart (2022)
Ping Pong in the Bunker (2024)
