= The Ghosts That Haunt Me (song) =

Promotional single by Crash Test Dummies

from the album The Ghosts That Haunt Me
- Released: August 1991
- Label: BMG/Arista
- Songwriter: Brad Roberts
- Producer: Steve Berlin

Crash Test Dummies singles chronology
"Superman's Song" (1991)	"The Ghosts That Haunt Me" (1991)	"Androgynous" (1991)

"The Ghosts That Haunt Me" is a song by Crash Test Dummies and was the second single from their 1991 debut album The Ghosts That Haunt Me.

== Music video ==
The music video features the band performing at a puppet show featuring a couple of skeletons.

== Charts ==
Chart (1991)	Peak position
Canadian Singles Chart	23
