= Sinner (Joan Jett album) =

Studio album by Joan Jett and the Blackhearts
- Released: June 13, 2006
- Recorded: 1999; 2004–2006
- Studio: Soundtrack (New York City) (new tracks)
- Genres: Hard rock; alternative rock
- Length: 51:30
- Label: Blackheart
- Producers: Kenny Laguna; Ted Templeman; Bob Rock; Joey Levine; Joan Jett

Joan Jett and the Blackhearts chronology
Naked (2004)	Sinner (2006)	Greatest Hits (2010)

Professional ratings
Review scores
Source	Rating
AllMusic	3/5 stars

Sinner is the eleventh studio album by American rock singer Joan Jett and the ninth to feature her backing band the Blackhearts. It was released on June 13, 2006, by Blackheart Records. While most of the contents previously appeared on the Japan-only release Naked (2004), some in different mixes, it is her first record of new material released in the United States since Pure and Simple in 1994. Singles released include "A.C.D.C." (originally by the Sweet) and "Riddles" (Jett's first-ever political song), which is a new version of "Right in the Middle" from Naked with different lyrics.

An edited "clean" version was also released. The CD also includes enhanced content, consisting of a lyrics sheet (in PDF format) and a video of the recording of "A.C.D.C.".

== Track listing ==
Sinner track listing
No.	Title	Writer(s)	Producer	Length
1.	"Riddles"	Joan Jett; Linda Perry; Kenny Laguna	Laguna	4:01
2.	"A.C.D.C." (cover of the Sweet)	Nicky Chinn; Mike Chapman	Laguna	3:20
3.	"Five" (from Naked)	Jett; Kathleen Hanna; Jim Vallance	Laguna; Ted Templeman	5:14
4.	"Naked" (from Naked)	Jett; Rudy Yuly	Laguna	3:51
5.	"Everyone Knows" (from Naked)	Jett; Laguna; Vallance	Laguna; Bob Rock	3:13
6.	"Change the World"	Jett; Billy Crooked; Laguna	Laguna	3:07
7.	"Androgynous" (cover of the Replacements) (from Naked)	Paul Westerberg	Laguna; Templeman	3:08
8.	"Fetish" (from Naked)	Jett	Laguna	3:23
9.	"Watersign" (from Naked)	Jett; Hanna; Vallance	Laguna; Templeman	3:10
10.	"Tube Talkin'" (from Naked)	Jett; Hanna	Laguna; Templeman	3:37
11.	"Turn It Around" (from Naked)	Jett	Laguna; Jett	3:44
12.	"Baby Blue" (from Naked)	Jett; Hanna; Laguna	Laguna; Templeman	4:06
13.	"A Hundred Feet Away" (listed as "A 100 Feet Away")	Jett; Laguna; Peter Anders	Laguna	2:33
14.	"Bad Time" (from Naked)	Jett; Laguna; Joey Levine	Laguna; Levine	5:01
Total length:				51:30

== Personnel ==
Joan Jett and the Blackhearts

- Joan Jett – rhythm guitar, lead vocals
- Dougie Needles – lead guitar, backing vocals
- Enzo Penizzotto – bass, backing vocals
- Thommy Price – drums
- Kenny Laguna – keyboards, backing vocals

Production

- Mike Scielzi – engineer at Soundtrack Studios
- Billy Crater – additional engineering
- Craig Snyder – additional engineering
- Thom Panunzio – additional engineering
- Greg Calbi – mastering at Sterling Sound, New York City
