= Nuclear Valdez =

Nuclear Valdez is an American rock band from Miami, Florida, United States. The band members all are of Latin American descent and were born outside of the United States.

== Background information ==
Nuclear Valdez was formed in Miami in 1983 by vocalist and guitarist Froilan Sosa and lead guitarist Jorge Barcala, who replaced Angel Forte when he left the band. Bassist and vocalist Juan Diaz joined the following year, and drummer and vocalist Robert Slade LeMont (born Roberto Perez in 1957) the year after. Sosa was born in the Dominican Republic, while the other three members were born in Cuba. They took their name from a former coworker of Diaz who had an "explosive temper."

After several years as a popular club band and opening act in the South Florida music scene, the band was signed to Epic Records in 1989. Their debut album, I Am I, was released that year, with production from Richard Gottehrer and Thom Panunzio. Featured artists on the album included Bruce Brody (Lone Justice, Patti Smith Group), Benmont Tench (Tom Petty and the Heartbreakers), and Meredith Brooks. The track "Summer" from the album became a minor radio hit, and was put into active rotation on MTV. Nuclear Valdez performed the track on MTV Unplugged later that year, making them the first all-Latino act to appear on the show.

The band did an MTV promo spot with video director Paula Grief and performed on an early episode of MTV Unplugged with members of The Alarm. They opened for numerous groups that came through their home base in Miami: Living Colour, Jane's Addiction, Dead Milkmen, Ronnie Wood, Hoodoo Gurus, among others. The band did an extensive tour of the US opening up for The Hooters. US tour followed by an intensive European tour as the supporting act for The Church. Song "Dance Where the Bullets Fly" from the second album was used in one of the season finales of Melrose Place.

== Members ==
The members of the band are:

- Froilan Sosa - Vocals / Guitar / Keyboards
- Juan Luis Diaz - Bass
- Robert Slade LeMont - Drums
- Jorge Barcala - Lead Guitar (original band guitarist on first two albums)
- Rafael Tarrago - Lead Guitar

== Discography ==
Albums:

- I Am I (1989, Epic/CBS Records) – including the radio hit "Summer"
- Dream Another Dream (1991, Epic)
- In a Minute All Could Change (2000)
- Present From The Past (2017)
