= The Hit List (Joan Jett album) =

- Cover photo by Matthew Rolston

Studio album by Joan Jett
- Released: January 16, 1990
- Recorded: 1986 and 1989
- Studio: The Hit Factory (New York City)
- Genres: Hard rock; punk rock
- Length: 35:45
- Labels: Blackheart; CBS; Sony; (US and Japan); Chrysalis (Europe)
- Producers: Kenny Laguna; Thom Panunzio; Joan Jett

Joan Jett chronology
Up Your Alley (1988)	The Hit List (1990)	Notorious (1991)

Singles from The Hit List
- 1. "Dirty Deeds" / "Let It Bleed" Released: 1989; 2. "Love Hurts" / "Up from the Skies" Released: 1990

Professional ratings
Review scores
Source	Rating
AllMusic	3/5 stars
Robert Christgau	(dud)
Rolling Stone	2/5 stars

The Hit List is the seventh studio album, and the first cover album by American rock singer Joan Jett. The album was released on January 16, 1990. All of the tracks are cover versions of notable songs.

"Dirty Deeds" was released as the first single, backed with the non-LP track "Let It Bleed", a cover version of the Rolling Stones song. It peaked at No. 36 on the US Billboard Hot 100. "Love Hurts" was released as the second single, backed with "Handyman" from Jett's third studio album Album (1983), but it failed to chart in the US. In foreign markets, the song was paired with "Up from the Skies"; in the UK, it was issued by Chrysalis Records with "Pretty Vacant" as its B-side.

== Track listing ==
No.	Title	Writer(s)	Original artist (date)	Length
1.	"Dirty Deeds"	Angus Young; Bon Scott; Malcolm Young	AC/DC (1976)	3:18
2.	"Love Hurts"	Boudleaux Bryant	The Everly Brothers (1960)	3:47
3.	"Pretty Vacant"	Paul Cook; Steve Jones; John Lydon; Glen Matlock	Sex Pistols (1977)	3:24
4.	"Celluloid Heroes"	Ray Davies	The Kinks (1972)	5:28
5.	"Tush"	Billy Gibbons; Dusty Hill; Frank Beard	ZZ Top (1975)	2:23
6.	"Time Has Come Today"	Willie Chambers; Joseph Chambers	The Chambers Brothers (1968)	4:13
7.	"Up from the Skies"	Jimi Hendrix	The Jimi Hendrix Experience (1967)	3:01
8.	"Have You Ever Seen the Rain?"	John Fogerty	Creedence Clearwater Revival (1970)	3:33
9.	"Love Me Two Times"	Jim Morrison; Ray Manzarek; Robby Krieger; John Densmore	The Doors (1967)	3:07
10.	"Roadrunner USA" (1990 version)	Jonathan Richman	The Modern Lovers (1972)	3:34
Total length:				35:45

1992 Japanese edition bonus tracks
No.	Title	Writer(s)	Original artist (date)	Length
11.	"Let It Bleed"	Mick Jagger; Keith Richards	The Rolling Stones (1969)	4:19
12.	"Dirty Deeds" (extended version)	Angus Young; Bon Scott; Malcolm Young	AC/DC (1976)	4:33

== Personnel ==
Joan Jett and the Blackhearts

- Joan Jett – rhythm guitar, lead vocals, co-producer
- Ricky Byrd – lead guitar, backing vocals
- Kasim Sulton – bass, backing vocals
- Thommy Price – drums

Additional musicians

- Sandy Gennaro – drums
- Ray Davies – guitar, vocals
- Peppy Castro – guitar, vocals
- Ronnie Lawson – keyboards
- Bashiri Johnson – percussion
- Darlene Love – backing vocals
- Chuck Kentis – backing vocals
- Kenny Laguna – various instruments and backing vocals

The Uptown Horns

- Crispin Cioe – baritone saxophone
- Robert Funk – trombone
- Arno Hecht – tenor saxophone
- Paul Litteral – trumpet

Production

- Kenny Laguna – production
- Thom Panunzio – co-producer, engineer, mixing
- Jay Healy – engineering, mixing of "Have You Ever Seen the Rain?"
- Tom Cadley – engineering
- John Aiosa – engineering
- Paul Logas – engineering
- Tom Fritze – assistant engineer
- Rick Travali – assistant engineer
- Robert Smith – assistant engineer
- Michael Gilbert – assistant engineer
- Andrew Grassi – assistant engineer
- Bob Ludwig – mastering at Masterdisk, New York

== Charts ==
Chart (1990)	Peak position
Australian Albums (ARIA Charts)	88
Canada Top Albums/CDs (RPM)	68
Finnish Albums (Suomen virallinen lista)	32
New Zealand Albums (RMNZ)	16
Swedish Albums (Sverigetopplistan)	22
Swiss Albums (Schweizer Hitparade)	27
US Billboard 200	36
