= Pure and Simple (Joan Jett album) =

Studio album by Joan Jett and the Blackhearts
- Released: June 14, 1994
- Studio: The Hit Factory (New York City); Studio Works 11 (Island Park, New York); Armoury (Vancouver, Canada); Bad Animals (Seattle, Washington); Indigo Ranch (Malibu, California); Music Palace (New Hempstead, New York)
- Genre: Hard rock; power pop
- Length: 46:57
- Label: Blackheart; Warner Bros.
- Producer: Kenny Laguna; Thom Panunzio; Ed Stasium; Desmond Child; Jim Vallance; Joan Jett

Joan Jett and the Blackhearts chronology
Flashback (1993)	Pure and Simple (1994)	Fit to be Tied (1997)

Professional ratings
Review scores
Source	Rating
AllMusic	3/5 stars
Robert Christgau	(2-star Honorable Mention)
Rolling Stone	3/5 stars

Pure and Simple is the ninth studio album by American rock singer Joan Jett and the seventh to feature her backing band the Blackhearts. It was released on June 14, 1994 by Blackheart and Warner Bros. Records.

== Background ==
The album includes several tracks co-written with Kathleen Hanna of Bikini Kill, including "Go Home", a response to the murder of Mia Zapata, lead vocalist and lyricist of the punk rock band the Gits.

Pure and Simple was the first album to feature a new line up of the Blackhearts' members since the departure of longtime guitarist Ricky Byrd and bassist Kasim Sulton after the release of Jett's previous studio album, Notorious (1991). This new line up consisted of bassist Kenny Aaronson and lead guitarist Tony Rey. Pure and Simple would be Joan Jett and the Blackhearts' last studio album until 2006's Sinner. In 1995, both Aaronson and Rey went on to other projects. Aaronson would eventually become a member of the reunited New York Dolls – coincidentally taking over for bassist Sami Yaffa, his replacement in the Blackhearts and Rey became the musical director for Enrique Iglesias and Rihanna.

The CD and other versions feature collaborations with performers from riot grrrl and riot grrrl-associated bands. On all editions, songs "Go Home", "Spinster", "Activity Girl", and "You Got a Problem" were written with Kathleen Hanna (Bikini Kill, the Julie Ruin, Le Tigre); on the vinyl release "Here to Stay" was written with Kat Bjelland (Babes in Toyland); on the Japanese edition "Hostility" was written with Donita Sparks (L7).

"World of Denial" was also added to the Japanese pressings. The Japanese cover differs from the regular cover. "Get Off the Cross" was also recorded during these sessions. Concurrently released in the U.S. on LP, CD, and cassette, all versions varying slightly. The record album came with a hype sticker that read "All Rock. No Ballads", and omits both "As I Am" and "Brighter Day". A few seconds of "Here to Stay" are also heard on the cassette at the very end of side one before fading out. Jett independently put out "Spinster" as a 7-inch blue vinyl single in the U.S. with a picture sleeve. The B-sides were "Go Home" and "Hostility". The track "World of Denial" was eventually released in the U.S. on Jett's compilation album Fit to Be Tied (1997).

== Track listing ==
Pure and Simple track listing
No.	Title	Writer(s)	Length
1.	"Go Home"	Joan Jett; Kathleen Hanna	2:42
2.	"Eye to Eye"	Jett; Jim Vallance; Kenny Laguna	3:30
3.	"Spinster"	Jett; Hanna	2:44
4.	"Torture"	Jett; Vallance; Laguna	3:35
5.	"Rubber & Glue"	Jett; Hanna	3:19
6.	"As I Am"	Jett; Desmond Child	4:35
7.	"Activity Grrrl"	Jett; Hanna	3:45
8.	"Insecure"	Jett; Vallance; Laguna	3:11
9.	"Wonderin'"	Jett; Vallance; Laguna	4:53
10.	"Consumed"	Jett; Thommy Price	4:40
11.	"You Got a Problem"	Jett; Child; Hanna	3:57
12.	"Brighter Day"	Jett; Child	6:06

Vinyl release alternative track
No.	Title	Writer(s)	Length
11.	"Here to Stay"	Jett; Kat Bjelland	3:57

Japanese edition bonus tracks
No.	Title	Writer(s)	Length
7.	"Hostility"	Jett; Donita Sparks	3:37
12.	"World of Denial"	Jett; Kenny Aaronson	4:14

== Personnel ==
Joan Jett and the Blackhearts

- Joan Jett – guitars, lead vocals, producer on "Hostility"
- Tony Rey – lead guitars
- Kenny Aaronson – bass
- Thommy Price – drums

Additional musicians

- Ricky Byrd – guitar
- John Marshall – guitar
- Billy Karren – guitar
- Blake Brocksmith – harmonica on "Go Home" and "As I Am"
- Mike Howe – vocals
- Kathleen Hanna – vocals
- Chuck Kentis – keyboards
- Arno Hecht – saxophone

Production

- Kenny Laguna – producer on all tracks
- Thom Panunzio – producer on tracks 1, 2, 4, 7, 9, 10 and bonus tracks, engineer, mixing
- Ed Stasium – producer on tracks 1 and 8
- Jim Vallance – producer on tracks 2 and 4
- Desmond Child – producer on tracks 6, 11 and 12
- John Aiosa – engineer, digital editing
- Lance Clark – digital editing
- Carl Glanville – assistant engineer
- Lee Anthony – assistant engineer
- Tim Donovan – assistant engineer
- Mike Thompson – assistant engineer
- Neil Perry – assistant engineer
- Danny Kadar – assistant engineer
- Adam Kasper – assistant engineer
- Delwyn Brooks – assistant engineer
- Chuck Johnson – assistant engineer
- Bob Ludwig – mastering at Gateway Studios, Portland, Maine
- Spencer Drate – album design
- Judith Salavetz – album design
- Meryl Laguna – art direction
- George Holz – photography

== Charts ==
Chart performance for Pure and Simple
Chart (1994)	Peak position
Australian Albums (ARIA)	142
