= Up Your Alley (album) =

Studio album by Joan Jett and the Blackhearts
- Released: May 23, 1988
- Studios: The Hit Factory (New York City); Record Plant (New York City); Bearsville (Bearsville, New York); Dreamland (Woodstock, New York)
- Genres: Hard rock; glam metal
- Length: 41:20
- Labels: Blackheart; CBS
- Producers: Kenny Laguna; Ric Browde; Desmond Child

Joan Jett and the Blackhearts chronology
Good Music (1986)	Up Your Alley (1988)	The Hit List (1990)

Singles from Up Your Alley
- 1. "I Hate Myself for Loving You" Released: June 1988; 2. "Little Liar" Released: 1988

Professional ratings
Review scores
Source	Rating
AllMusic	2/5 stars
Rolling Stone	3/5 stars
The Village Voice	B+

Up Your Alley is the sixth studio album by American rock singer Joan Jett and the fifth to feature her backing band the Blackhearts. It was released on May 23, 1988, by Blackheart Records and CBS Records in the US, and by Polydor Records in Europe and Japan, a year and a half after their previous studio album Good Music (1986). This album contains the single "I Hate Myself for Loving You", which peaked at No. 8 on the US Billboard Hot 100, and had been used as the theme song for Sunday Night Football (SNF) National Football League (NFL) games in America (with altered lyrics, by two singers) during the 2006 and 2007 seasons. The follow-up single "Little Liar" continued Jett's chart success, peaking at No. 19 on the Hot 100 in late 1988 and early 1989.

Up Your Alley peaked at No. 19 on the US Billboard 200 albums chart and has since been certified Platinum.

Former Rolling Stones guitarist Mick Taylor played the guitar solo on "I Hate Myself for Loving You".

"I Hate Myself for Loving You" was released as the first single, backed with a live version of the Jett composition "Love Is Pain" (the original version of which appears on the 1981 studio album I Love Rock 'n Roll). "Little Liar" was the second single, backed with an obscure Jett and Kenny Laguna composition "What Can I Do for You", which had been recorded for a film that Jett was set to make in 1979 that was never completed. The song eventually turned up again on the Jett fan-club only CD 1979. For Record Store Day in 2015, the track was included on the limited edition (4000 split color vinyl) LP The First Sessions documenting the first several songs Jett wrote with Laguna, her newly acquired producer.

Two music videos were shot for "Little Liar", the first, a concept video, feature a slightly confusing storyline with two Jetts (one in white, one in black) interacting. After seeing the result of the first "Little Liar" video, Jett was unhappy with the silliness and visual translation so immediately shot a new live video (synced with the studio version of the song) for this track. The new video captured a more authentic feel with raw live shots combined with cutaways and studio shot closeups of Jett. It was a more stylized live video with Ziggy Stardust-like artistic flourishes.

Joan Jett and the Blackhearts were nominated for a Grammy Award in 1988 for Best Rock Performance by a Duo or Group with Vocal for "I Hate Myself for Loving You".

== Track listing ==
Side one
No.	Title	Writer(s)	Length
1.	"I Hate Myself for Loving You"	Joan Jett; Desmond Child	4:07
2.	"Ridin' with James Dean"	Jett; Ricky Byrd; Ric Browde	3:17
3.	"Little Liar"	Jett; Child	4:01
4.	"Tulane" (Chuck Berry cover)	Chuck Berry	2:54
5.	"I Wanna Be Your Dog" (the Stooges cover)	Dave Alexander; Ron Asheton; Scott Asheton; Iggy Pop	5:12

Side two
No.	Title	Writer(s)	Length
6.	"I Still Dream About You"	Jett; Byrd; Gary Rottger	3:23
7.	"You Want In, I Want Out"	Jett; Child	4:15
8.	"Just Like in the Movies"	Jett; Browde; Byrd; Kenny Laguna	3:05
9.	"Desire"	Jett; Diane Warren; Laguna	3:53
10.	"Back It Up"	Jett; Byrd; Browde	3:31
11.	"Play That Song Again"	Jett; Byrd; Frank Carillo	3:42
Total length:			41:20

== Personnel ==
Credits are adapted from the album's liner notes.

Joan Jett and the Blackhearts

- Joan Jett – lead vocals, rhythm guitars
- Ricky Byrd – lead guitar, backing vocals
- Kasim Sulton – bass, backing vocals
- Thommy Price – drums

Additional musicians

- The Uptown Horns:
  - Crispin Choe – baritone saxophone
  - Arno Hecht – tenor saxophone
  - Paul Litteral – trumpet
  - Robert Funk – trombone
- Ronnie Lawson – keyboards
- Mick Taylor – guitar solo on track 1
- Frank Carillo – guitar; backing vocals
- Kenny Laguna – various instruments; backing vocals
- Desmond Child – backing vocals
- Chuck Kentis – backing vocals
- Louie Merlino – backing vocals
- Paul Carrizzo – backing vocals

Production team

- Kenny Laguna – production on all tracks
- Ric Browde – production on tracks 2, 4–6, 8–11
- Desmond Child – production on tracks 1 and 3
- Thom Panunzio – associate producer; engineering; mixing
- Jay Healy – engineer; mixer on track 5
- Arthur Payson – engineer
- James A. Ball – engineer
- John Aiosa – engineer
- Andrew Spigleman – assistant engineer
- David Cook – assistant engineer
- Rich Travali – assistant engineer
- Roger Talkov – assistant engineer
- Scott Forman – assistant engineer
- Teddy Trewhella – assistant engineer
- Thom Cadley – assistant engineer
- Bob Ludwig – mastering at Masterdisk, New York

== Charts ==
=== Weekly charts ===
Weekly chart performance for Up Your Alley
Chart (1988)	Peak position
Canada Top Albums/CDs (RPM)	48
Finnish Albums (Suomen virallinen lista)	33
New Zealand Albums (RMNZ)	31
Swedish Albums (Sverigetopplistan)	16
US Billboard 200	19

=== Year-end charts ===
1989 year-end chart performance for Up Your Alley
Chart (1989)	Position
US Billboard 200	99

== Certifications ==
Certifications for Up Your Alley
Region	Certification	Certified units/sales
Canada (Music Canada)	Gold	50,000^{^}
United States (RIAA)	Platinum	1,000,000^{^}
^{^} Shipments figures based on certification alone.
