= Naked (Joan Jett album) =

Studio album by Joan Jett and the Blackhearts
- Released: April 27, 2004
- Studios: Armoury Studios and Vancouver Studios, Vancouver, Canada, Studio 900, Crushing Music, Videoland, Loho Studios and The Hit Factory, New York City, Soundnet, Long Beach, New York, One on One Recording, Los Angeles
- Genres: Hard rock, alternative rock
- Length: 62:21
- Label: Blackheart/Victor
- Producers: Kenny Laguna; Ted Templeman; Bob Rock; Joey Levine; Joan Jett; Tony Bruno

Joan Jett and the Blackhearts chronology
Fetish (1999)	Naked (2004)	Sinner (2006)

Naked is the tenth studio album released only in Japan by American rock band Joan Jett and the Blackhearts. The album was released on April 27, 2004.

== Track listing ==
Naked track listing
No.	Title	Writer(s)	Length
1.	"Naked"	Joan Jett, Rudy Yuly	4:07
2.	"Bad Time" (JJ Mix)	Jett, Joey Levine, Kenny Laguna	4:59
3.	"Fetish"	Jett	3:22
4.	"Androgynous" (cover of The Replacements)	Paul Westerberg	3:08
5.	"Science Fiction/Double Feature" (Punk version)	Richard O'Brien	3:54
6.	"Right in the Middle"	Jett, Linda Perry, Laguna	3:48
7.	"Turn It Around"	Jett	3:45
8.	"Everyone Knows"	Jett, Jim Vallance, Laguna	3:10
9.	"Baby Blue"	Jett, Kathleen Hanna, Laguna	4:05
10.	"Kiss on the Lips"	Jett, Hanna, Tony Bruno, Laguna	3:22
11.	"Watersign"	Jett, Hanna, Vallance	3:10
12.	"Tube Talkin'"	Jett, Hanna	3:37
13.	"Season of the Witch" (cover of Donovan)	Donovan Leitch	5:03
14.	"Bad Time" (Monster Mix)	Jett, Levine, Laguna	5:00
15.	"Can't Live Without You"	Jett, Vallance, Laguna	2:34
16.	"Five"	Jett, Hanna, Vallance	5:16

== Personnel ==
=== The Blackhearts ===
- Joan Jett – rhythm guitar, lead vocals, producer on track 7
- Doug Cangialosi – lead guitar, backing vocals
- Sami Yaffa – bass, backing vocals
- Thommy Price – drums
- Kenny Laguna – keyboards, backing vocals, producer on all tracks

=== Additional musicians ===
- Tony "Bruno" Rey – guitars, backing vocals, producer on track 10, engineer
- Joey Levine, Kathleen Hanna – backing vocals
- Chris Palmero – orchestral arrangements on track 14

=== Production ===
- Joey Levine – producer on tracks 2 and 14
- Ted Templeman – producer on tracks 4, 9, 11–13
- Bob Rock – producer on tracks 8, 15 and 16
- Jeff Hendrickson, Joe Johnson, John Squicciarino, Randy Staub, John Aiosa, Paul Silveira, Brian Dobbs, Dave Liles, Jeff Delbello, Victor Luke, Frank Garfi, Thom Panunzio – engineers
- Peter Kuperschmid – engineer, mastering at Soundnet Studios
