= Fetish (Joan Jett and the Blackhearts album) =

Compilation album by Joan Jett and the Blackhearts
- Released: June 8, 1999
- Genres: Hard rock, alternative rock
- Length: 48:15
- Label: Blackheart/Mercury
- Producer: Kenny Laguna

Joan Jett and the Blackhearts chronology
Fit to Be Tied (1997)	Fetish (1999)	Naked (2004)

Professional ratings
Review scores
Source	Rating
AllMusic	2.5/5 stars

Fetish is a compilation album by American rock band Joan Jett and the Blackhearts, released on June 8, 1999.

Fetish contains three originals—two versions of the title track, and "Baby Blue," written with Kathleen Hanna of Bikini Kill. A live version of the Runaways' "Black Leather" was not on the original pressing of Fetish, but was added to later pressings. "Do You Wanna Touch Me" is also live. The Rolling Stones classic "Star Star," originally a hidden track on the cassette tape version of Album, is also included.

== Track listing ==
Fetish
No.	Title	Writer(s)	Length
1.	"Fetish"	Joan Jett	3:23
2.	"Handyman"	Joan Jett / Kenny Laguna	3:23
3.	"The French Song"	Ricky Byrd / Joan Jett / Kenny Laguna / Mike Winter Jr.	3:35
4.	"Baby Blue"	Kathleen Hanna / Joan Jett	4:06
5.	"Star Star"	Mick Jagger / Keith Richards	3:59
6.	"Love Is Pain"	Joan Jett	3:06
7.	"Secret Love"	Joan Jett / Kenny Laguna	4:03
8.	"Cherry Bomb"	Kim Fowley / Joan Jett	2:33
9.	"Hanky Panky"	Jeff Barry / Ellie Greenwich	3:29
10.	"Coney Island Whitefish"	Joan Jett	3:35
11.	"Wooly Bully"	Domingo Samudio	2:19
12.	"Do You Wanna Touch Me" (Live)	Gary Glitter / Mike Leander	3:36
13.	"Black Leather" (Live)	Steve Jones	3:40
14.	"Fetish (XXX)"	Joan Jett	3:28
Total length:			48:15
