= Notorious (Joan Jett album) =

Studio album by Joan Jett and the Blackhearts
- Released: August 20, 1991
- Recorded: 1991
- Studio: The Hit Factory (New York City)
- Genre: Hard rock; power pop
- Length: 45:03
- Label: Blackheart; Epic; Sony; (US and Japan): Blackheart; Bellaphon; (Europe)
- Producer: Kenny Laguna; Thom Panunzio; Joan Jett; Phil Ramone

Joan Jett and the Blackhearts chronology
The Hit List (1990)	Notorious (1991)	Flashback (1993)

Singles from Notorious
- 1. "Don't Surrender" Released: 1991; 2. "Treadin' Water" Released: 1992 (Europe only)

Professional ratings
Review scores
Source	Rating
AllMusic	2.5/5 stars
Robert Christgau	(dud)
Rolling Stone	3/5 stars

Notorious is the eighth studio album by American rock singer Joan Jett and the sixth to feature her backing band the Blackhearts. It was released on August 20, 1991.

== Background ==
"Backlash" co-written by Jett with Paul Westerberg of the Replacements was the label's first choice for a single, but the resulting one-track CD was only available as a promotional item sent to DJs. "Don't Surrender" was released in the US as a CD single accompanied by a remix ("The Most Excellent Mix") and the non-LP track "Misunderstood". "Wait for Me", a song Jett wrote when she was just 16, was a cover version of the Runaways' version from their third studio album Waitin' for the Night (1977). "I Want You" was a revised version of a song from 1979 that Jett and Kenny Laguna had written for a film that she was set to star in. The original lyrics (which can be heard on the fan-club only CD 1979) were nihilistic and raw, whereas the version heard on Notorious is politically correct.

Several editions of the album feature "Machismo" before "Goodbye", but this is the only difference.

"I Want You", as well as other songs by Joan Jett and the Blackhearts, was featured in Floria Sigismondi's biographical drama film The Runaways (2010), but they were not included on the soundtrack album of the film.

== Track listing ==
No.	Title	Writer(s)	Length
1.	"Backlash"	Joan Jett; Paul Westerberg	3:28
2.	"Ashes in the Wind"	Jett; Desmond Child	4:22
3.	"The Only Good Thing (You Ever Said Was Goodbye)"	Jett; Child; Diane Warren	4:27
4.	"Lie to Me"	Jett; Child; Kenny Laguna	4:30
5.	"Don't Surrender"	Jett; Child	4:10
6.	"Goodbye"	Jett; Child	4:00
7.	"Machismo"	Jett; Laguna	4:13
8.	"Treadin' Water"	Jett; Ricky Byrd; John McCurry; Richie Supa; Laguna	3:38
9.	"I Want You"	Jett; Ritchie Cordell; Laguna	3:04
10.	"Wait for Me" (The Runaways cover)	Jett	5:15
Total length:			45:03

Japanese edition bonus track
No.	Title	Writer(s)	Length
11.	"Misunderstood"	Jett; Thommy Price; Laguna	3:56

== Personnel ==
Joan Jett and the Blackhearts

- Joan Jett – rhythm guitars, lead vocals, co-producer
- Ricky Byrd – lead guitars, backing vocals
- Phil Feit – bass, backing vocals
- Thommy Price – drums

Additional musicians

- Paul Westerberg – guitar, vocals on "Backlash"
- Manny Caiati – bass, backing vocals on "The Only Good Thing (You Ever Said Was Goodbye)" and "Machismo"
- The Uptown Horns:
  - Crispin Choe – baritone saxophone
  - Robert Funk – trombone
  - Arno Hecht – tenor saxophone
  - Paul Litteral – trumpet
- The Federal Strings – strings

Production

- Kenny Laguna – producer on all tracks
- Phil Ramone – producer on track 3
- Thom Panunzio – co-producer, engineer, mixing
- Thom Cadley – engineer
- Carl Glanville – engineer
- Guy Gray – engineer
- John Aiosa – engineer
- Andy Grassi – assistant engineer
- Bob Smith – assistant engineer
- Bob Ludwig – mastering at Masterdisk, New York
