= I Hate Myself for Loving You =

Single by Joan Jett and the Blackhearts

from the album Up Your Alley
- B-side: "Love Is a Pain" (live) "I Can't Control Myself" (non-album track)
- Released: June 1988
- Studio: Dreamland (Hurley, New York)
- Genre: Hard rock; glam metal
- Length: 4:07
- Label: Blackheart
- Songwriters: Joan Jett; Desmond Child
- Producers: Desmond Child; Kenny Laguna

Joan Jett and the Blackhearts singles chronology
"Light of Day" (1987)	"I Hate Myself for Loving You" (1988)	"Little Liar" (1988)

Music video
- "I Hate Myself for Loving You" on YouTube

"I Hate Myself for Loving You" is a song by American rock band Joan Jett and the Blackhearts, released as the first single from their sixth studio album, Up Your Alley (1988). The song reached No. 8 on the U.S. Billboard Hot 100, Jett's third and last single to reach the top 10, and was her first placing there since "Crimson and Clover" in 1982. The song spent six weeks longer on the charts than the band's biggest hit, "I Love Rock 'n Roll" (which was on the chart for 20 weeks). On September 10, 2011, the single reached No. 39 on the U.S. Rock Digital Songs chart.

Mick Taylor, the former guitarist of the Rolling Stones played the guitar solo on the song.

A cover version of the Troggs' 1966 song "I Can't Control Myself" was featured as a B-side on the CD single.

== Critical reception and usage in other media ==
Cash Box called it "a mean, growling performance from the high-flying Jett" in which "over a craggy landscape of heavy guitars she exudes a sexual anger and power." A retrospective review for The Atlantic asked, "Does she really hate herself, though? This song has the emphatic stomp of celebration—fat handclaps and blocky major chords. Pump your fist for unhealthy choices; do another shot and text your ex: This is an anthem of American compulsion."

The song received a nomination for Best Rock Performance by a Duo or Group with Vocal at the 31st Annual Grammy Awards.

Taiwanese amateur composer Pei-Li Sun had extracted the chorus of this song for his solo work for the zhongruan named "Zhongruan Rock", written in 1993 and revised in 2008.

NBC Sunday Night Football adapted the song for its theme music, titled "Waiting All Day for Sunday Night", originally performed by singers Pink and Faith Hill followed by Carrie Underwood. Jett was initially skeptical of her music being used for the broadcast, feeling it did not fit her punk rock image, but was encouraged by her record producer Kenny Laguna since "there's nothing more American than what they're offering you". She and the Blackhearts also appear in Underwood's rendition for the 2019 NFL season.

== Personnel ==
Joan Jett and the Blackhearts

- Joan Jett – lead vocals, rhythm guitar
- Ricky Byrd – lead guitar, backing vocals
- Kasim Sulton – bass guitar, backing vocals
- Thommy Price – drums

Additional musicians

- Ronnie Lawson – keyboards
- Mick Taylor – guitar solo
- Desmond Child – production

== Charts ==
=== Weekly charts ===
Chart (1988)	Peak position
Canada Top Singles (RPM)	33
Netherlands (Dutch Top 40)	24
Netherlands (Single Top 100)	28
New Zealand (Recorded Music NZ)	8
Paraguay (El Siglo de Torreón)	9
Sweden (Sverigetopplistan)	12
UK Singles (Official Charts)	46
US Billboard Hot 100	8
US Mainstream Rock Airplay (Billboard)	20
US Top 100 Singles (Cash Box)	10
Zimbabwe (ZIMA)	1

=== Year-end charts ===
Chart (1988)	Position
Tokyo (Tokio Hot 100)	97
US Billboard Hot 100	85
