= Androgynous (song) =

Song by the Replacements

from the album Let It Be
- Released: 1984
- Studio: Blackberry Way Studios, Minneapolis
- Length: 3:11
- Label: Twin/Tone
- Songwriter: Paul Westerberg
- Producers: Steve Fjelstad; Peter Jesperson; Paul Westerberg

"Androgynous" is a song by the American rock band the Replacements, from their third studio album Let It Be (1984). The song has been described as "decades ahead of its time" and "a total miracle." It describes in positive terms a romantic relationship between two gender non-conforming individuals and predicts that in the future such people and their personal relationships will be more accepted. When performing the song live, the band would often wear dresses on stage.

Near the end of the song, Paul Westerberg sings the words "Jefferson's Cock." This is the name of an informal side project of the band, fronted by Replacements roadie Bill Sullivan.

An alternate version, with different vocals and restored piano notes in the opening, appears on the deluxe remastered edition of the "Let It Be" album released on October 24, 2025. This version of the song includes a different vocal take and the full piano introduction.

== Relevance ==
The song is notable for its themes of acceptance, tolerance, and respect, and its challenging of gender conformity.

Best Fit calls the song "one of the late 20th century's most poignant alternative anthems" and describes it as "questioning gender norms and promoting acceptance in a way that music had rarely done in the early 1980s." According to Slate, the song is "an open attack on gender roles."

The UK's Far Out Magazine says the song seeks to break down barriers. "The ideas are about tolerance between different opinions on gender norms. Although the couple in this song may have an androgynous approach to what they do, Westerberg reminds his audience that they are just ordinary people and should be treated with the same respect as anyone else."

A New York Times music journalist, on the release of the alternate version in 2025, said about the song: "Four decades later, when drag queens and transgender people are demonized for political gain, Paul Westerberg’s neighborly, live-and-let-live attitude — 'See no damage, see no evil at all' — is bracing."

== Personnel ==
Personnel taken from Let It Be liner notes

- Paul Westerberg – vocals, piano, sandblock percussion, production

== Covers ==
The song was covered by Crash Test Dummies and released as the third and final single from their debut album, The Ghosts That Haunt Me (1991). The music video shows the band performing at a fair attended by many genderqueer individuals.

Joan Jett and the Blackhearts covered the song on the albums Naked (2004) and Sinner (2006). Their music video shows Jett in a library, singing the song to a group of children from a book, with the story of Dick and Jane as told in the lyrics portrayed in the video. Musician John Doe plays Dick, the author of the book, and Jett portrays Jane. U.S. Bombs singer Duane Peters also has a cameo as young Jane's father.

Jubilee covered the song as the B-side on their first single, "Rebel Hiss" (2008).

In 2012, punk rock band Against Me! performed the song live at Terminal 5 in New York City, with Joan Jett as a guest.

In 2015, Joan Jett covered the song again, with Laura Jane Grace of Against Me! and Miley Cyrus, for Cyrus's Backyard Sessions video series to support the Happy Hippie Foundation, an organization that supports homeless LGBT youth. In the YouTube video of their performance, Cyrus sings backing vocals, and Grace and Jett both have solos.

In 2015, Ezra Furman covered the song. Furman discovered the song after Patrick Stickles, the frontman of Titus Andronicus, declared that it was his favourite song. The cover was released in 2019 on her album Songs by Others, a Record Store Day exclusive extended play.

In 2017, the lead singer of Beach Slang, James Alex, released a cover of the song under the moniker Quiet Slang, the "acoustic alter ego of Beach Slang". The cover appeared on the EP We Were Babies & We Were Dirtbags along with a cover of "Thirteen" by Big Star, and two other songs.

In 2022, Nation of Language covered the song and released it as a standalone single.

In 2026, Jenny On Holiday, who is Jenny Hollingsworth from Let's Eat Grandma, covered the song as part of her album Quicksand Heart: Extra Baggage.

== Charts ==
Crash Test Dummies version

Chart	Peak position
Australia (ARIA)	198
Canadian RPM 100	73
