= Light of Day (song) =

Song by Bruce Springsteen

"Light of Day", sometimes written as "(Just Around the Corner to the) Light of Day", is a song written by Bruce Springsteen and performed initially by Joan Jett and Michael J. Fox with their fictitious band The Barbusters in the film Light of Day (1987). The song has since become a staple in Jett's concerts.

The song appeared on the Light of Day soundtrack album. As a single, it reached number 33 on the Billboard Hot 100 in April 1987, and it was credited to The Barbusters (Joan Jett and The Blackhearts) on the record label. It received additional album-oriented rock airplay due to its Jett and Springsteen connection. A music video featuring The Barbusters performing the song, interspersed with numerous scenes from the rest of the film, was popular on MTV. The song has also appeared on several Jett compilation albums.

In 2011 American Songwriter named "Light of Day" their Favorite Movie Song.

== Lyrics ==
"Light of Day" is a powerful guitar-driven, roadhouse-flavored stomper that features Springsteen's usual automotive imagery and includes some of his heartland rock sentiments as well as some of the film's sensibility:

Well, I've been out of the woods for six days and nights now
And I'm a little hot wired but I'm feeling all right now
I got some money in my pocket and I won't need a ride, yeah!
I gotta make it down to Galveston by Saturday night, yeah

Well, I'm a little down under but I'm feeling okay
And I got a little lost down along the way
Well, I'm just around the corner till the light of day, yeah

The song's lyrics focus on the quest for happiness amidst life's difficult circumstances, told through the eyes of a person driving and traveling the nation and world in search of something better, only to find that it really existed at home all along.

== Song's inspiration and use by Springsteen ==
The tale is told that Springsteen donated the song to film director Paul Schrader as loose payment for his having appropriated Schrader's working title for this film for the song "Born in the U.S.A." The song was originally written for the Born in the U.S.A. album, and recorded by Springsteen in 1983. That version remains unreleased.

Springsteen subsequently featured "Light of Day" heavily in his own concerts; it showed up during his 1987 Jersey Shore club appearances, then served as the main set closer throughout his 1988 Tunnel of Love Express, 1992-1993 "Other Band", 1995 (six shows with Joe Grushecky and the Houserockers in a band featuring Springsteen on lead guitar and occasional lead vocal) and 1999-2000 Reunion Tours. Two such performances were captured in the 1993 In Concert/MTV Plugged and 2000 Live in New York City videos and albums, but any particular rendering could be extended to arbitrary length via Springsteen raps, vamps, stage hijinks, and false endings.

The song has rarely been performed since The Rising Tour, where it only appeared one time — on the last day of the tour. It was played four times on the 2007-2008 Magic Tour and eleven times on the 2012-2013 Wrecking Ball World Tour. It made a more permanent return on the High Hopes Tour in 2014, where it resumed its traditional position as set closer. It was performed a few times in 2015 by Springsteen and one time on The River Tour 2016 with special guests Joe and Johnny Grushecky. On June 29, 2017 it was performed together again on the stage of the Canadian National Arts Center, for the public induction of Michael J. Fox in the Governor General's performing arts awards 2017. On March 31, 2024, the song opened Springsteen and the E Street Band's show in San Francisco on their 2023-2024 tour marking the first time Springsteen had performed it with the E Street Band since 2016.
