= Blackheart Records =

American record label

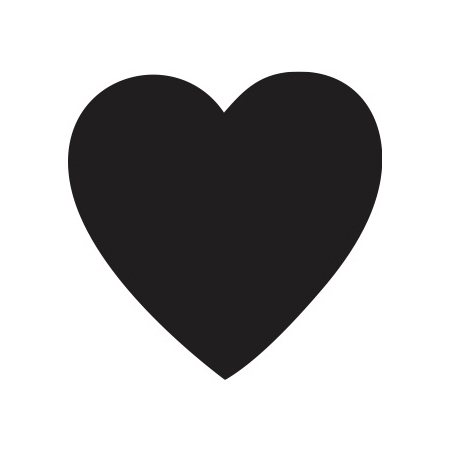
- Founded: 1980
- Founder: Joan Jett, Kenny Laguna
- Distributor: Legacy Recordings
- Genre: Rock
- Country of origin: U.S.
- Location: New York City
- Official website: blackheart.com

Blackheart Records is an American record label founded by rock musicians Joan Jett and Kenny Laguna. Artists include the Eyeliners, Girl in a Coma, the Cute Lepers, the Dollyrots, the Vacancies, Fea, Jackknife Stiletto, L7, and Joan Jett & the Blackhearts.

== History ==
Six of Jett's Top 40 hits were released on Blackheart Records. "I Hate Myself for Loving You" from 1988 placed highest in the charts.

During most of the 1990s, while it was under distribution by Mercury/PolyGram Records, the label ventured into hip hop music and released albums by artists including Big Daddy Kane and Professor Griff.

== Studio albums released ==
Album	Year	Artist
Joan Jett	1980	Joan Jett & the Blackhearts
Album	1983	Joan Jett & the Blackhearts
Glorious Results of a Misspent Youth	1984	Joan Jett & the Blackhearts
Good Music	1986	Joan Jett & the Blackhearts
Up Your Alley	1988	Joan Jett & the Blackhearts
Notorious	1991	Joan Jett & the Blackhearts
Hanging in the Balance	1993	Metal Church
The Characters	1994	The Characters
Evil Stig (with the Gits)	1995	Joan Jett & the Blackhearts
Veteranz Day	1997	Big Daddy Kane
Blood of the Profit	1998	Professor Griff
Muta in Dub	1998	Mutabaruka
H.W.O. Harlem World Order	1999	DJ S&S
Naked	2004	Joan Jett & the Blackhearts
No Apologies	2005	The Eyeliners
Sinner	2006	Joan Jett & the Blackhearts
Because I'm Awesome	2007	The Dollyrots
Both Before I'm Gone	2007	Girl in a Coma
Can't Stand Modern Music	2008	The Cute Lepers
Trio B.C.	2009	Girl in a Coma
Adventures in Coverland	2010	Girl in a Coma
A Little Messed Up	2010	The Dollyrots
Exits & All The Rest	2011	Girl in a Coma
Unvarnished	2013	Joan Jett & the Blackhearts
FEA	2016	FEA
Chronicles of Jane, Vol. 1	2017	Jackknife Stiletto
Chronicles of Jane, Vol. 2	2018	Jackknife Stiletto
Scatter the Rats	2019	L7
