= Thommy Price =

American musician (1956–2025)

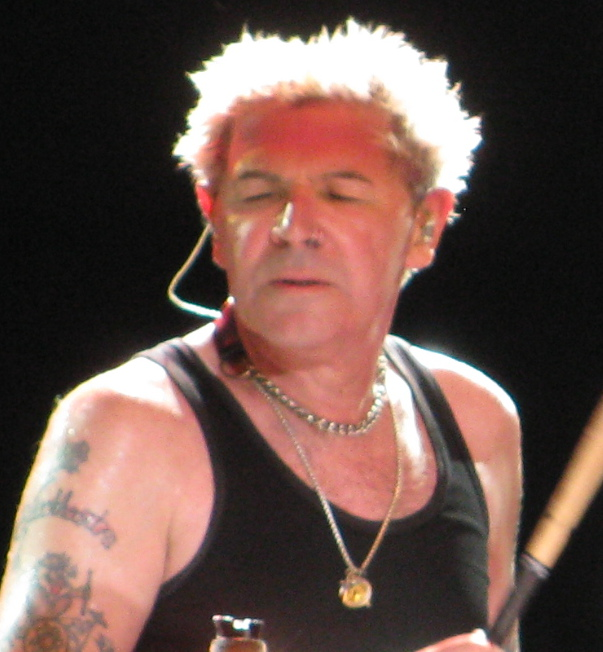
- Price performing in 2010

Background information
- Born: Thomas Price; December 9, 1956; Brooklyn, New York, U.S.
- Died: October 8, 2025 (aged 68)
- Genres: Rock; pop rock
- Occupation: Drummer
- Instruments: Drums; guitar
- Formerly of: Scandal; Love Crushed Velvet; Joan Jett and the Blackhearts
- Website: thommyprice.com

Thomas Price (December 9, 1956 – October 10, 2025) was an American musician. He played drums in Scandal and Blue Öyster Cult, performed with Billy Idol's band and, with Joan Jett and the Blackhearts, Price was the longest serving member besides Joan Jett herself. Price was an in-demand session drummer and played on albums for Debbie Harry, Roger Daltrey, the Waterboys, Ronnie Spector, the Psychedelic Furs, and Blue Öyster Cult.

== Life and career ==
Thomas Price was born on December 9, 1956 in Brooklyn, New York.

By 16 he was already on the road playing drums. One of his first substantial gigs was playing drums for the band Scandal. He performed on Warrior (1984), a Scandal album, before working with Billy Idol. In 1986, he started drumming for Joan Jett and the Blackhearts and he was a member of the band for more than 28 years.

On the side, Price formed a band, Price/Sulton, with his childhood friend and music partner Kasim Sulton from Staten Island. They co-wrote the songs and Price played guitar and contributed vocals. They released an album on CBS Records called Lights On. Their song "No T.V. No Phone" was featured in The Allnighter (1987) starring Susanna Hoffs from the Bangles.

Price drummed in his own band in New York City. The band recorded an EP, Sex, Drums & Rock ’n’ Roll and some of the songs were featured in the soundtrack of Sweet Life, a film with Joan Jett. He featured on the track "RnR's Demise (Has Been Greatly Exaggerated)" from a 2025 solo album called NYC Made by Ricky Byrd, a former guitarist of Joan Jett and the Blackhearts.

Price died on October 10, 2025, at the age of 68.

== Band activity ==
- Joan Jett and the Blackhearts (1986–2025)
- Love Crushed Velvet (2007–2025)
- Billy Idol
- Mink DeVille (Coup de Grâce, 1981; Live at Montreux 1982 DVD, 2008)
- Scandal (1982–1984, 2004–2005)
- David Drew Band
- Chris DeMarco (1979–1984)
- Eddie Money

== Studio work ==
- Peter Wolf
- Enrique Iglesias
- Frank Wright
- The Waterboys
- Debbie Harry
- Roger Daltrey
- Ric Ocasek
- Ronnie Spector
- Blue Öyster Cult
- The Psychedelic Furs
- Mink DeVille
- Ron Wood
- Steve Lukather
- John Waite
- Sylvester
- Cycle Sluts from Hell
- Spread Eagle
- Michael Monroe
- D. L. Byron
- Steve Stevens
- Batusis
- Mark Duda
- Chris DeMarco

== Discography ==
- Lights On – Price/Sulton (1986)
- Sex Drums & Rock 'n' Roll (2002)
- That's Amore (2007)
