= Slik (album) =

Studio album by Slik
- Released: 1976
- Recorded: 1975–1976
- Genre: Glam rock, pop, disco, funk, soft rock
- Label: Bell
- Producer: Phil Coulter in association with Bill Martin

Singles from Slik
- 1. "Forever and Ever" Released: 1975; 2. "Requiem" Released: 1976; 3. "The Kid's a Punk" Released: 1976; 4. "Dancerama" Released: 1977

Professional ratings
Review scores
Source	Rating
Allmusic	link

Slik is the only studio album of 1970s Scottish teenybop band Slik.

Following the Bay City Rollers style, plus the ballads and pop of the time, Slik released two hit singles before the album, "Forever And Ever" in 1975, and "Requiem" in 1976, which oriented the band to the success and recognition in their native Scotland. At the end of 1976, punk rock emerged, and bands of the latter genre became popular, decreasing the popularity of established progressive or glam groups bands like Slik. Possibly for these reasons, the album was not well received.

The band continued until early 1977, when Jim McGinlay left the band, being replaced by Russell Webb (later in The Skids and Public Image Ltd.), and the new line-up left the 1970s disco, soft and pop rock-oriented genre, moving to punk and changing the name to PVC2. The band released one single, "Put You in the Picture". Shortly afterwards, they disbanded, and Kenny Hyslop, Billy McIsaac and Russell Webb formed The Zones. Midge Ure moved to London and worked with Rich Kids, along ex-Sex Pistols Glen Matlock and future Visage bandmate Rusty Egan.

In 2007, 7T’s Records re-released the album on CD, adding bonus tracks.

== Track listing ==
All tracks are written by Phil Coulter and Bill Martin; except where noted

Original LP
No.	Title	Writer(s)	Length
1.	"Dancerama"		5:44
2.	"Darlin'"	Billy McIsaac	4:06
3.	"Bom-Bom"	Exuma, Remo (or Reno)	3:20
4.	"Better Than I Do"		4:50
5.	"Forever and Ever"		3:37
6.	"Requiem"		4:54
7.	"Do It Again"	Midge Ure	2:54
8.	"When Will I Be Loved"	Phil Everly	4:01
9.	"Day By Day"	McIsaac	2:52
10.	"No We Won't Forget You"	Jim McGinlay	5:17

Bonus tracks on CD reissue
No.	Title	Writer(s)	Length
11.	"Boogiest Band in Town"		3:08
12.	"Hatchet"		2:21
13.	"Again My Love"	McGinlay	3:13
14.	"Everyday Anyway"	Kenny Hyslop	2:24
15.	"The Kid's a Punk"		4:05
16.	"Slik Shuffle"		2:24
17.	"Don't Take Your Love Away"		4:01
18.	"This Side Up"	McIsaac	2:57
19.	"I Wanna Be Loved"	McGinlay	2:35
20.	"It's Only a Matter of Time"	Herbie Flowers, Tony Kelly	2:53
21.	"No Star"	McIsaac	3:35
22.	"The Getaway"	Robert Scott	3:11

== Charts ==
Chart (1976)	Peak position
Australia (Kent Music Report)	54
United Kingdom (Official Charts Company)	58

== Personnel ==
- Midge Ure - lead vocals, guitar
- Jim McGinlay - bass guitar
- Billy McIsaac - keyboards
- Kenny Hyslop - drums
