= Boogiest Band In Town =

"Boogiest Band in Town"

Single by Slik
- B-side: "Hatchet"
- Released: Early 1975
- Genre: Glam rock
- Label: Polydor Records
- Songwriter(s): Bill Martin, Phil Coulter
- Producer(s): Bill Martin, Phil Coulter

Slik singles chronology
"Boogiest Band in Town" (1975)	"Forever and Ever" (1975)

"Boogiest Band in Town" is the debut single by Scottish glam rock band Slik. This was the first single and recording released by Midge Ure, singer and guitarist of the band, formed also by drummer Kenny Hyslop, bassist Jim McGinlay and keyboardist Billy McIsaac. The single was released in the first months of 1975, being released by Polydor. However the song did not chart, but the band was featured playing the song in the glam rock movie Never Too Young To Rock, the same year.

Slik were, formerly known by another name, Salvation, and were a popular local band, who played throughout Scotland. Salvation had one more member, Kevin McGinlay, brother of bassist Jim McGinlay, who left to follow a solo career in 1974; and without him, the band changed their name to Slik and signed a contract with Bay City Rollers' songwriters, Bill Martin and Phil Coulter. Martin & Coulter had just recently split with the Bay City Rollers and were looking for another Rollers type band. They struck big beginning with the second single, "Forever And Ever".

At the time of this single however, the band had another look, very different from the baseball shirts and short haired look which characterised them later. This was a more glam style, with a long-haired Ure, Kenny Hyslop with his Bryan Ferry/Elvis Presley type quiff, while McGinlay and McIsaac had more elegant clothes; that can be seen in the Never Too Young To Rock movie and the promo photos at the time.

Midge Ure was then 21 years old, and in the future he became an important figure of new wave music, as frontman of Ultravox, then called Tiger Lily and led by Dennis Leigh, later known as John Foxx and a successful electronic musician, who he replaced in 1979.

The song was later used as the theme song of the Arrows show, a weekly TV pop series in the UK hosted by the band Arrows on the Granada / ITV network. It was recorded by the band Arrows as the b-side of their 6th single "Once Upon A Time" (RAK 231) and released on their album First Hit in 1976 on Mickie Most's RAK records. The Arrows version was also produced by Phil Coulter.

== Track listing ==
- A-Side: Boogiest Band in Town
- B-Side: Hatchet

== Personnel ==
- Midge Ure: lead vocals and guitars
- Jim McGinlay: bass
- Billy McIsaac: keyboards
- Kenny Hyslop: drums
