= Under Influence =

Studio album by Zones
- Released: June 1, 1979
- Recorded: The Manor (mixed at Wessex Studios)
- Genre: New wave
- Label: Arista
- Producer: Tim Friese-Greene

Zones chronology
Slik as Slik (1976)	Under Influence (1979)

Singles from Under Influence
- 1. "Looking to the Future" Released: May 24, 1979; 2. "Mourning Star" Released: July 20, 1979

Professional ratings
Review scores
Source	Rating
ARTIST direct	4.5/5 stars

Under Influence, released by Arista Records on June 1, 1979, is the only album of new wave band Zones, an offshoot of Midge Ure’s pre-Rich Kids Scottish pop outfit, Slik. The album is described in Trouser Press as the band "try a little of everything ... without any forceful, unifying personality".

Although the album has the new wave sound, it was unsuccessful at the time of its release. Shortly afterwards, Zones released a 7" single called "Mourning Star", whose eponymous song (a shorter version of the album song) was backed with "Under Influence", which did not appear on the album, despite the name being the same. At the end of 1979, and after years of failures, the group split up.

== Track listing ==
=== Original LP (1981) ===
All tracks are written by Willie Gardner; except where noted

Side one
No.	Title	Writer(s)	Length
1.	"Do It All Again"		2:53
2.	"Vision On"		3:45
3.	"Deadly Dolls"	Russell Webb	2:48
4.	"The End"		3:58
5.	"Mainman"	Billy McIsaac	4:35

Side two
No.	Title	Writer(s)	Length
1.	"You're Not Foolin' Me"	McIsaac	2:44
2.	"Anything Goes"	McIsaac	3:16
3.	"Strength to Strength"		3:20
4.	"Looking to the Future"	McIsaac	3:21
5.	"Mourning Star"		4:31

== Personnel ==
- Willie Gardner - lead vocals, guitar
- Billy McIsaac - keyboards, vocals
- Russell Webb - bass, vocals
- Kenny Hyslop - drums, percussion
