= Stuck with You (Zones song) =

Single by Zones
- A-side: "Stuck with You"
- B-side: "No Angels"
- Released: 17 February 1978
- Genre: Punk rock, power pop
- Label: Zoom

Zones singles chronology
"Stuck with You" (1978)	"Sign of the Times" (1978)

"Stuck with You" is the debut single by punk band Zones, released by Zoom Records on February 17, 1978.

It was backed with "No Angels"; both songs were a combination of punk rock and power pop, although more punk than the group's subsequent singles and the album, which were more new wave-oriented.

The single was played a lot by DJ John Peel, who shortly afterwards recorded and broadcast sessions with the band, and garnered the attention of Arista Records, who signed the group.

The band comprised vocalist and guitarist Willie Gardner (previously in Hot Valves), and ex-PVC2 members, bassist Russell Webb, keyboardist Billy McIsaac and drummer Kenny Hyslop. Their next single, "Sign of the Times" was released shortly afterwards on Arista Records.

== Track listing ==
A. "Stuck with You"
B. "No Angels"

== Personnel ==
- Willie Gardner: lead vocals, lead guitar
- Russell Webb: bass guitar
- Billy McIsaac: keyboards
- Kenny Hyslop: drums
