= Kenny (band) =

English pop and glam rock band

- Origin: London, England
- Genres: Pop, rock, glam rock, bubblegum pop
- Years active: 1974–1979
- Labels: RAK, Polydor
- Past members: Rick Driscoll; Yan Stile; Chris Redburn; Chris Lacklison; Andy Walton

Kenny was an English pop, rock and glam rock band that formed in London in 1974. They had several hit singles in the UK in the mid-1970s, including "The Bump" and "Fancy Pants".

== History ==
In 1973, Irish showband singer Tony Kenny, former lead singer with The Sands and The Vampires, recorded a single, "Heart of Stone", written by Bill Martin and Phil Coulter, and produced by Mickie Most. It was released under the name Kenny, and, after the singer returned to Ireland, the single became a hit in Britain, as did a follow-up release, "Give It to Me Now".

Most then decided to capitalise on their success by renaming a completely unconnected Enfield band, named Chuff, as Kenny. Former child actor Keith Chegwin was considered as lead singer but he declined. Martin and Coulter wrote the bulk of the successful songs for the group, starting with "The Bump", which reached the Top 3 in the UK Singles Chart. They had three further records reach that chart in the UK: "Fancy Pants", "Baby I Love You, OK!", and "Julie Anne". The band were at one stage managed by John Morris, the husband of singer Clodagh Rodgers.

Uncredited lead and backing vocals on "The Bump" were performed by Barry Palmer.

In 1989, lead singer Rick Driscoll played lead guitar for Steve Harley and Cockney Rebel as part of Steve Harley's comeback tour, aptly named "The Come Back, All Is Forgiven Tour". The show at Northampton's Derngate Theatre in June 1989 was released on home video later that year. Driscoll was replaced by Robbie Gladwell in 1990, who continued to play lead guitar for Harley until the latter's death. In 1996, Rick Driscoll also appeared on the 'Identity Parade', on the BBC Television programme Never Mind the Buzzcocks. Since 2006, Driscoll has operated a yacht charter business based in Corfu, Greece. Sail Blue Planet: Skippered Yacht Charters & Sailing Holidays

== Members ==
- Rick Driscoll — vocals, guitar, born 1 May 1957 in Enfield
- Yan Stile (born Ian Stile) — guitar, born 16 January 1955 in Enfield
- Chris Redburn — bass, born 14 March 1956 in Enfield
- Chris Lacklison — keyboards, born 15 October 1956 in London
- Andy Walton — drums, born 1 October 1956 in Enfield

== Discography ==
=== Albums ===
- 1975 - The Sound of Super K (RAK), UK No. 56, GER No. 38
- 1976 - Ricochet (Polydor) (Germany/Japan only)

=== Singles ===
Year	A-Side	B-Side	Label	Peak chart positions				
Year	A-Side	B-Side	Label	AUS	BE	GER	IRE	UK
1974	"The Bump" (Bill Martin-Phil Coulter)	"Forget the Janes, the Jeans and the Might Have Beens" (Bill Martin-Phil Coulter)	RAK 186	71	30	19	2	3
1975	"Fancy Pants" (Bill Martin-Phil Coulter)	"I'm a Winner" (Bill Martin-Phil Coulter)	RAK 196	—	—	14	3	4
1975	"Baby I Love You, OK!" (Bill Martin-Phil Coulter)	"The Sound of Super K" (Bill Martin-Phil Coulter)	RAK 207	—	—	21	9	12
1975	"Julie Anne" (Bill Martin-Phil Coulter)	"Dancin' Feet" (Rick Driscoll, Yan Style)	RAK 214	6	—	14	10	10
1975	"Nice to Have You Home" (Bill Martin-Phil Coulter)	"Happiness Melissa" (Rick Driscoll, Yan Style)	RAK 225	—	—	30	—	—
1976	"Hot Lips" (Anthony Craig, Edward Adamberry)	"Bangin' My Head Against a Brick Wall" (Rick Driscoll, Yan Style)	Polydor	—	—	20	20	—
1976	"Red Headed Lady" (Tony Macaulay-Roger Greenaway)	"Alone Together" (Rick Driscoll, Yan Style)	Polydor	—	—	49	—	—
1977	"Old Songs Never Die" (Tony Macaulay-Roger Greenaway)	"Don't Hold On" (Rick Driscoll, Yan Style)	Polydor	—	—	—	—	—
1979	"Reach Out I'll Be There" (Brian Holland, Lamont Dozier)	"Time Is the Healer" (Nash, Style)	Decca	—	—	—	—	—

==== List of songs recorded by Kenny ====
- The column **Song** list the song title; **bold** means released as a single.
- The column **Writer(s)** lists who wrote the song.
- The column **Time** shows its length.
- The column **Album** lists the album the song is featured on.
- The column **Producer** lists the producer of the song.
- The column **Year** lists the year in which the song was released.

Song	Writer(s)	Time	Producer	Album	Year	Other
"Alone Together"	Rick Driscoll, Yan Style	3:14	Miki Dallon	Ricochet	1976	B-side of "Red Headed Lady"
**"Baby I Love You, OK!"**	Bill Martin-Phil Coulter	3:54	Bill Martin-Phil Coulter	The Sound of Super K	1975	A-side of "The Sound of Super K"
"Bangin' My Head Against a Brick Wall"	Rick Driscoll, Yan Style	3:22	Miki Dallon	The Singles Collection Plus...	1976	B-side of "Hot Lips"
"Be My Girl"	Andy Walton, Chris Redburn	2:13	Miki Dallon	Ricochet	1976	
"Dancin' Feet"	Rick Driscoll, Yan Style	3:00	Bill Martin-Phil Coulter	The Singles Collection Plus...	1975	B-side of "Julie Anne"
"Don't Hold On"	Rick Driscoll, Yan Style	2:59	Edward Adamberry	none	1977	B-side of "Old Songs Never Die"
"End of a Love Affair"	Yan Style	3:03	Miki Dallon	Ricochet	1976	
**"Fancy Pants"**	Bill Martin-Phil Coulter	3:24	Bill Martin-Phil Coulter	The Sound of Super K	1975	A-side of "I'm a Winner"
"Forever and Ever"	Bill Martin-Phil Coulter	3:30	Bill Martin-Phil Coulter	The Sound of Super K	1975	UK No. 1 for Slik
"Forget the Janes, the Jeans and the Might Have Beens"	Bill Martin-Phil Coulter	3:11	Bill Martin-Phil Coulter	The Singles Collection Plus...	1975	B-side of "The Bump"
"Glad, Glad, Glad"	Rick Driscoll, Yan Style	3:59	Bill Martin-Phil Coulter	The Sound of Super K	1975	
"Go into Hiding"	Yan Style	3:07	Miki Dallon	Ricochet	1976	
"Happiness Melissa"	Rick Driscoll, Yan Style	2:29	Bill Martin-Phil Coulter	The Singles Collection Plus...	1975	B-side of "Nice to Have You Home"
"Hey! Mr. Dream Seller"	Rick Driscoll, Yan Style	3:14	Bill Martin-Phil Coulter	The Sound of Super K	1975	
"Hot Lips"	Anthony Craig, Edward Adamberry	2:53	Miki Dallon	Ricochet	1976	A-side of "Bangin' My Head Against a Brick Wall"
"I Won't Cry"	Rick Driscoll, Yan Style	4:02	Miki Dallon	Ricochet	1976	
"I'm a Winner"	Bill Martin-Phil Coulter	3:09	Bill Martin-Phil Coulter	The Singles Collection Plus...	1975	B-side of "Fancy Pants"
"I'm Coming Home"	Rick Driscoll, Yan Style	2:58	Miki Dallon	Ricochet	1976	
**"Julie Anne"**	Bill Martin-Phil Coulter	2:59	Bill Martin-Phil Coulter	The Sound of Super K	1975	A-side of "Dancin' Feet"
"Just a Word Away"	Bill Martin-Phil Coulter		Bill Martin-Phil Coulter	The Sound of Super K	1975	
"Little Darlin'"	Maurice Williams	4:15	Bill Martin-Phil Coulter	The Sound of Super K	1975	
"Long Lost Summers"	Rick Driscoll, Yan Style	3:08	Bill Martin-Phil Coulter	The Sound of Super K	1975	
"Make Up, Break Up"	Andy Walton, Yan Style	2:59	Miki Dallon	Ricochet	1976	
"Memories"	Rick Driscoll, Yan Style		Bill Martin-Phil Coulter	The Sound of Super K	1975	
**"Nice to Have You Home"**	Bill Martin-Phil Coulter	3:43	Bill Martin-Phil Coulter	The Sound of Super K	1975	A-side of "Happiness Melissa"
"Old Songs Never Die"	Tony Macaulay-Roger Greenaway	3:16	Edward Adamberry	none	1977	A-side of "Don't Hold On"
"Reach Out I'll Be There"	Brian Holland, Lamont Dozier	3:13	Kenny & Gwen Mathias	none	1979	A-side of "Time Is the Healer"
"Red Headed Lady"	Tony Macaulay-Roger Greenaway	2:30	Miki Dallon	Ricochet	1976	A-side of "Alone Together"
**"The Bump"**	Bill Martin-Phil Coulter	2:33	Bill Martin-Phil Coulter	The Sound of Super K	1974	A-side of "Forget the Janes, the Jeans and the Might Have Beens"
"The Sound of Super K"	Bill Martin-Phil Coulter	3:14	Bill Martin-Phil Coulter	The Singles Collection Plus...	1975	B-side of "Baby I Love You, OK!"
"Time Is the Healer"	Nash, Style	3:03	Kenny & Gwen Mathias	none	1979	B-side of "Reach Out (I'll Be There)"
"You Wrote the Words"	Andy Walton, Yan Style	2:49	Miki Dallon	Ricochet	1976	
"When You Dance, I Can Really Love"	Neil Young ?		unknown	none	1979	not published
"(Your Love Has Lifted Me) Higher and Higher"	Carl Smith, Gary Jackson, Raynard Miner	4:22	Miki Dallon	Ricochet	1976	

==== Cover songs ====
Song	Writer(s)	Original artist	Album	Year	Other
"Little Darlin'"	Maurice Williams	The Gladiolas		1957	
"Reach Out I'll Be There"	Brian Holland, Lamont Dozier	Four Tops	Reach Out	1967	
"The Bump"	Bill Martin-Phil Coulter	Bay City Rollers	Rock 'N' Rollers: The Best of Bay City Rollers	1974	Originally as the B-side of their October 1974 hit, "All of Me Loves All of You"
"(Your Love Has Lifted Me) Higher and Higher"	Carl Smith, Gary Jackson, Raynard Miner	Jackie Wilson	Higher and Higher	1967	

==== Kenny songs covered by others ====
Song	Writer(s)	First artist	Name	Album	Year	Other
"Forever and Ever"	Bill Martin-Phil Coulter	a) Slik b) Peter Orloff Sound Orchester c) Michael Born d) Délizia e) Jean Guinéa f) Pippis g) Bobby Vinton h) Terrorvision i) Motown Corps	a) Forever and Ever b) Forever and Ever (instrumental) c) Ich will dir für immer gehören (German) d) Le procès de l'amour e) Des tonnes de soleil f) Det måste vara kärlek (Swedish) g) Forever and Ever h) Forever and Ever i) Forever and Ever	a) Slik b) Disco Hits Instrumental c) none d) none e) none f) Fyllda Segel! g) none h) The Essential Terrorvision i) none	a) 1975 b) 1976 c) 1976 d) 1978 e) 1978 f) 1978 g) 1981 h) 1997 h) unknown	
"Julie Anne"	Bill Martin-Phil Coulter	a) James Last b) Billy Larkin c) Tonix	a) Julie Anne b) Julie Anne c) Juliet (Swedish)	a) Non Stop Dancing 1976 b) Uptown Country c) Shang-A-Lang	a) 1975 b) 1976 c) 1976	

== See also ==
- List of performances on Top of the Pops
- Bump (dance)
