= Put You in the Picture =

EP by PVC2
- Released: 30 August 1977
- Recorded: 1977
- Genre: Punk rock
- Label: Zoom Records

Slik singles chronology
"It's Only a Matter of Time" (1977)

Zones singles chronology
"Stuck with You" (1978)

"Put You in the Picture" is a song written by Russell Webb, and performed by his group PVC2. The song was released on 30 August 1977 by Zoom Records, in an EP which was the last recording of Midge Ure with the remaining members of Slik, who later resurged as Zones, with another singer and guitarist, Willie Gardner.

In August 2006, Ryan Foley listed the single as #8 in his top 10 list of Scottish punk singles in Stylus Magazine. Foley declared that "'Pain' is thundering and thrashy, and heavily inspired by contemporary acts such as the Clash. Ure's vocals on the chorus feature all the gusto of a medieval torturer, and are a far cry from the saccharine tunes he was doing just 18 months earlier" (in reference to Ure's vocal style in Slik).

== Track listing ==
1. "Put You in the Picture" (Russell Webb) (on the original label the writer credits were mistakenly attributed to Midge Ure/Billy McIsaac)
2. "Pain" (Billy McIsaac)
3. "Deranged Demented & Free" (Kenny Hyslop)
