= Watertower West =

The Watertower West were an American band, based in New York, who were regular players at the Cafe Wha?, Greenwich Village from 1966 to 1968.

The members were Carl Peachman (drums), Alan Merrill (lead guitar, vocals), Jake Hooker (second guitar), and James "Bucky" Hall (bass, vocals).

Merrill and Hooker later formed Arrows in London, England. Peachman went on to be an agent for the bands Big Brother and the Holding Company, and Moby Grape. James "Bucky" Hall is currently playing with his long time Boston based band, The Moonlighters.
