= Délizia =

Italian-Belgian singer (1952–2020)

- Born: June 23, 1952; Mons, Belgium
- Died: February 9, 2020 (aged 67)
- Other name: Adamo
- Occupation: Singer
- Years active: 1966–1967; 1974–1984
- Parent: Antonio Adamo
- Relatives: Salvatore Adamo (brother)

Délizia Adamo better known mononymously as Délizia (June 23, 1952 – February 9, 2020) was a singer of Italian–Belgian origin and sister of international singer Salvatore Adamo.

She had her debut single "Prend le chien" at age 14. It was written by her brother Adamo. She followed courses in drawing and took part in a comedy production at Théatre de l'Ancre in Charleroi, where she interpreted Kataeiv's "Je veux voir Moscou". She also followed dramatic arts courses at the Royal Conservatory of Brussels.

In 1974, Salvatore Adamo wrote her some songs releasing "Qui te retient" and "Aime-moi" as singles. The next year, she took part in some of his tours. In 1976 and again in 1978, she participated in pre-selections for the Belgian entry to Eurovision Song Contest but without success. She had a comeback in 1982 with "Une première danse", a song co-written by Michel Legrand and Charles Aznavour.

== Discography ==
=== EP ===
- 1966: A1 : "Prends le chien" (S. Adamo) / A2 : "Monsieur le professeur" (S. Adamo) / B1 : "J'ai rendez-vous" (S. Adamo) / B2 : "Laissons passer les années" (S. Adamo)

=== Singles ===
(Side A and Side B, writer in parentheses)

- 1974: "Qui te retient?" – (S. Adamo) / "Aime-moi" – (S. Adamo)
- 1975: "Vivre avec toi" – (S. Adamo) / "Bye bye love" – (S. Adamo)
- 1975: "Alors, le bel été" – (S. Adamo) / "Je te suivrai" – (S. Adamo)
- 1976: "Un hiver avec toi" – (Didier Barbelivien, V. Paradiso) / "Ma prière" – (Roby Facchinetti, Patrick Loiseau, Valerio Negrini)
- 1976: "Le procès de l'amour" – (Phil Coulter, Bill Martin, Christian Ravasco) / "Le temps pardonne" – (Óscar Gómez, Michel Jouveaux)
- 1977: "Du côté de l’amour" – (C. Lee, G. Allun Michel, T. Boyce) / "Reviens" – (J. Keller, M. Jouveaux, P. Vance)
- 1978: "Qui viendra réinventer l’amour?" - (S. Adamo) / "Comme un feu qui dort (Alors le bel été)" - (S. Adamo)
