= Stephen Lennon =

Stephen Lennon may refer to:

- Stephen Lennon, guitarist in The Questions
- Stephen Yaxley-Lennon, better known as Tommy Robinson, former leader of the English Defence League
- Steven Lennon, Scottish footballer
