= Forever and Ever (Slik song) =

Single by Slik

from the album Slik
- B-side: "Again My Love"
- Released: 1975
- Genre: Glam rock, progressive rock
- Label: Bell Records
- Songwriter(s): Bill Martin, Phil Coulter and Jim McGinlay (B-Side)
- Producer(s): Bill Martin, Phil Coulter

Slik singles chronology
"Boogiest Band in Town" (1975)	"Forever and Ever" (1975)	"Requiem" (1976)

Alternative cover

"Forever and Ever" is a UK number-one single by Scottish glam rock band Slik, released in 1975. It was number one for one week in February 1976, knocking ABBA's "Mamma Mia" off the number-one position. It was also a hit in Ireland, reaching number two on the charts there. The song was written by the songwriting partnership of Bill Martin and Phil Coulter who had recently stopped writing for the Bay City Rollers.

== History ==
"Forever And Ever" was originally recorded by Kenny, appearing on their 1975 debut LP The Sound Of Super K. Slik covered the song with a heavier arrangement after the Bay City Rollers had refused it.

The song was the band's only UK number-one single, and their only UK top 20 hit. Their Top of the Pops performance of the song was lead singer Midge Ure's first television appearance; he went on to success with Ultravox and as a solo artist.

The single reached number 2 in the Netherlands and the Top 30 in Germany. In 1976, EMI Electrola released a German edition of the single.

After another hit, and a flop, the band disbanded in early 1977.

== Track listing ==
- A-side: "Forever and Ever" (Bill Martin/Phil Coulter)
- B-side: "Again My Love" (Jim McGinlay)

== Personnel ==
- Midge Ure: lead vocals, guitar.
- Jim McGinlay: bass.
- Billy McIsaac: piano, guitar.
- Kenny Hyslop: drums.
- Bill Martin and Phil Coulter: producers.

== Charts ==
=== Weekly charts ===
Chart (1976)	Peak position
Belgium (Ultratop 50 Flanders)	3
Belgium (Ultratop 50 Wallonia)	35
Ireland (IRMA)	2
Netherlands (Dutch Top 40)	2
Netherlands (Single Top 100)	3
UK Singles (OCC)	1
West Germany (GfK)	6

=== Year-end charts ===
Chart (1976)	Position
Belgium (Ultratop Flanders)	54
Netherlands (Dutch Top 40)	34
Netherlands (Single Top 100)	50
West Germany (Official German Charts)	41
