= Willie Gardner =

Scottish musician

- Origin: Scotland
- Genres: Punk rock, post-punk, synthpop, new wave, electronic
- Instruments: Vocals, guitar
- Years active: 1970s–1980s
- Labels: Arista, Cuba Libre

Willie Gardner is a Scottish musician, who formed part of various pop and rock bands in the 1970s and 1980s, playing guitar. He was a cousin of Alex Harvey.

His earliest known band was The Hot Valves, formed in 1976. The band was influenced by Bill Nelson and Mick Ronson, and their name was taken from a Be-Bop Deluxe EP. They were Gardner on guitars and lead vocals, Coling King on drums, and Danny Mitchell on keyboards (the latter two later of Modern Man and Messengers), and split up in 1977.

In 1977, he joined a third band named Zones, composed of drummer Kenny Hyslop, keyboardist Billy McIsaac and bassist Russell Webb, who previously were part of PVC2, along with Midge Ure, who quit and moved to London to form the Rich Kids after the demise of the teenybop band Slik. They released singles including "Stuck with You", "Sign of the Times", "Looking to the Future" and "Mourning Star", and an album called Under Influence (1979), which was unsuccessful, before splitting up.

After Zones, Gardner dedicated himself to a brief solo career, releasing two singles in 1982: "Golden Youth" and "Imation". Then he joined a fledgling Euro disco band, Endgames, with whom released two hits, "First Last for Everything" and "Waiting for Another Chance". The band split up around 1985.

Gardner still resides in Scotland and is currently working as an English teacher in Glasgow.

== Discography ==
For his releases with Zones, see: Discography of Zones
For his releases with Endgames, see: Discography of Endgames

=== Solo singles ===
- "Golden Youth" (Cuba Libre, 1980)
- "Imation" (Cuba Libre)
