= Arrows (British band) =

English-American rock band (1974–1977)

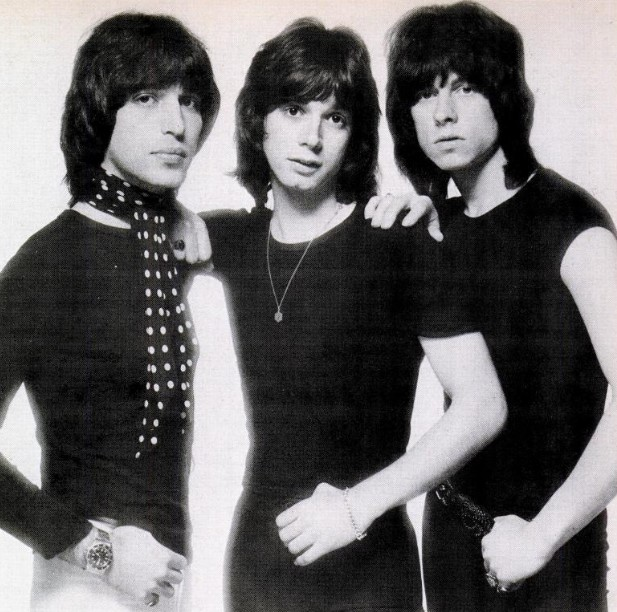
- Arrows in 1974. Left to right: Jake Hooker, Alan Merrill, Paul Varley

Background information
- Origin: London, England
- Genres: Glam rock; pop rock; hard rock
- Years active: 1974–1977
- Label: RAK
- Past members: Alan Merrill; Jake Hooker; Paul Varley; Terry Taylor

The Arrows were an English rock band based in London, England. The group, which formed in 1974 and disbanded in 1977, included 3 members: American singer/bassist Alan Merrill, American guitarist Jake Hooker and English drummer Paul Varley (who had replaced Clive Williams relatively early in the band's history). They had a charting hit singles in 1974 and 1975 with "Touch Too Much" and "My Last Night with You", produced by Mickie Most on RAK Records. They recorded the original version of Merrill's song "I Love Rock 'n' Roll", later covered by Joan Jett & the Blackhearts.

== Career ==
The first manager of The Arrows was Peter Meaden, who had also managed The Who in the early 1960s. He came up with the band's name, which originates from The Who's logo, with the arrow pointing up.

=== Early recordings ===
The Arrows highest reaching chart hit was "Touch Too Much" in 1974 which went to number 2 in the South African charts and was in the top 20 there for 15 weeks.

The band's second single "Toughen Up" made number 51 in the UK chart in 1974. That year Arrows won the Golden Lion award (Belgium) in the "best new band" category and performed at the ceremonies on Belgian television.

Eamonn Carr of later Freddie + The Dreamers/St Cecilia fame toured as piano/keys player for The Arrows live performances.

=== Broadcasting ===
The Arrows had two 14-week television shows in the UK called Arrows in 1976 and 1977, which were broadcast on Granada Television and produced by Muriel Young. They are the only band to have two weekly TV series and no records released during the run of either series; a result of a conflict between the band's manager Ian Wright of the M.A.M. Agency, and the group's mentor/producer Mickie Most. Each series consisted of 14 shows, 30 minutes in length. There were 28 shows broadcast in total. Their final single, "Once Upon a Time", was released one month before the first show of their first series in 1976. Joan Jett became aware of "I Love Rock 'n' Roll" while on tour with her band the Runaways in England in 1976 and saw the group perform the song on their weekly show.

The band's only US TV appearance was on Don Kirshner's Rock Concert in February 1975. They played their UK hits, "Touch Too Much" and "Toughen Up".

=== Post activity ===
Beatles' biographers and editor of 1960s British invasion bible Mersey Beat, Bill Harry wrote his first published book about the Arrows, Arrows : The Official Story, published on Everest books in 1976.

Terry Taylor who joined the band in the autumn of 1976 for the band's second weekly TV series, is currently with Bill Wyman's Rhythm Kings band.

The Arrows song "Moving Next Door to You" (composed by Alan Merrill and Jake Hooker) was used on the BBC1 TV show Homes Under the Hammer series 18, episode 70. The song was the B-side of "My Last Night with You", produced by Mickie Most in 1975. After that, the BBC TV show used the Arrows song "We Can Make It Together" in series 19, episode 53, the b-side of the band's single "Touch Too Much".

The Arrows album First Hit was reissued in Japan on 11 March 2015, with bonus tracks on Warner Brothers Japan.

The Arrows founding band members Paul Varley (1952–2008), Jake Hooker (1953–2014) and Alan Merrill (1951–2020) are all deceased.

== Discography ==
=== Album ===
- First Hit (1976), Rak Records

==== Archival releases ====
- 1998 First Hit (reissue with bonus tracks) – CD
- 2001 Singles Collection Plus
- 2002 Tawny Tracks
- 2004 A's B's and Rarities
- 2015 First Hit (Japanese reissue with bonus tracks)

=== Singles ===
Year	A-side	B-side	Label	Other
1974	"Touch Too Much" (Nicky Chinn / Mike Chapman)	"We Can Make It Together" (Alan Merrill / Jake Hooker)	RAK 171	(UK number 8)
1974	"Toughen Up" (Nicky Chinn / Mike Chapman)	"Diesel Locomotive Dancer" (Alan Merrill / Jake Hooker)	RAK 182	(UK number 54) (Note: Chart position is from the official UK "Breakers List".)
1975	"My Last Night with You" (Roger Ferris)	"Movin' Next Door To You" (Alan Merrill / Jake Hooker)	RAK 189	(UK number 25)
1975	"Broken Down Heart" (Roger Ferris)	"I Love Rock 'n' Roll" (Note: I Love Rock 'n' Roll was written by Merrill alone, but credited to Merrill and Hooker. The same is true of some or all of the Arrows' B-sides.) (Alan Merrill / Jake Hooker)	RAK 205	
1975	"I Love Rock 'n' Roll" (Alan Merrill / Jake Hooker)	"Broken Down Heart" (Roger Ferris)	RAK 205	
1975	"Hard Hearted" (Roger Ferris)	"My World Is Turning On Love" (Alan Merrill / Jake Hooker)	RAK 218	
1976	"Once Upon A Time" (Bill Martin / Phil Coulter)	"Boogiest Band In Town" (Bill Martin / Phil Coulter)	RAK 231	

=== List of songs ===
The following is a sortable table of all songs by Arrows:

Song	Writer(s)	Time	Producer	Album	Year	Other
"A Love Like Ours"	Alan Merrill, Terry Taylor	4:13	unknown	Tawny Tracks	2002	
"Always Another Train"	Alan Merrill, Jake Hooker, Terry Taylor	5:12	Bill Wyman	Tawny Tracks	1977	unpublished
"At The Candy Shop"	Alan Merrill, Bill Wyman	4:13	unknown	Tawny Tracks	2002	
"Baby Doll"	Alan Merrill, Bill Wyman	3:06	unknown	Tawny Tracks	2002	
"Bam Bam Battering Ram"	Alan Merrill, Jake Hooker		Mickie Most	A's, B's, and Rarites	1974	published in 2004
"Basing Street Leslie"	Alan Merrill, Paul Varley, Tetsu Yamauchi	2:06	Bill Wyman	Tawny Tracks	1977	
"Boogiest Band In Town"	Bill Martin, Phil Coulter	3:22	Phil Coulter	First Hit (LP)	1976	B-side of "Once Upon A Time"
"Bring Back The Fire"	Alan Merrill, Jake Hooker, Terry Taylor		unknown	'A's B's & Rarities	1976	
"Broken Down Heart"	Roger Ferris		Mickie Most		1975	B-side of "I Love Rock 'n' Roll"
"Cheating Woman"	Alan Merrill, A.B. David	3:12	unknown	Tawny Tracks	2002	
"Come On, Come On, Baby"	Alan Merrill	3:29	unknown	Tawny Tracks	2002	
"Dare You Not To Dance"	Alan Merrill, Jake Hooker, Terry Taylor	3:08	Bill Wyman	Tawny Tracks	1977	
"Diesel Locomotive Dancer"	Alan Merrill, Jake Hooker	2:42	Mickie Most	First Hit (CD)	1974	B-side of "Toughen Up"
"Don't Worry 'Bout Love"	Alan Merrill, Jake Hooker	3:00	Phil Coulter	First Hit (LP)	1976	
"Dreamin'"	Johnny Burnette	2:33	Mickie Most	A's, B's, and Rarites	1974	published in 2004
"Faith In You"	Alan Merrill, Jake Hooker, Terry Taylor		unknown	A's B's & Rarities	1976–77	published in 2004
"Feel So Good"	Alan Merrill	2:55	Phil Coulter	First Hit (LP)	1976	
"Feelin' this Way"	Alan Merrill, Jake Hooker, Paul Varley	3:20	Phil Coulter	First Hit (LP)	1976	
"First Hit"	Alan Merrill, Jake Hooker	4:22	Phil Coulter	First Hit (LP)	1976	
"French Cheating Woman"	Alan Merrill, A.B. David	4:35	unknown	Tawny Tracks	2002	
"Goodbyes Don't Bother Me"	Alan Merrill, Jake Hooker, Terry Taylor		Bill Wyman	Tawny Tracks	1977	unpublished
"Gotta Be Near You"	Bill Martin, Phil Coulter	3:30	Phil Coulter	First Hit (LP)	1976	
"Hard Hearted"	Roger Ferris	3:18	Mickie Most		1975	A-side of "My World Is Turning On Love"
"Horny Lips"	Alan Merrill	2:42	unknown	Tawny Tracks	2002	
"I Love Rock 'n' Roll"	Alan Merrill, Jake Hooker	2:47	Mickie Most	Tawny Tracks	1975	A-side of "Broken Down Heart"
"International Gypsy Lovers"	Alan Merrill	3:08	unknown	Tawny Tracks	2002	
"Let Me Love You"	Bill Martin, Phil Coulter	3:22	Phil Coulter	First Hit (LP)	1976	
"Love Child"	Craig McLearie, John Laurenson	3:09	Phil Coulter	First Hit (LP)	1976	
"Love Is Easy"	Alan Merrill, Jake Hooker	3:25	Phil Coulter	First Hit (LP)	1976	
"Love Rider"	Alan Merrill, Jake Hooker, Terry Taylor		unknown	A's B's & Rarities	1976	
"Motor Running"	Alan Merrill	3:05	unknown	Tawny Tracks	2002	
"Movin' Next Door To You"	Alan Merrill, Jake Hooker	2:57	Mickie Most		1975	B-side of "My Last Night with You"
"Movin' Next Door To You" (New Version)	Alan Merrill, Jake Hooker		Mickie Most	A's B's & Rarities	2004	
"My Last Night with You"	Roger Ferris	2:31	Mickie Most		1975	A-side of "Movin' Next Door To You"
"My World Is Turning On Love"	Alan Merrill, Jake Hooker	4:23	Mickie Most	First Hit (CD)	1975	B-side of "Hard Hearted"
"Once Upon A Time"	Bill Martin, Phil Coulter	4:28	Phil Coulter	First Hit (LP)	1976	A-side of "Boogiest Band In Town"
"Rock N' Roll Hotel"	Alan Merrill	3:30	unknown	Tawny Tracks	2002	
"Silver Stallion"	Alan Merrill	3:07	unknown	Walk Away Renee	1976	
"Somebody to Love"	Alan Merrill	4:04	unknown	Tawny Tracks	1977	
"Thanks"	Bill Martin, Phil Coulter	4:14	Phil Coulter	First Hit (LP)	1976	
"The Stranger"	Alan Merrill	2:55	unknown	Walk Away Renee	1976	
"Touch Too Much"	Nicky Chinn, Mike Chapman	3:00	Mickie Most		1974	A-side of "We Can Make It Together"
"Toughen Up"	Nicky Chinn, Mike Chapman	2:51	Mickie Most	First Hit (CD)	1974	A-side of "Diesel Locomotive Dancer"
"Wake Up"	Alan Merrill, Jake Hooker		Mickie Most	A's, B's, and Rarites	1974	published in 2004
"Walk Away Renee"	Michael Brown, Bob Calilli, Tony Sansone	2:43	Nicky Chinn, Mike Chapman		1974	
"We Can Make It Together"	Alan Merrill, Jake Hooker	2:57	Mickie Most	First Hit (CD)	1974	B-side of "Touch Too Much"
"What's Come Between Us"	Alan Merrill, Jake Hooker	3:33	Phil Coulter	First Hit (LP)	1976	
"Who Done It?"	Alan Merrill	3:07	unknown	Tawny Tracks	2002	

==== Cover versions ====
Song	Writer(s)	Original artist	Album	Year	Other
Boogiest Band in Town	Bill Martin, Phil Coulter	Slik	Slik (CD)	1975	
Dreamin'	Johnny Burnette	Johnny Burnette	Dreamin'	1960	
Thanks	Bill Martin, Phil Coulter	J. Vincent Edwards	Thanks	1969	
Walk Away Renee	Michael Brown, Bob Calilli, Tony Sansone	The Left Banke	Walk Away Renée/Pretty Ballerina	1966	

==== Arrow songs covered by others ====
Song	Writer(s)	First artist	Name	Album	Year	Other
I Love Rock 'n' Roll	Alan Merrill, Jake Hooker	Joan Jett & the Blackhearts	I Love Rock 'n' Roll	I Love Rock 'n Roll	1981	
Love Child	Craig McLearie, John Laurenson	Craig McLearie	Love Child	Warp Factor	1979	
Touch Too Much	Nicky Chinn, Mike Chapman	Roman Holliday; Hello	Touch Too Much	Fire Me Up; Glam Rockers	1984; 1996	
