= Set the Tone (band) =

Scottish electronic dance group (1982–1983)

- Origin: Glasgow, Scotland
- Genres: Synth-pop; electronic
- Years active: 1982–1983
- Label: Island
- Past members: Kenny Hyslop; Bobby Paterson; Chris Morgan; Evelyn Asiedu

Set the Tone were a Scottish electronic music group, formed by Kenny Hyslop, Bobby Paterson, Chris Morgan and Evelyn Asiedu.

== Background ==
Hyslop had been a former member of a number of Scottish bands including the Zones, the Skids and Slik. In 1981, he joined Simple Minds but his time with them was brief, although he played drums on their hit single "Promised You a Miracle", which reached number 13 on the UK Singles Chart in April 1982. Following his departure from Simple Minds, Hyslop got together with Paterson, Morgan and Asiedu to form Set the Tone.

Set the Tone quickly managed to secure a recording contract with Island Records late in 1982, and their first single "Dance Sucker" (b/w "Dance Sucker" remixed by Francois Kevorkian) was released. Despite getting significant play in the clubs of Glasgow, the single did not make a strong impression on the UK Singles Chart, peaking at number 62 in January 1983.

Their second single, "Rap Your Love" (b/w "Surprise Your Love") was released in 1983, peaking at number 67 on the UK chart in March 1983. Around this time, their album Shiftin Air Affair was released, but had little impact.

Meanwhile, Paterson left and was replaced by Kendal Stubbs, a sound engineer from The Bahamas who had previously worked with Kool and the Gang and Tom Tom Club. Shortly afterwards, Island Records dropped Set the Tone.

Following the demise of Set the Tone, Hyslop formed the One O'Clock Gang who released an album on Arista Records, again without significant commercial success. He went on to be credited on a number of singles and albums, including some by Midge Ure. However, after becoming disillusioned with the music industry, Hyslop became an alternative DJ. This was until leaving the UK for Canada with blues band Big George and the Business. After returning to the UK, Hyslop started teaching drumming at Carlton Studios in Glasgow, as well as producing new music published through Myspace.

The band was briefly featured in the unreleased horror film Grizzly II: The Predator in a few scenes of the rock concert.

Paterson became part of the bands Primal Scream, Love and Money and, later the Poems with Adrian Barry and Bobby Bluebell. He died in 2006. Morgan released "Deep Fat" with Derek Brown and Stuart Lowndes in New York, and is currently a San Francisco, California resident. Asiedu works for Universal Music in New York.

== Discography ==
=== Albums ===
- Shiftin Air Affair (1983)

=== Singles ===
Month	Year	Title	UK Singles Chart	Album
January	1982	"Dance Sucker"	62	-
March	1983	"Rap Your Love"	67	Shiftin Air Affair
