= Stick with You =

Stick with You may refer to:

- "Stick with You", a song by Tomorrow X Together from 7th Year: A Moment of Stillness in the Thorns, 2026
- "Stick with You", a song by Zara Larsson from Poster Girl, 2021
- "Stick wit U", a song by Girls' Generation from Oh!, 2010
- "Stickwitu", a song by Pussycat Dolls, 2005

== See also ==
- "Stuck with You", a song by Huey Lewis and the News, 1986
- "Stuck with You" (Zones song), 1978
- "Stuck with U", a song by Ariana Grande and Justin Bieber, 2020
