= Broken Down Heart =

British rock song

"Broken Down Heart" was a song with the dubious distinction of first being on the A-side, and then subsequently flipped to the B-side of a 45 rpm record by the band Arrows in 1975. On the other side of this vinyl single record was the first released version of a song that has gone on to become an internationally known rock standard, "I Love Rock 'N Roll."

A medium tempo song, "Broken Down Heart" was written by Roger Ferris, produced by Mickie Most on RAK Records, and sung by Arrows lead vocalist Alan Merrill. The record was a follow-up to a top 30 UK chart hit by Arrows "My Last Night With You", also written by Ferris. John Bundrick played piano on "Broken Down Heart," Chris Spedding played the guitar, and drums were by Clem Cattini. The only Arrows band member actually contributing on "Broken Down Heart" was lead singer Merrill, who also played bass on the track.
