= Tracie Young =

English singer (born 1965)

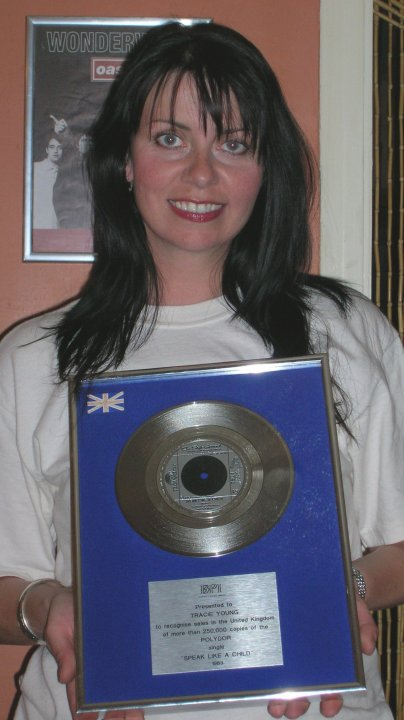
- Young with her BPI silver disc for "Speak Like a Child" which she auctioned to raise money for Little Havens Children's Hospice in 2007.

Background information
- Born: Tracie Young; 25 March 1965 (age 61); Derby, England
- Genres: Pop
- Occupations: Singer; radio presenter
- Instrument: Vocals
- Years active: 1982–present
- Labels: Respond; Polydor; Cherry Red

Tracie Young (often just billed as Tracie; born 25 March 1965) is a former English pop singer in the 1980s. She achieved success after becoming a protégée of Paul Weller.

== Career ==
Born in Derby, England, Young was discovered by The Jam frontman, Paul Weller, through an advertisement in Smash Hits magazine for his Respond Records label. The ad solicited demo tapes from female singers between the ages of 18 and 24, for the purpose of hiring a vocalist alongside the group The Questions. Although just 17 years old, Young replied and sent Weller a cassette of a Phoebe Snow-inspired version of the Betty Wright hit "Shoorah Shoorah". Young's tape was singled out from among the hundreds received, and shortly thereafter she was invited to London for an audition. Performing old soul numbers "Band of Gold" and "Reach Out (I'll Be There)" for the audition, Young impressed Weller enough to win the job and become his priority signing for the Respond label.

Before recording solo work for Respond, Weller sought to increase exposure for Young. He promptly used her for backing vocals on The Jam's final single, "Beat Surrender", which was released on 26 November 1982 and became the band's fourth No. 1 single. Weller also had Young join the group for their appearance on Top of the Pops to promote the song.

In January 1983, Young contributed vocals for The Style Council's first single, "Speak Like a Child", and also appeared in the promotional video for the song. As an unofficial member of the group, Young toured with The Style Council for part of 1983, while also performing as a solo artist as part of a Respond package tour.

Young was featured on the cover of the 9 April 1983 issue of New Musical Express with the banner "Tracie: The girl star Paul Weller would build". She was also voted "Most Fanciable Female" in Smash Hits 1983 readers' poll.

Signed to Respond, she had UK hit singles in March 1983 with "The House That Jack Built" and, in July, with "Give it Some Emotion" (both credited simply to 'Tracie')

Her debut album, Far from the Hurting Kind, was released in 1984 under the name Tracie. It was reissued in Japan in 1996. Weller produced and backed the record and wrote some of the songs. A featured track was the Elvis Costello song "(I Love You) When You Sleep", which he wrote for her.

Young recorded with The Style Council again in 1985, contributing backing vocals to the song "Boy Who Cried Wolf", a single taken from the album Our Favourite Shop.

Respond ceased operations in 1986 and Young was briefly signed by Polydor. The second album she recorded whilst signed to Polydor, titled No Smoke Without Fire, was never released by them. It was eventually released in May 2014 by Cherry Red Records.

In the late 1990s Young enjoyed a second career as a radio presenter, working at Radio Essex and Connect FM in Peterborough and Northamptonshire.

On 6 June 2009, Young did a one-off gig, supporting Billy Franks (formerly of The Faith Brothers) at the Shepherd's Bush Empire. Young was backed by the Southend rock band, Soliss. In the wake of the show, Young released a self-produced, limited edition six-song EP of previously released material, titled It Happened One Night... And Other Songs.

In 2010, with the co-operation of Young, Cherry Red Records reissued her 1984 debut Far from the Hurting Kind, marking the first time the album has been available in the UK on CD. The 20-track CD features the 10 songs from the original album release plus 10 bonus tracks.

== Discography ==
=== Albums ===
- Far from the Hurting Kind (June 1984) - UK No. 64
- No Smoke Without Fire (May 2014, recorded during 1985-1986)
- Souls On Fire: The Recordings 1983-1986 (2023)

=== EPs ===
- It Happened One Night... And Other Songs (June 2009)

=== Singles ===
- "The House That Jack Built" (April 1983) - UK No. 9
- "Give It Some Emotion" (July 1983) - UK No. 24
- "Souls on Fire" (March 1984) - UK No. 73
- "(I Love You) When You Sleep" (May 1984) - UK No. 59
- "I Can't Leave You Alone" (July 1985) - UK No. 60
- "Invitation" (October 1985)
- "We Should Be Together" (July 1986)
- "(When You) Call Me" (October 1986)

=== As backing vocalist ===
- "Beat Surrender" (with the Jam, November 1982) - UK No. 1
- "Speak Like a Child" (with the Style Council, March 1983) - UK No. 4
- "Boy Who Cried Wolf" (with the Style Council, 1985) - NZ No. 21
