= Back Home (song) =

Single by England World Cup Squad
- B-side: "Cinnamon Stick"
- Released: April 1970
- Length: 2:07
- Label: Pye
- Songwriter(s): Bill Martin, Phil Coulter
- Producer(s): Bill Martin, Phil Coulter

England World Cup Squad singles chronology
"Back Home" (1970)	"This Time (We'll Get It Right)" / "England, We'll Fly the Flag" (1982)

"Back Home" is a popular song written by Bill Martin and Phil Coulter. It was recorded by the 1970 England World Cup squad and released on the single Pye 7N 17920. It was produced by Martin and Coulter. The musical arrangements were made by Coulter. The single, which began the tradition of the England squad recording songs to celebrate its involvement in the World Cup, reached number one on the UK Singles Chart for three weeks in May 1970. England were the reigning world champions at the time, having won the 1966 World Cup, but were knocked out in the quarter finals after a 3-2 defeat by West Germany.

The song was also a hit in Ireland, reaching number two in the charts there.

The England team failed to qualify for the next two World Cups and, although it did release records on qualification in 1982 and 1986, it did not reach number one again until 1990, when it topped the charts with the New Order collaboration "World in Motion". The song is one of four singles supporting the England team to have topped the UK chart, along with the aforementioned "World in Motion", "Three Lions" and "Shout for England".

The tune to the song was also used as the theme tune for popular BBC mid-1990s football/comedy TV programme Fantasy Football League.

The B side of the 7" vinyl single was called "Cinnamon Stick", and was also sung by the England football team. It began, "Sweet as sugar, twice as nice, cinnamon stick, cinnamon stick; see that twinkle in her eyes, cinnamon stick, cinnamon stick." After this, the tempo increases as the song goes into declarations of love. The b-side gained infamy during the 1998 World Cup, when Skinner and Baddiel mentioned it on their television show “Fantasy World Cup”, a spin-off of “Fantasy Football League”. Jeff Astle in his usual closing segment to the show, sung the song at the end of a later episode.

== Charts ==
Chart (1970)	Peak position
Ireland (IRMA)	2
UK Singles (OCC)	1
