= Arrows (TV series) =

British television pop music series (1976–1977)

- Genre: Music
- Starring: Arrows
- Country of origin: United Kingdom
- Original language: English
- No. of seasons: 4
- No. of episodes: 28

Production
- Producer: ITV / Granada

Original release
- Network: ITV
- Release: 1976 – 1977

Arrows is a British television pop series aimed at the teen market, which aired in 1976 and 1977.

The show was produced by Muriel Young, and ran for two fourteen-week series on the ITV network, produced by Granada Television.

The show format was that the band Arrows would perform their own songs, and would introduce the guest artists. There was also a pop dance troupe called Him and Us who were regulars on the series. Arrows consisted of (lead singer) Alan Merrill, (guitarist) Jake Hooker and (drummer) Paul Varley.

Guests on Arrows included such artists as Marc Bolan, the Bay City Rollers, the Drifters, Gilbert O'Sullivan, Peter Noone, Alvin Stardust, Gene Pitney, Slade, Pilot, Billy J. Kramer, the Real Thing, and many more.

Arrows were very popular in the teen print media in the mid-1970s, appearing in interviews and as pin-ups in all the glossy fan magazines of the day. They even had their own weekly cartoon strip which ran in Music Star magazine. A book was written about the band by Bill Harry in 1976.

== The band ==
Historically, Arrows are now best known for writing, recording, and releasing the first version of the song "I Love Rock 'N Roll" in 1975, a year before the band had their television series. The song served the band well. Arrows' performance of the song so impressed television producer, Muriel Young, when they did her show 45 in 1975, she decided to give the band their own weekly television series on that day. The song was later recorded by artists like Joan Jett and Britney Spears.

== Synopsis ==
Arrows are the only band in pop music history to have a weekly television series of their own and no records released. Although they had hit singles before their series, the band released no recordings during the entire run of the shows. This unusual situation was due to a legal wrangle with their record label. Their last single release was two months before the first broadcast of Arrows.

There were twenty-eight episodes in total. With repeats, that is fifty-six airings of the show.

Arrows was broadcast across the entire ITV network for both series.

During the second series the band added a fourth member, guitarist Terry Taylor, formerly a member of the band Tucky Buzzard. Taylor was introduced to Arrows by The Rolling Stones' bass player Bill Wyman in January 1976. Terry Taylor is currently the musical director and a guitarist in Bill Wyman's Rhythm Kings band.

== Aftermath ==
As a result of their business complications, Arrows broke up in frustration in 1978, with the original Arrows Alan Merrill, Jake Hooker and Paul Varley all going their separate ways. In 1978, Merrill went on to the Island Records band Runner, Varley to the Charisma Records band Darling, and Hooker married Lorna Luft, retiring as a performer and becoming his wife's manager.

The Arrows show producer, Muriel Young, died in 2001.
