= Runner (band) =

British rock band

- Origin: London, England
- Genre: Rock
- Years active: 1978–1980
- Label: Island
- Past members: Alan Merrill; Steve Gould; Mick Feat; Dave Dowle

Runner were a short-lived British rock band, formed in 1978 out of a friendship between Steve Gould of the band Rare Bird and Alan Merrill of the band Arrows.

Steve Gould had been touring with Merrill's live band Arrows after his band Rare Bird broke up in 1976. When the Arrows broke up in 1978 both singers were looking for new projects. They went into the studio to do a rough demo with bass player Mick Feat, who was playing with Van Morrison at the time, and drummer Dave Dowle who was playing with the band Whitesnake.

After a demo from the band they were signed by Acrobat Records in the UK and Island Records in the USA immediately. They went to The Manor recording studio in Oxfordshire England and recorded their first and only album with James Guthrie producing.

The Runner album charted in the US, spending four weeks on the Billboard 200 and peaking at #167, but due to musical differences the band broke up whilst recording their second album with Alex Sadkin producing.

After the band split, Mick Feat and Steve Gould went on to record with Alvin Lee, Dave Dowle with the Maggie Bell band Nightflyer, and Alan Merrill joined Rick Derringer's band Derringer.

The band Runner never toured, in spite of their making the American charts.

== Discography ==
- Runner (Acrobat/Island, 1979)
  1. "Fooling Myself" (2:58)
  2. "Run for Your Life" (4:10)
  3. "Broken Hearted Me" (3:42)
  4. "Truly from Within" (3:21)
  5. "Dynamite" (4:22)
  6. "Sooner Than Later" (3:23)
  7. "Rock & Roll Soldiers" (3:29)
  8. "Gone Too Long" (5:42)
  9. "Living Is Loving You" (3:01)
  10. "Restless Wind" (4:11)
