= Alan Merrill =

American vocalist, guitarist and songwriter (1951–2020)

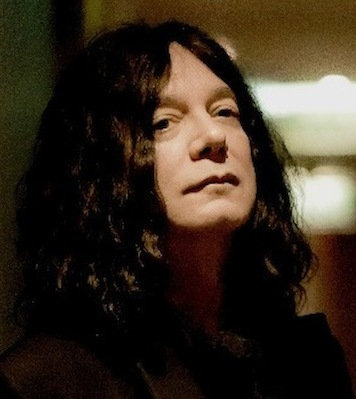
- Merrill in 2013

Background information
- Born: Allan Preston Sachs; February 19, 1951; New York City, U.S.
- Died: March 29, 2020 (aged 69) New York City, U.S.
- Genres: Glam rock, pop, rock
- Occupations: Musician, songwriter, singer
- Instruments: Vocals, guitar, bass guitar, keyboards, harmonica
- Years active: 1968–2020
- Labels: RCA, RAK, Atlantic, Polydor, Toshiba-EMI, Denon/Columbia
- Formerly of: Arrows, The Lead, Vodka Collins, Runner
- Website: Official website

Alan Merrill (born Allan Preston Sachs; February 19, 1951 – March 29, 2020) was an American vocalist, guitarist and songwriter. In the early 1970s, he was one of the few resident foreigners in Japan to achieve pop star status there. He wrote the song "I Love Rock 'n' Roll", and was the lead singer on the original recording of it, made by the band the Arrows in 1975. The song became a breakthrough hit for Joan Jett in 1982.

Merrill was primarily a vocalist and songwriter, but also played the guitar, bass guitar, harmonica, and keyboards. He died during the COVID-19 pandemic due to complications brought on by the virus.

== Early life ==
Merrill was born in The Bronx, New York City on February 19, 1951, the son of two jazz musicians, singer Helen Merrill and saxophone/clarinet player Aaron Sachs. He attended Aiglon College in Switzerland from age 9 to 13, schools in New York and Los Angeles and, briefly, Sophia University in Tokyo. He started his semi-professional career in New York City at age 14, when he began playing in Greenwich Village's Cafe Wha? with the bands The Kaleidoscope, The Rayne, and Watertower West, all of which played the club from 1966–1968.

== Professional career ==
=== Japan ===
In 1969, Merrill auditioned for the New York City band, the Left Banke. According to Merrill, the audition was successful, but the band dissolved. Shortly thereafter, he left to reside in Japan, where his mother was living, and began his professional career there by joining the band The Lead, who were contracted to RCA Victor Records. The group was a foreign Tokyo-based act, and had an urgent requirement for a fill-in musician after one of its American members was deported. The Lead had previously had some chart success, but the project soon fell apart when a second member was also deported.

Merrill subsequently signed a solo management deal with Watanabe Productions, who contracted him to Atlantic Records, and changed his professional surname from Sachs to Merrill (his mother's stage name) apparently because "Merrill" was thought to sound less lascivious and more commercially viable when spoken by young Japanese pop music fans. He recorded one album with Atlantic, Alone in Tokyo (February 1971) which yielded a single, "Namida" (Teardrops).

In other activities, Merrill acted on the TV soap opera Jikan Desu Yo and occasionally had his own 'corner' on the TBS's Young 720, a morning show for teens. He was a model in ads for Nissan cars, Jun clothing, AnnAnn, Non-no, and GT Jeans.

In January 1972, an LP of his own compositions titled Merrill 1 was released on the Denon/Columbia record label produced by Mickey Curtis. Later that year, the singer Tiny Tim covered a song from the album, "Movies", on Scepter Records. Merrill then formed the band Vodka Collins, which became a prominent glam rock act. The band included notable Japanese musicians Hiroshi "Monsieur" Kamayatsu and Hiroshi Oguchi. Vodka Collins recorded an LP in 1973, Tokyo – New York, on the Toshiba-EMI Express label The band are best known for recording and releasing the first popular glam rock songs in Japanese, including the double A-sided single "Sands Of Time" and "Automatic Pilot", released June 1973.

A dispute with management led to Merrill's abrupt departure from Japan.

=== UK ===
In 1974, in London, Merrill formed the band Arrows (as lead singer and bass guitarist), with drummer Paul Varley and guitarist Jake Hooker. Peter Meaden was the Arrows' first manager, but later they signed with Mickie Most's RAK Records. In March 1974, the Arrows were in the top 10 in the UK charts with the song "Touch Too Much". The Arrows became a popular band with teenagers, and once again Merrill had slid back into the teenage market he had fought hard to get out of in Japan.

The Arrows had another hit single with "My Last Night With You" which reached the UK top 30 in 1975, but the band's single releases were few. Recorded at Morgan studio in London 1974 Merrill played bass guitar on drummer Cozy Powell's chart hit single "The Man In Black" and the B-side "After Dark" produced by Mickie Most on RAK records. The recording hit a peak position of No. 18 on the British charts.

With the Arrows, Merrill sang three chart hit records as the band's lead singer, all produced by Mickie Most, "Touch Too Much" (No. 8 UK charts) "Toughen Up" (No. 51 UK charts) and "My Last Night With You" (No. 25 UK charts). They made one more single that would be an important one. "I Love Rock 'n' Roll" (1975) that started out as a B-side to the 45 rpm Arrows single "Broken Down Heart". The song "I Love Rock 'N Roll" was composed by Alan Merrill whilst he was living in Nell Gwynn House in Chelsea. A credit as co-writer went to Arrows bandmate Jake Hooker, to whom Merrill owed some money.

The recording was later flipped to A-side status, and the band made only one television performance with the song. The show's producer Muriel Young was so impressed with the Arrows that she made a pitch to Granada ITV for them to have their own television series. The Arrows then got their own weekly TV series Arrows in 1976, taking over from the Bay City Rollers Granada TV series Shang-a-Lang. The Arrows signed with MAM Management. Their producer Mickie Most was so angry at the band for signing the management deal, that he vowed to never release another Arrows record. So it came to pass that Arrows had their own weekly television series and no records released during that time. Their ratings were so good that they got a second weekly series, but they released no new recordings. The Arrows disbanded shortly after the end of the second series.

In 1977, Merrill formed a new group, the album-oriented rock act Runner, with Steve Gould (Rare Bird), Mick Feat (Van Morrison band), and Dave Dowle (Whitesnake). The Runner album charted in the Billboard top 100 in the United States.

Relationships

In 1977 Merrill met and married fashion model Cathee Dahmen in London, and had their wedding reception at Mr Chow's in Knightsbridge. They subsequently had two children, Laura Ann Sachs and Allan Preston Sachs Jr. In 1980 they relocated to Queens, New York together with Cathee's daughter Sarah Beth Whiting from her previous marriage to Leonard Whiting. Their marriage ended in divorce, and in 1987 Merrill went on to marry Joanna (née Lisanti), with whom he had a second daughter, Allegra Sachs.

=== Later ===
In 1980, Merrill joined forces with Rick Derringer as a guitarist/vocalist in New York City. They recorded three albums, Good Dirty Fun, Live at The Ritz, Rick Derringer and Friends, and a film, The Rick Derringer Rock Spectacular. Merrill wrote three songs on the Derringer Good Dirty Fun album, "White Heat" (Alan Merrill), "Shake Me" (Alan Merrill/Jake Hooker) and "Lesson Learned" (Alan Merrill/Rick Derringer). "Shake Me" was included in the soundtrack of the film Where the Boys Are '84 (1984).

In 1982, Joan Jett released a cover of "I Love Rock 'N Roll", which was No. 1 on the U.S. Billboard charts for seven weeks and helped launch her career. The following year Lou Rawls recorded Alan Merrill's song "When The Night Comes" as the title track of his 1983 Epic Records album. The Rawls' version of the song was taken into space by astronaut Guion Bluford, the first music taken to and played in outer space.

In 1983, Merrill recorded a solo album for Polydor Records, simply titled Alan Merrill, a collection of self-composed tracks. Some friends contributing to this record were Steve Winwood, Mick Taylor and Dallas Taylor. It was released in 1985 and received critical acclaim. In 1986, Merrill joined the Meat Loaf band for the promotional tour of his Blind Before I Stop album, and stayed for several years, and appears on Meat Loaf's 1987 Live at Wembley (1987) album for Arista Records. In 1989, Merrill was offered a role on the television series Encyclopedia Brown on HBO, and was a part of the successful series in his role as principal character Casey Sparkz. Merrill wrote a song for the production, "Who Done It?" which he performed on the series and was featured in the concert scene.

In 1990, a Vodka Collins reunion tour was organized due to popular demand as a result of the successful CD reissue of their vinyl LP Tokyo – New York. The Tokyo-based band toured Japan, then several years later recorded the first in a series of reunion albums, Chemical Reaction (1996) which was followed by Pink Soup (1997), Boy's Life (1998) and Boys in The Band (2004). The Vodka Collins Tokyo – New York album has been reissued again as recently as October 2011 on EMI Japan.

While working in Japan with his main project Vodka Collins, Merrill also had a side project in New York, starting with a tribute to Don Covay he began recording with R&B producer Jon Tiven. This led to the "Yes I Ram" and "Blue Guru" albums in the mid-1990s featuring Merrill on lead vocals.

Merrill released the solo albums Never Pet A Burning Dog (1998), Cupid Deranged (2002), A Merrilly Christmas (2001), Double Shot Rocks (2003) - a tribute to songwriters Otis Blackwell and Arthur Alexander, Aleecat (2004), At The Candy Shop (2006), and Rive Gauche (2007) - a tribute to The Left Banke. The reissue Alien in Tokyo, EP single Hard Road, and an in concert album The Aleecat, Live In Japan were all released in 2008. Albums by Merrill titled The Face Of 69 (2010), Numbers (2011), Snakes and Ladders (2012), Songer Singwriter (2013), Arrows, 40th Anniversary Edition (2014), Demo Graphic (2016) On A Blue Avenue (2017) and Radio Zero (2019 ) were also released.

The Arrows 1974 top 10 UK hit "Touch Too Much", featuring lead vocals by Merrill appears on the soundtrack of the feature film The Look Of Love, a 2013 biopic of Paul Raymond. "Restless Soul", a song Merrill co-wrote with Shinohara Nobuhiko that was on air nightly on the Asahi TV travel show Sekai No Kaido Wo Yuku (Traveling on the roads of the world) in Japan broadcast from 2014 to 2015. The Arrows' songs "We Can Make It Together" and "Moving Next Door To You" (composed by Merrill and Jake Hooker) were used on the BBC1 TV show Homes Under The Hammer series 18 episode 70 and series 19 episode 53 respectively in England, first aired on February 5, 2015. The songs were B-sides of the Arrows RAK records top 30 hit singles "Touch Too Much" and "My Last Night With You" produced by Mickie Most in 1974 and 1975 with lead vocals by Merrill. In September 2015, Merrill added his guitar parts to popular Japanese vocalist Superfly's cover of his composition, "I Love Rock N Roll", released three months later on Warner Brothers-Japan records.

In early June 2016, he released a duet with fellow 1970s UK rock star Bob Bradbury of the band Hello titled "Brothers in Rock" and another duet, this one in Japanese with Bruce Bauer, "Hello Japan", out June 20, 2016. On November 28, 2017, he released a 15-song solo album, On A Blue Avenue. He also did live concerts internationally, both with backing bands and solo acoustic. A film featuring Alan Merrill as a principal actor was released July 1, 2017, titled Re-Agitator / Revenge Of The Parody. On December 15, 2017, Eminem released his album Revival including the title "Remind Me" crediting Allan Sachs (professionally known as Alan Merrill) as one of the song's co-writers for use of "I Love Rock N Roll" samples. The Eminem album made its debut at #1 in the Billboard album charts.

He hosted the television series Across the Pond for the MyJam Music Network. He also wrote and recorded the show's theme song "Across the Pond" which was released March 2018.

In mid-February 2019, Merrill released a Valentine's Day song he wrote titled "Your Love Song."

== Death ==
Merrill died of complications due to COVID-19 in Manhattan on March 29, 2020, aged 69. He was survived by his second wife, his three children and his mother.
