= Roger Ferris =

British musician

Roger Anthony Ferris is a British pop music composer, active throughout the 1970s and 1980s. He is father of pianist, arranger, and producer and Steinway & Sons global ambassador Dominic Ferris.

== Composition work ==
In 1975, Ferris wrote the Top 30 UK chart hit single "My Last Night With You" for The Arrows. The song was produced by Mickie Most on his RAK label, and as recorded by The Arrows was also a top 30 chart hit in Switzerland. Ferris wrote two more songs for The Arrows, both released in 1975 in the UK and Europe: "Hard Hearted" and "Broken Down Heart", both released in 1975. "Broken Down Heart" was the B-side of the first version of "I Love Rock 'n' Roll" (made famous in the US by Joan Jett & the Blackhearts in 1981).

In 1979, Ferris went on to co-write with Glo Macari a further two international hits for RAK. These were "Boy Oh Boy", recorded by Racey and also produced by Mickie Most, and "Babe It's Up To You", recorded by Smokie. Both songs charted in various European territories.

Prior to his association with RAK, Ferris was the lyricist for the theme song of the 1970s comedy film, On the Buses.

== Sound engineering work ==
Ferris was a sound engineer on recordings by The Beatles at Abbey Road Studios in the late 1960s. He assisted on the following tracks on Let It Be (1970):

- "Two Of Us"
- "Dig It"
- "Maggie Mae"
- "For You Blue"
- "The Long And Winding Road"
- "Across The Universe"

== 1990s–2010s ==
Since the 1990s, Ferris has been the bass player and co-writer for the British blues trio Smokestack. The band were invited to guest for a live session on the Paul Jones blues programme on BBC Radio 2 in 1999.

He has a musical duo with songwriter and musician Glo Macari. Glo Macari is part of the Macari family, who run the musical instrument store Macari's on Denmark Street, London.

== Family ==
Roger Ferris's son is the British pianist, music producer and arranger Dominic Ferris. Dominic graduated from the Royal College of Music. He is a global ambassador for Steinway & Sons pianos, and currently tours the world with various musical acts.

Dominic arranged and recorded piano at Abbey Road Studios for the UK number one album by Elvis Presley: If I Can Dream. Dominic joined the Royal Philharmonic Concert Orchestra as Assistant Musical Director and pianist for the accompanying UK arena tour and the Memphis Symphony Orchestra for the US anniversary tour. The arena tour finished with a performance at Graceland with Priscilla Presley for the Elvis 40th Anniversary Celebrations.
