= Touch Too Much (Arrows song) =

Single by Arrows
- B-side: "We Can Make It Together"
- Released: 1974
- Genre: glam rock
- Label: RAK Records
- Songwriters: Mike Chapman and Nicky Chinn
- Producer: Mickie Most

Arrows singles chronology
"Touch Too Much" (1974)	"Toughen Up" (1974)

Official audio
- "Touch Too Much" on YouTube

"Touch Too Much" is the debut single by the British band Arrows sung by lead vocalist Alan Merrill, and composed by Mike Chapman and Nicky Chinn. It was a top 10 hit on the UK Singles Chart, peaking at No. 8 in June 1974. Merrill told Songfacts that the song was turned down by David Cassidy, Suzi Quatro and Sweet.

The recording was produced by Mickie Most and was released on RAK Records, distributed by EMI.

"Touch Too Much" was Arrows' highest charting hit; it also reached No. 2 in the South African charts and was in the top 20 there for 15 weeks. The song appeared on the soundtrack of the feature film The Look of Love, a 2013 biopic of Paul Raymond.

The song was later covered by the bands Roman Holliday in 1984, and Hello in the 1990s.
