= Zoom Records (Scotland) =

- Founded: 11 July 1977
- Founder: Bruce Findlay
- Defunct: 1980
- Genre: Punk rock, new wave
- Country of origin: Scotland
- Location: Edinburgh

Zoom Records was a short-lived record label established in Edinburgh, Scotland. It was founded and funded by the successful music shop owner Bruce Findlay in mid 1977. After the first four single releases it secured a licensing deal with Arista Records. Findlay closed the label in 1980, to dedicate his time to managing one of the most successful bands who began there, Simple Minds.

== History ==
Findlay was well known in the British music industry. He became the buyer for McDougall's record shop in Falkirk, run by his mother, then at stores in Edinburgh, London and Stirling. Findlay helped his brother found Brian's in Falkirk in 1967, then they expanded to open Bruce's in 1969, in Edinburgh's Rose Street. Bruce's Record Shops opened a store in Glasgow the following year, then Kirkcaldy, eventually becoming the largest independent record chain in Scotland, with thirteen stores. Findlay organised the first Edinburgh Pop Festival in 1973, which featured among others the Incredible String Band, Can, Planxty, the Chieftains, John Martyn, Kevin Ayers, George Melly and Procol Harum. Guinness became majority shareholders of Bruce's in the late 1970s and Findlay ceased involvement in 1980. The chain ceased trading in 1981, the Falkirk and Kirkcaldy branches continuing as Sleeves, under a management buyout.

Zoom signed many Scottish punk and new wave bands, some of them, later well known and successful, such as Simple Minds, who Findlay managed from 1978 to 1990. One of the first bands signed was the Valves, the second band were PVC2, who featured Midge Ure. The Skids almost joined the label, but Findlay encouraged them to go to Dunfermline record shop owner, Sandy Muir, out of which No Bad Records was formed.

The first single released by Zoom was "Robot Love" (with "For Adolfs Only" as B-side), by the Valves, on 30 August 1977, selling 15,000 copies.

Simple Minds signed shortly after their formation, releasing their debut album, Life in a Day and first two singles "Life in a Day" and "Chelsea Girl". Their first three albums (Life in a Day, Real to Real Cacophony and Empires and Dance) were released by Zoom and licensed to Arista Records.

Findlay now manages Aberfeldy, and has been regular host/contributor to Radio Forth and BBC Radio Scotland.

== Bands and releases ==
Ordered chronologically:

- "Robot Love" - The Valves (30 August 1977)
- "Put You in the Picture" - PVC2 (August 1977)
- "Ain't No Surf in Portobello" - The Valves (December 1977)
- "Stuck with You" - Zones (17 February 1978)
- "Radio-active" - The Cheetahs (1979)

All the below licensed to Arista Records

- "Some Other Guy" - The Questions (1978)
- "Love Is Blind" - Nightshift (1978)
- "Can't Get Over You" - The Questions (1979)
- Life in a Day - Simple Minds (10 March 1979)
- "Chelsea Girl" - Simple Minds (1 June 1979)

Albums:

- Life in a Day - Simple Minds
- Real to Real Cacophony - Simple Minds
- Empires and Dance - Simple Minds
