= Slik =

Scottish pop group (1974–1977)

Background information
- Also known as: PVC2 (1977)
- Origin: Glasgow, Scotland
- Genres: Pop rock; glam rock; pop; punk rock (early)
- Years active: 1974–1977
- Labels: Polydor, Bell, Arista, Epic, Zoom (PVC2)
- Past members: Jim McGinlay; Kevin McGinlay; Mario Tortolano; Nod Kerr; Ian Kenny; Brian Deniston; Matt Cairns; Robin Birrel; Kenny Hyslop; Billy McIsaac; Midge Ure; Russell Webb

Slik were a Scottish pop group of the mid-1970s, most notable for their UK number 1 hit "Forever and Ever" in 1976. Initially glam rock, the band later changed their style to soft rock/bubblegum. It was the first band with whom singer and guitarist Midge Ure began to experience musical success, before joining new wave band Ultravox.

== History ==
Slik were formed as the Glasgow based band 'Salvation' in June 1970, comprising brothers Kevin McGinlay (vocals) and Jim McGinlay (bass), Nod Kerr (drums), Mario Tortolano (keyboards), and Ian Kenny (guitar). Brian Deniston replaced Ian Kenny in December 1970 and Nod Kerr departed in May 1971, followed by Tortolano and they were replaced by Matt Cairns on drums and Robin Birrel on keyboards. Deniston left shortly after this change and they were forced to continue as a four-piece outfit for almost a year, with Kevin McGinlay taking up guitar duties. Birrel and Cairns then left in March 1972 and they recruited Kenny Hyslop on drums, Billy McIsaac on keyboards and Jim "Midge" Ure on guitar. They reverted to a four-piece band when Kevin McGinlay left in April 1974 to pursue a solo career, with Midge Ure becoming the band's lead vocalist.

They changed their name to Slik in November 1974, and linked up with the pop songwriters Bill Martin and Phil Coulter, who were also writing for the Bay City Rollers. Now signed to Polydor, the band members all adopted pseudonyms - Midge, Oil Slik (Kenny Hyslop), Jim Slik (Jim McGinlay) and Lord Slik (Billy McIsaac). These were dropped after the failure of "Boogiest Band in Town", their debut single (which was also on the soundtrack of the film Never Too Young To Rock), and their suits were exchanged for baseball shirts. A change of record label also saw them signing with Bell Records.

This was followed by their greatest success when their single "Forever And Ever" reached number one in the UK Singles Chart in February 1976. As a result of the single, readers of The Sun newspaper voted Slik the best new band of the year. The song formula was repeated with their next single, "Requiem", which made the UK top 30 but failed to repeat the success of "Forever and Ever". Ure was injured in a car accident shortly after the release of the single, resulting in the cancellation of television appearances and a planned UK tour. "Requiem" opens with the first chords of Joaquín Rodrigo's "Concierto de Aranjuez", which had been a number 3 hit just two months before in the UK for Geoff Love's orchestra, billed as 'Manuel & the Music of the Mountains'. Following the "Requiem" single, the band's self-titled album was released but this was a commercial failure, peaking only at number 58 in the UK. Subsequent Slik singles failed to chart.

In March 1977, Jim McGinlay left the group and was replaced by Russell Webb, a university drop-out, who continued for the final Slik gigs.

== PVC2 ==
Shortly after Webb joined and a last tour, the band decided to change both genre and name. They chose to call themselves PVC2, and played punk music which was growing in popularity at that time. In the latter half of 1977, PVC2 released "Put You in the Picture", on Zoom Records, a song which joined the repertoire of the Rich Kids, Ure's next band. Slik/PVC2 disbanded in September 1977.

Following Ure's departure, Webb, Hyslop and McIsaac added Alex Harvey's cousin Willie Gardner to their next band, called Zones; they released some singles and an album, Under Influence (1979) (which credited Midge Ure among the collaborators), but went their separate ways shortly afterwards. Webb and Hyslop joined the Skids, and McIsaac retired from the pop music scene. In the 1990s, he formed the Billy McIsaac Band.

== Band members (Salvation / Slik / PVC2 / Zones) ==
- Kevin McGinlay — lead vocals (June 1970-April 1974), guitars (mid 1971-March 1972)
- Ian Kenny — guitars (June–December 1970)
- Mario Tortolano — keyboards (June 1970-May 1971)
- Jim McGinlay — bass, backing vocals (June 1970-March 1977)
- Nod Kerr — drums (June 1970-May 1971)
- Brian Deniston — guitars (December 1970-mid 1971)
- Robin Birrel — keyboards (May 1971-March 1972)
- Matt Cairns — drums (May 1971-March 1972)
- Midge Ure — guitars (March 1972-September 1977), lead vocals (April 1974-September 1977)
- Billy McIsaac — keyboards, backing vocals (March 1972-late 1979)
- Kenny Hyslop — drums (March 1972-late 1979; died 2024)
- Russell Webb — bass, backing vocals (March-late 1979)
- Willie Gardner — guitars, lead vocals (late 1977-late 1979)

== Discography ==
=== Albums ===
- Slik (Bell, 1976) — UK number 58, AUS number 54
- The Best of Slik (Repertoire, 1999)
- Forever and Ever (Rotation, 2000) (Netherlands-only release)

=== Singles ===
Year	Single	Label	Peak chart positions								
Year	Single	Label	UK	AUS	BE (FLA)	BE (WA)	GER	IRE	NL	SA	ZIM
1974	"The Boogiest Band in Town" b/w "Hatchet"	Polydor	—	—	—	—	—	—	—	—	—
1975	"The Getaway" (Germany-only release) b/w "Again My Love"	Bellaphon	—	—	—	—	—	—	—	—	—
1975	"Forever and Ever" b/w "Again My Love"	Bell	1	54	3	35	6	2	3	7	2
1976	"Requiem" b/w "Everyday Anyway"	Bell	24	—	20	—	22	—	13	—	—
1976	"The Kid's a Punk" b/w "Silk Shuffle"	Bell	—	—	—	—	33	—	—	—	—
1976	"Bom-Bom" (Spain-only release) b/w "Dancerama"	Bell	—	—	—	—	—	—	—	—	—
1976	"Don't Take Your Love Away" b/w "This Side Up"	Arista	—	—	29	—	—	—	—	—	—
1977	"Bom-Bom" (Canada-only release) b/w "This Side Up"	Arista	—	—	—	—	—	—	—	—	—
1977	"Dancerama" (Germany-only release) b/w "I Wanna Be Loved"	EMI Electrola	—	—	—	—	30	—	—	—	—
1977	"It's Only a Matter of Time" (Germany-only release) b/w "I Wanna Be Loved"	EMI Electrola	—	—	—	—	—	—	—	—	—
1977	"Put You in the Picture" (EP; as PVC2) c/w "Pain"/"Deranged Demented & Free"	Zoom	—	—	—	—	—	—	—	—	—
"—" denotes releases that did not chart or were not released

=== List of songs ===
The following is a sortable table of all songs by Slik:

- The column Song list the song title.
- The column Writer(s) lists who wrote the song.
- The column Time shows the length of the title.
- The column Album lists the album the song is featured on.
- The column Producer lists the producer of the song.
- The column Year lists the year in which the song was released.

Song	Writer(s)	Time	Producer	Album	Year	Other
"Again My Love" (1975)	Jim McGinlay	3:13	Bill Martin-Phil Coulter	Slik (CD)	1975	B-side of "The Getaway"
"Again My Love" (1975)	Jim McGinlay	3:13	Bill Martin-Phil Coulter	Slik (CD)	1975	B-side of "Forever and Ever"
"Better Than I Do"	Bill Martin-Phil Coulter	4:50	Bill Martin-Phil Coulter	Slik (CD)	1976	
"Bom-Bom"	Exuma, Reno	3:20	Bill Martin-Phil Coulter	Slik (LP)	1976	A-side of "Dancerama", published in Spain and Canada
"Boogiest Band in Town"	Bill Martin-Phil Coulter	3:08	Bill Martin-Phil Coulter	Slik (CD)	1975	A-side of "Hatchet"
"Dancerama"	Bill Martin-Phil Coulter	5:44	Bill Martin-Phil Coulter	Slik (LP)	1977	A-side of "I Wanna Be Loved"
"Dancerama"	Bill Martin-Phil Coulter	5:44	Bill Martin-Phil Coulter	Slik (LP)	1976	B-side of "Bom-Bom"
"Darlin"	Billy McIsaac	4:06	Bill Martin-Phil Coulter	Slik (LP)	1976	
"Day By Day"	Billy McIsaac	2:52	Bill Martin-Phil Coulter	Slik (LP)	1976	
"Deranged Demented & Free" as PVC2	Kenny Hyslop	2:39			1977	
"Do It Again"	Midge Ure	2:54	Bill Martin-Phil Coulter	Slik (LP)	1976	
"Don't Take Your Love Away"	Bill Martin-Phil Coulter	4:01	Bill Martin-Phil Coulter	Slik (CD)	1976	A-side of "This Side Up"
"Everyday Anyway"	Kenny Hyslop	2:24	Bill Martin-Phil Coulter	Slik (CD)	1976	B-side of "Requiem"
"Forever and Ever"	Bill Martin-Phil Coulter	3:37	Bill Martin-Phil Coulter	Slik (LP)	1975	A-side of "Again My Love"
"Hatchet"	Bill Martin-Phil Coulter	2:21	Bill Martin-Phil Coulter	Slik (CD)	1975	B-side of "Boogiest Band in Town"
"I Wanna Be Loved"	Jim McGinlay	2:35	Bill Martin-Phil Coulter	Slik (CD)	1977	B-side of "Dancerama"
"It's Only a Matter of Time"	Herbie Flowers-Tony Kelly	2:53	Slik	Slik (CD)	1977	A-side of "No Star"
"No Star"	Billy McIsaac	3:35	Slik	Slik (CD)	1977	B-side of "It's Only a Matter of Time"
"No We Won't Forget You"	Jim McGinlay	5:17	Bill Martin-Phil Coulter	Slik (LP)	1976	
"Pain" as PVC2	Billy McIsaac	2:26			1977	
"Put You in the Picture" as PVC2	Midge Ure	3:04			1977	A-side of "Pain" and "Deranged Demented & Free"
"Requiem"	Bill Martin-Phil Coulter	4:54	Bill Martin-Phil Coulter	Slik (LP)	1976	A-side of "Everyday Anyway"
"Slik Shuffle"	James Ure	2:24	Bill Martin-Phil Coulter	Slik (CD)	1976	B-side of "The Kid's a Punk"
"The Getaway"	Robert Scott	3:11	Bill Martin-Phil Coulter	Slik (CD)	1975	A-side of "Again My Love"
"The Kid's a Punk"	Bill Martin-Phil Coulter	4:05	Bill Martin-Phil Coulter	Slik (CD)	1976	A-side of "Slik Shuffle"
"This Side Up"	Billy McIsaac	2:57	Bill Martin-Phil Coulter	Slik (CD)	1976	B-side of "Don't Take Your Love Away"
"When Will I Be Loved"	Phil Everly	4:01	Bill Martin-Phil Coulter	Slik (LP)	1976	

==== Cover versions ====
Song	Writer(s)	Original artist	Album	Year	Other
Bom-Bom	Exuma, Reno	Exuma		1974	
Forever and Ever	Bill Martin-Phil Coulter	Kenny	The Sound Of Super K	1975	
When Will I Be Loved	Phil Everly	The Everly Brothers	The Fabulous Style of The Everly Brothers	1960	

==== Slik songs covered by others ====
Song	Writer(s)	First artist	Name	Album	Year	Other
Boogiest Band in Town"	Bill Martin-Phil Coulter	Arrows	Boogiest Band In Town	First Hit (LP)	1976	
Dancerama	Bill Martin-Phil Coulter	Swinger Club	Dancerama	Welthits Als Jazz	2001	
Put You in the Picture as PVC2	Midge Ure	Rich Kids	Put You in the Picture	Ghosts of Princes in Towers	1978	
