= Far from the Hurting Kind =

Studio album by Tracie Young
- Released: 18 June 1984
- Genre: Pop
- Label: Respond
- Producer: Paul Weller; Brian Robson

Tracie Young chronology
Far from the Hurting Kind (1984)	No Smoke Without Fire (2014)

Far from the Hurting Kind is the debut album by the English pop singer Tracie Young. The album was originally released in the UK on 18 June 1984, and reached No. 64 on the UK Albums Chart. Far from the Hurting Kind was the second album released on Paul Weller's Respond record label. The album was produced by Weller and Brian Robson, and featured Weller on guitar under the pseudonym Jake Fluckery.

In 1996, the album was reissued on CD in Japan, with bonus tracks added. On 19 July 2010, Cherry Red Records released an expanded reissue of Far from the Hurting Kind, featuring the ten tracks from the original 1984 release plus ten bonus tracks, including Young's 1983 hit singles "The House That Jack Built" and "Give It Some Emotion".

== Track listing ==
1. "(I Love You) When You Sleep" (Elvis Costello) - 2:55
2. "Souls on Fire" (Paul Weller, Tracie Young)
3. "Nothing Happens Here But You" (Paul Weller) - 3:25
4. "I Can't Hold On Till Summer" (Paul Barry, John Robinson) - 3:54
5. "Dr. Love" (Paul Weller) - 4:08
6. "Thank You" (General Johnson) - 4:00
7. "Moving Together" (Paul Barry, John Robinson) - 4:05
8. "Spring, Summer, Autumn" (Paul Weller) - 2:32
9. "What Did I Hear You Say" (Paul Barry, John Robinson) - 3:13
10. "Far from the Hurting Kind" (Paul Weller) - 4:05

1996 Japanese CD reissue bonus tracks

11. "I Can't Hold On Till Summer" (alternate take)
12. "Thank You" (instrumental version)
13. "Fingers Crossed" (Heartbeat demo)
14. "Fingers Crossed"
15. "I Think You're Lucky"
16. "Far from the Hurting Kind" (early version 1)
17. "Far from the Hurting Kind" (early version 2)

2010 Cherry Red Records CD reissue track listing

1. "The House That Jack Built" (P. Barry, J. Robinson) - 3:26
2. "(I Love You) When You Sleep" (Elvis Costello) - 2:55
3. "Souls on Fire" (12" version) (Paul Weller, Tracie Young) - 7:13
4. "Nothing Happens Here But You" (Paul Weller) - 3:25
5. "I Can't Hold On Till Summer" (P. Barry, J. Robinson) - 3:54
6. "Dr. Love" (Paul Weller) - 4:08
7. "Give It Some Emotion" (Chris Free, Lucy Loquette) - 4:03
8. "Thank You" (General Johnson) - 4:00
9. "Moving Together" (P. Barry, J. Robinson) - 4:05
10. "Spring, Summer, Autumn" (Paul Weller) - 2:32
11. "What Did I Hear You Say" (P. Barry, J. Robinson) - 3:13
12. "Far from the Hurting Kind" (Paul Weller) - 4:05
13. "Mama Never Told Me" (P. Hurtt, A. Bell) - 2:27
14. "Find It in Your Nature" (T. Young, S. Pisano, Tracie Young) - 3:51
15. "The Boy Hairdresser" (Paul Weller, Tracie Young) - 3:35
16. "Same Feelings Without the Emotion" (P. Barry, J. Robinson) - 3:13
17. "Give It Some Emotion" (2009 live radio session) (Chris Free, Lucy Loquette) - 4:39
18. "Nothing Happens Here But You" (2008 live radio session) (Paul Weller) - 3:41
19. "Invitation" (demo) (Tracie Young) - 4:53
20. "Give It Some Emotion" (original 12" extended remix) (Chris Free, Lucy Loquette) - 5:30

== Personnel ==
- Tracie Young - vocals
- Jake Fluckery - guitar
- Kevin Miller - bass, backing vocals
- Helen Turner - keyboards
- Steve Sidelnyk - drums
