= Revolution (The Dubliners album) =

Studio album by The Dubliners
- Released: 1970
- Genre: Irish folk
- Label: EMI/Columbia
- Producer: Phil Coulter

The Dubliners chronology
A Drop of The Dubliners (1969)	Revolution (1970)	Hometown! (1972)

Revolution is the tenth album by The Dubliners. It was their second to be produced by Phil Coulter. This album marked a landmark in their career. The group's sound had developed and Coulter, as well as playing piano on the record, had brought in other instrumentalists as well. The album featured "Scorn Not His Simplicity", a song that Coulter had composed about his own son, who had Down syndrome, as well as a poem penned by Luke Kelly entitled "For What Died The Sons Of Róisín?".

The album was released on CD by Chyme Records in 1994, with a re-ordered track listing.

== Track listing ==
=== Side one ===
1. "Alabama '58"
2. "The Captains and the Kings"
3. "School Days Over"
4. "Sé Fáth Mo Bhuartha"
5. "Scorn Not His Simplicity"
6. "For What Died the Sons of Róisín?"
7. "Joe Hill"

=== Side two ===
1. "Ojos Negros"
2. "The Button Pusher"
3. "The Bonny Boy"
4. "The Battle of the Somme/Freedom Come-All-Ye"
5. "Biddy Mulligan"
6. "The Peat Bog Soldiers"
