= Scorn Not His Simplicity =

Song written by Phil Coulter

Single by The Dubliners

from the album Revolution
- A-side: "Hand Me Down My Bible"
- Released: 1971
- Genre: Irish folk
- Label: EMI
- Songwriter: Phil Coulter

"Scorn Not His Simplicity" is a song written by the Irish musician and songwriter Phil Coulter and performed on his albums Classic Tranquility and The Songs I Love So Well.

The song has also been performed by several Irish musicians, including Luke Kelly, Sinéad O'Connor, Paddy Reilly, The Dubliners, Sonny Knowles, The Irish Tenors, Celtic Thunder, Paul Byrom, George Donaldson, and Mike Denver.

== Background ==
Phil Coulter's first son was born with Down syndrome, and several months later the father wrote the song "Scorn Not His Simplicity" about his experiences with his son's disorder. He first played the song to Luke Kelly. Because of the personal sentiment of the song, Luke Kelly felt that the song should not be sung except for special occasions, and not during every performance. The song appears on The Dubliners 1970 LP Revolution.

== Composition ==
The song is unusual in the chorus as it has an 6th minor chord going into an 4th minor chord. Coulter explains that, "I do it in C so it's an A minor chord going into an F minor and that's unusual. Funny enough a critic said that it's that second chord that makes you kind of pay attention. There's that sadness with the two minor chords". Coulter has said that he wrote the song with Luke Kelly's voice in his head.

== Other versions ==
Coulter has said that, "One of the songs I am immensely proud of is Scorn Not His Simplicity because it was recorded by two of the finest voices Ireland ever produced: Sinéad and Luke. And I thought that when Luke recorded Scorn Not that "This is the definitive version. This is the song. … Sinéad's version was completely different: more tender; more female; more vulnerable; more Sinéad!"

Coulter stated on "The Ireland Podcast" that, whilst producing Universal Mother, Sinéad O'Connor asked, "Do you know that song about that mentally challenged child that Luke Kelly sings?" Coulter then played it on the piano and explained to an unaware O'Connor that he wrote it, and it was about his child.

In the same podcast, Coulter stated that he and O'Connor recorded the song in Lombard Studios, Dublin with Tony Harris engineering the recording. The version recorded is the first and only recording of the song in the studio. Coulter said that, after the performance, "I sat exactly where I was. Sinéad stood where she was. Tony Harris had got the wit not to f**king speak and not to do anything, so we just all stayed exactly where we were to savour the moment. We knew something special had just happened, you know? We knew we had just created something worthwhile".

== See also ==
- List of Irish ballads
