= The Valves =

1970s Scottish punk rock band

- Publicity photo taken by Paul Slatterly, circa 1977

Background information
- Origin: Edinburgh, Scotland
- Genres: Punk rock
- Years active: 1977–1979
- Labels: Zoom, Albion
- Members: Dave Robertson; Ronnie Mackinnon; Gordon Scott; Gordon Dair
- Website: www.thevalves.co.uk

The Valves were a punk rock band from Edinburgh, Scotland. One of the early British punk bands, they were chronicled in Henrik Poulsen's book 77: The Year of Punk and New Wave, and featured Dave Robertson as 'Dee Robot' on vocals, G. Dair / Teddy Dair a.k.a. Gordon Dair on drums, Gordon Scott or 'Pada' on bass guitar and Ronnie Mackinnon on guitar.

The Valves released three singles and then broke up in 1979. They reformed for a one-off gig in Edinburgh 21 December 2013. In 2015, Ronnie, Pada and Gordon joined up with Joe Donkin, of The Cheetahs and Gordon Mackinnon, on keyboards. They are currently touring under The Valves name, playing material from the Valves, the Cheetahs and new material. Dave/Dee now lives in Belgium. In 2020, they self released a retrospective LP, entitled Better Late... comprising material from 1977/78 and live versions of the singles from the reunion gig.

== Members ==
- Dee Robot (Dave Robertson) - vocals
- Ronnie (Ronnie Mackinnon) - guitar
- Pada (Gordon Scott) - bass
- G.Dair / Teddy (Gordon Dair) - drums (died 2022)
- Joe Donkin - vocals
- G.Mac / Gogsmac (Gordon Mackinnon) - keyboards

== Discography ==
=== Albums ===
- Better Late... (Portobello Record Company - PORTY001 - 13 March 2020)

=== Singles ===
- "Robot Love" / "For Adolfs Only" (Zoom - September 1977)
- "Ain't No Surf in Portobello" / "Tarzan of the Kings Road" (Zoom - December 1977)
- "It Don't Mean Nothing at All" / "Linda Vindaloo" (Albion - June 1979)
