= The Questions =

Scottish pop band

- Origin: Edinburgh, Scotland
- Genres: Blues-rock, pop, rock
- Years active: 1977–1984
- Labels: Zoom Records; Respond Records
- Past members: Paul Barry; Frank Mooney; John Robinson; Stephen Lennon; Chris Kowalski; Joseph Jones; Maureen Barry
- Website: Myspace page

The Questions were a Scottish pop band, active during the late 1970s and early 1980s.

== History ==
The Questions formed in the summer of 1977 at St. Augustine's High School in Edinburgh, and performed their first gig in December of that year at St. Margaret's Church Hall in Davidson's Mains, a suburb of Edinburgh.

The following year, they sent a demo tape of rehearsals to Bruce Findlay of Bruce's Record Shop, which led to signing a recording contract with Zoom Records in Edinburgh in 1978. The band's first single was "Some Other Guy" backed with "Rock & Roll Ain't Dead" (August 1978). They were crowned Young Band of the Year by Southern Television on Saturday Banana in December 1978.

"I Can't Get Over You" b/w "Answers" followed in January 1979. The band subsequently left school in June 1980 and came to the attention of Paul Weller, with "Get Away from It All", a track that was never officially released. The band supported the Jam at the Edinburgh Playhouse Theatre on the first of many occasions in October 1980, and signed to Weller's fledgling Respond Records in 1981. The Questions contributed three songs to Respond's Love the Reason album - "Work and Play", "Building on a Strong Foundation" and "Give It Up Girl". They also contributed to the track "Mama Never Told Me" with Tracie Young as Tracie & the Questions. Many tours, TV appearances and singles followed, including "Work and Play", "Tear Soup" and "Price You Pay". In 1983, band members Paul Barry and John Robinson penned the top 10 hit "The House That Jack Built" for fellow Respond Records label mate Tracie Young. They would go on to write three additional songs - "I Can't Hold on Till Summer", "Moving Together" and "What Did I Hear You Say" - for Young's debut LP, Far from the Hurting Kind.

In 1984, Belief, the band's only full-length album, was finally released. "Tuesday Sunshine" and "A Month of Sundays" were released as singles. The album did not sell well, and the band played their final concert on 30 November 1984, at the 100 Club in Oxford Street, London.

After a twelve-year wait, Belief was issued on CD by the Japanese label Trattoria Records. The re-issue included the album's original eleven songs, plus eight previously unreleased tracks.

== Members ==
- Paul Barry - bass guitar, vocals
- John Robinson - rhythm guitar, vocals
- Frank Mooney - drums
- Stephen Lennon - lead guitar, vocals
- Chris Kowalski - drums
- Joseph Jones - keyboards, clarinet
- Maureen Barry - vocals

== Discography ==
=== Albums ===
- Belief (1984)

=== Singles ===
- "Some Other Guy" / "Rock & Roll Ain't Dead" (1978)
- "I Can't Get Over You" / "Answers" (1979)
- "Work and Play" / "Saved by the Bell" (1982)
- "Price You Pay" / "The Groove Line" (1983) - UK No. 56
- "Tear Soup" / "The Vital Spark" (1983) - UK No. 66
- "Tuesday Sunshine" / "No One" (1984) - UK No. 46
- "A Month of Sundays" / "Someone's Got to Lose" (1984)
- "Building on a Strong Foundation" / "Dream Come True" (1984)
