= Russell Webb (musician) =

Scottish bass guitarist (born 1958)

- Born: 1958 (age 67–68); Glasgow, Scotland
- Genres: Glam rock, soft rock, punk rock, new wave, power pop, post-punk, indie rock
- Occupations: Musician, record producer, composer
- Instruments: Bass guitar, backing vocals, guitar, keyboards, percussion
- Years active: 1977–present
- Formerly of: Slik, PVC2, Zones, Skids, The Armoury Show, Public Image Ltd
- Website: www.myspace.com/russellwebbmusic

Russell Webb (born 1958 in Glasgow, Scotland) is a Scottish new wave bass guitarist who was a member of bands such as Slik, PVC2 (both with Midge Ure), Zones, Skids, the Armoury Show and Public Image Ltd and collaborated with Richard Jobson, Virginia Astley and the Who.

== Career ==
=== Slik and PVC2 ===
Future Ultravox and Live Aid organiser, guitarist and singer Midge Ure, drummer Kenny Hyslop, keyboardist Billy McIsaac and bassist Jim McGinlay had been gaining commercial successes as a band named Slik, playing in a variety of styles, such as glam, soft rock and bubblegum pop. With the advent of punk rock, McGinlay left in early 1977. Webb, who had recently dropped out of university, replaced him. Shortly afterwards, the band changed their name to PVC2 and their musical style to punk. PVC2 released one single, "Put You in the Picture", in 1977.

=== Zones ===
Ure joined Glen Matlock's Rich Kids and by late 1977/early 1978, Webb and the rest of PVC2 called Alex Harvey's cousin Willie Gardner to replace him, founding Zones. This band released singles during 1978 and 1979 and one album titled Under Influence in the latter year. Due to lack of major success, the Zones split up shortly afterwards.

=== Skids ===
Webb joined Skids halfway through their career in February 1980, replacing co-founder William Simpson. He performed on the last two Skids albums, The Absolute Game released in 1980 and 1981's Joy. During that time, he collaborated with Jobson on his solo career and engineering the Who's new recordings, which were incomplete because that band split up.

=== The Armoury Show ===
After Skids broke up, he and Jobson along with guitarist John McGeoch (formerly of Magazine and Siouxsie and the Banshees) and drummer John Doyle (also of Magazine) formed the Armoury Show in 1983. They recorded one album titled Waiting for the Floods, which was critically acclaimed but a commercial letdown. The band released singles until 1988, when they broke up. The Armoury Show recorded a second album for Parlophone which was to feature a song entitled "I Will Find You" sung by Webb; however, Jobson and Webb disbanded the group before the album was released. Following a discussion with Jobson and Clive Black of Parlophone, Webb agreed to allow the album to be issued under Jobson's name, entitled Badman.

=== Public Image Ltd ===
In mid-to-end 1992, Webb joined John Lydon's post-Sex Pistols band Public Image Ltd, replacing bassist Allan Dias.

=== The Ring, Lost ===
After PiL, Webb formed his own band called the Ring, which toured Europe opening for Jerry Harrison of Talking Heads in promotion of his second solo album Casual Gods in 1988, but no commercial success followed. Webb retired from performing to design board games. Following a discussion with Richard Branson at the latter's knighthood party, Branson agreed to take Webb's first board game (4 years in the making) entitled Lost to Necker Island for play testing with his family and children. The play testing was a success, but no game was released. Instead it became the initial inspiration for JJ Abrams' hit TV show Lost, for which Webb was never credited. Webb continued to work on projects with his Armoury Show associate, John McGeoch, until the latter's death in 2004.

Webb contributes music to dramas by Blue Hours Productions, a company specializing in retro horror/sci-fi/fantasy drama for radio and the internet.

He lives in England.
