= Jake Hooker (musician) =

Israeli musician (1953–2014)

- Also known as: Jake Richards, Jake Falsworth
- Born: Jerry Mamberg; May 3, 1953; Haifa, Israel
- Died: August 4, 2014 (aged 61) Malibu, California, U.S.
- Genres: Glam rock; pop
- Occupations: Musician; manager
- Instrument: Guitar
- Years active: 1972–1978
- Formerly of: Arrows
- Spouse: Lorna Luft (m. 1977; div. 1993)

Jerry Mamberg (May 3, 1953 – August 4, 2014), often known as Jake Hooker, Jake Richards, or Jake Falsworth, was a musician, best known as the guitarist for the rock/pop band Arrows.

== Life ==
Mamberg was born in Haifa, Israel, but his family moved to the United States when he was a child. He later moved to England, and in 1972 joined forces with his friend Alan Merrill, at the time well-known in Japan, to found the band Streak (in which Mamberg appeared and was credited as 'Jake Falsworth'), a band which later evolved into the Arrows (in which he appeared as 'Jake Hooker'). The band had several hit records produced by Mickie Most. Merrill wrote the song "I Love Rock 'n' Roll" for the Arrows, giving a co-writer credit to Hooker by way of settling a debt. It was a response to The Rolling Stones' "It's Only Rock 'n Roll (But I Like It)". The song, recorded in 1975 and originally relegated by Most to a b-side, has gone on to become a rock classic. The Arrows broke ground by hosting their own weekly TV series, Arrows, which showcased many top glam rock acts, on the UK Granada ITV network.

Hooker married actress/singer Lorna Luft in London on Valentine's Day 1977. He retired as a musician in 1978 when the Arrows disbanded, moving to Los Angeles to manage Luft. Their marriage ended in divorce, following which he continued to reside in Los Angeles, working as a publisher, producer, manager, and entrepreneur, until his death.

He died in Malibu on August 4, 2014, aged 61.

== Family ==
Hooker and Luft were divorced in 1993. They had two children together, a son Jesse (b. April 1984) and a daughter Vanessa (b. September 1990).
