= My Last Night with You =

Single by Arrows
- B-side: "Movin' Next Door to You"
- Released: 1975
- Label: RAK Records
- Songwriter(s): Roger Ferris, Glo Macari
- Producer(s): Mickie Most

Arrows singles chronology
"Toughen Up" (1974)	"My Last Night with You" (1975)	"I Love Rock N Roll" (1975)

"My Last Night with You" was a UK top 30 chart hit record for the band Arrows in 1975 produced by Mickie Most.

A soulful ballad, the song was written by Roger Ferris and Glo Macari, and sung by Arrows lead vocalist Alan Merrill.

The brass arrangement was done by John Cameron and played by the CCS horn section.
