= Endgames (band) =

Scottish pop band (1980–1985)

- Also known as: The Enjoyment Club
- Origin: Glasgow, Scotland
- Genres: New wave, synthpop
- Years active: 1980–1985
- Labels: Mercury, Virgin, MCA
- Past members: David Rudden; David Murdoch; Douglas Muirden; Willie Gardner; David Wilde; Brian McGee

Endgames were a Scottish pop band active during the 1980s. They released two albums on Virgin Records, but failed to achieve significant commercial success.

== History ==
=== Origins and early years ===
Endgames was formed in Glasgow, Scotland by David Rudden (bass, vocals) and David Murdoch (keyboards).

The band began through gigging at clubs and colleges in Glasgow, Scotland, and eventually appeared as a support act for the band Simple Minds in late December 1979, for which they received a rather lukewarm mention at the "New Musical Express" ("Pleasant rather disturbing, End Game [sic] have some good, if half-formed ideas...but at least they don't sound like the Berlin Blondes").

During the second half of 1980, Endgames played in the London area (joined with drummer David Wilde). Their early style is represented on various artists compilations recordings released during 1980–1981: Beyond the Groove and Live Letters (both on Polydor Records), which documented bands that played in the well-known South London club 101; and Heat from the Street (on Charisma).

Endgames attracted interest from BBC Radio 1 DJ John Peel, and recorded their first session for his show (broadcast in March 1981). Recordings were done not only in London, but in Glasgow, too - for example, Endgames were the last band to do a recording session at the second home of Ca Va Studios in May 1981. During this time they played synth-rock characterized by cold-sounding synths, stiff rhythms and dark, brooding vocals reminiscent of Philip Oakey. This didn't sit well with the labels searching for the "next big thing" or the press, generally not very supportive of the "futurist"/electronic movement.

Soon, however, their music started to show a much more commercial approach, with David Murdoch and David Rudden rediscovering youth influences in disco music of the 1970s (Boney M., Barry White, Marshall Hain). The record companies, indifferent to their earlier style, quickly showed an interest in the wake of success of such bands as Haircut 100 and ABC. First Endgames signed with Warner - "for a week then they decided they didn't want us". But they were quickly taken on board by Mercury (a subdivision of Phonogram), with which the band signed a basic two singles deal in Spring 1982. "Our aims are to make aggressively commercial music - that means aggressive and commercial in equal measures", - commented David Rudden. By that time the line-up changed and expanded, with Wilde joining Altered Images he was replaced by Brian McGee (who left Simple Minds in mid 1981), and Douglas Muirden (saxophone, keyboards) being added.

In April, their debut single "We Feel Good (Future's Looking Fine)" was released. With its writing credited to The Enjoyment Club (their short-lived moniker), it was produced by John Leckie (famed for his work with Simple Minds, Magazine, Bill Nelson, XTC etc.). The single received support from ABC's Martin Fry who commented on its "tremendous potential that might borrow from Chic's "I Want Your Love" but maintains interest from start to finish...when Endgames get a mix that gives them more clarity they'll enjoy chart success". The band also recorded the second "Peel Session", showcasing their new direction.

October saw the release of their second single, catchy synthpop "First-Last-For Everything" (featured in the recent "Peel Session"), produced by Steve Levine (soon famed for the production work with Culture Club). It found success in clubs in Europe and North America, receiving significant airplay in Canada, especially on the "alternative" radio station CFNY-FM (Toronto), while in the US it was a club success, with the DJ-oriented remix service Disconet choosing it for a dance edit treatment. Eventually it charted in the Billboard magazine Disco/Dance Chart, peaking at No. 31.

Still, the hoped mass commercial success wasn't forthcoming and Mercury chose not to continue with the band. Soon offers came flooding in from other major record companies, creating a "bidding war". It was won by Virgin Records, with which Endgames signed for the UK and Europe. The US labels also sought to contract the band - among the "power players" that showed enough interest to travel to Glasgow to meet the band were Tommy Mottola (then of The Champion Entertainment Organization, later president of Sony Music), Ed Leffler and Bill Aucoin (manager of Kiss and Billy Idol). Eventually MCA Records succeeded in signing them for the North-American market with Aucoin becoming their manager. By that time the line-up officially expanded to sextet with the addition of Willie Gardner (guitar, backing vocals, bass) - former leader of the promising Scottish power pop/new wave band Zones, who also released a couple of solo singles.

=== Commercial semi-success and break-up ===
The first single in this third phase of the band's career was "Waiting for Another Chance", released in July 1983. It became a substantial hit in Scotland, but didn't appear on the UK charts (Scotland is treated as a regional market so anything that sells strongly there but has little success elsewhere isn't allowed to appear on the national chart). However, the song was well received in West Germany where, after the appearance on the TV music show Formel Eins and aided by a colourful videoclip (modelled after the UK 12" cover with the Japanese fan motif), it became a sizeable hit (No. 21 in September). The song also briefly charted in Switzerland.

In October 1983, Virgin released their first album Building Beauty, produced by Colin Campsie and George McFarlane of the dance-pop duo The Quick. It was a polished album with the sentimental but upbeat sound in vein of the "technologically enhanced blue-eyed soul and funk" of ABC and Heaven 17 (who themselves sought to update the classic Motown sound for the 80s), with vocal stylings recalling Michael Jackson at times. The album's liner notes reveal heavy use of the latest advancements in music technology to augment and enhance the "standard" instrumentation (like piano, drums, guitars and saxophone): electronic drums and drum machines (Simmons, LinnDrum), synthesizers (Korg Polysix, PPG Wave, Roland Jupiter-4, Minimoog, Oberheim OB-Xa), computers (J.J. Jeczalik of The Art of Noise is credited with Fairlight programming). Building Beauty was greeted enthusiastically in some publications with Betty Page proclaiming in Record Mirror: "Endgames has come up trumps with a debut elpee every bit as spirited and accomplished as True".

Building Beauty was released in the USA in February 1984 with a slightly different running order. "Waiting for Another Chance" and "Love Cares" were serviced to radio stations and clubs as promos, with their accompanying clips distributed through music video services like Telegenics and RockAmerica. Additionally, their songs "Desire" and "Ecstasy" received attention from the R&B radio (especially the latter - in the form of a "Centurion Mix", released on the B-side of "Miracle in My Heart" 12", which became popular as an import). "Love Cares" charted in Billboard, reaching No. 47 on the Disco/Dance Chart, but MCA didn't promote the band enough so the actual sales weren't strong with the album failing to chart. Meanwhile, Endgames toured as a support to Howard Jones during his sold-out first tour of the UK in March–April 1984. But the single "Desire" (fourth off the album), failed to catch on. so it sold poorly. Virgin then ended their contract and not long afterwards Endgames disbanded.

== Legacy ==
The band's most enduring song proved to be First-Last-For Everything, which regularly appears on various European compilations of '80s pop and new wave is now considered a cult underground dance hit, meanwhile occasionally getting played by radio stations like CFNY during "retro" shows. "Ecstasy" endured popularity on R&B radio and turned into a source of samples in the field of hip-hop. In 1994, the song was sampled by rap group Heavy D & The Boyz on the title track of their album Nuttin' but Love, which became a noticeable hit (No. 40 on the Billboard Hot 100, Top 20 on R&B and Hot Rap Tracks charts), while the album reached No. 11 on the Billboard Top 200, topped the R&B/Hip-Hop Albums chart and was certified Double Platinum. In 2007, "Ecstasy" was sampled by rapper Lil' Flip on his track "Flippin'" from the album I Need Mine (No. 15 on the Billboard Top 200 and Top 5 on Top R&B/Hip-Hop and Top Rap Albums charts).

== Discography ==
=== Albums ===
- Building Beauty (1983) [LP: V 2287 / Cassette: TCV 2287]
- Natural (1985) [Virgin – 206 975-620, Virgin – 206 975]

=== Singles ===
Mercury/Phonogram

- "We Feel Good (Future's Looking Fine)" (April 1982) [7": GAME 1 / 12": GAME 12]
- "First-Last-For Everything" (October 1982) [7": GAME 2 / 12": GAME 12]

Virgin Records

- "Waiting for Another Chance" (June 1983) [7": VS 605 / 12": VS 605-12]
- "Love Cares" (September 1983) [7": VS 617 / Shaped Picture Disc: VSS 617 / 12": VS 617-12]
- "Miracle in My Heart" (31 October 1983) [7": VS 640 / 12": VS 640-12]
- "Desire" (March 1984) [7": VS 651 / 12": VS 651-12]
