= Jim McGinlay =

Scottish bass guitarist (born 1949)

- Also known as: Jim Slik
- Born: 9 March 1949 (age 76)
- Origin: Lennoxtown, Stirlingshire Scotland
- Genres: Glam rock, soft rock,
- Occupation: Musician
- Instrument: bass guitar
- Years active: C. 1964 – present

James Anthony McGinlay (born 9 March 1949 in Lennoxtown, Stirlingshire, Scotland) is a Scottish bass guitarist who formed along his elder brother Kevin a hard-rock band called Salvation, in Glasgow, which after numerous line-up changes included Midge Ure, future Ultravox frontman and Live 8 contributor, Billy McIsaac and Kenny Hyslop.

By 1964, he began his musical career, forming The Strollers, along his brothers Kevin on lead guitar and Hugh on rhythm guitar and cousin Ernie Slater on drums, in which he played bass guitar. In the rest of years of the 1960s he was in another three bands, the last of them, the second with his brother Kevin, called Friendly Persuasion, which became famous.

In June 1970, Friendly Persuasion disbanded and Jim and Kevin formed Salvation, a pop supergroup with Nod Kerr on drums, Mario Tortolano on organ, and Ian Kenny on lead guıtar. Kenny left in December 1970 and was replaced by Brian Denniston and Kerr left around May 1971, being replaced by Matt Caırns. They also had Robin Bırrel on organ for a while. James Ure (shortly afterwards named Midge Ure) on lead guıtar, Billy McIsaac on organ and Kenny Hyslop on drums joined the brothers in March 1972. That membership remained until Kevin left in April 1974, so the remaining members changed the band name to Slik. The band had numerous musical styles including glam and soft rock, and after failed promising hits and the arrival of punk rock, McGinlay left the band in March 1977, being replaced by Russell Webb, but the band lasted until September and with another name, PVC2.

Later he joined his brother Kevin's band Revival, that until now are active (but without Kevin).
