= Billy McIsaac =

Scottish musician (born 1949)

- Born: William McIsaac; 12 July 1949 (age 76)
- Origin: Rothesay, Argyll and Bute, Scotland
- Genres: Glam rock, soft rock, punk rock, new wave
- Occupation: Musician
- Instruments: Keyboards, guitar, vocals
- Years active: 1972–2012

Billy McIsaac (born William McIsaac, 12 July 1949 in Rothesay, Scotland) is a musician, who played mainly keyboards since his early days with different pop bands.

== Biography ==
Previously, he worked as a telephone engineer and played with a band called The Bubbles. In 1972, he joined Salvation, formed by brothers Kevin and Jim McGinlay, along with drummer Kenny Hyslop and guitarist Midge Ure. After Kevin McGinlay left in 1974, the band became Slik and began to release singles, among them, two hits: "Forever and Ever" and "Requiem", both released in eponymous singles, in 1975 and 1976, respectively. Slik fame was growing during 1976, but late that year, punk rock bands were hitting the musical scene, so in 1977, the band changed their name, to PVC2, after McGinlay was replaced by Russell Webb, and began to play as the latter bands did. In September 1977, Midge Ure left PVC2, and the rest called Willie Gardner to replace him, and the band renamed themselves as Zones. Zones lasted until 1979, and the band finally split up. McIsaac and Hyslop continued with a project called Science, a band considered as a continuation of Zones, but only McIsaac was the supposedly remaining member. Hyslop and bassist Russell Webb joined The Skids, Ure joined Thin Lizzy, Ultravox and Visage and the McGinlay brothers were working alone again.

He had also a solo career, releasing "Love Me Like You Did Before" as a single.

In 1990, he studied piano performance at the Royal Academy of Music, in Glasgow.

In 1995, along with singer Maureen McMullan and saxophonist/keyboardist Gordon Bowie, he formed the Billy McIsaac Band, who claim to be the number-1 wedding band in Scotland. He retired from the band as of 2012.
