= Bill Martin (songwriter) =

Scottish songwriter (1938–2020)

Bill Martin MBE
- Born: William Wylie MacPherson; 9 November 1938; Govan, Glasgow, Scotland
- Died: 26 March 2020 (aged 81) London, England
- Genre: Pop music
- Occupations: Songwriter, music publisher, impresario
- Years active: 1960s–2020
- Website: http://www.billmartinsongwriter.com/

William Wylie MacPherson MBE (9 November 1938 – 26 March 2020), known professionally as Bill Martin, was a Scottish songwriter, music publisher and impresario. His most successful songs, all written with Phil Coulter, included "Puppet on a String", "Congratulations", "Back Home", and "Saturday Night". He was presented with three Ivor Novello Awards, including one as Songwriter of the Year.

== Biography ==
Bill Martin was born William Wylie MacPherson in Govan, Glasgow, Scotland, to Ian and Letitia (Letty) and had an older brother, Ian. They lived in Taransay Road, Govan, near the Fairfield shipyard. Martin was educated at Govan High School, three years ahead of Alex Ferguson; in 2011, they were both inducted into the inaugural Govan High Hall of Fame.

After World War II, many of the Glasgow tenements were pulled down and the MacPherson family moved to Priesthill, a new housing scheme on the south side of Glasgow. Having tried, and failed to build a career in the shipyards, Martin completed his apprenticeship as a marine engineer. Although he had actually written his first song at 10 years of age, it was during his apprenticeship that he heard Bobby Darin's song "Dream Lover" which convinced him that his future lay in songwriting.

He studied at the Royal Academy of Music, and had trials to become a professional footballer for Partick Thistle. In 1960, Martin and his new bride, Margaret (Mag) went to South Africa, where he played football for Johannesburg Rangers. On their return, he determined to make songwriting his primary focus, and began using the name Bill Martin as he thought that Wylie MacPherson was "too Scottish". He spent months working in Denmark Street and finally, in 1963, he had his first song released on record, with "Kiss Me Now" by Tommy Quickly. The song was released on 22 November 1963, the same day that President John F. Kennedy was assassinated, and light-hearted songs were not the order of the day.

In 1964, Martin entered into a writing partnership with Tommy Scott. As Scott & Martin he had success with such acts as the Irish trio The Bachelors, Twinkle, the Irish folk band The Dubliners, Van Morrison, and Serge Gainsbourg.

In 1965, Martin met Phil Coulter and the two became established as a successful songwriting team that lasted more than ten years (Martin for the lyrics, Coulter for the melody). They had records with such (mostly UK) acts as comedian and baritone Ken Dodd, American R&B artist Geno Washington, Los Bravos, Dave Dee & Co, The Troggs, Mireille Mathieu, Dick Emery, Tony Blackburn, Billy Connolly, Cilla Black, The Foundations, Cliff Richard, Sandie Shaw, and Elvis Presley.

Between 1967 and 1976 they had four No. 1 hits in the UK: "Puppet on a String", "Congratulations", "Back Home" and "Forever and Ever". Martin is the only Scottish songwriter to pen four UK number one hits for four different acts. There were also numerous Top 10 hits including the Bay City Rollers' "Shang-A-Lang", "Fancy Pants" by the glam rock band Kenny, and "Surround Yourself with Sorrow" by Cilla Black. In 1975, Martin and Coulter were joint recipients of an Ivor Novello Award for 'Songwriter of the Year'.

The Bay City Rollers had a No. 1 hit in 1976 in the U.S. Billboard Hot 100 chart with "Saturday Night", a song that was not released as a single in the UK. There were three No. 1 hits in the US for the songwriters, the other two (which were chart-toppers on the Billboard Hot Country Songs and the Adult Contemporary listings respectively) being "Thanks", performed by Bill Anderson, and "My Boy", sung by Elvis Presley.

In the early 1970s, Martin bought the former home of John Lennon – Kenwood, St. George's Hill – although he later sold it and lived in Belgravia, London and Southampton, Hampshire. He also owned a house in Val Do Lobo, Portugal which he bought in the early 1970s.

The songwriters also wrote for the films The Water Babies and Carry On and a number of television theme songs. Having triumphed in the 1967 Eurovision Song Contest with "Puppet on a String", the first UK entry to win the competition, they finished second the following year in 1968 with "Congratulations" from Cliff Richard. In April 1968, the British music magazine NME reported that Martin and Coulter were being sued by the Irish songwriters Shay O'Donoghue and Aiden Magennis, claiming that "Congratulations" had the same chord sequence as their song "Far Away From You", recorded eighteen months earlier by Doc Carroll & the Royal Blues.

In 1975, Martin and Coulter reached the Eurovision final for the third time, this time writing Luxembourg's entry, "Toi", for Coulter's future wife, the Irish singer Geraldine. The song finished fifth in Stockholm. Their final attempt at Eurovision glory was in 1978, when their song "Shine It On" finished third in the UK heat A Song for Europe sung by the Glaswegian, Christian.

As successful songwriters, record producers and music publishers, Martin and Coulter became a wealthy and powerful partnership in the music industry. Apart from being writers-producers of their own songs, they started a publishing company called Martin-Coulter Music, and signed such other songwriters as Van Morrison, Billy Connolly, Christy Moore, Dónal Lunny, Eric Bogle, Sky, Midge Ure and B. A. Robertson.

Although he continued to write music, Martin found himself gravitating to the business side of the music industry by the 1980s. His partnership with Coulter ended in 1983 when Martin bought out Coulter's share of the business. He later sold the company to EMI. In his business career, he successfully built up and sold numerous companies in such diverse fields as music publishing, marketing and properties.

In 1983 he produced the musical Jukebox, which had a six-month run in London's West End and was featured in the Royal Variety Performance of that year. Jukebox was the forerunner to the plethora of successful 'jukebox' musicals. In 1984, he was executive producer on the Elkie Brooks album, Screen Gems. Martin continued as a songwriter, music publisher and producer with Angus Publications.

Martin was awarded the Gold Badge Award, for services to the music industry, by the British Academy of Songwriters, Composers and Authors in October 2009. In November 2012, he received the Sunday Mail Living Legend Award.

In 2017, Martin published his autobiography, Congratulations. Songwriter To The Stars,

He had four children, two from his marriage to Mag, and another two from his second marriage to Jan Martin (nee Olley) whom he married in 1972.

Bill Martin died on 26 March 2020, aged 81.

== Honours and awards ==
- Awarded three Ivor Novello Awards, including one as 'Songwriter of the Year'
- Three ASCAP Awards
- Award of Excellence (Rio de Janeiro, 1967 and 1969)
- Yamaha Best Song Award (Japan, 1978)
- Songwriter of the Decade (Scotland, 1980)
- First British songwriter (with Phil Coulter) of the Eurovision Song Contest winner with "Puppet on a String" (1967)
- Served on the British Academy of Songwriters, Composers and Authors (1960s)
- Founding member of the Society of Distinguished Songwriters (SODS) (1972). He has also been King Sod three times.
- Variety Club Silver Heart Award for services to charity
- Freeman of the City of London, 1981
- Freeman of the City of Glasgow, 1987
- Appointed Member of the Order of the British Empire (MBE) for services to Music and Charity in Scotland (2014)
