= Phil Coulter =

Irish musician & songwriter (born 1942)

- Born: Philip Coulter; 19 February 1942 (age 84)
- Origin: Derry, Northern Ireland
- Genres: Folk, pop, traditional Irish
- Occupations: Musician, songwriter, record producer
- Instruments: Vocals, piano
- Years active: 1967–present
- Website: philcoulter.com

Philip Coulter (born 19 February 1942) is an Irish musician, songwriter and record producer from Derry, Northern Ireland. He was awarded the Gold Badge from the British Academy of Songwriters, Composers and Authors in October 2009.

Coulter has amassed 23 platinum discs, 39 gold discs, 52 silver discs, two Grand Prix Eurovision awards; five Ivor Novello Awards, which includes Songwriter of the Year; three American Society of Composers, Authors and Publishers awards; a Grammy Nomination; a Meteor Award, a National Entertainment Award and a Rose d'or d'Antibes. He is one of the biggest record sellers in the island of Ireland.

Some of his most well-known songs include "The Town I Loved So Well", "Puppet on a String" and "Congratulations".

== Early years ==
Coulter was born in Derry, Northern Ireland where his father (from Strangford, County Down) was one of a minority of Catholic policemen in the Royal Ulster Constabulary. His mother was from Belfast. He was the fourth child with two older brothers and a sister and one younger sister, each born with a year's difference between them, in a two-up two-down terraced house.

Coulter's father, also called Phil, encouraged music in the house. He played the fiddle whilst his wife played the upright piano. The younger Coulter recalls this piano, made by Challen, as "the most important piece of furniture in the house".

One of Coulter's most popular songs, "The Town I Loved So Well", deals with the embattled city of his youth, filled with "that damned barbed wire" during the Troubles.

== Education ==
Coulter spent his secondary school years at St. Columb's College. He later studied music and French at Queen's University Belfast (QUB).

== Beginnings of a career in music ==
He started his first band at Queen's University, playing early rock and roll music despite studying classical music. Coulter was also founder of the Glee Club, which staged music events for the university. By 1964, his final year at university, Coulter had already written a couple of hit songs in Ireland and he moved to London, where his first job was as an arranger/songwriter with a music publisher in Denmark Street. From here he was hired to work with acts including Billy Connolly, Van Morrison, Jerry Lee Lewis and Tom Jones.

He wrote "Foolin' Time" (1963), a hit for the Capitol Showband. Other songs he contributed to around that time included his arrangement of "Terry" (1964), a UK No. 4 hit for Twinkle, plus co-writing "I Can Only Give You Everything" with Tommy Scott, which was originally recorded by Them.

== Songwriting partnership with Bill Martin ==
In 1965, he met Bill Martin and the two became established as a successful songwriting team that lasted more than ten years (Martin for the lyrics, Coulter for the melody). They wrote Sandie Shaw's 1967 Eurovision-winning entry, "Puppet on a String", which became an international hit which was covered more than a hundred times. The following year their song "Congratulations", sung by Cliff Richard, came second in the Eurovision Song Contest. In 2008 a Spanish documentary alleged that Cliff Richard had been robbed of victory after General Francisco Franco fixed the vote. The person who made the claim in the documentary, José María Íñigo, said later that his words had been taken out of context.

Seven years after "Congratulations", another Coulter song, "Toi", co-written with Pierre Cour, was performed in Stockholm as the Luxembourg entry by Coulter's future wife Geraldine. Coulter conducted the orchestra for the song, which came fifth. Coulter and Martin also wrote "Shine It On", which finished third in the 1978 heat of A Song for Europe, performed by the Glaswegian performer Christian.

Between 1967 and 1976, Coulter and Martin had four No. 1 hits in the UK: "Puppet on a String", "Congratulations", "Back Home" and "Forever and Ever". There were also numerous Top 10 hits including the Bay City Rollers' "Shang-a-Lang", "Fancy Pants" by the glam rock band Kenny, and "Surround Yourself with Sorrow" by Cilla Black. In 1975, Martin and Coulter were joint recipients of an Ivor Novello Award for 'Songwriter of the Year'.

The Bay City Rollers had a No. 1 hit in 1976 in the US Billboard Hot 100 chart with the Coulter-Martin song "Saturday Night", a song that was not released as a single in the UK. There were three No. 1 hits in the US for the songwriters, the other two (which were chart-toppers on the Billboard Hot Country Songs and the Adult Contemporary listings respectively) being "Thanks", performed by Bill Anderson and "My Boy", the Coulter-Martin translation of a French song sung by Elvis Presley.

They also contributed incidental music to the 1967 Spider-Man television series, and Coulter also wrote the score to the 1978 film version of The Water Babies.

== Sideman and producer ==
As well as writing hit singles, Coulter produced three albums with Planxty. Christy Moore wrote:

"With no competition he gave us a shite contract and we signed everything away. All that said, 30 years on this album sounds good. He produced it well and ... (he had) the foresight and wherewithal to record the band at a time when no one else was listening.

Coulter produced The Dubliners 1973 album, Plain and Simple. He wrote or co-wrote many of the tracks.

Coulter produced, arranged and wrote most of Joe Dolan's 1983 album, Here and Now. The album featured several hit singles, including the Irish Top Ten hit "Deeper and Deeper". The album was released in South Africa as Yours Faithfully where it reached number one.

In 2007, Coulter joined with Sharon Browne, one of the originators of the successful Celtic Woman production, to collaborate on formation of a male version of that production called Celtic Thunder. A stage production at The Helix in Dublin was released on DVD as Celtic Thunder: The Show. Many of the tracks in the show, such as "That's a Woman" and "Heartbreaker", were written by Coulter. Coulter resigned from his position in 2011.

== Solo albums ==
In 1984, Coulter launched himself as an artist in his own right and began by releasing a solo instrumental album called Classic Tranquility. His follow-up, Sea of Tranquility, peaked at No. 46 in the UK Albums Chart, and remained in the chart for fourteen weeks. The follow-up album, Phil Coulter's Ireland reached No. 86 in the UK.

He moved from London back to Ireland, where he established his music publishing company on the grounds of his house in Bray, south of Dublin. Coulter's official website notes that he has some 23 platinum records, 39 gold and 52 silver albums. He also keeps one of the walls of his office blank, "to remind me that there's still room for a lot more."

In the 1990s, Coulter's produced work for both Sinéad O'Connor and Boyzone.

In 2001, he was nominated for a Grammy Award in the "New Age" category for his album Highland Cathedral (2000).

On 28 October 2009, Coulter was presented with a BASCA Gold Badge Award in recognition of his unique contribution to music.

== Personal life ==
Coulter's first marriage was to Angela Coulter; their second child was born with Down's Syndrome and died aged four. With the encouragement of Luke Kelly, he wrote the song "Scorn Not His Simplicity" to help him get through the difficult time. Kelly recorded the song and it appeared on The Dubliners' 1970 LP Revolution, becoming the definitive version, later being recorded by several artists.

In 1974, Coulter was approached by Luxembourg to write a song for the Eurovision Song Contest 1975, following his success with "Puppet on a String", which won for the UK in 1967, and his "Congratulations" (recorded by Cliff Richard), which nearly won in 1968. Whilst looking for a singer he saw Geraldine Brannigan in a Guinness TV advert in Dublin and felt that he had to meet her. She went on to represent Luxembourg and came in fifth place. He later said in an interview on Miriam Meets... on RTÉ Radio 1 that it was love at first sight.

In November 1998, Coulter married Brannigan in a low-key ceremony at Wicklow registry office, witnessed by their six children, Danielle, Dominique, Alexandra, Daragh, Ryan and Georgina, and 16 guests. Coulter and his wife live in Bray, County Wicklow.

== Politics ==
Disregarding the broad international campaign against the Apartheid regime and the imprisonment of Nelson Mandela, Coulter performed in South Africa in May 1983 and his name was included in the register of entertainers who travelled to that country by the United Nations Centre Against Apartheid, which was published in 1986.

In 2002, Coulter was encouraged by the Save the Swilly organisation to run for the Dáil to protect Lough Swilly from aquacultural destruction. After some deliberation, he concluded that work and family commitments would not allow him the time necessary to fill the political position. Around that time, Coulter's brother died in a drowning incident in Ireland, which also caused him to retreat from the music industry for some time.

== Sport ==
Coulter is a former president of Derry City Football Club.

His son Ryan is a goalkeeper coach for the MLS Next Pro team FC Cincinnati 2, the reserve team of Major League Soccer's FC Cincinnati.

In 1995, the Irish Rugby Football Union commissioned Coulter to write a politically neutral anthem for the Ireland national rugby union team, which represents both Northern Ireland and the Republic of Ireland. The result was "Ireland's Call", which is played alongside, and in some cases instead of, "Amhrán na bhFiann". "Ireland's Call" has since also been adopted by the Ireland's national hockey, cricket and rugby league teams and by the singing group Celtic Thunder.

== Awards ==
Coulter has received honorary doctorates from the University of Ulster (1988), Dublin Institute of Technology (2006), and The Open University (2018). He was awarded the Freedom of the City of Derry on 5 April 2022.

== Discography ==
=== Albums ===
Year	Album	Peak positions	
Year	Album	Irish Albums Chart	UK Albums Chart
1983	Classic Tranquility		
1984	Sea of Tranquility		46
1985	Phil Coulter's Christmas		
1985	Phil Coulter's Ireland		86
1994	American Tranquility		
1997	Legends (with James Galway)		
1998	Winter's Crossing (with James Galway)		
1999	Healing Angel		
2000	Highland Cathedral		
2000	The Songs I Love So Well		
2000	Lake of Shadows	13	
2003	Coulter & Company	13	
2006	Timeless Tranquility	45	
2011	Reflections	36	
2019	Return to Tranquility	93	

== Entries in the Eurovision Song Contest ==
Coulter co-wrote three Eurovision Song Contest entries:

- "Puppet on a String" by Sandie Shaw, United Kingdom (Eurovision Song Contest 1967), 1st place
- "Congratulations" by Cliff Richard, United Kingdom (Eurovision Song Contest 1968), 2nd place
- "Toi" by Géraldine, Luxembourg (Eurovision Song Contest 1975), 5th place
