= Kenny Hyslop =

Scottish drummer (1951–2024)

- Born: Kenneth John Hyslop; 14 February 1951; Helensburgh, Scotland
- Died: 15 September 2024 (aged 73)
- Occupation: Musician
- Instrument: Drums
- Years active: 1970–2024
- Formerly of: Slik; PVC2; Zones; The Skids; Simple Minds; Set the Tone
- Website: myspace.com/kennyhyslop

Kenneth John Hyslop (14 February 1951 – 15 September 2024) was a Scottish drummer.

== Life and career ==
Hyslop was born in Helensburgh, Scotland, on 14 February 1951.

He joined the band Salvation with Midge Ure, which later became Slik and, after Ure's departure, some of the remaining members formed the Zones. He also went on to play with the Skids. In 1981, he joined Simple Minds, replacing Brian McGee. He contributed by recording "Promised You a Miracle" and appeared in the videos of "Sweat in Bullet" and "Love Song", from the Sons and Fascination album, which he did not appear on, but helped to promote. Following his departure from Simple Minds in 1982, Hyslop formed Set the Tone with bass player Bobby Paterson. Following the demise of Set the Tone, Hyslop formed the One O'Clock Gang which released an album on Arista Records.

Hyslop went on to write songs for Les McKeown and also toured with Midge Ure on his The Gift World Tour 1985. Hyslop became an alternative DJ until leaving the UK for Canada with the blues band, Big George and the Business. After returning to the UK, Hyslop started teaching drumming at Carlton Studios in Glasgow as well as producing new music published through Myspace.

Hyslop died on 15 September 2024 from prostate cancer, at the age of 73. He had announced the diagnosis shortly after his birthday that year.
