= Gary Glitter discography =

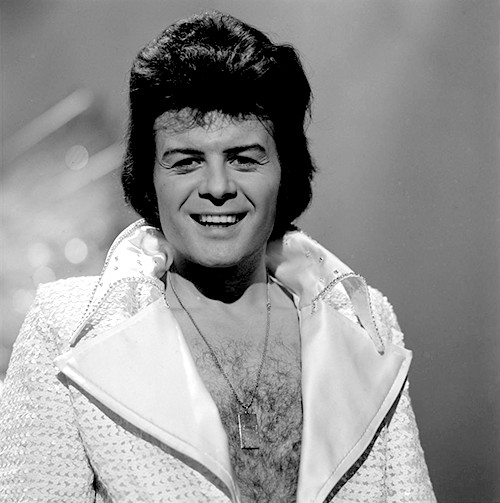
- Glitter on TopPop, 1974
- Studio albums: 7
- EPs: 1
- Live albums: 4
- Compilation albums: 13
- Singles: 42

English glam rock singer Gary Glitter (born Paul Francis Gadd) released seven studio albums, four live albums, 13 compilation albums, one extended play (EP) and 42 singles, including three UK number-one singles. He became known for his energetic live performances and extremely glam rock image of glitter suits, make-up, and platform boots.

In the early 1970s, Glitter had a sustained solo UK chart run of hits including "Rock and Roll (Parts 1 and 2)", "I Didn't Know I Loved You (Till I Saw You Rock and Roll)", "Do You Wanna Touch Me", "I Love You Love Me Love", "I'm the Leader of the Gang (I Am)", "Hello, Hello, I'm Back Again", "Remember Me This Way", "Always Yours", "Oh Yes! You're Beautiful", and "Doing Alright with the Boys". During his long career as a singer, Glitter undertook many tours to various venues around the world.

Glitter's popularity waned in the late 1970s, followed by a successful comeback as a solo artist from the 1980s; his 1984 song "Another Rock and Roll Christmas" became one of the most played Christmas songs of all time. Glitter spent the next decade mostly as an in-demand live performer, and mainly toured Britain.

Glitter sold over 20 million records and had 26 hit singles which spent a total of 180 weeks in the UK singles chart, with 12 reaching the top 10 and three of those charting at number one. Touch Me (1973) is Glitter's bestselling album, peaking at No. 2 on the UK Albums Chart. Glitter was an influence on a number of musicians and genres from the 1970s onwards, especially British punk, post-punk, new wave, gothic rock, Britpop and glam metal.

Glitter's live music career ended after he was imprisoned for downloading child pornography in 1999. He was also convicted of child sexual abuse in 2006 and of a series of sexual offences (including attempted rape) in 2015. In 2006 his back catalogue was made available via the Internet from sites such as iTunes and eMusic.

== Albums ==
=== Studio albums ===
Title	Album details	Peak chart positions					Certifications
Title	Album details	UK	AUS	FIN	GER	US	Certifications
Glitter	Released: October 1972; Label: Bell (UK); Formats: LP	8	8	23	36	186	BPI: Silver; AUS: Gold
Touch Me	Released: 1 June 1973; Label: Bell (UK); Formats: LP	2	11	1	21	—	BPI: Silver; AUS: Gold; IFPI FIN: Gold
G. G.	Released: 1975; Label: Bell (UK); Formats: LP	—	—	—	—	—	
Silver Star	Released: 5 April 1977; Label: Arista (UK); Formats: LP	—	—	—	—	—	
Boys Will Be Boys	Released: 1984; Label: Arista (UK); Formats: LP, cassette	—	—	—	—	—	
Leader II	Released: 1991; Label: Edel Music (UK); Formats: LP, CD	—	—	—	—	—	
On	Released: September 2001; Label: Machmain Ltd. (UK); Formats: CD	—	—	—	—	—	
"—" denotes items which were not released in that country or failed to chart.

=== Live albums ===
Title	Album details	Peak chart positions	
Title	Album details	UK	AUS
Remember Me This Way	Released: June 1974; Label: Bell; Formats: LP, cassette	5	12
Live and Kicking	Released: 1985; Label: American Phonograph; Formats: LP	—	—
Live and Alive	Released: 1988; Label: Imtrat; Formats: CD	—	—
Gary Glitter's Gangshow: The Gang, the Band, the Leader	Released: 1989; Label: Castle Communications (UK); Formats: LP, CD	—	—
Live in Concert	Released: 2005; Formats: CD	—	—
"—" denotes items which were not released in that country or failed to chart.

=== Compilation albums ===
Title	Album details	Peak chart positions	
Title	Album details	UK	NZ
Always Yours	Released: 1975; Label: Sounds Superb, Music for Pleasure, Bell; Formats: LP	—	—
Greatest Hits	Released: 1975; Formats: LP	33	4
I Love You Love Me Love	Released: 1977; Label: Pickwick; Formats: LP, 8-Trk	—	—
Golden Greats	Released: 1977; Label: GTO; Formats: LP	—	—
Leader	Released: 1984; Label: Epic; Formats: LP, cassette	—	—
C'mon... C'mon – The Gary Glitter Party Album	Released: 1987; Label: Telstar; Formats: LP, CD, cassette	—	—
Rock and Roll: Gary Glitter's Greatest Hits	Released: 1991; Label: Rhino; Formats: CD, cassette	—	—
Many Happy Returns – The Hits	Released: 1992; Label: EMI; Formats: LP, CD, cassette	35	—
20 Greatest Hits	Released: 1993; Label: Repertoire; Formats: CD	—	—
The Ultimate Gary Glitter – 25 Years of Hits	Released: 24 November 1997; Label: Snapper Music; Formats: CD	112	—
All That Glitters: The Best of Gary Glitter	Released: 2011; Label: Repertoire; Formats: CD	—	—
The Hey Song (Rock & Roll Part 2): The Greatest Hits	Released: 2011; Label: Snapper Music; Formats: CD	—	—
"—" denotes items which were not released in that country or failed to chart.

== Singles ==
=== 1970s ===
Year	A-side	B-side	Peak chart positions										Certifications
Year	A-side	B-side	UK	AUS	FRA	GER	AUT	NLD	IRE	BEL	SPA	US	Certifications
1972	"Rock and Roll; Part 1"	"Rock and Roll Part 2"	2	1	1	4	—	6	4	4	5	7	
1972	"I Didn't Know I Loved You (Till I Saw You Rock and Roll)"	"Hard on Me" (UK) "Shakey Sue" (US)	4	27	3	12	—	15	7	18	14	35	
1973	"Do You Wanna Touch Me"	"I Would If I Could But I Can't"	2	3	7	16	—	4	9	6	15	—	
1973	"Hello, Hello, I'm Back Again"	"I.O.U"	2	6	8	10	—	19	2	13	16	—	BPI: Silver
1973	"I'm the Leader of the Gang (I Am!)"	"Just Fancy That"	1	2	9	6	8	10	2	9	12	—	BPI: Gold
1973	"I Love You Love Me Love"	"Hands Up! It's a Stick Up"	1	2	9	8	6	10	2	19	11	—	BPI: Platinum
1974	"Remember Me This Way"	"It's Not a Lot (But It's All I Got)"	3	31	—	50	—	—	9	—	—	—	BPI: Silver
1974	"Always Yours"	"I'm Right, You're Wrong, I Win!"	1	11	—	14	—	—	1	—	—	—	BPI: Silver
1974	"Oh Yes! You're Beautiful"	"Thank You, Baby, For Myself"	2	10	—	28	—	—	1	—	—	—	BPI: Silver
1975	"Love Like You and Me"	"I'll Carry Your Picture (Everywhere)"	10	99	—	—	—	—	11	—	—	—	
1975	"Doing Alright with the Boys"	"Good for No Good"	6	—	—	—	—	—	3	—	—	—	
1975	"Papa-Oom-Mow-Mow"	"She-cat, Alley Cat"	38	—	9	—	—	—	20	—	—	—	
1976	"You Belong to Me"	"Rock and Roll (Part 1)"	40	—	—	—	—	—	—	—	—	—	
1976	"It Takes All Night Long (Part I)"	"It Takes All Night Long (Part II)"	25	—	—	—	—	19	28	—	—	—	
1977	"A Little Boogie Woogie in the Back of My Mind"	"The Treat of 42nd Street"	31	—	—	—	—	—	—	—	—	—	
1977	"I Dare You to Lay One on Me"	"Hooked on Hollywood"	—	—	—	—	—	—	—	—	—	—	
1978	"Oh What a Fool I've Been"	"365 Days (Hurry on Home)"	—	—	—	—	—	—	—	—	—	—	
1979	"Superhero"	"Sleeping Beauty"	—	—	—	—	—	—	—	—	—	—	

=== 1980s ===
Year	A-side	B-side	Peak chart positions			Certifications
Year	A-side	B-side	UK	AUS	IRE	Certifications
1980	"I'm the Leader of the Gang" (EP)	"Rock and Roll"	57	—	—	
1980	"What Your Mama Don't See (Your Mama Don't Know)"	"I'm Not Just a Pretty Face"	UK/indie 23	—	—	
1981	"All That Glitters"	"Reach for the Sky"	48	—	—	
1981	"When I'm On, I'm On"	"Wild Horses"	76	—	—	
1981	"And Then She Kissed Me"	"I Love How You Love Me"	39	—	—	
1982	"Be My Baby"	"Is This What Dreams Are Made For?"	—	—	—	
1982	"Suspicious Minds"	"Ball of Confusion" (by Tina Turner)	—	—	—	
1984	"Dance Me Up"	"Too Young to Dance"	25	—	25	
1984	"Shout, Shout, Shout"	"Hair of the Dog"	108	—	—	
1984	"Another Rock and Roll Christmas"	"Another Rock and Roll Christmas" (Instrumental Remix)	7	—	14	BPI: Silver
1985	"Love Comes"	"Boys Will Be Boys"	91	—	—	
1985	"Rock 'n' Roll" (Live Rock 'n' Roll)	"Oh No" "I'm Not Just a Pretty Face"	UK/indie 31	—	—	
1986	"I'm the Leader of the Gang (I Am)" (with Girlschool)	"Never Too Late" (by Girlschool)	102	—	—	
1987	"Rock and Roll (Part 3)"	"Rock and Roll (Part 4)" (Instrumental)	107	—	—	
1987	"Rock and Roll (Part 5)"	"Rock and Roll (Part 3)" "Rock and Roll (Part 6)" (Instrumental)	—	—	—	
1988	"Frontiers of Style"	"The Only Way To Survive"	160	—	—	
1988	"Doctorin' the Tardis" (The Timelords featuring Gary Glitter)	"Doctorin' the Tardis (Minimal / Instrumental)"	1	2	4	

=== 1990s ===
Year	A-side	B-side	Peak chart positions	
Year	A-side	B-side	UK	SCO
1990	"Red Hot (Reputation)"	"Beats Being by Yourself"	87	—
1991	"Ready to Rock"	"The Only Way to Survive"	—	—
1992	"Through the Years"	"Another Rock and Roll Christmas"	49	—
1992	"And the Leader Rocks On" (Megamix/Medley 12" Version)	"Let's Go Party" "And the Leader Rocks On" (Megamix/Medley 7" Version)	58	—
1995	"Hello, Hello, I'm Back Again (Again!)" (Extended Re-Mix) by Public Demand	"Hello, Hello, I'm Back Again (Again!)" (Single Mix)	50	—
1995	"Hello, Hello, I'm Back Again (Again!)" "Do You Wanna Touch Me (Oh Yeah)" ('95) "I'm The Leader of the Gang (I Am!)" ('95) "Lover Man"		—	50
1996	"House of the Rising Sun"	"Rock Hard Men (Need The Power) - 1996 mix" "Rock and Roll Part 2"	77	78

=== 2000s ===
Year	Title	Notes
2001	"You"	mail order only (recorded 1996–97, included on the On studio album)
2004	"Control"	mail order only (recorded 1996–97, outtakes from the Lost on Life Street sessions)
2005	"Field of Dreams"	mail order only (recorded 1996–97, outtakes from the Lost on Life Street sessions)

=== 2010s ===
Year	A-side	B-side	Peak chart positions		
Year	A-side	B-side	UK Down.	US Rock	SCO
2019	"Rock and Roll Part 2"	"Rock and Roll Part 1"	51	16	42

== Covers/samples ==
- 1974 "I'm the Leader of the Gang (I Am)" by Brownsville Station – No. 48 US
- 1980 Holiday '80 EP by the Human League (includes cover of "Rock and Roll" as part of a medley with Iggy Pop's "Nightclubbing")
- 1980 "Doing Alright with the Boys" by Joan Jett
- 1980 "Do You Wanna Touch Me" by Joan Jett & the Blackhearts – No. 20 US
- 1982 "Rock and Roll Part 2" covered by hardcore punk band D.I.
- 1983 "I Didn't Know I Loved You (Till I Saw You Rock and Roll)" by Rock Goddess – No. 57 UK
- 1983 "I Didn't Know I Loved You (Till I Saw You Rock and Roll)" by Planet Patrol – R&B/Hip-Hop Singles Chart No. 62 US
- 1984 "I Love You Love Me Love" by Joan Jett & the Blackhearts – No. 105 US
- 1987 "A Little Boogie Woogie (In the Back of My Mind)" Shakin' Stevens – No. 12 UK
- 1988 "KLF – Doctorin' the Tardis" by The Timelords featuring Gary Glitter – No. 1 UK (features samples of "Rock and Roll (Parts 1 and 2)")
- 1989 "Let's Party" Jive Bunny and the Mastermixers – UK No. 1 (features a sample of Glitter's "Another Rock and Roll Christmas")
- 1989 "Rock and Roll" by the Undertones, cover of "Rock and' Roll (Part 1)", The Peel Sessions Album (Undertones)
- 1993 "I'm the Leader of the Gang (I Am)" Green Jellÿ featuring Hulk Hogan – No. 25 UK
- 1995 "Hello" by Oasis (uses elements of and quotes the chorus of "Hello, Hello, I'm Back Again")
- 2021 "Boris Johnson Is Still a Fucking Cunt" by The Kunts samples "Rock And Roll (Part 2)" for its instrumental – No. 5 UK
