= The Ultimate Gary Glitter – 25 Years of Hits =

Greatest hits album by Gary Glitter
- Released: 24 November 1997
- Genres: Glam rock; rock and roll; pop rock; hard rock; disco
- Length: 1:48:38
- Label: Snapper Music

Gary Glitter chronology
Leader II (1991)	The Ultimate Gary Glitter – 25 Years of Hits (1997)	On (2001)

Professional ratings
Review scores
Source	Rating
AllMusic	4.5/5 stars

The Ultimate Gary Glitter – 25 Years of Hits is a greatest hits album by the English glam rock singer Gary Glitter. It was originally released in the United Kingdom on 24 November 1997 on the label Snapper Music, less than a week after his arrest for having child pornography on his computer.

This is the only compilation album that Gary Glitter ever released, this is because he would be convicted for possession of child pornography in 1999.

The two-disc set contains 32 tracks in total, 16 tracks on each disc. 27 of the tracks are Gary Glitter songs spanning from 1972 through to 1984, while four of the tracks are singles from 1974–1975 by his backing band, The Glitter Band, without him. The one other track on the set is a song called "Rock Hard Men (Need The Power)", which was recorded in April 1997 from a then upcoming 1998 Gary Glitter album called Lost on Life Street. This 1997 version of "Rock Hard Men (Need The Power)" is a different mix of the song to the 1996 version that appeared as a B-side on Gary Glitter's "House of the Rising Sun" single.

The intended Lost on Life Street album was later cancelled due to the fallout from Gary Glitter's arrest on 19 November 1997 outside PC World in Bristol, and his later conviction in November 1999 for possession of child pornography. Most of the Lost on Life Street songs later had a limited release as On in 2001, which featured an extended Part 1 and Part 2 version of "Rock Hard Men".

The Ultimate Gary Glitter – 25 Years of Hits was reissued and repromoted by Snapper Music in both 2000 and 2002, with no alterations. The album does not contain any song material released under any of his aliases.

== Critical reception ==
Steve Huey of AllMusic gave the album four and a half out of five stars and wrote that "the two-disc, 32-track anthology The Ultimate (Best Of) is perhaps the largest Gary Glitter package it would be reasonable to assemble" adding that "for the casual fan, two discs of Glitter may be slightly wearing, but for the hardcore fan who has to have all of Glitter's best moments and doesn't mind a little inconsistency, Ultimate is a purchase that's hard to argue with."

== Track listing ==
All tracks are written by Gary Glitter and Mike Leander, except where noted.

Disc one
No.	Title	Writer(s)	Artist	Length
1.	"Rock and Roll (Part 1)"			3:00
2.	"Do You Wanna Touch Me (Oh Yeah)"			3:18
3.	"I'm the Leader of the Gang (I Am)"			3:29
4.	"I Didn't Know I Loved You (Till I Saw You Rock and Roll)"			3:21
5.	"I Love You Love Me Love"			3:13
6.	"Let's Get Together Again"	John Rossall; Gerry Sheppard	The Glitter Band	3:58
7.	"Doing Alright with the Boys"			3:14
8.	"Always Yours"			3:25
9.	"Sidewalk Sinner"			2:50
10.	"Angel Face"	Rossall; Sheppard	The Glitter Band	2:58
11.	"Oh Yes! You're Beautiful"			3:53
12.	"Love Like You and Me"	Gary Glitter; Mike Leander; Sheppard		3:17
13.	"Remember Me This Way"			4:20
14.	"You Belong to Me"			3:29
15.	"When I'm On I'm On"			4:02
16.	"Rock Hard Men (Need The Power)^{a}"	Glitter · Martin Jenkins		3:43

Disc two
No.	Title	Writer(s)	Artist	Length
1.	"Hello Hello I'm Back Again"			3:21
2.	"Rock and Roll (Part 2)"			3:00
3.	"Papa Oom Mow Mow"	Carl White; Al Frazier; Sonny Harris; Turner Wilson Jr.		3:47
4.	"Dance Me Up"	Glitter; Leander; Edward Seago		3:31
5.	"Rock On"			3:36
6.	"It Takes All Night Long"	Glitter; Leander; Seago		3:05
7.	"Goodbye My Love"	Sheppard; John Springate	The Glitter Band	3:50
8.	"Oh What a Fool I've Been"	Glitter; Leander; Seago		2:34
9.	"What Your Mama Don't See (Your Mama Don't Know)"			3:17
10.	"A Little Boogie Woogie in the Back of My Mind"	Glitter; Leander; Seago		3:04
11.	"I Dare You to Lay One on Me"	Glitter; Leander; Seago		2:29
12.	"Just for You"	Rossall; Sheppard	The Glitter Band	3:07
13.	"Be My Baby"	Jeff Barry; Ellie Greenwich; Phil Spector		3:11
14.	"And Then She Kissed Me"	Barry; Greenwich; Spector		3:25
15.	"All That Glitters (Medley)"			4:03
16.	"Another Rock and Roll Christmas"	Glitter; Leander; Seago		3:48
Total length:				1:48:38

Note

- ^a This is the 1997 mix of "Rock Hard Men (Need The Power)", which differs from the 1996 mix that appeared as a B side on Glitter's House of the Rising Sun single.

=== 2011 digital edition ===
No.	Title	Length
1.	"Rock and Roll (Part 1)"
2.	"Rock and Roll (Part 2)"
3.	"I Didn't Know I Loved You (Till I Saw You Rock and Roll)"
4.	"Do You Wanna Touch Me (Oh Yeah)"
5.	"Hello Hello I'm Back Again"
6.	"I'm the Leader of the Gang (I Am)"
7.	"I Love You Love Me Love"
8.	"Remember Me This Way"
9.	"Always Yours"
10.	"Oh Yes! You're Beautiful"
11.	"Love Like You and Me"
12.	"Doing Alright with the Boys"
13.	"Papa Oom Mow Mow"
14.	"You Belong to Me"
15.	"It Takes All Night Long"
16.	"A Little Boogie Woogie in the Back of My Mind"
17.	"And Then She Kissed Me"
18.	"All That Glitters (Medley)"
19.	"Dance Me Up"
20.	"Another Rock and Roll Christmas"
