= List of UK top-ten singles in 1975 =

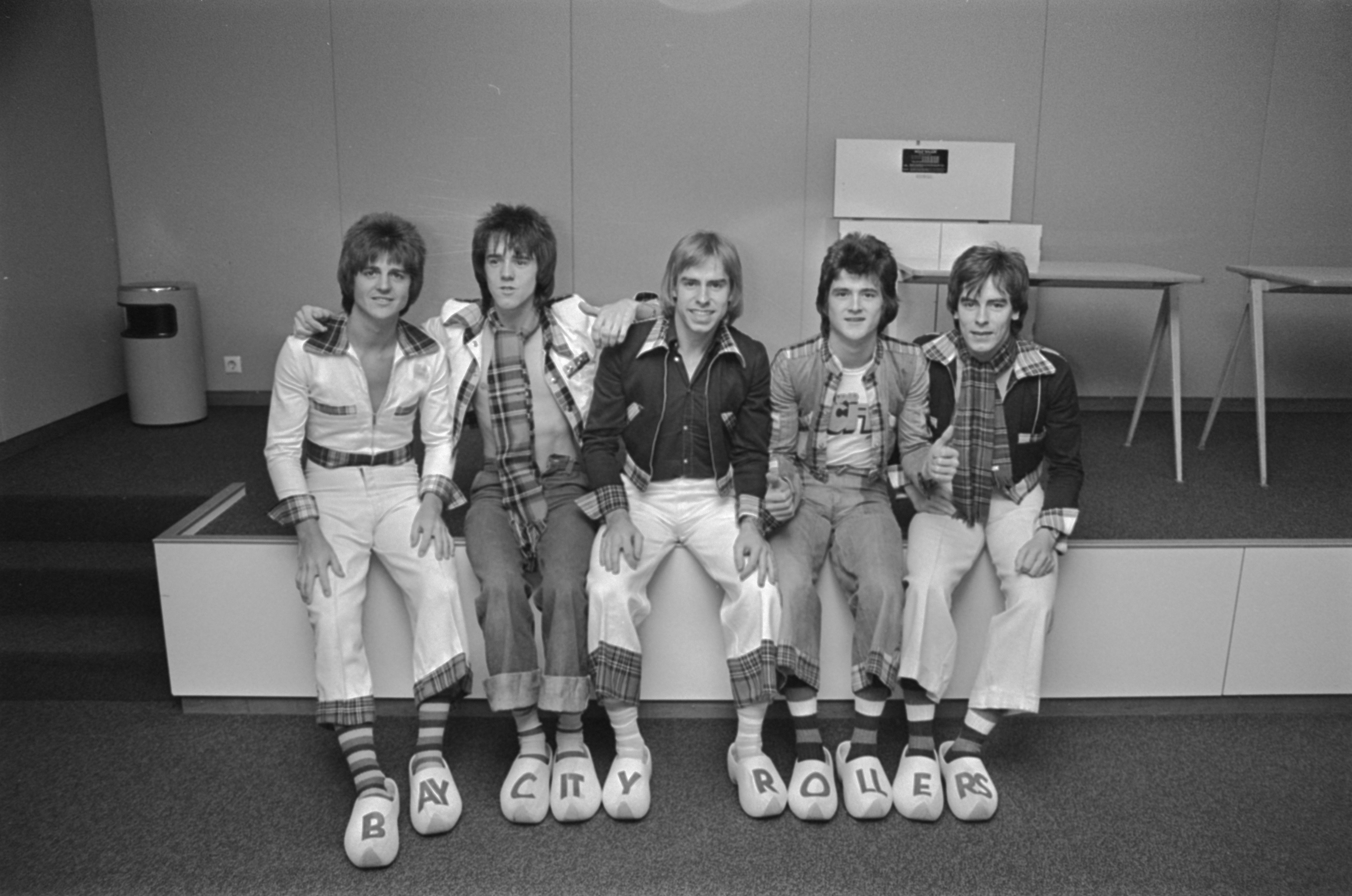
The Bay City Rollers had the biggest selling single of the year, "Bye Bye Baby", which spent six weeks at number-one. The Scottish group had two further top 10 hits this year, including "Give a Little Love", which spent three weeks at number-one.

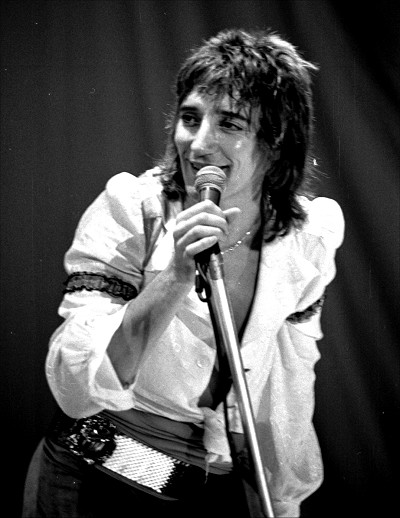
Rod Stewart's "Sailing" was the second most popular song of this year, spending four weeks at number-one and was one of two top 10 entries for Stewart this year. "Sailing" re-entered the UK top 10 the following year after it was used as the theme song for Sailor, a BBC1 documentary series on HMS Ark Royal.

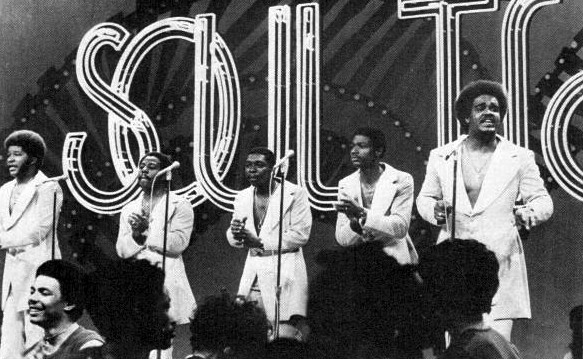
"Can't Give You Anything (But My Love)" by American soul group The Stylistics spent three weeks at number-one in August 1975 and was the third best-seller of the year. The group achieved a total of three top 10 singles this year.

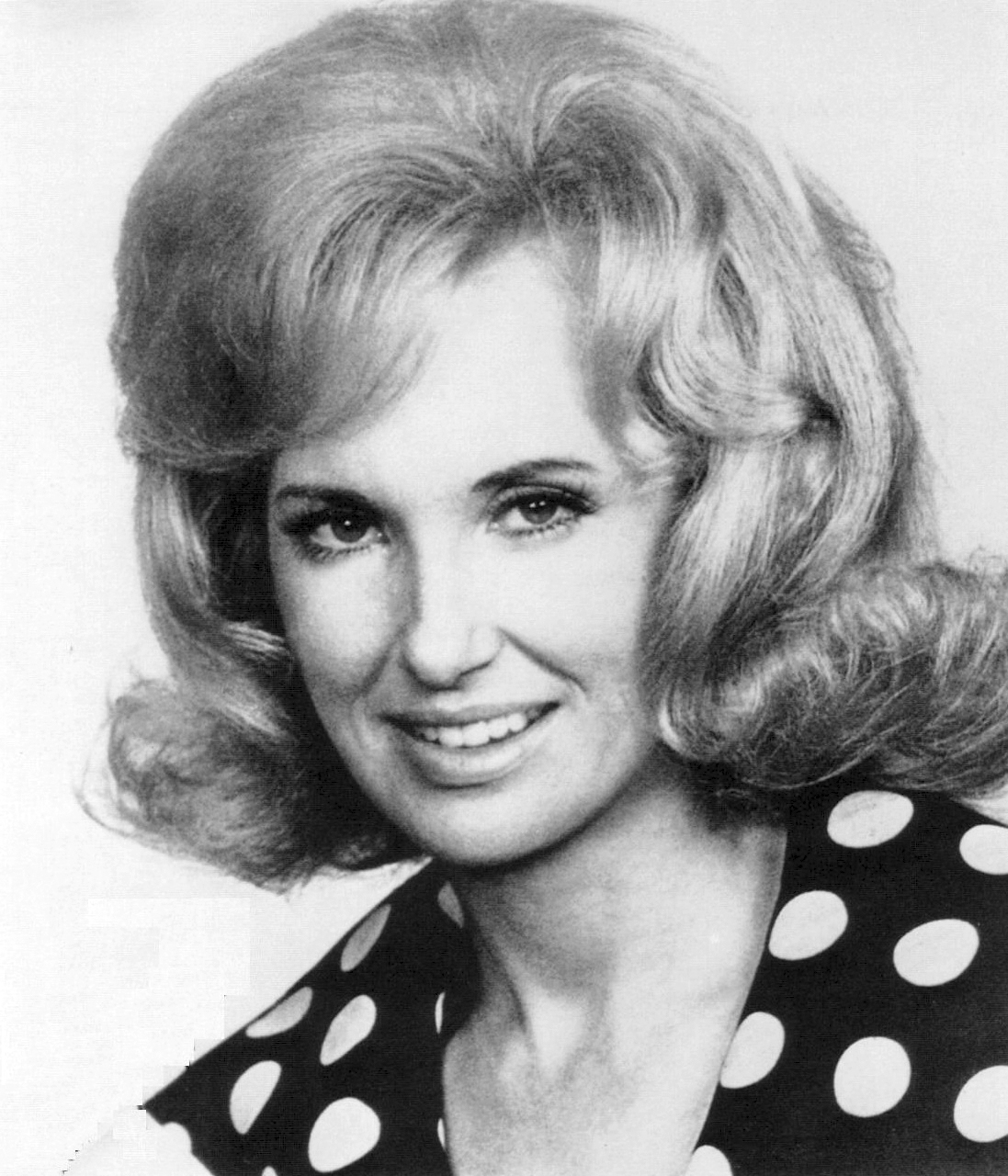
Tammy Wynette reached number-one in the UK in May of this year with "Stand by Your Man", which became the fifth best selling single of the year. When the song was originally released in the US in 1968, it reached the top of the country charts and became a top 20 hit on the Billboard Hot 100.

The UK Singles Chart is one of many music charts compiled by the Official Charts Company that calculates the best-selling singles of the week in the United Kingdom. Before 2004, the chart was only based on the sales of physical singles. This list shows singles that peaked in the Top 10 of the UK Singles Chart during 1975, as well as singles which peaked in 1974 but were in the top 10 in 1975. The entry date is when the single appeared in the top 10 for the first time (week ending, as published by the Official Charts Company, which is six days after the chart is announced).

One-hundred and forty-seven singles were in the top ten in 1975. Nine singles from 1974 remained in the top 10 for several weeks at the beginning of the year. "My Boy" by Elvis Presley, "Streets of London" by Ralph McTell and "Wombling Merry Christmas" by The Wombles were the singles from 1974 to reach their peak in 1975. Twenty-six artists scored multiple entries in the top 10 in 1975. Demis Roussos, Gladys Knight & The Pips, Gloria Gaynor, Guys 'n' Dolls and Tammy Wynette were among the many artists who achieved their first UK charting top 10 single in 1975.

The 1974 Christmas number-one, "Lonely This Christmas" by Mud, remained at number-one for the first two weeks of 1975. The first new number-one single of the year was "Down Down" by Status Quo. Overall, twenty-one different singles peaked at number-one in 1975, with The Bay City Rollers (2) having the most singles hit that position.

== Background ==
=== Multiple entries ===
One-hundred and forty-seven singles charted in the top 10 in 1975, with one-hundred and forty-one singles reaching their peak that year. "Paloma Blanca" was recorded by Jonathan King (as "Una Paloma Blanca (White Dove)") and George Baker Selection and both versions reached the top 10.

Twenty-six artists scored multiple entries in the top 10 in 1975. Rock band Mud secured the record for most top 10 hits, with six singles. This included two number-one singles: their Christmas number-one from 1974, "Lonely This Christmas" spent two additional weeks at the top of the chart in early January, while "Oh Boy!" scaled the chart in April. Their other song that reached the top five was "The Secrets That You Keep" in February. Of their three final entries, "Show Me You're a Woman" peaked highest at number eight in December; earlier in the year, "Moonshine Sally" (July) and "L-L-Lucy" (October) both sneaked into the top 10 at number ten.

Six artists shared the accolade for second most top ten entries this year. This included three British performers and three musical acts from the United States. The Bay City Rollers spent a total of nineteen weeks in the top 10 in 1975 with their three singles, with two of their singles reaching number-one. "Bye Bye Baby" was the most successful of these, becoming the biggest selling single of the year in the UK and topped the chart for six weeks. "Give a Little Love" also reached the summit in July. Their haul was completed by November's number three smash "Money Honey".

Frankie Valli of The Four Season numbered one solo single and two singles with the group among his three top 10 hits. "My Eyes Adored You" (initially intended as a single for the band) landed him a solo top five spot, while "The Night" peaked at number seven and "Who Loves You" went in one place higher. Soul group The Stylistics were the final act originating from America to make the top 10 on three occasions in 1975. "Sing Baby Sing" began their run in May, "Can't Give You Anything (But My Love)" topped the chart in August and was the third best-selling single of the year, and "Na Na Is the Saddest Word" made number five just before Christmas.

British singer David Essex had three top 10 hits, the best performing "Hold Me Close" going to number-one in September. "Stardust" had peaked at number seven at the start of the year and "Rolling Stone" was a top five entry in July. Glam rock band Kenny matched this feat with three singles nestling inside the top 10. "The Bump" made number three in January, "Fancy Pants" was at number four in March and "Julie Anne" rounded it off at number ten in September. The final singer to meet the three single total was Englishman Gary Glitter, which included "Oh Yes! You're Beautiful" from the tail-end of 1974 at number two. "Doing Alright with the Boys" rose to number six in June and "Love Like You and Me" reached number ten a few months earlier.

David Bowie was one of a number of artists with two top-ten entries, including the number-one single "Space Oddity". Barry White, Elvis Presley, Hot Chocolate, Rod Stewart and Status Quo were among the other artists who had multiple top 10 entries in 1975.

=== Chart debuts ===
Fifty-eight artists achieved their first top 10 single in 1975, either as a lead or featured artist. Of these, five went on to record another hit single that year: Gladys Knight & The Pips, The Goodies, Mac and Katie Kissoon, Moments and Smokie. Kenny had two other entries in their breakthrough year.

The following table (collapsed on desktop site) does not include acts who had previously charted as part of a group and secured their first top 10 solo single.

Artist	Number of top 10s	First entry	Chart position	Other entries
The Goodies	2	"The Inbetweenies"/"Father Christmas Do Not Touch Me"	7	"The Funky Gibbon"/"Sick Man Blues"
Kenny	3	"The Bump"	3	"Fancy Pants" (4), "Julie Ann" (10)
Gloria Gaynor	1	"Never Can Say Goodbye"	2	—
The Tymes	1	"Ms Grace"	1	—
Billy Swan	1	"I Can Help"	6	—
John Holt	1	"Help Me Make It Through the Night"	6	—
Pilot	1	"January"	1	—
Mac and Katie Kissoon	2	"Sugar Candy Kisses"	3	"Don't Do It Baby" (9)
Helen Reddy	1	"Angie Baby"	5	—
Johnny Wakelin and the Kinshasa Band	1	"Black Superman (Muhammad Ali)"	7	—
Wigan's Chosen Few	1	"Footsee"	9	—
Shirley & Company	1	"Shame, Shame, Shame"	6	—
Telly Savalas	1	"If"	1	—
Fox	1	"Only You Can"	3	—
Average White Band	1	"Pick Up the Pieces"	6	—
Guys 'n' Dolls	1	"There's a Whole Lot of Loving"	2	—
Moments	2	"Girls"	3	"Dolly My Love" (10)
Whatnauts	1	"Girls"	3	—
Jim Gilstrap	1	"Swing Your Daddy"	4	—
Mike Reid	1	"The Ugly Duckling"	10	—
Minnie Riperton	1	"Lovin' You"	2	—
Susan Cadogan	1	"Hurt So Good"	4	—
Tammy Wynette	1	"Stand by Your Man"	1	—
Tammy Jones	1	"Let Me Try Again"	5	—
Gilbert Bécaud	1	"A Little Love and Understanding"	10	—
Windsor Davies	1	"Whispering Grass"	1	—
Don Estelle	1	"Whispering Grass"	1	—
Gladys Knight & the Pips	2	"The Way We Were"/"Try to Remember"	4	"Best Thing That Ever Happened to Me" (7)
Van McCoy	1	"The Hustle"	3	—
Hamilton Bohannon	1	"Disco Stomp"	6	—
Pete Wingfield	1	"Eighteen with a Bullet"	7	—
Typically Tropical	1	"Barbados"	1	—
Smokie	2	"If You Think You Know How to Love Me"	3	"Don't Play Your Rock 'n' Roll to Me" (8)
Linda Lewis	1	"It's in His Kiss"	6	—
The Sensational Alex Harvey Band	1	"Delilah"	7	—
Adrian Baker	1	"Sherry"	10	—
Billie Jo Spears	1	"Blanket on the Ground"	6	—
Jasper Carrott	1	"Funky Moped"/"Magic Roundabout"	5	—
5000 Volts	1	"I'm on Fire"	4	—
Carl Malcolm	1	"Fattie Bum-Bum"	8	—
George Baker Selection	1	"Paloma Blanca"	10	—
Morris Albert	1	"Feelings"	4	—
The Band of the Black Watch	1	"Scotch on the Rocks"	8	—
Esther Phillips	1	"What a Diff'rence a Day Makes"	6	—
The Trammps	1	"Hold Back the Night"	5	—
Billy Connolly	1	"D.I.V.O.R.C.E."	1	—
Justin Hayward	1	"Blue Guitar"	8	—
John Lodge	1	"Blue Guitar"	8	—
Jim Capaldi	1	"Love Hurts"	4	—
Jigsaw	1	"Sky High"	9	—
Maxine Nightingale	1	"Right Back Where We Started From"	8	—
Steeleye Span	1	"All Around My Hat"	5	—
Laurel and Hardy	1	"The Trail of the Lonesome Pine"	2	—
The Avalon Boys	1	"The Trail of the Lonesome Pine"	2	—
Chill Wills	1	"The Trail of the Lonesome Pine"	2	—
Greg Lake	1	"I Believe in Father Christmas"	2	—
Demis Roussos	1	"Happy to Be on an Island in the Sun"	5	—
Chris Hill	1	"Renta Santa"	10	—

Notes

Frankie Valli had been a part of the group The Four Seasons since 1962, when they had taken their debut single "Sherry" to number eight . He recorded "My Eyes Adored You" - originally intended as a Four Seasons release - on his own, peaking at number five in March 1975.

Mike Batt performed as a vocalist (as well as producer) with The Wombles, who debuted in 1974 with four hit singles including Christmas song "Wombling Merry Christmas". He had a solo top 10 single with "Summertime City" in 1975. Art Garfunkel appeared in the chart for the first time in 1975 without his singing partner Paul Simon, topping the chart with "I Only Have Eyes for You". John Lennon was a highly successful musician in the line-up of The Beatles, as well as with his wife Yoko Ono and the Plastic Ono Band prior to 1975, when he released his top 10 debut single "Imagine", which peaked at number six that year, and later reached number-one following his assassination in December 1980.

=== Songs from films ===
The only modern song from a film to enter the top 10 in 1975 was "Sky High" (from The Man from Hong Kong). 'The Trail of The Lonesome Pine' by Laurel and Hardy was from the 1937 film 'Way Out west'.

=== Best-selling singles ===
The Bay City Rollers had the best-selling single of the year with "Bye Bye Baby". The single spent ten weeks in the top 10 (including six weeks at number one) and was certified gold by the BPI. "Sailing" by Rod Stewart came in second place. The Stylistics' "Can't Give You Anything (But My Love)", "Whispering Grass" from Windsor Davies and Don Estelle and "Stand by Your Man" by Tammy Wynette made up the top five. Singles by The Bay City Rollers ("Give a Little Love"), David Essex, Roger Whittaker, Art Garfunkel and Johnny Nash were also in the top ten best-selling singles of the year.

== Top-ten singles ==
Key

Symbol	Meaning
‡	Single peaked in 1974 but still in chart in 1975.
(#)	Year-end top-ten single position and rank
Entered	The date that the single first appeared in the chart.
Peak	Highest position that the single reached in the UK Singles Chart.

Entered (week ending)	Weeks in top 10	Single	Artist	Peak	Peak reached (week ending)	Weeks at peak
Singles in 1974
16 November 1974	8	"You're the First, the Last, My Everything" ‡	Barry White	1	7 December 1974	2
23 November 1974	8	"Juke Box Jive" ‡	The Rubettes	3	7 December 1974	4
30 November 1974	6	"Oh Yes! You're Beautiful" ‡	Gary Glitter	2	14 December 1974	1
30 November 1974	6	"You Ain't Seen Nothing Yet" ‡	Bachman-Turner Overdrive	2	21 December 1974	2
7 December 1974	5	"My Boy"	Elvis Presley	5	4 January 1975	1
14 December 1974	6	"Lonely This Christmas" ‡	Mud	1	21 December 1974	4
21 December 1974	4	"Wombling Merry Christmas"	The Wombles	2	4 January 1975	1
21 December 1974	6	"Streets of London"	Ralph McTell	2	11 January 1975	2
21 December 1974	4	"Get Dancin'" ‡ ^{[A]}	Disco-Tex and the Sex-O-Lettes	8	21 December 1974	3
Singles in 1975
4 January 1975	1	"The Inbetweenies"/"Father Christmas Do Not Touch Me"	The Goodies	7	4 January 1975	1
4 January 1975	5	"Down Down"	Status Quo	1	18 January 1975	1
11 January 1975	6	"The Bump"	Kenny	3	18 January 1975	3
11 January 1975	5	"Never Can Say Goodbye"	Gloria Gaynor	2	25 January 1975	1
11 January 1975	5	"Ms Grace"	The Tymes	1	25 January 1975	1
11 January 1975	2	"I Can Help"	Billy Swan	6	18 January 1975	1
18 January 1975	2	"Stardust"	David Essex	7	18 January 1975	1
18 January 1975	2	"Are You Ready to Rock"	Wizzard	8	25 January 1975	1
25 January 1975	3	"Help Me Make It Through the Night"	John Holt	6	25 January 1975	1
25 January 1975	4	"Morning Side of the Mountain"	Donny & Marie Osmond	5	1 February 1975	1
25 January 1975	6	"January"	Pilot	1	1 February 1975	3
1 February 1975	4	"Goodbye My Love"	The Glitter Band	2	8 February 1975	1
1 February 1975	2	"Promised Land"	Elvis Presley	9	1 February 1975	1
1 February 1975	5	"Sugar Candy Kisses"	Mac and Katie Kissoon	3	8 February 1975	2
8 February 1975	5	"Please Mr. Postman"	The Carpenters	2	15 February 1975	1
15 February 1975	2	"Angie Baby"	Helen Reddy	5	15 February 1975	1
15 February 1975	2	"Black Superman (Muhammad Ali)"	Johnny Wakelin & the Kinshasa Band	7	15 February 1975	1
15 February 1975	5	"Make Me Smile (Come Up and See Me)"	Steve Harley & Cockney Rebel	1	22 February 1975	2
15 February 1975	4	"Footsee"	Wigan's Chosen Few	9	22 February 1975	1
22 February 1975	5	"The Secrets That You Keep"	Mud	3	8 March 1975	1
22 February 1975	3	"Shame, Shame, Shame"	Shirley & Company	6	1 March 1975	1
1 March 1975	5	"If"	Telly Savalas	1	8 March 1975	2
1 March 1975	5	"Only You Can"	Fox	3	22 March 1975	1
1 March 1975	3	"My Eyes Adored You" ^{[B]}	Frankie Valli	5	8 March 1975	1
8 March 1975	10	"Bye Bye Baby" (#1)	Bay City Rollers	1	22 March 1975	6
8 March 1975	3	"Pick Up the Pieces"	Average White Band	6	22 March 1975	1
15 March 1975	1	"Please Tell Him That I Said Hello"	Dana	8	15 March 1975	1
15 March 1975	6	"There's a Whole Lot of Loving"	Guys 'n' Dolls	2	29 March 1975	2
15 March 1975	1	"I'm Stone in Love with You"	Johnny Mathis	10	15 March 1975	1
22 March 1975	3	"What Am I Gonna Do with You"	Barry White	5	22 March 1975	2
22 March 1975	5	"Fancy Pants"	Kenny	4	5 April 1975	1
22 March 1975	4	"Girls"	Moments & Whatnauts	3	29 March 1975	2
22 March 1975	4	"I Can Do It"	The Rubettes	7	5 April 1975	1
29 March 1975	6	"Fox on the Run"	Sweet	2	12 April 1975	2
29 March 1975	5	"The Funky Gibbon"/"Sick Man Blues"	The Goodies	4	12 April 1975	1
5 April 1975	4	"Swing Your Daddy"	Jim Gilstrap	4	19 April 1975	1
5 April 1975	1	"Play Me Like You Play Your Guitar"	Duane Eddy & the Rebelettes ^{[C]}	9	5 April 1975	1
12 April 1975	4	"Love Me Love My Dog"	Peter Shelley	3	19 April 1975	1
19 April 1975	5	"Honey" ^{[D]}	Bobby Goldsboro	2	26 April 1975	1
19 April 1975	1	"The Ugly Duckling"	Mike Reid	10	19 April 1975	1
26 April 1975	5	"Oh Boy!"	Mud	1	3 May 1975	2
26 April 1975	5	"Lovin' You"	Minnie Riperton	2	3 May 1975	2
26 April 1975	2	"Life Is a Minestrone"	10cc	7	3 May 1975	1
26 April 1975	5	"Hurt So Good"	Susan Cadogan	4	3 May 1975	3
3 May 1975	1	"The Tears I Cried"	The Glitter Band	8	3 May 1975	1
3 May 1975	2	"Take Good Care of Yourself"	The Three Degrees	9	3 May 1975	2
10 May 1975	7	"Stand by Your Man" (#5)	Tammy Wynette	1	17 May 1975	3
10 May 1975	4	"Let Me Try Again"	Tammy Jones	5	17 May 1975	1
10 May 1975	2	"The Night" ^{[E]}	Frankie Valli & The Four Seasons	7	10 May 1975	1
10 May 1975	1	"A Little Love and Understanding"	Gilbert Bécaud	10	10 May 1975	1
17 May 1975	2	"I Wanna Dance Wit' Choo (Doo Dat Dance)" ^{[F]}	Disco-Tex and the Sex-O-Lettes	6	17 May 1975	1
17 May 1975	2	"Only Yesterday"	The Carpenters	7	17 May 1975	1
17 May 1975	1	"Love Like You and Me"	Gary Glitter	10	17 May 1975	1
24 May 1975	8	"Whispering Grass" (#4)	Windsor Davies & Don Estelle	1	7 June 1975	3
24 May 1975	5	"The Way We Were"/"Try to Remember"	Gladys Knight & the Pips	4	31 May 1975	1
24 May 1975	5	"Sing Baby Sing"	The Stylistics	3	31 May 1975	1
24 May 1975	1	"Don't Do It Baby"	Mac and Katie Kissoon	9	24 May 1975	1
31 May 1975	6	"Three Steps to Heaven"	Showaddywaddy	2	14 June 1975	1
31 May 1975	3	"Send in the Clowns"	Judy Collins	6	31 May 1975	1
31 May 1975	1	"Thanks for the Memory (Wham Bam Thank You Mam)"	Slade	7	31 May 1975	1
31 May 1975	2	"Roll Over Lay Down"	Status Quo	9	7 June 1975	1
7 June 1975	4	"The Proud One"	The Osmonds	5	21 June 1975	1
7 June 1975	7	"I'm Not in Love"	10cc	1	28 June 1975	2
7 June 1975	1	"Israelites" ^{[G]}	Desmond Dekker & The Aces	10	7 June 1975	1
14 June 1975	8	"The Hustle"	Van McCoy	3	5 July 1975	2
14 June 1975	3	"Listen to What the Man Said"	Wings	6	21 June 1975	1
21 June 1975	5	"Disco Stomp"	Hamilton Bohannon	6	5 July 1975	1
28 June 1975	7	"Tears on My Pillow" (#10)	Johnny Nash	1	12 July 1975	1
28 June 1975	3	"Doing Alright with the Boys"	Gary Glitter	6	28 June 1975	2
28 June 1975	6	"Misty"	Ray Stevens	2	12 July 1975	1
5 July 1975	4	"Have You Seen Her"/"Oh Girl" ^{[H]}	The Chi-Lites	5	12 July 1975	1
5 July 1975	1	"Moonshine Sally"	Mud	10	5 July 1975	1
12 July 1975	6	"Give a Little Love" (#6)	Bay City Rollers	1	19 July 1975	3
12 July 1975	3	"Eighteen With a Bullet"	Pete Wingfield	7	19 July 1975	1
19 July 1975	7	"Barbados"	Typically Tropical	1	9 August 1975	1
19 July 1975	4	"Je t'aime"	Judge Dread	9	26 July 1975	2
26 July 1975	1	"Rolling Stone"	David Essex	5	26 July 1975	1
26 July 1975	3	"Sealed With a Kiss" ^{[I]}	Brian Hyland	7	2 August 1975	2
2 August 1975	4	"Jive Talkin'"	Bee Gees	5	2 August 1975	2
2 August 1975	5	"If You Think You Know How to Love Me"	Smokie	3	16 August 1975	1
2 August 1975	3	"It's in His Kiss"	Linda Lewis	6	9 August 1975	1
9 August 1975	6	"Can't Give You Anything (But My Love)" (#3)	The Stylistics	1	16 August 1975	3
9 August 1975	2	"Delilah"	The Sensational Alex Harvey Band	7	16 August 1975	1
16 August 1975	7	"The Last Farewell" (#8)	Roger Whittaker	2	13 September 1975	1
16 August 1975	4	"It's Been So Long"	George McCrae	4	30 August 1975	1
16 August 1975	1	"Sherry"	Adrian Baker	10	16 August 1975	1
23 August 1975	7	"Sailing" (#2)	Rod Stewart	1	6 September 1975	4
23 August 1975	3	"Blanket on the Ground"	Billie Jo Spears	6	30 August 1975	1
23 August 1975	5	"That's the Way (I Like It)"	KC and the Sunshine Band	4	6 September 1975	1
23 August 1975	1	"Dolly My Love"	The Moments	10	23 August 1975	1
30 August 1975	3	"Best Thing That Ever Happened to Me"	Gladys Knight & the Pips	7	30 August 1975	1
30 August 1975	4	"Summertime City" ^{[J]}	Mike Batt with the New Edition	4	20 September 1975	1
6 September 1975	4	"A Child's Prayer"	Hot Chocolate	7	13 September 1975	1
6 September 1975	6	"Funky Moped"/"Magic Roundabout"	Jasper Carrott	5	20 September 1975	1
13 September 1975	4	"Moonlighting"	Leo Sayer	2	20 September 1975	1
13 September 1975	1	"Julie Anne"	Kenny	10	13 September 1975	1
20 September 1975	4	"I'm on Fire"	5000 Volts	4	27 September 1975	2
20 September 1975	3	"Heartbeat"	Showaddywaddy	7	20 September 1975	3
20 September 1975	7	"Hold Me Close" (#7)	David Essex	1	4 October 1975	3
27 September 1975	6	"There Goes My First Love"	The Drifters	3	4 October 1975	5
27 September 1975	7	"I Only Have Eyes for You" (#9)	Art Garfunkel	1	25 October 1975	2
4 October 1975	2	"Fattie Bum-Bum"	Carl Malcolm	8	11 October 1975	1
4 October 1975	3	"Una Paloma Blanca (White Dove)"	Jonathan King	5	11 October 1975	1
11 October 1975	3	"It's Time For Love"	The Chi-Lites	5	18 October 1975	1
11 October 1975	3	"Who Loves You" ^{[E]}	The Four Seasons	6	18 October 1975	1
11 October 1975	1	"Paloma Blanca"	George Baker Selection	10	11 October 1975	1
18 October 1975	4	"Feelings"	Morris Albert	4	18 October 1975	2
18 October 1975	4	"SOS"	ABBA	6	25 October 1975	2
18 October 1975	2	"Scotch on the Rocks"	The Band of the Black Watch	8	18 October 1975	1
18 October 1975	1	"L-L-Lucy"	Mud	10	18 October 1975	1
25 October 1975	6	"Space Oddity" ^{[K]}	David Bowie	1	8 November 1975	2
25 October 1975	2	"Don't Play Your Rock 'n' Roll to Me"	Smokie	8	25 October 1975	2
1 November 1975	4	"Love Is the Drug"	Roxy Music	2	8 November 1975	1
1 November 1975	2	"What a Diff'rence a Day Makes"	Esther Phillips	6	8 November 1975	1
1 November 1975	4	"Rhinestone Cowboy"	Glen Campbell	4	8 November 1975	2
8 November 1975	2	"Hold Back the Night"	The Trammps	5	8 November 1975	1
8 November 1975	5	"D.I.V.O.R.C.E."	Billy Connolly	1	22 November 1975	1
8 November 1975	2	"Blue Guitar"	Justin Hayward & John Lodge	8	15 November 1975	1
15 November 1975	4	"Love Hurts"	Jim Capaldi	4	29 November 1975	1
15 November 1975	5	"Imagine"	John Lennon	6	15 November 1975	3
15 November 1975	1	"New York Groove"	Hello	9	15 November 1975	1
15 November 1975	8	"You Sexy Thing"	Hot Chocolate	2	29 November 1975	3
22 November 1975	4	"This Old Heart of Mine"	Rod Stewart	4	6 December 1975	1
22 November 1975	12	"Bohemian Rhapsody"	Queen	1	29 November 1975	9
22 November 1975	2	"Sky High"	Jigsaw	9	29 November 1975	1
29 November 1975	3	"Money Honey"	Bay City Rollers	3	6 December 1975	1
29 November 1975	1	"Right Back Where We Started From"	Maxine Nightingale	8	29 November 1975	1
6 December 1975	3	"All Around My Hat"	Steeleye Span	5	6 December 1975	1
6 December 1975	5	"Na Na Is the Saddest Word"	The Stylistics	5	13 December 1975	1
6 December 1975	6	"The Trail of the Lonesome Pine"	Laurel and Hardy with The Avalon Boys featuring Chill Wills	2	20 December 1975	2
13 December 1975	2	"Show Me You're A Woman"	Mud	8	13 December 1975	1
13 December 1975	6	"Let's Twist Again"/"The Twist" ^{[L]}	Chubby Checker	5	27 December 1975	3
20 December 1975	4	"I Believe in Father Christmas"	Greg Lake	2	27 December 1975	2
20 December 1975	4	"Happy to Be on an Island in the Sun" ^{[M]}	Demis Roussos	5	20 December 1975	1
20 December 1975	4	"Golden Years"	David Bowie	8	20 December 1975	2
27 December 1975	3	"It's Gonna Be a Cold Cold Christmas"	Dana	4	27 December 1975	2
27 December 1975	2	"Renta Santa"	Chris Hill	10	27 December 1975	2

== Entries by artist ==
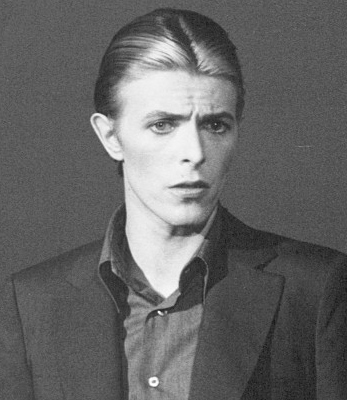
David Bowie had two top 10 singles in 1975, including the re-release of his first chart hit "Space Oddity", which gave him his first UK number-one single. "Space Oddity" had originally peaked at number five in the UK upon its initial release in 1969.

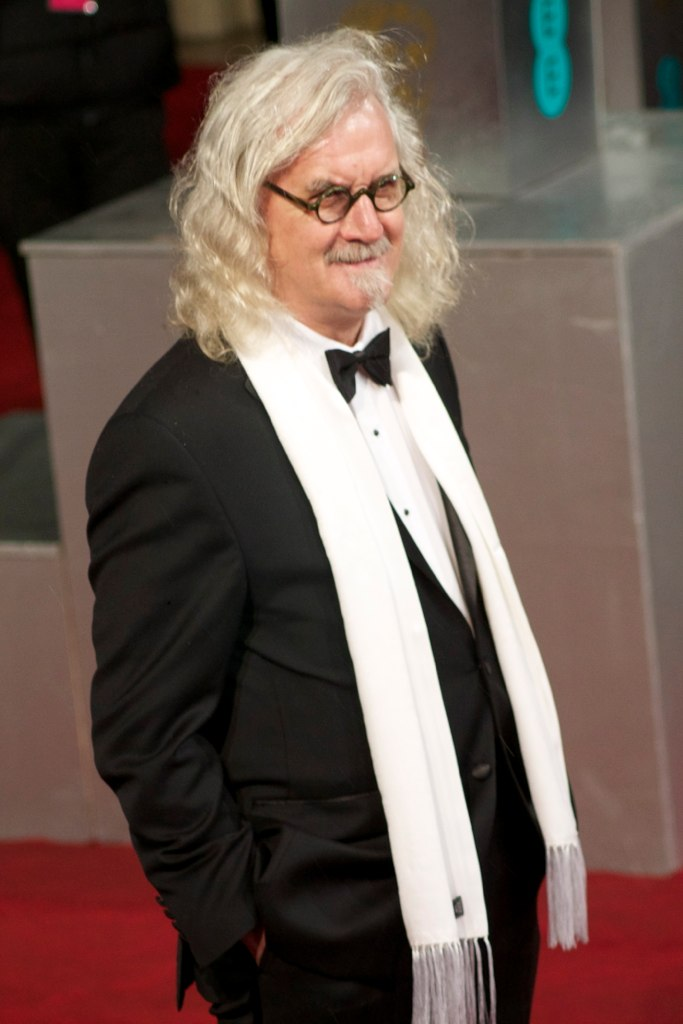
Billy Connolly (pictured in 2013) secured his only UK top 10 single in November of this year with "D.I.V.O.R.C.E.", a parody of the Tammy Wynette song "D-I-V-O-R-C-E", which spent one week at number-one.

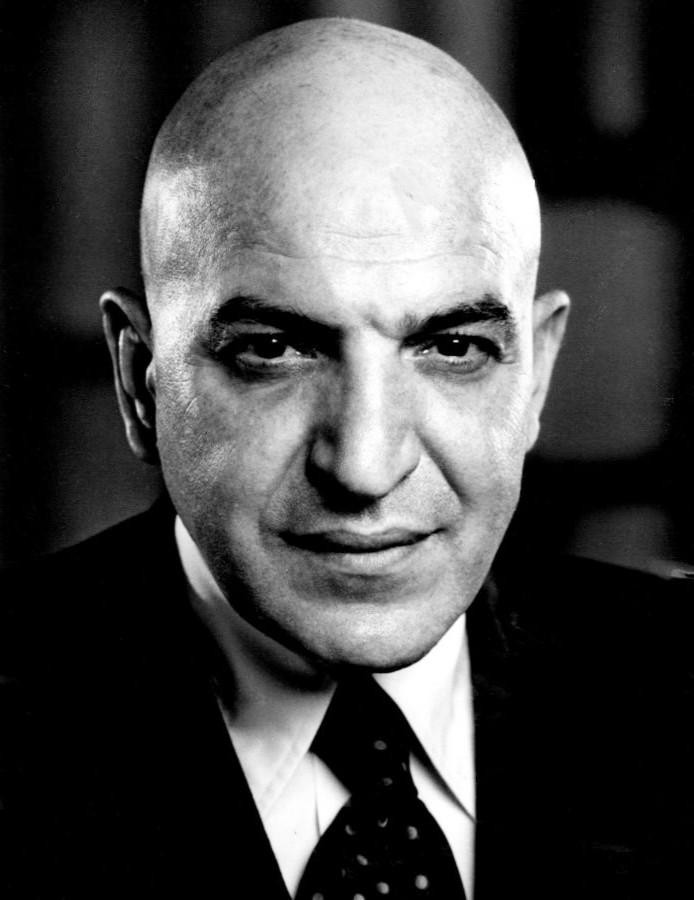
American actor and singer Telly Savalas reached number-one in the UK in March 1975 with his spoken word cover of Bread's "If".

The following table shows artists who achieved two or more top 10 entries in 1975, including singles that reached their peak in 1974. The figures include both main artists and featured artists, while appearances on ensemble charity records are also counted for each artist. The total number of weeks an artist spent in the top ten in 1975 is also shown.

Entries	Artist	Weeks	Singles
6	Mud ^{[N]}	17	"Lonely This Christmas", "L-L-Lucy", "Moonshine Sally", "Oh Boy!", "Show Me You're a Woman", "The Secrets That You Keep"
3	Bay City Rollers	19	"Bye Bye Baby", "Give a Little Love", "Money Honey"
3	David Essex	10	"Hold Me Close", "Rolling Stone", "Stardust"
3	Frankie Valli ^{[O]}	8	"My Eyes Adored You", "The Night", "Who Loves You"
3	Gary Glitter ^{[N]}	5	"Doing Alright with the Boys", "Love Like You and Me", "Oh Yes! You're Beautiful"
3	Kenny	12	"Fancy Pants", "Julie Anne", "The Bump"
3	The Stylistics	15	"Can't Give You Anything (But My Love)", "Na Na Is the Saddest Word", "Sing Baby Sing"
2	10cc	9	"I'm Not in Love", "Life Is a Minestrone"
2	Barry White ^{[N]}	4	"What Am I Gonna Do with You", "You're the First, the Last, My Everything"
2	The Carpenters	9	"Only Yesterday", "Please Mr. Postmam"
2	The Chi-Lites	7	"Have You Seen Her"/"Oh Girl", "It's Time for Love"
2	Dana	2	"It's Gonna Be a Cold Christmas", "Please Tell Him That I Said Hello"
2	David Bowie	8	"Golden Years", "Space Oddity"
2	Disco Tex and the Sex-O-Lettes ^{[N]}	4	"Get Dancin'", "I Wanna Dance Wit' Choo (Doo Dat Dance)"
2	Elvis Presley ^{[P]}	3	"My Boy", "Promised Land"
2	The Four Seasons	5	"The Night", "Who Loves You"
2	Gladys Knight & the Pips	8	"The Best Thing That Ever Happened to Me", "The Way We Were"/"Try to Remember"
2	The Glitter Band	5	"Goodbye My Love", "The Tears I Cried"
2	The Goodies	6	"The Funky Gibbon"/"Sick Man Blues", "The Inbetweenies"/"Father Christmas Do Not Touch Me"
2	Hot Chocolate	11	"A Child's Prayer", "You Sexy Thing"
2	Mike Batt ^{[Q]}	6	"Summertime City", "Wombling Merry Christmas"
2	The Moments	8	"Dolly My Love", "Girls"
2	Rod Stewart	11	"Sailing", "This Old Heart of Mine"
2	The Rubettes ^{[N]}	6	"I Can Do It", "Juke Box Jive"
2	Showaddywaddy	9	"Heartbeat", "Three Steps to Heaven"
2	Smokie	7	"Don't Play Your Rock 'n' Roll to Me", "If You Think You Know How to Love Me"
2	Status Quo	7	"Down Down, "Roll Over Lay Down"

== Notes ==
- ^{a} "Get Dancin'" re-entered the top 10 at number 8 on 11 January 1975 (week ending).
- ^{b} "My Eyes Adored You" was originally going to be released by The Four Seasons but the recording was sold to lead singer Frankie Valli who released it as a solo artist.
- ^{c} The Rebelettes who backed Duane Eddy on "Play Me Like You Play Your Guitar" were not the same singers who backed him on his 1962 hit "(Dance with the) Guitar Man", but were a group of female session singers instead. The Rebelettes from 1962 were actually The Blossoms, a girl group consisting of Darlene Love, Fanita James, and Jean King.
- ^{d} "Honey" originally peaked at number 2 upon its initial release in 1968.
- ^{e} "The Night" was credited to Frankie Valli and The Four Seasons while "Who Loves You" is noted under The Four Seasons name (whose line-up included Frankie Valli).
- ^{f} "I Wanna Dance Wit Choo" re-entered the top 10 at number 8 on 31 May 1975 (week ending).
- ^{g} "The Israelites" originally peaked at number 1 upon its initial release in 1969.
- ^{h} "Have You Seen Her" originally peaked at number 3 upon its initial release in 1972, while "Oh Girl" originally peaked outside the top 10 at number 14 on its initial release that same year. In 1975, the two songs were re-issued together as a double A-sided single.
- ^{i} "Sealed With a Kiss" originally peaked at number 3 upon its initial release in 1962.
- ^{j} Mike Batt had one solo top ten single in 1975, "Summertime City", but he was also a producer and vocalist on The Wombles song "Wombling Merry Christmas".
- ^{k} "Space Oddity" originally peaked at number 5 upon its initial release in 1969.
- ^{l} "Let's Twist Again" originally peaked at number 2 upon its initial release in 1962. "The Twist" originally peaked outside the top 10 at number 49 on its initial release in 1960. It reached the top 20 for the first time in 1962, peaking at number 14. In 1975, the two songs were re-issued together as a double A-sided single.
- ^{m} "Happy to Be On An Island in the Sun" re-entered the top 10 at number 10 on 17 January 1976 (week ending).
- ^{n} Figure includes song that peaked in 1974.
- ^{o} Figure includes a top 10 hit with the group The Four Seasons.
- ^{p} Figure includes song that first charted in 1974 but peaked in 1975.
- ^{q} Figure includes a top 10 hit with the group The Wombles.

== See also ==
- 1975 in British music
- List of number-one singles from the 1970s (UK)
