= G. G. (album) =

Studio album by Gary Glitter
- Released: December 1975
- Recorded: 1974–1975
- Studios: Mediasound (New York City); Mayfair Studios (London)
- Genres: Funk; rhythm and blues; glam rock
- Length: 35:05
- Label: Bell
- Producers: Mark Munro; Bert De Coteaux; Tony Silvester

Gary Glitter chronology
Remember Me This Way (1974)	G. G. (1975)	Silver Star (1977)

G. G. (or Gary Glitter) is the third studio album by the English glam rock singer Gary Glitter, released in December 1975 by Bell Records.

== Background ==
The album was an attempt by Glitter to change his musical direction from the usual heavy glam rock that he had been recording on his previous two studio albums Glitter (1972) and Touch Me (1973). The G. G. album was produced by Mark Munro, Bert De Coteaux and Tony Silvester, unlike Glitter's previous efforts which were done by Mike Leander. Also unlike his previous albums, Glitter had very little to do with the composing of the songs, having only one credit as a songwriter on G. G. with "I'll Carry Your Picture (Everywhere)", which was the B-side of the hit single "Love Like You and Me". As well as attempting to broaden his style, the album was also an attempt to break Glitter into the music market of the United States. Although Glitter had previously had hit singles in the US in 1972 with "Rock and Roll" and "I Didn't Know I Loved You (Till I Saw You Rock and Roll)" and minor success with his debut album Glitter, his follow-ups did a lot poorer in the US than in other countries. Ironically, the G. G. album (or any singles from it) was never released in the USA.

Back in the United Kingdom, Glitter's homeland, the first single from the album "Papa-Oom-Mow-Mow", peaked as low as number 38. It was his worst chart showing to date, with his 11 previous singles all having reached the top 10. The album also performed poorly compared to his previous efforts.

"Satan's Daughter", a track composed for Glitter by Haras Fyre, was scheduled to be the follow-up single to "Papa-Oom-Mow-Mow" in early 1976, However, Glitter's record label were worried about the decline in record sales and the hundreds of unsold tickets at most venues on his current tour. To try to sell tickets (and records) they staged a publicity stunt saying Glitter would be retiring from live performing after the tour. As a result, the tour sold out, but they virtually stopped promoting the G. G. album and "Satan's Daughter" was never issued as a single. Instead, Bell Records opted for a 'safer' bet with the disco/rock number "You Belong to Me", with Mike Leander as producer, which charted in 1976 (this song was not included on the G. G. album in question, but was later included on Glitter's 1977 album Silver Star).

Although the G. G. album never charted in the UK, it has since picked up a cult following in ongoing years due to its funk and rhythm and blues sound, which makes it a very different sound from other Gary Glitter albums. G. G. eventually reached a world sales figure in the region of 300,000 copies, and over the years it has been available on most major formats, including vinyl, cassette, CD and 8-track.

== 2009 reissue ==
The album was reissued in 2009 under Airmail Records including three bonus tracks: "Love Like You And Me", "Doing Alright With The Boys" and "She-Cat, Alley Cat".

== Track listing ==
Side One

1. "Too Late to Put It Down" (Mike Katz) - 2:44
2. "Satan's Daughter" (Haras Fyre) - 4:01
3. "Easy Evil" (Alan O'Day) - 3:48
4. "Baby, I Love Your Way" (Peter Frampton) - 3:45
5. "Papa-Oom-Mow-Mow" (Al Frazier, Carl White, John Harris, Turner Wilson, Jr.) - 3:45

Side Two

1. "Finder's Keepers" (Ben Raleigh, Mark Barkan) - 3:31
2. "Basic Lady" (Allen Toussaint) - 3:38
3. "Cupid" (Sam Cooke) - 3:18
4. "I'll Carry Your Picture (Everywhere)" (Gary Glitter, Gerry Shephard) - 2:59
5. "Personality" (Harold Logan, Lloyd Price) - 3:36

=== Bonus tracks on 1996 reissue ===
11. "Superhero" 3:47 (Glitter, Mike Leander)
12. "I Hate You" 1:40 (composer unknown) - Paul Raven and the Boston Show Band
13. "It's Alright" 2:44 (Curtis Mayfield) - Paul Raven and the Boston Show Band
14. "Good for No Good" 2:37 (Glitter, Leander)

=== Bonus tracks on 2009 reissue ===
11. "Love Like You and Me" - 3:19 (Glitter, Gerry Shephard, Leander)
12. "Doing Alright with the Boys" - 3:17 (Glitter, Leander)
13. "She-Cat, Alley Cat" - 3:24 (Glitter, Leander)

== Personnel ==
- Gary Glitter - vocals
- Jeff Mironov, Jerry Friedman, Lance Quinn - guitar
- Pat Rebillot, Ricky Williams - keyboards
- Jimmy Young - drums
- George Devens, Teddy Sommer - percussion
- Carlos Martin - congas
- Diane Sumler, Luther Vandross, Robin Clark - background vocals
- Bert De Coteaux, Joe Renzetti - arrangements
- Uncredited - bass

Haras Fyre (pka Patrick Grant) on BMI
