= Remember Me This Way (album) =

Live album by Gary Glitter
- Released: June 1974
- Recorded: 17 November 1973
- Venue: Rainbow Theatre, London
- Genre: Glam rock, rock and roll
- Length: 41:18
- Label: Bell
- Producer: Mike Leander

Gary Glitter chronology
Touch Me (1973)	Remember Me This Way (1974)	G. G. (1975)

Remember Me This Way is a 1974 album by the English rock singer Gary Glitter. It features live concert performances from Glitter's 1973 Christmas show at The Rainbow in London and was released in conjunction with the movie/documentary of the same name that showed Glitter preparing for the tour. The album ends with a one-minute and 39-seconds edit of the studio recording of the title song, which follows on at the end of the live recording. It was Glitter's third top ten album, reaching a peak of #5 in his native UK.

== 2009 reissue ==
The album was reissued in 2009 under Airmail Records in conjunction with the reissues of Glitter, Touch Me & G.G.

== Track listing ==
All tracks composed by Gary Glitter and Mike Leander; except where indicated

1. "I'm the Leader of the Gang (I Am!)" - 4:54
2. "Sidewalk Sinner" - 2:53
3. "Baby Please Don't Go" (Big Joe Williams) - 4:15
4. "Do You Wanna Touch Me? (Oh Yeah!)" - 4:16
5. "The Wanderer" (Ernie Maresca) - 4:25
6. "Rock & Roll, Pt. 1 & 2" (Medley) - 5:16
7. "Hello, Hello, I'm Back Again" - 4:00
8. "I Didn't Know I Loved You (Till I Saw You Rock and Roll)" - 4:40
9. "I Love You Love Me Love" - 5:00
10. "Remember Me This Way" (snippet from the commercial single version only) - 1:39

Tracks 1–9 recorded live in concert at The Rainbow, London, 1973.

== Charts ==
Chart (1974)	Peak position
Australian (Kent Music Report)|	12
UK Albums (OCC)	5
