= Through the Years =

Through the Years may refer to:

== Music ==
- Through the Years, a 1932 Broadway musical with music by Vincent Youmans, or its title song

=== Albums ===
- Through the Years (Artillery album), 2007
- Through the Years (Cilla Black album) or the title song, 1993
- Through the Years (Jethro Tull album), 1998
- Through the Years / A Traves de los Años, by Selena, 2007
- Through the Years: The Best of the Fray, 2016
- Through the Years: A Retrospective, by Kenny Rogers, 1999
- Thru the Years, by John Mayall, 1971

=== Songs ===
- "Through the Years" (Kenny Rogers song), 1981
- "Through the Years", by Gary Glitter, 1992
- "Through the Years", by Invincible Overlord, 2005
- "Through the Years", by Kylie Minogue from Impossible Princess, 1997
