= Many Happy Returns =

Many happy returns is a greeting, often for birthdays.

Many Happy Returns may also refer to:

== Television ==
- "Many Happy Returns" (The Prisoner), a 1967 episode of the British television series The Prisoner
- "Many Happy Returns" (Diagnosis Murder), a 1994 episode of the American television series Diagnosis Murder
- "Many Happy Returns" (Eureka), a 2006 episode of the American television series Eureka
- "Many Happy Returns" (Person of Interest), an episode of the American television drama series Person of Interest
- Many Happy Returns (TV series), a 1964–1965 American television series
- Many Happy Returns to Lazarus, a 2004 television documentary about Simon Lazarus
- "Many Happy Returns", an episode of the animated television series Timothy Goes to School
- "Many Happy Returns", an episode of the BBC sitcom Goodnight Sweetheart
- "Many Happy Returns", an episode of the television series Ben 10: Omniverse
- "Many Happy Returns" (Sherlock), a 2013 "mini-sode" of the BBC television series Sherlock
- "Happy Returns", a 1985 episode of the BBC sitcom Only Fools and Horses

== Film ==
- Many Happy Returns (1922 film), a 1922 black-and-white silent short subject starring Vera White
- Many Happy Returns (1934 film), a 1934 film starring George Burns and Gracie Allen
- Many Happy Returns (1986 film), a 1986 TV movie starring George Segal and Ron Leibman
- Kyôso tanjô (English: Many Happy Returns), a 1993 Japanese comedy starring Takeshi Kitano
- Many Happy Returns (1996 animated film), Director/Animator Marjut Rimminen

== Other ==
- Many Happy Returns: The Hits, a 1992 greatest hits collection by singer Gary Glitter
- "Many Happy Returns", a song by Inspiral Carpets from the album Life
- "Many Happy Returns", a song by ABC from the album The Lexicon of Love
- "Many Happy Returns", a story arc in the 1996 Supergirl series by Peter David and Gary Frank
- Many Happy Returns, a 1942 comedy book on the income tax by Groucho Marx
- Happy Returns (company), an American software and reverse logistics company
- "Happy Returns", a song by Steven Wilson from the album Hand. Cannot. Erase.
- The Happy Return, the first of the Horatio Hornblower novels by C. S. Forester
