= On (Gary Glitter album) =

Studio album by Gary Glitter
- Released: September 2001
- Recorded: 1996–1997
- Genre: Rock
- Length: 49:16
- Label: Machmain
- Producers: Gary Glitter; Martin Jenkins; Kit Woolven

Gary Glitter chronology
The Ultimate Gary Glitter – 25 Years of Hits (1997)	On (2001)

On is the seventh and final studio album by the English glam rock singer Gary Glitter, released in September 2001 by Machmain.

== Background ==
The album contains new recordings of songs that were only ever performed live during Glitter's last concerts in 1996 and 1997. The album was released in 2001, two years after Glitter's UK conviction for possession of child pornography. It was available only for a short time through Glitter's website, and sold 5,000 copies worldwide. After his conviction, most major retailers had refused to stock and sell his music.

Nine of the twelve titles on the album, including the ballad "Never Want The Rain", were co-written by Glitter with Martin Jenkins. The other three tracks were new recordings of earlier Glitter titles; "Hooked On Hollywood" and "Hello, Hello, I'm Back Again" were co-written by Glitter with Mike Leander, and first recorded in the 1970s. "Ready To Rock" was originally recorded by Glitter for his 1991 album Leader 2. Though Glitter has not issued a new studio album since On, he has continued to release singles.

As children are a major audience of pop music, controversy arose around the release of the album On, due to assertions that Glitter was exploiting children. MP Tom Watson considered writing to the Home Secretary, David Blunkett to block the album's release, saying Glitter should be at the very least "handled with care". In response to the complaints, the British Phonographic Industry issued a statement saying that Glitter was now a free man and there were no legal reasons the album could not be released.

== Track listing ==
All tracks composed by Gary Glitter and Martin Jenkins; except where indicated

1. "Rock Hard Men Part 1 & 2" – 7:04
2. "Trade" – 4:06
3. "Whooz Being Good to You?"– 5:22
4. "Ready to Rock" (Glitter, Mark Pearson) – 4:04
5. "Lover Man" – 3:21
6. "You" – 4:22
7. "Hooked on Hollywood" (Glitter, Mike Leander) – 4:10
8. "Never Want the Rain" – 3:20
9. "(If) Lost on Life Street" (Glitter, Martin Jenkins; spoken lyrics taken from "If—" by Rudyard Kipling) – 5:03
10. "Hotshot" – 4:14
11. "Up for Love" – 3:51
- 12. "Hello, Hello, I'm Back Again (Again!)" (Glitter, Mike Leander) – 3:49 *This track can only be heard and played on a PC

== Personnel ==
- Gary Glitter – lead vocals
- Martin Jenkins – additional guitars, drum programming, backing vocals
- Bill Leisgang – guitars and dobro
- Andy Duncan – drum programming
- G. Miller – drum programming, keyboard bass
- J. Read – bass
- Laurence Cottle – bass
- Don Airey – keyboards
- The Kick Horns – brass
- Produced by Gary Glitter, Martin Jenkins, Kit Woolven and G. Miller
- Recorded at The Old Smithy, Somerset; The Stoneroom, London; The Greenhouse, London; Rooster, London; Parkgate, Sussex; and Unit 28, London.
- Mixed at Machmain Studio, London.
