= Glitter (Gary Glitter album) =

Studio album by Gary Glitter
- Released: October 1972
- Recorded: 1971–1972
- Studio: Mayfair Studios (London)
- Genres: Glam rock; rock and roll
- Length: 37:45
- Label: Bell
- Producer: Mike Leander

Gary Glitter chronology
| Glitter (1972) | Touch Me (1973) |

Singles from Glitter
- 1. "Rock and Roll" Released: 1972; 2. "I Didn't Know I Loved You (Till I Saw You Rock and Roll)" Released: 1972

Professional ratings
Review scores
| Source | Rating |
|---|---|
| AllMusic | 3/5 stars |
| Christgau's Record Guide | C |

Glitter is the debut studio album by the English glam rock singer Gary Glitter, produced by Mike Leander, and released by Bell Records. Two tracks, "I Didn't Know I Loved You (Till I Saw You Rock and Roll)" and "Rock and Roll", the latter a song in two parts, achieved success as singles; each spent time amongst the top 40 singles in both the US and UK.

The album featured, in addition to including the two singles, other original songs that generated fan support, including "Rock On!", "Shaky Sue" and "The Famous Instigator", as well as Glitter's versions of "Baby, Please Don't Go" (written and first performed by Big Joe Williams) and "The Wanderer" (first recorded by Dion DiMucci & the Del-Satins). The disc was a best-seller, reaching a high of number eight on the UK Albums Chart.

The album was the first by Glitter to achieve commercial success and presaged his 1973 album Touch Me. The album was also reissued in 1996 as a picture disc that was limited to 5,000 copies, which, along with containing the 12 tracks from the original album, also included four bonus tracks, which were "I'm the Leader of the Gang (I Am)", "It's Not a Lot", "Just Fancy That" and "Thank You Baby for Myself".

== 2009 re-issue ==
The album was reissued in 2009 under Airmail Records. This time it contained the 12 tracks from the original album and five bonus tracks: "I'm the Leader of the Gang (I Am)", "Just Fancy That", "I Love You Love Me Love", "Hands Up! It's a Stick-Up", and "Remember Me This Way".

== Track listing ==
Side one

1. "Rock and Roll Part 1" (Gary Glitter, Mike Leander) – 3:04
2. "Baby, Please Don't Go" (Big Joe Williams) – 2:53
3. "The Wanderer" (Ernie Maresca) – 2:44
4. "I Didn't Know I Loved You (Till I Saw You Rock and Roll)" (Glitter, Leander) – 3:22
5. "Ain't That a Shame" (Glitter, Leander, Edward Seago) – 2:39
6. "School Day (Ring! Ring! Goes the Bell)" (Chuck Berry) – 3:07

Side two

1. "Rock On!" (Glitter, Leander) – 3:32
2. "Donna" (Ritchie Valens) – 4:18
3. "The Famous Instigator" (Glitter, Leander) – 3:24
4. "The Clapping Song" (Lincoln Chase) – 3:13
5. "Shaky Sue" (Glitter, Leander, Seago) – 2:21
6. "Rock and Roll Part 2" (Glitter, Leander) – 3:00
- Sides one and two were combined as tracks 1–12 on CD reissues.

1996 CD bonus tracks

13. "I'm the Leader of the Gang (I Am)" (Glitter, Leander)
14. "It's Not a Lot (But It's All I Got)" (Glitter, Leander)
15. "Just Fancy That" (Glitter, Leander)
16. "Thank You Baby for Myself" (Glitter, Leander)

2009 CD bonus tracks

13. "I'm the Leader of the Gang (I Am)" (Glitter, Leander)
14. "Just Fancy That" (Glitter, Leander)
15. "I Love You Love Me Love" (Glitter, Leander)
16. "Hands Up! It's a Stick-Up" (Glitter, Leander)
17. "Remember Me This Way" (Glitter, Leander)

== Charts ==
Chart performance for Glitter
| Chart (1972–1973) | Peak position |
|---|---|
| Australian Albums (Kent Music Report) | 8 |
| German Albums (Offizielle Top 100) | 36 |
| UK Albums (Official Charts) | 8 |
| US Billboard 200 | 186 |

== Certifications ==
Certifications for Glitter
| Region | Certification | Certified units/sales |
|---|---|---|
| Australia (ARIA) | Gold | 20,000^{^} |
| United Kingdom (BPI) | Silver | 60,000^{^} |
^{^} Shipments figures based on certification alone.
