= Boys Will Be Boys (Gary Glitter album) =

Studio album by Gary Glitter
- Released: 10 March 1984
- Recorded: 1983
- Studio: Mayfair Studios; Fitz Studios
- Genre: Glam rock; rock and roll; pop rock
- Length: 43:18
- Label: Arista
- Producer: Mike Leander

Gary Glitter chronology
Silver Star (1977)	Boys Will Be Boys (1984)	Leader II (1991)

Singles from Boys Will Be Boys
- 1. "Dance Me Up" Released: June 1984; 2. "Shout, Shout, Shout" Released: 1984; 3. "Another Rock and Roll Christmas" Released: 1 December 1984

Boys Will Be Boys is the fifth studio album by the English glam rock singer Gary Glitter, released on 10 March 1984 by Arista Records. It features two top 30 hits: "Dance Me Up" and "Another Rock and Roll Christmas". It was the first album released by Glitter since Silver Star just under seven years earlier. Boys Will Be Boys was the last Gary Glitter album to be produced by Glitter's long-time music collaborator Mike Leander.

== Critical reception ==
Professional ratings
Review scores
Source	Rating
AllMusic	4/5 stars

In a retrospective review for AllMusic, critic Dave Thompson described the album as "a magnificent comeback and a powerful reminder that, even in his showbiz dotage, Gary Glitter remained one of Britain's greatest-ever entertainers."

== Track listing ==
All songs are written by Mike Leander, Eddie (Edward John) Seago and Gary Glitter, except where noted.

Side one

1. "Close to You" – 4:04
2. "Crash Crash" – 3:23
3. "Let's Get Sexy" – 3:37
4. "Dance Me Up" – 3:31
5. "When I'm On" (Glitter, Leander) – 4:32

Side two

6. "Another Rock and Roll Christmas" – 3:47
7. "Shout, Shout, Shout" – 8:54
8. "If You Want Me" – 4:34
9. "Hair of the Dog" – 3:12
10. "Boys Will Be Boys" – 3:44

== Personnel ==
Credits are adapted from the Boys Will Be Boys liner notes.

- Gary Glitter – lead and backing vocals
- Martin Jenkins – additional backing vocals

Production and artwork

- Mike Leander – producer
- John Hudson – engineer
- Jonathon Miller – engineer
- Simon Fowler – photography
- Nikki Morgan – makeup
- Nicolas Marchant – art direction
- Stylorouge – design
