= Another Rock and Roll Christmas =

Single by Gary Glitter

from the album Boys Will Be Boys
- Released: November 1984
- Recorded: 1984
- Genre: Glam rock; rock and roll; Christmas
- Length: 3:49
- Label: Arista
- Songwriters: Gary Glitter; Mike Leander; Eddie Seago
- Producer: Mike Leander

Gary Glitter singles chronology
"Shout, Shout, Shout" (1984)	"Another Rock and Roll Christmas" (1984)	"Love Comes" (1985)

Audio sample
- file; help

"Another Rock and Roll Christmas" is a 1984 Christmas song by the English glam rock singer Gary Glitter, written by Glitter with Mike Leander and Eddie Seago and produced by Leander. It was one of the most played and popular Christmas hits on UK radio from the mid-1980s to the mid-1990s, prior to Glitter's 1997 arrest, and 1999 conviction for possession of child pornography. Released as a single in November 1984, the song was taken from Glitter's fifth studio album, Boys Will Be Boys (1984).

"Another Rock and Roll Christmas" was reissued many times, both as a single (including a collectors picture disc) and on several Christmas compilation albums that were released prior to the singer's 1999 conviction for sexual offences. More recently, "Another Rock and Roll Christmas" was digitally remastered on the 2011 greatest hits CD release All That Glitters.

== Charts ==
The single, which reached No. 7 on the UK singles chart, was Glitter's most successful song since 1975. Though he was still touring regularly when the song was released, Glitter credited "Another Rock and Roll Christmas" as a song that gave him a resurgence in popularity. After the success of "Another Rock and Roll Christmas", Glitter played at annual live Christmas tours across Britain and Europe for over a decade, until the last live shows of Glitter's career in December 1997.

"Another Rock and Roll Christmas" was Gary Glitter's final UK Top 40 hit, aside from his featured guest appearance on "Doctorin' the Tardis", the 1988 UK number one hit by the Timelords, which sampled both the Doctor Who theme music and Glitter's own "Rock and Roll", along with sections from "Block Buster!" by the Sweet.

== Certifications ==
Region	Certification	Certified units/sales
United Kingdom (BPI)	Silver	250,000^{^}
^{^} Shipments figures based on certification alone.

== Track listing ==
1. "Another Rock and Roll Christmas"
2. "Another Rock and Roll Christmas (Instrumental Remix)"
