= Leader II =

Studio album by Gary Glitter
- Released: 1991
- Recorded: 1990–1991
- Genres: Rock; rap
- Length: 43:35
- Label: Edel Music
- Producer: Paul Gadd Jr.

Gary Glitter chronology
Boys Will Be Boys (1984)	Leader II (1991)	The Ultimate Gary Glitter – 25 Years of Hits (1997)

Leader II is the sixth studio album by the English glam rock singer Gary Glitter. It was his first album in seven years, 1984's Boys Will Be Boys being his previous album. The album includes the single "Ready to Rock".

Mark Pearson played all of the instruments, except for the saxophone. The album was recorded at the Greenhouse in London N1 and was produced by Glitter's son, Paul Gadd, Jr.

== Track listing ==
All songs written by Gary Glitter and Mark Pearson

- Side One
1. "Ready to Rock" 3:52
2. "Tonight" 4:12
3. "Why Do You Do It" 4:09
4. "Wild Woman" 3:53
5. "(The Only Way To) Survive" 5:09
- Side Two
1. "Lets Go Party" 3:43
2. "Are You Hard Enough" 4:27
3. "Shake It Up" 4:03
4. "It's Enough" 5:40
5. "Am I Losing You" 4:27

== Personnel ==
- Gary Glitter – vocals
- Mark Pearson – guitar, bass, keyboards, backing vocals, drums, percussion, drum programming
- Simeon Jones – tenor saxophone (except tracks 3 and 7)
- John Earle – tenor and baritone saxophone (tracks 3 and 7)
- Lorna Barnett – backing vocals (track 6)
- Paul Gadd, Jr. – producer (except track 6)
- John Hudson – producer (track 6)
