= Silver Star (album) =

Studio album by Gary Glitter
- Released: 5 April 1977
- Recorded: 1976–1977
- Genre: Glam rock; rock and roll; disco
- Length: 34:56
- Label: Arista
- Producer: Mike Leander

Gary Glitter chronology
G. G. (1975)	Silver Star (1977)	Boys Will Be Boys (1984)

Silver Star is the fourth studio album by the English glam rock singer Gary Glitter, released on 5 April 1977 by Arista Records. The album saw the return of Mike Leander as producer and co-writer, after being absent from Glitter's previous studio album G. G. (1975).

The album contained three hit singles, "You Belong to Me" (released as the single "Bell 1473"), "It Takes All Night Long" (the album version of the song is extended), and "A Little Boogie Woogie in the Back of My Mind" (which was a hit in the British singles charts twice, thanks to a cover version by Shakin' Stevens in 1987).

Other selections include Gary's version of "Rock and Roll (I Gave You the Best Years of My Life)" (a previous hit for its writer, Kevin Johnson), a rock number "Summertime Blues Out", the good time boogie track "Heartbreaking Blue Eyed Boy", a tribute to the world's entertainment capital, "Hooked on Hollywood", as well as the fan favourites "Haven't I Seen You Somewhere Before?" and "Oh What a Fool I Have Been".

The album fused glam rock, rock and roll and disco, and was designed to expand Glitter's fan base, especially in the United States, where he had a top 10 hit with "Rock and Roll" several years previously but a country where he had done a lot worse commercially compared to other countries. Sales of Silver Star were disappointing and it failed to chart inside the all-important Top 50 on either side of the Atlantic. Nevertheless, Silver Star went on to become a classic amongst his loyal fan base, and it was even voted the number one album of his career by his fan club in 1996.

The 2006 and 2008 CD reissues of Silver Star contained bonus tracks.

== Track listing ==
All tracks are written by Gary Glitter, Mike Leander and Eddie Seago (except where indicated).

Side 1
No.	Title	Writer(s)	Released as a single on	Length
1.	"You Belong to Me"	Glitter, Leander	Bell 1473	3:31
2.	"Haven't I Seen You Somewhere Before?"			3:04
3.	"I Dare You to Lay One on Me"			2:31
4.	"Roll of the Dice"			3:01
5.	"Hooked on Hollywood"		Arista 60369 FR	2:48
6.	"Summertime Blues Out"			2:32
Total length:				17:27

Side 2
No.	Title	Writer(s)	Released as a single on	Length
7.	"It Takes All Night Long"		Arista 85	5:16
8.	"Oh, What a Fool I Have Been"		Arista 137	2:32
9.	"Heartbreaking Blue Eyed Boy"			2:52
10.	"Rock and Roll (I Gave You the Best Years of My Life)"	Kevin Johnson		3:32
11.	"A Little Boogie Woogie in the Back of My Mind"		Arista 112	3:07
Total length:				17:29

2006 and 2008 CD reissues
No.	Title	Writer(s)	Length
12.	"The Treat of 42nd Street"		2:15
13.	"365 Days (Hurry on Home)"	Glitter, Leander	2:20
Total length:			4:35

2006 CD reissue only
No.	Title	Writer(s)	Length
14.	"I'm the Leader of the Gang (I Am) – with Girlschool"	Glitter, Leander	4:51
Total length:			4:51
