= Dance Me Up =

Single by Gary Glitter

from the album Boys Will Be Boys
- B-side: "Too Young to Dance"
- Released: June 1984
- Genre: Pop rock
- Length: 3:30 (Album/Single Version) 5:48 (12' Version)
- Label: Arista
- Songwriter(s): Gary Glitter; Mike Leander; Eddie (Edward John) Seago
- Producer(s): Mike Leander

Gary Glitter singles chronology
| "Suspicious Minds" (1982) | "Dance Me Up" (1984) | "Shout, Shout, Shout" (1984) |

Music video
- "Dance Me Up" on YouTube

"Dance Me Up" is a song by the English glam rock singer Gary Glitter, written by Glitter with Mike Leander and Eddie (Edward John) Seago and produced by Mike Leander. It was released as the second single from his fifth studio album, Boys Will Be Boys (1984). The single features the non-album track, "Too Young to Dance" as its B-side, which was exclusive to the single.

The single was released in Europe in June 1984. On 21 June 1984, Glitter appeared on Top of the Pops with the song, despite it being at No. 48 on the UK Singles Chart that week. At the time, Top of the Pops had a general policy of not showing any songs outside of the Top 40, though had relaxed this on rare occasions. Following Glitter's Top of the Pops performance, the song peaked at No. 25 on the UK Singles Chart.

== Track listing ==
- 12" Maxi (ARIST 22570)
1. "Dance Me Up (Extended Mix)"
2. "Too Young to Dance"
3. "All That Glitters (Medley)"
- 12" Single
1. "Dance Me Up (12" Extended Mix)"
2. "Too Young to Dance"
- 7" Single
1. "Dance Me Up"
2. "Too Young to Dance"

== Chart performance ==
| Chart | Position |
|---|---|
| Ireland (IRMA) | 25 |
| UK Singles Chart | 25 |
