= Always Yours =

Single by Gary Glitter
- B-side: "I'm Right, You're Wrong, I Win!"
- Released: 1974
- Genre: Glam rock
- Length: 3:23
- Label: Bell
- Songwriters: Gary Glitter; Mike Leander
- Producer: Mike Leander

Gary Glitter singles chronology
"Remember Me This Way" (1974)	"Always Yours" (1974)	"Oh Yes! You're Beautiful" (1974)

"Always Yours" is a song by the English glam rock singer Gary Glitter, written by Glitter with Mike Leander and produced by Mike Leander. It was released as a standalone single in the UK in 1974, and was Glitter's third and final number-one single on the UK singles chart, spending a week at the top of the chart in June 1974. It also spent two weeks at number-one in Ireland, and peaked at No. 11 in Australia and No. 14 in Germany. The single features the non-album track, "I'm Right, You're Wrong, I Win!" as its B-side, which was exclusive to the single.

== Track listing ==
1. "Always Yours" – 3:23
2. "I'm Right, You're Wrong, I Win!" – 2:41

== Chart performance ==
Chart	Position
Australia (Kent Music Report)	11
Germany (GfK)	14
Ireland (IRMA)	1
Netherlands (Dutch Top 40)	25
UK singles chart	1

== Certifications ==
Region	Certification	Certified units/sales
United Kingdom (BPI)	Silver	250,000^{^}
^{^} Shipments figures based on certification alone.
