= Touch Me (Gary Glitter album) =

Studio album by Gary Glitter
- Released: 1 June 1973
- Recorded: 1972–1973
- Studios: Mayfair Studios, London
- Genres: Glam rock; rock and roll; pop rock; hard rock
- Length: 35:41
- Label: Bell
- Producer: Mike Leander

Gary Glitter chronology
Glitter (1972)	Touch Me (1973)	Remember Me This Way (1974)

Singles from Touch Me
- 1. "Do You Wanna Touch Me" Released: January 1973; 2. "Hello, Hello, I'm Back Again" Released: April 1973

Professional ratings
Review scores
Source	Rating
AllMusic	2.5/5 stars

Touch Me is the second studio album by the English glam rock singer Gary Glitter. It was originally released in June 1973, on the label Bell, and was produced by Mike Leander. It is Glitter's bestselling album, peaking at No. 2 on the UK Albums Chart. It features the top-5 hits "Do You Wanna Touch Me" and "Hello, Hello, I'm Back Again".

In 1995, the album was reissued in Australia on CD, with the track listing reversing sides one and two from the original album, and adding four bonus tracks: "I'll Carry Your Picture Everywhere", "Oh Yes! You're Beautiful", "I Would If I Could but I Can't" and "I'm Right, You're Wrong, I Win!".

In 1996, the album was reissued as a picture disc in the UK, limited to 5,000 copies and containing the 12 tracks from the original album plus the four bonus tracks "Oh Yes! You're Beautiful", "I Would If I Could but I Can't", "I'm Right, You're Wrong, I Win!" and "I'll Carry Your Picture Everywhere".

== 2009 reissue ==
The album was reissued in 2009 under Airmail Records. This time it contained the 12 tracks from the original album and four bonus tracks: "Oh Yes! You're Beautiful", "I Would If I Could but I Can't", "I'm Right, You're Wrong, I Win!" and "Thank You Baby for Myself".

== Critical reception ==
Donald A. Guarisco of AllMusic gave the album two and a half out of five stars and wrote that "Touch Me lacks the strength or variety that would allow it to appeal to anyone beyond glam rock's cult audience but it contains enough solid songs to appeal to lovers of glam."

== Track listing ==
All tracks are written by Gary Glitter and Mike Leander, except where noted.

Side one
No.	Title	Writer(s)	Length
1.	"Hello! Hello! I'm Back Again"		3:19
2.	"Sidewalk Sinner"		2:31
3.	"Didn't I Do It Right"		3:20
4.	"Lonely Boy"	Paul Anka	3:27
5.	"Hold On to What You Got"		3:16
6.	"I.O.U."		3:06

Side two
No.	Title	Writer(s)	Length
7.	"Do You Wanna Touch Me (Oh Yeah)"		3:19
8.	"Come On, Come In, Get On"		2:31
9.	"Happy Birthday"		2:56
10.	"Hard on Me"		2:15
11.	"To Know You Is to Love You"	Phil Spector	2:49
12.	"Money Honey"	Jesse Stone	2:52
Total length:			35:41

The 1995 Australian CD release and the early copies of the 1996 UK Picture Disc CD switched sides one and two around.

1996 picture disc bonus tracks
No.	Title	Writer(s)	Length
13.	"Oh Yes! You're Beautiful"		3:49
14.	"I Would If I Could but I Can't"		2:49
15.	"I'm Right, You're Wrong, I Win"		2:37
16.	"I'll Carry Your Picture Everywhere"	Gary Glitter; Gerry Shephard	3:05

2009 reissue bonus tracks
No.	Title	Length
13.	"Oh Yes! You're Beautiful"	3:49
14.	"I Would If I Could but I Can't"	2:49
15.	"I'm Right, You're Wrong, I Win"	2:37
16.	"Thank You Baby for Myself"	3:39

== Personnel ==
Technical

- John Hudson – engineer, recording supervisor
- Shepard Sherbell – photography

== Charts ==
Chart performance for Touch Me
Chart (1972)	Peak position
Australian Albums (Kent Music Report)	11
Finnish Albums (Suomen virallinen lista)	1
UK Albums Chart	2
West German Media Control Albums Chart	21

== Certifications ==
Certifications for Touch Me
Region	Certification	Certified units/sales
Australia (ARIA)	Gold	20,000^{^}
Finland (Musiikkituottajat)	Gold	20,000
United Kingdom (BPI)	Silver	60,000^{^}
^{^} Shipments figures based on certification alone.
