= D.I.V.O.R.C.E. =

Single by Billy Connolly
- B-side: "Cuckoo"
- Released: 1975
- Genre: Novelty; drinking song
- Label: Polydor Records
- Songwriters: Sheb Wooley Bobby Braddock and Curly Putman
- Producer: Phil Coulter

"D.I.V.O.R.C.E." is a song originally recorded in 1969 by Sheb Wooley under the pseudonym Ben Colder. It is a parody of the Tammy Wynette song "D-I-V-O-R-C-E", released the previous year. A 1975 recording by the Scottish folk singer and comedian Billy Connolly reached No. 1 on the UK singles chart for one week in November 1975, and is one of the few songs of its genre to reach this milestone. It also peaked at No. 16 in New Zealand.. Connolly's version to date has been his only No. 1 UK single, though in the late 1970s he had a further two UK hits which parodied contemporary songs. He later dropped musical performances from his act.

"D.I.V.O.R.C.E." has a similar theme to Wynette's original in that the events in the song lead to a couple divorcing, however in the parody, the words are spelled out to withhold the truth from a dog rather than a child as in Wynette's version, and the divorce is sparked by a riotous visit to a veterinarian that results in the husband being bitten by both the dog and his wife.

Some versions of the song, such as the live performance included on the album Get Right Intae Him! which was released as the single, are censored, with the letters "f'ing c" being bleeped.
