= Oh Yes! You're Beautiful =

Single by Gary Glitter
- B-side: "Thank You, Baby, for Myself"
- Released: 1974
- Genre: Glam rock
- Length: 3:51
- Label: Bell
- Songwriters: Gary Glitter; Mike Leander
- Producer: Mike Leander

Gary Glitter singles chronology
"Always Yours" (1974)	"Oh Yes! You're Beautiful" (1974)	"Love Like You and Me" (1975)

Official audio
- "Oh Yes! You're Beautiful" on YouTube

"Oh Yes! You're Beautiful" is a song by the English glam rock singer Gary Glitter, written by Glitter with Mike Leander and produced by Leander. It was released as a standalone single in the UK in 1974, and peaked at No. 2 on the UK singles chart. The single features the non-album track, "Thank You, Baby, for Myself" as its B-side, which was exclusive to the single.

== Track listing ==
1. "Oh Yes! You're Beautiful" – 3:38
2. "Thank You, Baby, for Myself" – 3:35

== Chart performance ==
Chart	Position
Australia (Kent Music Report)	10
Ireland (IRMA)	1
UK singles chart	2
West Germany (GfK)	28

== Certifications ==
Region	Certification	Certified units/sales
United Kingdom (BPI)	Silver	250,000^{^}
^{^} Shipments figures based on certification alone.
