= Love Like You and Me =

1975 single by Gary Glitter

Single by Gary Glitter
- B-side: "I'll Carry Your Picture (Everywhere)"
- Released: 1975
- Genre: Glam rock; Pop rock; pop
- Length: 3:18
- Label: Bell
- Songwriters: Gary Glitter; Gerry Shephard; Mike Leander
- Producer: Mike Leander

Gary Glitter singles chronology
"Oh Yes! You're Beautiful" (1974)	"Love Like You and Me" (1975)	"Doing Alright with the Boys" (1975)

"Love Like You and Me" is a song by the English glam rock singer Gary Glitter, written by Glitter with Gerry Shephard and Mike Leander and produced by Mike Leander. It was released as a standalone single in the UK in 1975, and peaked at No. 10 on the UK singles chart.

== Track listing ==
1. "Love Like You and Me" – 3:18
2. "I'll Carry Your Picture (Everywhere)" – 3:06

== Chart performance ==
Chart	Position
Australia (Kent Music Report)	99
Ireland (IRMA)	11
UK singles chart	10
