= Do You Wanna Touch Me =

1973 single by Gary Glitter

"Do You Wanna Touch Me?"

Single by Gary Glitter

from the album Touch Me
- B-side: "I Would If I Could but I Can't"
- Released: January 1973
- Recorded: 1972
- Studio: Mayfair, London
- Genre: Glam rock
- Length: 3:19
- Label: Bell
- Songwriters: Gary Glitter; Mike Leander
- Producer: Mike Leander

Gary Glitter singles chronology
"I Didn't Know I Loved You (Till I Saw You Rock and Roll)" (1972)	"Do You Wanna Touch Me?" (1973)	"Hello, Hello, I'm Back Again" (1973)

"Do You Wanna Touch Me", also referred to as "Do You Wanna Touch Me? (Oh Yeah)" is a song by the English glam rock singer Gary Glitter, written by Glitter with Mike Leander and produced by Leander. It was released as the lead single from his second studio album, Touch Me (1973), peaking at No. 2 on the UK singles chart in January 1973, his third successive UK hit. The single also reached No. 9 in Ireland and No. 11 in Australia.

== Joan Jett version ==
"Do You Wanna Touch Me (Oh Yeah)"

Single by Joan Jett and the Blackhearts

from the album Bad Reputation
- B-side: "Victim of Circumstance"
- Released: 23 July 1982
- Genre: Glam rock
- Length: 3:48 (album version); 3:24 (single version)
- Label: Boardwalk
- Songwriters: Gary Glitter; Mike Leander
- Producers: Kenny Laguna; Ritchie Cordell

Joan Jett and the Blackhearts singles chronology
"Crimson and Clover" (1982)	"Do You Wanna Touch Me (Oh Yeah)" (1982)	"Nag" (1982)

Music video
- "Do You Wanna Touch Me (Oh Yeah)" on YouTube

"Do You Wanna Touch Me (Oh Yeah)" was later covered by American rock singer Joan Jett in 1980 for her debut solo studio album, Bad Reputation (1981). Following the success of "I Love Rock 'n' Roll" nearly two years later, the song was released as a single in the summer of 1982 and reached No. 20 on the Billboard Hot 100 that September. In Canada, the song spent two weeks at No. 8.

Jett's version of the song appears in a 2008 TV commercial for Hewlett-Packard's TouchSmart computers. The commercial was withdrawn when the company learned that Glitter, now a convicted sex offender, had written the song. On 29 October 2008, it was reported that Glitter would receive £100,000 in royalties from Hewlett-Packard for the advertisement.

=== Track listings and formats ===
- 7" and 12" vinyl
1. "Do You Wanna Touch Me (Oh Yeah)" – 3:24
2. "Victim of Circumstance" – 2:54
- US 12" vinyl promo
1. "Do You Wanna Touch Me (Oh Yeah)" – 3:39
2. "Summertime Blues" – 2:23
- Australian and New Zealand 12" vinyl
1. "Do You Wanna Touch Me (Oh Yeah)" – 3:24
2. "Victim of Circumstance" – 2:54
3. "Summertime Blues" – 2:16
- Brazilian and Greek 7" vinyl
1. "Do You Wanna Touch Me (Oh Yeah)" – 3:24
2. "Bad Reputation" – 2:48
- Ireland, Spain and United Kingdom 7" vinyl
1. "Do You Wanna Touch Me (Oh Yeah)" – 3:24
2. "Jezebel" – 3:25 (UK release labeled as "Jezebel," but actual cut was "Bad Reputation")
- Mexican 7" vinyl
1. "Do You Wanna Touch Me (Oh Yeah)" – 3:24
2. "Wooly Bully" – 2:18

=== Credits and personnel ===
Credits and personnel are adapted from the Bad Reputation album liner notes.

- Joan Jett – vocals, guitar, backing vocals
- Gary Glitter – writer
- Mike Leander – writer
- Lea Hart – guitar, backing vocals
- Kenny Laguna – piano, backing vocals, producer
- John Earle – saxophone
- Paul Simmons – drums, backing vocals
- Jeff Peters – bass, backing vocals
- Ritchie Cordell – backing vocals, producer
- John Earle – saxophone
- Mark Dodson – engineer, associate producer
- Butch Yates – assistant engineer
- Malcolm Davis – mastering

=== Weekly charts ===
Chart (1982)	Peak position
Australia (Kent Music Report)	18
Austria	19
Canada RPM Top Singles	8
Germany	19
New Zealand (RIANZ)	11
Switzerland	12
US Billboard Hot 100	20
US Billboard Mainstream Rock	21
US Cash Box Top 100	29

=== Year-end charts ===
Chart (1982)	Rank
Canada	73
US (Joel Whitburn's Pop Annual)	123

=== Release history ===
Region	Date	Formats(s)	Label(s)	Ref(s).
United States	23 July 1982	Adult rock	Boardwalk	

== Glee cover controversy ==
In 2011, the song was covered by guest star Gwyneth Paltrow and other cast members for the season 2 episode 15 of the musical television series Glee, "Sexy". The performance caused some controversy in the UK over the resulting royalty payments to Glitter, who was by then a convicted sex offender. The charity Kidscape described the song's inclusion as "wholly inappropriate". The UK version of the album Glee: The Music, Volume 5 does not therefore include the song, but replaces it with the cover of "Afternoon Delight" by Starland Vocal Band from the same episode.

== See also ==
- "Oh Yeah!", a Green Day song that samples Jett's version of the song.
