= Hello, Hello, I'm Back Again =

1973 single by Gary Glitter

Single by Gary Glitter

from the album Touch Me
- B-side: "I.O.U."
- Released: April 1973
- Genre: Glam rock
- Length: 3:21
- Label: Bell
- Songwriters: Gary Glitter; Mike Leander
- Producer: Mike Leander

Gary Glitter singles chronology
"Do You Wanna Touch Me" (1973)	"Hello, Hello, I'm Back Again" (1973)	"I'm the Leader of the Gang (I Am)" (1973)

"Hello, Hello, I'm Back Again" is a song by the English glam rock singer Gary Glitter, written by Glitter with Mike Leander and produced by Mike Leander. The precise title of the song is only said twice during the song, and as a result other more frequent sung lines have become alternative titles, these include "Hello, Hello, It's Good to Be Back", "It's Good to Be Back" and "Did You Miss Me?". Sometimes the title is shortened to simply "Hello, Hello".

== Background ==
The song is about a man calling his lover after being away for some time and begins with "Did you miss me (yeah), while I was away?", with "Hello, hello, it's good to be back, it's good to be back" sung repeatedly in the chorus. It peaked at No. 2 on the UK Singles Chart and charted in several other countries and remained a popular oldie for decades. It was also often sung at football matches, with the lyrics "Hello, hello" (insert team name) "are back". The song has been featured on a number of Glitter compilation and live albums since, as well as his second studio album, Touch Me (1973). In 1995 the song returned to the UK charts when Glitter re-recorded it, under the title "Hello, Hello, I'm Back Again (Again!)".

== The Young Gods cover ==
"Did You Miss Me?"

Single by The Young Gods

from the album The Young Gods
- B-side: "The Irrtum Boys"
- Released: February 1987
- Recorded: Artag Studio, Zurich
- Genre: Industrial
- Length: 3:22
- Label: Organik
- Songwriters: Gary Glitter; Mike Leander
- Producer: Roli Mosimann

The Young Gods singles chronology
"Envoyé!" (1986)	"Did You Miss Me?" (1987)	"L'Amourir" (1988)

Swiss post-industrial band the Young Gods covered the song for their eponymous 1987 debut album The Young Gods under the title "Did You Miss Me?" and released it as a single in the same year.

=== Track listing ===
1. "Did You Miss Me? Hello, Hello I'm Back Again!" – 3:22
2. "The Irrtum Boys" – 2:41

=== Chart performance ===
Chart (1987)	Peak position
UK Independent Chart	36

== Certifications ==
Region	Certification	Certified units/sales
United Kingdom (BPI)	Silver	250,000^{^}
^{^} Shipments figures based on certification alone.
