= Remember Me This Way (song) =

Single by Gary Glitter
- B-side: "It's Not a Lot (But It's All I Got)"
- Released: 1974
- Genre: Glam rock; pop
- Length: 4:18
- Label: Bell
- Songwriters: Gary Glitter; Mike Leander
- Producer: Mike Leander

Gary Glitter singles chronology
"I Love You Love Me Love" (1973)	"Remember Me This Way" (1974)	"Always Yours" (1974)

"Remember Me This Way" is a song by the English glam rock singer Gary Glitter, written by Glitter with Mike Leander and produced by Mike Leander. Unlike Glitter's previous singles this was a slow ballad that surprised many at the time. Nevertheless, it went on to peak at No. 3 on the UK singles chart. The single features the non-album track, "It's Not a Lot (But It's All I Got)" as its B-side, which was exclusive to the single.

== Track listing ==
1. "Remember Me This Way" – 4:18
2. "It's Not a Lot (But It's All I Got)" – 2:26

== Chart performance ==
Chart	Position
Australia (Kent Music Report)	31
Ireland (IRMA)	9
UK singles chart	3
West Germany (GfK)	50

== Certifications ==
Region	Certification	Certified units/sales
United Kingdom (BPI)	Silver	250,000^{^}
^{^} Shipments figures based on certification alone.
