= Doing Alright with the Boys =

Single by Gary Glitter
- B-side: "Good for No Good"
- Released: 1975
- Genre: Glam rock
- Length: 3:18
- Label: Bell
- Songwriter(s): Gary Glitter; Mike Leander
- Producer(s): Mike Leander

Gary Glitter singles chronology
"Love Like You and Me" (1975)	"Doing Alright with the Boys" (1975)	"Papa-Oom-Mow-Mow" (1975)

"Doing Alright with the Boys" is a song by the English glam rock singer Gary Glitter, written by Glitter with Mike Leander and produced by Mike Leander. It was released as a standalone single in the UK in 1975, and peaked at No. 6 on the UK Singles Chart. The single features the non-album track, "Good for No Good" as its B-side, which was exclusive to the single.

In 1980 Joan Jett covered the song for her debut solo studio album, Bad Reputation.

== Track listing ==
1. "Doing Alright with the Boys" – 3:18
2. "Good for No Good" – 2:39

== Chart performance ==
Chart	Position
Ireland (IRMA)	3
UK Singles Chart	6
