= Gary Glitter =

British musician and sex offender (born 1944)

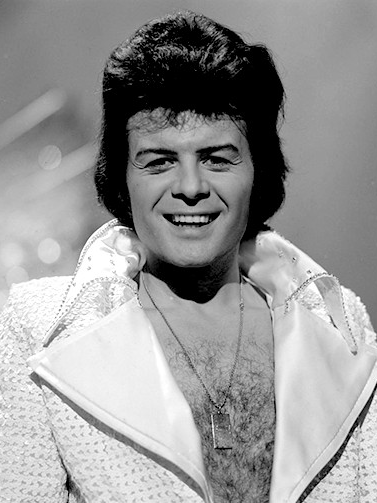
- Glitter in 1974
- Born: Paul Francis Gadd; 8 May 1944 (age 82); Banbury, Oxfordshire, England
- Other names: Paul Raven; Rubber Bucket; Paul Monday; Paul Russell
- Occupations: Musician; songwriter; record producer
- Years active: 1960–2005
- Spouse: Ann Murton (m. 1963; div. 1972)
- Children: 3
- Status: Imprisoned
- Criminal charges: Possession of child pornography; Child sexual abuse; Attempted rape of minors
- Penalty: 16 years in prison
- Musical career
- Genres: Glam rock; rock and roll; pop rock; hard rock; disco
- Instrument: Vocals
- Works: Discography
- Labels: Decca; Bell; MCA; EMI; Polydor; GTO; Epic; Arista; Stiff; Castle Communications; Virgin; Attitude; Snapper; Machmain

Paul Francis Gadd (born 8 May 1944), better known by his stage name Gary Glitter, is a British former singer who achieved fame and success during the 1970s and 1980s. His career ended after his 1999 conviction of downloading child sexual abuse material. He was also convicted of child sexual abuse in 2006 and a series of sexual offences, including attempted rape, in 2015.

After performing under the name Paul Raven during the 1960s, Gadd changed his stage name to Gary Glitter in the early 1970s and had a sustained solo career with his hits "Rock and Roll (Parts 1 and 2)", "Do You Wanna Touch Me", "I Love You Love Me Love", "I'm the Leader of the Gang (I Am)", and "Hello, Hello, I'm Back Again". He became known for his energetic live performances and glam rock persona of glitter suits, make-up, and platform boots. He has sold over 20 million records and had 26 hit singles, which spent a total of 180 weeks in the UK Singles Chart, with 12 reaching the top 10 and three of those charting at number one. Touch Me (1973) is Glitter's best-selling album, peaking at No. 2 on the UK Albums Chart. As of 2001, he was listed in the top 100 most successful UK chart acts. His popularity waned during the late 1970s, and was followed by a successful comeback as a solo artist in the 1980s; his 1984 song "Another Rock and Roll Christmas" was one of the most played Christmas songs of all time. In 1998, his recording of "Rock and Roll" was listed as one of the top 1,001 songs in music history. He also released seven studio albums and at least 15 albums of compilations and live performances.

BBC News described Glitter's fall from grace as "dramatic" and "spectacular". He was arrested in 1997 and convicted and imprisoned in 1999 for downloading thousands of child pornography images and videos. He was acquitted of a charge of sexual activity with an underage girl in the 1970s. He later faced criminal charges and deportation from several countries in connection with both actual and suspected child sexual abuse. He was deported from Cambodia on suspected child sexual abuse charges in 2002 and settled in Vietnam, where a court found him guilty of obscene acts with minors in 2006. After serving his sentence, he was deported to the UK and was placed on the Sex Offenders' Register for life. After the Jimmy Savile sexual abuse scandal, Gadd was arrested again in 2012, as part of Operation Yewtree. He was released on bail, and was charged in 2014 with historical child sex offences; since then episodes of the music show Top of the Pops on which he performed are no longer repeated. In 2015, he was found guilty of one count of attempted rape, one count of unlawful sexual intercourse with a girl under 13, and four counts of indecent assault; he was sentenced to 16 years in prison, and described by music journalist Alexis Petridis as a "public hate figure". He was released on licence in February 2023 after serving half of his sentence, but recalled to prison the next month after breaching the conditions of his licence. His parole application was denied in June 2025, and he was charged with further historical sex offences in 2026.

== Early life ==
Paul Francis Gadd was born in Banbury, Oxfordshire, on 8 May 1944. He never knew his father, while his mother worked as a cleaner and was unmarried; she initially brought him up with the help of her mother. He was hard to control and was taken into local authority care at the age of 10, along with his brother. Although nominally a Protestant, he was educated at a Catholic school. He frequently ran away to London, visiting the nightclubs where he would later launch his career.

== Career ==
=== Early work as Paul Raven ===
By the time he was 16, Gadd was already performing at London clubs. His career grew as he appeared at such venues as the Two I's in Soho, and the Laconda and Safari Clubs. His repertoire consisted of early rock and roll standards and gentle ballads. Gadd gained his first break when film producer Robert Hartford-Davis discovered him and financed a recording session for Decca Records. In January 1960, at 15, under the stage name Paul Raven, he released his first single, "Alone in the Night".

A year later, with a new manager, Vic Billings, he signed a new recording contract with Parlophone and worked with record producer George Martin, before Martin's association with the Beatles. Martin produced two singles, "Walk on Boy" and "Tower of Strength", but neither sold very well, and Gadd's recording career as Paul Raven stalled. By 1964, he was reduced to working as an assistant, and playing the warm-up for the British music television programme Ready Steady Go! He did numerous television commercials and film auditions, and in the course of those activities met arranger and record producer Mike Leander, who eventually helped revive his career.

Still using the name Paul Raven, Gadd joined the Mike Leander Show Band in early 1965. He was then deputised to produce a few recording sessions by such artists as Thane Russell and a Scottish freakbeat band, the Poets. After Leander's group disbanded, he formed Boston International with saxophonist John Rossall, and spent the following five years touring the UK and West Germany, recording occasionally. From 1968 to 1970, several singles including "Musical Man", "Goodbye Seattle" and a cover version of the Beatles' "Here Comes the Sun" were released, his name briefly changed to Paul Monday. He sang the role of a priest in the original 1970 concept album of Jesus Christ Superstar.

=== Gary Glitter ===
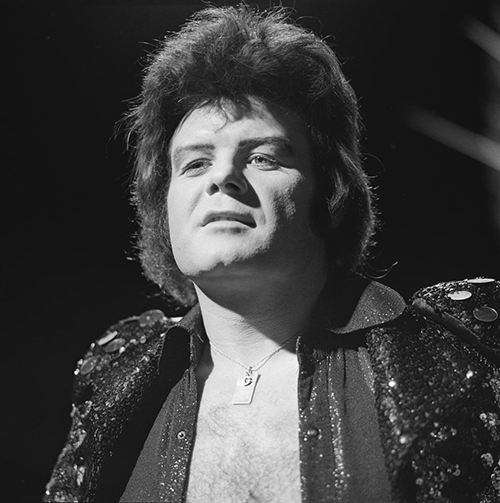
Glitter in 1973, during an appearance on TopPop

As the glam movement took off in 1971, Gadd adopted the new stage name Gary Glitter, which he devised by playing alliteratively with letters of the alphabet, working backwards from Z. Other options included Terry Tinsel, Stanley Sparkle and Vicky Vomit.

The song that made Gary Glitter's name began as a 15-minute jam session; whittled down to a pair of three-minute extracts it was released in 1972 as the A-side and B-side of a single called "Rock and Roll, Parts 1 and 2". Part 2 proved to be the more popular side in many countries, although it took about six months before it made its full impact, going to No. 2 on the UK Singles Chart and reaching the Top Ten in the United States, one of the few British glam rock records to do so. "Rock and Roll Part 1" was also a hit: in France it made number one, and in the UK both sides were listed together on the charts.

=== Mainstream success ===
"Rock and Roll" was followed by other successes over the next three years. Glitter, backed by the Glittermen/the Glitter Band on stage, competed with David Bowie, Elton John, Sweet, Slade and T. Rex for domination of the charts. To reinforce his image, he reportedly owned 30 glitter suits and fifty pairs of silver platform boots. He also released several singles which became UK Top 10 hits, with "I'm the Leader of the Gang (I Am)" being his first single to reach the number-one position in the summer of 1973, and "I Love You Love Me Love", its follow-up, his second. Even an atypical ballad, "Remember Me This Way", went to No. 3. He had eleven consecutive Top 10 singles, from "Rock and Roll, Parts 1 and 2" in 1972 to "Doing Alright with the Boys" in the summer of 1975. "Rock and Roll (Part 2)" caught on as a popular sports anthem in North America.

Despite his success in the UK, Glitter never made the same impact in America where, at best, glam rock was seen as a curiosity. Glitter had one more entry on the US charts with "I Didn't Know I Loved You (Till I Saw You Rock and Roll)"; after that, the closest chart success for Glitter was a cover recording of "I'm the Leader of the Gang (I Am)" by Brownsville Station.

After "Doing Alright with the Boys", Glitter won the award for Best Male Artist at the Saturday Scene music awards hosted by LWT. His next release was a cover of the Rivingtons' novelty nonsensical doo-wop song "Papa-Oom-Mow-Mow", but it got no higher than No. 38 on the British charts. After subsequent releases stalled in similar fashion, Glitter announced his retirement from the music industry to start a family life with his new partner in early 1976. That same year, his first hits package, simply titled Greatest Hits, was released. It entered the UK Top 40 best-seller charts. A similar budget album, entitled I Love You Love Me Love, was issued by Hallmark Entertainment the following year.

=== Comeback and business interests ===
In 1976, Glitter faced declining record sales. He took a two-year-long exile, living in France and Australia, before returning to the UK, and beginning his comeback.

Glitter's career took a downturn towards the end of the 1970s, leading him to declare bankruptcy in 1977, though he later blamed the high tax rate in the UK at the time. He entered bankruptcy a second time over unpaid tax in the 1990s. Under financial pressure, not even a pair of Top 40 hit singles ("It Takes All Night Long" and "A Little Boogie Woogie in the Back of My Mind") could lift him all the way back. It took the post-punk audience, and some of its artists who still respected Glitter's work, to do that; he had been an influence on post-punk, new wave, Britpop and glam metal, as well as early punk rock itself. Around this time, Glitter settled into being a performer with a niche following that continued until his conviction for downloading child pornography in 1999. This helped provide the opportunity for Glitter to cut a dance medley of his greatest hits, "All That Glitters", which charted in 1981. Within three years he was playing 80 shows a year at colleges and nightclubs, and had chart hits "Dance Me Up" (UK No. 25) and "Another Rock and Roll Christmas" (UK No. 7 and one of the most played Christmas songs of all time).

Glitter's comeback was boosted in the 1980s by various guest spots and collaborations. In 1982, he appeared on the British Electric Foundation album Music of Quality and Distinction Volume One (UK No. 25) along with fellow pop/rock luminaries Sandie Shaw and Tina Turner. In 1988, the Timelords' "Doctoring the Tardis", a Doctor Who tribute that sampled "Rock and Roll (Part 2)", reached the number-one spot. In due course, Glitter re-cut "Rock and Roll" with producer Trevor Horn and also "I'm the Leader of the Gang (I Am)" with Girlschool. In the late 1980s, his hit singles were used to compile the Telstar-released C'mon... C'mon – The Gary Glitter Party Album. In 1989, Jive Bunny and the Mastermixers put a large sample of "Another Rock and Roll Christmas" on their number-one UK hit "Let's Party". In 1987 Glitter received a ten-year driving ban and narrowly escaped imprisonment after a third conviction for drink-driving.

During the 1980s Glitter became a Buddhist and a vegetarian. He opened a restaurant near Leicester Square in 1991, with Gary's Glitter Bar being promoted under the slogan "Leader of the Snack", but the restaurant closed a few years later. Glitter also launched his own record label in the early 1990s, Attitude Records, after he lost his deal with Virgin Records. He had signed to Virgin after leaving Arista Records in 1984 after twelve years with the label. Attitude Records was merged into Machmain Ltd later in the 1990s, a music company owned by Glitter.

Glitter spent the next decade mostly as an in-demand live performer, and his back catalogue of recordings proved durable enough for several compilations to be successfully released. He appeared in billboard and poster advertisements for British Rail, in one of which he was shown attempting to look younger to obtain a Young Person's Railcard. He also released a new studio album, Leader II, in 1991.

The Leader, his best-selling autobiography, was published in 1991. He was the subject of an episode of This is Your Life in 1992. During the episode, Glitter's friend Tessa Dahl said: "Gary actually came to live in my house when he was between jobs ... My sister Lucy turned it into quite a successful venture because she used to pack the train full of her adolescent school friends in school uniforms and then skive school. And she'd bring them up to the house and charge them five pounds a head to come and gaze at Glitter." Glitter can be seen putting his fingers to his lips and telling Dahl to "shush" as Dahl begins to talk about the adolescent girls.

He was a surprise hit at the 1994 FIFA World Cup concert in Chicago, which was telecast live to forty-six countries. He played the Godfather in the 1996 revival tour of the Who's Quadrophenia. He also released a new single, a cover version of "The House of the Rising Sun". The English rock band Oasis interpolated a line from Glitter's 1973 chart hit "Hello, Hello, I'm Back Again" on "Hello", the first track on their 1995 multi-million-selling album (What's the Story) Morning Glory?; this meant he was legally credited as a co-writer.

=== Career moves since 2001 ===
In September 2001, he released a new studio album, On, which included material written before his 1999 British conviction. That material was to have been part of a project called Lost on Life Street until that album's release was cancelled following his arrest. By December 2004, after releasing a new single, "Control", Glitter was in the news again concerning his behaviour; non-governmental organisations (NGOs) had been petitioning the government with their own evidence aimed at arresting Glitter. He moved to Vietnam.

In 2002, Snapper Music re-promoted The Ultimate Gary Glitter – 25 Years of Hits, a two-disc compilation album of Glitter's music initially released in 1997, days after his arrest, which covers his commercial breakthrough in 1972 through to 1984 while also including a song that was later released on On, and singles by his former backing band the Glitter Band without him; again it was moderately successful.

In 2005 Remember Me This Way, the documentary filmed at Glitter's career peak in 1973 (and originally released in 1974), was issued for the first time on DVD. Glitter's music itself still had an audience, further demonstrated by three new album releases, although all of them contained past recordings from the vaults, rather than new product. The first two new albums were issued at the same time, The Remixes and Live in Concert (the latter of which was a 1981 recording). These were only for sale on the Internet. A new collection of Glitter's chart hit singles followed, The Best of Gary Glitter. In 2006 his back catalogue was made available via the Internet from sites such as iTunes and eMusic.

In 2011, a collection of hits and B-sides was issued under the title All that Glitters.

News reports stated that, as of late July 2013, Glitter may have earned a total of £1,000,000 from royalties derived from the Oasis song "Hello" that sampled "Hello, Hello, I'm Back Again". Music industry lawyer Craig Brookes cited this monetary sum in addition to the royalties from his back catalogue of songs—£300,000 a year or more—and the estimated £200,000 Glitter was awarded for copyright infringement after he enacted legal action against Oasis in 1999. In 2014, Billboard reported that "Rock and Roll Part 2", co-written by Glitter with Mike Leander, was earning an estimated $250,000 a year in royalties due to its use in the NHL.

In October 2019 there was controversy over the use of "Rock and Roll Part 2" in the commercially successful film Joker due to the possibility of Glitter, as co-writer and performer of the song, receiving a lump sum and royalties for its use. According to the Los Angeles Times, Glitter does not receive payment when the song is used as he has sold the rights, and the US rights to the song are now owned by Universal Music Publishing Group. The song charted in the US in October 2019.

== Concert tours and live performances ==
In 1973, Glitter appeared at the London Palladium. It was a sell-out concert. In the same year his performance at the Rainbow Theatre was recorded and released as a live album, Remember Me This Way.

During his comeback period of the 1980s, he did fewer tours, and mainly toured Britain. He did shows in Ireland, Germany, France, America and Bahrain. During the 1990s, he toured America several times, finally gaining the significant popularity he sought in the 1970s. His final tour, entitled "A Night Out with the Boys: Could This Be for the Last Time?" took place in 1997. In 2005, Glitter had been living in Vietnam without the knowledge of the authorities. His presence there only came to their attention after he had offered to sing in local bars in Vũng Tàu.

== Influence on other musicians ==
Glitter had an influence on various musicians and genres from the 1970s onwards, especially British punk, post-punk, new wave, gothic rock, Britpop and glam metal.

- Mark E. Smith, frontman of the Fall, was a Glitter fan. Speaking to NME in 1993, he said: "I was really into Gary Glitter, and I used to get bad-mouthed for it. It was like 'You've got to be into David Bowie or Yes – Gary Glitter's just tripe'. And I was going 'It's fuckin' great. It's avant-garde... Well, two drummers and all that – it was really percussive. It was the only decent thing around".
- CeeLo Green has been influenced by Glitter's music. He told NME in 2014, "I'm very aware of the crimes (Glitter) committed so I would not like to have this misconstrued. But I appreciate the musical contribution and (what he did) sonically."
- Freddie Mercury recorded a single using the pseudonym Larry Lurex, a name apparently influenced by the name "Gary Glitter".
- John Eddie was inspired by Glitter and described his first single "Jungle Boy" as "Gary Glitter meets Elvis Presley".
- Joan Jett was inspired by Glitter's early 1970s output, and has covered his song "Do You Wanna Touch Me". Jett also covered Glitter's 1975 hit "Doing Alright with the Boys".
- Gothic rock band the Sisters of Mercy have cited Glitter as an influence.

== Personal life ==
Gadd married Ann Murton in July 1963. They had a son, born in 1964, and a daughter, born in 1966, before divorcing in 1972. In February 2001, he had another son with his Cuban girlfriend Yudenia Sosa Martínez, with whom he was living in Cuba. He had homes in London and Wedmore at the time of his arrest in 1997.

On 20 January 2008, the News of the World reported that Glitter had suffered a severe heart attack. These reports were denied, although it was confirmed that he had been diagnosed with heart problems. Nguyễn Hữu Quang (the director of the hospital in Bình Thuận near the prison where Glitter was serving his sentence) said, "Glitter was admitted to our hospital with acute diarrhea. While we were treating him, we found out that he also has a cardiovascular disorder."

== Sexual offences ==
=== 1997 arrest and 1999 conviction ===
In November 1997, Gadd was arrested after a technician discovered pornographic images of children on the hard drive of a laptop that he had taken to a computer retailer in Bristol to be repaired. Further images were discovered by police during searches of his homes in London and Wedmore. He was castigated in the media over the allegations; additionally, his appearance in the Spice Girls' musical comedy film Spice World was cut, though a truncated edit of the scene, featuring a cover of "I'm the Leader of the Gang (I Am)", was retained.

At Bristol Crown Court on 12 November 1999, Mr Justice Butterfield sentenced Gadd to four months in prison and placed him on the sex offender register in the UK after he admitted downloading more than 4,000 items of child pornography. He was acquitted of a charge of having sex with a 14-year-old girl with whom he had a relationship in the late 1970s. It was later revealed that the complainant sold her story to the News of the World and stood to earn more money from the newspaper should Gadd be convicted.

Following his release in January 2000, Gadd decided to leave the UK, where he had become a "public hate figure", and fled on his yacht to Spain. He lived at Sotogrande in Andalusia for six months on his yacht, which was moored at the marina. He told the locals that his name was Larry Brilliante and spent his time frequenting local bars and surfing the Internet. After his real identity became known in Sotogrande, he moved to Cuba and later to Cambodia, where he rented an apartment in Phnom Penh. In late 2002, he was detained over his previous sex offences and spent four days in jail before being released on bail. In January 2003, he was deported from Cambodia to Thailand on a flight to Bangkok. He subsequently settled in Vietnam.

=== Conviction and release in Vietnam ===
From March 2005, Gadd resided in Vũng Tàu, Vietnam, where he rented a luxury seaside villa and applied for permanent Vietnamese residency. He came to the attention of Vietnamese authorities after being banned from a nightclub for allegedly groping a teenage waitress; eyewitnesses also reported seeing him take two young girls into his home. On 12 November 2005, he fled his home. A 15-year-old girl was found living in his flat and was questioned by authorities. Police began searching for Gadd, and he was arrested on 20 November at Tân Sơn Nhất International Airport in Ho Chi Minh City while trying to board a flight to Bangkok. Six Vietnamese girls and women, aged from 11 to 23, claimed that Gadd had had sex with them.

After his arrest, Gadd was turned over to provincial police from Bà Rịa–Vũng Tàu, returned to Vũng Tàu, and held on suspicion of having sex with the two underage girls. Gadd was held in jail throughout the criminal investigation, which was completed on 26 December 2005. The charge of rape was dropped for "lack of evidence" (according to Gadd's lawyer), although Gadd admitted that an 11-year-old girl had slept in his bed. Gadd could have faced execution by firing squad had he been convicted of child rape. After having received compensatory payments from Gadd, the families of the girls appealed for clemency for him.

On 2 March 2006, Gadd was tried on charges of committing obscene acts with two girls, aged 10 and 11, facing up to 14 years in prison if convicted. The following day, he was found guilty and sentenced to three years in prison. The sentence included mandatory deportation at the end of his sentence, and payment of five million Vietnamese đồng (US$315) to his victims' families. Judge Hoàng Thanh Tùng said: "He sexually abused and committed obscene acts with children many times in a disgusting and sick manner." Gadd continued to deny any wrongdoing, claiming to have been framed by British tabloid newspapers.

In an interview with BBC News in May 2006, Gadd denied that he was a paedophile and claimed not to have knowingly had sex with anyone under 18. He said that he had hoped to put his life back on track and have a career after he left prison in England. He continued to blame the press for his downfall and called them "the worst enemy in the world", alleging that they had paid girls in a bar to arrange a photo scoop. Gadd did not comment about his previous conviction for downloading child pornography several years earlier. Christine Beddoe, director of End Child Prostitution, Pornography and Trafficking, criticised Gadd and said that he was trying to "minimise what he has done ... We must allow children to tell their story and not just have the words of Gadd."

On 15 June 2006, in a closed hearing, a three-judge panel of the Supreme People's Court of Vietnam heard Gadd's appeal for a reduced sentence. The appeal was rejected four weeks later. Although he was calm throughout the 40-minute reading of the verdict, upon leaving the courthouse, Gadd shouted angrily to reporters and denounced Vietnamese justice for not hearing the defence arguments. On 7 February 2007, his sentence was reduced by three months. In anticipation of his release, the Philippines barred Gadd from entering that country as of 16 May 2008.

Gadd served his sentence in Thủ Đức Prison in southern Bình Thuận province. He shared a cell with 18 other foreign inmates and was exempted from hard labour because of his age. In 2007, he suffered from high blood pressure, and was put on medication and told to stop buying beer from the prison canteen. In January 2008, after being taken to a prison clinic for treatment of intestinal problems, tests showed that Gadd also had an irregular heartbeat. Later that month, he suffered a heart attack and collapsed in his cell. He was taken to a hospital in Phan Thiết, where he was kept under police guard. He was visited in hospital by officials from the British embassy.

Gadd's Vietnamese lawyer, Lê Thành Kinh, said that his client intended to return to the UK, although he had also expressed interest in moving to either Hong Kong or Singapore. In the UK, it was reported that he would be placed on the Sex Offenders Register on his return. British Home Secretary Jacqui Smith said that Gadd should be given a Foreign Travel Order (FTO) banning him from overseas travel: "We need to control him, and he will be [controlled] once he returns to this country."

Gadd was released on 19 August 2008. He was escorted under police guard to Tân Sơn Nhất International Airport in Ho Chi Minh City and put on a flight to London via Bangkok. In Bangkok, he claimed that he had tinnitus and a heart condition and refused to board the flight to London despite the efforts of British police sent to escort him, although they had no jurisdiction to take action. A doctor attending to him airside diagnosed Gadd with costochondritis, prescribed him painkillers, and declared him fit for travel. Gadd continued to refuse to leave. He booked himself into a transit lounge room and claimed he was a "free man". He was refused admission to Thailand as a threat to domestic morality. Thai immigration officials gave him a deadline to leave the country, and warned that he would be detained and deported to the UK if he did not leave voluntarily.

On the evening of 20 August, Gadd took a flight to Hong Kong, where he requested medical treatment, claiming that he was suffering a heart attack. The Hong Kong authorities also refused to admit him and he returned to Thailand the next day.

At least 19 countries, including Cuba, Cambodia, and the Philippines, announced that they would refuse entry to Gadd, and on 21 August the Thai authorities stated that he had agreed to return to the UK. On 22 August 2008 he arrived at Heathrow Airport, where he was met by British police officers.

On his return to the UK, Gadd was added to the Sex Offenders Register for life; he stated an intention to appeal against the decision, but on 16 January 2009 it was announced that he had abandoned the appeal.

On 25 June 2008, The Daily Telegraph reported that Gadd planned to record a new album after his prison release. He was quoted as saying: "I have an incomplete album that I want to finish. I have been thinking about the plan during my days in jail. I have sung rock 'n' roll for 40 years. After jail, I will continue to rock 'n' roll."

=== Jimmy Savile scandal, 2015 conviction; 2023 release and reimprisonment ===
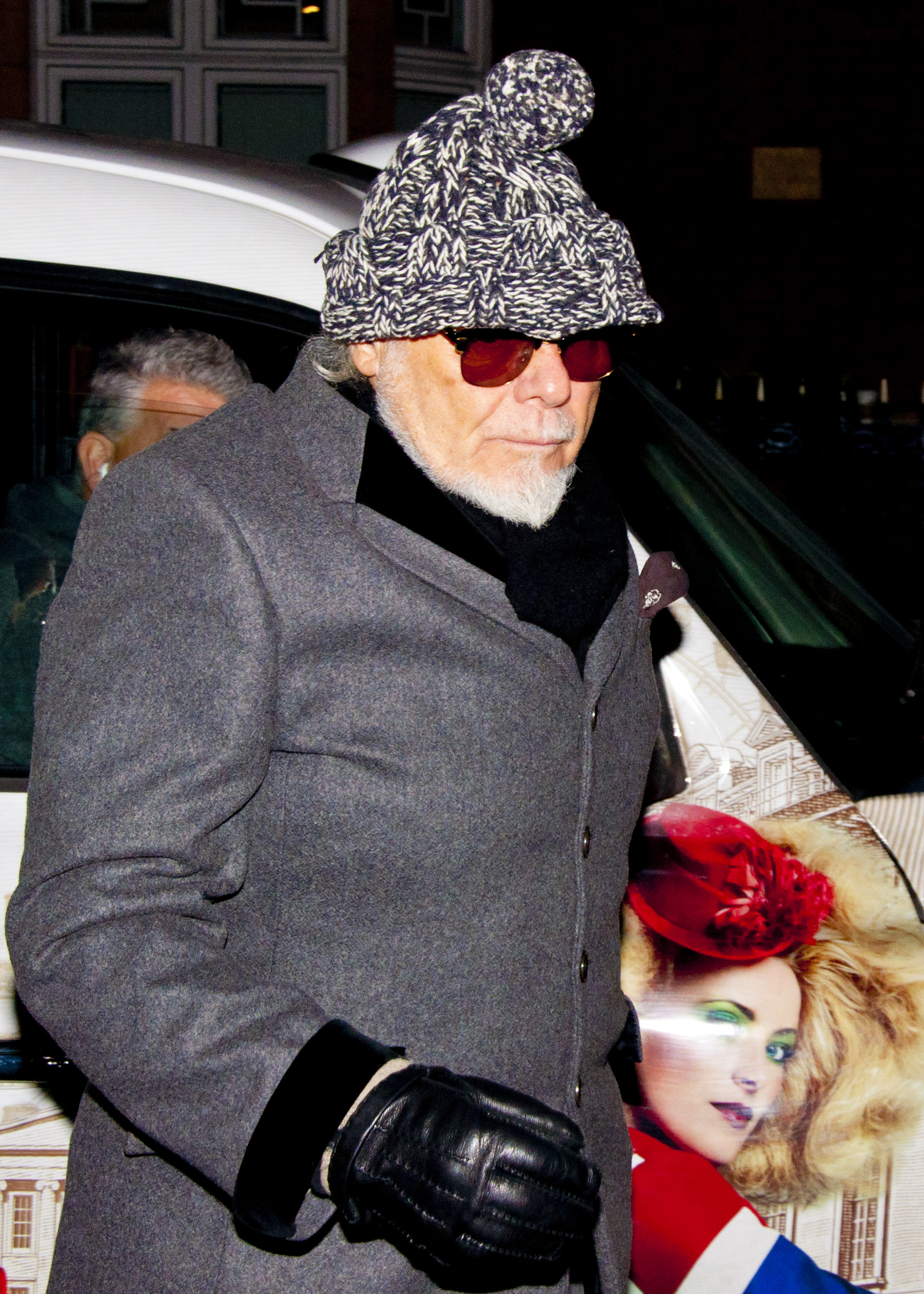
Gadd in 2012

In October 2012, ITV aired the documentary The Other Side of Jimmy Savile in its Exposure strand, which detailed revelations of sexual misconduct surrounding Jimmy Savile, who had died the previous year. Accounts included an accusation against Gadd, who was alleged to have raped a 13- or 14-year-old girl in Savile's BBC dressing room. On 28 October, Gadd was arrested and questioned by police in London as part of Operation Yewtree. Gadd was released on police bail until the middle of December and was bailed again until February. On 5 June 2014, Gadd was charged with eight counts of sexual offences committed against two girls aged 12 to 14 between 1977 and 1980. From October 2014, his performances on Top of the Pops were no longer shown by the BBC.

On 19 January 2015, Gadd appeared at Southwark Crown Court accused of seven counts of indecent assault, one count of attempted rape, and two other sexual offences against three girls between 1975 and 1980. He was accused of sexually assaulting two girls aged 12 and 13 after inviting them backstage to his dressing room and attempting to rape a girl under the age of 10 after having crept into her bed. The trial lasted two and a half weeks.

On 5 February 2015, Gadd was convicted of attempted rape, four counts of indecent assault, and one of having sex with a girl under the age of 13. He was acquitted of the three other counts. He was remanded in custody at HM Prison Wandsworth prior to his sentencing. On 27 February 2015, Judge Alistair McCreath sentenced Gadd to 16 years in prison.

In May 2015, Gadd began an appeal against his convictions. On 17 November 2015, Gadd's appeal was denied by the Court of Appeal, which ruled that there was nothing unsafe about the conviction. From 2015 to 2018 Gadd was incarcerated at HM Prison Albany. In 2018 he was transferred to HM Prison The Verne, a lower-security prison. On 3 February 2023, he was released on licence after serving half of his sentence, due to the sentencing guidelines in place at the time of the historic offences. On 13 March 2023, after an investigation into his use of a smartphone, Gadd was recalled to prison for breaching his licence conditions by allegedly enquiring how to access the dark web.

On 7 February 2024, it was announced that Gadd's appeal for parole had been turned down by the Parole Board who said: "It found on the evidence that at the time of the offending, and while he was on licence, Mr Gadd had a sexual interest in underage girls."

In March 2024, it was reported that he was being incarcerated at HM Prison Risley. On 11 June 2024, a High Court judge, Mrs Justice Tipples, ruled that Gadd must pay £508,000 to a victim he abused when she was 12 years old. In March 2025, Gadd was declared bankrupt after failing to pay the £508,000. On 17 June 2025, his bid for release was refused, with officials citing ongoing concerns about his behaviour and risk assessment.

=== 2026 charges ===
In July 2026, Gadd was charged with unlawful sexual intercourse with a girl under the age of 13 and indecent assault on the same girl when under the age of 14 dating back to 1978–81. At the time of being charged he was held at HM Prison Channings Wood in Devon. Gadd appeared in court for the first time in connection with the new charges on 5 August 2026. On 2 September 2026, Gadd pleaded not guilty to the new charges.

== Discography ==
=== Studio albums ===
- Glitter (1972)
- Touch Me (1973)
- G. G. (1975)
- Silver Star (1977)
- Boys Will Be Boys (1984)
- Leader II (1991)
- On (2001)

== Books ==
- Glitter, Gary with Lloyd Bradley (1991), Leader: The Autobiography of Gary Glitter, Ebury Press, ISBN 0-85223-977-7
- Anon. (1976), Gary Glitter Annual 1976, Jarrold & Sons, ISBN 978-0-72350-341-5
- Anon. (1975), Gary Glitter Annual 1975, World Distributors Ltd., ISBN 978-0-7235-0284-5

== See also ==
- Byrd Dickens
- Child sexual abuse in the United Kingdom
- The Execution of Gary Glitter
