= I Love You Love Me Love =

Single by Gary Glitter
- B-side: "Hands Up! It's a Stick Up"
- Released: November 1973
- Genre: Glam rock
- Length: 3:15
- Label: Bell
- Songwriters: Gary Glitter; Mike Leander
- Producer: Mike Leander

Gary Glitter singles chronology
"I'm the Leader of the Gang (I Am)" (1973)	"I Love You Love Me Love" (1973)	"Remember Me This Way" (1974)

"I Love You Love Me Love" is a song by the English glam rock singer Gary Glitter. Written by Glitter with Mike Leander and produced by Leander (unusually in monophonic sound), "I Love You Love Me Love" was Glitter's second number-one single on the UK Singles Chart, spending four weeks at the top of the chart in November 1973, and establishing itself as one of the top 10 best-selling singles of 1973 in the UK. It reached No. 2 in both Ireland and Australia.

== Track listing ==
1. "I Love You Love Me Love" – 3:15
2. "Hands Up! It's a Stick Up" – 3:05

== Cover versions ==
- It was covered by Tommy James in 1976.
- Joan Jett and the Blackhearts recorded it in 1984 for the studio album Glorious Results of a Misspent Youth, released as a single backed by the non-album song "Bird Dog" (12"), and 7" releases with "Talkin' 'Bout My Baby (Live)" or LP track "Long Time", depending on the country of origin.

== Charts ==
It is Glitter's most successful entry in the UK Singles Chart (it entered the chart at number-one and had a 14-week run in the Top 40), earning him the first platinum record (which at the time certified sales of 1 million copies) awarded to a British artist. By November 2012 it had sold 1.14 million copies in the UK.

=== Weekly charts ===
Chart (1973–1974)	Peak position
Australia (Kent Music Report)	2
Ireland (IRMA)	2
United Kingdom (OCC)	1

=== Year-end charts ===
Year-end chart performance
Chart (1974)	Position
Australia (Kent Music Report)	19

== Certification ==
Region	Certification	Certified units/sales
United Kingdom (BPI)	Platinum	1,140,000
