= Mike Leander =

British musical artist (1941–1996)

- Born: Michael George Farr; 30 June 1941; Walthamstow, Essex, England
- Died: 18 April 1996 (aged 54) London, England
- Education: Bancroft's School
- Genres: Pop; rock; glam rock; rock and roll
- Occupations: Arranger; record producer; songwriter
- Years active: 1963–1996
- Labels: Bell; Decca; Atlantic; MCA; Arista

Michael George Farr (30 June 1941 – 18 April 1996), known professionally as Mike Leander, was an English arranger, songwriter and record producer.

He worked variously with Cliff Richard, the Beatles, David McWilliams ("Days of Pearly Spencer"), Gary Glitter, the Rolling Stones, Brian Jones, Marianne Faithfull, Andrew Loog Oldham, Joe Cocker, Billy Fury, Marc Bolan, Small Faces, Van Morrison, Alan Price, Peter Frampton, Keith Richards, Shirley Bassey, Lulu, Jimmy Page, Roy Orbison, Ben E. King, the Drifters, and Gene Pitney. Leander also wrote the score for the films Privilege (1967) and Run a Crooked Mile (1969).

== Early life ==
Born on 30 June 1941 in Walthamstow, East London, Leander won a scholarship to Bancroft's School in Woodford Green, Essex where he was educated from 1952 until 1959.

== Career ==
Mike Leander started his career as an arranger with Decca Records in 1963 and worked with such musicians as Marianne Faithfull, Billy Fury, Marc Bolan, Joe Cocker, the Small Faces, Van Morrison, Alan Price, Peter Frampton, Keith Richards, Shirley Bassey, Lulu, Jimmy Page, Roy Orbison, Brian Jones, Paul Jones and Gene Pitney. He is perhaps best known as co-writer and producer for Gary Glitter in the 1970s and 1980s.

Mike Leander worked as a producer and arranger with Ben E. King and the Drifters on the Atlantic record label. He was later requested by Paul McCartney to arrange the Beatles' "She's Leaving Home" from the Sgt. Pepper's Lonely Hearts Club Band album, as the Beatles' staple producer and arranger, George Martin, was unavailable at the time. Leander thus became the only orchestral arranger other than Martin to work on the recording of a Beatles basic track.

He was executive producer of the Andrew Lloyd Webber and Tim Rice concept album Jesus Christ Superstar and in the late 1960s wrote scores for several films, including Privilege with Paul Jones and Jean Shrimpton, Run a Crooked Mile with Mary Tyler Moore and Louis Jourdan and The Adding Machine with Billie Whitelaw and Milo O'Shea. Privilege featured the song "I've Been a Bad, Bad Boy", which he wrote and was performed by Paul Jones. It was a number 5 hit in the UK and charted well in several other countries.

Leander first worked with singer "Paul Raven" (born Paul Francis Gadd) in 1968 and produced various singles for him on MCA Records (now Universal Music Group) and this led to Raven's part on Jesus Christ Superstar. "Raven" later became Gary Glitter and the two began an on/off working relationship that would last until Leander's death. The partnership produced a string of glam rock hits, most of which Leander co-wrote with Glitter, beginning in 1972 with "Rock and Roll, Parts 1 and 2", which reached No. 2 in the UK Singles Chart, No. 1 in France and also the top 10 in many other countries including the US. This was followed by 11 more Top 10 UK singles, including three UK chart-toppers, "I'm the Leader of the Gang (I Am)" (1973), "I Love You Love Me Love" (1973) and "Always Yours" (1974). Leander was the producer on four of Gary Glitter's studio albums, Glitter (1972), Touch Me (1973), Silver Star (1977) and Boys Will Be Boys (1984), as well as producing Glitter's live album Remember Me This Way (1974). Leander also produced the singles and albums that were recorded in the studio by the Glitter Band from 1974 to 1977.

In the 1980s, Leander wrote the musical Matador, which gave Tom Jones a hit album and single, A Boy from Nowhere.

== Personal life ==
Leander married Penny Carter (b. 1947) in 1974 and they had two children. They were together until his death from cancer in 1996.
