= Hello (band) =

English rock band

- Origin: England
- Genres: Glam rock
- Years active: 1971–1979; 2002–2025
- Labels: Bell; Arista; Polydor
- Past members: Bob Bradbury; Simon Ellis; Corrie Shiells; Keith Marshall; Vic Faulkner; Jeff Allen; Jake Bradbury
- Website: helloband.co.uk

Hello were an English glam rock band.

The band's biggest success was in the UK and Germany in the mid-1970s, when their top 10 hits in the UK Singles Chart were "Tell Him" and "New York Groove".

== Career ==
The core members of Hello came together around 1969, originally being called The Age. The band was started by Bob Bradbury, previously of The Flashback Berries, with Keith Marshall, Vic Faulkner, and Jeff Allen (brother of Chris Allen, alias Chris Cross of Ultravox). For about a year, they backed singer Caroline Hall, before renaming themselves as Hello in 1971. The group recorded "You Move Me" and "C'mon" in 1972 as well as "Another School Day" in 1973, all on Bell Records, but these were not hits.

Their biggest success came in the UK and Germany in 1974 and 1975. Their top 10 hits in the UK Singles Chart were "Tell Him" (a cover of The Exciters 1963 hit) and "New York Groove", the latter of which was written by Argent band member Russ Ballard. "New York Groove" was later covered to provide a solo Billboard Hot 100 chart hit in the United States, for the rock guitarist Ace Frehley of the band Kiss. In Germany, Hello's subsequent singles "Star Studded Sham" (another Ballard composition) and "Love Stealer" reached the top 20, but failed to chart in the UK where glam rock had largely fallen out of favour.

Hello appeared in the 1975 film Side by Side. Their first album, titled Keeps Us Off the Streets, was soon released.

However, by 1979, with no recording contract, the band split up. Former guitarist Keith Marshall released a solo single two years later, titled "Only Crying". It charted internationally. Bassist Vic Faulkner reappeared in the 2000s and released several albums. He later lived in Spain.

On 22 October 1999, Bob Bradbury appeared on the Identity Parade on the BBC Television programme Never Mind the Buzzcocks. According to the band's official website, in 2002, their original lead singer and rhythm guitarist Bradbury reformed the band with him as the sole remaining founding member.

== Discography ==
=== Albums ===
- Keeps Us Off the Streets (1976)
- Shine On Silver Light (1977)
- Hello Again (1978)
- Glam Rockers (1996)
- New York Groove (1999)
- The Glam Singles Collection (2001)
- Live (2013)

=== Singles ===
List of singles, with various territories' chart positions
Year	Title	B-side	Peak chart positions			
Year	Title	B-side	UK	AUS	GER	IRE
1972	"You Move Me"	"Ask Your Mama"				
1972	"C'mon"	"The Wench"				
1973	"Another School Day"	"C'mon Get Together"				
1974	"Tell Him"	"Lightning"	6	36	32	12
1975	"Game's Up"	"Do It All Night"	53 (Note: Chart position is from the official UK "Breakers List".)		28	
1975	"Bend Me, Shape Me"	"We Gotta Go"	58		49	
1975	"New York Groove"	"Little Miss Mystery"	9		7	6
1976	"Star Studded Sham"	"Jenny Dream"			16	
1976	"Teenage Revolution"	"Keeps Us Off the Street"				
1976	"Love Stealer"	"Out Of Our Heads"			17	
1976	"Seven Rainy Days"	"Rebel"			44	
1977	"Let It Rock"	"Another School Day"			24	
1977	"Shine On Silver Light"	"Gotta Lotta Soul"				
1977	"Good Old USA"	"Midnight Strangers"			37	
1977	"Heart Get Ready for Love"	"Voodoo Eyes"				
1977	"Slow Motion"	"The In Place"				
1978	"Hi Ho Silver Lining"	"Too Much Hesitating"				
1979	"Feel This Thing"	"Back Seat Talking"				
2016	"Way Beyond" (CD)	a) "Santa Rock" b) "Wanna See"				

== List of songs ==
The following is a sortable table of all songs by Hello:

In the Song column, bold means released as a single.

Song	Writer(s)	Time	Producer	Album	Year	Other
"20th Century Boy"	Marc Bolan	3:37	unknown	Glam Rockers	1996	
"99 Ways"	Keith Marshall	2:28	Colin Frechter, Bill Kimber, John Hudson, Mike Hurst	Hello Again (LP)	1978	
"All the Young Dudes"	David Bowie	4:52	unknown	Glam Rockers	1996	
**"Another School Day"**	Jeff Allen, Bob Bradbury, Keith Marshall	2:54	Mike Leander	Keeps Us Off the Streets (LP)	1973	A-side of "C'mon Get Together"
"Another School Day"	Jeff Allen, Bob Bradbury, Keith Marshall	2:50	Mike Leander	Keeps Us Off the Streets (LP)	1977	B-side of "Let It Rock"
"Ask Your Mama"	Russ Ballard	2:40	Russ Ballard	The Singles A's & B's Vol. 1	1972	B-side of "You Move Me"
"Back Seat Talking"	Jeff Allen	3:08	Colin Frechter, Bill Kimber	Hello Again (LP)	1979	B-side of "Feel This Thing"
"Bad Bad Boy"	McCafferty, Sweet, Agnew, Charlton	2:45	unknown	Glam Rockers	1996	
**"Bend Me, Shape Me"**	Scott English, Larry Weiss	2:36	Mike Leander	Their Greatest Hits	1975	A-side of "We Gotta Go"
"C'mon"	Russ Ballard	2:36	Ritchie Gold, Nick Kinsey	The Glam Years 1971–1979	1972	A-side of "The Wench"
"C'mon Get Together"	Jeff Allen, Bob Bradbury, Keith Marshall	2:53	Mike Leander	The Singles A's & B's Vol. 1	1973	B-side of "Another School Day"
"Can't Let You Go"		2:23		The Albums	2016	
"Carol"	Chuck Berry	3:49	Mike Leander	Keeps Us Off the Streets (LP)	1976	
"Dean"		3:16		The Glam Years 1971–1979	1988	
"Do It All Night"	Allen, Bradbury, Marshall	2:57	Mike Leander	The Singles A's & B's Vol. 1	1975	B-side of "Games Up"
"Dyna-mite"	Mike Chapman, Nicky Chinn	2:56		Keeps Us Off the Streets (CD)	2007	
"Elenore"	Howard Kaylan/Mark Volman/Jim Pons/Al Nichol/John Barbata	2:55	Colin Frechter, Bill Kimber, John Hudson, Mike Hurst	Hello Again (LP)	1978	
**"Feel This Thing"** (Radio Version)	Jeff Allen, Chris Allen	3:15	John Hudson	Hello Again (CD)	1979	A-side of "Back Seat Talking"
**"Feel This Thing"** (12" Version)	Jeff Allen, Chris Allen	4:45	John Hudson	Hello Again (CD)	1979	A-side of "Back Seat Talking"
**"Games Up"**	Shephard, Springate, Sego	2:52	Mike Leander	Their Greatest Hits	1975	A-side of "Do It All Night"
"Game's Up (live)"	Shephard, Springate, Sego	3:35	unknown	Glam Rockers	1996	
**"Good Old USA"**	Chris Allen, Jeff Allen	3:00	Colin Frechter, Bill Kimber	Their Greatest Hits	1977	A-side of "Midnight Strangers"
"Gotta Lotta Soul"	Jeff Allen	2:45	Colin Frechter, Bill Kimber	Shine On Silver Light	1977	B-side of "Shine On Silver Light"
**"Heart Get Ready For Love"**	Bugatti, Musker	3:09	Colin Frechter, Bill Kimber	Shine On Silver Light	1977	A-side of "Voodoo Eyes"
"Hi Ho Silver Lining"	Scott English, Larry Weiss	3:18	John Hudson	Hello Again	1978	A-side of "Too Much Hesitating"
"Hold Me"	Little Jack Little, David Oppenheim, Ira Schuster	2:48	Mike Leander	Keeps Us Off the Streets (LP)	1976	
"Hooray, Hooray"	Bradbury, Allen, Marshall	4:06		Keeps Us Off the Streets (CD)	2007	
"How To Survive The Night"	Bob Bradbury	2:36	Colin Frechter, Bill Kimber, John Hudson, Mike Hurst	Hello Again (LP)	1978	
"I Didn't Know I Loved You (Till I Saw You Rock and Roll)"	Gary Glitter, Mike Leander	4:26	unknown	Glam Rockers	1996	
"I Love Rock 'n' Roll"	Alan Merrill, Jake Hooker	3:20	unknown	Glam Rockers	1996	
"Jenny Dream"	Allen, Allen, Marshall	2:47	John Hudson, Eddie Seago	The Singles A's & B's Vol. 1	1976	B-side of "Star Studded Sham"
"Keep Us Off the Streets"	Jeff Allen	2:59	Mike Leander	Keeps Us Off the Streets (LP)	1976	B-side of "Teenage Revolution"
"Keep Us Off the Streets" (demo)	Jeff Allen	2:48	Mike Leander	Hello – The Albums	1976	
**"Let It Rock"**	Russ Ballard	3:31	Russ Ballard	Keeps Us Off the Streets (CD)	1977	A-side of "Another School Day"
"Let's Spend the Night Together"	Mick Jagger, Keith Richards	3:46	Mike Leander	Keeps Us Off the Streets (LP)	1976	
"Let's Twist Again"	Kal Mann, Dave Appell	3:08		Keeps Us Off the Streets (CD)	2007	
"Lightning"	Allen, Bradbury, Marshall	2:55	Mike Leander	The Singles A's & B's Vol. 1	1974	B-side of "Tell Him"
"Little Miss Mystery"	Allen, Allen, Marshall	3:38	Mike Leander	The Singles A's & B's Vol. 1	1975	B-side of "New York Groove"
"Little Miss Mystery" (demo)	Allen, Allen, Marshall	3:23	Mike Leander	Hello – The Albums	1975	
**"Love Stealer"**	Phil Wainman, Richard Myhill	3:33	Phil Wainman	Their Greatest Hits	1976	A-side of "Out Of Our Heads"
"Machine-Gun Hustle"	Keith Marshall	3:11	Colin Frechter, Bill Kimber, John Hudson, Mike Hurst	Hello Again (LP)	1978	
"Megamix"		3:25		New York Groove	1998	
"Midnight Strangers"	Bob Bradbury	3:00	Colin Frechter, Bill Kimber	Shine On Silver Light	1977	B-side of "Good Old USA"
**"New York Groove"**	Russ Ballard	2:45	Mike Leander	Keeps Us Off the Streets (LP)	1975	A-side of "Little Miss Mystery"
"New York Groove" (demo)	Russ Ballard	2:54	Mike Leander	Hello – The Albums	1975	
"Groove 2 – New York Groove"	Russ Ballard	4:19	unknown	Glam Rockers	1996	
"Night Watcher"		3:18		Hello Again (CD)	2007	
"Oh Caroline"	Jeff Allen	3:27	Colin Frechter, Bill Kimber, John Hudson, Mike Hurst	Hello Again (LP)	1978	
"One by One"		2:56		Hello Again (CD)	2007	
"One More Stop To Heaven"	Jeff Allen	2:58	Colin Frechter, Bill Kimber, John Hudson, Mike Hurst	Hello Again (LP)	1978	
"Out Of Our Heads"	Chris Allen, Jeff Allen	3:05	Phil Wainman	The Singles A's & B's Vol. 2	1976	B-side of "Love Stealer"
"Round And Round"	Chuck Berry	4:47		Keeps Us Off the Streets (CD)	2007	
"Rebel"	Bob Bradbury	3:03	Richard Myhill	Keeps Us Off the Streets (CD)	1976	B-side of "Seven Rainy Days"
"Rebel Rebel"	David Bowie	4:04	unknown	Glam Rockers	1996	
"Rock On"	David Essex	3:42	unknown	Glam Rockers	1996	
"Santa Rock"					2016	
"School's Out"	Alice Cooper, Michael Bruce, Glen Buxton, Dennis Dunaway, Neal Smith	3:50	unknown	Glam Rockers	1996	
**"Seven Rainy Days"**	Chris Allen, Jeff Allen, Keith Marshall	3:03	Richard Myhill	Their Greatest Hits	1976	A-side of "Rebel"
"Shakin' All Over"	Frederick Heath	4:14	Mike Leander	Keeps Us Off the Streets (LP)	1976	
"She Knows"	Darryl Cotton, Steve Kipner, Michael Lloyd	2:45	Mike Leander	Keeps Us Off the Streets (LP)	1976	
**"Shine On Silver Light"**	Allen, Bradbury, Marshall	3:07	Shine On Silver Light	Colin Frechter, Bill Kimber	1977	A-side of "Gotta Lotta Soul"
"Shout It Out"	John Springate	2:54		Keeps Us Off the Streets (CD)	2007	
**"Slow Motion"**	Keith Marshall	3:06	Colin Frechter, Bill Kimber	Hello Again (CD)	1977	A-side of "The In Place"
"Some Kind of Magic"		3:33		Shine On Silver Light	1977	
**"Star Studded Sham"**	Russ Ballard	2:57	Mike Leander	Keeps Us Off the Streets (LP)	1976	A-side of "Jenny Dream"
"Starlight"				Shine On Silver Light	1977	
**"Teenage Revolution"**	Jeff Allen	2:39	Mike Leander	Keeps Us Off the Streets (LP)	1976	A-side of "Keep Us Off the Streets"
**"Tell Him"**	Bert Berns	3:07	Mike Leander	Keeps Us Off the Streets (LP)	1974	A-side of "Lightning"
"Tell Him (live)"	Bert Berns	4:04	unknown	Glam Rockers	1996	
"That's The Time"	Bob Bradbury	3:20	Colin Frechter, Bill Kimber, John Hudson, Mike Hurst	Hello Again (LP)	1978	
"The Cat is Wild"	Jeff Allen	2:32	Colin Frechter, Bill Kimber, John Hudson, Mike Hurst	Hello Again (LP)	1978	
"The Golden Age of Rock 'n' Roll"	Ian Hunter	4:58	unknown	Glam Rockers	1996	
"The In Place"	Jeff Allen	3:29	Colin Frechter, Bill Kimber	Shine On Silver Light	1977	B-side of "Slow Motion"
"The Wench"	Allen, Bradbury, Marshall	2:52	Ritchie Gold, Nick Kinsey	The Singles A's & B's Vol. 1	1972	B-side of "C'mon"
"Then She Kissed Me"	Jeff Barry, Ellie Greenwich, Phil Spector	3:41	Mike Leander	Keeps Us Off the Streets (LP)	1976	
"Till You've Been Kissed"		3:18		Shine On Silver Light	1977	
"Too Much Hesitating"	Bob Bradbury	3:25	John Hudson	Hello Again (CD)	1978	B-side of "Hi Ho Silver Lining"
"Touch Too Much"	Mike Chapman, Nicky Chinn	3:04	unknown	Glam Rockers	1996	
"Voodoo Eyes"	Keith Marshall	3:26	Colin Frechter, Bill Kimber	Their Greatest Hits	1977	B-side of "Heart Get Ready for Love"
"Walking Midnight"	Bob Bradbury	3:10	Colin Frechter, Bill Kimber, John Hudson, Mike Hurst	Hello Again (LP)	1978	
"Wanna See"					2016	
"Way Beyond"					2016	
"We Gotta Go"	Allen, Bradbury, Marshall	2:55	Mike Leander	The Singles A's & B's Vol. 1	1975	B-side of "Bend Me, Shape Me"
"Week-End Rendezvous"		3:06		Shine On Silver Light	1977	
"Where's The Party"	Bradbury, Allen, Marshall	2:44		Keeps Us Off the Streets (CD)	2007	
"Whole Lotta Woman"	Marvin Rainwater	3:17		The Glam Years 1971–1979	1988	
"You Got Class Babe"		2:08		Hello Again (CD)	2007	
**"You Move Me"**	Russ Ballard	2:52	Russ Ballard	The Glam Years 1971–1979	1972	A-side of "Ask Your Mama"
"You Shot Me Down"	Keith Marshall	3:26	Colin Frechter, Bill Kimber, John Hudson, Mike Hurst	Hello Again (LP)	1978	

=== Cover versions ===
Hello produced numerous cover versions. Their originals are:

Song	Writer(s)	Original artist	Album	Year	Other
"20th Century Boy"	Marc Bolan	T. Rex		1973	
"All the Young Dudes"	David Bowie	Mott the Hoople	All the Young Dudes	1972	
"Bad Bad Boy"	McCafferty, Sweet, Agnew, Charlton	Nazareth	Razamanaz	1973	
"Bend Me, Shape Me"	Scott English, Larry Weiss	The Outsiders	In	1967	
"Carol"	Chuck Berry	Chuck Berry	Berry Is on Top	1958	
"Elenore"	Howard Kaylan/Mark Volman/Jim Pons/Al Nichol/John Barbata	The Turtles	The Turtles Present the Battle of the Bands	1968	
"Hi Ho Silver Lining"	Scott English, Larry Weiss	The Attack	Magic In The Air	1967	
"Hold Me"	Little Jack Little, David Oppenheim, Ira Schuster	Little Jack Little		1933	
"I Didn't Know I Loved You (Till I Saw You Rock and Roll)"	Gary Glitter, Mike Leander	Gary Glitter	Glitter	1972	
"I Love Rock 'n' Roll"	Alan Merrill, Jake Hooker	Arrows		1975	
"Let's Spend the Night Together"	Mick Jagger, Keith Richards	The Rolling Stones	Between the Buttons (US)	1967	
"Let's Twist Again"	Kal Mann, Dave Appell	Chubby Checker	Let's Twist Again	1961	
"Rebel Rebel"	David Bowie	David Bowie	Diamond Dogs	1974	
"Rock On"	David Essex	David Essex	Rock On	1973	
"Round and Round"	Chuck Berry	Chuck Berry	Berry Is on Top	1958	
"School's Out"	Alice Cooper, Michael Bruce, Glen Buxton, Dennis Dunaway, Neal Smith	Alice Cooper	School's Out	1972	
"Shakin' All Over"	Frederick Heath	Johnny Kidd & the Pirates	The Johnny Kidd Memorial Album	1960	
"She Knows"	Darryl Cotton, Steve Kipner, Michael Lloyd	Friends	Friends	1973	
"Shout It Out"	John Springate	The Glitter Band	Hey	1974	
"Tell Him"	Bert Berns	Gil Hamilton aka Johnny Thunder	The Fabulous Johnny Thunder	1962	popularized by the Exciters
"The Golden Age of Rock 'n' Roll"	Ian Hunter	Mott the Hoople	The Hoople	1974	
"Then She Kissed Me"	Jeff Barry, Ellie Greenwich, Phil Spector	The Crystals	The Crystals Sing Their Greatest Hits	1963	
"Touch Too Much"	Mike Chapman, Nicky Chinn	Arrows		1974	
"Whole Lotta Woman"	Marvin Rainwater	Marvin Rainwater	Sings With A Heart, With A Beat	1958	

=== Hello songs covered by others ===
Song	Writer(s)	First artist	Name	Album	Year	Other
"Games Up"	Shephard, Springate, Sego	The Glitter Band	"Games Up"	Rock 'n' Roll Dudes	1975	
"Heart Get Ready For Love"	Bugatti, Musker	Kasenetz-Katz Singing Orchestral Circus	"Heart Get Ready For Love"		1977	
"Love Stealer"	Phil Wainman, Richard Myhill	Ian Lloyd	"Love Stealer"	Love Stealer	1979	
"New York Groove"	Russ Ballard	Buck & Sylvie	"Komm mit auf den Hinterhof" (German)		1975	also covered by Ace Frehley (1978)
"Star Studded Sham"	Russ Ballard	The Stiffs	Star Studded Sham	The Punk Collection	1999	

== Personnel ==
Former members

- Bob Bradbury (born Robert Bradley 14 January 1956 Tottenham) – lead vocals, rhythm guitar (1971–1979, 2002–2025)
- Corrie Shiells (born 16 November 1976, Hampstead London) – bass, backing vocals (2002–2025)
- Simon Ellis – lead guitar, backing vocals (2002–2025)
- Jake Bradbury – drums (2013–2025)
- Keith Marshall (born 5 June 1956, Hampstead, London) – lead guitar, harmonica, backing vocals (1971–1979)
- Vic Faulkner (born Victor Faulkner, 27 February 1956, Hampstead) – bass (1971–1979)
- Jeff Allen (born Jeffrey Leon Allen, 8 March 1956, Tottenham) – drums (1971–1979)
- Alex Budge – drums (2002–2013)

== See also ==
- List of performers on Top of the Pops
- List of glam rock artists
