= Rock 'n' Roll Dudes =

Rock 'N' Roll Dudes

Studio album by The Glitter Band
- Released: April 1975
- Genre: Glam rock
- Length: 35:26
- Label: Bell Records UK
- Producer: Mike Leander

The Glitter Band chronology
Hey (1974)	Rock 'N' Roll Dudes (1975)	Listen To The Band (1975)

Rock 'n' Roll Dudes is the second album by the English band The Glitter Band, released in 1975 on the Bell record label. It reached No. 17 on the UK Albums Chart.

== Track listing ==
Side one

1. "For Always and Ever" (John Springate, John Rossall)
2. "Sweet Baby Blue" (John Springate)
3. "I Can't Stop" (John Springate)
4. "Write Me a Letter" (Gerry Shephard, Pete Phipps)
5. "All My Love" (Pete Phipps)
6. "Goodbye My Love" (Gerry Shephard)

Side two

7. "Game's Up" (Gerry Shephard, John Springate, Eddie Seago)
8. "Bring Her Back" (Gerry Shephard, John Springate)
9. "Pictures of You" (Gerry Shephard, Pete Phipps)
10. "Do You Remember" (Gerry Shephard, John Rossall)
11. "You're Trying Too Hard" (Harvey Ellison)
12. "Let's Get Together Again" (Gerry Shephard, John Rossall)

== Charts ==
Chart (1975)	Peak position
Australian (Kent Music Report)	35

== Personnel ==
- Gerry Shephard - guitars, lead (4, 5, 7, 9-12) and backing vocals
- Harvey Ellison - saxophones
- John Rossall - saxophones
- John Springate - bass, lead (1-3, 6, 8) and backing vocals
- Pete Phipps - drums, backing vocals, piano

== Production ==
- Produced by Mike Leander in Paris and London for G.T.O. Productions
- Sound Supervision by John Hudson
- Album cover photography by J. Trapman
- Album sleeve design by MLT Marketing Associates.
