= Glittermen =

English glam rock band

- Origin: United Kingdom
- Genres: Pop; glam rock
- Years active: 1972–1973
- Label: Bell
- Past members: John Rossall (Sax/Trom); John White (Drums); Gerry Shephard (Guitar); Ray Moxley (Bass); Harvey Ellison (Sax); Pete Phipps (Drums); Pete Gill (Drums); Bob Edmonds (Sax); Albert Darley (Bass); John Springate (Bass)

The Glittermen were a glam rock band from England, who backed Gary Glitter, un-credited, on his first four hit singles, from June 1972 until the summer of 1973, when they then officially became known as The Glitter Band. Continuing to back Gary Glitter on some of his further hit singles, but now as 'The Glitter Band', they began releasing records of their own under their new name. As The Glitter Band, they had seven UK Top 20 hit singles between March 1974 through to April 1976, and three hit albums.

== History ==
Mike Leander the producer and co-writer of Gary Glitter's early tracks, realised that they would need a band for live performances after "Rock and Roll Part 2", a mainly instrumental B-side, became an unexpected hit. The 'Glittermen', as they were originally called, were drafted in from the Boston Show Band, a mainly covers band, formed in 1966 by John Rossall, on the agreement that Leander would help them to release their own records. Gary Glitter had in fact performed with the Boston Show Band when he was known as Paul Raven during some of their club residencies over in Germany and John Rossall had in the early 1960s been a member of the Mike Leander Showband that toured the UK. They continued to perform as The Boston in Germany in between their work with Glitter into early 1973 before finally becoming known as 'The Glitter Band'. The original line-up of the 'Glittermen' / Glitterband consisted of: John Rossall, Ray Moxley, Harvey Ellison, Gerry Shephard and John White although there would be various changes and additions to this line-up during their success period. Only John Rossall and Harvey Ellison actually played on the first two Gary Glitter albums. Leander played most of the instruments along with Glitter singing.

=== Singles ===
Year	Title	Artist	UK Singles Chart
1972	"Rock and Roll"	Gary Glitter	No. 2
1972	"I Didn't Know I Loved You (Till I Saw You Rock and Roll)"	Gary Glitter	No. 4
1973	"Do You Wanna Touch Me"	Gary Glitter	No. 2
1973	"Hello, Hello, I'm Back Again"	Gary Glitter	No. 2
