= Keith Marshall (musician) =

- Born: 5 June 1956 (age 69)
- Occupation: Musician
- Formerly of: Hello

Keith Marshall (born 5 June 1956) is an English rock musician from North London. His self-penned 1981 single, "Only Crying", charted at No. 12 on the UK Singles Chart. He had previously been the guitarist for Hello.

== Life and career ==
=== Early life and Hello ===
Keith Marshall was born on 5 June 1956, in North London. He formed the Age in 1968 along with Bob Bradbury and Chris Cross' brother Jeff Allen, whom he knew from school. They renamed themselves Hello in 1971 after being discovered by Rod Argent of the Zombies and his band's road manager David Blaylock. They recorded the original version of "Can't Let You Go" which, when covered by Barry Ryan, charted at No. 32 on the UK Singles Chart, and then Nicky Chinn and Mike Chapman's "Dyna-Mite" which, when covered by Mud, charted at No. 4. Their first UK Singles Chart entry was a cover of the Exciters' "Tell Him", that charted at No. 6. After two singles flopped everywhere but Germany, the band recorded Russ Ballard's composition "New York Groove", which charted at No. 9 for them, and later at No. 13 on the Billboard Hot 100 for Ace Frehley. After further releases were only successful in Germany, the band relocated there.

=== Solo career and "Only Crying" ===
In 1979, Marshall's solo single, "Remember Me", charted at No. 40 on the German Singles Chart. According to Bob Bradbury, in Will Hodgkinson's 2022 book In Perfect Harmony, he was asked to sign a stack of singles for their German fan club. It was the sight of those copies of the single that made him realise that Hello was finished. Marshall left the band the same year, with Blaylock remaining his manager. After UK labels were unwilling to sign Marshall, Blaylock set up his own label, Arrival Records. Having previously issued Allen's unsuccessful single "Local Boy Makes Good", released under the name "Horoscope", the label's second single was "Only Crying", written and released by Marshall. "Only Crying" was released on 27 February 1981, and charted at No. 12 on the UK Singles Chart.

Marshall then released a further single, "Silver and Diamonds", followed by an eponymous album, that charted at No. 43 on the German Albums Chart, the single "Let Me Rock You" that charted at No. 45 on the German Singles Chart, and then the 1982 single "Light Years". He then produced Kerry Delius' "They Say It's Gonna Rain", which when covered by Hazell Dean, charted at No. 58 on the UK Singles Chart, and in 1987, he released Tonight We Dance - The Singles Collection, a greatest hits album. The liner notes for his 1988 single "China Doll" allege that he had spent a period working "with many artists here in the UK and abroad", and that he had "only recently" diversified into developing a solo album, which was scheduled for "early 1989". In 1997, he released the greatest hits album The Very Best of Keith Marshall.
