= Pete Phipps =

British rock drummer, singer and songwriter (born 1951)

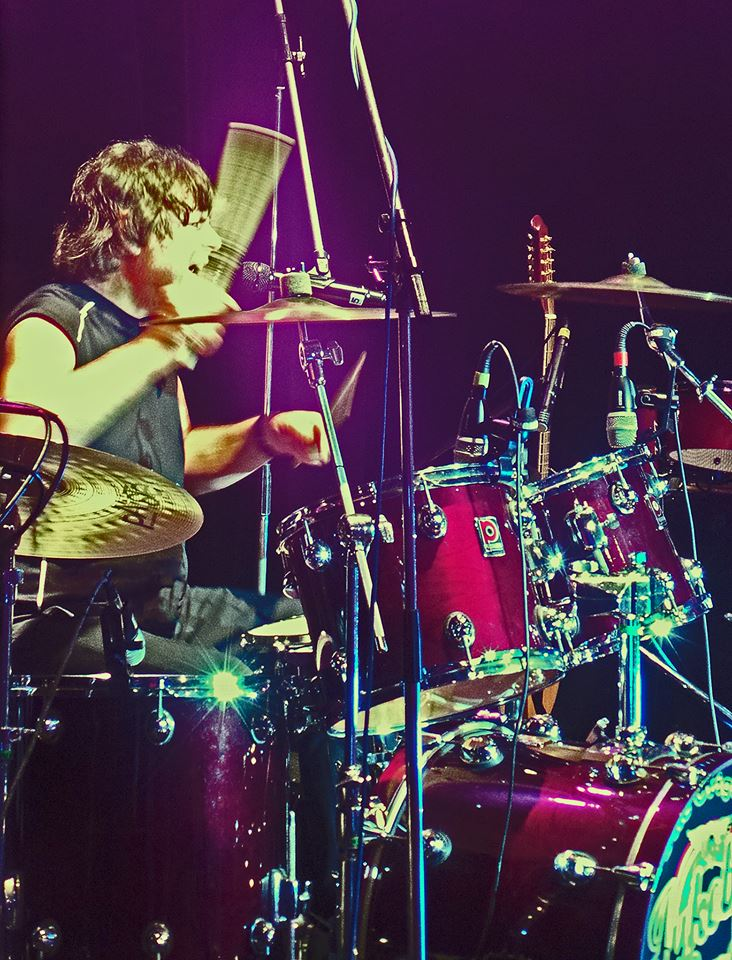

Background information
- Born: Peter William Phipps; 5 August 1951 (age 75); Clapham, South London, England
- Genres: Rock; pop; glam rock
- Occupations: Drummer; singer; songwriter
- Years active: Late 1960s–present
- Labels: Bell; CBS; Epic; Cherry Red
- Member of: Mud
- Formerly of: Gary Glitter; The Glitter Band; XTC; Eurythmics; Denim
- Website: PetePhipps.co.uk

Peter William Phipps (born 5 August 1951) is a rock drummer, singer and songwriter known for his work with Gary Glitter, the Glitter Band, and later Eurythmics, XTC and Denim. He is currently a member of both the Glitter Band and Mud.

== Biography ==
Phipps was a founder member of the Glitter Band (originally known as The Glittermen), who started as Gary Glitter's backing band, and went on to success in their own right, having six top ten singles in the UK in the mid-1970s. He was later a member of the band Random Hold, who toured with XTC in 1979, leading to him playing the majority of the drums on the XTC album Mummer (1983) after Terry Chambers left the band, and he returned for the recording of their next studio album The Big Express (1984). He also played drums for Eurythmics, joining the band for their MTV-broadcast performance at the Heaven nightclub in London, and playing live with the band into 1984. He was also a member of Lawrence's post-Felt band Denim, which has been described as "self-consciously ironic glitter-pop revivalist project", playing on the 1992 album Back in Denim and the 1996 album Denim on Ice. Phipps was also the drummer on Liquid Gold's hits which included "Dance Yourself Dizzy".

== Musical biography ==
After learning to play drums, piano and guitar, his musical career took off at the age of 18, he has worked continuously since that time for a wide range of bands and artists. After leaving school in 1969 he joined Black Velvet, a soul/funk band – tours, recording and radio shows. A year later, he toured with the Elgins. Then in 1971, he joined CBS band Heaven and supported Jeff Beck on tour in the UK and Germany.

In June 1972, he began working for Gary Glitter's backing band the Glittermen and, in the same month, they made their first appearance on Top of the Pops with "Rock and Roll Part 2". The Glittermen were renamed the Glitter Band and established a separate identity consisting of a six-member lineup Gerry Shephard (lead guitar/lead vocals), John Springate (bass/lead vocals), Pete Phipps (drums and keyboards), Tony Leonard (drums), John Rossall (trombone) Harvey Ellison (saxophone). Tours with Gary Glitter continued.

In December 1975, their third studio album Listen to the Band, saw Phipps for the first time on lead vocals on the self-penned "My First Mistake". In 1977, their fourth studio album, Paris Match was recorded in France, plus an extended play (EP) featuring "She Was Alright" (written by Phipps) as the A-side.

Changing direction, Phipps first joined Ex-Directory a jazz rock band where he first met Vic Martin (who would later, with Phipps, join Eurythmics); this was then followed by a short period with a London-based punk rock band called the Secret. Phipps was then asked to join Random Hold, a band he had already worked with a year or two before. Random Hold consisted of David Rhodes, Bill MacCormick, David Ferguson, and Pete Phipps, and were described by a music journalist as "disco orientated rock", and by Nina Myskow in The Sun as a band to watch for as "Their music shows talent, menace, originality and brains. A dynamic combination". The band produced several singles in this period including "Montgomery Clift" and albums The View from Here (1980) and Burn the Buildings (1981). Phipps also continued to record with Glitter Band colleagues pursuing solo identities, such as with John Springate recording an album together in Springate's own Rock Star Studio and playing drums on the 1979 studio album Put Your Money Where Your Mouth Is, by Gerry Shephard and Peter Oxendale.

In 1982, Phipps was invited by Mike Rutherford of Genesis to play on his final solo studio album Acting Very Strange, and later in the same year was invited by XTC to record with them on their studio album, Mummer.

Through 1983 and 1984 he was a member of Eurythmics. His first outing with Eurythmics was recorded at Heaven for MTV and later released as the video Sweet Dreams (1985). He toured in the US and in the UK. Also in 1984, Phipps returned to work with XTC in the studio to record the album The Big Express.

In 1985, Phipps recorded with the Stranglers' Hugh Cornwell playing on the single "One in a Million". He then rejoined Gary Glitter for UK, Middle East and US tours. He also restarted Glitter Band gigs, joining with some of the other original members, and has remained part of the Glitter Band with a number of different line-ups to the present day.

In 1986, Phipps performed on Zipper an album written by Roger Chapman. In 1987 he toured as a replacement in Culture Club in France and Iceland. The next year, Phipps played with the Legendary Purple Helmets a Stranglers offshoot. Between 1992 and 1996, whilst remaining in the Glitter Band, Phipps joined Denim, a band formed by Lawrence. He recorded Back in Denim (1992 and Denim on Ice (1996). Through 1998 and 1999, Phipps had further shows with the Glitter Band and appearances with the King Penguins, a spin-off from the Glitter Band.

The year 2000 saw the founding of Santanarama, a six-piece tribute to Carlos Santana, and Glitz Blitz, a three-piece tribute to the 1970s. Early in 2001, along with shows with the Glitter Band, Santanarama and Glitz Blitz at a range of venues nationwide, Phipps made a return to playing some R&B with a South East-based band Desperate Measures. Later in the year, he recorded an album of material with Alan Merrill of the Arrows which was released the following year.

In August 2020, he released his first solo album of original songs entitled Wherever You Are. The album was recorded in Metway Studios, Brighton and produced by Mike Wilton and engineered by Jake Routham.

Phipps currently performs worldwide as the Glitter Band playing a variety of venues up and down the UK and on the Continent, and has also been a member of Mud since 2015. He has recorded with:

- Gary Glitter
- The Glitter Band
- XTC
- Mike Rutherford
- Hugh Cornwell
- Roger Chapman
- Alan Merrill
- Random Hold
- Liquid Gold
- Kahimi Karie
- Eurythmics
- Denim

He has also toured with:

- Mud
- Boy George
- Eurythmics
- Eric Faulkner's Bay City Rollers
- Andy Scott's Sweet
