= Keeps Us Off the Streets =

Keeps Us off the Streets

Studio album by Hello
- Released: 1976
- Genre: Pop, Rock
- Length: 38:19
- Label: Bell
- Producer: Mike Leander

Hello chronology
Keeps Us off the Streets (1976)	Hello Again (1978)

Professional ratings
Review scores
Source	Rating
Allmusic	4/5 stars

Keeps Us Off the Streets is the debut album by British glam rock band Hello, released in 1976.

== Track listing ==
No.	Title	Writer(s)	Length
1.	"Teenage Revolution"	Jeff Allen, Chris Allen	2:39
2.	"Keeps Us Off the Streets"	Jeff Allen, Chris Allen	2:59
3.	"She Knows"	Darryl Cotton, Steve Kipner, Michael Lloyd	2:45
4.	"Carol"	Chuck Berry	3:49
5.	"Then She Kissed Me"	Jeff Barry, Ellie Greenwich, Phil Spector	3:41
6.	"Tell Him"	Bert Russell	3:07
7.	"New York Groove"	Russ Ballard	2:45
8.	"Let's Spend the Night Together"	Mick Jagger, Keith Richards	3:46
9.	"Shakin' All Over"	Frederick Heath	4:14
10.	"Hold Me"	Little Jack Little, David Oppenheim, Ira Schuster	2:48
11.	"Another School Day"	Jeff Allen, Bob Bradbury, Keith Marshall	2:51
12.	"Star Studded Sham"	Russ Ballard	2:55

== Personnel ==
- Bob Bradbury - lead vocals, rhythm guitar
- Keith Marshall - lead guitar, backing vocals
- Vic Faulkner - bass
- Jeff Allen - drums
