= Remember Me This Way =

Remember Me This Way may refer to:

- Remember Me This Way (film), a 1974 documentary about Gary Glitter
  - Remember Me This Way (album), a soundtrack album from the film
  - "Remember Me This Way" (song), the title song from the film and album
- "Remember Me This Way", a song by Jordan Hill, featured in the 1995 film Casper
- "Remember Me This Way", a song by The Legendary Pink Dots from From Here You'll Watch the World Go By (1995)
