= Rainbow Theatre =

Grade II* listed theatre in London, England

Coordinates: 51.5628212°N 0.1080185°W

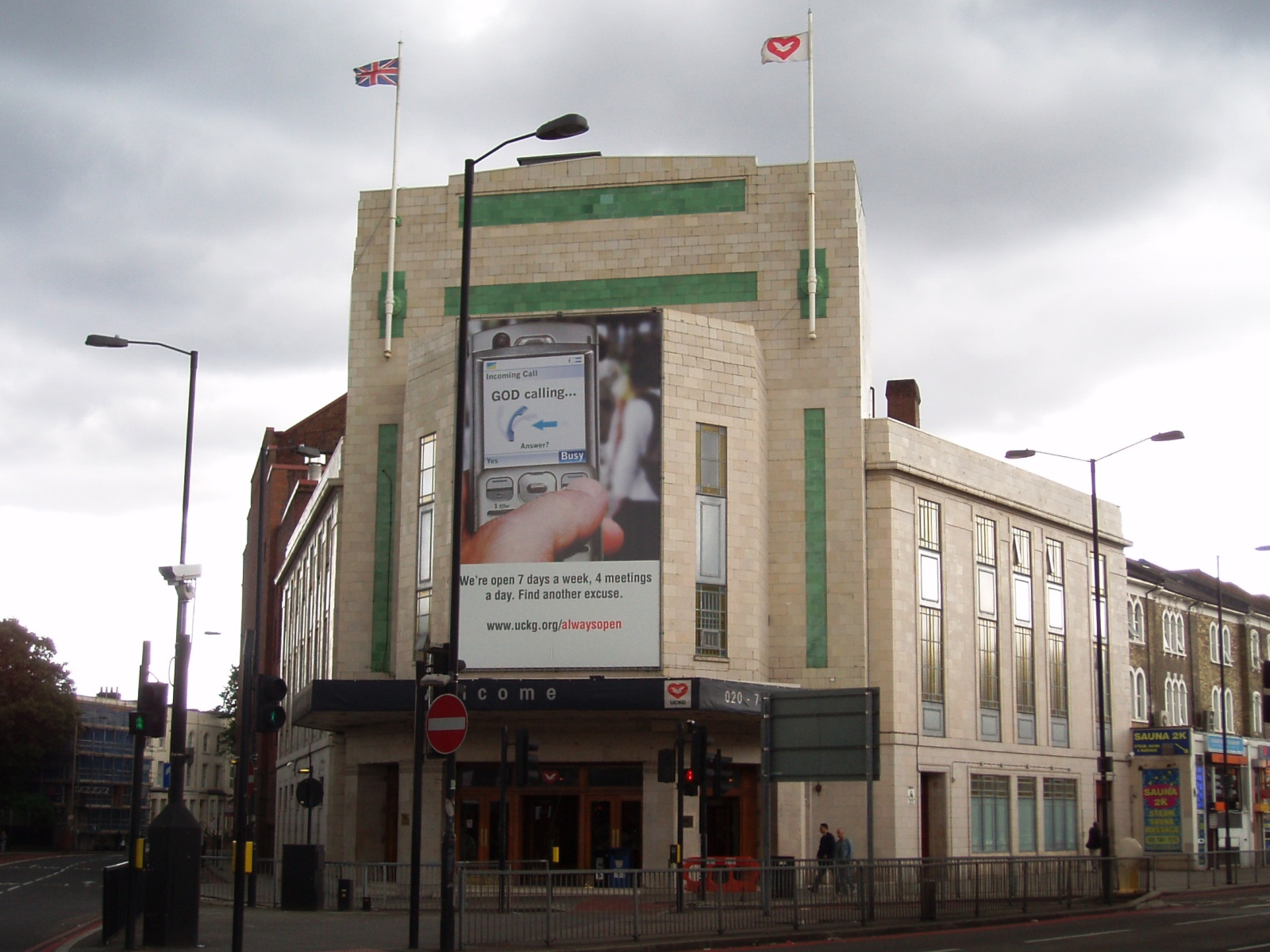
- Exterior view as its current use (c.2008)
- Interactive map of Rainbow Theatre
- Former names: Finsbury Park Astoria (1930–39); Odeon Astoria (1939–70); The Odeon (1970–71)
- Address: 232 Seven Sisters Road; London, England N4 3NP
- Location: Finsbury Park
- Owner: The Rank Organisation
- Capacity: 2,802

Construction
- Opened: 29 September 1930
- Renovated: 1975–77
- Closed: January 1982
- Architect: Edward Albert Stone

The Rainbow Theatre, originally known as the Finsbury Park Astoria, then the Finsbury Park Paramount Astoria, and then the Finsbury Park Odeon, is a Grade II*-listed building in Finsbury Park, London. The theatre was built in 1930 as an "atmospheric cinema", to house entertainment extravaganzas which included a film show. It later became an ordinary cinema, then a music venue, as which it is best known, and then an occasional unlicensed boxing venue. Today, the building is used by the Universal Church of the Kingdom of God, an Evangelical church.

== History ==
Built in 1930, the building was listed Grade II* in 1974, an unusually short period after construction, with the interior described in great detail as a Hispano-Moresque fantasy.

Former stage manager Rick Burton has published a website with a detailed history of who has performed at the theatre and when, and which is a major source for this article.

=== Atmospheric cinema theatre: 1930–1939 ===
The building was built as the last of five venues for Arthur Segal, the original Astoria being in Charing Cross Road (demolished due to Crossrail development in 2009) and the others in Streatham (now an 8-cinema Odeon multiplex), Old Kent Road (since demolished) and Brixton (now the Brixton Academy music venue). Although the Charing Cross Road Astoria was a more conventional cinema, the last four were built as "atmospheric cinemas", also, and perhaps more accurately, called atmospheric theatres, built to evoke the feeling of being outdoors, most often in a Mediterranean village in the twilight, with stars in the sky, moving clouds and sometimes even "flying" birds. They were cinemas but not as we know them, places where one could spend a whole evening, including cafes and bars, organ recitals, orchestral concerts and see a full variety show as well as a movie. Two more theatres for the chain were intended, but never built.

When it opened on 29 September 1930, the Finsbury Park Astoria was one of the largest cinemas in the world. standing at the junction of Isledon Road and Seven Sisters Road on an island site.

The plain faience exterior, designed by Edward A. Stone, acted as a foil to a lavish 'atmospheric interior' by Somerford & Barr, with decoration carried out by Marc-Henri and G. Laverdet. A Moorish foyer with a goldfish-filled fountain (which survives today) led to an auditorium recalling an Andalucian village at night. Originally, the venue boasted 4,000 seats, which may have included cafes and bars outside the auditorium. The stage, 35 feet (11 m) deep and spanned by a 64-foot-wide (20 m) proscenium arch, was equipped with a twin-console Compton 3-manual/13-rank theatre organ (opened by G. T. Pattman). There was a large orchestra pit. Backstage, there were 12 dressing rooms. The opening night featured Ronald Colman in Condemned and a Gala Stage Spectacle, with artists from the other Astoria Theatres making a special engagement on the stage.

In December 1930, the Astoria chain was taken over by Paramount Pictures, and plans for additional theatres in Wood Green and Catford were cancelled.

=== Cinema with occasional concerts and variety shows: 1939–1956 ===
The cost of so many performers was prodigious (which is why the theatres were built so large, to allow for many paying customers). After 9 years, Paramount decided that the format was no longer viable, and on 27 November 1939, sold the buildings to Oscar Deutsch's Odeon Theatres Ltd, who cancelled all entertainment other than films and organ recitals, thereby allowing several showings per day for the films. This format did prove profitable. They did occasionally have orchestral concerts and variety shows, but the main business was as a cinema.

=== Gradual change in focus from cinema to music venue: 1956–1971 ===
In 1956, the cinema management pulled off a remarkable coup, which would signal a slow change towards being a rock venue. A Soho coffee bar under new management, the 2i's, had fitted a stage in a small basement room with standing room for 20 people, where rock and roll hopefuls could take the (one and only, old) mike, to be paid in "coffee and Cokes". They quickly got a reputation for exciting new acts, and talent spotters started to visit. In the 14 years they were open, around 40 stars would be discovered there, and six months after opening it was the turn of a young merchant seaman who had been influenced by Buddy Holly. Tommy Steele, who would soon be Britain's first teen idol and rock and roll star, and billed as "Britain's answer to Elvis" was heard by a publicity man. Within 2 weeks, he had a contract with Decca. His debut single reached 13 in the chart in its second week on 8 November, and 4 weeks after that, he was heading the bill in a variety show at the Paramount Astoria or, as we now know it, the Rainbow Theatre. He got rave reviews, though sometimes backhanded — Melody Maker said on 8 December 1956 "...it seemed little short of a miracle that this 19-year-old youth could receive such a rapturous ovation for the little musical talent he displayed."

As the style of musical entertainment changed from being the main act on the bill of a variety show to rock concerts with an opening band and then the headlining band, with no other entertainment, and the venue became more and more associated with good (usually rock) music, and as those concerts became more lucrative, the number of nights when (often single night) concerts were staged instead of films increased and the building became one of the premier music venues in the capital.

1959 saw performances by the Duke Ellington Band, Cyril Davies All-Stars (with Alexis Korner and Nicky Hopkins).

The Beatles' Christmas Show ran from 24 December 1963 to 11 January 1964.

It was at this theatre that Jimi Hendrix first burned a guitar, with the collusion of his manager Chas Chandler and a journalist from NME. Hendrix set fire to his Fender Stratocaster guitar on 31 March 1967, on the opening night of the Walker Brothers tour; Hendrix's burnt fingers required treatment in hospital.

Renamed "Odeon" on 17 November 1970, the theatre was closed by the Rank Organisation on 25 September 1971 with Bill Travers in Gorgo and Hayley Mills in Twisted Nerve.

=== Music venue: 1971–1975 ===
The Odeon was converted into the Rainbow Theatre (now with 3,040 seats), and the Who performed the first concert in the newly named venue on 4 November 1971. The Who later wrote and recorded the song "Long Live Rock", which celebrates the theatre (although still referring to it as The Astoria).

The Osmonds made their debut appearance in London at the Rainbow Theatre in the early 1970s.

Frank Zappa was seriously injured on 10 December 1971, when a member of the audience ran up the side steps of the stage and pushed him off the stage into the pit in front, causing him to fracture a leg and cut his head. Zappa was in hospital for six weeks. As a result, the steep gap between the stage and floor was covered with sheets of hardboard on top of staggered scaffolding, creating an artificial but safe slope.

Alice Cooper played there on 7 November 1971 as part of the 'Love It To Death' tour before the 'Glam Rock' movement in the UK - in fact, David Bowie was in attendance, and he had urged his band to also attend in order to persuade them to 'glam up' with costumes and make-up on stage.

Occasional films were screened, including Jimi Plays Berkeley in January 1972. The venue was planned to host the premiere of Pink Floyd: Live at Pompeii on 25 November 1972. This was cancelled at the last minute by the theatre's owner, Rank Strand, on the grounds that the film did not have a certificate from the British Board of Film Censors, and the company would not allow the Rainbow Theatre, which was a music venue, to be seen as being in competition with its other established cinemas. However, they did allow the world premiere of the Leonard Cohen film Bird on a Wire on 5 July 1974 and Paul McCartney's TV film, Back to the Egg, promoting Wings' latest album, on 10 August 1979.

The Faces performed there on 12 February 1972.

Pink Floyd played a four-night stand at the venue from 17 to 20 February 1972, during their Eclipsed Tour. The last night's performance was partially broadcast on BBC Radio. The band also played two benefit concerts at the Rainbow on 4 November 1973 for Robert Wyatt, who had been recently paralyzed from a fall.

In the summer of 1972, Dave Martin of Martin Audio was commissioned to install professional audio mixing consoles and sound support equipment to this and two other proposed Rainbow theatres in and around London. Thomas "Todd" Fischer, Equipment Manager at the time for the British Rock group Uriah Heep, had established a friendship and working arrangement with Martin while on a two-week hiatus before resuming a European tour, which required Fischer to wire up the audio mixing consoles, a somewhat laborious and tedious task that took almost 10 fourteen-hour days to complete.

David Bowie performed three concerts at the Rainbow during his Ziggy Stardust Tour on 29 and 30 August 1972, then again on 24 December 1972, where he encouraged fans to bring toys to donate to local children's homes. The first two concerts were seen as cementing Bowie's growing stardom in the UK, and are recognised as two of his most important shows

Yes filmed their concerts on 15 and 16 December 1972 at the Rainbow for the 1975 film release Yessongs.

Eric Clapton played there in January 1973. Featured artists who played with him were Pete Townshend, Stevie Winwood, Ron Wood, Rich Grech, Jim Capaldi, Jimmy Karstein and Rebop. A recording of the concert was released in September 1973 as Eric Clapton's Rainbow Concert.

James Brown performed in March 1973.

King Crimson played on 18 March with support act Claire Hamill.

Roxy Music played on 31 March 1973 with support act The Sharks and Lloyd Watson, after supporting David Bowie's two shows at the venue in August the preceding year.

Dutch rock bands Focus and Golden Earring each recorded a live album at the theatre: Focus's At the Rainbow was recorded on 5 May 1973, Golden Earring's Live on 25 March 1977.

Dr John played a New Orleans Night with guests Allen Toussaint and the Meters on 2 July 1973.

Van Morrison performed two nights at this venue in July 1973, with his band at the time, the Caledonia Soul Orchestra. The second of the performances was broadcast in May 1974, as the first ever simultaneous broadcast, on BBC 2 and Radio 2. The concert was voted by Q magazine readers as one of the top live performances of all time. Several of the songs featured in the two concerts were included in Morrison's 1974 double live album It's Too Late to Stop Now.

Genesis performed many times at the Rainbow over their career. Selections of their concert of 20 October 1973 were included on the first Genesis Archive set, released in 1998; the complete concert was later released as Live at the Rainbow Theatre as part of the Live 1973–2007 box set in 2009.

Latin rock band Santana played at the Rainbow on 14 and 15 November 1973, doing two shows on each day.

The Sweet also appeared at the Rainbow Theatre on 21 December 1973 and subsequently released a live album called Live at the Rainbow 1973.

Glam rock singer Gary Glitter performed a show here on Christmas Day 1973. The performance was used on his live album Remember Me This Way and in his concert film of the same title.

Deep Purple were included in the 1974 Guinness Book of World Records as "the globe's loudest band" by reason of their concert on 30 June 1972 at the Rainbow Theatre.

In January 1974, Stevie Wonder played two dates at the Rainbow, among his first public performances after surviving a serious car accident five months earlier. The sold-out concerts were attended by many fellow musicians, including Paul McCartney, Ringo Starr, Pete Townshend, Charlie Watts, Rod Stewart, Eric Clapton, and David Bowie.

On 31 March 1974, Queen played a concert for their Queen II Tour.

June 1, 1974 is an album of the collaborative performance at the Rainbow Theatre by Kevin Ayers, John Cale, Nico and Brian Eno. Other musicians, including Mike Oldfield and Robert Wyatt, also contributed to the concert. Kevin Ayers then returned six months later on 1 December to play a concert with his own band.

Queen returned and recorded two concerts at the Rainbow on 19–20 November 1974. Footage from these was released on VHS in the 1992 box set Box of Tricks, and on CD, DVD, SD and Blu-ray in 2014 on an album titled Live at the Rainbow '74. The band revisited the venue in December 1979, as part of its Crazy Tour of London.

The original line-up of Little Feat with guitarist and singer Lowell George played on 19 January 1975, second on the bill to the Doobie Brothers.

On Sunday, 16 March 1975, a concert by various artists was recorded by the Virgin Mobile and later released in the Chrysalis label, as Over The Rainbow (The Last Concert, Live!) The concert included performances by Sassafras, Procol Harum, Frankie Miller (backed by Procol Harum), Richard & Linda Thompson, Hatfield and the North, John Martyn and Kevin Coyne. The building then closed for several months for maintenance and refurbishment.

=== Music venue: 1975–1982 ===
Kool & the Gang recorded three live tracks at the Rainbow for their Love & Understanding album, released in 1976.

Genesis opened their Wind & Wuthering Tour on 1 January 1977, playing for three consecutive nights, marking the re-opening of the venue.

Marc Bolan & T. Rex played at the Rainbow on 18 March 1977, along with the Damned as support. This was part of the band's Dandy in the Underworld tour. This concert performance is featured as part of T. Rex's Live 1977 and in Conversation CD album (2007).

Fleetwood Mac performed during their "Rumours" World Tour for three nights on 8–10 April 1977. Bob Marley & the Wailers played on 1, 2, 3 and 4 June 1977 at the Rainbow Theatre, as part of the Exodus Tour. The last show of the tour was released as the video cassette Bob Marley and the Wailers Live! at the Rainbow. In July 1991 a video documentary, Bob Marley and the Wailers: Live! At the Rainbow, directed by Keef, was released in the UK. On 16 October 2001, Tuff Gong released five songs from the 4 June 1977 Rainbow Theatre performance on disc two of Exodus (Deluxe Edition). On 12 June 2020 this concert was streamed live worldwide on YouTube as "Bob Marley Live at the Rainbow", with HD quality, in order to raise money in connection with the COVID-19 pandemic.

Elton John with Ray Cooper played six nights at the Rainbow from 2 May 1977. The first night was a black tie charity "Gala Night" in aid of Queen Elizabeth's Silver Jubilee Appeal and was attended by HRH Princess Alexandra. These were the first of 234 concerts the duo played without a band.

Little Feat played four nights there on 1–4 August 1977, with the Tower of Power horn section. The concerts were recorded, and some material was later released on Waiting for Columbus. Mick Taylor was the guest guitarist on the third night and played on two songs, "An Apolitical Blues" and "Teenage Nervous Breakdown".

Donna Summer performed at the Rainbow Theatre on 23 and 24 October 1977.

The Ramones played two gigs at the venue on 31 December 1977 and 1 January 1978. The New Year's Eve concert was recorded and released as the It's Alive album.

Thin Lizzy recorded their Live and Dangerous video at the Rainbow in March 1978.

Olivia Newton-John played two dates of her "Totally Hot World Tour" here on 28 and 29 November 1978.

The Boomtown Rats played two dates on 14 and 15 December 1978. Supported by The Vipers.

The Jacksons played at the Rainbow Theatre on 6, 7, 8, 9, 23 and 24 February 1979 as part of their Destiny World Tour to support the Destiny album, which had been released late in the previous year.

Paul McCartney's TV film, Back to the Egg, promoting Wings' latest album, on 10 August 1979, became the last film to be screened at the Rainbow Theatre, on 10 August 1979.

Secret Affair played the Rainbow on 8 December 1979.

Dire Straits performed at the Rainbow Theatre in December 1979, a recording of which is included in the Live 1978–1992 box set released on 3 December 2023.

Part of Stiff Little Fingers' first live album, Hanx!, was recorded at the Rainbow in 1980.

A New York Band Celebration, Billed as The Taking Liberties Show, took place on 20 February 1981. The Fleshtones, The Bush Tetras, The Raybeats, The Bongos, The dBs, and Polyrock performed. The whole show was recorded an issued as a compilation album, Start Swimming, released on Stiff Records.

Iron Maiden performed here multiple times in 1980 and 1981 and recorded a video, Live at the Rainbow released in 1981. Iron Maiden also recorded their first music video, "Women in Uniform", directed by Doug Smith and released in 1980, here.

The Grateful Dead played two series of shows at the Rainbow in 1981, on 20–24 March, and 2–6 October. The 20 & 21 March shows were released on Dave's Picks Volume 56. The Grateful Dead also had planned to play the Theatre in 1972 and 1978, these were both cancelled.

The dramatic climax to the 1980 British film Breaking Glass was shot here. Directed by Brian Gibson, it starred Hazel O'Connor, Phil Daniels and Jonathan Pryce.

Toyah performed here in February 1981, which was filmed and released as Toyah Live At The Rainbow by BBC video later that year.

The building had been the subject of a preservation order in the 1970s and the management company that operated the venue was unable to maintain it to the required standard. The building was closed permanently in 1982, although there were plans for its conversion to a bingo hall.

=== Closed, occasional unlicensed boxing venue: 1982–1988 ===
Following the closure of the Rainbow Theatre in early 1982 (last concert on 24 December 1981), it was designated a listed building, but lay empty and largely disused for the next 14 years. It was used occasionally in unlicensed boxing matches, most notably in April 1986 when Lenny McLean beat Roy Shaw in a dramatic first-round knockout.

=== Church: 1988 onwards ===
From 1988, the building was used as a church by "The Rainbow Christian Fellowship", and then briefly by the Elim Pentecostal Church before, in 1995, being taken over by its current owners, the Universal Church of the Kingdom of God, a Brazilian Pentecostal church, and the theatre is now the main base for UCKG in the UK. They began work restoring the building and turning it into a church. The auditorium restoration was completed by 1999, the foyer by 2001, and in 2004 it was opened to the public for one night in partnership with the Cinema Theatre Association. At that event, the Guardian described the Theatre as 'jaw dropping' and chairman of the CTA, Mr Richard Gray, said the building was "one of the greatest cinemas of its kind in Europe". He described its restoration as "astonishingly" good.

== Nearby ==
Another music venue, The Sir George Robey, later "The Powerhaus" and then "Robey", stood opposite, and itself closed in 2004. It has since been demolished.

== Other sources ==
- Gray, Richard (1996). Cinemas In Britain – One Hundred Years of Cinema Architecture. Lund Humphries. ISBN 0853316856.
- "News". Archived from the original on 7 January 2009.
