= List of Elton John and Ray Cooper concert tours =

- Tour by Elton John
- Start date: 2 May 1977
- End date: 29 March 2012
- Legs: 10
- No. of shows: 5 in 1977; 117 in 1979; 1 in 1990; 20 in 1993; 29 in 1994; 16 in 1995; 7 in 2009; 31 in 2010; 4 in 2011; 4 in 2012; 234 in total

In 1979, Elton John toured Israel and the USSR with Ray Cooper. The duo proved successful and they performed concerts together a total of 234 times in ten of the years between 1977 and 2012.

== 1977 tour ==
Date	City	Country	Venue
Europe
2 May 1977	London	England	Rainbow Theatre
3 May 1977	London	England	Rainbow Theatre
4 May 1977	London	England	Rainbow Theatre
5 May 1977	London	England	Rainbow Theatre
6 May 1977	London	England	Rainbow Theatre
7 May 1977	London	England	Rainbow Theatre

=== Setlist ===
Standard setlist
1. Your Song
2. The Greatest Discovery
3. Border Song
4. Daniel
5. Sweet Painted Lady
6. Rocket Man
7. I Heard It Through the Grapevine
8. Candle in the Wind
9. Roy Rogers
10. Dan Dare (Pilot of the Future)
11. Cage the Songbird
12. Where to Now St. Peter?
13. Ticking
14. Don't Let the Sun Go Down on Me
15. Take Me to the Pilot
16. Funeral for a Friend/Tonight
17. Better Off Dead
18. Idol
19. I Feel Like a Bullet (In the Gun of Robert Ford)
20. I Think I'm Going to Kill Myself
21. Sorry Seems to Be the Hardest Word
22. Crazy Water
23. Bennie and the Jets
24. Saturday Night's Alright (For Fighting)
25. Goodbye

== 1979 tour ==
Date	City	Country	Venue
Europe
5 February 1979	Stockholm	Sweden	Konserthuset
6 February 1979	Stockholm	Sweden	Konserthuset
7 February 1979	Copenhagen	Denmark	Tivolis Koncertsal
8 February 1979	Copenhagen	Denmark	Tivolis Koncertsal
10 February 1979	Hamburg	West Germany	Musikhalle Hamburg
11 February 1979	The Hague	Netherlands	Nederlands Congres Centrum
12 February 1979	Rotterdam	Netherlands	De Doelen
14 February 1979	Amsterdam	Netherlands	Concertgebouw
15 February 1979	Mannheim	West Germany	Mannheimer Rosengarten
16 February 1979	Munich	West Germany	Deutsches Museum
18 February 1979	West Berlin	West Germany	Kongresshalle
19 February 1979	Cologne	West Germany	Cologne Opera House
20 February 1979	Paris	France	Théâtre des Champs-Élysées
21 February 1979	Paris	France	Théâtre des Champs-Élysées
22 February 1979	Paris	France	Théâtre des Champs-Élysées
23 February 1979	Paris	France	Théâtre des Champs-Élysées
24 February 1979	Paris	France	Théâtre des Champs-Élysées
25 February 1979	Paris	France	Théâtre des Champs-Élysées
26 February 1979	Antwerp	Belgium	Queen Elizabeth Hall
27 February 1979	Antwerp	Belgium	Queen Elizabeth Hall
1 March 1979	Düsseldorf	West Germany	Philips Halle
2 March 1979	Wiesbaden	West Germany	Rhein Main Halle
3 March 1979	Lausanne	Switzerland	Palais de Beaulieu
4 March 1979	Lausanne	Switzerland	Palais de Beaulieu
6 March 1979	Nice	France	Théâtre de verdure de Nice
7 March 1979	Nice	France	Théâtre de verdure de Nice
9 March 1979	Badalona	Spain	Pavelló del Club Juventut
10 March 1979	Badalona	Spain	Pavelló del Club Juventut
11 March 1979	Madrid	Spain	Pabellón de Deportes del Real Madrid
17 March 1979	Glasgow	Scotland	Apollo Theatre
18 March 1979	Glasgow	Scotland	Apollo Theatre
19 March 1979	Edinburgh	Scotland	Edinburgh Odeon
21 March 1979	Newcastle	England	Newcastle City Hall
22 March 1979	Newcastle	England	Newcastle City Hall
23 March 1979	Preston	England	Preston Guild Hall
26 March 1979	Belfast	Northern Ireland	Whitla Hall
27 March 1979	Belfast	Northern Ireland	Whitla Hall
29 March 1979	Dublin	Ireland	Dublin National Stadium
30 March 1979	Dublin	Ireland	Dublin National Stadium
2 April 1979	London	England	Drury Lane Theatre Royal
3 April 1979	London	England	Drury Lane Theatre Royal
4 April 1979	London	England	Drury Lane Theatre Royal
5 April 1979	London	England	Drury Lane Theatre Royal
6 April 1979	London	England	Drury Lane Theatre Royal
7 April 1979	London	England	Drury Lane Theatre Royal
9 April 1979	Brighton	England	Brighton Dome
10 April 1979	Brighton	England	Brighton Dome
11 April 1979	Southampton	England	Gaumont Theatre
12 April 1979	Southampton	England	Gaumont Theatre
14 April 1979	Bristol	England	Bristol Hippodrome
15 April 1979	Bristol	England	Bristol Hippodrome
17 April 1979	Oxford	England	New Theatre Oxford
18 April 1979	Coventry	England	Coventry Theatre
19 April 1979	Derby	England	Derby Assembly Rooms
21 April 1979	Birmingham	England	Birmingham Hippodrome
22 April 1979	Birmingham	England	Birmingham Hippodrome
24 April 1979	Manchester	England	Manchester Apollo
25 April 1979	Manchester	England	Manchester Apollo
26 April 1979	Manchester	England	Manchester Apollo
Middle East
1 May 1979	Jerusalem	Israel	Jerusalem Philharmonic Hall
2 May 1979	Jerusalem	Israel	Jerusalem Philharmonic Hall
3 May 1979	Jerusalem	Israel	Jerusalem Philharmonic Hall
5 May 1979	Tel Aviv	Israel	Fredric R. Mann Auditorium
6 May 1979	Tel Aviv	Israel	Fredric R. Mann Auditorium
Europe
21 May 1979	Leningrad	Soviet Union	Great October Hall
22 May 1979	Leningrad	Soviet Union	Great October Hall
23 May 1979	Leningrad	Soviet Union	Great October Hall
24 May 1979	Leningrad	Soviet Union	Great October Hall
25 May 1979	Moscow	Soviet Union	Rossya Hall
26 May 1979	Moscow	Soviet Union	Rossya Hall
27 May 1979	Moscow	Soviet Union	Rossya Hall
28 May 1979	Moscow	Soviet Union	Rossya Hall
Oceania
1 September 1979	Melbourne	Australia	Melbourne Festival Hall
Back in the USA Tour
19 September 1979	Tempe	United States	Gammage Memorial Auditorium
20 September 1979	Tempe	United States	Gammage Memorial Auditorium
22 September 1979	Berkeley	United States	Berkeley Community Theatre
23 September 1979	Berkeley	United States	Berkeley Community Theatre
24 September 1979	Berkeley	United States	Berkeley Community Theatre
26 September 1979	Los Angeles	United States	Gibson Amphitheatre
27 September 1979	Los Angeles	United States	Gibson Amphitheatre
28 September 1979	Los Angeles	United States	Gibson Amphitheatre
29 September 1979	Los Angeles	United States	Gibson Amphitheatre
30 September 1979	Los Angeles	United States	Gibson Amphitheatre
2 October 1979	Los Angeles	United States	Gibson Amphitheatre
3 October 1979	Los Angeles	United States	Gibson Amphitheatre
4 October 1979	Los Angeles	United States	Gibson Amphitheatre
5 October 1979	Los Angeles	United States	Gibson Amphitheatre
6 October 1979	Los Angeles	United States	Gibson Amphitheatre
9 October 1979	Minneapolis	United States	Northrop Auditorium
10 October 1979	Minneapolis	United States	Northrop Auditorium
11 October 1979	Chicago	United States	Auditorium Theatre
12 October 1979	Chicago	United States	Auditorium Theatre
13 October 1979	West Lafayette	United States	Elliott Hall of Music
15 October 1979	Boston	United States	Boston Music Hall
16 October 1979	Boston	United States	Boston Music Hall
18 October 1979	New York City	United States	New York City Palladium
19 October 1979	New York City	United States	New York City Palladium
20 October 1979	New York City	United States	New York City Palladium
21 October 1979	New York City	United States	New York City Palladium
23 October 1979	New York City	United States	New York City Palladium
24 October 1979	New York City	United States	New York City Palladium
25 October 1979	New York City	United States	New York City Palladium
26 October 1979	New York City	United States	New York City Palladium
27 October 1979	West Point	United States	Eisenhower Hall
29 October 1979	Ann Arbor	United States	Hill Auditorium
30 October 1979	Toronto	Canada	O'Keefe Theatre
31 October 1979	Toronto	Canada	O'Keefe Theatre
2 November 1979	Upper Darby Township	United States	Tower Theater
3 November 1979	Upper Darby Township	United States	Tower Theater
4 November 1979	Washington, D.C.	United States	DAR Constitution Hall
5 November 1979	Washington, D.C.	United States	DAR Constitution Hall
7 November 1979	Nashville	United States	Grande Ole Opry House
8 November 1979	Atlanta	United States	Atlanta Civic Center
10 November 1979	Dallas	United States	Moody Coliseum
11 November 1979	Houston	United States	Hofheinz Pavilion
Oceania
25 November 1979	Sydney	Australia	Hordern Pavilion
27 November 1979	Sydney	Australia	Hordern Pavilion
7 December 1979	Perth	Australia	Perth Entertainment Centre

=== Setlist ===
Standard setlist
1. Your Song
2. Sixty Years On
3. Daniel
4. Skyline Pigeon
5. Take Me to the Pilot
6. Rocket Man
7. Don't Let the Sun Go Down on Me
8. Goodbye Yellow Brick Road
9. Roy Rogers
10. Candle in the Wind
11. Ego
12. Where to Now St. Peter?
13. He'll Have to Go
14. Elton's Song
15. I Heard It Through the Grapevine
16. Better Off Dead
17. Idol
18. I Think I'm Going to Kill Myself
19. Funeral for a Friend / Tonight
20. I Feel Like a Bullet (In the Gun of Robert Ford)
21. Bennie and the Jets
22. Sorry Seems to Be the Hardest Word
23. Mama Can't Buy You Love
24. Part-Time Love
25. Crazy Water
26. Song for Guy
27. Saturday Night's Alright for Fighting/Pinball Wizard
28. Medley:
  1. Whole Lotta Shakin' Going On
  2. I Saw Her Standing There
  3. Twist and Shout
  4. Crocodile Rock
  5. Back in the U.S.S.A.
29. Crocodile Rock/Back in the USSR

== 1990 concert ==
Date	City	Country	Venue
Europe
11 November 1990	London	England	Grosvenor House Hotel

=== Setlist ===
1. Elton's Song
2. Daniel
3. Blue Eyes
4. Tonight
5. Philadelphia Freedom
6. Cry to Heaven
7. Rocket Man (I Think It's Going to Be a Long, Long Time)
8. Sorry Seems to Be the Hardest Word
9. Healing Hands
10. Don't Let the Sun Go Down on Me
11. Bennie and the Jets
12. Candle in the Wind
13. Your Song

== 1993 tour ==
Date	City	Country	Venue
North America
30 September 1993	Fort Pierce	United States	Sunrise Theatre
1 October 1993	Fort Pierce	United States	Sunrise Theatre
2 October 1993	Fort Pierce	United States	Sunrise Theatre
5 October 1993	New Orleans	United States	Lakefront Arena
6 October 1993	Baton Rouge	United States	Louisiana State University
8 October 1993	The Woodlands	United States	Cynthia Woods Mitchell Pavilion
9 October 1993	The Woodlands	United States	Cynthia Woods Mitchell Pavilion
10 October 1993	Dallas	United States	Starplex Amphitheater
13 October 1993	Toledo	United States	Centennial Hall
15 October 1993	Ann Arbor	United States	Hill Auditorium
16 October 1993	East Lansing	United States	Breslin Student Events Center
17 October 1993	Cincinnati	United States	Riverfront Coliseum
20 October 1993	New Haven	United States	New Haven Coliseum
22 October 1993	Amherst	United States	Mullins Center
23 October 1993	Providence	United States	Providence Civic Center
24 October 1993	Portland	United States	Cumberland County Civic Center
South Africa
6 December 1993	Johannesburg	South Africa	Sun City Superbowl
7 December 1993	Johannesburg	South Africa	Sun City Superbowl
9 December 1993	Johannesburg	South Africa	Sun City Superbowl
10 December 1993	Johannesburg	South Africa	Sun City Superbowl

=== Setlist ===
Standard setlist
1. Your Song
2. Skyline Pigeon
3. Sixty Years On
4. I Need You to Turn To
5. The Greatest Discovery
6. Talking Old Soldiers
7. Sacrifice
8. I Don't Wanna Go on with You Like That
9. Mona Lisas and Mad Hatters
10. A Woman's Needs
11. Where to Now St. Peter
12. The North
13. The One
14. Funeral for a Friend/Tonight
15. Better Off Dead
16. Idol
17. Levon
18. Indian Sunset
19. I Think I'm Going to Kill Myself
20. Take Me to the Pilot
21. Don't Let the Sun Go Down on Me
22. Crazy Water
23. We All Fall in Love Sometimes
24. Curtains
25. Crocodile Rock
26. Bennie and the Jets
27. Pinball Wizard
28. Candle in the Wind

== 1994 tour ==
Date	City	Country	Venue
North America
9 September 1994	Phoenix	United States	Talking Stick Resort Arena
10 September 1994	Paradise	United States	MGM Grand Garden Arena
13 September 1994	Englewood	United States	Fiddler's Green Amphitheatre
16 September 1994	San Jose	United States	SAP Center
17 September 1994	Anaheim	United States	Honda Center
19 September 1994	Los Angeles	United States	Greek Theatre
20 September 1994	Los Angeles	United States	Greek Theatre
21 September 1994	Los Angeles	United States	Greek Theatre
22 September 1994	Los Angeles	United States	Greek Theatre
Europe
11 November 1994	Paris	France	Le Zénith
12 November 1994	Paris	France	Le Zénith
14 November 1994	Paris	France	Le Zénith
15 November 1994	Paris	France	Le Zénith
17 November 1994	Paris	France	Le Zénith
18 November 1994	Paris	France	Le Zénith
20 November 1994	Milan	Italy	Mediolanum Forum
22 November 1994	Rome	Italy	PalaLottomatica
27 November 1994	London	England	Royal Albert Hall
28 November 1994	London	England	Royal Albert Hall
30 November 1994	London	England	Royal Albert Hall
1 December 1994	London	England	Royal Albert Hall
3 December 1994	London	England	Royal Albert Hall
4 December 1994	London	England	Royal Albert Hall
5 December 1994	London	England	Royal Albert Hall
7 December 1994	London	England	Royal Albert Hall
8 December 1994	London	England	Royal Albert Hall
10 December 1994	London	England	Royal Albert Hall
11 December 1994	London	England	Royal Albert Hall
12 December 1994	London	England	Royal Albert Hall

=== Setlist ===
Standard setlist
1. Your Song
2. Skyline Pigeon
3. Sixty Years On
4. I Need You to Turn To
5. The Greatest Discovery
6. Talking Old Soldiers
7. Ticking
8. I Don't Wanna Go on With You Like That
9. Mona Lisas and Mad Hatters
10. Believe
11. Live Like Horses
12. Where to Now St. Peter?
13. Sacrifice
14. The One
15. The Last Song
16. Funeral for a Friend/Tonight
17. Better Off Dead
18. Idol
19. Levon
20. Indian Sunset
21. I Think I'm Going to Kill Myself
22. Daniel
23. Sorry Seems to Be the Hardest Word
24. Take Me to the Pilot
25. Don't Let the Sun Go Down on Me
26. Crocodile Rock
27. Bennie and the Jets
28. Can You Feel the Love Tonight

== 1995 tour ==
Date	City	Country	Venue
Asia
6 February 1995	Osaka	Japan	Osaka-jō Hall
7 February 1995	Fukuoka	Japan	Kokusai Center
9 February 1995	Nagoya	Japan	Century Hall
11 February 1995	Osaka	Japan	Osaka-jō Hall
12 February 1995	Tokyo	Japan	Nippon Budokan
14 February 1995	Tokyo	Japan	Nippon Budokan
15 February 1995	Tokyo	Japan	Nippon Budokan
16 February 1995	Tokyo	Japan	Nippon Budokan

=== Setlist ===
Standard setlist
1. Your Song
2. Skyline Pigeon
3. Sixty Years On
4. The Greatest Discovery
5. Talking Old Soldiers
6. Ticking
7. I Don't Wanna Go on with You Like That
8. Mona Lisas and Mad Hatters
9. Believe
10. Live Like Horses
11. Sacrifice
12. The One
13. The Last Song
14. Funeral for a Friend / Tonight
15. Better Off Dead
16. Idol
17. Levon
18. Indian Sunset
19. Daniel
20. Sorry Seems to Be the Hardest Word
21. Take Me to the Pilot
22. Don't Let the Sun Go Down on Me
23. Can You Feel the Love Tonight
24. Bennie and the Jets
25. Candle in the Wind

== 2009 tour ==
Date	City	Country	Venue
Europe
22 September 2009	London	England	Royal Albert Hall
24 September 2009	Nantes	France	Zénith Nantes Métropole
26 September 2009	Amnéville	France	Galaxie Amnéville
27 September 2009	Grenoble	France	Palais des Sports
29 September 2009	Milan	Italy	Mediolanum Forum
30 September 2009	Toulouse	France	Le Zénith de Toulouse
2 October 2009	Paris	France	Palais des congrès de Paris

=== Setlist ===
Standard setlist
1. The One
2. Sixty Years On
3. The Greatest Discovery
4. Border Song
5. Ballad of the Boy in the Red Shoes
6. The Emperor's New Clothes
7. Weight of the World
8. Rocket Man
9. American Triangle
10. Skyline Pigeon
11. Nikita
12. Tiny Dancer
13. Original Sin
14. Your Song
15. Funeral for a Friend/Tonight
16. Better Off Dead
17. Come Down in Time
18. Levon
19. Indian Sunset
20. I Think I'm Going to Kill Myself
21. Daniel
22. Sorry Seems to Be the Hardest Word
23. Take Me to the Pilot
24. Carla/Etude
25. Blessed
26. Don't Let the Sun Go Down on Me
27. Honky Cat
28. Crazy Water
  Encore
29. Saturday Night's Alright for Fighting

== 2010 tour ==
Date	City	Country	Venue
North America
6 January 2010	Honolulu	United States	Neal S. Blaisdell Center
9 January 2010	Honolulu	United States	Neal S. Blaisdell Center
Africa
21 March 2010	Johannesburg	South Africa	Johannesburg Botanical Garden
24 March 2010	Cape Town	South Africa	Kirstenbosch National Botanical Garden
25 March 2010	Cape Town	South Africa	Kirstenbosch National Botanical Garden
26 March 2010	Port Elizabeth	South Africa	NMMU Sportsfields South Campus
28 March 2010	Cape Town	South Africa	Val De Vie Wine Estate
Europe
2 August 2010^{[A]}	Monte Carlo	Monaco	Sporting Monte-Carlo
3 August 2010^{[A]}	Monte Carlo	Monaco	Sporting Monte-Carlo
4 August 2010^{[A]}	Monte Carlo	Monaco	Sporting Monte-Carlo
5 August 2010^{[A]}	Monte Carlo	Monaco	Sporting Monte-Carlo
6 August 2010^{[A]}	Monte Carlo	Monaco	Sporting Monte-Carlo
17 September 2010	Milan	Italy	Teatro degli Arcimboldi
19 September 2010	Rome	Italy	Parco della Musica
20 September 2010	Rome	Italy	Parco della Musica
22 September 2010	Trani	Italy	Piazza Duomo
23 September 2010	Calabria	Italy	Teatro Politeama
24 September 2010	Sicily	Italy	Teatro Antico
26 September 2010	Floriana	Malta	The Granaries
29 September 2010	Toulon	France	Zénith Oméga de Toulon
2 October 2010	Madrid	Spain	Palacio de Deportes de la Comunidad
1 December 2010	Brussels	Belgium	Forest National
2 December 2010	Kirchberg	Luxembourg	d'Coque
4 December 2010	Gothenburg	Sweden	Scandinavium
5 December 2010	Oslo	Norway	Oslo Spektrum
7 December 2010	Hamburg	Germany	O_{2} World Hamburg
9 December 2010	Herning	Denmark	Jyske Bank Boxen
10 December 2010	Malmö	Sweden	Malmö Arena
12 December 2010	Moscow	Russia	Crocus City Hall
13 December 2010	St. Petersburg	Russia	CKK Arena
15 December 2010	Dublin	Ireland	The O_{2}

Cancellations and rescheduled shows

23 March 2010	Bloemfontein, South Africa	Free State University Cricket Oval	Cancelled
24 March 2010	Durban, South Africa	ICC Arena	Cancelled
23 September 2010	Politeama	Catanzaro, Italy	Postponed to June 2011
17 December 2010	Zenith de Dijon	Dijon, France	Rescheduled to 4 February 2011
18 December 2010	Zenith de Strasbourg	Strasbourg, France	Rescheduled to 5 February 2011
19 December 2010	SEG Geneva Arena	Geneva, Switzerland	Rescheduled to 3 February 2011

=== Setlist ===
Standard setlist
1. The One
2. Sixty Years On
3. The Greatest Discovery
4. Border Song
5. Ballad of the Boy in the Red Shoes
6. When Love is Dying
7. I Guess That's Why They Call It the Blues
8. Rocket Man
9. Nikita
10. Never Too Old (To Hold Somebody)
11. Tiny Dancer
12. Philadelphia Freedom
13. Your Song
14. Funeral for a Friend/Tonight
15. Better Off Dead
16. Levon
17. Gone to Shiloh
18. Indian Sunset
19. I Think I'm Going to Kill Myself
20. Daniel
21. Sorry Seems to Be the Hardest Word
22. Take Me to the Pilot
23. Don't Let the Sun Go Down on Me
24. Bennie and the Jets
25. Crazy Water
  Encore
26. Candle in the Wind

== 2011 tour ==
Date	City	Country	Venue
Europe
28 January 2011	London	England	Royal Opera House
26 May 2011	Geneva	Switzerland	SEG Geneva Arena
27 May 2011	Dijon	France	Zénith de Dijon
28 May 2011	Strasbourg	France	Zénith de Strasbourg

Cancellations and rescheduled shows

26 January 2011	Stade Couvert Regional	Liévin, France	Rescheduled to 24 May 2011
3 February 2011	SEG Geneva Arena	Geneva, Switzerland	Rescheduled to 26 May 2011
4 February 2011	Zénith de Dijon	Dijon, France	Rescheduled to 27 May 2011
5 February 2011	Zénith de Strasbourg	Strasbourg, France	Rescheduled to 28 May 2011
24 May 2011	Stade Couvert Regional	Liévin, France	Cancelled

=== Setlist ===
Standard setlist
1. The One
2. Sixty Years On
3. The Greatest Discovery
4. Border Song
5. Ballad of the Boy in the Red Shoes
6. When Love is Dying
7. I Guess That's Why They Call It the Blues
8. Rocket Man
9. Nikita
10. Never Too Old (To Hold Somebody)
11. Tiny Dancer
12. Philadelphia Freedom
13. Your Song
14. Funeral for a Friend/Tonight
15. Better Off Dead
16. Levon
17. Gone to Shiloh
18. Indian Sunset
19. I Think I'm Going to Kill Myself
20. Daniel
21. Sorry Seems to Be the Hardest Word
22. Take Me to the Pilot
23. Don't Let the Sun Go Down on Me
24. Bennie and the Jets
25. Crazy Water
  Encore
26. Candle in the Wind

== 2012 tour ==
Date	City	Country	Venue
North America
2 March 2012	Mexico City	Mexico	Auditorio Nacional
3 March 2012	Mexico City	Mexico	Auditorio Nacional
Middle East
29 March 2012	Dubai	United Arab Emirates	Yas Arena
Europe
31 March 2012^{[B]}	Tromsø	Norway	Skarphallen Tromsø

Festivals and other miscellaneous performances
^{A} This concert was a part of "Monte-Carlo Sporting Summer Festival"
^{B} This concert was a part of "Døgnvill Vinter Festival"

=== Setlists ===
2 & 3 March 2012 – Mexico City, Mexico
1. "The One"
2. "Sixty Years On"
3. "The Greatest Discovery"
4. "Border Song"
5. "Your Song"
6. "Ballad of the Boy in the Red Shoes"
7. "I Guess That's Why They Call It the Blues"
8. "Rocket Man"
9. "Nikita"
10. "Never Too Old (To Hold Somebody)"
11. "Tiny Dancer"
12. "Philadelphia Freedom"
13. "I'm Still Standing"
14. "Funeral for a Friend/Tonight"
15. "Better Off Dead"
16. "Levon"
17. "Gone to Shiloh"
18. "Indian Sunset"
19. "I Think I'm Going to Kill Myself"
20. "Daniel"
21. "Sorry Seems to Be the Hardest Word"
22. "Take Me to the Pilot"
23. "Don't Let the Sun Go Down on Me"
24. "Bennie and the Jets"
25. "Crazy Water"
  Encore
26. "Candle in the Wind"
29 March 2012 – Dubai, UAE / 31 March 2012 – Tromsø, Norway
1. "The One"
2. "Sixty Years On"
3. "The Greatest Discovery"
4. "Border Song"
5. "Your Song"
6. "I Guess That's Why They Call It the Blues"
7. "Rocket Man"
8. "Nikita"
9. "Honky Cat"
10. "Tiny Dancer"
11. "Philadelphia Freedom"
12. "I'm Still Standing"
13. "Funeral for a Friend / Tonight"
14. "Better Off Dead"
15. "Levon"
16. "Gone to Shiloh"
17. "Indian Sunset"
18. "I Think I'm Going to Kill Myself"
19. "Daniel"
20. "Sorry Seems to Be the Hardest Word"
21. "Bennie and the Jets"
22. "Don't Let the Sun Go Down on Me"
23. "Crazy Water"
  Encore
24. "Crocodile Rock"
25. "Candle in the Wind"

== Box office score data ==
Venue	City	Tickets sold / available	Gross revenue
O_{2} World	Hamburg	5,181 / 7,266 (71%)	$376,769
Neal S. Blaisdell Center	Honolulu	13,880 / 13,880 (100%)	$1,585,873
Auditorio Nacional	Mexico City	18,916 / 19,274 (98%)	$1,542,640
TOTAL		37,977 / 40,420(91%)	$3,505,282
