= New York Groove =

1978 single by Ace Frehley

Single by Hello

from the album Keeps Us Off the Streets
- B-side: "Little Miss Mystery"
- Released: 1975
- Genre: Glam rock
- Length: 3:01
- Label: Bell
- Songwriter: Russ Ballard
- Producer: Mike Leander

Hello singles chronology
"Bend Me, Shape Me" (1975)	"New York Groove" (1975)	"Star Studded Sham" (1976)

"New York Groove"

Single by Ace Frehley/Kiss

from the album Ace Frehley
- B-side: "Snow Blind"
- Released: September 1978
- Studio: Plaza Sound, New York City
- Genre: Glam rock
- Length: 3:01
- Label: Casablanca
- Songwriter: Russ Ballard
- Producers: Eddie Kramer; Ace Frehley

Ace Frehley/Kiss singles chronology
"Radioactive" / "See You in Your Dreams" (1978)	"New York Groove" / "Snow Blind" (1978)	"Don't You Let Me Down" (1978)

"New York Groove" is a song written by the English musician and producer Russ Ballard. The song was originally recorded by the glam rock band Hello in 1975 and was later covered by Ace Frehley, lead guitarist of American rock band Kiss for his 1978 solo album. Frehley's version is arguably the best known, especially in the United States.

== Hello version ==
British glam rock band Hello first recorded the song in 1975, for their debut album, Keeps Us Off the Streets.

The song was a number nine hit in the UK, and subsequently reached number seven in Germany. The song is featured on a radio station and played during the end credits of the 2008 video game Grand Theft Auto IV.

== Ace Frehley version ==
Ace Frehley, best known as the lead guitarist of Kiss, recorded "New York Groove" for his first solo album, Ace Frehley, released in 1978; the album was released concurrently with solo albums from the other three Kiss members: Peter Criss; Gene Simmons; and Paul Stanley. Frehley originally "scoffed" at the idea of the remake, but co-producer Eddie Kramer persisted. It was released as a single and the song made it to No. 13 on the Billboard Hot 100, by far the highest-charting single from any of the four solo albums. Frehley once told Rolling Stone magazine that his unique take on the song was inspired by his experience with hookers in New York City's Times Square in the 1970s.

"New York Groove" was performed on Kiss's tours of 1979 and 1980, and became a staple of Frehley's shows during his solo tours in the 1980s and 1990s, and again during the Reunion Tour when he rejoined Kiss in 1996.

A live version of the song can be found on the Japanese CD and American vinyl re-releases of the Kiss album You Wanted the Best, You Got the Best!! (1996), which was originally recorded in Sydney, Australia in 1980. It is one of the few officially released Kiss live recordings to feature drummer Eric Carr.

=== Personnel on Ace Frehley version ===
- Ace Frehley – lead vocals, guitars, bass
- Anton Fig – drums, percussion
- David Lasley, Don Yowell and Susan Collins – backing vocals
- Bobby McAdams – power mouth (talk box)

== Chart history ==
=== Hello original ===
Chart (1975–1976)	Peak position
Austria (Ö3 Austria Top 40)	10
Germany (GfK)	7
UK Singles (Official Charts)	9

=== Ace Frehley cover ===
==== Weekly charts ====
Chart (1978–1979)	Peak position
Australian Singles (Kent Music Report)	29
Canada Top Singles (RPM)	25
New Zealand (Recorded Music NZ)	24
South Africa (Springbok Radio)	4
US Billboard Hot 100	13

==== Year-end charts ====
Chart (1979)	Peak position
Canada Top Singles (RPM)	175
US Top Pop Singles (Billboard)	60
