= Then He Kissed Me =

1963 single by the Crystals

Single by the Crystals

from the album Philles Records Presents Today's Hits
- B-side: "Brother Julius"
- Released: July 12, 1963
- Recorded: 1963
- Studio: Gold Star, Los Angeles
- Genre: Brill Building
- Length: 2:35
- Label: Philles
- Songwriters: Phil Spector; Ellie Greenwich; Jeff Barry
- Producer: Phil Spector

The Crystals singles chronology
"Da Doo Ron Ron" (1963)	"Then He Kissed Me" (1963)	"Little Boy" (1964)

"Then He Kissed Me" is a song recorded by American girl group the Crystals and written by Phil Spector, Ellie Greenwich and Jeff Barry. The lyrics are a narrative of a young woman's encounter, romance, and eventual engagement with a young man. The original Spector-produced recording was released by Philles Records in mid-1963 and reached number 6 in the U.S. and number 2 in the UK. It was the Crystals' third single to chart in the top ten in the U.S., and their second to reach the top ten in the UK.

The song has been recorded by many other artists, including Martha Reeves & the Vandellas, Gary Glitter, and Kiss. The Beach Boys' version was produced by Brian Wilson and initially released on their 1965 album Summer Days (And Summer Nights!!) before being issued as a UK-only single in April 1967, peaking there at number four.

In 2004, "Then He Kissed Me" was ranked number 493 on Rolling Stone magazine's list of 500 Greatest Songs of All Time. Pitchfork placed it at number 18 on its list of "The 200 Greatest Songs of the 1960s". Billboard named the song number 8 on their list of 100 Greatest Girl Group Songs of All Time.

== Background and recording ==
Spector produced the recording at Gold Star Studios in July 1963. The lead vocal was sung by Dolores "LaLa" Brooks, the Wall of Sound arrangement was by Jack Nitzsche, featuring The Wrecking Crew, and Larry Levine was the engineer.

Levine stated that the song's pronounced echo effect had resulted from a technical mishap; in attempting to satisfy Spector's demand for higher playback volume, Levine duplicated the track across both stereo channels before mixing down to mono. During this process, he inadvertently retained echo on both channels, resulting in a doubled reverberation: "Phil liked it, and from then on I knew how to get as much echo as Phil wanted".

Cash Box described it as "a captivating, quick moving, full sounding romantic that sports a sensational arrangement by Jack 'Specs' Nitzsche."

== The Beach Boys version ==
"Then I Kissed Her"
- 1965 German single cover

Single by the Beach Boys

from the album Summer Days (And Summer Nights!!)
- B-side: "Mountain of Love"
- Released: July 5, 1965 (UK Summer Days (And Summer Nights!!) album); April 28, 1967 (UK single)
- Recorded: May 3, 1965
- Studio: Western, Hollywood
- Genre: Rock
- Length: 2:15
- Label: Capitol
- Songwriters: Phil Spector; Ellie Greenwich; Jeff Barry
- Producer: Brian Wilson

Licensed audio
- "Then I Kissed Her" on YouTube

Retitled "Then I Kissed Her", the Beach Boys released their version on their 1965 album Summer Days (And Summer Nights!!) with Al Jardine on lead vocals and production by Brian Wilson. Beyond title and gender changes, new lyrics were written retelling the story of the Crystals' song from the boyfriend's point of view.

In April 1967, the band's version was released as a single in the UK, appearing as a stop-gap release while work continued on the "Heroes and Villains" single. This was reportedly done against the band's wishes; Beach Boys band member Mike Love commented on May 7, 1967, "The record company didn't even have the decency to put out one of Brian’s own compositions. The reason for the hold up with a new single has simply been that we wanted to give our public the best and the best isn't ready yet."

"Then I Kissed Her" charted at No. 4 in the UK. The B-side of the single was "Mountain of Love", a song off the band's 1965 Beach Boys' Party! album.

=== Personnel ===
Personnel sourced from Craig Slowinski.

The Beach Boys

- Al Jardine – lead vocals
- Bruce Johnston – Hammond B-3 organ, castanets
- Mike Love – harmony and backing vocals
- Brian Wilson – harmony and backing vocals, bass guitar, grand piano, timpani
- Carl Wilson – harmony and backing vocals, electric and 12-string acoustic guitars
- Dennis Wilson – drums

Session musicians and production staff

- Ron Swallow – tambourine

== Other versions ==
- Martha Reeves & the Vandellas covered the song later that year on their 1963 album Heat Wave.
- Yugoslav band Crveni Koralji released a Serbo-Croatian version of the song, entitled "Dok je drugi ljubi" ("While Someone Else Is Kissing Her"), on their 1964 debut EP Najljepši san (The Most Beautiful Dream).
- Sonny&Cher recorded "Then He Kissed Me" as a track from their "LOOK AT US" album 1965.
- British band Hello included a cover titled "Then She Kissed Me" on their 1976 debut album Keeps Us Off the Streets. The version appears in season 3, episode 1 of Sex Education.
- Kiss released a version, retitled "Then She Kissed Me", as the final track on their 1977 album Love Gun.
- Gary Glitter released a version as a single in 1981, retitled "And Then She Kissed Me", which reached number 39 on the UK Singles Chart.
- German disco group Ebony recorded a version of the song in 1978. It was released on Aladin 1C 006-32 779 and EMI Electrola 1C 006-32 779 that year.
- Juice Newton cover titled "(And) Then He Kissed Me" on their June 1989 album Ain't Gonna Cry.
- St. Vincent reimagined this as a sapphic love song as part of Legacy Records' Universal Love – Wedding Songs Reimagined
- Bruce Springsteen and the E Street Band performed a cover of the song to open their set at the Scottrade Center in St. Louis, Missouri, on 23 August 2008. This performance was later released as part of the official Bruce Springsteen Archives series.
- Iranian artist Afshin Moghaddam has performed a non-english cover of the song called "Asheghaneh".

== In popular culture ==
The Crystals' recording has appeared in the films Goodfellas, Adventures in Babysitting, Long Shot, and Melania. It was also played in the opening scene of the 2020 film To All the Boys: P.S. I Still Love You.

Multiple Songs borrow or have a sound similar to the "Then He Kissed Me"' riff, these include The Ohio Express 1968 song "Chewy Chewy" & The Who's Tommy album track "Smash The Mirror"

== Charts ==
=== Weekly charts ===
The Crystals version
Chart (1963)	Peak position
Australia (Go-Set)	9
Ireland (The Irish Times)	3
New Zealand (Lever Hit Parade)	5
Norway (Verdens Gang)	8
UK Singles Chart	2
U.S. Billboard Hot 100	6
U.S. Cash Box Top 100	6

The Beach Boys version
Chart (1967)	Peak position
Finland (Soumen Virallinen)	16
Dutch Top 40	2
German Singles Chart	39
Irish Singles Chart	4
Norwegian Singles Chart	10
UK Singles Chart	4

=== Year-end charts ===
The Crystals version
Chart (1963)	Rank
US Billboard Hot 100	68
US Cash Box	98

According to contemporary national charts sourced and cited by Billboard in 1967, the Beach Boys' version reached No. 2 in Sweden and South Africa and No. 9 in Belgium. It was No. 12 in Australia's Go Set chart and No. 6 in New Zealand.
