= Exodus Tour =

1977 concert tour by Bob Marley & The Wailers

- Tour by Bob Marley and the Wailers
- Poster to the concert in Paris, France
- Associated album: Exodus
- Start date: 10 May 1977
- End date: 4 June 1977
- Legs: 1
- No. of shows: 15 in Europe

Bob Marley and the Wailers concert chronology
- Rastaman Vibration Tour (1976); Exodus Tour (1977); Kaya Tour (1978)

The Exodus Tour was a concert tour organised to support the album Exodus by Bob Marley and the Wailers.

The tour began at the Pavillon de Paris, Porte de Pantin in Paris, France, on 10 May 1977. During the tour, Marley performed for the first time in Belgium and Denmark. The tour ended in early June after four of the six shows planned at the Rainbow Theatre in London due to a serious toe injury Marley received in a football friendly game with French journalists just before the tour's start. The tour's second leg in the United States was first postponed and then cancelled.

The final show has been released on VHS and DVD, labeled Live! at the Rainbow. It is reported that all four London shows have been recorded. The cancellation of the U.S. leg has been suggested as the main reason for Marley's underrated reputation there, as the Exodus album was Marley's route to international superstardom; being honoured as the Greatest Album of the Century by Time in 2000.

On 12 June 2020 all four Rainbow concerts were officially released as a streaming/download only series of albums.

== Setlist ==
The standard setlist of the tour was the following:

- "Natural Mystic"
- "So Much Things to Say"
- "Guiltiness"
- "Trenchtown Rock"
- "Them Belly Full (But We Hungry)"
- "Concrete Jungle"
- "I Shot the Sheriff"
- "Rebel Music (3 O'Clock Roadblock)"
- "Lively Up Yourself"
- "Crazy Baldhead" / "Running Away" (medley)
- "War" / "No More Trouble" (medley)
- "The Heathen"
- "Burnin' & Lootin'"
- "Positive Vibration"
- "No Woman, No Cry"
- "Jamming"
- "Get Up, Stand Up"
- "Exodus"

The militant songs from the first side of the Exodus album had all been performed at least once before the tour, whilst performances of the soft love songs from the second side remained widely rare; only "Jammin'" had been performed a few times and later became a classic Marley tune and a standard of later tours. "Waiting in Vain" and "One Love / People Get Ready" had been performed at least once during the Kaya Tour in 1978, as had "Three Little Birds" at least once during the Uprising Tour in 1980). The tour featured performances of two songs which are not featured on any of previous Island albums: "Trenchtown Rock" (an early pre-Island song) and "Running Away" (a song released on the 1978 album Kaya).

During some shows, an additional song was added to the middle of the setlist (especially during the Rainbow Theatre shows when Marley widely varied the setlists), like "Stir It Up" "Jammin'", "Positive Vibration", "Concrete Jungle", "Crazy Baldhead", "Running Away", "Trenchtown Rock", "Natural Mystic", "So Much Things To Say" and "Guiltiness". Live performances of each of these songs happened very rarely during the tour. In 2020, the final concert was released on Marley's official YouTube channel.

== Tour dates ==
Date	City	Country	Venue	Notes
10 May 1977	Paris	France	Pavillon de Paris	
11 May 1977	Brussels	Belgium	Forest National	
13 May 1977	The Hague	Netherlands	Houtrust Hallen	
15 May 1977	Munich	West Germany	Circus Krone	
16 May 1977	Heidelberg	West Germany	Rhein-Neckar-Halle	
17 May 1977	Hamburg	West Germany	Congress Centrum Hamburg	
18 May 1977	West Berlin	West Germany	Eissporthalle an der Jafféstraße	
20 May 1977	Stockholm	Sweden	Gröna Lund	
22 May 1977	Copenhagen	Denmark	Folketeatret	
23 May 1977	Gothenburg	Sweden	Scandinavium	
May 1977	London	England	Top of the Pops	BBC TV program
1 June 1977	London	England	Rainbow Theatre	
2 June 1977	London	England	Rainbow Theatre	
3 June 1977	London	England	Rainbow Theatre	
4 June 1977	London	England	Rainbow Theatre	

== Cancellations ==
- 5 June 1977: London, United Kingdom
- 6 June 1977: London, United Kingdom
