= The Glitter Band =

English glam rock band

- Also known as: The G Band (1976–1977); Air Traffic Control (1977–1979)
- Origin: United Kingdom
- Genres: Glam rock; rock and roll; pop
- Years active: 1973–present
- Labels: Bell; CBS; Epic; Cherry Red
- Members: Pete Phipps; Dominic Rodgers; John Springate
- Past members: Gerry Shephard; Tony Leonard; John Rossall; Harvey Ellison; Eddy Spence; Pete Gill; Lennie Clayton; Roger Saunders; Bill Phillips; Tony Catchpole; Roger Carey; Merilyn Bear; Barry Haywood; Brian Jones; Marc Pearson
- Website: theglitterband.co.uk

The Glitter Band are an English glam rock band, who initially worked as Gary Glitter's backing band under that name from 1973, when they then began releasing records of their own. They were unofficially known as the Glittermen on the first four hit singles by Gary Glitter from 1972 to 1973.

The Glitter Band had seven UK top 20 hit singles in the mid-1970s, and three hit albums.

== Early career and commercial success ==
When Gary Glitter's first single "Rock and Roll Parts 1 and 2" became a number 2 hit in the UK, his manager Mike Leander realised that he would need a backing band and contacted John Rossall who was then the musical director of the Boston Showband. With a few changes in personnel, the Boston Showband became the Glittermen, and later the Glitter Band in 1973 who were: John Rossall (trombone and musical director), Gerry Shephard (lead guitar and vocals), Pete Phipps (drums and keyboards), Tony Leonard (drums), John Springate (bass and vocals) and Harvey Ellison (saxophone). They backed Glitter in live performances, although in the studio Mike Leander played all the instruments, apart from the brass section provided by Rossall and Ellison.

In 1973, Rossall approached Leander with the suggestion that the band record some material without Glitter. Leander agreed, but rejected the first recordings. The band then went back into the studio and recorded the Rossall/Shephard composition "Angel Face", which met with Leander's approval, but not without some changes. The band, now working as a separate entity with Tony Leonard having replaced Pete Gill, as well as continuing to back Glitter, played a few well-received live shows before their first single came out, mixing some new songs with cover versions of 1950s and 1960s songs. In March 1974, "Angel Face" was released on Bell Records, reaching number four in the UK Singles Chart, and outselling Gary Glitter's "Remember Me This Way" that week, though "Remember Me This Way" ultimately peaked higher at number 3. Further hits followed between 1974 and 1976, along with the release of four albums. Rossall left the band on 31 December 1974, with Gerry Shephard, John Springate and Pete Phipps taking over leadership of the band, and Springate taking lead vocal duties on hits such as the ballad "Goodbye My Love", "The Tears I Cried", and "People Like You". Soon after performing on Gary Glitter's "final live tour" in 1976, sales for the Glitter Band dropped, with the decline of glam rock and the advent of punk rock. The band switched to CBS Records and later Epic Records, and changed their name to the G Band to disassociate themselves from Glitter, but failed to find another hit single. The band reverted to the Glitter Band name in March 1977 for the release of "Look What You've Been Missing", co-written by John Rossall and Gerry Shephard.

May 1977 saw the band release a final single in the 1970s as the Glitter Band, "She Was Alright". Finally Springate, Phipps and Shephard released "Gotta Get a Message Back To You" in September 1977, under the new band name of Air Traffic Control. The single, written by Springate and Phipps, never made it past a few initial commercial pressings on the Epic label. In 1979, Shephard and Phipps worked with former Sparks keyboard player Peter Oxendale, recording the US only album Put Your Money Where Your Mouth Is as Oxendale and Shephard. They regrouped as the Glitter Band in 1980 with the addition of Eddy Spence on keyboards and Brian Jones replacing Harvey on sax. Further sporadic releases followed in the 1980s on a variety of labels. Trevor Horn played bass guitar for the band in this era. The band's profile was maintained with a slew of Greatest Hits releases, mainly concentrating on their peak mid-1970s era.

== Reformation ==
Guitarist/singer Gerry Shephard and drummer/pianist Pete Phipps reformed the band in 1987, and successfully performed in the UK and Europe, including tours with Gary Glitter, until 2001 when they split up. Bassist/singer John Springate had joined them on most tours from 1991 to 1996. After the split in 2001, Shephard and former drummer Tony Leonard formed one band, whilst Phipps continued to perform with his own band. After Rossall was taken to court in 1983, an injunction banned him from using Glitter in his band name; a second legal ruling in 1997, after Rossall had persistently breached the first order, resulted in him receiving a one-year suspended prison sentence which would come into force if he used the Glitter name again. Rossall was subsequently not allowed to use Glitter Band as part of his band's name, but was allowed to advertise his historical connections to the band. With Shephard's death in May 2003, Leonard retired to concentrate on musical production activities in Norway, whilst both Phipps and Rossall continued on the road with their own bands. Shephard and Phipps had previously guested on Denim's Back in Denim (1992).

== Later career ==
Pete Phipps still performs live as the Glitter Band. In April 2010, the Glitter Band performed at Scala, King's Cross, London, where they were joined by special guests Angie Bowie and Adam Ant. Rossall and Harvey Ellison continued to tour with their band, releasing the album Glitteresque in 2008, which was subsequently withdrawn from circulation by their record company because of trademark infringement. Following Ellison's death in 2017, Rossall continued to tour for the rest of his life.

Springate and Shephard also wrote the UK's 2000 Eurovision Song Contest entry, "Don't Play That Song Again" performed by Nicki French.

Phipps and Shephard appeared in the Identity Parade line-up on the first episode of Never Mind The Buzzcocks, recorded on 28 October 1996.

In December 2013, John Rossall released a new single, a Glitter styled version of the classic "White Christmas". In 2014 the song "Angel Face" was included on the soundtrack of the hit Spanish film The Face of an Angel.

Springate retired from the band in 2019, and in August 2020 Phipps, the only remaining original member, released his first solo album entitled Wherever You Are.

John Rossall died on 2 October 2021, at the age of 75.

== Discography ==
=== Albums ===
- Hey (1974) UK No. 13, AUS No. 16
- Rock 'n' Roll Dudes (1975) UK No. 17, AUS No. 35
- Listen to the Band (1975)
- Makes You Blind (1975), Arista (same songs as Listen to the Band) released outside UK
- Paris Match (1977)

Live albums

- Live at the Marquee (1986)
- Glitz Blitz, Live! (1998), MCI
- Greatest Hits ...Live! (2001), Armoury

Compilations

- Greatest Hits (1976) UK No. 52
- The Collection (1990)
- Pop Fire (1994), Pilz
- Let's Get Together Again (1996)
- 20 Glittering Greats (1998), Music Club
- Solid Silver: The Ultimate Glitter Band Vol. 1 (1998), Edsel
- The Best of the Glitter Band (1999)
- The Glitter Band: The Bell Singles Collection (2000)
- Greatest Hits (2002)
- The Glitter Band: The Albums (2016) – A boxset containing The Glitter Band's four studio albums
- The Glitter Band: Complete Singles Collection (2021) – A three-disc set from The Glitter Band, featuring every A and B side from 1974 to 1984, two reworkings of "Angel Face" from 1989 (i.e. "Angel Face" 1989, "Angel Face (Choir of Angels Version!)"), six rare bonus studio tracks from the early 1980s, a John Springate solo song from 1985 called "Boys Love Rock and Roll", and The Glitter Band's Live at the Marquee live concert from 1985.

=== Singles ===
Year	Title	UK	AUS
1974	"Angel Face"	4	15
1974	"Just for You"	10	-
1974	"Let's Get Together Again"	8	-
1975	"Goodbye My Love"	2	83
1975	"The Tears I Cried (Titled "Cry" in Aussie)"	8	7
1975	"Love in the Sun"	15	-
1975	"Alone Again"	-	-
1976	"People Like You and People Like Me"	5	-
1976	"Don't Make Promises"^{a}	-	-
1976	"Lay Your Love on Me"^{a}	-	-
1976	"Makes You Blind"^{a}	-	-
1977	"Look What You've Been Missing"	-	-
1977	"She Was Alright"	-	-
1977	"I've Gotta Get a Message Back to You"^{b}	-	-
1981	"Until the Next Time"	-	-
1982	"Heartbeat to Heartache"	-	-
1984	"Nothing at All"	-	-
1985	"Until the Next Time" (Re-issue)	-	-
1989	"Angel Face 1989" (1989 Re-recording)	-	-

=== Notes ===
- ^a These singles were released under the band name "The G Band"
- ^b This single was released under the band name "Air Traffic Control"

== Members ==
=== Current ===
- John Springate – bass, lead and backing vocals (1973–1979, 1981–1987, 1991–1996, 2009–2019, 2024–present)
- Pete Phipps – drums, keyboards (1973–1979, 1985–present)
- Dominic Rodgers – guitar (2001–present)

=== Former ===
- John Rossall – trombone, saxophone (1973–1974; died 2021)
- Harvey Ellison – saxophone, guitar, piano, backing vocals (1973–1977; died 2017)
- Pete Gill – drums (1973)
- Bob Edmunds – saxophone (1973–74)
- Gerry Shephard – guitar, lead and backing vocals (1973–1979, 1981–2001) (born 1951 – died 2003)
- Tony Leonard – drums (1973–1977, 1981–1985)
- Eddy Spence – keyboards (1981–1987, 2009–2019)
- Brian Jones – saxophone (1981–1985)
- Terry Popple – drums (1981–1983)

== Film appearances ==
- Remember Me This Way (1974), as themselves
- Never Too Young to Rock (1975), as themselves
