= Tell Him (Bert Berns song) =

1962 song by Bert Berns performed first by the Exciters

Single by The Exciters

from the album Tell Him
- B-side: "Hard Way to Go"
- Released: October 18, 1962
- Recorded: October 1962
- Studio: Bell Sound Studios, New York City, New York
- Genre: Pop
- Length: 2:21
- Label: United Artists
- Songwriter: Bert Berns
- Producer: Jerry Leiber and Mike Stoller

The Exciters singles chronology
"Tell Him" (1962)	"He's Got the Power" (1963)

"Tell Him", originally "Tell Her", is a 1962 song that was written and composed by Bert Berns, using the pen name Bert Russell, and which was popularized through its recording by the Exciters. The song was recorded as "Tell Her" by Dean Parrish in 1966, and Kenny Loggins in 1989. Billboard named the Exciters version at No. 95 on their list of 100 Greatest Girl Group Songs of All Time. According to Jason Ankeny at AllMusic, the Exciters' version of "Tell Him" "...boasted an intensity that signified a sea change in the presentation and perception of femininity in popular music, paving the way for such tough, sexy acts as the Shangri-Las and the Ronettes."

== Early recordings ==
The song was first recorded in 1962 as "Tell Her", by Gil Hamilton, aka Johnny Thunder, with Berns producing. "Tell Her" was also a single for Ed Townsend in 1962, before Jerry Leiber and Mike Stoller produced the version by the Exciters, released as "Tell Him" in October 1962. "Tell Him" reached No. 4 on the Billboard Hot 100 dated 26 January 1963. A No. 5 R&B hit in the United States, "Tell Him" was No. 1 in France for two weeks, reached No. 5 in Australia, and No. 12 in Canada.

In the UK, the Exciters' single peaked at No. 46, whilst a cover version by Billie Davis reached No. 10. In Chile, Davis' version peaked at No. 1. Another UK cover version by Alma Cogan did not appear in the UK Singles Chart, but it became the singer's breakout hit in Sweden with a No. 10 peak. In the Netherlands, the Exciters', Billie Davis's, and Alma Cogan's respective singles of "Tell Him" charted in tandem with a peak at No. 17. Cogan also recorded five alternate versions of "Tell Him", with lyrics in German, Japanese, Italian, Spanish and French; her French rendition of "Tell Him" reached No. 53 in France, where the Exciters' version reached No. 1. Although Billie Davis' version was also more popular in Argentina, the song had previously been recorded under the name "Dile", performed by the singer Juan Ramón in 1962. A year later, in 1963, Luis Aguilé recorded it, who emigrated to Spain and had resounding success with this song in that country.

Dusty Springfield, en route to Nashville in 1962 to make a country music album with the Springfields, was on a stop-over in New York City when she heard the Exciters' "Tell Him" playing while taking a late night walk by the Colony Record Store on Broadway. The experience persuaded Springfield to embark on a solo career with a pop/soul direction. She would recall: “The Exciters sort of got you by the throat...out of the blue comes blasting at you 'I know something about love,' and that’s it. That’s what I wanna do.”

In 1983, the Exciters' version of "Tell Him" was featured on the soundtrack for the Lawrence Kasdan film The Big Chill. In 1988, it was featured in the Canadian drama Something About Love, and in 1997, it was included on the soundtrack for the film My Best Friend's Wedding.

In 2009, the Exciters' version of "Tell Him" was included on the soundtrack for the DreamWorks Animation film Monsters vs. Aliens. In 2016, it was also featured in 10 Cloverfield Lane.

== Later recordings ==
In 1963, the song was covered as "Dis-lui" (literally "Tell Her") by French pop singer Claude François, reaching No. 1 in the French chart. The song was also covered by Sonny & Cher on their 1966 album The Wondrous World of Sonny & Chér.

"Tell Him" had its highest UK chart hit, No. 6 via a 1974 remake by Hello, whose producer Mike Leander had cut an earlier version with the Glitter Band, which he felt could be improved upon. Hello's "Tell Him" also hit No. 12 in Ireland, No. 32 in Germany and No. 36 in Australia. "Tell Him" would return to the UK Singles Chart in 1996 when Caroline Quentin and Leslie Ash, who co-starred in the series Men Behaving Badly, hit No. 25 with their remake, credited to 'Quentin and Ash'.

In the United States, "Tell Him" has reappeared on the Hot 100 twice, both times as "Tell Her;" first in 1966 by Dean Parrish, which peaked at No. 97, and then in 1989 by Kenny Loggins, which peaked at No. 76. Linda Ronstadt covered it on her 1982 album, Get Closer.

Vonda Shepard made a version of "Tell Him", which was part of the soundtrack of the television series Ally McBeal and appeared on her 1998 album Songs from Ally McBeal.

Bette Midler also covered the song on her 2014 album, It's the Girls!.

== See also ==
- List of 1960s one-hit wonders in the United States
