= Remember Me This Way (film) =

- DVD
- Directed by: Bob Foster; Ron Inkpen
- Written by: Bob Foster; Ron Inkpen
- Produced by: Lawrence Myers
- Starring: Gary Glitter
- Production companies: GTO Films, Rock Artistes Management
- Distributed by: GTO Films
- Release date: 1974
- Running time: 57 minutes
- Country: United Kingdom
- Language: English

Remember Me This Way is a 1974 British documentary film directed and written by Bob Foster and Ron Inkpen, about the British glam rock star Gary Glitter. A soundtrack album was also released.

== Premise ==
The documentary follows Glitter through a routine of press conferences, radio interviews, photo shoots and concert rehearsals. It also includes his audition to star in an unproduced feature film.

The picture also documents the people working behind the scenes of Glitter's career. It shows them pressing copies of his records, and attending meetings where Bell Records staff discuss Glitter's record sales and arrangements for his concerts.

The movie follows Glitter and his entourage through to a sell-out concert at the Rainbow Theatre in London, and features songs from the show.

== Reception ==
=== Box office ===
The film was a box office success at the time.

=== Critical ===
The Monthly Film Bulletin wrote: "An aptly titled piece of merchandising, Remember Me This Way is a promotion film for pop star Gary Glitter and his new album (recorded live at the concert which is the film's climax) thinly disguised as a documentary. ... Any depth or insight into the difficulties (as opposed to the complexities) of creating and maintaining a saleable image is strictly avoided in a series of simple, image-building scenes: a very unconvincing screen test which has Glitter, in slow-motion, kung-fu style, destroying some attackers, and the star posing in a collection of progressively more outrageous costumes. The interviews with Glitter and the scenes where his management team plan their promotional campaign are all marred by the extreme self-consciousness of the participants. ... Certainly his appeal would not appear to be sexual (as, say, David Cassidy's is), for when he gyrates across the stage – which he does often and with great output of energy – he resembles a graceless, plump, outlandishly dressed and even more frenetic Jagger. The final shot says it all: Glitter's face in close-up fills the left of the frame singing "Remember Me This Way", while a series of stills of the star in action slowly replace one another on the right-hand side, all beautifully designed to create and further the image."

The Scotsman described the film as a "ghastly mock documentary ... wherein Glitter appears as a wheezing, paunchy narcissist with as much glamour and sophistication as the average pot noodle. It was his only film.

== Home media ==
The film was issued on VHS in the 1980s, and a DVD release followed in 2005.
