= John Springate =

English musician (born 1949)

- Born: John Terrence Springate; 1 February 1949 (age 77); Kidbrooke, London, England
- Occupations: Singer; musician; songwriter; record producer
- Instrument: Bass guitar
- Years active: 1970s–present
- Labels: Handbag Music; Terrific; Towerbell; Sedition; Epic
- Member of: Clem Curtis & the Foundations; The Glitter Band; Air Traffic Control; Side Walk
- Website: johnspringate.com

John Terrence Springate (born 1 February 1949) is an English singer, musician, songwriter and record producer. He was the bass player and sometimes lead singer of the Glitter Band.

== Career ==
=== 1970s ===
In the early period of his career, John Springate played with Johnny Johnson and the Bandwagon and Clem Curtis & The Foundations.

Springate sang lead on the Glitter Band single "The Tears I Cried" which Gerry Shephard wrote. It was released in March 1975. He also co-wrote, with Shephard, "Don't Make Promises (You Can't Keep)" for the band.

=== 1980s to 1990s ===
Together with Mike Leander he produced "A Little Boogie Woogie (In the Back of My Mind)" which was recorded by Shakin' Stevens and released in 1987. He and Leander also co-produced Stevens' album Let's Boogie which was released the same year.

He wrote and produced Kelly Wilde's single, "Nothing But Promises" which was released on BOLTS 15/7 in March, 1988. On the week of May 14, 1988, the record debuted in the HI-NRG chart at no. 47.

Springate approached Nicki French about recording a version of "Total Eclipse of the Heart". She turned down his offer as she regarded the Bonnie Tyler version a classic. He managed to get her onside and produced the early version of the song. It was later recorded by Stock and Aitken.

Daniel Amalm recorded his composition "Honey Dip" which became a minor hit in 1997, reaching no. 88 on the UK chart.

He produced "Let It Swing" / "Love in The 1st" for Sushi which was released on Branded BRAND 11 in 1998. The song made its debut at no. 23 on the RM Pop Chart on the week of October 17.

=== 2000s ===
With Gerry Shephard, he wrote the song "Don't Play That Song Again" which was Nicki French's entry for the Eurovision Song Contest 2000.

== Personal life ==
Springate married Lyn Barnes, a 25 year old bank secretary in 1976.. He later came out as gay in the early 1980s.
