= Glam rock =

Genre of rock music

- Other names: Glitter rock
- Stylistic origins: Rock and roll; bubblegum pop; art rock; hard rock; cabaret; pop; psychedelic rock; science-fiction
- Cultural origins: Early 1970s, United Kingdom
- Derivative forms: New Romantic; punk rock; gothic rock; synth-pop; post-punk; Britpop

Fusion genres
- Glam metal; glam punk

Other topics
- Make up; arena rock; scene (subculture); visual kei

Glam rock (also known as glitter rock) is a subgenre of rock music that developed in the United Kingdom in the early 1970s and was primarily defined by the hairstyles, makeup, and flamboyant clothing of its musicians, particularly platform shoes and glitter. Glam artists drew on diverse sources, ranging from bubblegum pop and 1950s rock and roll to cabaret, science fiction, and complex art rock. The flamboyant clothing and visual styles of performers were often camp or androgynous and have been described as playing with other gender roles.

The UK charts were inundated with glam rock acts from 1971 to 1975. The March 1971 appearance of T. Rex frontman Marc Bolan on the BBC's music show Top of the Pops—performing "Hot Love"—wearing glitter and satins, is often cited as the beginning of the movement. Other British glam rock artists included David Bowie, Mott the Hoople, Sweet, Slade, Mud, Roxy Music, Alvin Stardust, Wizzard and Gary Glitter. In the United States, the scene was much less prevalent, but US artists such as New York Dolls, Sparks, Suzi Quatro, Iggy Pop, Alice Cooper, Lou Reed and Jobriath achieved success in the UK and/or US. Glam rock declined after the mid-1970s, but influenced other musical genres including punk rock, post-punk, gothic rock and glam metal. The New Romantic movement, which began as an underground fashion subculture movement in nightclubs in the late 1970s before becoming mainstream in the early 1980s, was also inspired by the visuals of the glam rock era.

== Characteristics ==
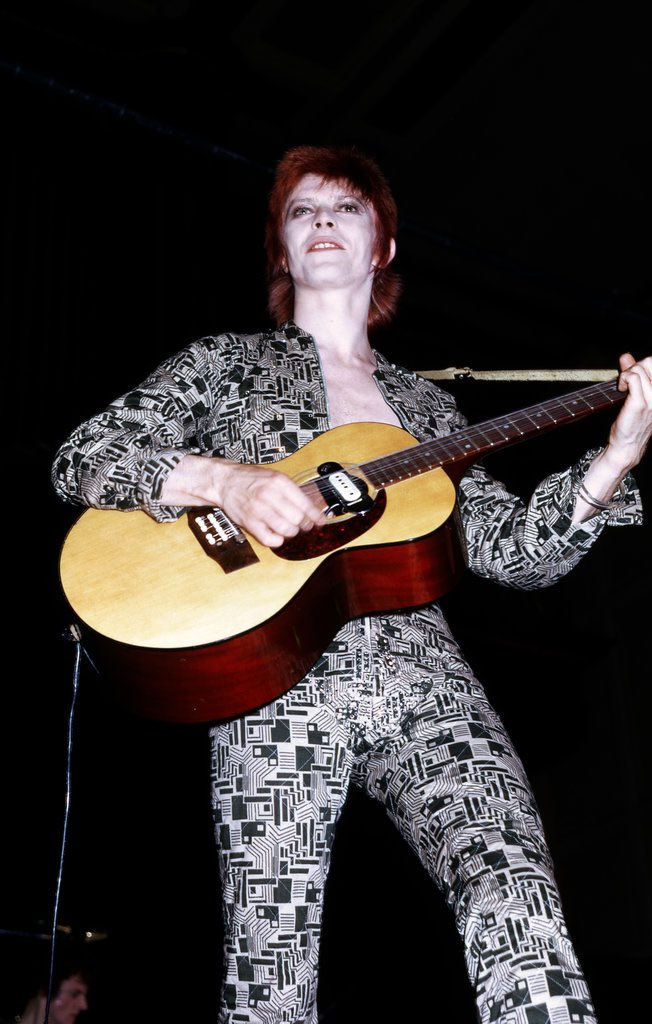
David Bowie as his alter-ego Ziggy Stardust during the 1972–73 Ziggy Stardust Tour

Glam rock can be seen as both a fashion and a musical subgenre. When it emerged in the 1970s, it was primarily defined by the flamboyant clothing, makeup, and hairstyles of its musicians, particularly platform shoes and glitter. Glam artists rejected the revolutionary rhetoric of the late 1960s rock scene, instead glorifying decadence, superficiality, and the simple structures of earlier pop music. In response to these characteristics, scholars such as I.Taylor and D. Wall characterised glam rock as "offensive, commercial, and cultural emasculation".

Artists drew on such musical influences as bubblegum pop, the brash guitar riffs of hard rock, stomping rhythms, and 1950s rock and roll, filtering them through the recording innovations of the late 1960s. Ultimately, it became very diverse, varying between the simple rock and roll revivalism of figures like Alvin Stardust to the complex art pop of Roxy Music. In its beginning, it was a youth-orientated reaction to the creeping dominance of progressive rock and concept albums – what Bomp! called the "overall denim dullness" of "a deadly boring, prematurely matured music scene".

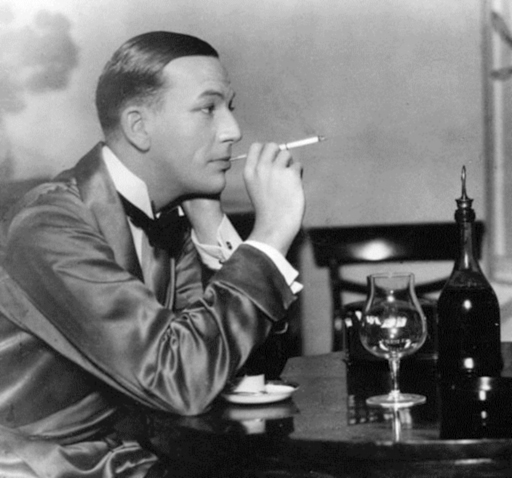
Glam rock artists like Bowie and Freddie Mercury were influenced by composer and actor Noël Coward (pictured in 1931).

Visually, it was a mesh of various styles, ranging from 1930s Hollywood glamour, through 1950s pin-up sex appeal, pre-war cabaret theatrics, Victorian literary and symbolist styles, science fiction, to ancient and occult mysticism and mythology; manifesting itself in outrageous clothes, makeup, hairstyles, and platform-soled boots. Glam rock is most noted for its sexual and gender ambiguity and representations of androgyny, besides extensive use of theatrics.

It was prefigured by the flamboyant English composer Noël Coward, for example his 1931 song "Mad Dogs and Englishmen", with music writer Daryl Easlea stating,

"Noël Coward's influence on people like Bowie, Roxy Music and Cockney Rebel was absolutely immense. It suggested style, artifice and surface were equally as important as depth and substance. Time magazine noted Coward's 'sense of personal style, a combination of cheek and chic, pose and poise'. It reads like a glam manifesto."

Showmanship and gender identity manipulation acts included the Cockettes and Alice Cooper, the latter of which combined glam with shock rock.

== History ==
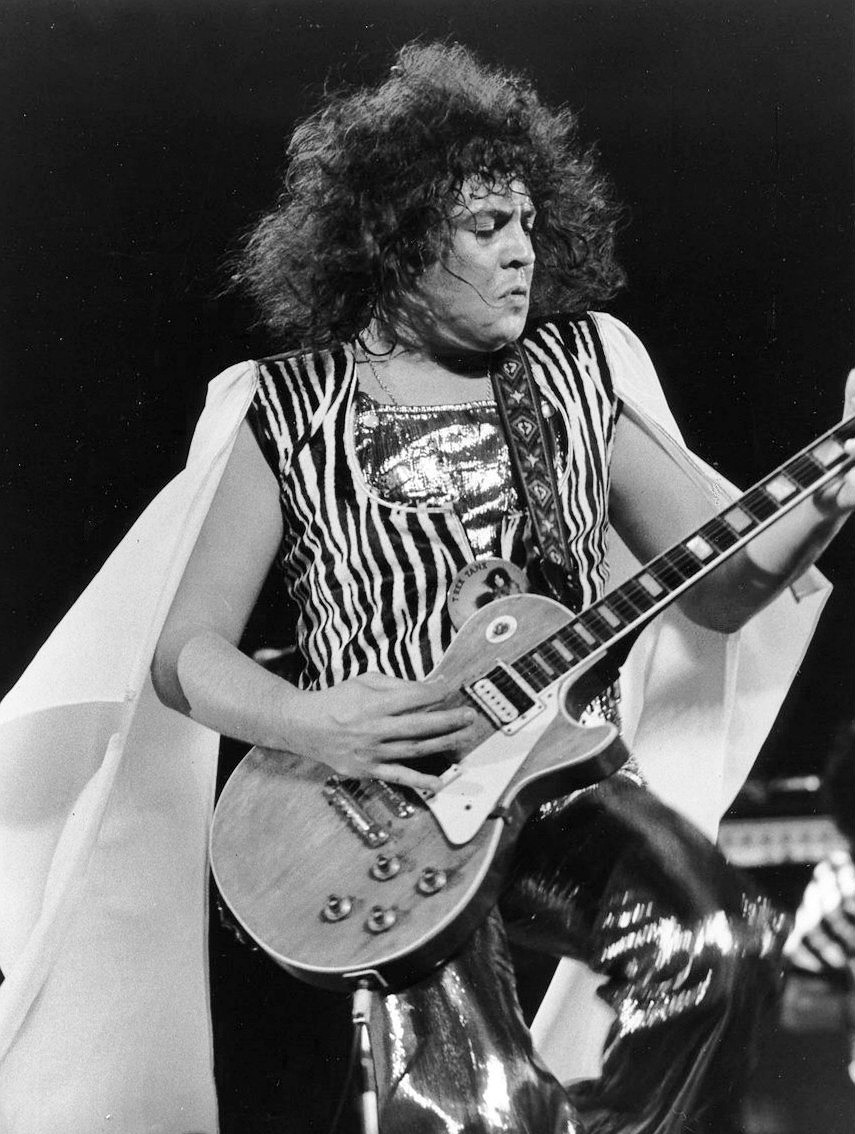
Marc Bolan of T. Rex performing on ABC's In Concert, 1973

Glam rock emerged from the English psychedelic and art rock scenes of the late 1960s and can be seen as both an extension of, and a reaction against, those trends. Its origins are associated with Marc Bolan, who had renamed his acoustic duo T. Rex and taken up electric instruments by the end of the 1960s. Bolan was, in the words of music critic Ken Barnes, "the man who started it all". Often cited as the moment of inception is Bolan's appearance on the BBC music show Top of the Pops in March 1971 wearing glitter and satins, to perform what would be his second UK Top 10 hit (and first UK Number 1 hit), "Hot Love". The Independent states that Bolan's appearance on Top of the Pops "permitted a generation of teeny-boppers to begin playing with the idea of androgyny".

Glitter rock was briefly the original name for the genre, but then "glam rock" overtook the previous term in popularity; "glitter rock" came to be associated with a more extreme version of glam rock. T. Rex's 1971 album Electric Warrior received critical acclaim as a pioneering glam rock album. In 1973, a few months after the release of the album Tanx, Bolan captured the front cover of Melody Maker magazine with the declaration "Glam rock is dead!"

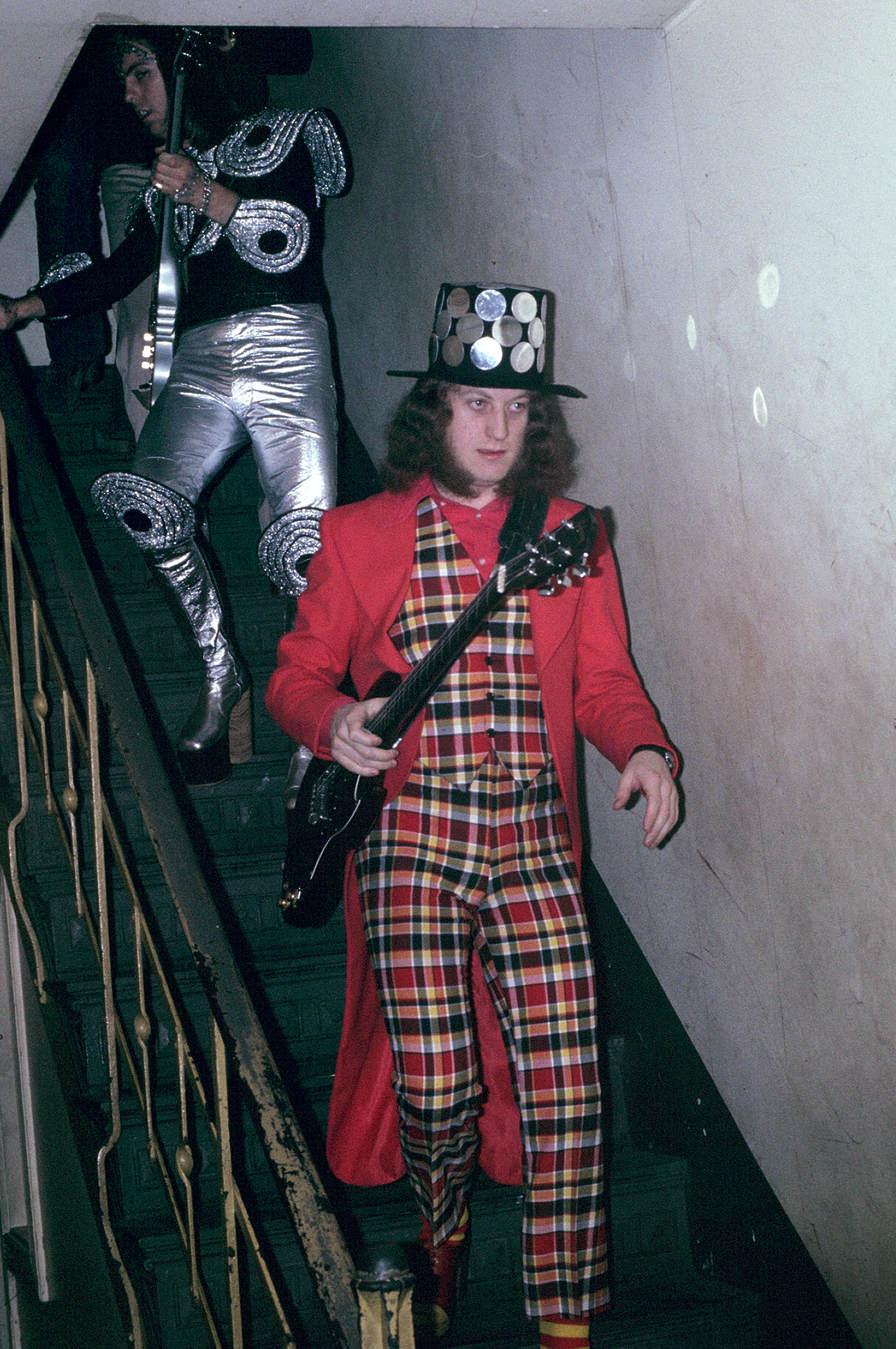
Noddy Holder (right) and Dave Hill (left) of Slade, near the height of their fame in 1973, showing some of the more extreme glam rock fashions

From late 1971, already a minor star, David Bowie developed his Ziggy Stardust persona, incorporating elements of professional makeup, mime and performance into his act. Bowie, in a 1972 interview in which he noted that other artists described as glam rock were doing different work, said "I think glam rock is a lovely way to categorize me and it's even nicer to be one of the leaders of it". Bolan and Bowie were soon followed in the style by acts including Roxy Music, Sweet, Slade, Mott the Hoople, Mud and Alvin Stardust. The popularity of glam rock in the UK was such that three glam rock bands had major UK Christmas hit singles; "Merry Xmas Everybody" by Slade, "I Wish It Could Be Christmas Everyday" by Wizzard and "Lonely This Christmas" by Mud, all of which have remained hugely popular. Glam was not only a highly successful trend in UK popular music, it became dominant in other aspects of British popular culture during the 1970s.

A heavier variant of glam rock, emphasising guitar riff centric songs, driving rhythms and live performance with audience participation, were represented by bands like Slade and Mott the Hoople, with later followers such as Def Leppard, Cheap Trick, Poison, Kiss, and Quiet Riot, some of which either covered Slade compositions (such as "Cum On Feel the Noize" and "Mama Weer All Crazee Now") or composed new songs based on Slade templates. While highly successful in the single charts in the UK (Slade for example had six number one singles), very few of these musicians were able to make a serious impact in the US; David Bowie was the major exception, becoming an international superstar and prompting the adoption of glam styles among acts like Lou Reed, Iggy Pop, New York Dolls and Jobriath, often known as "glitter rock" and with a darker lyrical content than their British counterparts.

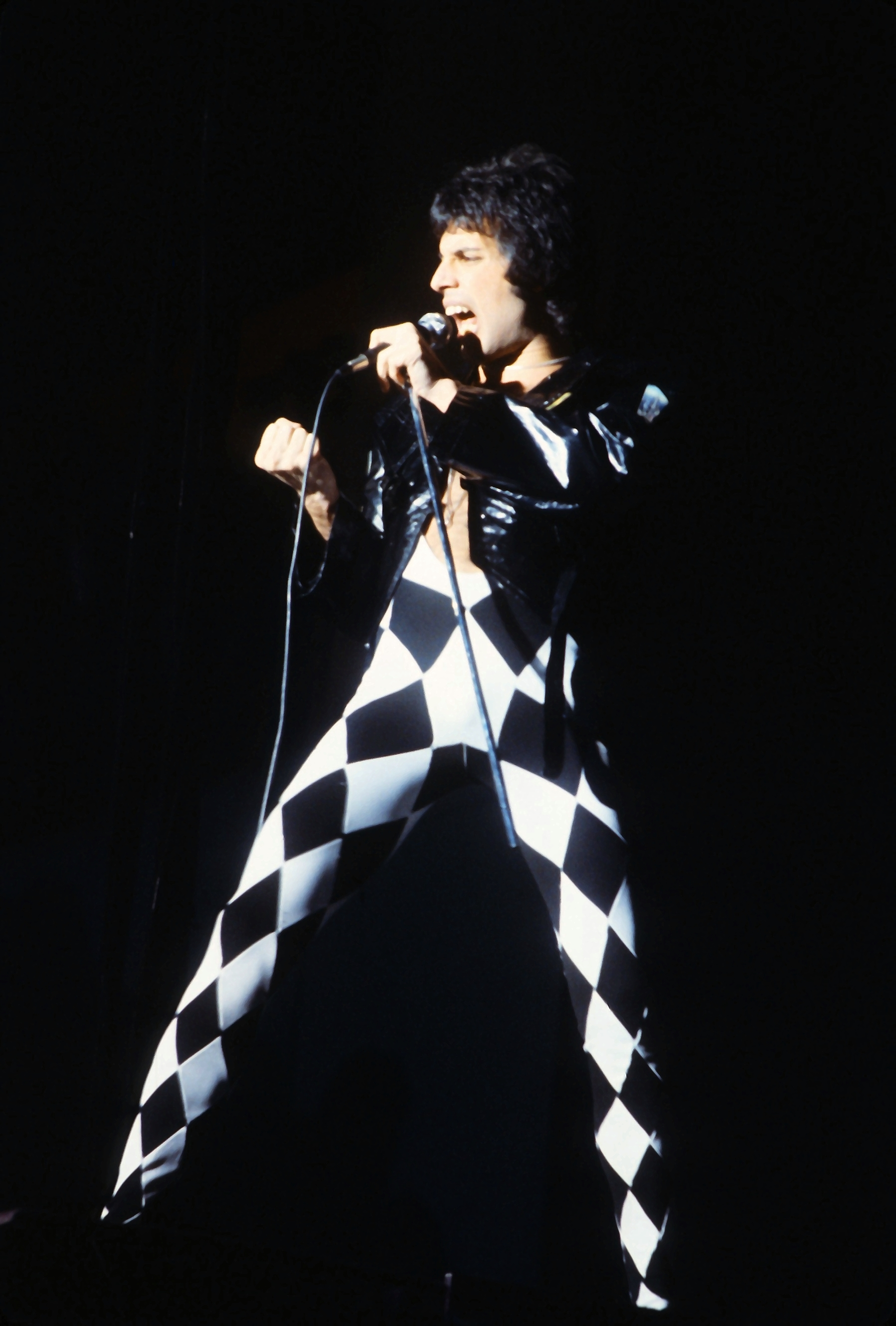
Freddie Mercury adopted glam rock aesthetics and collaborated with fashion designer Zandra Rhodes

In the UK, the term glitter rock was most often used to refer to the extreme version of glam pursued by Gary Glitter and the independent band with whom he often performed known as the Glitter Band. The Glitter Band and Gary Glitter had between them eighteen top ten singles in the UK between 1972 and 1975. A second wave of glam rock acts, including Suzi Quatro, Roy Wood's Wizzard and Sparks, had hits on the British single charts in 1973 and 1974. Quatro and T.Rex directly inspired the pioneering Los Angeles based all-girl group the Runaways. Existing acts, some not usually considered central to the genre, also adopted glam styles, including Rod Stewart, Elton John, Queen and, for a time, the Rolling Stones. After seeing Marc Bolan wearing Zandra Rhodes-designed outfits, Freddie Mercury enlisted Rhodes to design costumes for the next Queen tour in 1974. Punk rock, in part a reaction to the artifice of glam rock, but using some elements of the genre, including makeup and involving cover versions of glam rock records, helped end the fashion for glam from about 1976.

== Influence and legacy ==
While glam rock was exclusively a British cultural phenomenon, with Steven Wells in The Guardian writing "Americans only got glam second hand via the posh Bowie version", covers of British glam rock classics are now piped-muzak staples at US sporting events. Glam rock was a background influence for Richard O'Brien, writer of the 1973 London musical The Rocky Horror Show. Although glam rock went into a steep decline in popularity in the UK in the second half of the 1970s, it had a direct influence on acts that rose to prominence later, including Kiss and American glam metal acts like Quiet Riot, W.A.S.P., Twisted Sister, Bon Jovi, Mötley Crüe and Ratt.

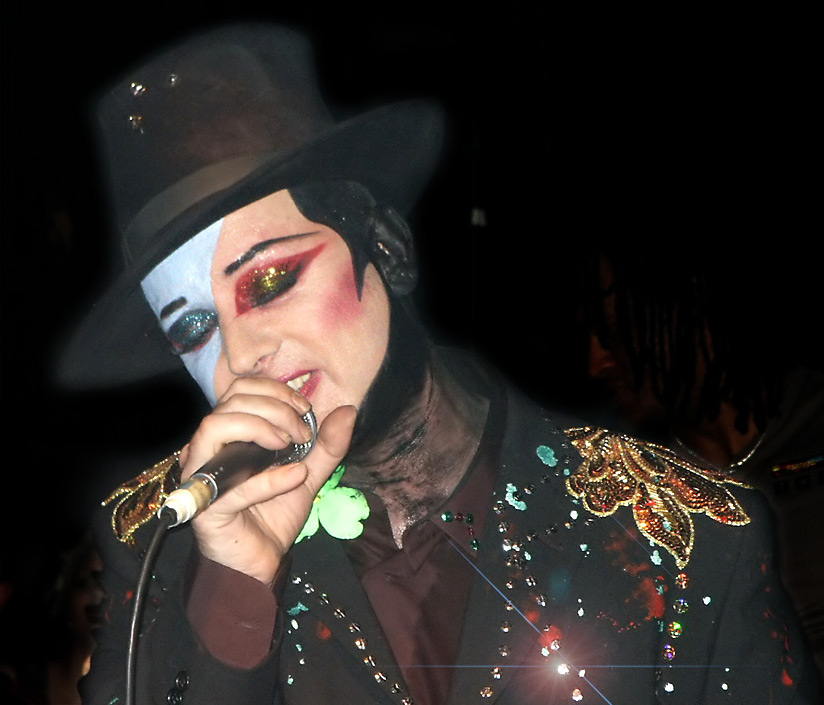
A figure in London's New Romantic movement, Boy George of Culture Club (performing in 2001) was influenced by glam rock icons Bolan and Bowie.

New Romantic acts in the UK such as Adam and the Ants and A Flock of Seagulls extended glam, and its androgyny and sexual politics were picked up by acts including Culture Club, Bronski Beat and Frankie Goes to Hollywood. Gothic rock, which includes Robert Smith of the Cure, was largely informed by the makeup, clothes, theatricality and sound of glam, and punk rock adopted some of the performance and persona-creating tendencies of glam, as well as the genre's emphasis on pop-art qualities and simple but powerful instrumentation.

Glam rock has been influential around the world. In Japan in the 1980s, visual kei was strongly influenced by glam rock aesthetics. Glam rock has since enjoyed continued influence and sporadic modest revivals in R&B crossover act Prince, bands such as Marilyn Manson, Suede, U2, Placebo, Chainsaw Kittens, Spacehog and the Darkness, and has inspired pop artists such as Lady Gaga.

Its self-conscious embrace of fame and ego continues to reverberate through pop music decades after the death of its prototypical superstar, Marc Bolan of T. Rex, in 1977. As an elastic concept rather than a fixed stratosphere of '70s personalities, it is even equipped to survive the loss of its most enduring artist, David Bowie.

— Judy Berman writing for Pitchfork in 2016, From Bowie to Gaga: How Glam Rock Lives On

== Relationship to the LGBT community ==
The glam rock scene that emerged in early 1970s London included numerous artists who identified as bisexual or later came out, including Queen's Freddie Mercury, Elton John, and David Bowie. Medium's Claudia Perry felt that "Glam rock was a queer paradise of sorts. Watching Mick Ronson and Bowie frolic onstage gave hope to every queer kid in the world. John's flamboyancy was also of great comfort. Marc Bolan of T. Rex is still the subject of speculation (a friend who worked at Creem remembers him coming on to just about everyone when he came through Detroit, but this clearly isn't definitive)." Glam rock also helped to normalise androgynous fashion. Jobriath, the rock scene's first openly gay star, was also part of the glam rock scene.

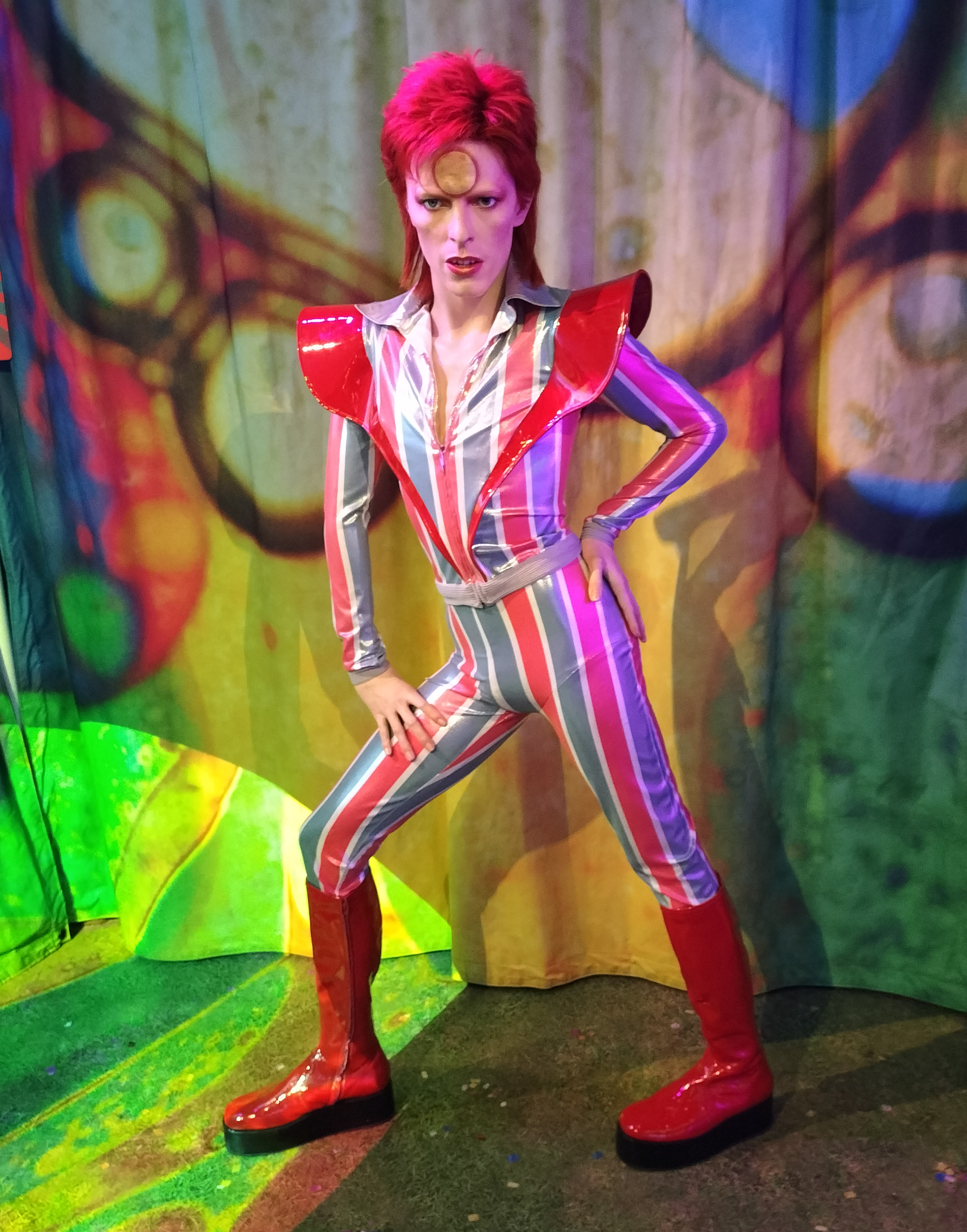
Wax figure of Bowie (in his Ziggy Stardust persona) at Madame Tussauds, London

Glam rock hits "Walk on the Wild Side" by Lou Reed and "Rebel Rebel" by Bowie also brought attention to non-heteronormative situations in the world of rock. When discussing "Rebel Rebel", Tim Bowers recalls that "glam's vocals had a fruity theatricality, supporting lyrics that presented as a boast: 'Your mother can't tell if you're a boy or a girl.' Glam was butch and femme at once: bisexuality in sound."

The Rocky Horror Show, soundtracked by primarily glam rock, was a keystone of LGBTQ media in the 1970s. A song from the show, "Sweet Transvestite", first performed by Tim Curry (as Dr. Frank-N-Furter) in the West End, was noted as "the first big, glam rock aria of the musical" and that glam rock "was a queering (or camping) of the genre of rock music" in the book Trans Representations in Contemporary, Popular Cinema. The musical Hedwig and the Angry Inch (1998) also used glam rock to tell the story of a gender-affirming surgery gone awry. In discussing why glam rock was used for Hedwig, the article goes on to say:

"By showcasing a more fluid approach to gender expression, glam rock artists like David Bowie, Marc Bolan, and Freddie Mercury became icons for the LGBTQ+ community. They helped pave the way for greater acceptance and understanding."

== Film ==
Movies that reflect glam rock aesthetics include:

- T. Rex's documentary Born to Boogie (1972)
- The Sweet's BBC documentary All That Glitters (1973)
- Brian De Palma's Phantom of the Paradise (1974)
- Gary Glitter's Remember Me This Way (1974)
- The Rocky Horror Picture Show (1975)
- Slade's Slade in Flame (1975)
- Never Too Young to Rock (1975)
- Bruce Beresford's Side by Side (1975)
- David Bowie's Ziggy Stardust and the Spiders from Mars: The Motion Picture (1979)
- Todd Haynes's Velvet Goldmine (1998)
- John Cameron Mitchell's Hedwig and the Angry Inch (2001)
- Kieran Turner's Jobriath A.D. (2012)

== See also ==
- List of glam rock artists
