= Who's Got the Last Laugh Now? =

Studio album by Scooter
- Released: 4 November 2005
- Recorded: 2005
- Length: 50:02
- Label: Sheffield Tunes
- Producers: H.P. Baxxter; Rick J. Jordan; Jay Frog; Jens Thele

Scooter chronology
Mind the Gap (2004)	Who's Got the Last Laugh Now? (2005)	Excess All Areas (2006)

Singles from Who's Got the Last Laugh Now?
- 1. "Hello! (Good to Be Back)" Released: 14 October 2005; 2. "Apache Rocks the Bottom!" Released: 30 December 2005

Who's Got the Last Laugh Now? is the eleventh studio album by Scooter. It was released on 4 November 2005 through Sheffield Tunes.

Two singles were released from the album: "Hello! (Good to Be Back)" and a remix of "Rock Bottom" and "Apache" entitled "Apache Rocks the Bottom!". The original "Rock Bottom" was also released as a single solely in the Netherlands. It was the last studio album featuring Jay Frog, who had been with the band since late 2002, until the release of Open Your Mind and Your Trousers in 2024 as he rejoined in 2022.

== Track listing ==
1. "Lights Out" – 1:46
2. "Hello! (Good to Be Back)" – 3:34
3. "Privileged to Witness" – 4:33
4. "Rock Bottom" – 3:29
5. "The Leading Horse" – 3:26
6. "Take Me, Baby" – 4:15
7. "Apache" – 2:58
8. "See Me, Feel Me" – 4:09
9. "Unity Without Words, Pt.3" – 6:02
10. "Everlasting Love" – 4:22
11. "Seven Bridges" – 4:56
12. "Mesmerized" – 6:42

Notes

- "Lights Out" samples "Sirius" by The Alan Parsons Project.
- "Hello! (Good to be Back)" samples both "Hello, Hello, I'm Back Again" by Gary Glitter from the 1973 album Touch Me and "3 a.m. Eternal (Live at the S.S.L)" by The KLF from the 1991 album The White Room.
- "Privileged to Witness" samples "Walking on the Moon" by The Police from the 1979 album Reggatta de Blanc as well as "The Morning After (Thrillseekers Remix)" by 8 Wonders.
- "Rock Bottom" samples the 2002 song "Explode" by Jordan & Baker and "Alles naar de klote" by Euromasters.
- "The Leading Horse" samples "The Four Horsemen" by Aphrodite's Child from the 1972 album 666.
- "Take Me Baby" samples "Take Me Baby" by Jimi Tenor from the 1994 album Sähkömies and the song "Underpass" by John Foxx. In 2021 Jay Frog released the track called "Take Me Baby", which is his own house version of the original song with the vocals distorted in similar way as H.P. Baxxter's signature ones.
- "Apache" samples the 1960 song "Apache" by The Shadows as well as 2004 song "Tonka" by Jesselyn. In 2007 the Organ Donors' remix of Jesselyn's "Tonka" appeared on the compilation "Pharmacy Vol.5: Our Law" mixed DJ Hellraiser and Organ Donors - the remix samples the "Apache" theme as well and is very similar musically to the "Apache" by Scooter. In 2013 on the web released "20 Years of Hardcore" version of the album "Apache" was accidentally replaced with "Apache Rocks the Bottom (Flip 'n Fill Remix)". Later Kontor Records offered free digital downloads of the track, for those who bought the album on CD or from online music stores.
- "See Me, Feel Me" samples "Automatic Lover" by Dee D. Jackson from the 1978 album Cosmic Curves. On the "20 Years of Hardcore" re-release, it released as an instrumental version due an error related to the remastering process. Later Kontor Records offered free digital downloads of the corrected version, for those who bought the album on CD or from online music stores.
- "Everlasting Love" samples the 1967 song "Everlasting Love" by Robert Knight.
- "Seven Bridges" samples "Über sieben Brücken mußt du gehn" by Karat.

=== 20 Years of Hardcore bonus content ===
1. "Hello! (Good to be Back)" (Club Mix)
2. "Path"
3. "Apache Rocks the Bottom!" (Radio Edit)
4. "Apache Rocks the Bottom!" (Club Mix)
5. "Apache Rocks the Bottom!" (Alex K Remix)
6. "Countdown"
7. "Apache Rocks the Bottom!" (United DJs Remix)
8. "Apache Rocks the Bottom!" (Clubstar Remix)
9. "Apache Rocks the Bottom!" (Flip & Fill Remix)

=== Limited edition bonus content ===
1. "Hello (Good to be Back)" Handy Video
2. "One (Always Hardcore)" Handy Video
3. "Maria (I Like It Loud)" Handy Video
4. Calendar for 2006

=== 7" Mini LP ===
There was also released a Promo Mini LP on 7" white vinyl with the snippets of 1:30 length (not from beginning) of each track. This 7" vinyl was a ticket to the record release party of the album and was sent to special guests and friends. Only 100 copies of 7" vinyl were released.

== Tour ==
The Who’s Got the Last Laugh Now? Tour was heavily promoted as stickers of tour dates were on the albums and singles from the album.

It took place in 2006 at selected locations, this was the first tour to include the mash up of Fuck the Millennium and Call Me Mañana.

=== Locations ===
1. Hanover, Germany (6 March 2006)
2. Berlin, Germany (7 March 2006)
3. Munich, Germany (8 March 2006)
4. Leipzig, Germany (10 March 2006)
5. Zwickau, Germany (11 March 2006)
6. Dresden, Germany (12 March 2006)
7. Vienna, Austria (14 March 2006)
8. Mannheim, Germany (16 March 2006)
9. Karlsruhe, Germany (17 March 2006)
10. Zurich, Switzerland (18 March 2006)
11. Filderstadt, Germany (20 March 2006)
12. Cologne, Germany (21 March 2006)
13. Dortmund, Germany (22 March 2006)
14. Emden, Germany (24 March 2006)
15. Bremen, Germany (25 March 2006)
16. Hamburg, Germany (26 March 2006)

=== Tracklist ===
1. Intro (Lights Out)
2. Hello! (Good to Be Back!)
3. I'm Raving
4. Apache Rocks the Bottom
5. The Leading Horse
6. Shake That!
7. Panties Wanted
8. Weekend!
9. Fuck the Millennium/Call Me Mañana
10. Stripped
11. Trance Atlantic
12. Maria (I Like It Loud)
13. Aiii Shot the DJ
14. Am Fenster / The Chaser / Jigga Jigga!
15. Faster Harder Scooter
16. Nessaja
17. One (Always Hardcore)
18. Fire
19. How Much Is the Fish?

== Charts ==
Chart performance for Who's Got the Last Laugh Now?
Chart (2005–2006)	Peak position
Austrian Albums (Ö3 Austria)	31
German Albums (Offizielle Top 100)	14
Norwegian Albums (VG-lista)	30
Swiss Albums (Schweizer Hitparade)	44
