= Mind the gap =

Warning to train passengers boarding and disembarking

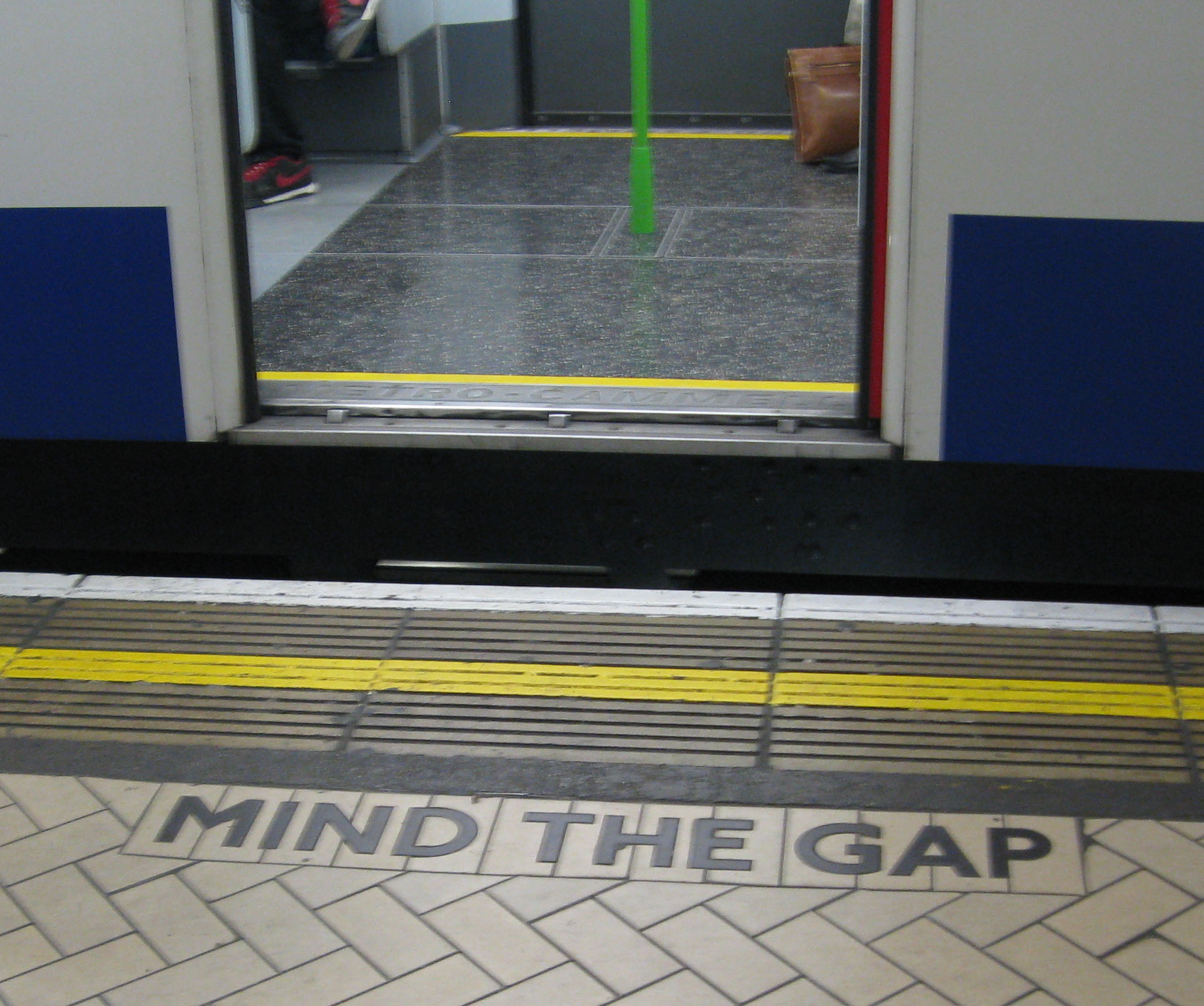
"Mind the gap" shaped tiling on the District line platform at Victoria station

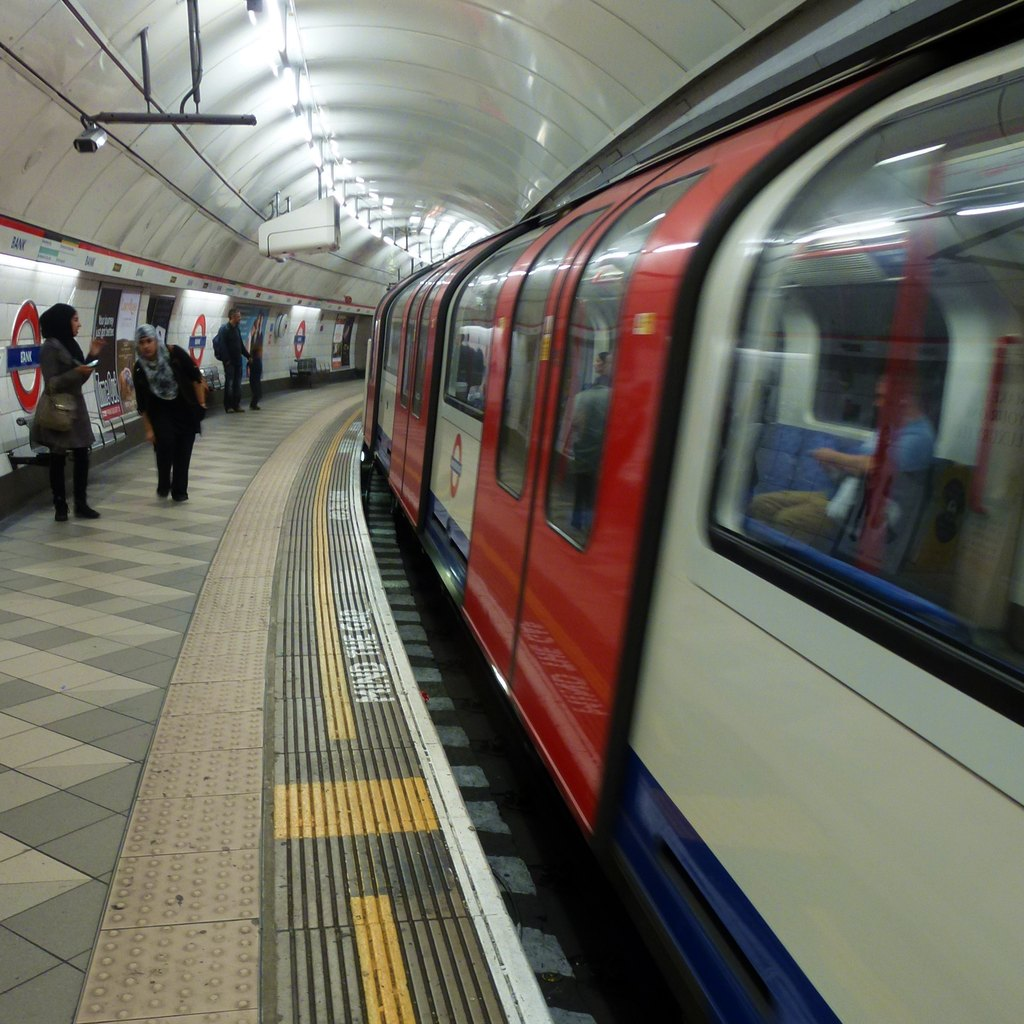
The Central line platform at Bank station with a 1-foot (30 cm) gap between the train and the platform edge

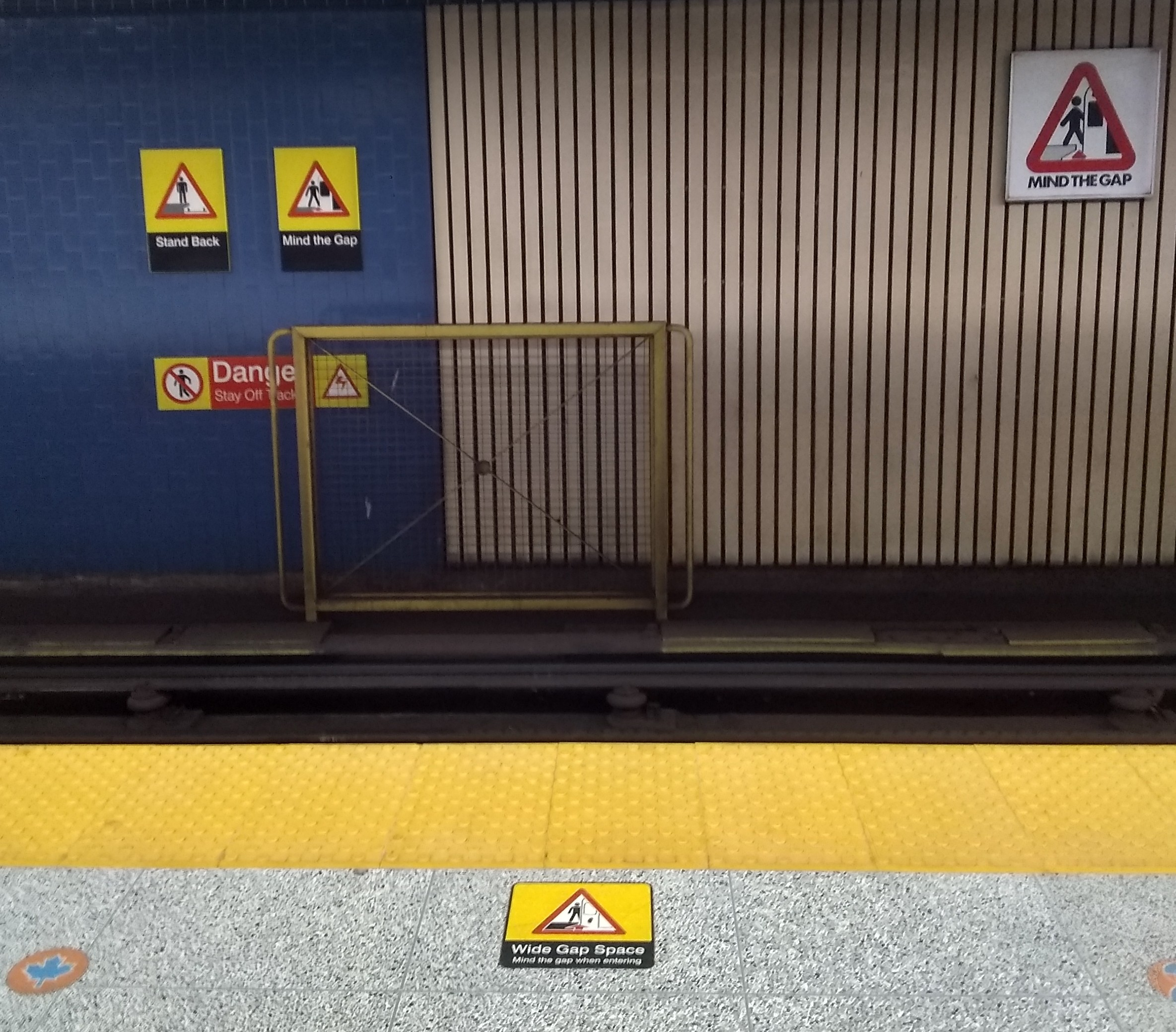
A variety of "mind the gap" signage found on the Toronto subway, including wall signs and a foot-level reminder on the platform

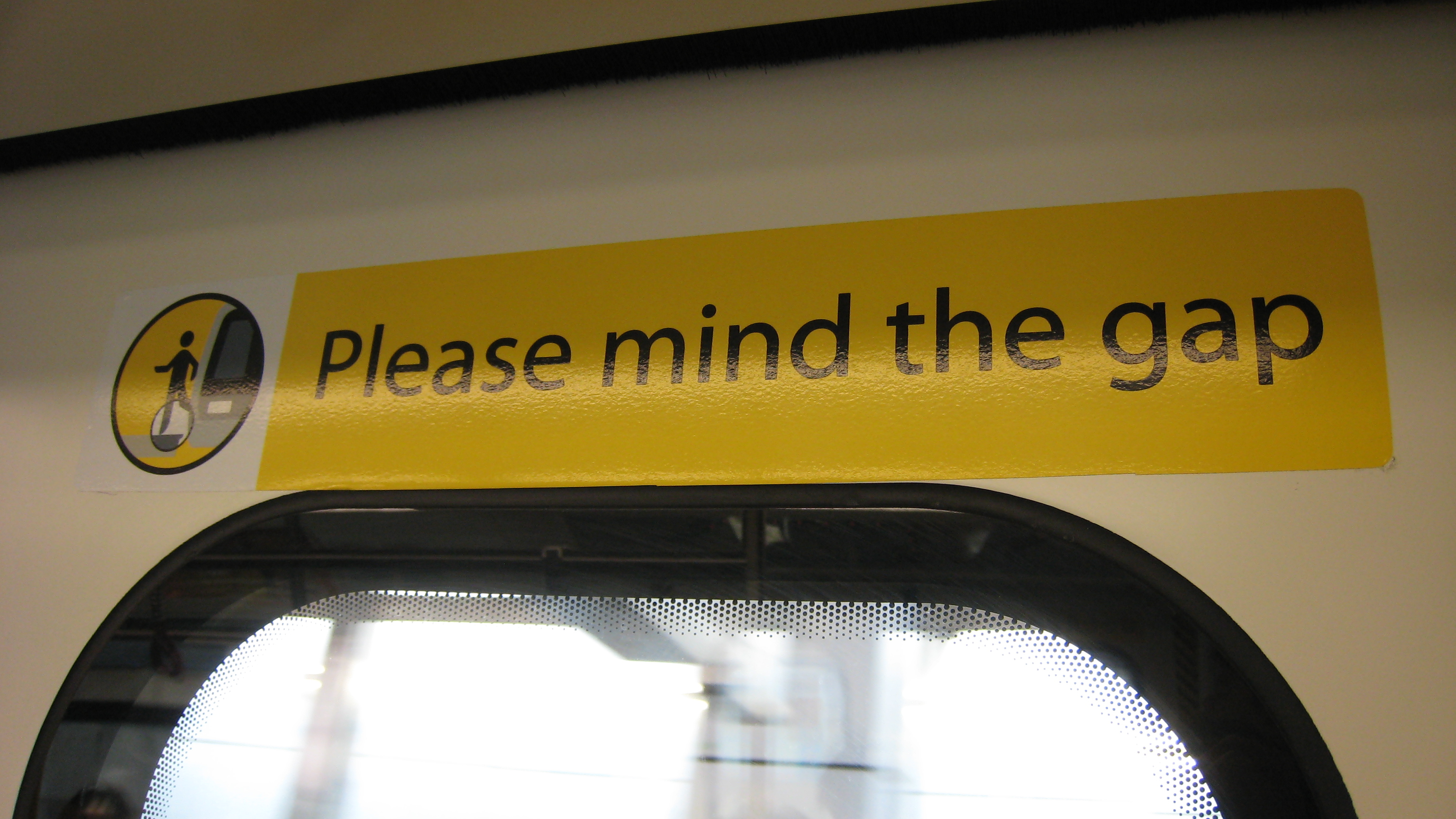
A former "Please mind the gap" sign on a Hong Kong MTR train

"Mind the gap" or sometimes "watch the gap" is an audible and written warning phrase issued to rail passengers to take caution while crossing the horizontal, and in some cases vertical, spatial gap between the train doorway and the station platform edge.

The phrase was first introduced in 1968 on the London Underground in the United Kingdom. It is popularly associated with the UK among tourists because of the particularly British word choice (this meaning of the verb mind has largely fallen into disuse in American English, where the term "watch your step" is more commonly used).

== Origin of the phrase ==
The phrase "Mind the gap" was coined in around 1968 for a planned automated announcement, after it had become impractical for drivers and station attendants to warn passengers. London Underground chose digital recording using solid state equipment with no moving parts. As data storage capacity was expensive, the phrase had to be short. A concise warning was also easier to paint onto the platform.

The equipment was supplied by AEG Telefunken. According to the Independent on Sunday, sound engineer Peter Lodge, who owned Redan Recorders in Bayswater, working with a Scottish Telefunken engineer, recorded an actor reading "Mind the gap" and "Stand clear of the doors please", but the actor insisted on royalties and the phrases had to be re-recorded. Lodge read the phrases to line up the recording equipment for level, and those were used.

While Lodge's recording is still in use, some lines use other recordings. From 2005, the voice of Phil Sayer was heard on the Jubilee, Northern, and Piccadilly lines. When he died in 2016, The New York Times, one of many newspapers worldwide to report his death, said, "Mr. Sayer's was not the only voice cautioning passengers to 'mind the gap', but it is arguably the most familiar one." For 15 years before that, the voice on the Piccadilly line was that of Archers actor Tim Bentinck, but is now Julie Berry's. Another announcement was recorded by voice artist Emma Clarke. At least ten stations were supplied with announcers manufactured by PA Communications Ltd. of Milton Keynes. The recorded voice is that of Keith Wilson, their industrial sales manager (May 1990). It can still be heard at Paddington for example. Keith Wilson's voice can be heard in the background of a scene in the Bond film Skyfall.

In March 2013, an old "Mind the gap" recording by Oswald Laurence was restored to the curved northbound platform at Embankment station on the Northern line's Charing Cross branch so that the actor's widow, Margaret McCollum, could hear his voice.

== Use in Britain ==
=== London Underground ===
Because some platforms on the London Underground are curved, and the rolling stock that use them are straight, an unsafe gap is created when a train stops at a curved platform. In the absence of a device to fill the gap, some form of visual and auditory warning is needed to advise passengers of the risk of being caught unaware and sustaining injury by stepping into the gap. The phrase "Mind the gap" was chosen for this purpose and can be found painted along the edges of curved platforms and heard on recorded announcements when a train arrives at many Underground stations.

The recording is also used where platforms are non-standard height. Deep-level tube trains have a floor height around 20 cm (8 inches) less than sub-surface stock trains. Where trains share platforms, for example, some Piccadilly line (deep-tube) and District line (sub-surface) stations, the platform is a compromise. On London's Metropolitan line, a gap has been created between the train and the platform edge at Aldgate and Baker Street stations. This is due to the phasing out of the old "A" stock trains and their replacement with "S" stock trains, which have low floors to ease accessibility for disabled people.

"Mind the gap" audible warnings are always played on the Central line platforms at Bank, the Northern line northbound platform at Embankment, and the Bakerloo line platforms at Piccadilly Circus. The markings on the platform edge usually line up with the doors on the cars.

While the message is sometimes played over the platform's public address system on some lines, usually it is an arrival message inside the train itself: "Please mind the gap between the train and the platform".

During the coronation weekend of King Charles III in 2023, the message was voiced by the King himself and his wife Camilla. The King says, "My wife and I wish you and your families a wonderful coronation weekend," followed by Camilla, who says, "Wherever you are travelling, we hope you have a safe and pleasant journey," which is ended with the King saying "And remember, please mind the gap." It was played throughout every railway station in the United Kingdom.

== Use in Ireland ==
The phrase "mind the gap" can be heard at each station along Dublin's DART and at all stations in the city centre. The message can be seen in some railway stations in the rest of Ireland. On Commuter and InterCity trains, the phrase "Please mind the gap" is accompanied by the Irish "Seachain an bhearna le bhur dtoil" when pulling into stations.

== The phrase worldwide ==
=== In trains ===
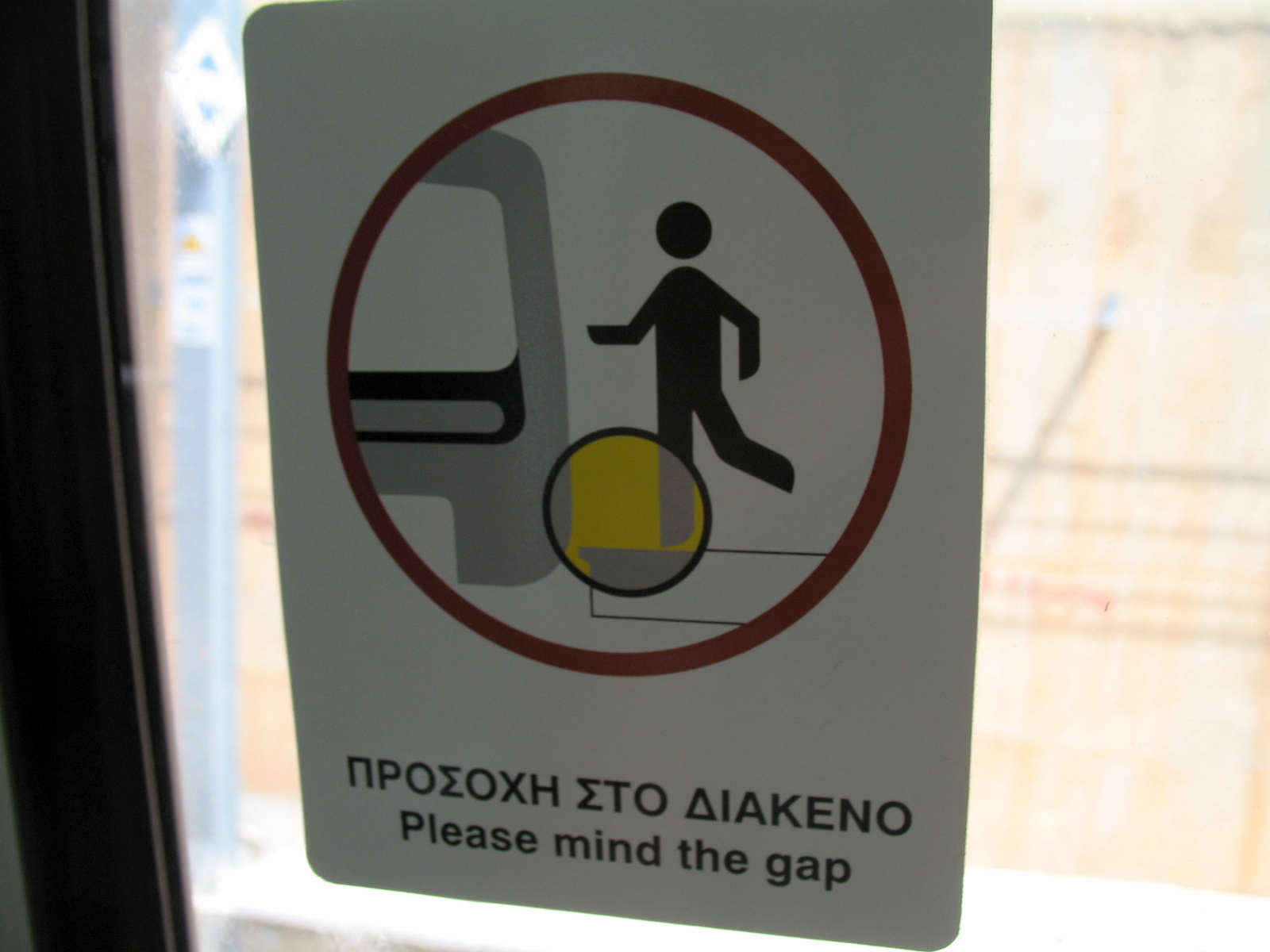
"Mind the gap" sticker in an Athens Metro train, in both Greek and English

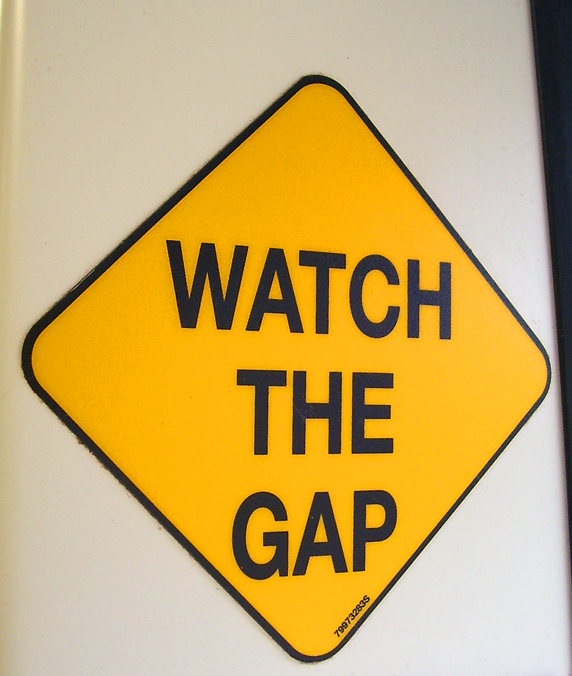
"Watch the gap" variant used on Metro-North in New York

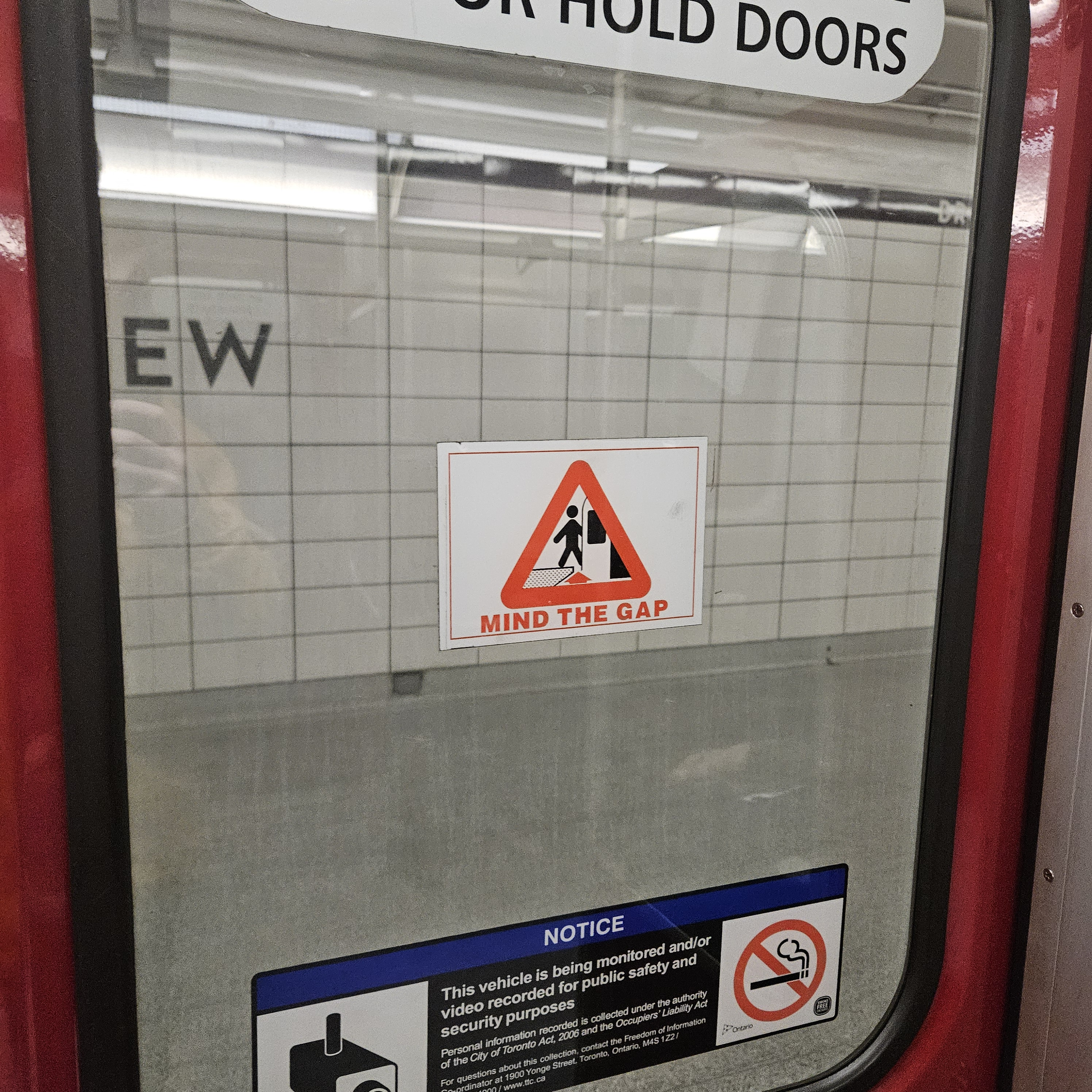
Mind the gap signage is common on the doors of Toronto subway trains.

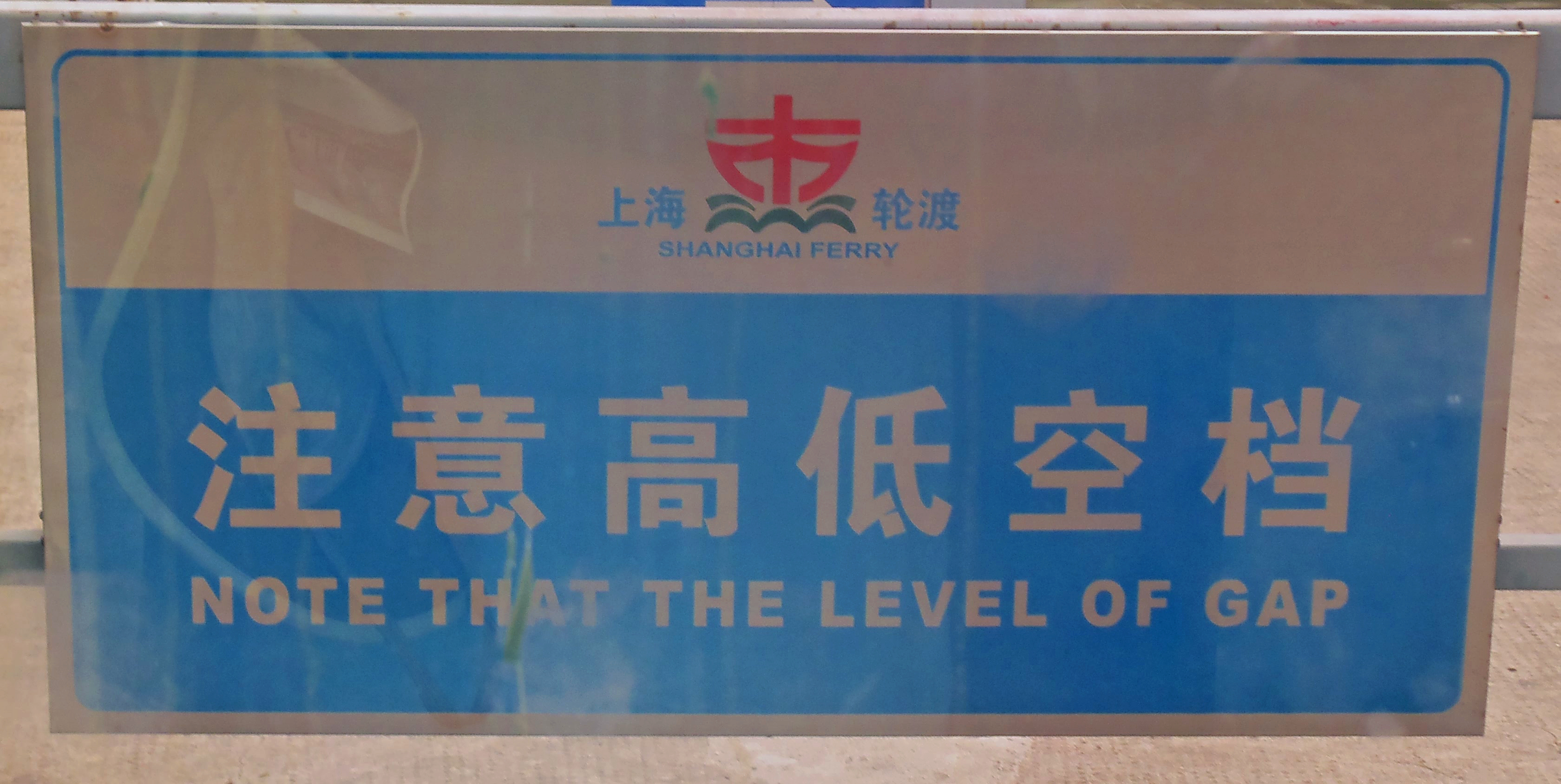
Chinglish translation of "Mind the gap" becomes "Note that the level of gap" on a ferry dock in Shanghai.

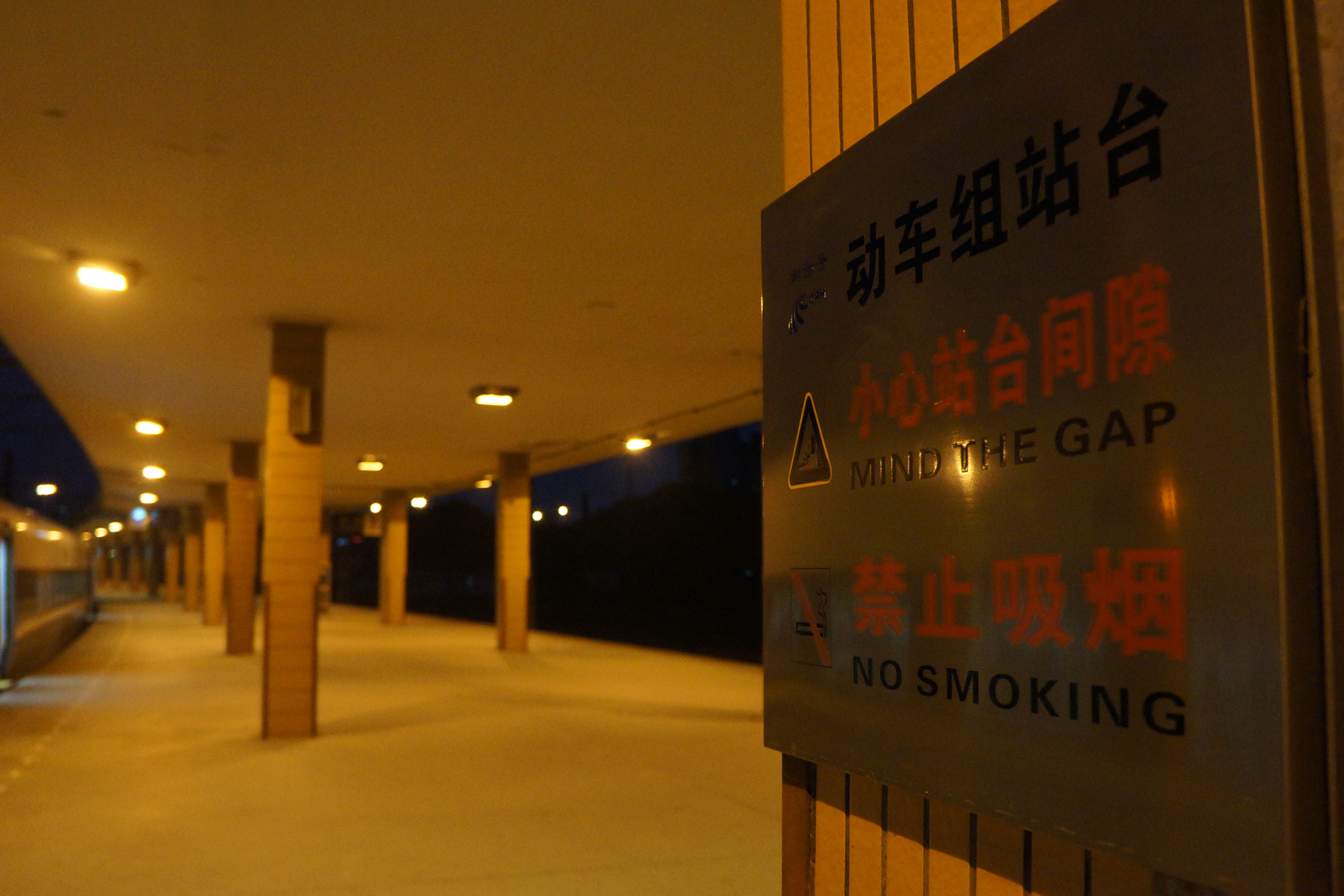
"Mind the gap" and "No smoking" notice at Hangzhou railway station

Equivalents of "Mind the gap" are used by transit systems worldwide, particularly when stations curve, but most new systems tend to avoid these types of stations.

==== Europe ====
- The French version "Attention à la marche en descendant du train" ("Watch your step when getting off the train"), an Alexandrin, can be heard on trains arriving at curved stations on Metro lines 1 to 7, 9, 11, 13, 14 and RER A, B, E. Announcements are also played in English ("Please mind the gap between the train and the platform") and in either Italian, German, Japanese, Spanish, or Korean. Written signage can be seen when walking up to said platforms. Another version used by SNCF is "Prenez garde à l'intervalle entre le marchepied et le quai" ("Be careful with the gap between the footboard and the platform.") on national rail services.
- In the Athens Metro, the message "Παρακαλούμε προσοχή στο κενό μεταξύ συρμού και αποβάθρας" ("Please mind the gap between the train and the platform") is heard in both Greek and English at the stations of Monastiraki and Agios Nikolaos.
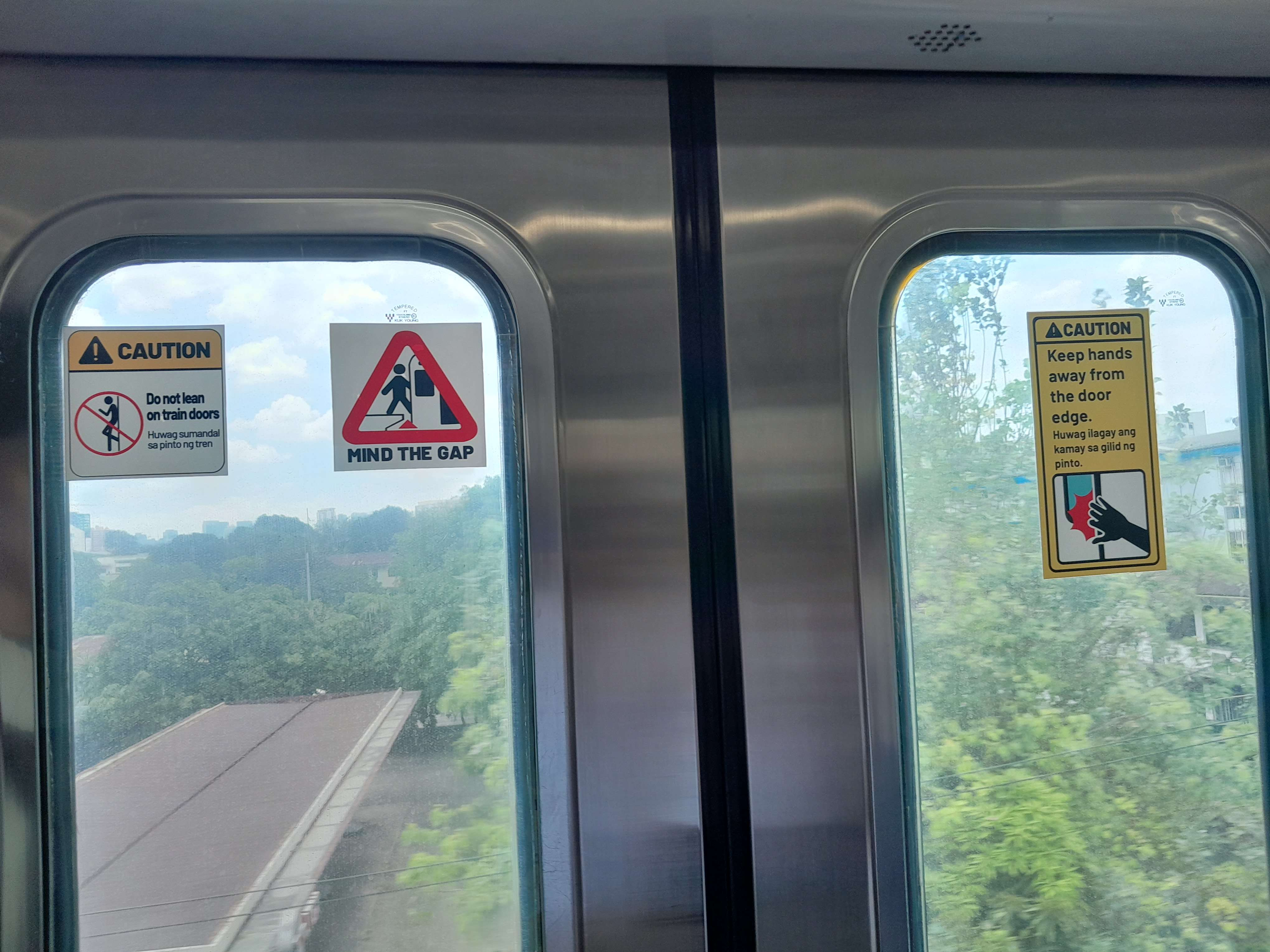
- "Mind the gap" sticker used on a Manila LRTA Line 2 2000 Class EMU
  In Stockholm Metro's and on Stockholm commuter rail's stations two versions can be heard: "Tänk på avståndet mellan vagn och plattform när Du stiger av", meaning "Mind the distance between carriage and platform when you exit". It is also displayed as text on electronic displays.
- In Oslo, T-bane trains play a recorded Norwegian warning: "Vær oppmerksom på avstand mellom tog og platform" (Be aware of the distance between train and platform.) -- followed up by the English "Please mind the gap."
- In Helsinki, on some commuter rail stations, "Mind the gap" can be heard in English, Finnish, and Swedish.
- In Hamburg, passengers at the S-Bahn station Berliner Tor are warned with yellow flashing lights and the announcement "Bitte beachten Sie die Lücke zwischen Zug und Bahnsteigkante!" ("Please mind the gap between train and platform").
- On the Berlin U-Bahn, the phrase "Bitte beachten Sie beim Aussteigen die Lücke zwischen Zug und Bahnsteigkante" ("Please mind the gap between train and platform edge when alighting") is used, followed by the English "Please mind the gap between platform and train."
- On the Madrid Metro, a recorded warning message can be heard inside the trains when approaching a station with curved platforms: "Atención: estación en curva. Al salir, tengan cuidado para no introducir el pie entre coche y andén." ("Caution: station on a curve. As you exit, be careful not to place your foot between the train and the platform.") No warning messages are heard when arriving at a station with straight platforms.
- On the Lisbon Metro at the Marquês de Pombal station on the blue line, the announcement "Atenção ao intervalo entre o cais e o comboio" ("Pay attention to the gap between the platform and the train") can be heard.
- On all of the trains of the Milan Metro network, a yellow sticker on every door is visible with the warning in the Italian language "Attenzione allo spazio tra treno e banchina" (meaning literally "Pay attention to the gap between the train and the platform") and also in English "Mind the gap between the train and the platform".
- On the Amsterdam Metro, a female voice announces the phrase "Let bij het in- en uitstappen op de ruimte tussen metro en perron." ("Pay attention to the space between the metro and platform during boarding and disembarking.") when approaching some stations, which is then followed in English by: "Please mind the gap between the train and platform."
- Trains of the Dutch Railways have an announcement that warns passengers to carefully disembark because of high-level difference: "Beste reizigers, let goed op bij het uitstappen. Er is een niveauverschil tussen het perron en de trein." ("Dear passengers, pay attention when disembarking. There is a level difference between the platform and the train.") This is only announced in Dutch.
- In Warsaw Metro, a sticker over the doors depicting a stick figure falling into the gap with texts below: "Uważaj na odstęp!" in Polish and (in italics) "Mind the gap" in (British) English, both written in Frutiger font (the same as all assets forming Warsaw Public Transport).

==== Asia ====
- On Jakarta's Commuterline (KRL), the train announcement "Perhatikan jarak antara peron dengan kereta." is spoken. This translates as "Please mind the gap between the train and the platform." An English announcement is then played: "Please mind the platform gap."
- On Singapore's MRT, the phrases "Please mind the platform gap" and "Please mind the gap" are used in announcements in English, played in the trains whenever a train approaches an underground station after the station's name has been announced twice. It is also played on underground station platforms on the North-South and East-West lines just after the train doors open or, sometimes, just as the train approaches the platform. Trains also have stickers pasted on the windows to caution passengers. The Chinese version "请小心空隙" is also commonly heard. It is also heard in trains on the North East and Downtown lines in English, Chinese, Malay, and Tamil.
- The phrase can be heard in New Delhi Metro in two languages (English and Hindi): "कृपया दूरी का ध्यान रखें" "Mind the gap".
- It also can be heard in Chennai Metro in two languages (English and Tamil): "அன்புகூர்ந்து இடைவெளியை கவனத்தில் கொள்ளவும்" "Please Mind the gap".
- On Hong Kong's MTR, the phrase "Please mind the gap" (請小心月台空隙) is announced in three languages: Cantonese, Mandarin, and English. In recent years, a more elaborate version of the announcement, heard on some East Rail line stations with very curved platforms, says, "Please mind the gap and be aware of the difference in levels between the platform and the train" (請小心空隙及留意月台與車廂地面嘅高低).
- Several mainland Chinese metro systems use the phrase extensively; on the Tianjin Metro, announcements and stickers on train doors and platforms mention the gap (as well as to "mind the gap") in both English and Chinese. (The Chinese phrase is 小心站台空隙.) The Beijing Subway uses "Mind the Gaps" (note the plural). On lines operated by Beijing MTR Corp., Ltd., the Hong Kong/British influence is prominent, with the English announcement "Please mind the gap between the train and the platform" – having a British pronunciation – being played every time a train arrives. Both the Shanghai Metro and the Nanjing Metro use versions with slightly mutilated grammar ("Caution, Gap" and "Care the Gap", respectively, although the Chinese is the same).
- Metro Manila MRT-3's automated train arrival announcement in mixed English and Filipino
  In December 2025, MRTC 3000 class trains of the Manila Metro Rail Transit System Line 3 (MRT-3) began using pre-recorded messages for station identification in alternating English and Filipino, with "mind the gap" incorporated in the announcement albeit not translated. Preceded by a chime sound, the message is: "Arriving at (station name). Paparating na: (station name). Doors will be opening on the left/right. Ang pinto [ay] magbubukas sa kaliwa/kanan. Please mind the gap. The train is currently northbound/southbound." Before automation, the announcement is done by train drivers and security personnel, with the Filipino version of "Mind the gap" being "Mag-ingat po sa paghakbang sa pagitan ng tren at station platform." (Please watch your step between the train and the station platform.)
- When approaching Taipei Main Station and Guandu Station on the Red line of Taipei Metro, after the transfer information is announced, the phrase "Mind the gap" (下車時請注意間隙) is announced in Mandarin, English, Hokkien and Hakka.
- On many trains in Japan, the message "電車とホームの間が広く空いておりますので、ご注意下さい" is spoken. This translates as: "There is a wide space between the train and the platform, so please be careful". The phrase "足元にお気をつけ下さい" is also common, which means "Please mind your step".
- Bangkok underground train announcement in Thai and English
  In Thailand, the announcement is used somewhat differently from the London one. On Bangkok underground trains and Airport Rail Link trains, it says, "Please mind the gap between train and platform". Some grammarians argue that as specific and countable nouns, the words "train" and "platform" should be preceded by "the". Also, the Thai language version of the announcement does not refer to a "gap" but translates to "Please be careful when stepping out of the train", and is announced at every station as "โปรดใช้ความระมัดระวังขณะก้าวออกจากรถ" (romanised: bpròht chái kwaam rá mát rá wang kà-nà gâao òk jàak rót). However, in the Bangkok skytrain stations, the Thai announcement mentions the "gap", and is announced quite infrequently as: "ผู้โดยสารโปรดทราบ ในขณะที่เข้าและออกจากรถไฟ โปรดคำนึงถึงช่องว่างระหว่างชานชาลาและรถไฟ ขอบคุณคะ" (romanised: pôo doi săan bpròht sâap, nai kà-nà têe kâo láe òk jàak rót fai, bpròht kam neung tĕung chông wâang rá-wàang chaan chaa-laa láe rót fai. kòp kun ká) and can be translated into: "Attention, passengers, while entering and exiting the train, please mind the gap between the platform and the train. Thank you."
- Signs on ferry docks in Shanghai render the phrase in Chinglish as "Note that the level of gap".
- Announcements are made on Seoul Metro trains when arriving at stations with a curved platform, e.g. Myeongdong station on Line 4 and Singil station on Line 1, saying "이 역은 타는 곳과 전동차 사이가 넓습니다. 내리실 때 조심하시기 바랍니다" (which translates as "There is a big gap between the station platform and the train, please be careful when getting off") and "Please watch your step" in Korean and English.
- The phrase is used in Dhaka Metro's pre-recorded audio announcement in a female voice after stopping at the stations in both Bangla and English. In English, the phrase goes, "Please mind the gap". In Bangla, however, the audio announcement does not explicitly mention or announce the gap; therefore, the phrase goes as "দয়া করে নিরাপদ দূরত্ব বজায় রাখুন" (romanised: Doẏa kōre nirapod durōttō bojaẏ rakhun) meaning "Please maintain a safe distance".

==== Oceania ====
- At most Sydney Trains stations and on Waratah series train carriages, there is an automated announcement reminding passengers to mind the gap ("Please mind the gap when getting on or off the train") as well as posters informing riders about the number of people who fall down the gap each year.
- Adelaide Metro trains conclude automated station announcements with the reminder, "Please mind the gap".
- Many Queensland Rail trains announce "mind the gap" after the station name on arrival at a station.
- On Transperth trains arriving at Perth, Mount Lawley, Sherwood and Stirling the announcement "Please mind the gap" is used.

==== Americas ====
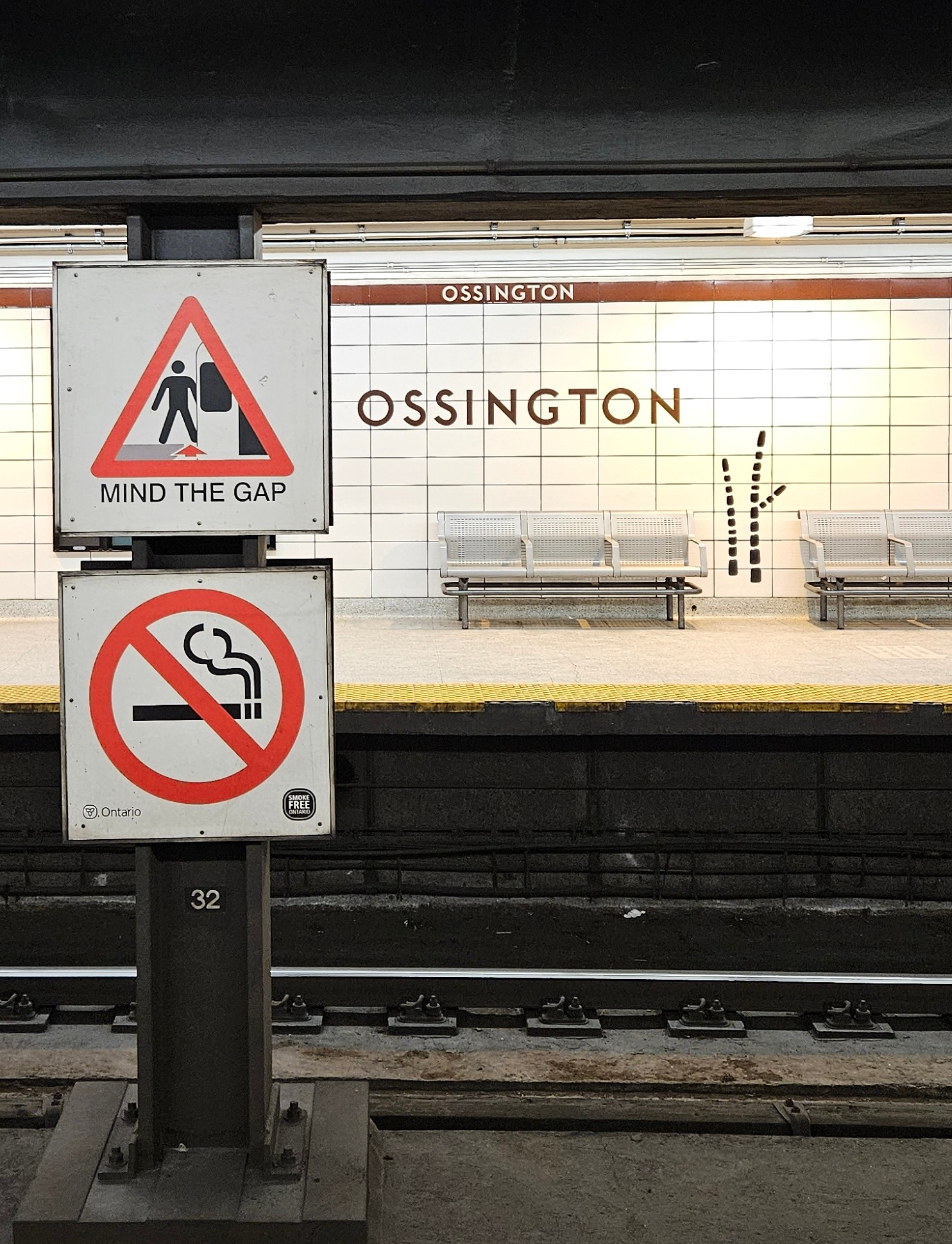
Signage throughout Toronto's subway system reminds users to Mind the Gap.

- In early 2009 the phrase was also being used on Metro Transit (King County) buses in and around Seattle, Washington.
- At the stations of the São Paulo Metro and CPTM in São Paulo, Brazil, the sentence that can be heard is "Cuidado com o vão entre o trem e a plataforma" ("Watch the gap between the train and the platform").
- At almost all stations of SuperVia, Rio de Janeiro suburban trains, the driver announces "Observe o espaço entre o trem e a plataforma" ("Watch the space between the train and the platform"), and sometimes "Observe o desnível entre o trem e a plataforma" ("Watch the level difference between the train and the platform").
- On the Rio de Janeiro Metro, the phrase "Observe atentamente o espaço entre o trem e a plataforma – Mind the gap" also can be heard.
- During the CPTM train trips in São Paulo, the announcer says, before reaching a station, "Ao desembarcar, cuidado com o vão entre o trem e a plataforma – Before leaving, mind the gap between the train and the platform".

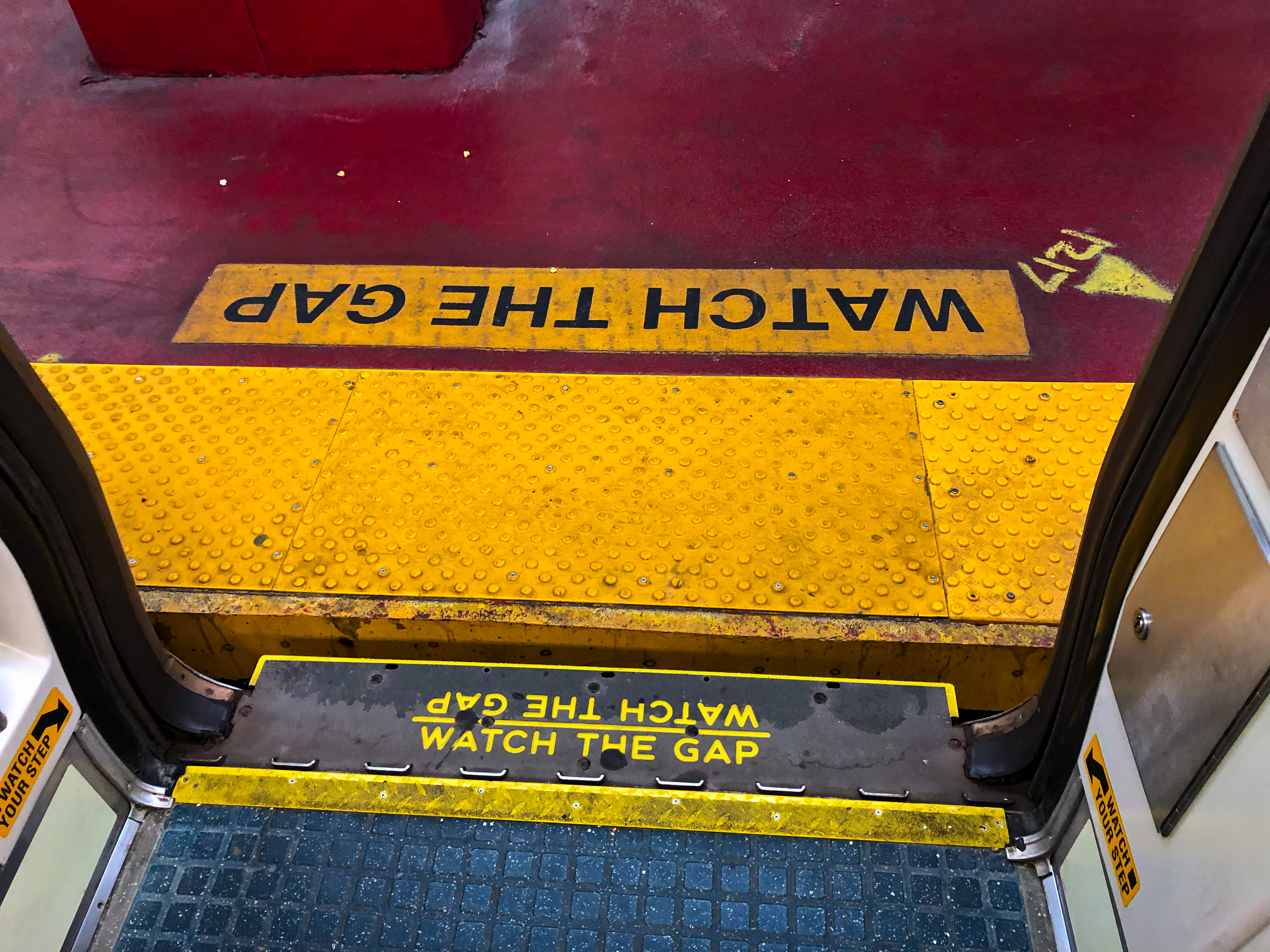
"Watch the gap" warning on an LIRR M7 Train and platform, at Penn Station

- The New York City–area Long Island Rail Road, Metro-North, and New Jersey Transit use signs that read "Watch the gap" on trains and platforms. Because of reports of people falling through the gap, a warning is now played at every station, plus automated announcements on board the trains of all three railroads.
  - The Metropolitan Transportation Authority (MTA), which operates LIRR and MNRR, retained New York personalities, including Maria Bartiromo and Al Roker, to recite the slogan. The newer trains with automated announcements also announce, "As you leave the train, please watch/step over the gap between the train and platform", to warn passengers to use caution.
  - It is also used on the MTA-operated New York City Subway and the Staten Island Railway – on trains and platforms and in conductor announcements. Newer trains equipped with automated announcements would say, "As you exit, please be careful of the gap between the platform and the train", where applicable after a station announcement is made.
  - New Jersey Transit uses signs on doors on all trains that read "Caution: Watch the gap" and an announcement plays "When leaving the train, please watch the gap" where applicable to warn passengers to remain cautious of the gap.
- Plaques on Toronto subway station platforms warn riders to "Mind the gap." Platform-edge decals warn passengers, 'Wide gap space, mind the gap when entering.' Similar warnings are affixed to the inside of carriage doors. These warnings are featured alongside a ubiquitous graphic depicting a passenger boarding a carriage. Announcements about the warning on the public announcement system in each station can also be heard intermittently.
- In the United States, the standard Amtrak conductor announcement when approaching any station stop concludes with "Mind the gap between the train and the platform". This is not strictly adhered to, and the more common American phraseology 'Watch the gap' may be heard instead.
- On the Buenos Aires Metro, warnings on platform floors and on the door windows in the trains read "Cuidado con el espacio entre el tren y el andén." ("Mind the gap between train and platform").
- The MBTA in Boston has added "Mind the gap" warnings near the platform edges in the 2016 renovated Government Center Station.

=== Other uses ===
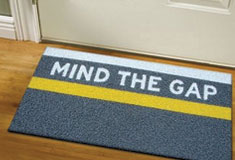
"Mind the gap" doormat

Despite its origin as a utilitarian safety warning, "Mind the gap" has become a stock phrase and is used in many other contexts having little to do with subway safety.

It has been used as the title of at least two music albums by Scooter and Tristan Psionic, a film, and a novel, as the name of a movie production company, a theatre company, and a board game. It was also the title of a regional daytime quiz show on ITV, hosted by Paul Ross.

The phrase is used in many video games, including Portal, Call of Duty: Modern Warfare 3, Halo, Where's My Water, Temple Run, Quantum Conundrum, Killing Floor, Amazing Alex, Armadillo Run and BioShock Infinite, and in animated series such as The Clone Wars, usually in an ironic context. A soldier in Captain America: The First Avenger says it humorously before they descend via zip-line onto a moving train across snowy mountain peaks. It was a prominent utterance by the subterranean cannibal killer of the 1972 movie Death Line. The phrase is also featured in the soundtrack of the game Timesplitters: Future Perfect in the Subway level.

It is also the title of a Noisettes song on their album What's the Time Mr. Wolf?. The phrase is used in the songs "Deadwing" by Porcupine Tree, "Bingo" by Madness, "Someone in London" by Godsmack, Metal Airplanes by Matthew Good and "New Frontier" by the Counting Crows. Emma Clarke, one of the voices of the London Underground, has released a Mind The Gap single. It features spoof London Underground announcements. The name of the Portuguese hip hop group Mind Da Gap was also inspired by this stock phrase.

The phrase was used as the name for a campaign in December 2010 to lobby the UK Government to allow Gap Year students to defer their university place and not pay the higher tuition fees in September 2012.

The phrase has been used to name a combinatorial optimization problem.

The original Oswald Laurence "Mind the gap" announcement and the current voice-over announcements are also used in electronic music.

== See also ==
- Objects in mirror are closer than they appear – Safety warning on convex mirrors, another safety warning that has become a cultural reference
- Platform gap – Space between a train car and the edge of the station platform
- Platform gap filler – Space between a train car and the edge of the station platform
- Platform screen doors – Doors separating rail platforms from tracks
- Walt Disney World Monorail System – Transit system in Florida, United States
- Stand clear of the closing doors, please. a similar safety warning on the New York City Subway that has also become a cultural reference.
