= Shake That (disambiguation) =

"Shake That" is a 2005 song by Eminem featuring Nate Dogg.

"Shake That" may also refer to:

- "Shake That!", a song by Scooter, 2004
- "Shake That" (Samantha Jade song), 2015
- "Shake That!!", a song by Band-Maid from New Beginning, 2015
