= Hello! (Good to Be Back) =

Single by Scooter

from the album Who's Got the Last Laugh Now?
- B-side: "Path"
- Released: 14 October 2005
- Recorded: 2005
- Length: 3:35
- Label: Sheffield Tunes
- Songwriters: Gary Glitter; Mike Leander; H. P. Baxxter; Rick J. Jordan; Jay Frog; Jens Thele
- Producers: Rick J. Jordan; Jay Frog; H. P. Baxxter

Scooter singles chronology
"Suavemente" (2005)	"Hello! (Good to Be Back)" (2005)	"Apache Rocks the Bottom!" (2005)

"Hello! (Good to be Back)" is a song by German band Scooter. The song samples the refrain from Gary Glitter's 1973 single "Hello, Hello, I'm Back Again". It was released in October 2005 as the lead single from the album Who's Got the Last Laugh Now?.

== Music video ==
The video for the song was shot in Chicago, Illinois, during the group's first tour of the United States.

== Track listing ==
CD single and download

1. "Hello (Good to be Back)" (Radio Edit) – 3:35
2. "Hello (Good to be Back)" (Club Mix) – 7:43
3. "Hello (Good to be Back)" (Extended) – 5:52
4. "Path" – 3:36

12"

1. "Hello (Good to be Back)" (Extended) – 5:52
2. "Hello (Good to be Back)" (Club Mix) – 7:43

== Samples ==
"Hello! (Good to be Back)" samples four songs. The main sample being from "Hello, Hello, I'm Back Again" by Gary Glitter from the 1973 album Touch Me. Additional samples are from "3 a.m. Eternal (Live At The S.S.L)" by The KLF from the 1991 album The White Room and "We Call It Acieed" by D Mob and Dark Night Rider by Ice MC.

== Chart performance ==
Chart (2005–2006)	Peak position
Austria (Ö3 Austria Top 40)	23
Belgium (Ultratop 50 Flanders)	48
European Hot 100 Singles (Billboard)	46
Finland (Suomen virallinen lista)	3
Germany (GfK)	14
Hungary (Single Top 40)	2
Netherlands (Single Top 100)	43
Switzerland (Schweizer Hitparade)	36
