= Platform gap =

Space between a train car and the edge of the station platform

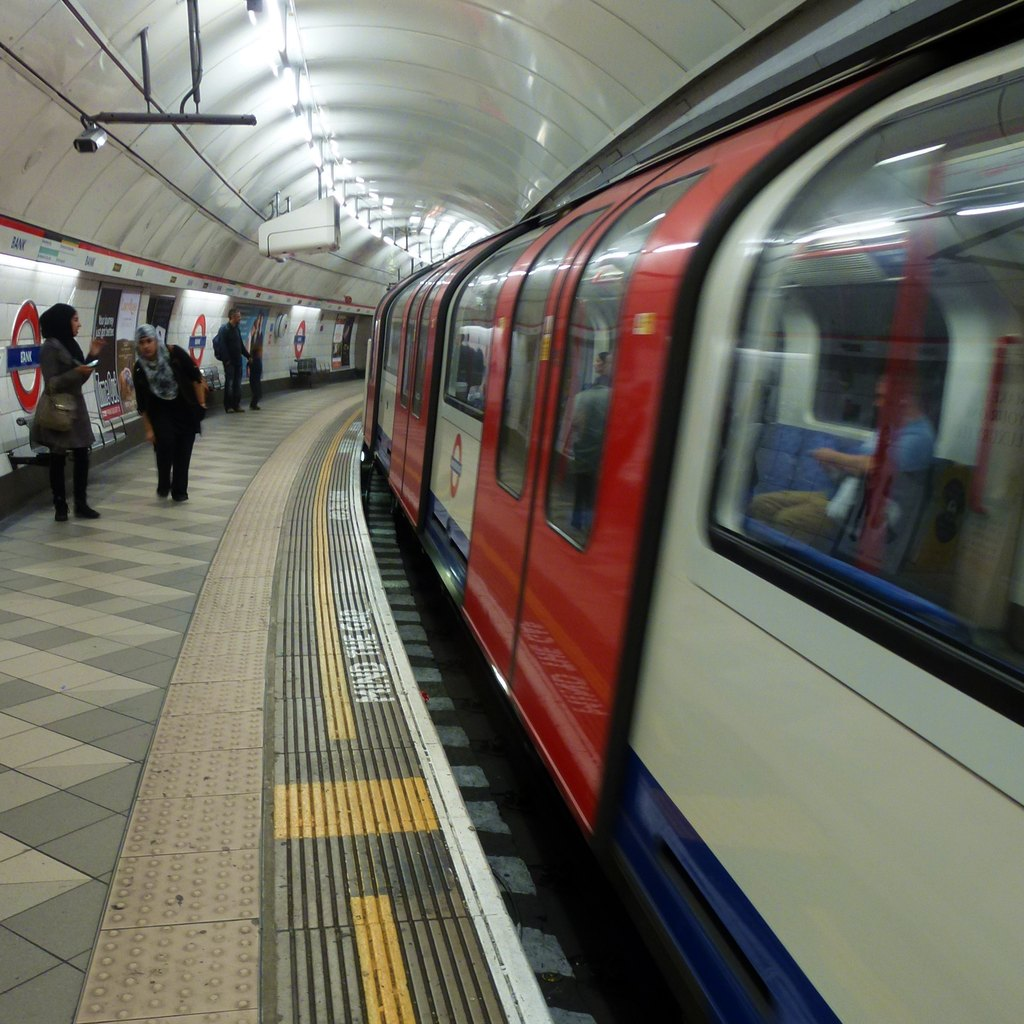
A Central line platform at Bank tube station, London, showing the 1-foot (30 cm) gap between the train and the platform edge (delineated by a solid white line). "Mind the gap" is printed on the ground to warn passengers.

A platform gap (also known technically as the platform train interface or PTI in some countries) is the space between a train car (or other mass transit vehicle) and the edge of the station platform, often created by geometric constraints, historic legacies, or use of partially compatible equipment.

Many high-quality bus rapid transit (BRT) systems also use high platforms at station stops to allow fast and efficient level boarding and alighting, but potentially leaving hazardous gaps between the platforms and the buses. Alignment setups such as Kassel curbs help to reduce platform gaps without requiring time-consuming manual alignment at each BRT station stop.

== Definition and measurement ==
A platform gap has two component measurements:

- vertical (difference between the platform height and train floor height)
- horizontal (distance from the platform edge to the train step)

== Straight platforms ==
The ideal platform would be straight and align perfectly with a train or other large vehicle. Even in this case, a small gap between the conveyances and the platform is necessary to allow the vehicles to move freely without rubbing against the platform edge. In 2007, the Long Island Rail Road regarded an 8-inch (20 cm) platform gap as typical on its non-curved platforms.

== Curved platforms ==
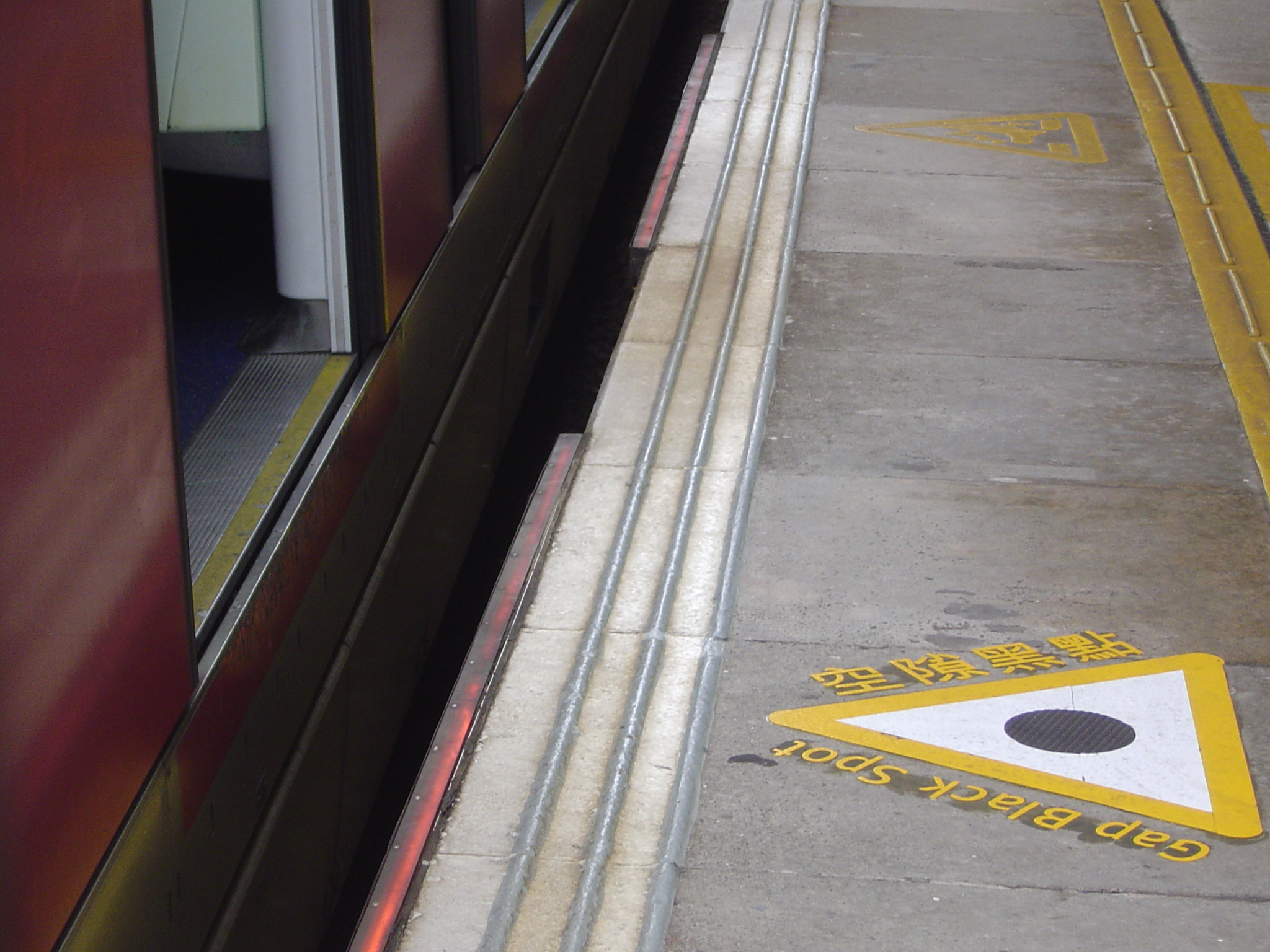
Significant vertical and horizontal platform gap at University station on the MTR system in Hong Kong

In real-world situations, stations are often constrained by limited space, legacy designs, and track geometry or roadway layout. Stations may have to use a compromise design, with a platform curved in a way that will allow a vehicle or train to arrive and depart without mechanical interference, but which leaves unavoidable horizontal and possibly vertical gaps between the cars and the platform edge. These spaces are caused by the geometric gap between a curve (circular arc or otherwise) and the straight-line chord or tangent formed by a railcar or bus in proximity to a platform. These types of gaps are geometrically intrinsic, and cannot be eliminated as long as the platform is located on a curved or banked segment of track or guideway.

When passenger car doors are located only at the ends of each car (a common design for commuter rail and long-distance trains), platform access from a concave platform is preferred, since this brings the car ends in closest proximity to the platform edge. By contrast, a convex platform would leave the largest possible gaps between the car ends and the platform edge, making this design undesirable and thus rarely implemented. The opposite is true for those cases where car doors are located at the center of each car.

An example of platforms designed for access from the concave side is at Lansdowne station in Boston, where side platforms for both the inbound and outbound directions are located to reduce platform gaps to commuter rail trains of the Framingham/Worcester Line. Concave and convex gaps also exist in several MTR stations in Hong Kong, particularly on the East Rail line, which was built on the historic Kowloon–Canton Railway line.

== Gap fillers ==
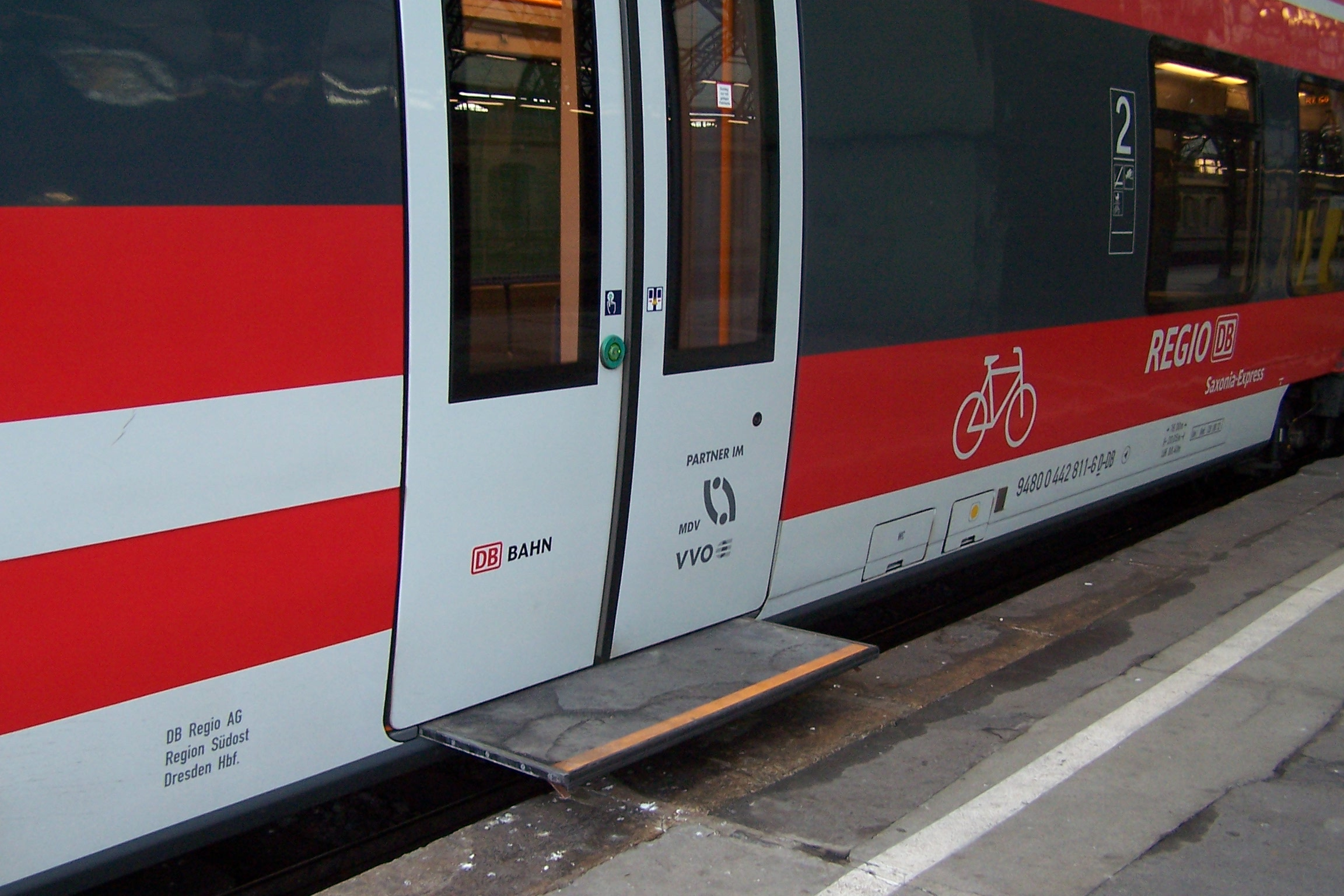
This German regional train (DB class 442) has door-mounted gap fillers

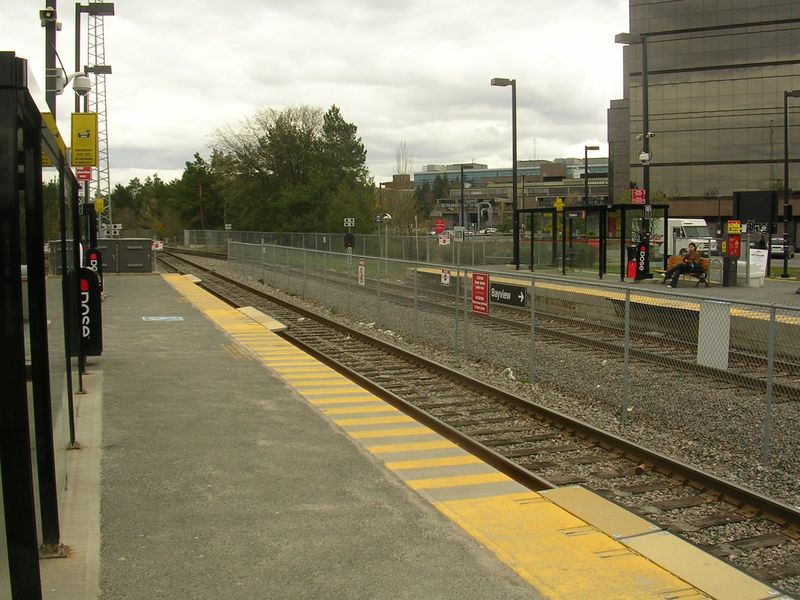
Carleton station on O-Train Line 2 (Ottawa, Canada). Note gap fillers at solid yellow markings.

Mechanical platform edge extensions known as platform gap fillers may be used to bridge the gap between platform and vehicle. These stopgaps require careful alignment of the vehicle upon arrival, and careful synchronization to avoid serious damage caused by departure of the vehicle before the extenders are fully retracted. They increase station dwell time, and introduce safety and maintenance concerns of their own.

Alternatively, the gap fillers may be mounted on the train, and linked to the door operating mechanism. They may be found on modern trainsets, like various versions of the Stadler GTW and the British Rail Class 555 for the Tyne and Wear Metro. Train-mounted gap fillers eliminate the need for careful alignment and, as the driver only gets the signal that the doors have closed when the fillers have fully retracted, require no special synchronization on departure. Moving all active components of the system to the train instead of the platform allows maintenance to be performed in a shop, rather than in the field.

=== Germany ===
Many regional trains in Germany come with platform gap fillers, such as the Bombardier Talent 2. On subway networks, they have also become more common, as evidenced by the Nuremberg U-Bahn whose 1970s first generation VAG Class DT1 do not have them but whose VAG Class DT3 of the 2000s and 2010s and VAG Class G1 of the 2020s come equipped with automatic gap fillers.

On the Berlin U-Bahn, which has two different loading gauges (Kleinprofil on U1-U4 and Großprofil on U5-U9), so-called Blumenbretter ("flower boards") bridging the platform gap were attached to Kleinprofil trains that ran on Großprofil lines at various times of rolling stock shortage.

=== Hong Kong ===
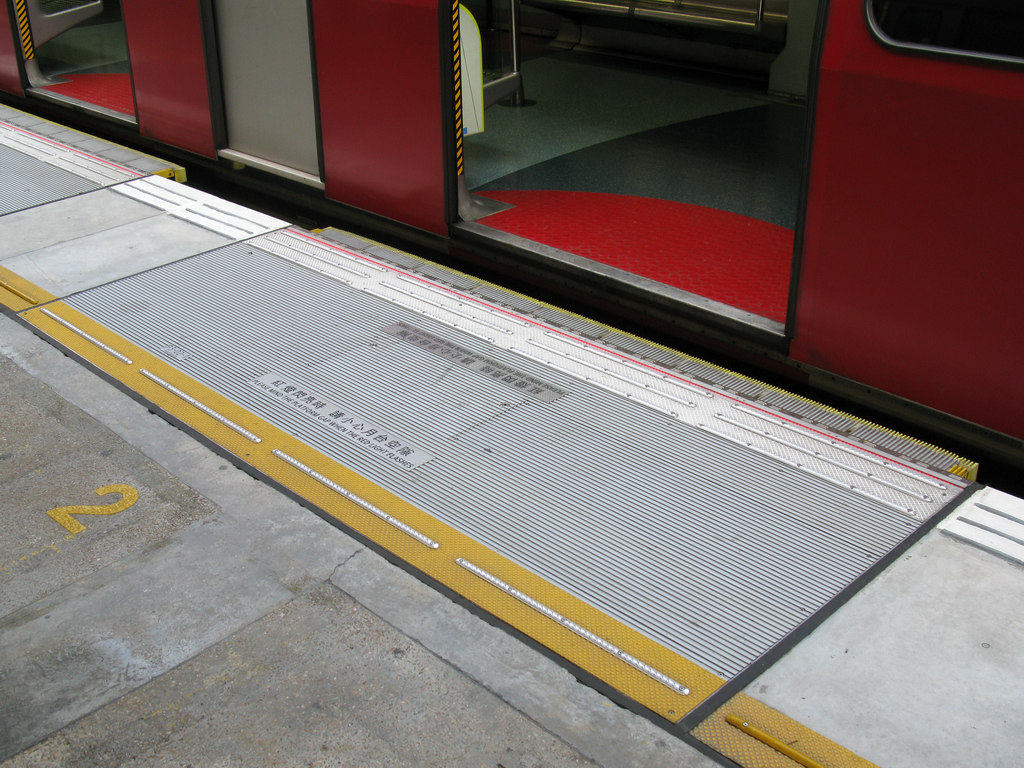
Platform gap fillers being tried at Platform 3 of Lo Wu station in Hong Kong in 2009

Platform gap fillers were tried on the platforms of Lo Wu station on the East Rail line in 2009 due to the difficulty of installing platform screen doors on the curved nature of the platforms. They were planned to be installed at other stations along the line along with signal upgrades. However, during the trial period, MTR found that the time taken for the gap filler to fully extend took 15-20 seconds and so greatly increased dwell times of trains. It was decided unsuitable for service. After the trial period ended in October 2009, the platform gap fillers were not used until it was finally removed during a platform-strengthening maintenance operation. Plans to install it on other stations of the East Rail line were also abandoned.

=== Japan ===
Some Japanese railway stations have platform gap fillers, which are known as movable steps (可動ステップ, kadō steppu). Over 200 fillers are used in the Tokyo subway. In addition, there is a program to retrofit platform doors for increased safety on Tokyo subway lines.

=== Singapore ===
Singapore has committed to specifying its newer trains with gap fillers, to reduce the incidence of platform gap accidents in its crowded stations. Platform gap fillers are used in the Mass Rapid Transit system of Singapore, namely the North South MRT line and the East West MRT line. Platform gap fillers are also planned for installation on trains on the North East MRT line and the Circle MRT line as well, because newer trains can be equipped with gap fillers.

=== Thailand ===
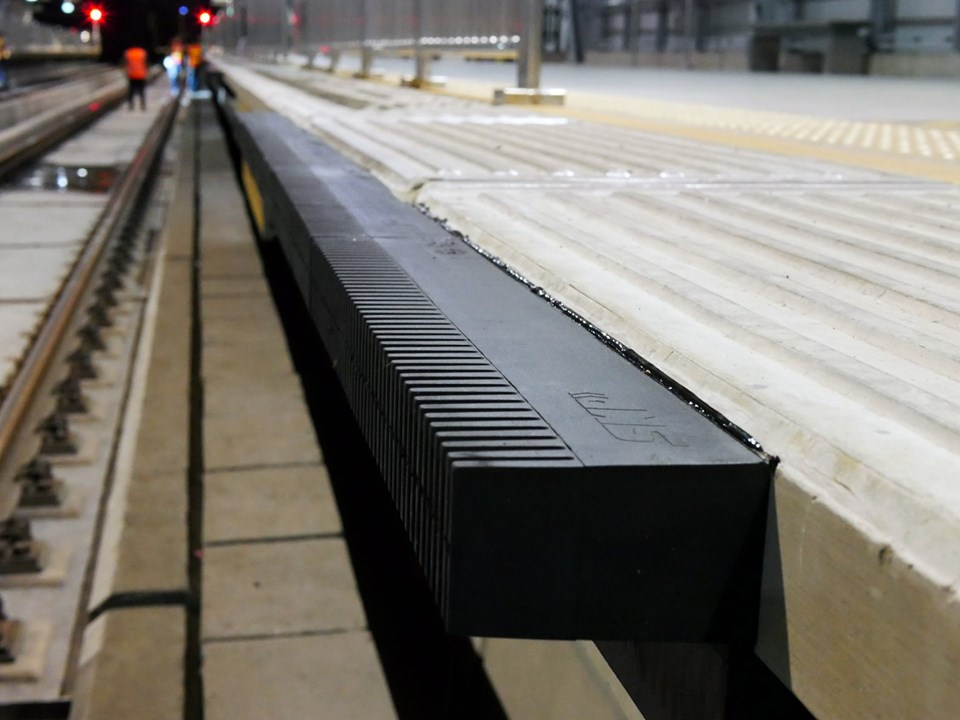
Platform gap filler in Airport Rail Link, Thailand

The Airport Rail Link has installed platform gap fillers at all 8 stations on 12 July 2019 to enhance passenger safety and convenience. These gap fillers bridge the space between the train doors and platforms, providing a safer experience for passengers. The system connects the airport to the city center, with the platform gap fillers made from locally sourced natural rubber, supporting domestic production and ensuring high quality.

=== United Kingdom ===
With the introduction of the New Tube for London, Transport for London are hoping to introduce platform gap fillers on the Bakerloo, Central & Piccadilly lines (of which 14 platforms have been identified for installation) at curved platforms such as Bank, where the gap between the train and the platform can exceed 1 foot (30.5 cm).

=== United States ===
==== New York City Subway ====
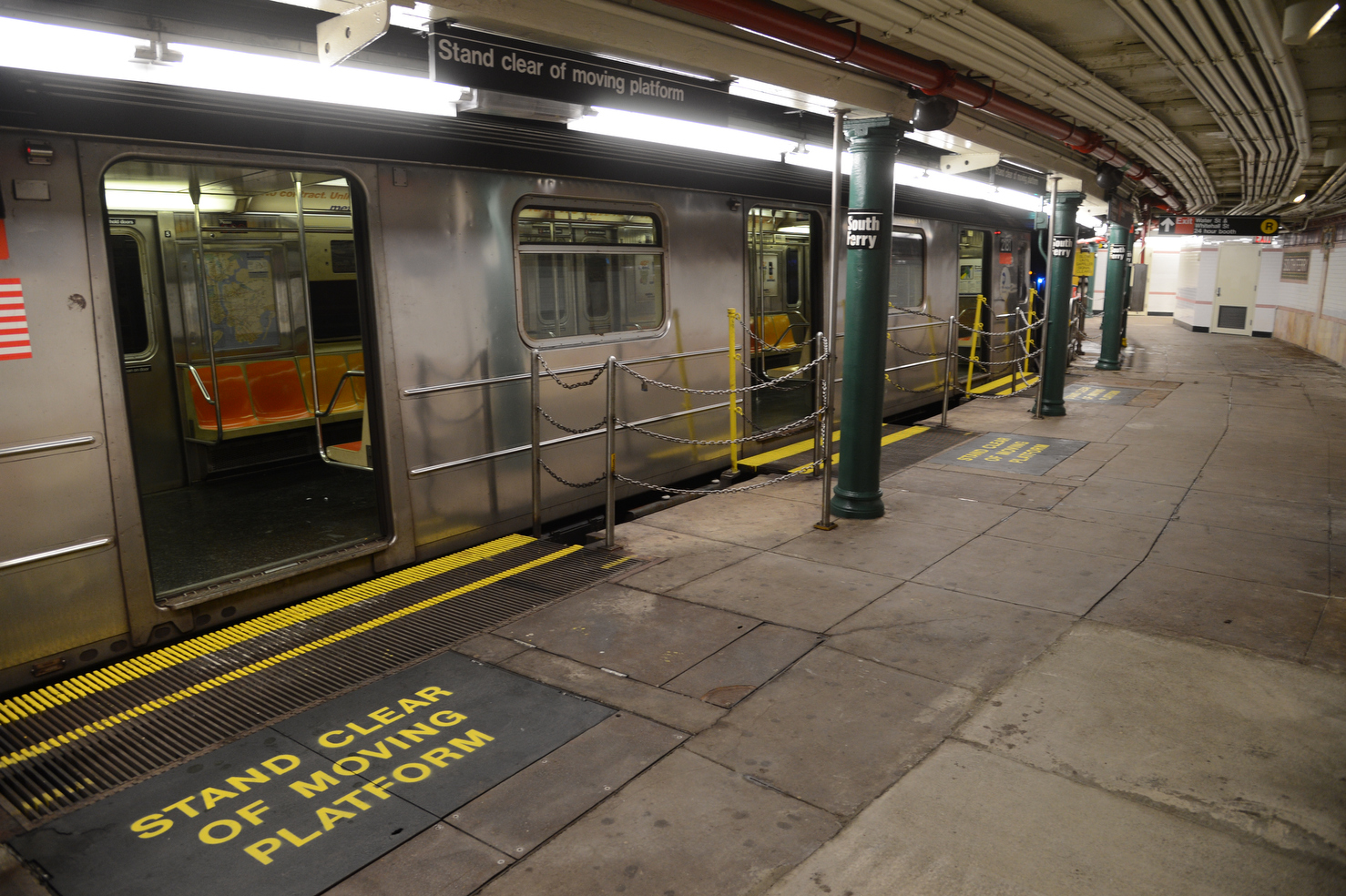
South Ferry station with gap fillers extended out to a 1 train, as reopened on April 4, 2013.

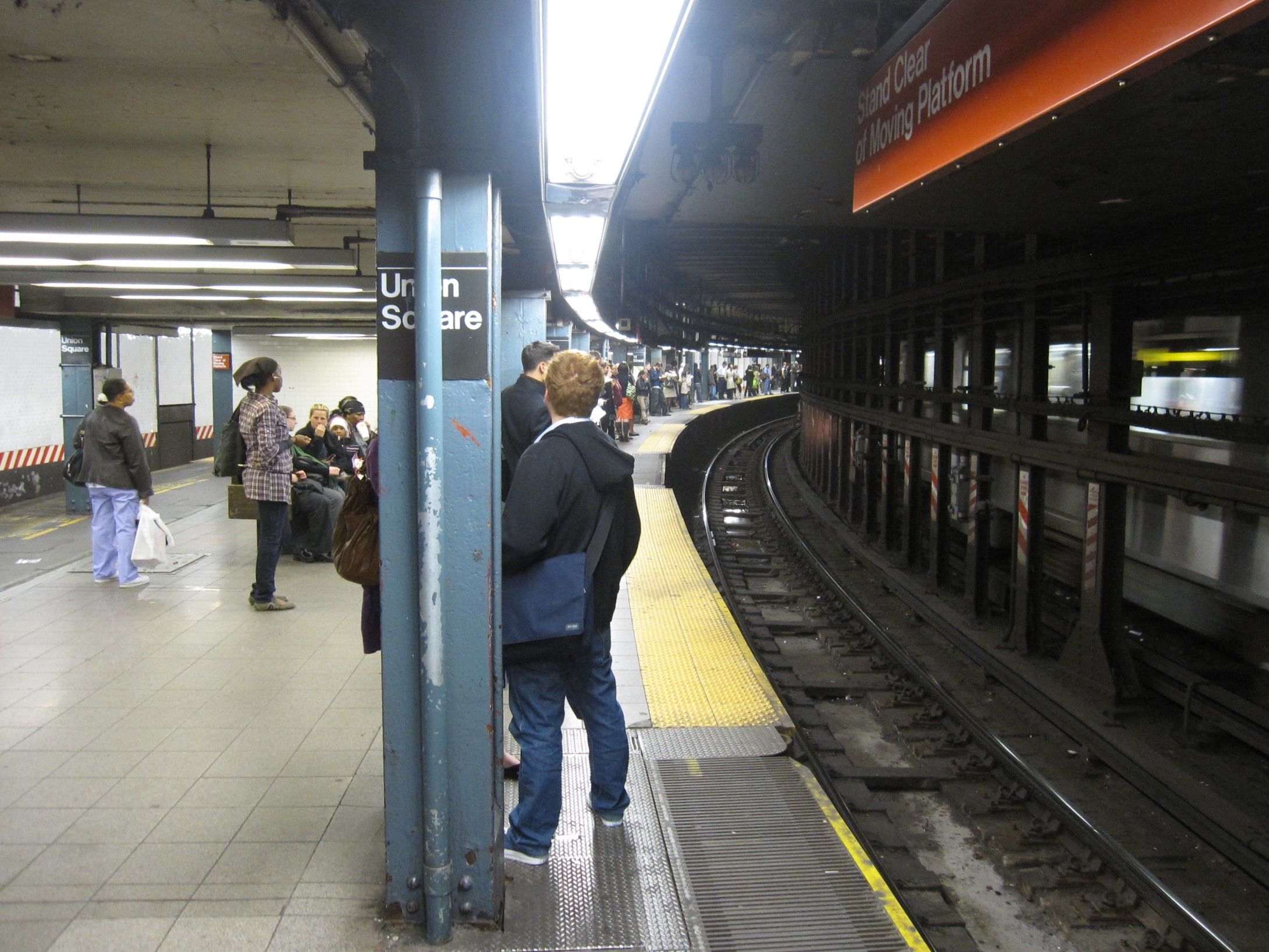
The downtown express track at 14th Street – Union Square. A retracted gap filler can be seen at the bottom of the image along the platform edge, with additional gap fillers visible in the distance.

The Interborough Rapid Transit Company's first cars were built with only two doors on each side, at the extreme ends of the car, lining up with the curved platforms so as not to leave a wide gap between the train and the platform. When the IRT modified existing cars and ordered new cars with a middle door, gap fillers were needed because the middle door was not near the platform. After the City of New York bought the IRT in 1940, new car designs (starting with the R12) had the end doors away from the extreme ends of the car body, which also required the use of gap fillers at certain stations.

===== Stations equipped =====
IRT stations with gap fillers are:

- South Ferry, outer loop. The station closed on March 16, 2009 and was replaced by a new station which does not require gap fillers. After the newer station was damaged by flooding during Hurricane Sandy, the original loop station was reactivated as a temporary terminus on April 4, 2013. The repaired newer station reopened on June 27, 2017.
- Brooklyn Bridge – City Hall (IRT Lexington Avenue Line) originally had gap fillers on the express platforms. These were deactivated when the station was extended northward. These gap fillers are still in place and can be seen just south of the current platforms.
- 14th Street – Union Square (IRT Lexington Avenue Line) has gap fillers on both tracks on the downtown platform. There may have been gap fillers on the uptown express platform. A new design of gap filler was installed in 2004 to provide maintenance access from the platform rather than requiring crews to stand at track level.
- Times Square (IRT 42nd Street Shuttle) had gap fillers on Shuttle tracks 1 and 3. They were mounted under the platform rather than on it, so they were not ADA accessible. They were removed in 2021 when the station was rebuilt.

==== Utah Transit Authority ====
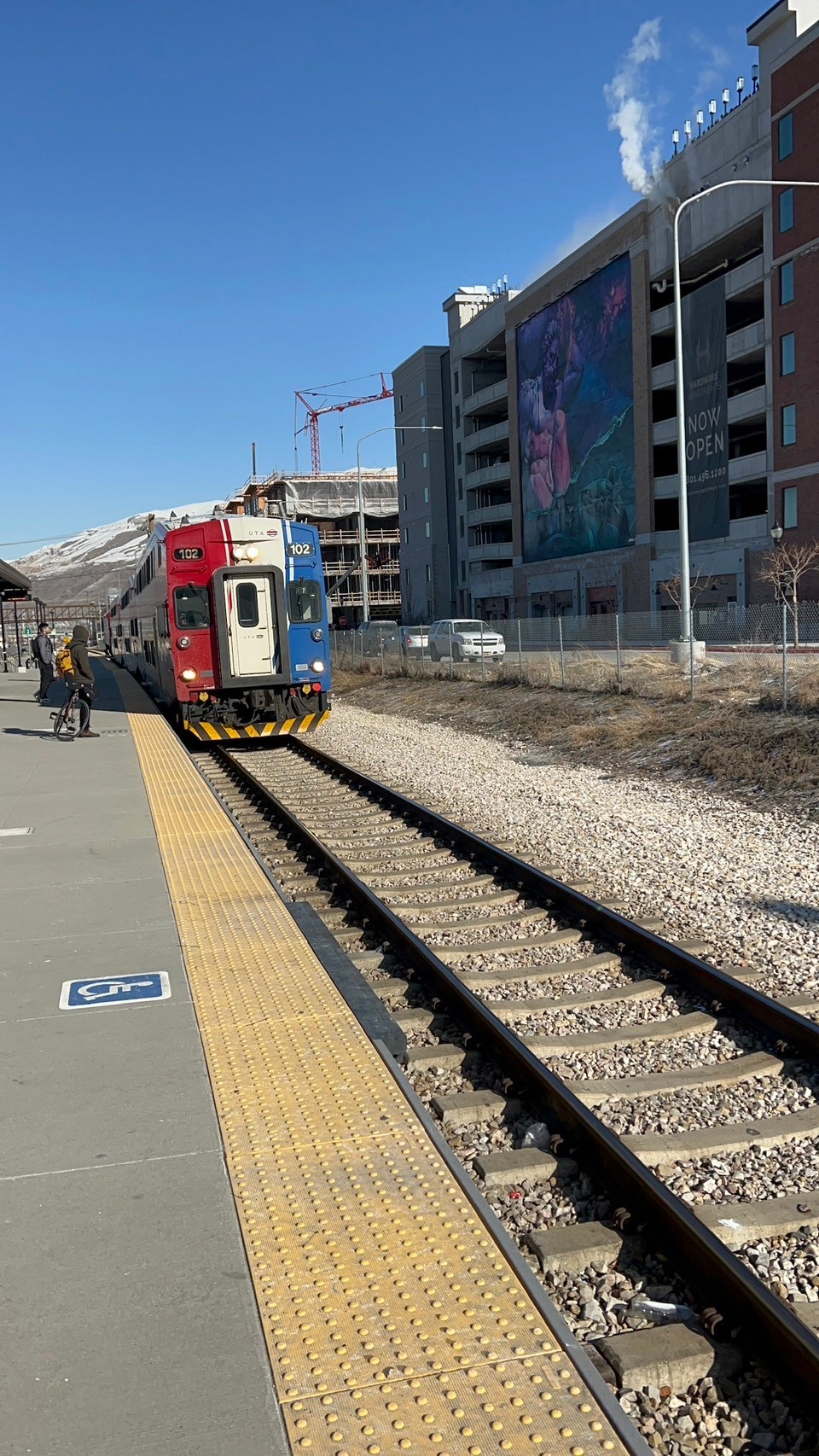
Platform gap filler installed by the Utah Transit Authority at the North Temple FrontRunner station in Salt Lake City, July 2024

The Utah Transit Authority (UTA) has installed platform gap fillers at various stations throughout the Wasatch Front within the states.

== Equipment compatibility ==
In some rail systems, significant platform gaps may also occur (both horizontally and vertically) because of equipment and platforms designed to different and somewhat incompatible height and width standards. This situation may occur especially when previously separate rail systems are consolidated, or start to interoperate, thus allowing equipment to be moved onto tracks where it had not been used before.

In 2007, public testimony by the acting president of the Long Island Rail Road cited the need to interoperate with freight service and other passenger services such as New Jersey Transit and Amtrak, in addition to its own diverse rolling stock, as complicating and slowing efforts to deal with platform gap hazards.

== Other contributing factors ==
Other variables that can increase platform gaps include rail wear, wheel wear, condition of the railcar suspension, and passenger load. A further complication is super-elevation, deliberate tilting of the railbed to allow faster travel around curves. This factor is especially relevant on systems where some express trains (such as long-distance Amtrak trains) operate non-stop through local stations located on curves. Higher pass-through speeds also increase railcar sway, requiring even larger physical clearances to avoid platform strikes.

== Specifications and limits ==
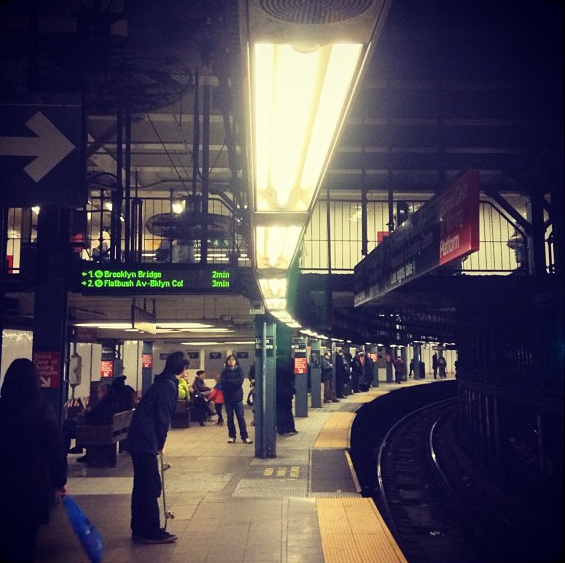
The severe concave platform curvature at 14th Street–Union Square requires gap fillers at regular intervals

In the US, the Americans with Disabilities Act requires that platforms be “readily accessible to and usable by individuals with disabilities, including individuals who use wheelchairs (49 CFR Part 37, Appendix A, 10.3.1 (9))”. However, this rule only applies to new construction or major renovations of stations. A 2009 report to the New Jersey Department of Transportation (NJDOT) observes that ADA rules specify that "At stations with high level platforms, there may be a gap of no more than 3” horizontal and 5/8" vertical between platform edge and entrance to the rail car. However, currently no passenger rail system in the U.S. has been able to achieve this without the use of manually operated 'bridge plates'.”

As of 2007, the US Federal Railway Administration recommended platform gap maximum limits of 7–10 inches (18–25 cm), and 10–13 inches (25–33 cm) on curves.

== Mitigation ==
Physical measures to reduce platform gaps may include realigning trackbeds, realigning platform slabs, and extending platform edges with wooden boards. Operational measures may include "zoning off" some railcars (not opening certain doors at problematic stations), relocating where trains stop along a lengthy platform, and temporarily deploying "platform conductor" personnel to assist passengers.

On systems where the floor level of the vehicle and the platform height closely match, an extendible platform can be installed below the doors of the vehicle, to deploy when the doors are opened. This significantly decreases the gap and thus the risks when boarding and alighting vehicles at stations or stops. This method is used by the German BR423 EMU's and its derivatives, including the Dutch variant SLT.

A public awareness campaign may be used, employing visually distinct platform edge markings, posters, signs, public safety announcements, and web videos to increase safety awareness. The MTA Long Island Rail Road website lists some precautions passengers should observe regarding platform gaps.

An article in The Guardian conceded that some passengers who have fallen into platform gaps were drunk at the time, but pointed out other incidents when victims did not have that impairment. The writer complained specifically about gaps that measured from 46 to 51 centimetres (18 to 20 in) which posed safety threats to children and the elderly, and called for modification of dangerous platforms.

== Criticism ==
In 1865, the Franklin Institute reported on 'the frequent loss of life that occurred on station platforms' and stated that 'platforms should be built up to the level of the flooring of the carriages, and that a dangerous space between the platform and the carriages ought not to exist'.

A 2009 American report identified platform gap injury risk factors, including "mobility, being elderly, having disabilities (visual impairment), being accompanied by small children or incidents occurring to small children, behavior of other passengers such as pushing or jostling, carry luggage and other articles, alcohol, degraded platform conditions such as crowding, wet platforms or uneven platforms, and stepping distances".

In 2023, British transport systems lecturer and co-founder of UK-based Campaign for Level Boarding Gareth Dennis said achieving level boarding "should be a core objective" for any operators and that it is "not acceptable" for passengers to have to worry whether there will be an attendant with a ramp at their destination. He criticised London's Crossrail project's "poor decision making" which set new inner-city station floor heights on the Elizabeth line at train floor level, while outer suburban platforms remained at their pre-existing height, about 200mm lower: "This brand-new railway has cornered itself into perpetually offering an inaccessible service."

== Incidents and accidents ==
An incident once occurred involving Robert Todd Lincoln (son of American president Abraham Lincoln) and a platform gap in Jersey City, New Jersey during the American Civil War. While waiting on a crowded train platform, Robert Lincoln was pushed against the train, and the train started to move, dropping his feet into the gap. He was saved from possible serious injury or death by the prompt actions of well-known actor Edwin Booth, whose brother John Wilkes Booth later assassinated President Lincoln.

In 2014, a news service in Mumbai, India reported several serious platform gap mutilation incidents and a death within a few months, mostly attributed to crowded conditions. In 2015, Singapore had at least two platform gap incidents which were eventually resolved, but caused significant disruptions in rush-hour service.

In 2014 in Perth, Australia, an accident occurred when a man fell between the platform and the train, and could not release his leg because the gap was too small. Other passengers "rocked" the carriage sideways to increase the gap, allowing the victim to escape.

In 2022 in Duvvada, India, a girl who was standing at the door for alighting was knocked down by the door due to a sudden jerk, and she fell into the gap between coach and the platform, In spite of immediate rescue efforts launched by authorities to free her, it took almost an hour to cut the platform and rush her to the hospital. Injuries to her internal organs led to her death within a day.

== See also ==
- Bridge plate (mechanism) – Mechanical wheelchair ramp
- Mind the gap – Warning to train passengers boarding and disembarking
- Platform screen doors – Doors separating rail platforms from tracks
- Railway platform height – Vertical distance between top of the platform and top of the rail
