= Apache Rocks the Bottom! =

Single by Scooter

from the album Who's Got the Last Laugh Now?
- B-side: "Countdown"
- Released: 30 December 2005
- Recorded: 2005
- Length: 3:45
- Label: Sheffield Tunes
- Songwriter(s): Jerry Lordan; H. P. Baxxter; Rick J. Jordan; Jay Frog; Jens Thele
- Producer(s): Rick J. Jordan; H.P. Baxxter

Scooter singles chronology
"Hello! (Good to Be Back)" (2005)	"Apache Rocks the Bottom!" (2005)	"Behind the Cow" (2007)

"Apache Rocks the Bottom!" is a 2005 single by German techno group Scooter. It was released as the second and last single from the album Who's Got the Last Laugh Now? on 30 December 2005. The song is a mix of two songs from the album: "Apache" and "Rock Bottom".

== Track listing ==
CD single

1. "Apache Rocks the Bottom!" (Radio Edit) – 3:45
2. "Apache Rocks the Bottom!" (Extended Mix) – 5:47
3. "Apache Rocks the Bottom!" (Dub Mix) – 5:57
4. "Apache Rocks the Bottom!" (Club Mix) – 5:30
5. "Apache Rocks the Bottom!" (Snippet) – 0:30
6. "Countdown" – 1:41

12"

1. "Apache Rocks the Bottom!" (Extended Mix) – 5:47
2. "Countdown" – 1:41
3. "Apache Rocks the Bottom!" (Dub Mix) – 5:57
4. "Apache Rocks the Bottom!" (Club Mix) – 5:30

Download

1. "Apache Rocks the Bottom!" (Radio Edit) – 3:45
2. "Apache Rocks the Bottom!" (Extended Mix) – 5:47
3. "Apache Rocks the Bottom!" (Dub Mix) – 5:57
4. "Apache Rocks the Bottom!" (Club Mix) – 5:30
5. "Countdown" – 1:41

Digidance, Netherlands

1. "Rock Bottom" (Radio Mix) – 3:25
2. "Apache Rocks the Bottom!" (Radio Mix) – 3:45
3. "Rock Bottom" (Video Mix) – 3:40
4. "Countdown" – 1:41
5. "Rock Bottom" (Video) – 3:40

== Samples ==
"Apache Rocks the Bottom!" samples the 1960 instrumental song "Apache" by The Shadows.

== Charts ==
Chart performance for "Apache Rocks the Bottom!"
Chart (2005–2006)	Peak position
Austria (Ö3 Austria Top 40)	23
Denmark (Tracklisten)	5
European Hot 100 Singles (Billboard)	69
Finland (Suomen virallinen lista)	2
Germany (GfK)	24
Hungary (Single Top 40)	2
Hungary (Dance Top 40)	14
Sweden (Sverigetopplistan)	47
Switzerland (Schweizer Hitparade)	54
