= Train station announcement =

Announcements providing information for railway passengers

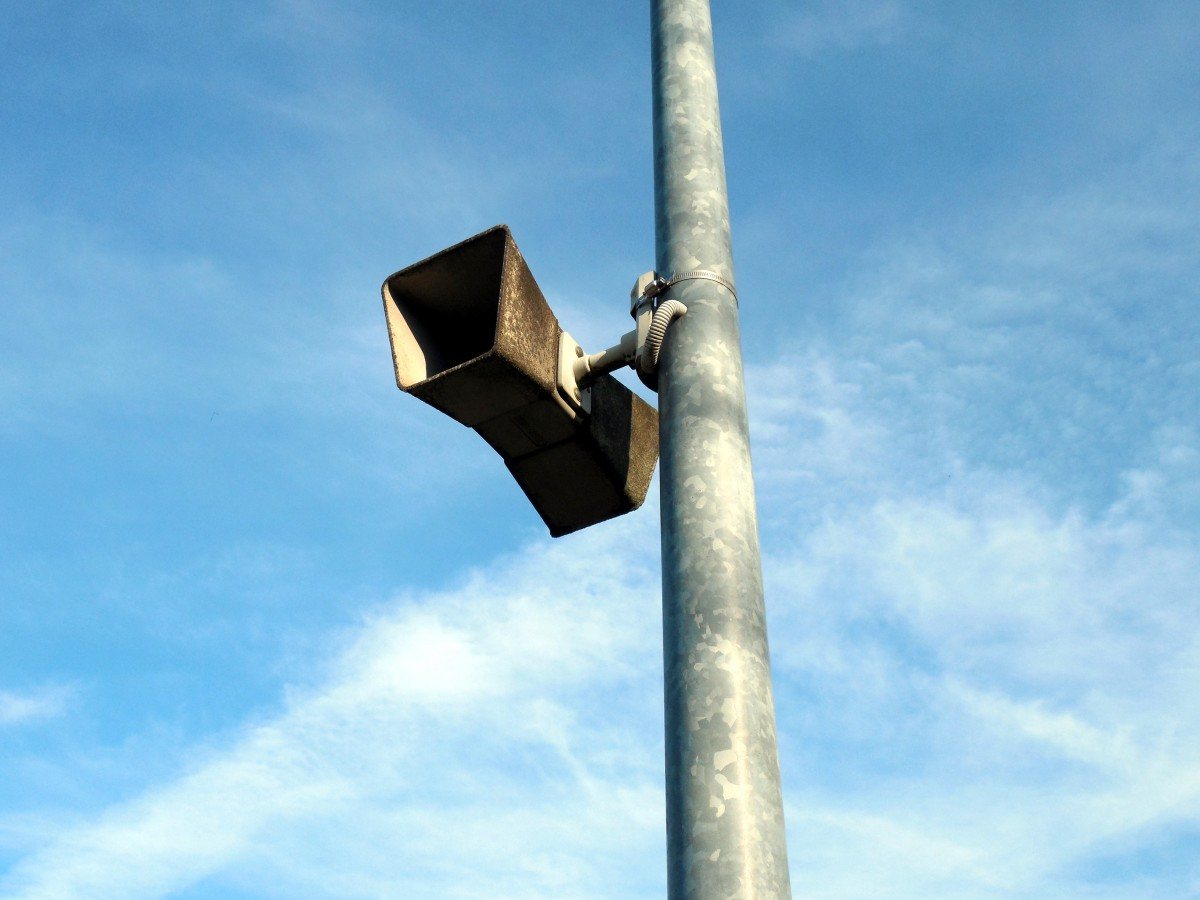
Speaker used to inform passengers

Train station announcements are used to inform passengers of the railway timetable of upcoming trains, possible changes such as delays or railway platform changes, and reminders about the non-smoking policies and to keep a safe distance between the tracks and the passengers as well as minding the gap between train and platform. A well-known phrase comes from the London Underground and is the phrase: "Mind the gap".

Train station announcements vary in length and volume. The longest announcement is in Wales, reaching a duration of almost 3 minutes, listing all 39 stations in English and Welsh.

Although train station announcements can seem outdated in addition the platform display and mobile apps, it is necessary for people with vision impairment and for warnings. In Singapore’s MRT, important train announcements are made in the four official languages.
