= Mind the Gap Films =

Irish television production company

Mind The Gap Films is an independent TV production company based in Ireland. Most of their work has been for Radio Telefís Éireann (RTÉ) or the Public Broadcasting Service (PBS). Their work has also included projects related to tourism in Ireland, and a number of music videos.

== Productions ==
- music videos for artists such as: Boyzone, The Fat Lady Sings, The 4 of Us, Caught in the Act, An Emotional Fish, A House, Something Happens, and Leslie Dowdall
- “WB Yeats Poetry: 1910–1939” (1990, for Warner Bros.)
- “Now That We Have Water” (1992, for RTÉ & Dept. of Foreign Affairs)
- “Changing Places” (1993, six-part series for UTV)
- “This is Finland” (1994, for YLE, The Travel Channel & Sell-thru)
- “Iffy Money” (1994, for RTÉ)
- “Out of sight, out of mind” (1994, for RTÉ)
- “We’re here, we’re queer, we’re Irish” (1995, for RTÉ)
- “Fintan” (1995, for RTÉ)
- North of Naples South of Rome (1995, six-part series for RTÉ, The Travel Channel and PBS)
- “Niall Tobin live at the National Concert Hall” (1996, for Sony Music)
- “Phil Coulter-The Live Experience” (1998, for K-tel and PBS)
- The Write Stuff (1995, two 13 episode seasons for ITV)
- A Good Age (1998, six-part series for RTÉ)
- “James Gandon - a life” (1996, for RTÉ & the OPW)
- “What About the Children” (2000, for RTÉ)
- “Alive Alive O!” (2000, Co-produced with Loopline Films, for the Irish Film Board, Arts Council, and RTÉ)
- “The Love That Dare Not Speak Its Name” (2001, for RTÉ)
- “The Irish Tenors” (1999, for RTÉ and PBS)
- “The Irish Tenors Live from Belfast” (2000, for PBS America and Delta)
- “The Irish Tenors Live from Ellis Island” (2001, for American Public Television, RTÉ, Delta FM, Prudential, and Tourism Ireland)
- “The Impossible Dream - My Life And Times In Song - Ronan Tynan” (2002, for PBS & RTÉ)
- “Brian Kennedy Live in Belfast” (2003, for RTÉ, PBS, & BBCNI)
- “Last One Standing” (2004, for RTÉ)
- “Happy Birthday Oscar Wilde” (2005)
- “Everyone's A Winner” (2005, for RTÉ)
- Celebrity Jigs'n' Reels (2006)
- “Anne Madden” (2006, for RTÉ)
- “The Irish Tenors & Friends” (2006, for RTÉ)
- “The Drifters” (2006, for BBCNI)
- Hands on (1995–present, series 1–11)
- “Celebrity Jigs n'Reels New Years Party” (2006/2007, for RTÉ)
