= One (Always Hardcore) =

Single by Scooter

from the album Mind the Gap
- B-side: "Circle of Light"
- Released: 6 December 2004
- Length: 3:49
- Label: Sheffield Tunes
- Songwriters: Jeroen Streunding; H. P. Baxxter; Rick J. Jordan; Jay Frog; Jens Thele
- Producers: Rick J. Jordan; Jay Frog; H.P. Baxxter

Scooter singles chronology
"Shake That!" (2004)	"One (Always Hardcore)" (2004)	"Suavemente" (2005)

"One (Always Hardcore)" is a song by German musical group Scooter. It was released in December 2004 as the third single from their 2004 album Mind the Gap. The radio edit is a remix of the song's album version, featuring more elaborate instrumental bridges.

== Music video ==
The video for "One (Always Hardcore)" was shot in the tunnel of the Elbe River in Hamburg, Germany. Footage from a concert is also featured, as well as scenes shot on the beach in Sankt Peter-Ording of lead singer H. P. Baxxter driving a 1973 Jaguar E-Type OTS (V-12) on the beach and a 1957-1961 Jaguar XK-150 in some shots behind him while he sings "Yeah!". It was directed by Andreas Bardét and Tim Tibor.

== Samples ==
"One (Always Hardcore)" is partially a cover of "Always Hardcore" by Neophyte, which itself is based on the chorus refrain of "Alive" by Pearl Jam, taken from the 1991 album Ten. The radio edit also contains a sample from "Move on Baby" by Italian Eurodance group Cappella.

== Track listing ==
CD single

1. "One (Always Hardcore)" (Radio Edit) – 3:49
2. "One (Always Hardcore)" (Club Mix) – 7:16
3. "One (Always Hardcore)" (Extended) – 5:28
4. "Circle of Light" – 4:20

12"

1. "One (Always Hardcore)" (Extended) – 5:28
2. "One (Always Hardcore)" (Club Mix) – 7:16

Download

1. "One (Always Hardcore)" (Radio Edit) – 3:49
2. "One (Always Hardcore)" (Club Mix) – 7:16
3. "One (Always Hardcore)" (Extended) – 5:28

== Chart performance ==
=== Weekly charts ===
Weekly chart performance for "One (Always Hardcore)"
Chart (2004–2005)	Peak position
Austria (Ö3 Austria Top 40)	5
Belgium (Ultratop 50 Flanders)	41
Denmark (Tracklisten)	18
European Hot 100 Singles (Billboard)	32
Finland (Suomen virallinen lista)	9
Germany (GfK)	7
Hungary (Single Top 40)	2
Hungary (Dance Top 40)	13
Netherlands (Dutch Top 40)	13
Netherlands (Single Top 100)	7
Sweden (Sverigetopplistan)	60
Switzerland (Schweizer Hitparade)	30

=== Year-end charts ===
Year-end chart performance for "One (Always Hardcore)"
Chart (2005)	Position
Austria (Ö3 Austria Top 40)	38
Germany (Media Control GfK)	55
Netherlands (Dutch Top 40)	96
Netherlands (Single Top 100)	83

== Certifications ==
Certifications for "One (Always Hardcore)"
Region	Certification	Certified units/sales
Germany (BVMI)	Gold	150,000^{‡}
^{‡} Sales+streaming figures based on certification alone.
