= Jigga Jigga! =

Single by Scooter

from the album Mind the Gap
- B-side: "Shinjuku"
- Released: 8 December 2003
- Recorded: 2003
- Length: 3:55
- Label: Sheffield Tunes (Germany); All Around the World (UK)
- Songwriters: H.P. Baxxter; Rick J. Jordan; Jay Frog; Jens Thele
- Producer: Scooter

Scooter singles chronology
"Maria (I Like It Loud)" (2003)	"Jigga Jigga!" (2003)	"Shake That!" (2004)

Music video
- "Jigga Jigga!" on YouTube

"Jigga Jigga!" is a single by German hard dance band Scooter. Released on 8 December 2003, the song was subsequently included on the album Mind the Gap.

== Track listing ==
CD Maxi / Download

1. "Jigga Jigga! (Radio Edit)" – 3:55
2. "Jigga Jigga! (Clubmix)" – 7:36
3. "Jigga Jigga! (Extended)" – 6:01
4. "Shinjuku" – 4:02

CD Single

1. "Jigga Jigga! (Radio Edit)" – 3:55
2. "Jigga Jigga! (Extended Mix)" – 6:00

12"

1. "Jigga Jigga! (Clubmix)" – 7:36
2. "Jigga Jigga! (Extended)" – 6:01

UK CD Maxi

1. "Jigga Jigga! (Radio Edit)" – 3:52
2. "Jigga Jigga! (Clubmix)" – 7:33
3. "Jigga Jigga! (Extended Mix)" – 5:59
4. "Jigga Jigga! (Flip & Fill Remix)" – 6:12
5. "Jigga Jigga! (Clubstar's Sunlight Mix)" – 6:14

UK CD Single

1. "Jigga Jigga! (Radio Edit)" – 3:55
2. "Nessaja (Radio Edit)" – 3:28

UK 12"

1. "Jigga Jigga! (Extended Mix)" – 5:57
2. "Jigga Jigga! (Club Mix)" – 7:32

UK Promo 2x12"

1. "Jigga Jigga! (Extended Mix)" – 6:00
2. "Jigga Jigga! (Club Mix)" – 7:34
3. "Jigga Jigga! (Flip & Fill Remix)" – 6:16
4. "Jigga Jigga! (Pez Tellet v Northstarz)" – 5:47
5. "Jigga Jigga! (Clubstar Mix)" – 6:14

== Charts ==
=== Weekly charts ===
Chart (2003–2004)	Peak position
Austria (Ö3 Austria Top 40)	9
Belgium (Ultratip Bubbling Under Flanders)	13
Denmark (Tracklisten)	17
Finland (Suomen virallinen lista)	12
Germany (GfK)	10
Hungary (Single Top 40)	3
Ireland (IRMA)	34
Netherlands (Single Top 100)	50
Norway (VG-lista)	10
Sweden (Sverigetopplistan)	24
Switzerland (Schweizer Hitparade)	45
UK Singles (OCC)	48

=== Year-end charts ===
Chart (2004)	Position
Austria (Ö3 Austria Top 40)	71
