= Mind the Gap (Scooter album) =

Studio album by Scooter
- Released: 8 November 2004
- Recorded: 2003–2004
- Studio: Loop D.C. Studios 1 and 2, Hamburg, Germany
- Genre: Eurodance; trance
- Length: 51:29
- Label: Sheffield Tunes
- Producer: Scooter

Scooter chronology
The Stadium Techno Experience (2003)	Mind the Gap (2004)	Who's Got the Last Laugh Now? (2005)

Singles from Mind the Gap
- 1. "Jigga Jigga!" Released: 8 December 2003; 2. "Shake That!" Released: 4 October 2004; 3. "One (Always Hardcore)" Released: 6 December 2004; 4. "Suavemente" Released: 7 March 2005

Professional ratings
Review scores
Source	Rating
AllMusic	3.5/5 stars

Mind the Gap is the tenth album by German hard dance group Scooter. Four singles were taken from it: "Jigga Jigga!", "Shake That!", "One (Always Hardcore)" and "Suavemente".

Three different versions of the album were released – Basic, Regular and Deluxe. The Basic Version contains all 11 studio tracks, but no booklet. The Regular Version includes booklet as well as two additional tracks with "Jigga Jigga!" and "Trip to Nowhere". The Deluxe Version includes cardboard packaging, a two-sided poster and an additional CD containing tracks from the live album 10th Anniversary Concert, which was previously released as digital download on the Internet.

== Track listing ==
All tracks are written by H.P. Baxxter, Rick J. Jordan, Jay Frog, and Jens Thele, except where noted.

No.	Title	Writer(s)	Length
1.	"Killer Bees"		1:30
2.	"One (Always Hardcore)"	Jeroen Streunding; Baxxter; Jordan; Frog; Thele	3:46
3.	"Shake That!"	Harry Wayne Casey; Richard Finch; Baxxter; Jordan; Frog; Thele	3:19
4.	"My Eyes are Dry"		2:54
5.	"All I Wanna Do"	Wyn Cooper; Bill Bottrell; David Baerwald; Kevin Gilbert; Sheryl Crow	4:21
6.	"Jigga Jigga!"		3:55
7.	"Panties Wanted"	Serhat Sakin; Matthias "Sugarstarr" Weber; Baxxter; Jordan; Frog; Thele	4:33
8.	"Trance-Atlantic"		7:53
9.	"Stripped"	Martin Gore	3:29
10.	"Suavemente"	Elvis Crespo	3:38
11.	"The Chaser"		4:10
12.	"The Avenger's Back"	Steve Cropper; Eddie Floyd	2:59
13.	"Trip to Nowhere"		5:02
Total length:			51:29

== Notes ==
- "Killer Bees" is a cover of "Mind the Gap" by The KLF from the 1987 album 1987 (What the Fuck Is Going On?).
- "One (Always Hardcore)" is partially a cover of "Always Hardcore" by Neophyte, which itself is based again on the chorus refrain of "Alive" by Pearl Jam, taken from the 1991 album Ten. The single version samples melody from the song "Move On Baby" by Cappella.
- "Shake That!" samples the song "After Dark" by Tito & Tarantula, taken from the 1996 soundtrack to the film From Dusk Till Dawn, the chorus of the KC & The Sunshine Band song "(Shake, Shake, Shake) Shake Your Booty" from the 1976 album Part 3 and the house track "The Opera House" by Jack E Makossa.
- "My Eyes are Dry" is a partial cover of Tuxedomoon's 1978 song "No Tears"
- "All I Wanna Do" samples the Sheryl Crow song "All I Wanna Do" from the 1993 album Tuesday Night Music Club.
- "Jigga Jigga!" came 2nd in a vote to choose Germany's entrant in the 2004 Eurovision Song Contest, and samples the song "Exile" from the 1988 album Watermark by Enya as well as "L'annonce Des Couleurs (The Mystery Remix)" by Mac Zimms, "Creatures" by Alex M.O.R.P.H. and "Symbols" by Fictivision vs. C-Quence.
- "Panties Wanted" is a cover of the song by Bad City Rockerz.
- "Trance-Atlantic" – the whole track samples the track "Out of Our Lives" by Active Sight (a collaboration of Fred Baker and M.I.K.E.). On the 20 Years of Hardcore re-release there is an edited version of the track from the 2005 "Suavemente / Trance-Atlantic" vinyl.
- "Stripped" is a cover of the Depeche Mode song from the 1986 album Black Celebration. On the 20 Years of Hardcore re-release it can be heard in a slightly modified version, which was played live during the 2006 "Who's Got the Last Laugh Now?" tour.
- "Suavemente", was originally performed by Elvis Crespo on the 1998 album Suavemente. On the "20 Years of Hardcore" re-release, it was replaced by the single version.
- "The Chaser" samples Diva Plavalaguna singing from the 1997 film The Fifth Element.
- "The Avenger's Back" is a half cover of Eddie Floyd's 1966 song "Knock On Wood", in particular sampling the 1979 disco version by Amii Stewart, taken from her 1979 album Knock On Wood.
- "Trip to Nowhere" samples the 2002 single "Solarcoaster" by Solarstone as well as "Cristalle (Katana Feat. DJ Precision Remix)" by Viframa.

== Charts ==
Chart performance for Mind the Gap
Chart (2004–2005)	Peak position
Austrian Albums (Ö3 Austria)	34
German Albums (Offizielle Top 100)	16
Hungarian Albums (MAHASZ)	18
Dutch Albums (Album Top 100)	83
Swedish Albums (Sverigetopplistan)	44
Swiss Albums (Schweizer Hitparade)	67

== Certifications ==
Certifications for Mind the Gap
Region	Certification	Certified units/sales
Hungary (MAHASZ)	Gold	10,000^{^}
^{^} Shipments figures based on certification alone.
