= Shake That! =

Single by Scooter

from the album Mind the Gap
- B-side: "Suffix"
- Released: 4 October 2004
- Recorded: 2004
- Studio: Loop D.C. Studio 1, Hamburg, Europe
- Genre: Disco house
- Length: 3:18
- Label: Sheffield Tunes
- Songwriter(s): Harry Wayne Casey; Richard Raymond Finch; H. P. Baxxter; Rick J. Jordan; Jay Frog; Jens Thele
- Producer(s): Rick J. Jordan

Scooter singles chronology
"Jigga Jigga!" (2003)	"Shake That!" (2004)	"One (Always Hardcore)" (2004)

"Shake That!" is a song by German band Scooter. It was released in October 2004 as the second single from their tenth studio album Mind the Gap.

== Track listing ==
CD single

1. "Shake That!" (radio version) – 3:18
2. "Shake That!" (extended version) – 5:03
3. "Shake That!" (Clubmix) – 5:28
4. "Shake That!" (CJ Stone Mix) – 6:36
5. "Suffix" – 2:55

Limited edition CD single

1. "Shake That!" (radio Edit) – 3:18
2. "Shake That!" (extended) – 5:03
3. "Shake That!" (Steve Murano Mix) – 5:43
4. "Shake That!" (Klubbheads Klubb Dubb) – 3:17
5. "Hyper Hyper" (special live Version) – 6:14

12" single

1. "Shake That!" (extended version) – 5:03
2. "Shake That!" (Clubmix) – 5:28

Download

1. "Shake That!" (radio version) – 3:18
2. "Shake That!" (club mix) – 5:28
3. "Shake That!" (extended version) – 5:03
4. "Suffix" – 2:55

== Samples ==
"Shake That!" samples both the song "After Dark" by Tito & Tarantula, taken from the 1996 soundtrack to the film From Dusk Till Dawn and the chorus of the KC & The Sunshine Band song "(Shake, Shake, Shake) Shake Your Booty" from the 1976 album Part 3.

== Chart performance ==
=== Weekly charts ===
Weekly chart performance for "Shake That!"
Chart (2004–2005)	Peak position
Australia (ARIA)	54
Austria (Ö3 Austria Top 40)	12
Belgium (Ultratop 50 Flanders)	41
CIS Airplay (TopHit)	5
Denmark (Tracklisten)	10
Finland (Suomen virallinen lista)	9
Germany (GfK)	8
Hungary (Single Top 40)	1
Hungary (Dance Top 40)	2
Netherlands (Dutch Top 40)	31
Netherlands (Single Top 100)	24
Norway (VG-lista)	4
Russia Airplay (TopHit)	5
Spain (PROMUSICAE)	20
Sweden (Sverigetopplistan)	12
Switzerland (Schweizer Hitparade)	38

=== Year-end charts ===
Year-end chart performance for "Shake That!"
Chart (2004)	Position
CIS (TopHit)	13
Russia Airplay (TopHit)	11
