= 1983 in music =

This is a list of notable events in music that took place in the year 1983.

== Specific locations ==
- 1983 in British music
- 1983 in Japanese music
- 1983 in Norwegian music
- 1983 in Nordic music

== Specific genres ==
- 1983 in country music
- 1983 in heavy metal music
- 1983 in hip-hop music
- 1983 in jazz
- 1983 in progressive rock

== Trends ==
- CDs become popular among classical music listeners.

== Events ==
=== January–April ===
- January 1
  - ZTT Records is founded.
  - The Merchant Ivory film Heat and Dust is released. On the soundtrack, composed by Zakir Hussain, Ivory is featured on tanpura with Hussain (who also appears in the film) on tabla.
- January 8 – The UK singles chart is tabulated from this week forward by The Gallup Organization. In 1984 electronic terminals will be used in selected stores to gather sales information, and the old "sales diary" method will be gradually phased out over the next few years.
- January – Surtitles are first used in a live opera performance at a Canadian Opera Company production of Elektra.
- February 2 – "Menudomania" comes to New York as 3,500 screaming girls crowd Kennedy Airport to catch a glimpse of Puerto Rican boy band Menudo, who are playing six sold-out shows at the Felt Forum.
- February 11 – The Rolling Stones concert film Let's Spend the Night Together opens in New York.
- February 13 – Marvin Gaye performs "The Star-Spangled Banner" before the NBA All-Star Game.
- February 23 – The 25th Annual Grammy Awards are presented in Los Angeles, hosted by John Denver. Toto win both Album of the Year (for Toto IV) and Record of the Year (for "Rosanna"), while Willie Nelson's cover of "Always on My Mind" wins Song of the Year. Men at Work win Best New Artist.
- February 26 – Michael Jackson's Thriller album hits #1 on the US charts, the first of thirty-seven (non-consecutive) weeks it would spend there on its way to becoming the biggest-selling album of all time.
- March 2 – Compact discs go on sale in the Europe and North America. They had first been released in Japan the previous October.
- March 4 – Neil Young cancels the remainder of his tour after collapsing backstage in Louisville, Kentucky, United States, after playing for seventy-five minutes.
- March 5 – Thompson Twins have their first chart success as "Love on Your Side" enters the Top 10 in the UK.
- March 26
  - Duran Duran enter the UK Singles Chart at number 1 with their first UK number 1 single "Is There Something I Should Know?".
  - Tears for Fears debut album The Hurting reaches number 1 on the UK Albums Chart.
- April 5 – US Interior Secretary James G. Watt causes controversy when he effectively bans the Beach Boys from a return performance at the Fourth of July festivities in Washington, announcing that Wayne Newton would perform instead. Watt claims that rock bands attract "the wrong element". That same week President Reagan, himself an avowed Beach Boys fan, presents Watt with a plaster foot with a hole in it.
- April 9 – David Bowie achieves his fourth UK number 1 single with "Let's Dance".
- April 11 – Dave Mustaine is dismissed from Metallica just as the band is set to begin recording its début album, to be replaced by Kirk Hammett.
- April 14 – David Bowie releases Let's Dance, his first album since parting ways with RCA Records and his fifteenth studio album overall. With its deliberate shift to mainstream dance-rock, it would become Bowie's biggest commercial success, at 10.7 million copies sold worldwide.
- April 18 – Ellen Taaffe Zwilich becomes the first woman to win the Pulitzer Prize for Music.
- April 23 – French singer Corinne Hermès, representing Luxembourg, wins the 28th annual Eurovision Song Contest, held at Rudi-Sedlmayer-Halle in Munich, with the song "Si la vie est cadeau".

=== May–August ===
- May 15 – Rita Lee concludes her Tour Brasil 83 at Maracanãzinho as the first Brazilian artist to carry out a tour in arenas and stadiums, with a record audience of 500,000 attendees.
- May 16
  - Singer Anna Vissi marries composer Nikos Karvelas.
  - The Motown 25 Special airs on NBC, celebrating a quarter century of Motown Records. Michael Jackson unveils his moonwalk dance move during a performance of "Billie Jean".
- May 28 – June 4 – The second US Festival is held at Glen Helen Park in California.
- June 3 – American rock drummer Jim Gordon commits matricide during a schizophrenic episode.
- June 18–19 – Menudo make their second visit to New York. The band plays four shows at Madison Square Garden and all 80,000 tickets sell out within three days of going on sale.
- June 20 – Catalunya Ràdio begins broadcasting.
- July 1 – Chilean Band Los Prisioneros debut at the Miguel Leon Prado High School Song festival. They will come to personify the rebellion of young Chileans leading to protests against Augusto Pinochet.
- July 6 – As a statement of protest against music piracy in the form of home taping, Jean-Michel Jarre releases only one pressing of his latest album "Music for Supermarkets", which is sold at an auction to a French real estate dealer for 69,000 francs (about US$8960). The auction is broadcast live on Radio Luxembourg which also plays the album in full for the first and only time.
- July 19 – Simon and Garfunkel begin their North American summer tour in Akron, Ohio.
- July 21 – Diana Ross performs a filmed concert in Central Park in heavy rain; eventually the storm forces her to postpone the rest of the concert until next day.
- July 29 – Friday Night Videos is broadcast for the first time on NBC.
- August 16
  - Johnny Ramone suffers a near-fatal head injury during a fight over a girl in front of his East Village apartment.
  - Singer Paul Simon marries actress Carrie Fisher.
- August 20 – The Rolling Stones sign a new $28 million contract with CBS Records, the largest recording contract in history up to this time.

=== September–December ===
- September 1 – Joe Strummer and Paul Simonon of The Clash issue a press statement announcing Mick Jones has been dismissed from the group.
- September 4 – Phil Lynott performs his final show with Thin Lizzy in Nuremberg, Germany.
- September 18 – The members of Kiss show their faces without their makeup for the first time on MTV, simultaneously with the release of their album Lick It Up.
- September 20 – The first ARMS Charity Concert is held at the Royal Albert Hall in London.
- October 29 – The 12th OTI Festival, held at the DAR Constitution Hall in Washington, D.C., United States, is won by the song "Estrela de papel", written by Jessé and Elifas Andreato, and performed by Jessé himself representing Brazil.
- November 12 – Duran Duran start their SING BLUE SILVER World Tour. The tour begins with sold-out shows in Australia
- November 26 – Quiet Riot's Metal Health album tops the US album charts, the first heavy metal album to hit #1 in America.
- December 2
  - The Uday-Ustav Festival, a tribute to Uday Shankar, is staged at the instigation of Uday's younger brother, Ravi Shankar.
  - Michael Jackson's 14-minute music video for Thriller is premiered on MTV.
  - Phish play their first show.
- December 25 – Marvin Gaye gives his father, as a Christmas present, an unlicensed Smith & Wesson .38 special caliber pistol so that Gaye could protect himself from intruders. A few months later, Gaye Sr would use it to shoot his son dead.
- December 31 – The twelfth annual New Year's Rockin' Eve special airs on ABC, with appearances by Culture Club, Rick James, Laura Branigan, Barry Manilow, Mary Jane Girls and David Frizzell.

== Bands formed ==
- See Musical groups established in 1983

== Bands disbanded ==
- See Musical groups disestablished in 1983

== Albums released ==
=== January ===
Day	Album	Artist	Notes
4	Sweet Dreams (Are Made of This)	Eurythmics	-
10	Trans	Neil Young	-
14	ExtendedancEPlay	Dire Straits	EP
14	Feline	The Stranglers	-
14	Nena	Nena	-
17	Trouble in Paradise	Randy Newman	-
18	Cuts Like a Knife	Bryan Adams	-
20	American Made	The Oak Ridge Boys	-
20	Pyromania	Def Leppard	-
21	The Law of Devil's Land	Loudness	-
28	Never Surrender	Triumph	-
31	Money and Cigarettes	Eric Clapton	US
31	Another Page	Christopher Cross	-
?	The Art of Falling Apart	Soft Cell	-
?	The Belle Stars	The Belle Stars	Debut
?	Everything Falls Apart	Hüsker Dü	-
?	G Force	Kenny G	-
?	Live Evil	Black Sabbath	Live
?	Making Contact	UFO	-
?	Strive to Survive Causing Least Suffering Possible	Flux of Pink Indians	-
?	Touch the Sky	Smokey Robinson	-
?	What Makes a Man Start Fires?	Minutemen	-
?	What's Funk?	Grand Funk	-

=== February ===
Day	Album	Artist	Notes
1	Frontiers	Journey	-
3	Powerlight	Earth, Wind & Fire	-
4	All the Best	Stiff Little Fingers	-
4	Porcupine	Echo & The Bunnymen	-
8	Michael W. Smith Project	Michael W. Smith	Debut
11	Lucky	Marty Balin	-
18	Somewhere in Afrika	Manfred Mann's Earth Band	UK
22	Kilroy Was Here	Styx	-
23	Subterranean Jungle	Ramones	-
28	Metal Health	Quiet Riot	-
28	War	U2	-
28	So Fired Up	Le Roux	-
28	The Key	Joan Armatrading	-
?	Confusion Is Sex	Sonic Youth	Debut
?	High Land, Hard Rain	Aztec Camera	Debut
?	Kihnspiracy	The Greg Kihn Band	-
?	Quick Step and Side Kick/Side Kicks	Thompson Twins	-
?	Rock Goddess	Rock Goddess	-
?	Seal in Red	Rufus	-
?	Strong Stuff	Hank Williams Jr.	-
?	Waiting	Fun Boy Three	-
?	Youngblood	Carl Wilson	-

=== March ===
Day	Album	Artist	Notes
4	Dazzle Ships	Orchestral Manoeuvres in the Dark	-
4	Thunder and Lightning	Thin Lizzy	-
4	True	Spandau Ballet	-
7	Cool Kids	Kix	-
7	The Hurting	Tears For Fears	Debut
7	Deep Sea Skiving	Bananarama	-
11	No Rest for the Wicked	Helix	-
14	Europe	Europe	Debut
14	Script for a Jester's Tear	Marillion	Debut
16	Outside Inside	The Tubes	-
21	The Final Cut	Pink Floyd	-
23	Eliminator	ZZ Top	-
28	Baby Snakes	Frank Zappa	Soundtrack
28	Jarreau	Al Jarreau	-
28	The Man from Utopia	Frank Zappa	-
30	Living in Oz	Rick Springfield	-
31	Dancing With Danger	Streetheart	-
?	The Abominable Showman	Nick Lowe	-
?	Baila Conmigo	Rita Lee & Roberto de Carvalho	International album
?	Branigan 2	Laura Branigan	-
?	A Child's Adventure	Marianne Faithfull	-
?	Dig That Groove Baby	Toy Dolls	-
?	The High Road	Roxy Music	Live EP
?	If You Leave Me Now	Chicago	Compilation
?	Inarticulate Speech of the Heart	Van Morrison	-
?	Julio	Julio Iglesias	-
?	Legendary Hearts	Lou Reed	-
?	Local Hero	Mark Knopfler	Soundtrack
?	Naked Eyes	Naked Eyes	Titled "Burning Bridges" in the UK
?	No Guts...No Glory	Molly Hatchet	-
?	Power & the Glory	Saxon	-

=== April ===
Day	Album	Artist	Notes
1	Havana Moon	Carlos Santana	-
8	Faster Than the Speed of Night	Bonnie Tyler	-
8	The Luxury Gap	Heaven 17	-
11	Let's Dance	David Bowie	-
11	Flashdance	Various Artists	Soundtrack
11	Sirens	Savatage	-
11	Style	Cameo	-
12	Murmur	R.E.M.	Debut
13	Death Party	The Gun Club	EP
13	Forged in Fire	Anvil	-
13	Mary Jane Girls	Mary Jane Girls	Debut
13	Violent Femmes	Violent Femmes	-
15	Rock for Light	Bad Brains	-
18	It	Pulp	Debut
18	White Feathers	Kajagoogoo	Debut
22	Midnight at the Lost and Found	Meat Loaf	-
25	Headhunter	Krokus	-
27	Whammy!	The B-52s	-
29	Cargo	Men At Work	-
29	Listen	A Flock of Seagulls	-
29	Hootenanny	The Replacements	-
?	You Can't Stop Rock 'n' Roll	Twisted Sister	UK; US release in June
?	Fastway	Fastway	-
?	In Outer Space	Sparks	-
?	Information	Dave Edmunds	-
?	Madness	Madness	US Compilation
?	Michael Bolton	Michael Bolton	-
?	Out of Step	Minor Threat	-
?	Pride	Robert Palmer	
?	Scoop	Pete Townshend	Compilation of unreleased tracks
?	Take It to the Limit	Willie Nelson with Waylon Jennings	-
?	Tumult	The Ex	-
?	Steve Miller Band Live!	Steve Miller Band	Live

=== May ===
Day	Album	Artist	Notes
2	Burlap & Satin	Dolly Parton	-
2	Power, Corruption & Lies	New Order	-
3	"Weird Al" Yankovic	"Weird Al" Yankovic	Debut
10	With Sympathy	Ministry	Debut
11	Zig-Zag Walk	Foghat	-
16	Piece of Mind	Iron Maiden	-
18	In Your Eyes	George Benson	-
23	Confrontation	Bob Marley & The Wailers	-
25	Holy Diver	Dio	Debut
27	Crises	Mike Oldfield	-
27	Duck Rock	Malcolm McLaren	-
27	Filth	Swans	Debut
31	Too Low for Zero	Elton John	-
31	Wrap Your Arms Around Me	Agnetha Fältskog	-
?	Another Perfect Day	Motörhead	
?	Back to Mystery City	Hanoi Rocks	-
?	Before Hollywood	The Go-Betweens	-
?	Bruiseology	The Waitresses	-
?	C'est C Bon	Carlene Carter	-
?	Chimera	Bill Nelson	-
?	The Eleventh Hour	Magnum	-
?	Feast	The Creatures	Debut
?	The First Flower	Play Dead	Debut
?	Head First	Uriah Heep	-
?	Learning to Cope with Cowardice	Mark Stewart	Debut
?	Life's a Riot with Spy vs Spy	Billy Bragg	Debut
?	Mama Africa	Peter Tosh	-
?	The Net	Little River Band	-
?	Private Collection	Jon and Vangelis	-
?	Reach the Beach	The Fixx	-
?	Ring of Changes	Barclay James Harvest	-
?	Siogo	Blackfoot	-
?	Who's Greatest Hits	The Who	US Compilation
?	You Bought It, You Name It	Joe Walsh	-

=== June ===
Day	Album	Artist	Notes
1	Speaking in Tongues	Talking Heads	-
3	Your Move	America	-
6	Plays Live	Peter Gabriel	Live
6	Allies	Crosby, Stills & Nash	Live +2 new studio tracks
9	London Symphony Orchestra, Vol. 1	Frank Zappa	-
9	Ross	Diana Ross	-
10	Body Wishes	Rod Stewart	-
10	Metal Magic	Pantera	debut
10	Mommy's Little Monster	Social Distortion	-
10	Oil on Canvas	Japan	Live
10	State of Confusion	The Kinks	-
10	This Means War	Tank	-
10	The Wild Heart	Stevie Nicks	-
13	It's Only Rock & Roll	Waylon Jennings	-
13	Texas Flood	Stevie Ray Vaughan	debut
13	Seance	The Church	-
13	She Works Hard for the Money	Donna Summer	-
15	Escapade	Tim Finn	-
16	Old Wave	Ringo Starr	-
17	Bite	Altered Images	-
17	Synchronicity	The Police	-
24	Secret Messages	Electric Light Orchestra	-
30	Keep it Up	Loverboy	-
?	Works	Pink Floyd	Compilation
?	Diamond Jack and the Queen of Pain	Kevin Ayers	-
?	Farewell Tour	Doobie Brothers	Live
?	Field Day	Marshall Crenshaw	-
?	The Fugitive	Tony Banks	-
?	Girl at Her Volcano	Rickie Lee Jones	EP
?	Hand of Kindness	Richard Thompson	-
?	Sound Elixir	Nazareth	-
?	Staying Alive	Bee Gees	Soundtrack
?	You Gotta Say Yes to Another Excess	Yello	-
?	Variations on a Theme	David Thomas & the Pedestrians	-

=== July ===
Day	Album	Artist	Notes
1	Fantastic	Wham!	Debut
1	Into Glory Ride	Manowar	-
4	You and Me Both	Yazoo	-
5	Suicidal Tendencies	Suicidal Tendencies	Debut
11	The Look	Shalamar	-
14	Get It Right	Aretha Franklin	-
15	The Principle of Moments	Robert Plant	-
15	Burning from the Inside	Bauhaus	-
15	Fire Dances	Killing Joke	-
15	The Waterboys	The Waterboys	Debut
21	Burning Farm	Shonen Knife	-
21	Golden Shower of Hits	Circle Jerks	-
22	No Parlez	Paul Young	Debut
25	Kill 'em All	Metallica	Debut
26	Good for Your Soul	Oingo Boingo	-
27	Everybody's Rockin'	Neil Young and the Shocking Pinks	-
27	It's Your Night	James Ingram	Debut
27	Madonna	Madonna	Debut
29	The Crossing	Big Country	Debut
29	Apollo: Atmospheres and Soundtracks	Brian Eno	-
?	Album	Joan Jett	-
?	All of the Good Ones Are Taken	Ian Hunter	-
?	Close to the Bone	Tom Tom Club	-
?	Beat Street	Prism	-
?	Butthole Surfers	Butthole Surfers	Debut EP
?	Drastic Measures	Kansas	-
?	Outta Hand	Coney Hatch	-
?	Out For Blood	Lita Ford	-
?	The Real Macaw	Graham Parker	-
?	Salute	Gordon Lightfoot	-
?	Works	Status Quo	Compilation

=== August ===
Day	Album	Artist	Notes
1	No Frills	Bette Midler	-
2	Lawyers in Love	Jackson Browne	-
5	Cold Blooded	Rick James	-
5	Punch the Clock	Elvis Costello and the Attractions	-
8	An Innocent Man	Billy Joel	-
8	Script of the Bridge	The Chameleons	Debut
9	Ark	The Animals	-
10	Stompin' at the Savoy	Rufus	Live
12	Alpha	Asia	-
12	Queensrÿche	Queensrÿche	EP
15	Next Position Please	Cheap Trick	-
15	Rant N' Rave with the Stray Cats	The Stray Cats	-
15	Future Shock	Herbie Hancock	-
19	Angstlos	Nina Hagen	-
19	Flick of the Switch	AC/DC	-
22	Construction Time Again	Depeche Mode	-
23	Ratt	Ratt	EP
26	Standing in the Light	Level 42	
30	Mummer	XTC	-
31	Eyes That See in the Dark	Kenny Rogers	-
31	Hello Big Man	Carly Simon	-
?	The Present	Moody Blues	-
?	All for One	Raven	-
?	Passionworks	Heart	-
?	Dirty Looks	Juice Newton	-
?	The Crackdown	Cabaret Voltaire	-
?	Torment and Toreros	Marc and the Mambas	-

=== September ===
Day	Album	Artist	Notes
1	Swordfishtrombones	Tom Waits	-
2	Built to Destroy	Michael Schenker Group	-
9	Bent Out of Shape	Rainbow	-
9	Blue Sunshine	The Glove	-
12	Born Again	Black Sabbath	-
12	Labour of Love	UB40	-
14	Commodores 13	Commodores	-
15	Sports	Huey Lewis and the News	-
16	Canterbury	Diamond Head	-
16	Warriors	Gary Numan	-
16	Little Robbers	The Motels	-
22	Lick It Up	Kiss	
26	Shout at the Devil	Mötley Crüe	-
26	The Golden Section	John Foxx	-
26	Into Battle with the Art of Noise	Art of Noise	EP
26	Live in Tokyo	Public Image Ltd.	Live
28	DaDa	Alice Cooper	-
28	How Many Times Can We Say Goodbye	Dionne Warwick	-
28	Righeira	Righeira	Debut
29	Caught in the Game	Survivor	-
29	Heads or Tales	Saga	-
?	Breaking the Chains	Dokken	US Remix
?	Born to Laugh at Tornadoes	Was (Not Was)	-
?	Hard	Gang of Four	-
?	In Heat	The Romantics	-
?	Is Nothing Sacred?	The Lords of the New Church	-
?	Johnny 99	Johnny Cash	-
?	Land	The Comsat Angels	-
?	Mean Streak	Y & T	-
?	Mike's Murder	Joe Jackson	Soundtrack
?	More Fun in the New World	X	-
?	Once a Rocker, Always a Rocker	The Joe Perry Project	-
?	One Particular Harbour	Jimmy Buffett	-
?	Pitt Street Farmers	The Reels	EP
?	Subject...Aldo Nova	Aldo Nova	-
?	Windows in the Jungle	10cc	-
?	What's New	Linda Ronstadt	-

=== October ===
Day	Album	Artist	Notes
3	Genesis	Genesis	-
6	Right or Wrong	George Strait	-
10	Colour by Numbers	Culture Club	-
13	She's So Unusual	Cyndi Lauper	Debut
13	Whodini	Whodini	-
14	Can't Slow Down	Lionel Richie	-
14	Snap!	The Jam	Compilation
18	Rock 'n Soul Part 1	Hall & Oates	Compilation
18	Voice of the Heart	The Carpenters	-
20	Deliver	Oak Ridge Boys	-
21	Silver	Cliff Richard	-
21	Soul Mining	The The	-
24	Catch as Catch Can	Kim Wilde	-
24	Head over Heels	Cocteau Twins	-
24	Without a Song	Willie Nelson	-
25	Uh-Huh	John Cougar Mellencamp	-
27	Midnight Madness	Night Ranger	-
27	Infidels	Bob Dylan	-
28	North of a Miracle	Nick Heyward	-
28	Zones	Hawkwind	-
31	Pipes of Peace	Paul McCartney	-
31	Star Fleet Project	Brian May + Friends	EP
31	Working with Fire and Steel – Possible Pop Songs Volume Two	China Crisis	-
?	1st	Streets	-
?	Alive, She Cried	The Doors	Live
?	Feel My Soul	Jennifer Holliday	-
?	Hell Hath No Fury	Rock Goddess	-
?	Life	Thin Lizzy	Live
?	Live from Earth	Pat Benatar	Live +2 new studio tracks
?	Man of Steel	Hank Williams Jr.	-
?	Melissa	Mercyful Fate	-
?	Metal Circus	Hüsker Dü	EP
?	Never Let You Go	Rita Coolidge	-
?	No Parole from Rock 'n' Roll	Alcatrazz	-
?	White Shoes	Emmylou Harris	-
?	Ziggy Stardust – The Motion Picture	David Bowie	Live 1973

=== November ===
Day	Album	Artist	Notes
1	Break Out	Pointer Sisters	
2	What a Feelin'	Irene Cara	-
4	Electric Universe	Earth, Wind & Fire	-
4	Have You Ever Been In Love	Leo Sayer	-
4	Hearts and Bones	Paul Simon	-
7	90125	Yes	
7	Undercover	The Rolling Stones	-
7	Strip	Adam Ant	-
8	Play Dirty	Girlschool	-
8	The Revölution by Night	Blue Öyster Cult	-
8	Yentl	Barbra Streisand	Soundtrack
10	Rebel Yell	Billy Idol	-
11	First Offense	Corey Hart	-
11	Speeding Time	Carole King	-
12	Bombom	Rita Lee	-
14	Beauty Stab	ABC	-
14	Believer	Chic	-
14	Touch	Eurythmics	-
15	It's About Time	John Denver	-
18	Walk Into Light	Ian Anderson	-
21	Seven and the Ragged Tiger	Duran Duran	-
21	Under a Blood Red Sky	U2	Live
25	Back to Back	Status Quo	-
25	I'm in Love Again	Patti LaBelle	-
25	Nocturne	Siouxsie and the Banshees	Live
25	You Broke My Heart in 17 Places	Tracey Ullman	-
28	Now That's What I Call Music	Various Artists	Compilation
30	Into the Unknown	Bad Religion	-
?	Buzz or Howl Under the Influence of Heat	Minutemen	-
?	Bombom	Rita Lee & Roberto de Carvalho	-
?	Clics Modernos	Charly Garcia	-
?	Cloak and Dagger	Witchfynde	-
?	Conflicting Emotions	Split Enz	-
?	Greatest Hits Volume II	Barry Manilow	Compilation
?	Music For Films Volume 2	Brian Eno	-
?	The Politics of Dancing	Re-Flex	-
?	Treeless Plain	The Triffids	-

=== December ===
Day	Album	Artist	Notes
2	The Amazing Kamikaze Syndrome	Slade	-
2	Show No Mercy	Slayer	-
2	Bark at the Moon	Ozzy Osbourne	-
5	Balls to the Wall	Accept	-
12	Earth A.D./Wolfs Blood	Misfits	-
12	Perverted By Language	The Fall	-
14	Service	Yellow Magic Orchestra	-
16	Japanese Whispers	The Cure	Compilation
20	You Shouldn't-Nuf Bit Fish	George Clinton	-
?	Amore	The Hooters	-
?	Crystal Logic	Manilla Road	-

=== Release date unknown ===
- 21 Years On – The Dubliners (live)
- Ageless Medley EP – Amy Grant
- Ain't It Good to Be Free – Bo Diddley
- All Alone with Friends – Hank Marvin
- Andrew Cyrille Meets Brötzmann in Berlin – Andrew Cyrille and Peter Brötzmann
- Bad Influence – Robert Cray
- Bay of Kings – Steve Hackett
- Behind the Scenes – Reba McEntire
- The Brightest Smile in Town – Dr. John
- The Brightest Smile in Town (Dr. John Plays Mac Rebennack, Vol. 2) – Dr. John
- Burnin' the Ice - Die Haut
- A Call to Us All – Teri Desario
- Cheap at Half the Price – Fred Frith
- Chazablanca – Chaz Jankel
- A Christmas Album – Amy Grant
- Come Away with ESG – ESG
- Dagger and Guitar – Sort Sol
- Dancing for Mental Health – Will Powers (actually Lynn Goldsmith)
- David Grisman's Acoustic Christmas – David Grisman
- Dawg Jazz/Dawg Grass – David Grisman
- Desperate – Divinyls
- Dressed for the Occasion – Cliff Richard and The London Philharmonic Orchestra (Live)
- Doot-Doot – Freur
- Emergency Third Rail Power Trip – Rain Parade
- Even the Strong Get Lonely – Tammy Wynette
- Everywhere at Once – The Plimsouls
- Fall in a Hole – The Fall
- Feeding the Flame – Sad Lovers and Giants
- The First Four Years – Black Flag
- The Fittest of the Fittest – Burning Spear
- The Fugitive – Tony Banks
- Fortune 410 – Donnie Iris
- Friends of Hell – Witchfinder General
- Good as Gold – Red Rockers
- Good Love & Heartbreak – Tammy Wynette
- Gravity Talks – Green on Red
- Heart to Heart – Merle Haggard
- Ich halt zu Dir – Die Flippers
- Imagination – Helen Reddy
- Introducing The Style Council – The Style Council
- Jonathan Sings! – Jonathan Richman
- Killer Dwarfs – Killer Dwarfs (Debut)
- The Kitchen Tapes – The Raincoats
- Klass – Bad Manners
- Lesson Well Learned EP – Armored Saint
- Let's Go – Nitty Gritty Dirt Band
- Let's Start a War – The Exploited
- Love Is the Law – Toyah
- Merry Twistmas – Conway Twitty
- Music for the Hard of Thinking – Doug and the Slugs
- Naked – Kissing the Pink
- Night Dubbing – Imagination
- Not of this World – Petra
- One Night with a Stranger – Martin Briley
- Over the Edge – Wipers
- Party Tonight – Modern Romance
- Passionfruit – Michael Franks
- Platinum Blonde – Platinum Blonde (debut EP)
- Playback – SSQ
- Privilege – Ivor Cutler
- Prodigal Sons – The Dubliners
- Neruda – Red Rider
- Railroad – John Fahey
- Riding with the King – John Hiatt
- Secretos – José José
- Shine On – George Jones
- Shock Troops – Cock Sparrer
- Sleep in Safety – 45 Grave
- Song and Legend – Sex Gang Children
- The Southern Death Cult – Southern Death Cult
- The Spell – Syreeta Wright
- Stages – Elaine Paige
- Star People – Miles Davis
- Steeler – Steeler (Yngwie Malmsteen & Ron Keel's 1st band, This band's only release)
- Struggle for Pleasure – Wim Mertens
- Syncro System – King Sunny Ade and his African Beats
- Tales from the Lush Attic – IQ
- Thank You for the Music – ABBA – compilation
- That's the Way Love Goes – Merle Haggard
- Third Generation – Hiroshima
- A Todo Rock – Menudo
- Tougher Than Leather – Willie Nelson
- Travels – The Pat Metheny Group
- Trick of the Light – Modern Romance
- Urban Dancefloor Guerillas – P-Funk All-Stars
- Visions (Gladys Knight & the Pips album) – Gladys Knight & the Pips
- Water Sign – Chris Rea
- We Are One – Maze featuring Frankie Beverly
- Weeds & Water – Riders in the Sky
- We've Got Tonight – Kenny Rogers
- When the Going Gets Tough, the Tough Get Going – Bow Wow Wow
- Words and Music – Tavares
- XXV – The Shadows
- Yes Sir, I Will – Crass
- Yokan (Hunch) – Miyuki Nakajima
- You Ain't Seen Nothing Yet – Bachman–Turner Overdrive – compilation
- Zeichnungen des Patienten O. T. (Drawings of Patient O. T.) – Einstürzende Neubauten
- Zungguzungguguzungguzeng! - Yellowman

== Biggest hit singles ==
The following songs achieved the highest chart positions in the charts of 1983.

#	Artist	Title	Year	Country	Chart Entries
1	Irene Cara	"Flashdance... What a Feeling"	1983	(United States)	US Billboard 1 - Apr 1983 (25 weeks), US CashBox 1 of 1983, US Radio 1 of 1983 (peak 1 16 weeks), Canada 1 - May 1983 (13 weeks), Sweden (alt) 1 - May 1983 (28 weeks), France (SNEP) 1 - Sep 1983 (4 months), France 1 - Jul 1983 (5 weeks), Switzerland 1 - Jun 1983 (26 weeks), Switzerland 1 of 1983, Norway 1 - Jun 1983 (20 weeks), Italy 1 of 1983, Italy 1 for 9 weeks - Nov 1983, Canada RPM 1 for 3 weeks - May 1983, New Zealand 1 for 6 weeks - Jul 1983, Japan 1 for 2 weeks - Aug 1983, Australia 1 for 7 weeks - Jul 1983, Springbok 1 - Jul 1983 (18 weeks), France 1 for 7 weeks - Oct 1983, Oscar in 1983 (film 'Flashdance'), Golden Globe in 1983 (film 'Flashdance'), UK 2 - Jun 1983 (14 weeks), ARC 2 of 1983 (peak 1 21 weeks), Australia 2 of 1983, Grammy in 1983 (Nominated), US BB 3 of 1983, ODK Germany 3 - Jul 1983 (31 weeks) (14 weeks in top 10), POP 3 of 1983, Austria 4 - Aug 1983 (7 months), Germany 4 - Jun 1983 (6 months), Canada 4 of 1983, US Gold (certified by RIAA in Jun 1983), Japan 7 of all time (international songs) (sales 0.75), France (InfoDisc) 9 of the 1980s (peak 1, 28 weeks, 1,365k sales estimated, 1983), South Africa 9 of 1983, Holland 13 - Apr 1983 (6 weeks), Belgium 20 - May 1983 (4 weeks), Poland 21 - Jul 1983 (6 weeks), Brazil 23 of 1983, nuTsie 26 of 1980s, Billboard 50th song 26, 55th Billboard 100 30 (1983), Billboard100 31, Scrobulate 31 of gay, AFI 55, Germany 57 of the 1980s (peak 3 22 weeks), OzNet 243, RIAA 256, UK Silver (certified by BPI in Jul 1983), RYM 121 of 1983
2	The Police	"Every Breath You Take"	1983	(United Kingdom)	UK 1 - May 1983 (11 weeks), US Billboard 1 - Jun 1983 (22 weeks), US BB 1 of 1983, ARC 1 of 1983 (peak 1 20 weeks), Canada 1 - May 1983 (17 weeks), Eire 1 for 4 weeks - May 1983, Canada RPM 1 for 2 weeks - Jun 1983, Canada 1 of 1983, Springbok 1 - Jul 1983 (22 weeks), Spain 1 for 1 week - Aug 1983, Top Song of 1983 of the Billboard 50th list, US CashBox 2 of 1983, US Radio 2 of 1983 (peak 1 16 weeks), Sweden (alt) 2 - Jun 1983 (28 weeks), Norway 2 - Jun 1983 (15 weeks), nuTsie 2 of 1980s, Grammy in 1983 (Nominated), MTV Video of the year 1984 (Nominated), KROQ 3 of 1983, US Gold (certified by RIAA in Aug 1983), Poland 5 - Jun 1983 (12 weeks), South Africa 5 of 1983, Holland 6 - May 1983 (9 weeks), Switzerland 6 - Jul 1983 (6 weeks), Brazil 7 of 1983, Austria 8 - Aug 1983 (3 months), Belgium 8 - Jun 1983 (7 weeks), Germany 8 - Jun 1983 (4 months), ODK Germany 8 - Jun 1983 (19 weeks) (6 weeks in top 10), France (SNEP) 9 - Sep 1983 (1 month), France 10 - May 1983 (1 week), Australia 10 of 1983, Italy 10 of 1983, Virgin 12, Scrobulate 13 of 80s, DMDB 16 (1983), Billboard 50th song 25, 55th Billboard 100 28 (1983), Billboard100 29, Holland free40 33 of 1983, Europe 33 of the 1980s (1983), Acclaimed 38 (1983), OzNet 38, Japan (Tokyo) 41 - Nov 1988 (3 weeks), RIAA 44, POP 49 of 1983, Poland 68 of all time, TheQ 76, Rolling Stone 84, 90 in 2FM list, Vinyl Surrender 97 (1983), Belgium 110 of all time, WXPN 216, UK Silver (certified by BPI in May 1983), RYM 16 of 1983, BBC Rich Song 8 (songwriter royalties $22.3M), one of the Rock and Roll Hall of Fame 500
3	Michael Jackson	"Billie Jean"	1983	(United States)	UK 1 - Jan 1983 (30 weeks), US Billboard 1 - Jan 1983 (24 weeks), Canada 1 - Feb 1983 (16 weeks), Sweden 1 - Jul 2009 (15 weeks), Switzerland 1 - Mar 1983 (33 weeks), Belgium 1 - Feb 1983 (12 weeks), Italy 1 for 7 weeks - May 1983, Eire 1 for 2 weeks - Feb 1983, Canada RPM 1 for 2 weeks - Mar 1983, Australia 1 for 5 weeks - Apr 1983, Europe 1 for 3 weeks - Mar 1983, France 1 for 3 weeks - May 1983, nuTsie 1 of 1980s, US BB 2 of 1983, Holland 2 - Jan 1983 (19 weeks), Sweden (alt) 2 - Mar 1983 (22 weeks), France (SNEP) 2 - Feb 1983 (4 months), France 2 - Jan 1983 (2 weeks), Brazil 2 of 1983, ODK Germany 2 - Feb 1983 (40 weeks) (11 weeks in top 10), Springbok 2 - Apr 1983 (17 weeks), US Platinum (certified by RIAA in Feb 1989), US CashBox 3 of 1983, ARC 3 of 1983 (peak 1 18 weeks), Austria 3 - Apr 1983 (5 months), Poland 3 - Feb 1983 (14 weeks), Germany 3 - Mar 1983 (4 months), Australia 4 of 1983, UK Gold (certified by BPI in Mar 1983), POP 4 of 1983, Norway 5 - Apr 1983 (17 weeks), US Radio 7 of 1983 (peak 1 12 weeks), Switzerland 7 of 1983, Italy 8 of 1983, Canada 9 of 1983, US Songs 2014-23 peak 14 - Jun 2014 (1 week), South Africa 15 of 1983, 15 in 2FM list, Scrobulate 16 of pop, DMDB 23 (1983), Vinyl Surrender 30 (1982), Acclaimed 33 (1982), Europe 40 of the 1980s (1983), Rolling Stone 58, Billboard 50th song 71, 55th Billboard 100 81 (1983), Billboard100 83, France (InfoDisc) 96 of the 1980s (peak 1, 22 weeks, 1,089k sales estimated, 1983), Germany 139 of the 1980s (peak 2 15 weeks), OzNet 249, WXPN 620, RYM 4 of 1983, Guardian Pop 63, Global 33 (5 M sold) - 1983, Party 53 of 2007, one of the Rock and Roll Hall of Fame 500
4	Culture Club	"Karma Chameleon"	1983	(United Kingdom)	UK 1 - Sep 1983 (21 weeks), US Billboard 1 - Dec 1983 (21 weeks), Canada 1 - Dec 1983 (13 weeks), Holland 1 - Sep 1983 (11 weeks), Sweden (alt) 1 - Oct 1983 (20 weeks), Switzerland 1 - Oct 1983 (14 weeks), Norway 1 - Oct 1983 (18 weeks), Belgium 1 - Oct 1983 (11 weeks), Eire 1 for 4 weeks - Sep 1983, Canada RPM 1 for 3 weeks - Jan 1984, New Zealand 1 for 6 weeks - Oct 1983, Australia 1 for 5 weeks - Oct 1983, Springbok 1 - Dec 1983 (22 weeks), Europe 1 for 12 weeks - Oct 1983, Spain 1 for 2 weeks - Dec 1983, Brit best song 1984, ODK Germany 2 - Sep 1983 (20 weeks) (9 weeks in top 10), UK Platinum (certified by BPI in Oct 1983), ARC 3 of 1984 (peak 1 16 weeks), France (SNEP) 3 - Nov 1983 (4 months), Austria 3 - Nov 1983 (4 months), Germany 3 - Jan 1984 (4 months), US Gold (certified by RIAA in Feb 1984), Switzerland 5 of 1983, Canada 5 of 1984, UK sales 7 of the 1980s (1,400 k in 1983), South Africa 7 of 1984, Poland 8 - Sep 1983 (6 weeks), Australia 8 of 1983, US BB 10 of 1984, US Radio 13 of 1984 (peak 1 12 weeks), US CashBox 14 of 1984, POP 15 of 1984, Italy 16 of 1983, KROQ 25 of 1983, Brazil 34 of 1984, Scrobulate 71 of 80s, nuTsie 89 of 1980s, Holland free40 93 of 1983, UKMIX 148, Germany 159 of the 1980s (peak 2 14 weeks), France (InfoDisc) 227 of the 1980s (peak 5, 29 weeks, 720k sales estimated, 1983), OzNet 979, RYM 49 of 1983
5	Michael Jackson	"Beat It"	1983	(United States)	US Billboard 1 - Feb 1983 (25 weeks), Holland 1 - Apr 1983 (11 weeks), France (SNEP) 1 - Jun 1983 (4 months), France 1 - May 1983 (4 weeks), Belgium 1 - Apr 1983 (12 weeks), Canada RPM 1 for 3 weeks - Apr 1983, New Zealand 1 for 5 weeks - May 1983, Europe 1 for 1 week - Jun 1983, Grammy in 1983, Canada 2 - Mar 1983 (17 weeks), Switzerland 2 - May 1983 (24 weeks), Germany 2 - May 1983 (3 months), ODK Germany 2 - May 1983 (35 weeks) (7 weeks in top 10), US Platinum (certified by RIAA in Feb 1989), UK 3 - Apr 1983 (21 weeks), US BB 5 of 1983, US Radio 6 of 1983 (peak 1 15 weeks), Austria 6 - Jul 1983 (3 months), US CashBox 7 of 1983, ARC 8 of 1983 (peak 1 19 weeks), Brazil 8 of 1983, Norway 8 - Sep 1983 (10 weeks), Canada 8 of 1983, Springbok 8 - Jul 1983 (12 weeks), Australia 9 of 1983, Poland 13 - Apr 1983 (5 weeks), Scrobulate 13 of pop, Germany 2000s 14 - Jul 2009 (26 weeks), POP 17 of 1983, Sweden (alt) 19 - Aug 1983 (2 weeks), nuTsie 23 of 1980s, Sweden 37 - Oct 2009 (2 weeks), France (InfoDisc) 63 of the 1980s (peak 2, 27 weeks, 1,182k sales estimated, 1983), Europe 68 of the 1980s (1983), Italy 71 of 1983, RIAA 76, Acclaimed 154 (1982), OzNet 158, Germany 280 of the 1980s (peak 2 12 weeks), Rolling Stone 337, UK Silver (certified by BPI in Apr 1983), RYM 14 of 1983, one of the Rock and Roll Hall of Fame 500

== Top 40 Chart hit singles ==
Song title	Artist(s)	Release date(s)	US	UK	Highest chart position	Other Chart Performance(s)
"1999"	Prince	January 1983	12	25	2 (Australia)	See chart performance entry 1982 overlap
"2000 Miles"	The Pretenders	November 1983	n/a	15	11 (Belgium)	13 (Netherlands [Single Top 100]) – 14 (Ireland) – 30 (Australia) – 36 (New Zealand)
"99 Luftballons"	Nena	March 1983	2	n/a	(11 countries)	See chart performance entry
"The One Thing"	INXS	March 1983	30	n/a	14 (Australia)	2 (U.S. Billboard Top Tracks) – 30 (U.S. Cash Box Top 100) – 31 (Canada) 1982 overlap
"All Night Long (All Night)"	Lionel Richie	September 1983	1	2	1 (6 countries)	See chart performance entry
"All Time High"	Rita Coolidge	June 1983	36	75	36 (United States)	1 (U.S. Billboard Adult Contemporary) – 1 (Canada Adult Contemporary) – 38 (Canada) – 80 (Australia)
"Almost Over You"	Sheena Easton	December 1983	25	89	23 (United States)	1 (Canada RPM Adult Contemporary) – 4 (U.S. Billboard Adult Contemporary) – 23 (U.S. Cash Box Top 100) – 35 (Canada) – 68 (Australia) – 86 (U.S. Billboard Hot Country Songs)

== Number One hit singles ==
Song title	Artist(s)	Release date(s)	Date reached number one	Weeks at number one	Country(s)
"99 Luftballons"	Nena	January 1983	April 1983	14 weeks	10 countries
"Africa"	Toto	February 1983	February 1983	1 week	Canada, United States
"All Night Long (All Night)"	Lionel Richie	November 1983	November 1983	4 weeks	9 countries
"Australiana"	Austen Tayshus	August 1983	October 1983	8 weeks	Australia
"Baby Jane"	Rod Stewart	June 1983	July 1983	3 weeks	8 countries
"Baby, Come to Me"	Patti Austin and James Ingram	February 1983	February 1983	2 weeks	United States
"Baila conmigo"	Rita Lee	April 1983	June 1983	1 week	Spain
"Beat It"	Michael Jackson	April 1983	May 1983	3 weeks	6 countries"
"Billie Jean"	Michael Jackson	March 1983	April 1983	7 weeks	12 countries
"Candy Girl"	New Edition	May 1983	May 1983	1 week	South Africa, United Kingdom
"C'est la ouate"	Caroline Loeb	December 1983	February 1984	3 weeks	Italy
"Come On Eileen"	Dexys Midnight Runners	April 1983	April 1983	4 weeks	8 countries
"Dolce Vita"	Ryan Paris	July 1983	November 1983	4 weeks	5 countries
"Down Under"	Men at Work	January 1983	February 1983	4 weeks	7 countries
"Every Breath You Take"	The Police	July 1983	September 1983	8 weeks	6 countries
"Flashdance... What a Feeling"	Irene Cara	May 1983	July 1983	6 weeks	14 countries
"Give It Up"	KC and the Sunshine Band	August 1983	August 1983	3 weeks	Ireland, United Kingdom
"Gloria"	Laura Branigan	February 1983	April 1983	7 weeks	Australia, Canada
"I Like Chopin"	Gazebo	August 1983	October 1983	9 weeks	7 countries
"I Was Only 19"	Redgum	March 1983	May 1983	2 weeks	Australia
"Is There Something I Should Know?"	Duran Duran	March 1983	April 1983	2 weeks	United Kingdom
"Islands in the Stream"	Kenny Rogers and Dolly Parton	October 1983	October 1983	2 weeks	4 countries
"Juliet"	Robin Gibb	May 1983	July 1983	6 weeks	4 countries
"Karma Chameleon"	Culture Club	October 1983	December 1983	5 weeks	14 countries
"Let's Dance"	David Bowie	May 1983	May 1983	1 week	15 countries
"Major Tom (Völlig losgelöst)"	Peter Schilling	January 1983	March 1983	8 weeks	5 countries
"Maneater"	Daryl Hall & John Oates	December 1982	January 1983	4 weeks	Spain, United States
"Maniac"	Michael Sembello	September 1983	September 1983	2 weeks	Canada, United States
"Moonlight Shadow"	Mike Oldfield	June 1983	September 1983	11 weeks	10 countries
"Reckless"	Australian Crawl	September 1983	November 1983	1 week	Australia
"Red Red Wine"	UB40	September 1983	September 1983	3 weeks	7 countries
"Save Your Love"	Renée and Renato	June 1983	June 1983	2 weeks	6 countries
"Say Say Say"	Paul McCartney and Michael Jackson	December 1983	January 1984	6 weeks	9 countries
"Sunshine Reggae"	Laid Back	August 1983	October 1983	6 weeks	4 countries
"Sweet Dreams (Are Made of This)"	Eurythmics	September 1983	September 1983	1 week	Canada, Iceland, United States
"Tell Her About It"	Billy Joel	September 1983	September 1983	1 week	United States
"Too Shy"	Kajagoogoo	February 1983	February 1983	2 weeks	5 countries
"Total Eclipse of the Heart"	Bonnie Tyler	October 1983	October 1983	4 weeks	9 countries
"True"	Spandau Ballet	April 1983	May 1983	4 weeks	4 countries
"Up Where We Belong"	Joe Cocker and Jennifer Warnes	April 1983	May 1983	4 weeks	4 countries
"Uptown Girl"	Billy Joel	December 1983	January 1984	5 weeks	6 countries
"Wherever I Lay My Hat (That's My Home)"	Paul Young	July 1983	August 1983	3 weeks	Ireland, United Kingdom
"Words"	F. R. David	January 1983	March 1983	8 weeks	14 countries
"You Can't Hurry Love"	Phil Collins	January 1983	January 1983	2 weeks	5 countries

=== Other Chart hit singles ===
- "A Volar" – Menudo
- "Australiana" – Austen Tayshus (# 1 Australia)
- "Baby Jane" – Rod Stewart
- "Bad Boys" – Wham!
- "Big Log" – Robert Plant
- "Billie Jean" – Michael Jackson
- "Blue Monday" – New Order
- "Bop Girl" – Pat Wilson
- "Boxerbeat" – JoBoxers
- "Breakaway" – Tracey Ullman
- "Buffalo Soldier" – Bob Marley & The Wailers
- "Burning Down the House" – Talking Heads
- "Calling Your Name" – Marilyn
- "Candy Girl" – New Edition
- "Can't Get Used to Losing You" – The Beat
- "Change" – Tears for Fears
- "China Girl" – David Bowie
- "Church of the Poison Mind" – Culture Club
- "Club Tropicana" – Wham!
- "Come Back and Stay" – Paul Young
- "Come On Eileen" – Dexys Midnight Runners (released in 1982)
- "Communication" – Spandau Ballet
- "Countdown/New World Man" – Rush
- "Crumblin' Down" – John Mellencamp
- "Dancing in the Dark" – Kim Wilde
- "Dead Giveaway" – Shalamar
- "Dear Prudence" – Siouxsie and the Banshees
- "Delirious" – Prince
- "Der Alpen-Rap" – Erste Allgemeine Verunsicherung
- "Der Kommissar" – After the Fire
- "Din Daa Daa" – George Kranz
- "Dirty Laundry" – Don Henley
- "Do You Really Want to Hurt Me" – Culture Club
- "Don't Let It End" – Styx
- "Double Dutch" – Malcolm McLaren
- "Down Under" – Men at Work
- "Dr. Heckyll & Mr. Jive" – Men At Work
- "Drop the Pilot" – Joan Armatrading
- "Electric Avenue" – Eddy Grant
- "Every Breath You Take" – The Police
- "Everything Counts" – Depeche Mode
- "Family Man" – Hall & Oates
- "Faithfully" – Journey
- "Femme" – Dalida
- "Gimme All Your Lovin'" – ZZ Top
- "Give It Up" – KC and the Sunshine Band
- "Gloria" – Laura Branigan (released in 1982)
- "Gold" – Spandau Ballet
- "Guardian Angel" – Masquerade
- "Heart and Soul" – Huey Lewis and the News
- "High Life" – Modern Romance
- "Holiday" – Madonna
- "How Am I Supposed to Live Without You" – Laura Branigan
- "Human Nature" – Michael Jackson
- "Hungry Like the Wolf" (1982) – Duran Duran
- "I Guess That's Why They Call It the Blues" – Elton John (feat. Stevie Wonder)
- "I'm Still Standing" – Elton John
- "In a Big Country" – Big Country
- "I.O.U." – Freeez
- "Is There Something I Should Know?" – Duran Duran
- "Islands in the Stream" – Kenny Rogers and Dolly Parton
- "It's a Mistake" – Men At Work
- "Jeopardy" – The Greg Kihn Band
- "Johnny B. Goode" – Peter Tosh
- "Karma Chameleon" – Culture Club
- "King of Pain" – The Police
- "Kiss the Bride" – Elton John
- "Let The Music Play" – Shannon
- "Let's Dance" – David Bowie
- "Little Red Corvette" – Prince
- "Long Hot Summer" – The Style Council
- "The Love Cats" – The Cure
- "Love Is a Battlefield" – Pat Benatar
- "Love Is a Stranger" – Eurythmics
- "Love of the Common People" – Paul Young
- "Love On Your Side" – Thompson Twins
- "Mad World"- Tears For Fears
- "Major Tom (Coming Home)" – Peter Schilling
- "Mama" – Genesis
- "Maniac" – Michael Sembello
- "Many Rivers to Cross" – UB40
- "Marguerita Time" – Status Quo
- "Modern Love" – David Bowie
- "Mon ami m'a quittée" – Celine Dion
- "Moonlight Shadow" – Mike Oldfield
- "Mr. Roboto" – Styx
- "My Oh My" – Slade
- "Nasty Girl" – Vanity 6
- "Never Gonna Let You Go" – Sergio Mendes
- "New Song" – Howard Jones
- "New Year's Day" – U2
- "Nobody's Diary" – Yazoo
- "Oblivious" – Aztec Camera
- "One on One" – Hall & Oates
- "One Thing Leads to Another" – The Fixx
- "Only for Love" – Limahl
- "Only You" – Various
- "Our House" – Madness
- "Our Lips Are Sealed" – Fun Boy Three
- "Over and Over" – Shalamar
- "Overkill" – Men at Work
- "Owner of a Lonely Heart" – Yes
- "Pale Shelter" – Tears for Fears
- "Photograph" – Def Leppard
- "Physical Attraction"- Madonna
- "Pink Houses" – John Mellencamp
- "Pipes Of Peace" – Paul McCartney
- "Power and the Passion" – Midnight Oil
- "Pride and Joy" – Stevie Ray Vaughan
- "Promises, Promises" – Naked Eyes
- "Puttin' on the Ritz" – Taco
- "P.Y.T. (Pretty Young Thing)" (1982) – Michael Jackson
- "Queen of the Broken Hearts" – Loverboy
- "Radio Free Europe" (I.R.S. version) – R.E.M.
- "Rainbow in the Dark" – Dio
- "Rio" (1982) – Duran Duran
- "Rip It Up" – Orange Juice
- "Rock 'n' Roll Is King" – Electric Light Orchestra
- "Rock of Ages" – Def Leppard
- "Rock the Casbah" – The Clash (released in 1982)
- "Rockit" – Herbie Hancock
- "Run Runaway" – Slade
- "Runaway" – Bon Jovi
- "The Safety Dance" – Men Without Hats
- "Saved by Zero" – The Fixx
- "Say Say Say" – Michael Jackson & Paul McCartney
- "Screaming for Vengeance" (1982) – Judas Priest
- "Send Her My Love" – Journey
- "Separate Ways (Worlds Apart)" – Journey
- "Sex (I'm a ...)" – Berlin
- "Shame on the Moon" – Bob Seger
- "Sharp Dressed Man" – ZZ Top
- "She Blinded Me with Science" – Thomas Dolby (released in 1982)
- "She Works Hard for the Money" – Donna Summer
- "She's a Beauty" – The Tubes
- "Shipbuilding" – Robert Wyatt
- "Should I Stay or Should I Go" – The Clash
- "Shout at the Devil" – Mötley Crüe
- "Si la vie est cadeau" – Corinne Hermès
- "Solitaire" – Laura Branigan
- "Speak Like a Child" – The Style Council
- "Stand Back" – Stevie Nicks
- "Steppin' Out" – Joe Jackson
- "Straight from the Heart" – Bryan Adams
- "Suddenly Last Summer" – The Motels
- "The Sun and the Rain" – Madness
- "The Sun Goes Down (Living It Up)" – Level 42
- "Sunday Bloody Sunday" – U2
- "Sweet Dreams (Are Made of This)" – Eurythmics
- "Synchronicity II" – The Police
- "Talking in Your Sleep" – The Romantics
- "Tell Her About It" – Billy Joel
- "Tell Her No" – Juice Newton
- "Temptation" – Heaven 17
- "Tender Is the Night" – Jackson Browne
- "Thank You For The Music" – ABBA (released in 1977)
- "That's All" – Genesis
- "That's Love" – Jim Capaldi
- "Always Something There to Remind Me" – Naked Eyes
- "They Don't Know" – Tracey Ullman
- "This Charming Man" – The Smiths
- "This Time" – Bryan Adams
- "Thunder And Lightning" – Thin Lizzy
- "Time (Clock of the Heart)" – Culture Club
- "Tonight I Celebrate My Love" – Peabo Bryson and Roberta Flack
- "Too Low For Zero" – Elton John (in US & Australia; not released in the rest of UK and Europe until 1985/86)
- "Too Shy" – Kajagoogoo
- "Total Eclipse of the Heart" – Bonnie Tyler
- "Tour de France" – Kraftwerk
- "The Trooper" – Iron Maiden
- "True" – Spandau Ballet
- "Twilight Zone" – Golden Earring (released in 1982)
- "Twist of Fate" – Olivia Newton-John
- "Twisting by the Pool" – Dire Straits
- "Under Attack" – ABBA
- "Undercover of the Night" – The Rolling Stones
- "Union of the Snake" – Duran Duran
- "Up Where We Belong" – Joe Cocker and Jennifer Warnes
- "Uptown Girl" – Billy Joel
- "Vamos a la playa" – Righeira
- "Walking in the Rain" – Modern Romance
- "Wanna Be Startin' Somethin'" (1982) – Michael Jackson
- "The Way He Makes Me Feel" – Barbra Streisand
- "We Are Detective" – Thompson Twins
- "We've Got Tonight" – Kenny Rogers and Sheena Easton
- "What Is Love?" – Howard Jones
- "Wherever I Lay My Hat (That's My Home)" – Paul Young
- "White Lines (Don't Don't Do It)" – Grandmaster and Melle Mel
- "Why Me?" – Irene Cara
- "Wings of a Dove" – Madness
- "Wishing on a Star" – Rose Royce
- "The Word Is Out" – Jermaine Stewart
- "Wrapped Around Your Finger" – The Police
- "You Are" – Lionel Richie
- "You Can't Hurry Love" – Phil Collins (released in 1982)
- "Gravity Talks" – Green On Red
- "Seance" – The Church
- "Fervor" – Jason & The Scorchers

== Notable singles ==
Song title	Artist(s)	Release date(s)	Other Chart Performance(s)
"Cattle and Cane"	The Go-Betweens	February 1983	4 (UK INdie Charts)
"Original Sin"	INXS	December 1983	See chart performance entry
"Radio Free Europe"	R.E.M.	April 1983	25 (U.S. Billboard Mainstream Rock) – 78 (U.S. Billboard Hot 100)
"Rip It Up"	Orange Juice	February 1983	8 (UK Single Charts) – 23 (Ireland) – 42 (New Zealand)
"Sunday Bloody Sunday"	U2	March 1983	3 (Netherlands [Dutch Top 40]/[Single Top 100]) – 7 (U.S. Billboard Top Tracks) – 11 (Belgium)
"Synchronicity II"	The Police	October 1983	12 (Ireland) – 15 (U.S. Cashbox) – 16 (U.S. Billboard Hot 100) – 17 (UK Singles Chart) – 21 (Canada)
"Temptation"	Heaven 17	April 1983	See chart performance entry
"This Charming Man"	The Smiths	October 1983	1 (UK Indie Charts) – 15 (New Zealand) – 25 (UK Singles Chart) – 52 (Australia)

=== Other Notable singles ===
- "Crafty Fag" b/w "How to Age" – The Nightingales
- "Hope (I Wish You'd Believe Me)" b/w Sleep" – Wah!
- "I Hear Motion" – Models
- "Listening" – Pseudo Echo
- "Nag" b/w "Bits and Pieces" – Joan Jett and the Blackhearts

== Published popular music ==
- "I Guess That's Why They Call It the Blues" w. Bernie Taupin m. Elton John
- "An Innocent Man" w.m. Billy Joel
- "Karma Chameleon" w.m. George O'Dowd, Jon Moss, Roy Hay, Mikey Craig & Phil Rickett
- "Uptown Girl" w.m. Billy Joel
- "Total Eclipse of the Heart" – w.m. Jim Steinman

== Classical music ==
=== Premieres ===
Sortable table
Composer	Composition	Date	Location	Performers
Ligeti, György	Sonata for Solo Cello	1983-10-24	(France) Paris	Stilz

=== Compositions ===
- Vyacheslav Artyomov – Tristia for solo piano, organ, trumpet, vibraphone and strings
- Jean-Baptiste Barrière – Chreode I
- John Cage – Thirty Pieces for String Quartet
- Friedrich Cerha – Requiem für Hollensteiner
- George Crumb – Processional for piano
- Jean Daetwyler – Concerto for Alphorn, Flute, Saxophone and Strings No. 2
- Mario Davidovsky – Romancero, for soprano, flute (piccolo, alto flute), clarinet (bass clarinet), violin and violoncello
- Lorenzo Ferrero
  - Ellipse for flute
  - Onde for guitar
- Karel Goeyvaerts – Aquarius I (Voorspel)—L'ère du Verseau, for orchestra
- Jacques Hétu – Clarinet Concerto
- Simeon ten Holt – Lemniscaat, for keyboard (1982–1983)
- Wojciech Kilar – fanfare Victoria for mixed choir and orchestra
- Witold Lutosławski – Symphony No. 3 (1972–83)
- Krzysztof Penderecki – Viola Concerto
- John Pickard – Nocturne in Black and Gold
- Peter Sculthorpe – Piano concerto
- Karlheinz Stockhausen – Luzifers Tanz, for wind orchestra
- Iannis Xenakis – Shaar
- Morton Feldman – Crippled Symmetry

== Opera ==
- Robert Ashley – Perfect Lives (An opera for television)
- Leonard Bernstein – A Quiet Place
- Oliver Knussen – Where the Wild Things Are (children's)
- Olivier Messiaen – Saint François d'Assise
- Per Nørgård – Det guddommelige Tivoli (The Divine Circus)

== Musical theater ==
- La Cage aux Folles – Broadway production opened at the Palace Theatre and ran for 1781 performances
- Doonesbury – Broadway production opened at the Biltmore Theatre and ran for 104 performances
- Mame (Jerry Herman) – Broadway revival
- Merlin – Broadway production opened at the Mark Hellinger Theatre and ran for 199 performances
- Oliver! (Lionel Bart) – London revival
- On Your Toes – Broadway revival
- My One and Only – Broadway production opened at the St. James Theatre and ran for 767 performances
- Singin' in the Rain – London production
- The Tap Dance Kid – Broadway production opened at the Broadhurst Theatre and ran for 699 performances
- Zorba – Broadway revival

== Musical films ==
- Carmen
- Eddie and the Cruisers
- Flashdance
- Le Bal
- Mangammagari Manavadu
- Narcissus
- Neti Bharatam
- The Pirates of Penzance
- Rock & Rule
- Staying Alive
- Yentl

== Musical television ==
- Salad Days

== Births ==
=== January–April ===
==== January ====
- January 1 – Jona Weinhofen, Australian musician
- January 6 - Darja Schabad, Latvian actress and singer
- January 7 – Tosin Abasi, Nigerian-American musician (Animals As Leaders)
- January 7 - Hayley Jensen, Australian singer and songwriter
- January 11 – Seun Kuti, Nigerian musician and singer
- January 14 – Takako Uehara, Japanese singer
- January 16 – Syml (Brian Fennell)
- January 18
  - Samantha Mumba, Irish singer and actress
  - Mike Ezay, American R&B singer (Git Fresh)
  - Katie White, British singer (The Ting Tings)
- January 19 – Hikaru Utada, Japanese singer and songwriter
- January 20 – Mari Yaguchi, Japanese singer (Morning Musume) and host
- January 21 – Rapsody, American rapper
- January 24 – Frankie Grande, American actor, singer, and dancer
- January 25 – Andrée Watters, Canadian singer
- January 27 – John Lundvik, British-Swedish singer-songwriter
- January 30 – Ella Hooper, Australian rock singer-songwriter, musician, radio presenter and TV personality (Killing Heidi + The Verses)

==== February ====
- February 1 – Andrew VanWyngarden, American singer-songwriter and guitarist (MGMT)
- February 3
  - Gilad Hekselman, Israeli guitarist and composer
  - Linus Wiklund, Swedish songwriter and music producer
- February 5 – Baby K, Singaporean-Italian singer-songwriter
- February 8 – Jim Verraros, American singer
- February 10 – Bless, Canadian rapper
- February 13 – Joel Little, New Zealand record producer, musician and Grammy Award-winning songwriter (Lorde, Taylor Swift)
- February 14 – Davidior, a Korean-American record producer, audio engineer, musician, songwriter and singer.
- February 17 – Kevin Rudolf, American record producer and musician
- February 17 - Shaya, Greek singer (Hi-5)
- February 19 – Mika Nakashima, Japanese singer and actress
- February 28 – Linda Király, Hungarian-American singer-songwriter

==== March ====
- March 8 – Piano Squall, American pianist
- March 9 – Mayte Perroni, Mexican singer and actress
- March 10
  - Carrie Underwood, American singer/songwriter
  - Che'Nelle, Malaysian R&B singer
- March 11 – Thiaguinho, Brazilian singer-songwriter
- March 14 – Taylor Hanson American band member (Hanson)
- March 15 – Florencia Bertotti, Argentine actress and singer
- March 19 – Ana Rezende (Cansei de Ser Sexy), Brazilian
- March 20 - Jenni Vartiainen, Finnish pop singer
- March 29
  - Luiza Sá (Cansei de Ser Sexy), Brazilian
  - Jamie Woon, British singer, songwriter and record producer,
- March 30
  - Hebe Tian, member of the Taiwanese girl-group S.H.E
  - Scott Moffatt, Canadian guitarist and singer (The Moffats)
- March 31
  - 40, Canadian record producer, songwriter, record executive, advocate, and former child actor from Toronto, Ontario.
  - Christian Scott aTunde Adjuah, American trumpeter

==== April ====
- April 4 – Tei, Korean ballad singer
- April 8 - Jay, South Korean singer (TRAX)
- April 15 – Margo Price, American singer-songwriter
- April 16 – Marié Digby, American singer, songwriter, guitarist, and pianist
- April 18

- Ameerah, Belgian singer-songwriter
- Reeve Carney, American singer-songwriter and actor

- April 20 – Sebastian Ingrosso, Swedish DJ, actor and record producer
- April 21 – Lily Chan, Chinese singer

=== May–August ===
==== May ====
- May 8
  - Bondan Prakoso, Indonesian singer
  - Matt Willis, British musician (Busted) and presenter
- May 10 – Moshe Peretz, Israeli musician
- May 11
  - Holly Valance, Australian actress, singer and model
  - Park Hee-von, South Korean singer (Milk)
- May 14 – Anahí, Mexican singer and actress
- May 15 – Devin Bronson, American guitarist, songwriter and producer
- May 21 - Robert Harvey, English singer, DJ, musician and songwriter (The Streets)
- May 23 - Heidi Range, English singer
- May 27 – Sean Douglas, American songwriter and record producer
- May 31
  - David Hernandez, American singer
  - Michael Lynche, American singer

==== June ====
- June 2 – Brooke White, American singer
- June 3 – Kelela, American singer and songwriter.
- June 7 – Indiggo, Romanian-born American twin sisters, singer-songwriters, and reality TV personalities
- June 8 – Lee Harding, Australian singer
- June 9 – Marina Lizorkina, Russian singer
- June 10 – Jason Evigan, American musician, singer, songwriter, and record producer.
- June 15 – Laura Imbruglia, Australian indie rock singer-songwriter.
- June 16 – Jen Majura, German guitarist, bassist and singer.
- June 17
  - Connie Fisher, British actress and singer
  - Lee Ryan, British singer
  - Magnus Skylstad, Norwegian musician and record producer (Frequent collaborator with Aurora)
- June 24 – Shermain Jeremy, Antiguan singer and beauty pageant contestant
- June 27 – Evan Taubenfeld, American guitarist, singer, and songwriter (Avril Lavigne)
- June 30
  - Patrick Wolf, English singer-songwriter
  - Cheryl, former member of Girls Aloud, British singer-songwriter and television personality
  - Jamie Morrison, English drummer (Stereophonics)

==== July ====
- July 1
  - Leeteuk, South Korean singer-songwriter and actor.
  - Marit Larsen, Norwegian musician (M2M)
  - Jang Jin-young, South Korean singer (Black Beat)
- July 2 – Michelle Branch, American singer-songwriter and musician (The Wreckers)
- July 3
  - Matt Papa, American singer-songwriter
- July 4
  - Ben Jorgensen, American singer, guitarist, member of Armor For Sleep
  - Andrew Mrotek, American drummer (The Academy Is...)
  - Melanie Fiona, Canadian singer-songwriter
- July 7 – Ciara Newell, Irish singer (Bellefire)
- July 9 – Lucia Micarelli, American violinist and actress
- July 10 – Heechul, South Korean singer, songwriter
- July 11
  - Megan Marie Hart, American opera singer
  - Marie Serneholt, Swedish singer and model (A*Teens)
- July 14 – Khalil Fong, Hong Kong singer/songwriter and producer (d. 2025)
- July 17 – Joker Xue, Chinese singer-songwriter
- July 18 – Aaron Gillespie, American drummer (Underoath)
- July 20 – Jason Chan, Hong Kong Canadian singer and actor
- July 21 – Eivør Pálsdóttir, Faroese singer and composer
- July 22
  - Sharni Vinson, Australian dancer, actor and television personality
  - Arsenium, Moldovan singer (O-Zone)
  - Jodi Albert, Irish singer (Girl Thing) (Married to Kian Egan, Worked with Shane Filan)
  - Toya, American R&B singee
- July 23 – Bec Hewitt, Australian singer, dancer, and actor
- July 24 – Morgan Sorne, American singer-songwriter and multi-media artist
- July 31 – Yola, English singer-songwriter, musician, and actress

==== August ====
- August 7 – Christian Chávez, Mexican singer and actor
- August 8 – Vanessa Amorosi, Australian singer/songwriter
- August 9 – Ashley Johnson, American actress and singer
- August 14 – Sunidhi Chauhan, playback singer
- August 18
  - Danny!, American record producer/recording artist
  - Mika, British singer
  - Emma McKenna, Canadian singer-songwriter
- August 19
  - Tammin Sursok, South African-born Australian actress and singer.
  - Missy Higgins, Australian singer-songwriter, musician and actress.
- August 21 – Brody Jenner, American dj
- August 25 – James Righton, English musician, multi instrumentalist
- August 28 – Alfonso Herrera, Mexican singer and actor
- August 30 – Jun Matsumoto, Japanese singer and actor

=== September–December ===
==== September ====
- September 2 – Aimee Osbourne, English actress and singer
- September 12
  - Frank Dukes, Canadian record producer and DJ
  - Carly Smithson, Irish singer
- September 14 – Amy Winehouse, English soul, jazz, blues and rnb singer-songwriter (died 2011)
- September 17 – Jennifer Peña, American singer and actress
- September 20 – A-Lin, Taiwanese singer
- September 25 – Donald Glover, American actor, comedian, writer, director, rapper, and DJ
- September 30 – T-Pain, American rapper & singer-songwriter

==== October ====
- October 7 – Flying Lotus, American rapper and producer, founded Brainfeeder
- October 10
  - Alyson Hau, Hong Kong radio DJ
  - Jack Savoretti, English acoustic artist (Kylie Minogue)
  - Lzzy Hale, American singer, songwriter, and musician. (Halestorm)
- October 16 – Loreen, Swedish singer-songwriter and two-time winner of Eurovision Song Contest
- October 20 – Alona Tal, Israeli singer and actress.
- October 22 – Plan B, English hip-hop rapper
- Byul, South Korean singer
- October 24 – Adrienne Bailon, American singer and actress
- October 26 – Houston, American R&B singer
- October 29
  - Amit Sebastian Paul, Swedish singer (A-Teens)
  - Richard Brancatisano, Australian actor/musician
- October 30 – Diana Karazon, Jordanian singer

==== November ====
- November 7 – Forrest Kline, American singer and songwriter (Hellogoodbye)
- November 10 – Miranda Lambert, American country musician
- November 14
  - Lil Boosie, American rapper
  - Chelsea Wolfe, American singer-songwriter
- November 16
  - Fallon Bowman, South African–born guitarist (Kittie)
  - K, South Korean singer
- November 17 – El Guincho, a Spanish musician, singer, and record producer
- November 20 – Future, American rapper
- November 22 – Xiao Yu, Taiwanese singer and songwriter
- November 23 – Tristen Gaspadarek, American singer-songwriter and musician
- November 24 – Adam22, American hip-hop podcaster
- November 27 – Nyla, Jamaican singer and songwriter (Brick & Lace)
- November 28
  - Rostam Batmanglij, American record producer, musician, singer, songwriter, and composer (Vampire Weekend)
  - Tyler Glenn, American alternative singer (Neon Trees)

==== December ====
- December 3 – Sherri DuPree, American singer-songwriter
- December 12 – Katrina Elam, American country singer-songwriter
- December 15 – Brooke Fraser, New Zealand singer-songwriter, musician
- December 17
  - Kosuke Saito, Japanese DJ
  - Domino Kirke, British-American singer, doula, and actress
- December 29 – Jessica Andrews, American country music singer
- December 30 - Stevie Nicholson, Australian TV personality
- December 31 – Sayaka Ichii, Japanese singer (Morning Musume)

=== Birth date unknown ===
- unknown
  - Dan Sultan, Australian alternative rock singer-songwriter-guitarist
  - Joseph Tawadros, Egyptian-born Australian oud virtuoso
  - Riopy, French-born British pianist and composer

== Deaths ==
=== January–April deaths ===
==== January ====
- January 5 – Amy Evans, operatic soprano and actress, 98
- January 7 – Edith Coates, operatic mezzo-soprano, 74
- January 12 - Rebop Kwaku Baah, rock and jazz percussionist with Traffic and Can, 38
- January 28 – Billy Fury, singer, 42 (heart attack)
- January 31 – Lorraine Ellison, soul singer, 51

==== February ====
- February 4 – Karen Carpenter, singer and drummer, 32 (cardiac arrest due to anorexia nervosa)
- February 8
  - Charles Kullman, operatic tenor, 80
  - Alfred Wallenstein, cellist, 84
- February 12 – Eubie Blake, pianist, 96
- February 18 – Leopold Godowsky, Jr., violinist and chemist, 82
- February 22 – Sir Adrian Boult, conductor, 93
- February 23 – Herbert Howells, organist and composer, 90
- February 28 – Winifred Atwell, Trinidadian pianist, 69

==== March ====
- March 6 – Cathy Berberian, American-born mezzo-soprano and composer, heart attack, 57
- March 7
  - Igor Markevitch, Ukrainian composer and conductor, 70
  - Claude Vivier, Canadian-born composer, murder, 34
  - William Walton, English composer, 80

==== April ====
- April 4 – Danny Rapp (Danny and the Juniors), 41 (suicide by gunshot).
- April 13 – Dolo Coker, jazz pianist and composer, 55
- April 14 – Pete Farndon (The Pretenders), English bassist, 30 (drug overdose)
- April 17 – Felix Pappalardi, American producer and bassist, 43 (gunshot)
- April 23 – Earl Hines, American jazz pianist, 79
- April 30
  - Muddy Waters, blues singer and guitarist, 70 (heart attack)
  - George Balanchine, Russian-American choreographer, 79

=== May–August deaths ===
==== May ====
- May 23
  - George Bruns, film composer, 68 (heart attack)
  - Finn Mortensen, composer and music critic, 61
- May 25 – Paul Quinichette, saxophonist, 67

==== June ====
- June 2 – Stan Rogers, folk musician, 33 (smoke inhalation)
- June 25 – Alberto Ginastera, Argentine composer, 67

==== July ====
- July 4 – Claus Adam, cellist, 66
- July 5 – Harry James, bandleader, 67
- July 12 – Chris Wood, rock musician, 39
- July 23 – Georges Auric, French composer, member of Les Six, 84
- July 27 – Jerome Moross, composer, conductor and orchestrator, 69
- July 30 – Howard Dietz, lyricist, 86

==== August ====
- August 2 – James Jamerson, bassist, 47
- August 3 – Helge Bonnén, pianist and composer, 87
- August 6 – Klaus Nomi, singer, 39 (complications from AIDS)
- August 13 – Zdeněk Liška, Czech film composer, 61
- August 14 – Omer Létourneau, pianist, organist, composer and conductor, 92
- August 17 – Ira Gershwin, American lyricist, 86
- August 24 – Arkady Filippenko, composer, 71

=== September–December ===
- September 5
  - John Gilpin, dancer, 53 (heart attack)
  - Antonio Mairena, Andalusian flamenco singer, 73
- September 11 – Brian Lawrance, Australian bandleader, 74
- September 24 – Isobel Baillie, operatic soprano, 88
- September 25 – Paul Jacobs, American pianist, 53 (complications from AIDS)
- October 16
  - Øivin Fjeldstad, violinist and conductor, 80
  - George Liberace, violinist and arranger, 72
- November 3 – Alfredo Antonini, conductor, 82
- November 7 – Germaine Tailleferre, composer, only female member of Les Six, 88
- November 15 – John Grimaldi, English keyboard player and songwriter (Argent), 28
- November 19 – Tommy Evans, bassist of the rock group Badfinger, 36 (suicide)
- December 6 – Lucienne Boyer, French singer, 80
- December 11 – Simon Laks, Polish composer and violinist, 82
- December 28 – Dennis Wilson, American singer, songwriter and drummer, 39 (drowned)

=== Death date unknown ===
- date unknown – Pat Smythe, Scottish-born jazz pianist, 59 or 60

== Awards ==
=== Grammy Awards ===
- Grammy Awards of 1983

=== Country Music Association Awards ===
- 1983 Country Music Association Awards

=== Eurovision Song Contest ===
- Eurovision Song Contest 1983

== Charts ==
- List of Billboard Hot 100 number-one singles of 1983
- 1983 in British music#Charts
- Category:Record labels established in 1983
- List of Oricon number-one singles of 1983

== See also ==
- Ronald Reagan in music
