= List of number-one hits of 1987 (Italy) =

This is a list of the number-one hits of 1987 on Italian Hit Parade Singles Chart.

Issue Date	Song	Artist(s)
January 3	"The Final Countdown"	Europe
January 10	"The Final Countdown"	Europe
January 17	"The Final Countdown"	Europe
January 24	"The Final Countdown"	Europe
January 31	"The Final Countdown"	Europe
February 7	"The Final Countdown"	Europe
February 14	"Si può dare di più"	Gianni Morandi, Enrico Ruggeri, Umberto Tozzi
February 21	"Si può dare di più"	Gianni Morandi, Enrico Ruggeri, Umberto Tozzi
February 28	"Si può dare di più"	Gianni Morandi, Enrico Ruggeri, Umberto Tozzi
March 7	"Si può dare di più"	Gianni Morandi, Enrico Ruggeri, Umberto Tozzi
March 14	"Si può dare di più"	Gianni Morandi, Enrico Ruggeri, Umberto Tozzi
March 21	"Si può dare di più"	Gianni Morandi, Enrico Ruggeri, Umberto Tozzi
March 28	"Si può dare di più"	Gianni Morandi, Enrico Ruggeri, Umberto Tozzi
April 4	"Si può dare di più"	Gianni Morandi, Enrico Ruggeri, Umberto Tozzi
April 11	"Electrica Salsa"	OFF
April 18	"Electrica Salsa"	OFF
April 25	"Loving You Is Sweeter Than Ever"	Nick Kamen
May 2	"Loving You Is Sweeter Than Ever"	Nick Kamen
May 9	"C'est la ouate"	Caroline Loeb
May 16	"C'est la ouate"	Caroline Loeb
May 23	"Let It Be"	Ferry Aid
May 30	"Let It Be"	Ferry Aid
June 6	"Let It Be"	Ferry Aid
June 13	"I Wanna Dance with Somebody (Who Loves Me)"	Whitney Houston
June 20	"Let It Be"	Ferry Aid
June 27	"Let It Be"	Ferry Aid
July 4	"Let It Be"	Ferry Aid
July 11	"Let It Be"	Ferry Aid
July 18	"Who's That Girl"	Madonna
July 25	"Who's That Girl"	Madonna
August 1	"Who's That Girl"	Madonna
August 8	"Who's That Girl"	Madonna
August 15	"Who's That Girl"	Madonna
August 22	"Who's That Girl"	Madonna
August 29	"Who's That Girl"	Madonna
September 5	"Who's That Girl"	Madonna
September 12	"Who's That Girl"	Madonna
September 19	"Who's That Girl"	Madonna
September 26	"Who's That Girl"	Madonna
October 3	"Who's That Girl"	Madonna
October 10	"Bad"	Michael Jackson
October 17	"Bad"	Michael Jackson
October 24	"Bad"	Michael Jackson
October 31	"Bad"	Michael Jackson
November 7	"Bad"	Michael Jackson
November 14	"Faith"	George Michael
November 21	"Faith"	George Michael
November 28	"La Bamba"	Los Lobos
December 5	"La Bamba"	Los Lobos
December 12	"La Bamba"	Los Lobos
December 19	"La Bamba"	Los Lobos
December 26	"La Bamba"	Los Lobos

== Number-one artists ==
Position	Artist	Weeks #1
1	Madonna	12
2	Gianni Morandi, Enrico Ruggeri, Umberto Tozzi	8
3	Ferry Aid	7
4	Europe	6
5	Los Lobos	5
6	Michael Jackson	5
6	Caroline Loeb	2
7	George Michael	2
8	Nick Kamen	2
8	OFF	2
8	Whitney Houston	1
