= One Way Love =

One Way Love may refer to:

== Music ==
=== Albums ===
- One Way Love, album by The Bellamy Brothers 1996

=== Songs ===
- One Way Love (Bert Berns song) a 1964 song written by Berns and Ragovoy under the pseudonyms Russell & Meade; recorded by The Drifters, Cliff Bennett and The Rebel Rousers 1964, The Gamblers 1965, The Screamers (Germany) 1967, and latterly Dexy's Midnight Runners in 1980
- One Way Love (Agnetha Fältskog song)
- One Way Love (Hyolyn song)
- "One Way Love", a song by Bandit (band) 1978
- "One Way Love", a song by The Damned 1977 written by Nick Mason
- "One Way Love", a song by The Distractions 1980
- "One Way Love", a song by The Innocents 1980
- "One Way Love", a song by Rock Goddess from the album Rock Goddess (1983)
- "One Way Love", a song by The Undertones 1983 written by J. J. O'Neill
- "One Way Love", a song by TKA 1986
- "One Way Love", a song by Bryan Ferry from the album Frantic (2002)
