= Sexy Eyes =

Sexy Eyes is the name of:

- "Sexy Eyes" (Dr. Hook song), a 1980 song by Dr. Hook
- "Sexy Eyes" (Whigfield song), a 1996 Whigfield song
- "Sexy Eyes", a song by Rock Goddess from the album Young and Free
