= God be with you =

God be with you is a parting phrase. It may also refer to:

== Music ==
- A song on the Cranberries album To the Faithful Departed
- A song on the Rock Goddess album Hell Hath No Fury
