= Raffaël Enault =

French writer, film director, and screenwriter

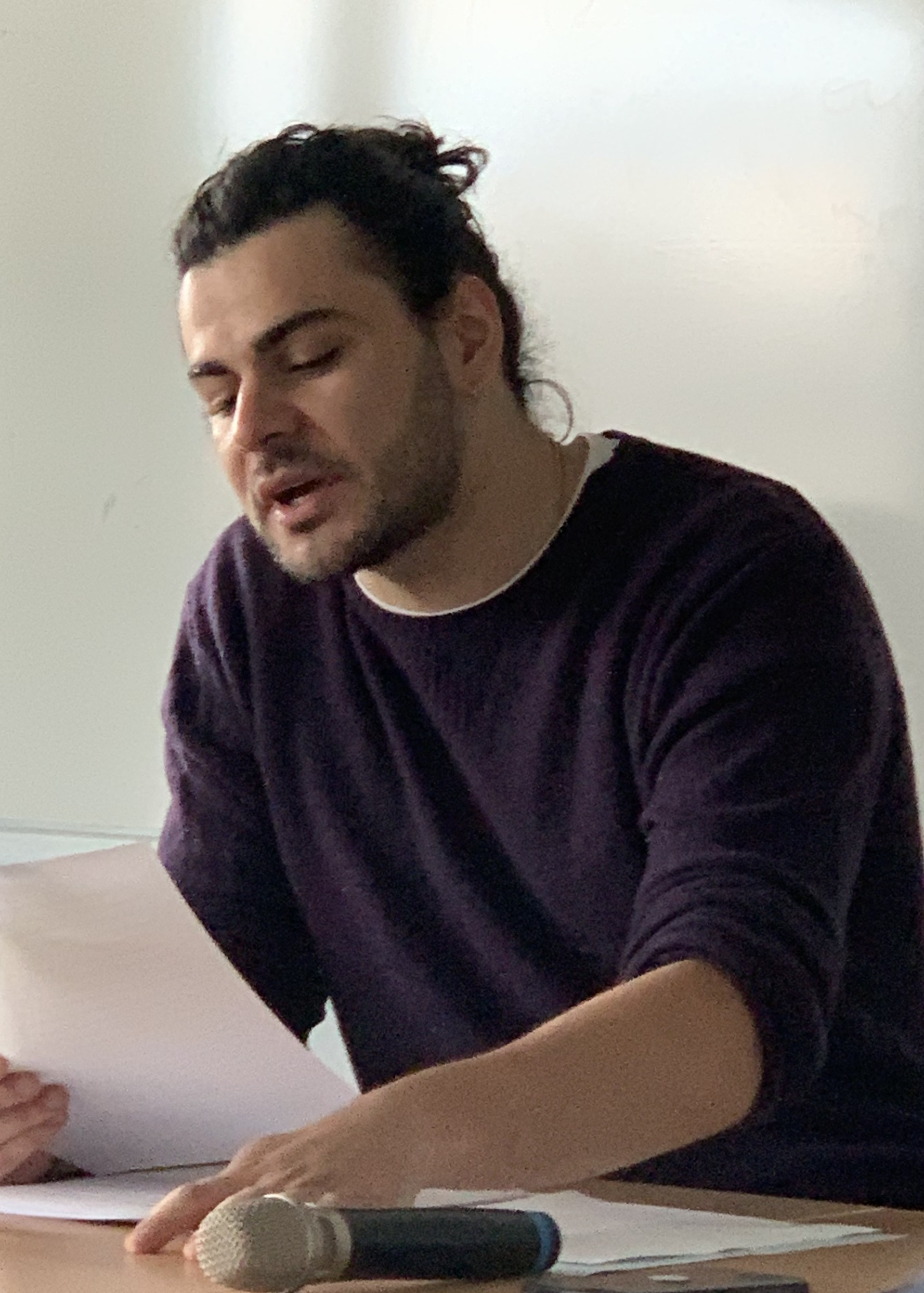
- Enault in 2019
- Born: 28 November 1990 (age 35). Rouen, France
- Occupations: Writer, film director, screenwriter
- Website: https://raffaelenault.com

Raffaël Enault (born 28 November 1990) is a French film director, writer, and screenwriter. He is known for his contributions to literature and filmmaking, notably the book Dustan Superstar, which received widespread acclaim in the press, and the film A Glimpse of Happiness, which premiered at the Oldenburg International Film Festival in 2021.

== Career ==
Raffaël Enault launched Roads Magazine in 2012, initially as a digital magazine, which later expanded to include a fashion line.

In 2014, Enault was sued by Jean-Claude Martinez after an interview was published in Roads Magazine. The incident gained further attention when Martinez was later nominated for the Prix de l'Humour Politique in 2014, related to the content of the interview.

Enault's debut book, "Dustan Superstar," the first biography of gay French writer Guillaume Dustan , garnered significant press attention in France upon its release in 2018.

In 2018, he became embroiled in a public dispute with French writer Marc-Édouard Nabe, who had published a series of defamatory articles about Enault. Subsequently, Nabe was legally condemned for these actions.

In 2019, he organized the first university colloquium dedicated to Guillaume Dustan at Paris-Diderot University, entitled "J'ai toujours été pour tout être: Guillaume Dustan ou l'infini des possibles." This scholarly event brought together academics and intellectuals to discuss Dustan's contributions to literature and queer culture in depth.

His inaugural film, A Glimpse of Happiness, which stars Caroline Loeb, premiered at the Oldenburg International Film Festival in 2021. The film received awards at various international film festivals and was subsequently released on Amazon Prime and Tubi in 2023.

In 2022, Enault directed a collective scholarly work titled "La peur : crise du siècle?", which delves into the concept of fear as a predominant crisis of the modern age.

== Selected works ==
=== Books ===
- "Dustan Superstar" (2018) – Published in French by Éditions Robert Laffont. ISBN 2221193377.
- "La peur : crise du siècle?" (2022) – Enault directed this collective scholarly book. Published in French by Éditions Camion Blanc. ISBN 9782378483050.

=== Films ===
- "A Glimpse of Happiness" (2021)
