= Young and Free =

Studio album by Rock Goddess
- Released: 1987
- Recorded: September–October 1985
- Studio: Music Works Studios, London
- Genre: Heavy metal
- Length: 44:16
- Label: JID (France)
- Producer: Paul Samson; Jo Julian

Rock Goddess chronology
Hell Hath No Fury (1984)	Young and Free (1987)	This Time (2019)

Singles from Young and Free
- 1. "Love Have Passed Me By" / "Jerry" Released: 1986 (France only)

Professional ratings
Review scores
Source	Rating
AllMusic	3/5 stars
Kerrang!	3/5 stars

Young and Free is the third studio album by the English all-female heavy metal band Rock Goddess. It was recorded in 1985 and was released in 1987 by the small French label JID exclusively in France, after the expiration of their recording contract with A&M. In 1994, Magnum Music Group tracked down the master tapes and re-released the album on Thunderbolt (with the additional title "The Lost Album"); The album also received a new album cover. In 2006 it was reissued once again with new artwork and the new title The Original Rock Goddesses. It was their last album for over 32 years until their latest and final album, 2019's This Time.

== Track listing ==
All tracks are written by Jody Turner.

Side one
No.	Title	Length
1.	"Young and Free"	2:41
2.	"Hello"	3:26
3.	"So Much Love"	4:02
4.	"Jerry"	3:36
5.	"Streets of the City"	3:12
6.	"The Party Never Ends"	3:42

Side two
No.	Title	Length
7.	"Love Has Passed Me By"	2:31
8.	"Raiders"	2:54
9.	"Love Is a Bitch"	2:47
10.	"Boys Will Be Boys"	2:15
11.	"Sexy Eyes"	3:24
12.	"Rumour"	2:54
13.	"Turn Me Loose"	3:25

1994 Reissue Bonus Tracks
No.	Title	Length
14.	"Hey Lover"	3:27

== Personnel ==
Rock Goddess

- Jody Turner – lead vocals, guitar
- Julie Turner – drums, backing vocals, lead vocals on track 7
- Dee O'Malley – bass guitar, keyboards, backing vocals

Session musicians

- Paul Samson – guitar overdubs
- Jo Julian – keyboard programming

Production team

- Paul Samson – producer
- Jo Julian – producer, engineer
- Gerrard Johnson – engineer
- Ian Cooper – mastering
