= Alyson Hau =

Hong Kong DJ

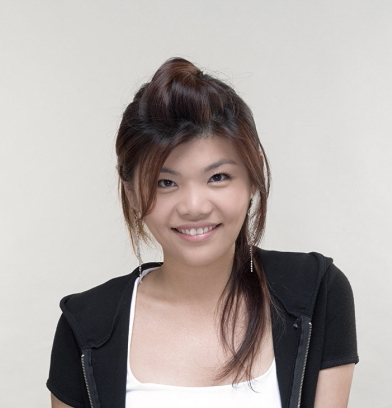
- Born: 10 October 1983 (age 42); Hong Kong
- Occupation: Disc jockey

Alyson Hau Ka-Ming (Chinese: 侯嘉明; Cantonese Yale: Hau^{4} Gaa^{1} Ming^{4}; born 10 October 1983) is a radio DJ and presenter in Hong Kong and is sometimes known by the nicknames "Allie" or "Ally". She has previously worked at Metro Radio's 104 FM Select (now called "104 Metro Finance") in 2000 and Commercial Radio Hong Kong's HMV864 (now reverted to AM 864) from 2000 to 200^{3}.

She is fluent in Cantonese, English and Mandarin.

Prior to her stint at 104 FM Select, she presented in Cantonese, after she left Metro Radio, she presented in English for at HMV 864. Currently, she continues to host programs on RTHK Radio 3. In November 2007, she was guest-producing and guest-hosting for Australia's Triple J.

Her favorite genres of music are R&B and Hip-Hop

During her time as a radio DJ, she has done freelance work, hosting in-store radio stations for the likes of HMV, Fortress, and PARKnSHOP. In addition to her radio work, she has done voiceover work for TV commercials including Crest, Watson's and others. She has worked in radio production as well, and uses programs such as, Adobe Audition (formerly Cool Edit Pro), Sadies, Sound Forge, Audio Vault and RCS for producing segments in her radio programs.

Adding to her resume, she has done some stage acting appearing in the likes of The Trojan Women and William Shakespeare's A Midsummer Night's Dream.

Her hobbies and interests are listening to music, watching movies and fashion.

She had her preschool education at Western Pacific English Kindergarten, Kowloon, Hong Kong. In 2006, she graduated from the Hong Kong Academy for Performing Arts (Drama), where she won the Outstanding Student Award and a scholarship.

She married her sweetheart Paul Measor on 29 September 2016 at the Repulse Bay Hotel. Originally scheduled for July 2016, the couple decided to reschedule the wedding in mid September as Alyson was expecting her first child.

== Interviews and events ==
Interviews - Throughout her radio broadcasting career, Hau has interviewed artists from The Ting Tings, Maroon 5 Alicia Keys, Gwen Stefani, Linkin Park, R.E.M., Hanson, Christina Milian, The Black Eyed Peas, Shayne Ward, Ronan Keating, and Paul Oakenfold. Further more, she has interviewed Il Divo, John Legend and Dolores O'Riordan (formerly of The Cranberries), Rain, Oasis, Avril Lavigne, Ian Brown, Goldie, Duran Duran, and Mika. For the local celebrities from Hong Kong, Hau has interviewed Justin Lo (側田), Ivana Wong (王菀之), Anthony Wong (黃耀明), Hins Cheung, Teresa Caprio, and Gregory Rivers (河國榮).

Events - Aside from being a radio DJ, Hau has emceed local events such as the FIFA Beach Volleyball Competition, KoЯn CD Launch, Outward Bound Boundabout, the Ted Baker launch in HK, Christian Dior luncheon event, etc.
For music events, she has attended the Rockit Hong Kong Music Festival since 2003 and the Hong Kong Music Fair.

== Programs hosted and currently hosting ==
During her radio career, she began as part of the host for Metro Radio's 104 Gigabit in 2000. She was the winner from the become a DJ contest from 104 Gigabit.
From 2000-2003, she did some programs on HMV864 like hosting the weekend mornings, the Sunday afternoon show, and then The Trendsetter on weeknights. After HMV864 went off the air, she went to RTHK Radio 3 and did some programs on the weekends and also filled in for (Uncle) Ray Cordeiro's All The Way With Ray for a week. It wasn't until Teen Time was relaunched and was co-hosted by Jennifer Su.
Hau is still hosting Teen Time from Monday to Friday at 9:00pm and a Sunday morning program, The Chart Show from 9:30am–1:00pm on RTHK Radio 3.

The Chart Show - Countdown of the Top 10 singles from UK to the US. UK Official Top 40 and Billboard Hot 100 Singles. With a request hour.

== Teen Time on RTHK Radio 3 ==
Hau became a co-host on RTHK Radio 3's Teen Time on June 12, 2006, as part of the program's relaunch. Teen Time airs from Monday to Friday, from 9 pm to 10 pm, and is sponsored by the Education and Manpower Bureau of Hong Kong. The program includes interviews with students and academic professionals, discussions on youth-oriented issues, music features, and celebrity interviews.

Teen Time can also be found in Sunday's Young Post from South China Morning Post as it is the corresponding column for their Hot Picks. Teen Time has been on the air since 1993. Segments from Teen Time include Artist Profile, Backstage, Songbite, Request, and Question of the Week. Teen Time is there to provide students an opportunity to relax and improve their English speaking skills. Another aspect of Teen Time is presenting students with related issues and interests through two segments, Open Space and Around Town. Therefore, Teen Time is valuable in helping students do well when they enter higher levels in school.

Since the beginning of 2007, Hau has been the sole host of Teen Time.

== Television appearances ==
Hong Kong representative on the successful youth TV series S’camto groundBreakers, produced by Lovelife productions and broadcast on SABC in South Africa. Filmed in both Hong Kong and Johannesburg, South Africa.

Hong Kong representative on the worldwide programme Who Are You? by Jeff Baker, produced by 33 Pix and Awake Film and broadcast on the internet through AwakeFilm.com. In talk with HBO for US National TV Broadcast.

Radio Television Hong Kong Variety Shows and Productions. Press conferences for new TV series, and other variety programmes. Broadcast on local TV channels TVB (Television Broadcasts Limited) and ATV (Asia Television Limited).

ETV Specials - 'Drama for Teaching and Learning' and 'One Day in the Life of a DJ' were broadcast on TVB Pearl and ATV World in Hong Kong. The VCD version was sent to secondary schools around Hong Kong.
