= The Brightest Smile in Town =

Studio album by Dr. John
- Released: 1983
- Label: Clean Cuts
- Producers: Ed Levine, Jack Heyrman

Dr. John chronology
| Dr. John Plays Mac Rebennack, Vol. 1 (1982) | The Brightest Smile in Town (1983) | Such a Night! Live in London (1984) |

The Brightest Smile in Town is an album by the American musician Dr. John, released in 1983. It was his second solo piano album. It was reissued in 2006, along with Dr. John Plays Mac Rebennack, Vol. 1 plus bonus tracks. In 2024, Sundazed complemented its reissues of Dr. John's early 1980s solo piano recordings by releasing Frankie & Johnny, an album of solo piano recordings from August 1981 and November 1982.

== Production ==
The album was coproduced by Ed Levine. Half of its songs are instrumentals. "Waiting for a Train" is a cover of the Jimmie Rodgers song. "Touro Infirmary", about a dead friend, was included on the album's reissue.

== Critical reception ==
Professional ratings
Review scores
| Source | Rating |
|---|---|
| AllMusic | 3/5 stars |
| Robert Christgau | B− |
| The Encyclopedia of Popular Music | 3/5 stars |
| MusicHound Rock: The Essential Album Guide | 3/5 stars |
| The Philadelphia Inquirer | 4/5 stars |
| The Rolling Stone Album Guide | 4/5 stars |

The Philadelphia Inquirer deemed the album "an uneven but charming record that peaks with his rowdy performances of 'Marie La Veau' and ... 'Average Kind of Guy'." The Globe and Mail praised the "unassuming, easy-rolling vein of New Orleans' piano playing." The Philadelphia Daily News called it "a joyous romp through various aspects of traditional and modern music from the Crescent City."

Robert Christgau noted that "too often on his second unaccompanied mostly-instrumental album he's as pleasant and boring as any other session man doing his thing." Goldmine determined that the album is "filled with glissandos, arpeggios and quiet, almost eerie, passages."

== Track listing ==
| No. | Title | Writer(s) | Length |
|---|---|---|---|
| 1. | "Saddled the Cow" | Rosco Gordon | 2:49 |
| 2. | "Boxcar Boogie" | Mac Rebennack | 5:16 |
| 3. | "The Brightest Smile in Town" | Ray Charles, Robert B. Sherman, Barry De Vorzon | 3:12 |
| 4. | "Waiting for a Train" | Jimmie Rodgers | 3:21 |
| 5. | "Monkey Puzzle" | James N. Black | 4:41 |
| 6. | "Your Average Kind of Guy" | Rebennack, Doc Pomus | 3:32 |
| 7. | "Pretty Libby" | Rebennack | 3:13 |
| 8. | "Marie La Veau" | R. L. Gurley | 3:56 |
| 9. | "Come Rain or Come Shine" | Harold Arlen, Johnny Mercer | 4:43 |
| 10. | "Suite Home New Orleans" | Rebennack | 3:51 |
