= Lily Chan =

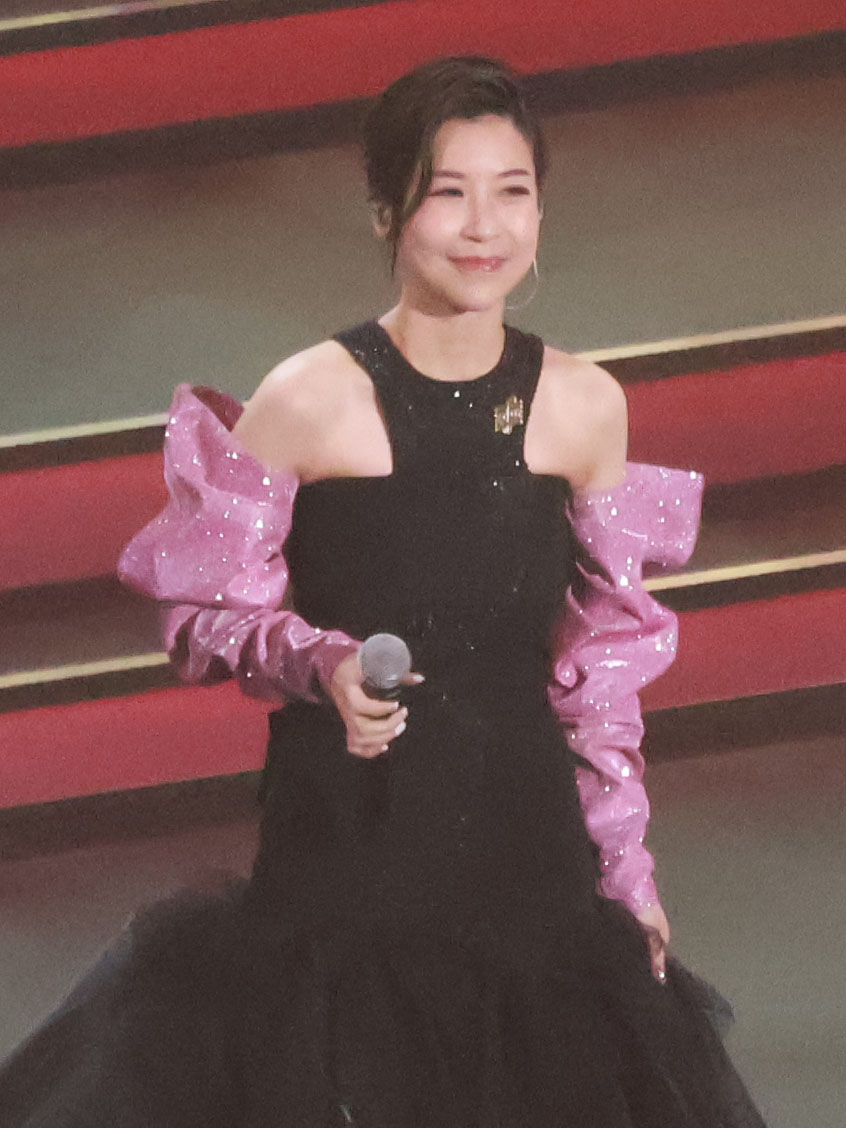

Background information
- Born: 21 April 1983 (age 43); Guangzhou, Guangdong, China
- Occupation: Singer
- Years active: 2002–present
- Label: musicNEXT
- Website: http://www.wowhififever.com/lily/

Chinese name
- Traditional Chinese: 陳潔麗
- Simplified Chinese: 陈洁丽
Transcriptions

Lily Chan (born 21 April 1983) is a Chinese singer. She was born and grew up in Guangzhou. Chan's musical talent was discovered by her choir teacher. By age 10, Chan started recording in the studio and has won numerous singing awards including Champion of the National Children's New Song Competition, the gold prize for solo song in the Guangzhou Children's Art Flower Show etc.

By age 16, she gave performances on an international tour in Beijing, Hong Kong, Macau, and Malaysia. Since making her debut, when she was just 19, she has since released ten albums, which consistently ranked among the top 10 Hi-Fi albums of the year in Hong Kong. Her on-stage elegance and her sweet, mellow voice earned her the nickname “Queen of Hi-Fi”.

== Discography ==
- Purely (CD) – 2012
- Yan Lei (CD) – 2011
- Lily Sings Teresa Live in Hong Kong (CD) – 2010
- Passion 2009 Live (CD) - 2010
- Nong Qing (CD) – 2009
- Lily Chan Hong Kong Concert Live 2007 (CD/VCD/DVD) – 2008
- The Sky And The Earth (CD) – 2007
- Lily Come Face To Face With Chris (CD) – 2006
- Sweet Words (CD) – 2005
- 1.825m (CD) – 2005
- The Beautiful Shade Of Flowers (CD) – 2004
- Song Of Love (CD) – 2004
- Each In A Different Corner Of The World - 2003
- Xin Qu (CD) - 2002

== Concert ==
- Passion – 2009
- Lily Chan Hong Kong Concert Live - 2007
