= Hell Hath No Fury (Rock Goddess album) =

Studio album by Rock Goddess
- Released: October 1983
- Recorded: August–September 1983
- Studio: Power Plant Studios (London)
- Genre: Heavy metal
- Length: 39:33
- Label: A&M
- Producer: Chris Tsangarides

Rock Goddess chronology
Rock Goddess (1983)	Hell Hath No Fury (1983)	Young and Free (1987)

Singles from Hell Hath No Fury
- 1. "I Didn't Know I Loved You (Till I Saw You Rock And Roll)" / "Hell Hath No Fury" Released: 1984

US edition cover

Professional ratings
Review scores
Source	Rating
AllMusic	4/5 stars
Collector's Guide to Heavy Metal	3/10
Kerrang!	very favorable
Metal Forces	6/10

Hell Hath No Fury was the second studio album by the English heavy metal band, Rock Goddess. All songs were again written and composed by Jody Turner. The American version was published with different cover artwork and 2 different songs, taken from the "I Didn't Know I Loved You (Till I Saw You Rock and Roll)" single, instead of songs 2 and 7 of the European edition.

== Track listings ==
Original UK Vinyl Release

All tracks are written by Jody Turner, except where indicated.

Side one
No.	Title	Length
1.	"Hold Me Down"	4:01
2.	"No More"	3:17
3.	"Gotta Let Your Hair Down"	3:20
4.	"Don't Want Your Love"	3:41
5.	"In the Night"	4:17

Side two
No.	Title	Length
6.	"The Visitors Are Here"	5:26
7.	"I've Seen It All Before"	4:18
8.	"You've Got Fire"	3:03
9.	"It Will Never Change"	4:43
10.	"God Be with You"	3:27

American release

Side one
No.	Title	Writer(s)	Length
1.	"Hell Hath No Fury"		4:05
2.	"I Didn't Know I Loved You (Till I Saw You Rock and Roll)"	Gary Glitter, Mike Leander	3:34
3.	"Gotta Let Your Hair Down"		3:20
4.	"In the Night"		4:17
5.	"Hold Me Down"		4:01

Side two
No.	Title	Length
6.	"The Visitors Are Here"	5:26
7.	"You've Got Fire"	3:03
8.	"It Will Never Change"	4:43
9.	"Don't Want Your Love"	3:41
10.	"God Be with You"	3:27

2008 US Reissue bonus tracks
No.	Title	Length
11.	"No More"	3:20
12.	"I've Seen It All Before"	4:21
13.	"Satisfied Then Crucified" (Re-Mix)	2:57
14.	"My Angel" (Re-Mix)	3:01

2010 UK Reissue Bonus Tracks
No.	Title	Length
11.	"Hell Hath No Fury"	4:08
12.	"In The Heat of the Night"	3:14
13.	"Our Love's Gone"	2:49

== Notes ==
- The American 1994 CD print Reissue features a different tracklist order as well as new tracks "Hell Hath No Fury" and the Gary Glitter cover "I Didn't Know I Loved You (Till I Saw You Rock and Roll)," which replace "No More", and "I've Seen It All Before."
- The 2008 Reissue includes the UK vinyl exclusives "No More", and "I've Seen It All Before." It also includes new remixes of the tracks "Satisfied Then Crucified" and "My Angel."

== Personnel ==
Rock Goddess

- Jody Turner – lead & rhythm guitar, lead vocals
- Julie Turner – drums, backing vocals
- Dee O'Malley – bass, bass pedals, keyboards, backing vocals

Production

- Chris Tsangarides – producer, engineer
- Andrew Warwick, Pete Brown, Vicky Harris – assistant engineers
- Ian Cooper – mastering at The Townhouse, London
- Fin Costello – photography
