= Rock Goddess (album) =

Studio album by Rock Goddess
- Released: February 1983
- Recorded: 1982
- Studio: Jackson's Studios, Rickmansworth
- Genre: Heavy metal
- Length: 34:55
- Label: A&M
- Producer: Vic Maile

Rock Goddess chronology
| Rock Goddess (1983) | Hell Hath No Fury (1984) |

Singles from Rock Goddess
- 1. "Heavy Metal Rock 'n' Roll" Released: 1982; 2. "My Angel" Released: 1983

Professional ratings
Review scores
| Source | Rating |
|---|---|
| AllMusic | 4/5 stars |
| Collector's Guide to Heavy Metal | 6/10 |
| Smash Hits | 7/10 |

Rock Goddess is the debut studio album by the English all-female heavy metal band Rock Goddess. It was originally released in February 1983, on the label A&M. It was produced by experienced sound engineer Vic Maile.

On release, the album was received favourably by the majority of music critics. Rock Goddess' most commercially successful album, it went on to peak at No. 65 on the UK Albums Chart, following the rising of the new wave of British heavy metal phenomenon. Two singles were issued from Rock Goddess: "Heavy Metal Rock 'n' Roll" and "My Angel" which peaked at No. 64 on the UK Singles Chart.

The album was re-issued in 2009 on Renaissance in the United States as a digitally remastered CD, featuring two bonus tracks.

== Track listing ==
All tracks are written by Jody Turner.

Side one
| No. | Title | Length |
|---|---|---|
| 1. | "Heartache" | 3:45 |
| 2. | "Back to You" | 1:54 |
| 3. | "The Love Lingers Still" | 2:53 |
| 4. | "To Be Betrayed" | 4:07 |
| 5. | "Take Your Love Away" | 4:00 |

Side two
| No. | Title | Length |
|---|---|---|
| 6. | "My Angel" | 3:01 |
| 7. | "Satisfied Then Crucified" | 2:56 |
| 8. | "Start Running" | 3:25 |
| 9. | "Make My Night" | 2:45 |
| 10. | "One Way Love" | 3:20 |
| 11. | "Heavy Metal Rock 'n' Roll" | 2:49 |
| Total length: | | 34:55 |

2004 Remastered Reissue Bonus Tracks
| No. | Title | Length |
|---|---|---|
| 12. | "I Didn't Know I Loved You (Till I Saw You Rock and Roll)" (Gary Glitter cover) | 3:34 |
| Total length: | | 38:29 |

2009 Remastered Reissue Bonus Tracks
| No. | Title | Length |
|---|---|---|
| 12. | "In The Heat of the Night" | 3:12 |
| 13. | "Our Love's Gone" | 2:47 |
| Total length: | | 40:54 |

== Personnel ==
Rock Goddess

- Jody Turner – lead vocals; lead and rhythm guitar
- Julie Turner – drums; backing vocals
- Tracey Lamb – bass guitar; backing vocals

Production

- Vic Maile – producer, engineer
- Fin Costello – photography
