= I Didn't Know I Loved You (Till I Saw You Rock and Roll) =

Single by Gary Glitter

from the album Glitter
- B-side: "Hard on Me"
- Released: 8 September 1972
- Genre: Glam rock
- Length: 3:19
- Label: Bell
- Songwriters: Gary Glitter; Mike Leander
- Producer: Mike Leander

Gary Glitter singles chronology
"Rock and Roll" (1972)	"I Didn't Know I Loved You (Till I Saw You Rock and Roll)" (1972)	"Do You Wanna Touch Me" (1973)

"I Didn't Know I Loved You (Till I Saw You Rock and Roll)" is a song by the English glam rock singer Gary Glitter, written by Glitter with Mike Leander and produced by Mike Leander. It was released as the second single from his debut studio album, Glitter (1972) and peaked at No. 4 on the UK Singles Chart. It was also Glitter's second and last charted record in the US, peaking at #35. Rock Goddess and Planet Patrol both recorded cover versions in 1983.

== Track listing ==
1. "I Didn't Know I Loved You (Till I Saw You Rock and Roll)" – 3:19
2. "Hard on Me" – 2:24

== Chart performance ==
Chart	Position
Australia (Kent Music Report)	27
France (IFOP)	3
Ireland (IRMA)	5
Netherlands (Dutch Top 40)	15
UK Singles Chart	4
US Billboard Hot 100	35
West Germany (GfK)	12
