= C'est la ouate =

Single by Caroline Loeb

from the album Loeb C.D.
- B-side: "And So What"
- Released: October 1986; 1987 (remix)
- Recorded: France, 1986
- Genre: New wave, pop
- Length: 3:48
- Label: Barclay
- Songwriters: Philippe Chany; Pierre Grillet; Caroline Loeb
- Producer: Philippe Chany

Caroline Loeb singles chronology
"Malibu" (1983)	"C'est la ouate" (1986)	"À quoi tu penses ?" (1987)

"C'est la ouate" is a pop song recorded by French artist Caroline Loeb. It was the first single from her album Loeb C.D. and her second single overall. It was released in late 1986 and published by Barclay editions. It became a big hit in France, Germany, Italy, Spain and Argentina where it became a top ten hit, and was covered by many artists throughout the years.

== History ==
This song, which has words of "a derisive and light genre" according to French charts expert Elia Habib, "is crossed in the field of the classics". French-born singer Amina Annabi and humorist Dominique Farrugia are among the singers who performed the background vocals. There are a 3:48 edit version, a 5:32 extended version and an instrumental version entitled "Lazy dub". The B-side of the vinyl, "And So What", is an adaptation in English-language by Caroline Loeb. The music video, directed by Philippe Gautier, shows model and painter Anh Duong among the dancers. A few months after the original release, in August 1987, the singer recorded a remixed version of her song which charted in the Netherlands, but she took the pseudonym of Carol'in.

In 1987, when French journalist Yves Mourousi asked President François Mitterrand about what songs he knew, the latter replied: "C'est la ouate". Arie Elmaleh performed a transformative show on the playback of the song in the 2003 film Chouchou by Merzak Allouache. Since 2004, French mutual MAAF uses the song as its jingle advertising, becoming French favorite ad in 2005.

== Cover versions and parodies ==
The song has been covered by many artists, including: French host Sophie Favier in 1996, Ike Therry in 1997, Star Academy 2 in 2002 (released as a promo CD single), Quaffe (Germany), Vik 20 and Elena for the compilation French Trance vol. 1 in 2003, Deldongo in 2005 and available digitally, Bamby and the dogs, Gennaro Cosmo Parlato on the album Remainders (Italy), Pornois, Biba Binoche (Belgium) and Mastercuts (U.S.) in 2006, Elio Riso, Giori (available digitally) and La Prohibida (Spain) in 2007, Quentin Mosimann on his debut album Duel, Carpacho and Yuyu in 2008.

The song was parodied by André Lamy in 1987 under the title "C'est la droite" on his album Public n°1, by Nadjim Lala in 1987 ("C'est l'kawa't") and by Parolix in 2007 (title: "C'est les maths").

== Chart performance ==
In France, "C'est la ouate" debuted at number 37 on 20 December 1986 and hit number five in its eighth week. It totaled six weeks in the top ten and 18 weeks on the chart (top 50). In Austria, it charted for two weeks at number 30 on 1 October 1987. It reached number one in Italy and number three in Spain, and number ten in Germany. According to the SACEM, the song also ranked on the Argentinian chart.

== Track listings ==
7" single

1. "C'est la ouate" – 3:48
2. "And So What" – 3:48

7" single - Remixes

1. "C'est la ouate" (remix) – 4:00
2. "Comme un papillon" – 4:18

== Certifications ==
Certifications for "C'est la ouate"
Region	Certification	Certified units/sales
France (SNEP)	Silver	250,000^{*}
^{*} Sales figures based on certification alone.

== Charts ==
=== Weekly charts ===
Weekly chart performance for "C'est la ouate"
Chart (1986–1987)	Peak position
Argentine (The Singles Chart)	10
Austria (Ö3 Austria Top 40)	30
Europe (European Hot 100)	25
Europe (European Airplay Top 50)	26
France (SNEP)	5
Italy (Musica e dischi)	3
Italy (Music & Media)	1
Italy Airplay (Music & Media)	4
Netherlands (Single Top 100) Remix version	32
Quebec (ADISQ)	25
Spain (AFYVE)	3
West Germany (The Official Charts)	10
