= Rock Goddess =

British heavy metal band

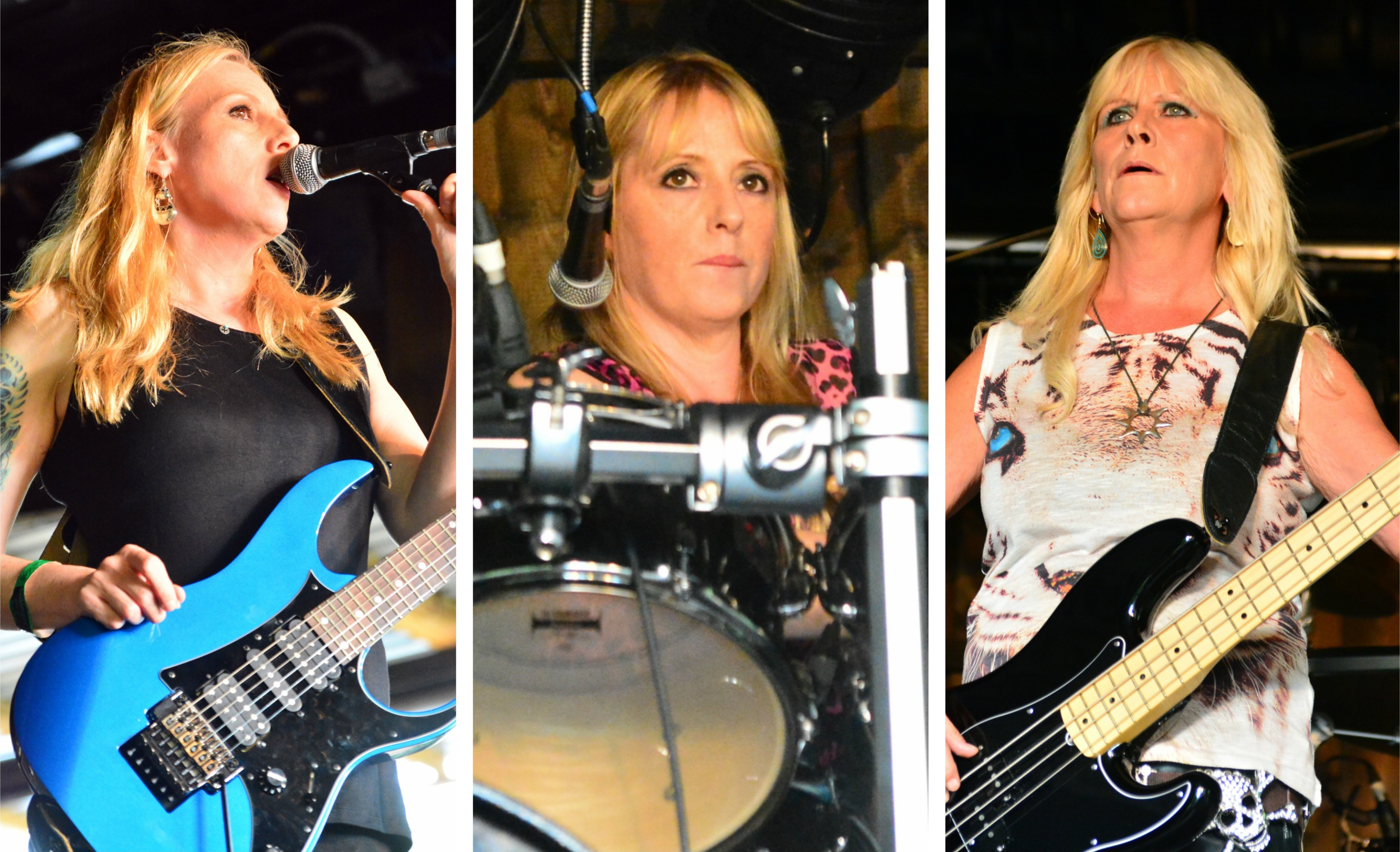
- From left to right: Jody Turner (vocals; guitar), Julie Turner (drums), Tracey Lamb (bass)

Background information
- Origin: Wandsworth, London, England
- Genre: Heavy metal
- Years active: 1977–1987; 1994–1995; 2013–2022
- Labels: A&M; JID; Thunderbolts
- Members: Jody Turner; Julie Turner; Jenny Lane
- Past members: Tracey Lamb; Dee O'Malley; Isabella Fronzoni; Aki Shibahara; Nicky Shaw

Rock Goddess were an English all-female heavy metal band formed in Wandsworth, South London, in 1977 by sisters Jody Turner and Julie Turner.

The band were initially active during the new wave of British heavy metal musical movement, releasing two singles that entered the Top 75 charts in the UK. The band had a cult following throughout the 1980s and reformed in 2013.

== History ==
The band was formed in Wandsworth, South London in 1977, by sisters Jody Turner (vocals and guitar) and Julie Turner (drums) when they were thirteen and nine years old respectively. They recruited high school friend Tracey Lamb on bass guitar and that completed their first line-up. Later Donnica Colman joined, adding a second guitar, and after her departure, Jackie Apperley replaced her, also on second guitar. After Apperley left, the band rehearsed intensively as a trio, and placed a track on a sampler album, which circulated in the London music underground. Meanwhile, their manager John Turner, Jody and Julie's father, who owned a music store and rehearsal rooms, used his musical connections to get the band their first gigs. Finally, after an appearance at the Reading Festival in 1982, the band obtained a recording contract with A&M.

They released their self-titled debut studio album with record producer Vic Maile in February 1983, and at that time there were temporary legal problems – Julie Turner was still a minor attending high school, and she was restricted in the number of live shows that she could participate in. Also during this period, Kat Burbella briefly joined the band as a second guitarist, and Tracey Lamb became disgruntled and quit the band, initially forming the band She with Burbella, but then joining Girlschool in 1987. She was replaced by Dee O'Malley, who played the bass guitar and keyboards on the band's second studio album, Hell Hath No Fury, which was produced by Chris Tsangarides and released in October 1983. The band co-headlined with Y&T, supported Iron Maiden and Def Leppard on UK and European tours, and embarked on their own headlining tours. O'Malley announced her pregnancy just before Rock Goddess' first US tour and left the band. Rock Goddess left A&M with their third album unfinished and unreleased. O'Malley was replaced by Julia Longman on bass guitar, and Becky Axten on keyboards.

In 1986, Rock Goddess provided backing vocals on Joint Forces (1986), the sixth studio album of the band Samson. Jody Turner also shared lead vocals with Samson singer Nicky Moore on the track Trump.

In 1987, their third studio album was released exclusively in France, with the title Young and Free, however, due to insurmountable problems Rock Goddess disbanded shortly thereafter. In 1988, the Turner sisters reappeared as the Jody Turner Band with two male musicians, but they did not go beyond the local club circuit. Jody Turner fronted a new line-up of Rock Goddess in 1994. After a name change to Braindance, the band disbanded again in 1995. They played their last gig at the pub Thomas O'Becket.

The band reformed in 2009 to play the Hard Rock Hell music festival in Prestatyn, Wales, but split before they had a chance to perform.

In March 2013, it was announced that the original line-up of Jody Turner, Julie Turner, and Tracey Lamb had reformed and would start recording a new album. The three of them began the process of recording a new album tentatively titled Unfinished Business.

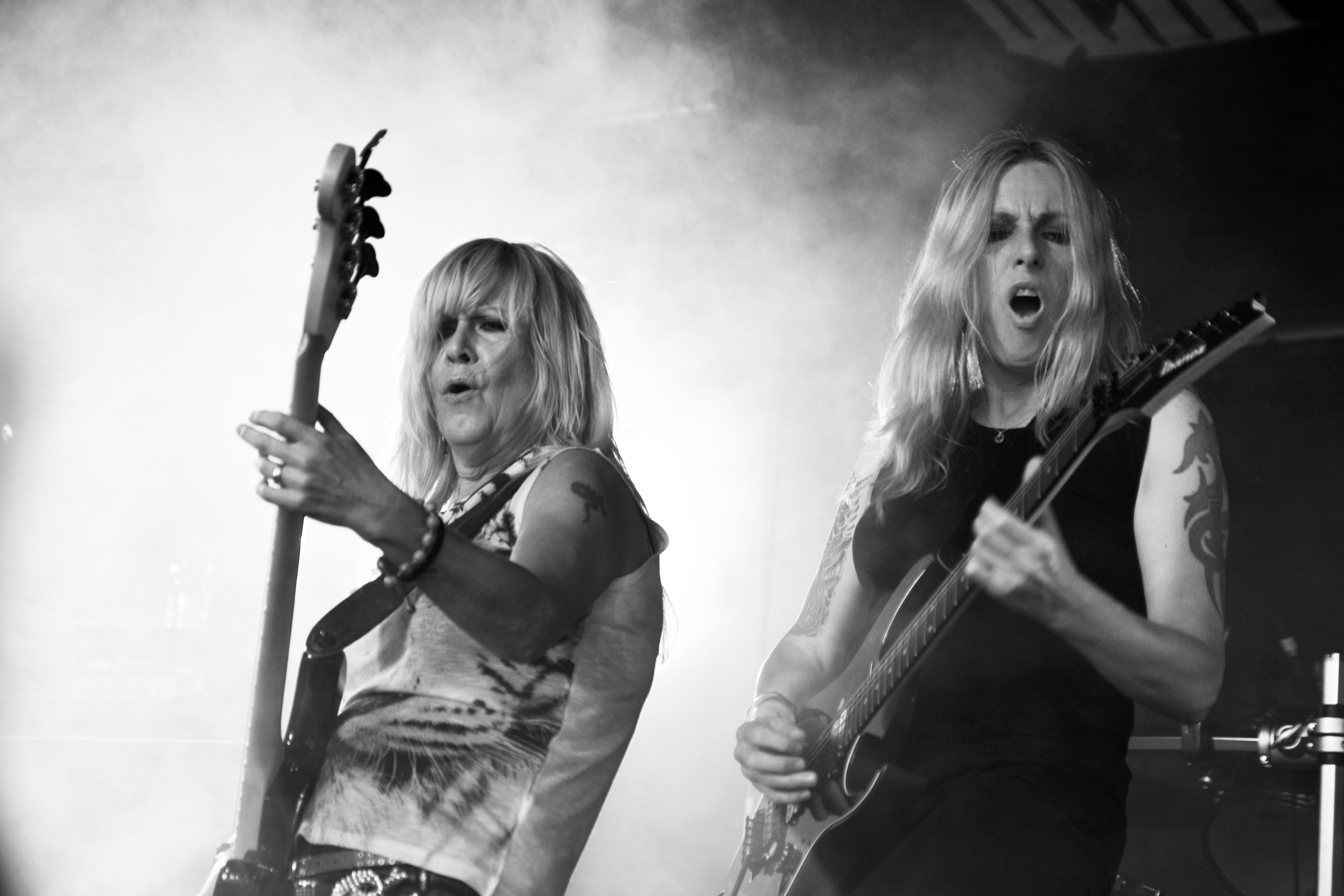
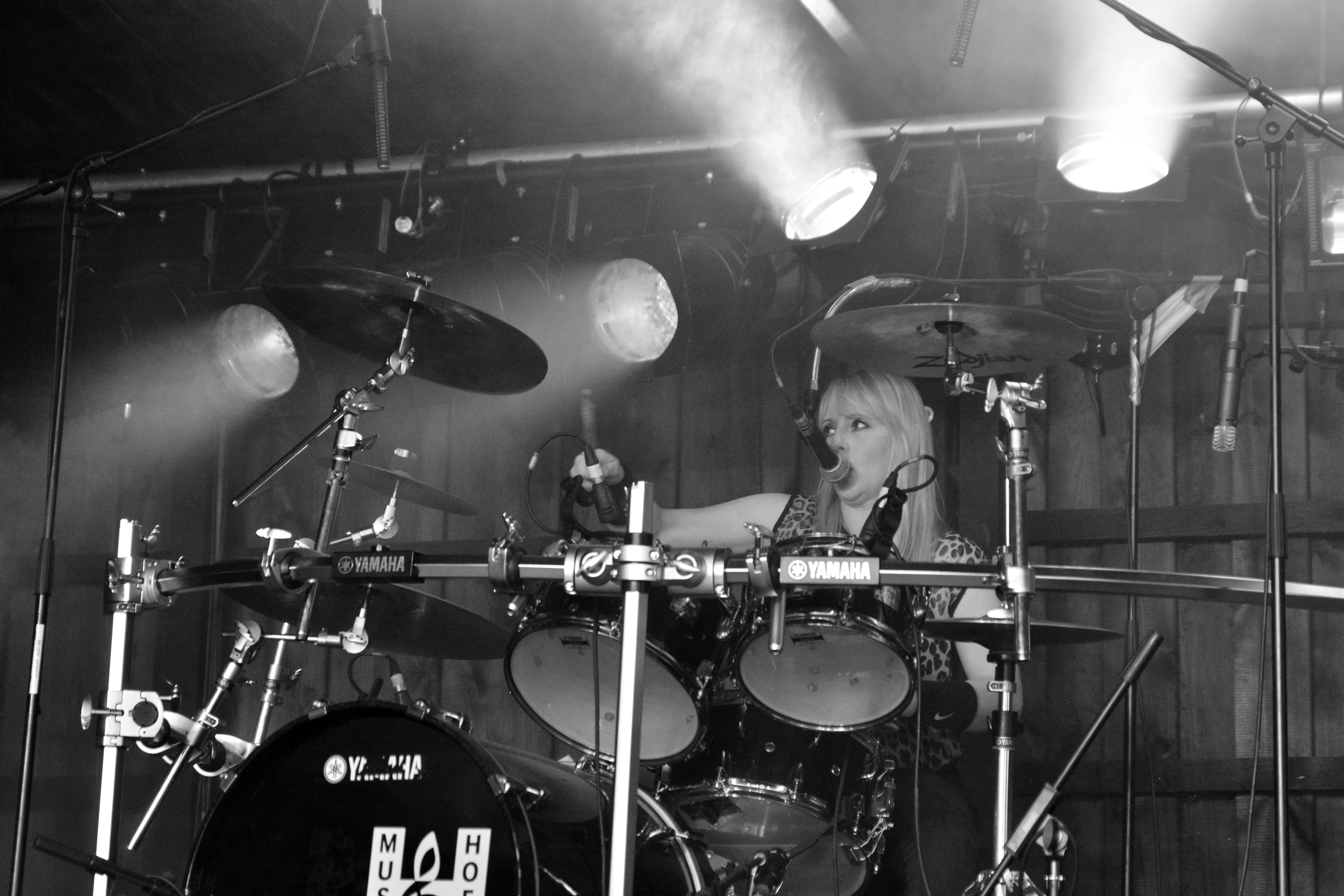
Rock Goddess at Headbangers Open Air 2015 in Germany

The album failed to appear, but in 2017 a three-track EP was announced. It's More Than Rock and Roll was released on 19 May 2017, and a video for the title track was released via Vintage TV on 21 April that year.

On 10 July 2018, it was announced that bassist Tracey Lamb had left the band. She later rejoined Girlschool in 2019 as a temporary touring member initially and then as the successor for long-time bassist Enid Williams. Jenny Lane was announced as the new bassist on 9 October 2018. The band were then set to release their comeback record This Time in October 2018, but it was delayed until 1 March 2019 where it gained a top 10 placing the UK rock/metal chart and a top 40 placing in the national indie chart.

The band announced in August 2022 that they had broken up.

== Band members ==
=== Final lineup ===
- Jody Turner – vocals, guitars (1977–1987, 1994–1995, 2013–2022)
- Julie Turner – drums (1977–1987, 2013–2022)
- Jenny Lane – bass (2019–2022)

=== Former members ===
- Tracey Lamb – bass (1977–1983, 2013–2019)
- Dee O'Malley – bass, keyboards (1983–1987)
- Aki Shibahara – bass (1994–1995)
- Nicola Shaw – drums (1994–1995)
- Isabella Fronzoni – guitars (1994–1995)

== Discography ==
Studio albums

Year	Title	Label	UK Albums Chart
1983	Rock Goddess	A&M	65
1983	Hell Hath No Fury	A&M	84
1987	Young and Free	JID	–
2019	This Time	Bite You to Death	–

EPs

Year	Title	Label	UK Albums Chart
2017	It's More Than Rock and Roll	Cargo	–

Singles

Year	Title	B-side	Album	UK Singles Chart
1982	"Heavy Metal Rock 'n' Roll"	"Satisfied Then Crucified"	Rock Goddess	–
1983	"My Angel"	"In the Heat of the Night"	Rock Goddess	64
1984	"I Didn't Know I Loved You (Till I Saw You Rock and Roll)"	"Hell Hath No Fury"	Hell Hath No Fury	57
1986	"Love Has Passed Me By"	"Jerry"	Young and Free	–

== See also ==
- List of all-female bands
- List of new wave of British heavy metal bands
