= Caroline Loeb =

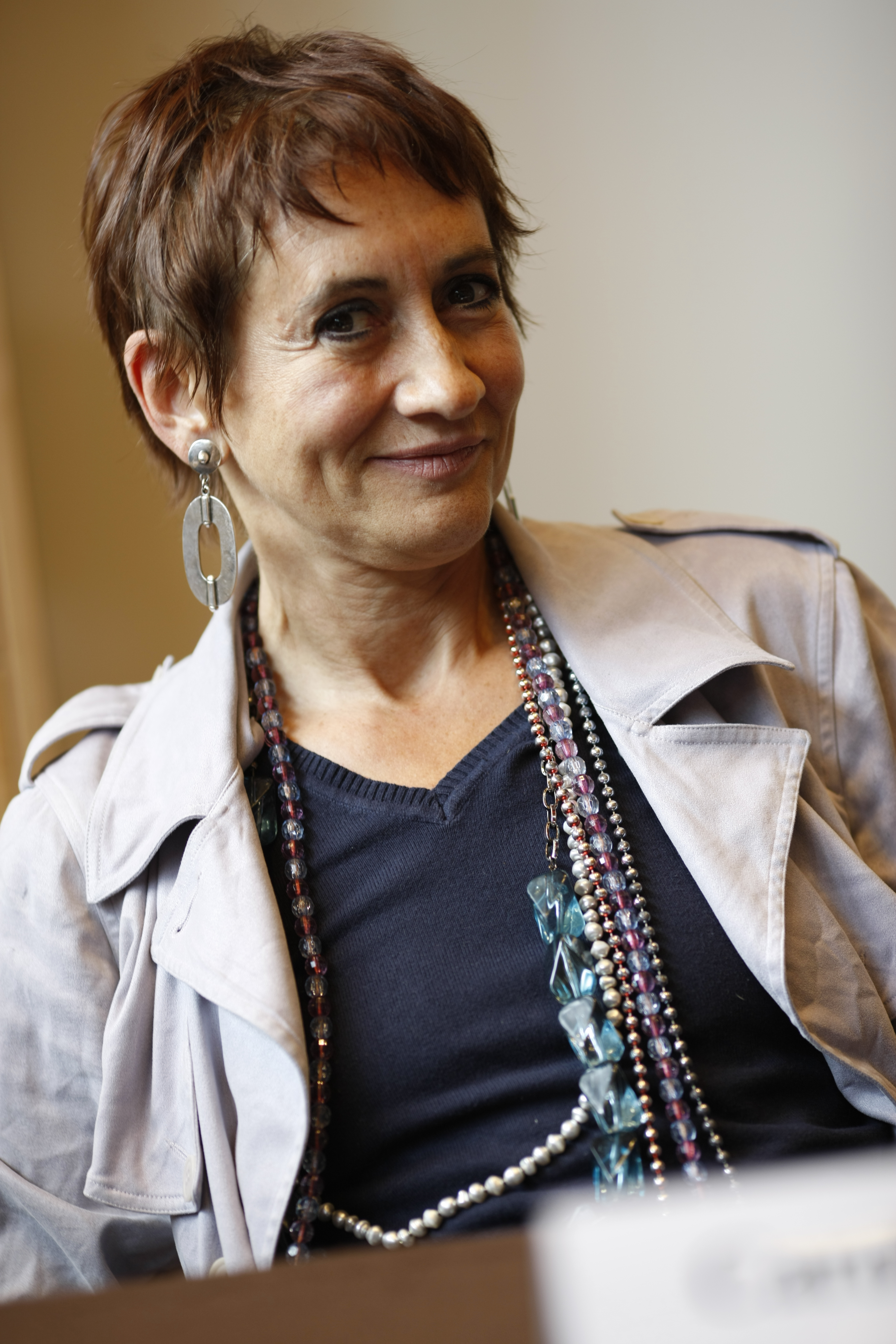
- Loeb in 2009

Background information
- Born: 5 October 1955 (age 71)
- Origin: Neuilly-sur-Seine, Hauts-de-Seine, France
- Genre: Pop
- Occupations: Singer; actress; writer; host
- Instrument: Vocals
- Years active: 1983–present
- Labels: ZE; Barclay; PolyGram; Flarenasch; On Peut; Frémeaux & Associés
- Website: https://carolineloeb.com

Caroline Loeb (born 5 October 1955) is a French actress, radio host, singer, and director. In 1986, she co-wrote and recorded the hit single "C'est la ouate". As a new wave musician, she recorded both in French and English.

== Filmography ==
- 1973 : La Maman et la Putain by Jean Eustache
- 1974 : Mes petites amoureuses by Jean Eustache
- 1978 : Dirty Dreamer by Jean-Marie Périer
- 1978 : Flammes by Adolfo Arrieta
- 1979 : Lady Oscar by Jacques Demy
- 1980 : L'Ombre d'un jeu by Uziel Peres
- 1981 : Quartet by James Ivory
- 1982 : Jimmy jazz by Laurent Perrin
- 1984 : La Nuit porte-jarretelles by Virginie Thévenet
- 1984 : Mode in France by William Klein
- 1985 : Les Nanas by Annick Lanoë
- 1987 : Cœurs croisés by Stéphanie de Mareuil
- 1991 : La Montre, la Croix et la Manière (The Favour, the Watch and the Very Big Fish) by Ben Lewin
- 1997 : Baby-sitter blues by Williams Crépin (TV)
- 2003 : Sami by Serge Moati (TV)
- 2004 : Vénus et Apollon (TV)
- 2008 : Like a Star Shining in the Night by René Féret
- 2008 : Rien dans les poches by Marion Vernoux (TV)
- 2021 : Un instant de bonheur de Raffaël Enault : La femme au feu

== Television ==
- 2008 : X Femmes, Season 1, Episode 5. Director

== Discography ==
=== Albums ===
- 1983 : Piranana (ZE Records)
- 1987 : Loeb C.D. (Barclay)
- 2004 : Best of (Choice of Music)
- 2007 : Crime parfait (8 Songs) (On Peut/Digitallmajor)
- 2009 : Crime parfait (13 songs) (On Peut/Believe)
- 2019: Comme Sagan

=== Singles ===
- 1983 : "À Malibu"
- 1986 : "C'est la ouate" / "And so What" (#1 Italy, #3 Spain, #5 France, #10 Germany, #30 Austria)
- 1987 : "À quoi tu penses?" (#27 Italy, #67 Germany)
- 1988 :" Amants zaimants"
- 1988 : "Le Telefon"
- 1988 : "Mots croisés"
- 1995 : "J'te hais dans la peau"

== Bibliography ==
- 1992 : Tallulah, darling et autres chansons, illustrated by Lolo Miegemolle, Rouleau libre, Paris
- 1992 : Saint Valentin et Rintintin, illustrated by Lolo Miegemolle, Recto Verso, Paris
- 1999 : Bon chic chroniques, Collection Points Virgule, Le Seuil, Paris (ISBN 2020188988)
- 2002 : Shirley, Shirley Goldfarb, Éditions Espaces 34, (ISBN 2907293869)
- 2006 : Has been, Roman, Flammarion, Paris (ISBN 9782080690609)
- 2015 : 'Mes années 80 de A à Z' Editions vents de sable
