= Venus and the Razorblades =

American punk rock band

- Also known as: The Razorblades
- Origin: Los Angeles, California, United States
- Genres: Punk rock, new wave
- Years active: 1976–1977
- Labels: Visa, Bomp!, Spark
- Past members: Vicki Razorblade; Steven T. Dyan Diamond; Danielle Faye; Kyle Raven; Roni Lee; Nickey Beat

Venus and the Razorblades were a short-lived punk rock band from Los Angeles, California, formed and managed by Kim Fowley after his initial separation with The Runaways in 1976. They are believed to be one of the first mixed-gender American punk bands.

Rock impresario Kim Fowley first severed ties with the Runaways in September 1976, and then reconciled with the band in November, returning to the studio to record their second album Queens of Noise. It was during this period of inactivity that Fowley assembled Venus and the Razorblades. Fowley intended the band to be a mixed-gender group in the vein of "Fleetwood Mac or ABBA," and touted the band as "Kiss and Aerosmith meet ABBA" in his initial promo for the band. The band's name was initially intended for the Runaways, but the name went unused because no one in the group could decide which member would be "Venus."

The band's lineup included guitarist/singer Roni Lee (born Rhonda Lee Ryckman); guitarist/singer Steven T. (Tetsch); bassist Danielle Faye (formerly of Atomic Kid and later The Zippers); drummer Nickey Beat (later of The Weirdos and the Germs) (soon replaced by Kyle Raven); and singers Dyan Diamond and Vicki Razorblade (born Vicki Arnold). When the band formed, Diamond and Razorblade were only 14 and 17 years old respectively.

Venus and the Razorblades played their first shows at the Starwood November 3–4. The band performed with Fowley's band The Quick at a series of shows entitled "Kim Fowley presents Punk Rock" at the Whisky a Go Go November 25–28. This was followed by a December 2 show featuring Venus and the Razorblades headlining and the band Shock opening, and a series of shows with Venus and the Razorblades opening for Van Halen December 3–5, all at the Whisky a Go Go.

In February 1977, the Runaways opted to record two of Venus and the Razorblades' songs, "Alright You Guys" and "I Wanna Be Where the Boys Are." Both songs ended up on the Runaways LP Live in Japan (1977). Cherie Currie recorded "Young and Wild" for her LP Beauty's Only Skin Deep (1977) and Van Halen recorded a demo of "Young and Wild" with producer Ted Templeman. The band also worked with Bomp Records on the release of a single entitled "Punk-a-Rama," whose B-side contained an excerpt of a press conference featuring the band, Fowley and Rodney Bingenheimer.

Island Records expressed interest in the band and brought the band into the studio to record, but opted not to release the final album upon its completion. Bob Ezrin was then brought in to produce for the band, and the group was accepted by Atlantic Records, but no final product was released.

Inner tensions led to the group disbanding in 1977. A posthumous compilation album entitled Songs from the Sunshine Jungle was released in July 1978 on Visa Records.

After Venus and the Razorblades disbanded, Fowley tried to make Dyan Diamond a star and got a deal for her with MCA Records; her 1978 album, In the Dark was a commercial failure. Roni Lee collaborated and performed with Randy California and Ed Cassidy of Spirit, as well as Mars Bonfire and Jerry Edmonton of Steppenwolf, in 1977-78. In 2004 a follow-up album release on CD, "More Songs From The Sunshine Jungle" was issued on Charlatan Records. In 2013, Lee was granted an endorsement with Paul Reed Smith guitars for her distinctive style of playing as well as her place in punk rock's early history. Lee released the album Heros of Sunset Blvd. in 2016.

The Woman's International Music Network, founded by Laura B. Whitmore, gives credit to Venus and the Razorblades, as well as the Runaways, for performing in a genre that was dominated mostly by men.
