= Cherry Bomb (Runaways song) =

Single by the Runaways

from the album The Runaways
- B-side: "Blackmail"
- Released: June 1976: September 1976 (France, Spain) September 17, 1976 (UK, Australia) October 5, 1976 (Japan)
- Recorded: March 1976
- Studio: Fidelity Recorders (Studio City)
- Genre: Hard rock • heavy metal
- Length: 2:20
- Label: Mercury
- Songwriters: Joan Jett; Kim Fowley
- Producer: Kim Fowley

The Runaways singles chronology
"Cherry Bomb" (1976)	"Heartbeat" (1977)

Music video
- Video on YouTube

Professional ratings
Review scores
Source	Rating
Billboard	no rating
Cashbox	no rating
Record World	no rating
Record Mirror	no rating

"Cherry Bomb" is the debut single by the rock band the Runaways from their first album The Runaways, released in June 1976, through Mercury. "Cherry Bomb" was ranked 52nd on VH1's 100 Greatest Hard Rock Songs and peaked at number 6 on the Billboard Bubbling Under Hot 100 chart.

== About the song ==
Joan Jett composed the song with Kim Fowley, the band's then-manager. In the documentary Edgeplay: A Film About the Runaways (2005), Fowley and former Runaways lead singer Cherie Currie claimed that "Cherry Bomb" was quickly written just for Currie to audition for the band because the band members could not perform the song she originally chose to sing.

The song was included in the soundtrack of the made-for-TV movie: Dawn: Portrait of a Teenage Runaway starring Eve Plumb, in 1976. The song was also included in the film Dazed and Confused (1993), the 16th episode of season 4 of Warehouse 13 with guest appearance by Currie (2013), the film Guardians of the Galaxy (2014), in the second episode of the Amazon Prime series The Boys (2019), in the seventh episode of the FX/Hulu miniseries Mrs. America (2020), in the Netflix film Fear Street Part Two: 1978 (2021), and the 7th episode of the 2nd season of Netflix’s Heartbreak High (2024).

Jett re-recorded the song with her band the Blackhearts for the album Glorious Results of a Misspent Youth (1984); this version charted on the Billboard Dance Club Songs chart, peaking at number 55. Cherie Currie also re-recorded "Cherry Bomb" with Marie Currie, her twin sister, on their 1997 re-released version of the album Messin' with the Boys (1980).

== Tracklist ==
Side A
No.	Title	Writer(s)	Lead vocals by	Length
1.	"Cherry Bomb"	Joan Jett, Kim Fowley	Cherie Currie	2:20

Side B
No.	Title	Writer(s)	Lead vocals by	Length
2.	"Blackmail"	Jett	Jett	2:40
Total length:				5:00

== Personnel ==
The Runaways

- Cherie Currie — vocals
- Lita Ford — lead guitar
- Joan Jett — rhythm guitar, vocals
- Jackie Fox — bass (not performed)
- Sandy West — drums

Session musician

- Nigel Harrison — bass (uncredited)

== Charts ==
Chart (1976)	Peak position
Australia (Kent Music Report)	57
US Billboard Bubbling Under Hot 100	106

== Certifications ==
Region	Certification	Certified units/sales
United Kingdom (BPI)	Silver	200,000^{‡}
^{‡} Sales+streaming figures based on certification alone.
