= Flaming Schoolgirls =

Compilation album by the Runaways
- Released: 1980 (U.K.)
- Recorded: 1977
- Genres: Hard rock; punk rock
- Length: 34:47
- Label: Cherry Red
- Producers: Kim Fowley; Earle Mankey; Kent J. Smythe; the Runaways

The Runaways chronology
And Now... The Runaways (1979)	Flaming Schoolgirls (1980)	Little Lost Girls (1981)

Professional ratings
Review scores
Source	Rating
AllMusic	4/5 stars
Spin Alternative Record Guide	4/10

Flaming Schoolgirls is an album by the rock band the Runaways. It was released in 1980, a year after the band had broken up as Kim Fowley believed he would make money due to the fact that Cherie Currie was starring in the film Foxes. A compilation of previously unreleased recordings, the album consists of one alternate version and three unreleased tracks from the sessions for the 1977 album Queens of Noise, five live tracks left over and a studio recording of a song from the 1977 album Live in Japan, and two Cherie Currie demo recordings. The album was not released in the U.S.

== Track listing ==
Side A
No.	Title	Writer(s)	Length
1.	"Intro" (live)		0:21
2.	"Strawberry Fields" (The Beatles cover from Cherie Currie demo)	Lennon–McCartney	3:19
3.	"C'mon"	Joan Jett	3:58
4.	"Hollywood Cruisin" (alternate version of "Hollywood")	Jett; Jackie Fox; Kim Fowley	2:42
5.	"Blackmail" (live)	Jett; Fowley	2:47
6.	"Is It Day or Night?" (live)	Fowley	2:32

Side B
No.	Title	Writer(s)	Length
7.	""Here Comes the Sun" (The Beatles cover from Cherie Currie demo)	George Harrison	3:02
8.	"Hollywood Dream"	Fowley; Steven T.	3:53
9.	"Don't Abuse Me"	Jett	3:27
10.	"I Love Playin' with Fire" (live)	Jett	3:47
11.	"Secrets" (live)	Cherie Currie; Fowley; Sandy West; Kari Krome	3:15
Total length:			34:47

== Personnel ==
The Runaways

- Cherie Currie – lead vocals, keyboards
- Joan Jett – rhythm guitar, vocals
- Lita Ford – lead guitar, backing vocals
- Jackie Fox – bass, backing vocals
- Sandy West – drums, backing vocals

Production

- Kim Fowley – producer of Cherie Currie demo and all studio outtakes
- Earle Mankey – producer of studio outtakes
- Kent J. Smythe – producer with The Runaways of live outtakes
- Alan Wilson – mastering
- Alex Blades – re-issue coordination
- Niva Bringas – liner notes, photography
