= The Runaways (album) =

Studio album by the Runaways
- Released: May 17, 1976: April 27, 1976 (test pressing) April 29, 1976 (acetate-disc) 25 October 1976 (Japan) November 1976 (UK) 2003 (reissue)
- Recorded: March 1976
- Studios: Fidelity Recorders (Studio City); Criterion Studios (Hollywood)
- Genres: Hard rock; punk rock; heavy metal
- Length: 32:04
- Labels: Mercury; Cherry Red (2003 reissue)
- Producer: Kim Fowley

The Runaways chronology
The Runaways (1976)	Queens of Noise (1977)

Singles from The Runaways
- 1. "Cherry Bomb" Released: June 1976 September 1976 (France, Spain) September 17, 1976 (UK, Australia) October 1976 (Japan); 2. "Secrets" Released: November 25, 1976 (Japan)

The Runaways is the debut studio album by the American rock band the Runaways, released on May 17, 1976, through Mercury.

== Background ==
According to multiple sources, including Cherie Currie in her memoir Neon Angel, the liner notes of the 2003 Cherry Red Records reissue of The Runaways, and Jackie Fox herself, bassist Nigel Harrison played bass on the album because manager Kim Fowley refused to let Fox play.

The documentary film Edgeplay: A Film About the Runaways states that the album's first track, "Cherry Bomb", was written ad hoc during lead singer Cherie Currie's audition, and that the title is a play on the pronunciation of Currie's first name. Currie had been told to prepare a Suzi Quatro song for the audition; she chose "Fever", a song the band did not know how to play. Instead, Jett and Fowley came up with "Cherry Bomb" and had Currie perform it during the audition.

On January 5, 2009, "Cherry Bomb" was ranked 52nd on VH1's 100 Greatest Hard Rock Songs list. A cover of "Cherry Bomb" was featured in the music video game Rock Band as a downloadable single track. The song has also appeared in the films Dazed and Confused, RV, Cherrybomb, The Runaways, and Guardians of the Galaxy, and is played in the opening scene of Margaret Cho's stand-up comedy DVD I'm the One That I Want.

"You Drive Me Wild" is featured in the 2010 film about the band. Actress Dakota Fanning performs "Cherry Bomb" as well as "Dead End Justice" with Kristen Stewart, as they portray Cherie Currie and Joan Jett, respectively.

== Music ratings ==
Professional ratings
Review scores
Source	Rating
AllMusic	4.5/5 stars
Billboard	no rating
Record World	no rating
Phonograph Record	no rating
Cashbox	no rating
New Musical Express	no rating
Crawdaddy!	no rating
Creem	no rating
RPM	no rating
Stereo Review	no rating

AllMusic praised the album (especially band members Cherie Currie, Joan Jett and Lita Ford), comparing the music to material by Led Zeppelin and Aerosmith.

== Track listing ==
Credits adapted from the liner notes of test pressing and original LP.

LP (Mercury Records – catalogue number: SRM-1-1090) Side one
No.	Title	Writer(s)	Lead vocals by	Length
1.	"Cherry Bomb"	Joan Jett; Kim Fowley	Cherie Currie	2:20
2.	"You Drive Me Wild"	Jett	Jett	3:20
3.	"Is It Day or Night?"	Fowley	Currie	2:43
4.	"Thunder"	Mark Anthony; Kari Krome	Currie and Jett (scat-vocals)	2:35
5.	"Rock and Roll"	Lou Reed	Jett	3:14

Side two
No.	Title	Writer(s)	Lead vocals by	Length
1.	"Lovers"	Jett; Fowley	Jett and Currie (scat-vocals)	2:10
2.	"American Nights"	Anthony; Fowley	Currie	3:15
3.	"Blackmail"	Jett; Fowley	Jett	2:40
4.	"Secrets"	Currie; Fowley; Krome; Sandy West	Currie	2:47
5.	"Dead End Justice"	Scott Anderson; Currie; Fowley; Jett	Currie and Jett	7:00
Total length:				32:04

== Personnel ==
Credits adapted from the liner notes of original LP.

The Runaways

- Cherie Currie — vocals and piano (tracks 4, 7, 9)
- Lita Ford — lead guitar
- Joan Jett — rhythm guitar and vocals
- Jackie Fox — bass and vocals (not performed)
- Sandy West — drums and vocals

Session musicians

- The Runaways, Kim Fowley, Scott Anderson — arrangements
- Rodney Bingenheimer — orchestration (outro; track 10)

Technical

- Kim Fowley — production, direction
- Andy Morris — sound
- Scott Anderson — production coordination
- Gilbert Kong — mastering
- Bill Jimmerson — recording
- Lawrence W. Wendelken — recording
- Tom Gold — photography
- Recorded at Fidelity Recorders, Studio City in March 1976

Mixed at Criterion Studios, Hollywood in April

2003 reissue

- Nigel Harrison — bass
- Andy Morris — sound engineer
- Мickey Steele — engineer
- Alex Blades —production process coordinator
- Bill Jimmerson — recording operator
- Lawrence W. Wendelken — recording
- Desmond Strobel — designer
- Michael Hausman, Niva Bringas — photographers
- Ian McNei, Joan Jett, Michael Heatley, Lisa Francher, Sally O-Jay — text booklet authors

== Charts ==
Year	Chart	Peak position
1976	US Billboard 200	194
1976	Australia (Kent Music Report)	31

== Sources ==
- "Runaway Girls". Melody Maker. Vol. 51, no. 29. London: IPC Magazines Ltd. July 17, 1976. p. 18. ISSN 0025-9012.
- Michael Barackman (August 10, 1976). "Runaways: Teenaged, Wild & Braless". Circus. No. 137. New York: Circus Enterprises Corporation. p. 16. ISSN 0009-7365.
- David Brown (October 2, 1976). "Running Wild!" (PDF). Record Mirror. London: Spotlight Publications Ltd. p. 6. ISSN 0144-5804. Archived from the original (PDF) on May 20, 2024.
- Harry Doherty (October 16, 1976). "The Runaways: You Sexy Things!". Melody Maker. Vol. 51, no. 42. London: IPC Magazines Ltd. p. 13. ISSN 0025-9012.
- Charles M. Young (October 1976). "?". Crawdaddy! (10 ed.). New York: Crawdaddy Publishing Co. p. 1, 34–35. ISSN 0011-0833.
