= Rock Hard: 1977 =

2024 music-themed board game

- Publishers: Devir Games
- Publication: August 7, 2024; 2 years ago
- Genres: Board game
- Players: 2–5
- Chance: Medium
- Age range: 16+
- Website: devirgames.com/rock-hard

Rock Hard: 1977 is a board game created by the former Runaways bassist Jackie Fuchs and published by Devir Games. In the game, players attempt to become a successful rock star in America in 1977.

The game, fully released on August 7, 2024, following a successful Gen Con debut, was listed in Smithsonian's best board games of 2024.

== Gameplay ==
The game is designed for two to five players of 16 years of age or over. The gameplay of Rock Hard is generally randomized, with some strategy, and players are tasked with making a story of the erratic progress of their character. Players act as aspiring rock stars in 1977 and are given a limited amount of time to become such a musician. They may play as ten different characters. They each have personal player boards, designed like amplifiers, which feature knobs displaying variable "chops", "songs", and "reputation" stats, all of which go up to 11. Players start with all of these knobs at 2, as well as with one in-game dollar. They also start with a day job which requires their presence three times in a round. The game operates over nine quick rounds, representing one day in each month from April to December. Each round consists of a morning, evening and after hours phase, in which each player can usually do one action per phase, with a potential for bonus actions. Players may also skip their after hours phase in order to go first in the next round. Most actions increase the players' stats based on money and minimum stat requirements. The players may quit their jobs at the right time to spend more time in the studio. They may also rehearse, hire publicists, record demo tapes, obtain record deals and play concerts of varying size from bar mitzvahs to arena stages. They can also hook up with a fan backstage. All the cards have flavor text. Specific cards that can be pulled include being called a derogatory term or being at a frat party of "leering, jeering drunk guys".

A "candy" mechanic, which the players in the game take to receive a "sugar rush," allows for extra actions on top of the 27 total base actions. Players receive candy through their actions. Each time they use it, they take a card from the sugar rush deck and increase a "cravings" dial. If a die roll is higher than this craving level then they "crash", and must "recover" by skipping their day action.

In an expansion for the game, a player can play as Jackie Fox herself.

== Development ==
Fuchs initially created a prototype of Rock Hard during the COVID-19 lockdowns in 2020, playing the game alone hundreds of times. She wrote a designer diary while developing the game. The game took significant inspiration from Fuchs' own time in the music industry, though is not purely autobiographical. It is noted as a less common example of "top-down" game design, in which the rules of the game are written in service of its theme, rather than the more common opposite.

While the 1970s rock music industry was generally dominated by white, male stars, Fuchs designed the game to include men, women and androgynous characters, as well as people of multiple racial backgrounds.

She intended for the game to have a "hint" of the "darker side" of the music industry, "without really exploring" it. She has said that the "candy" mechanic was originally a direct reference to cocaine, but that she later changed this to "candy" to metaphorically encompass all the vices, such as gambling, sex addiction, or the need for attention. She has said that she was always sober during her own time in the music industry, and that her own "candy" was peanut butter cups, but that during the game's development she tried to fully understand addiction.

Fuchs pitched the game to Devir Games through the publisher's customer service email, which managing director Matt Hyland picked up. Flavor text for the cards was requested by Devir close to the deadline for the game, meaning that Fuchs ended up adding these parts from her own experiences. The game was previewed at Gen Con in 2024, advertised with a mock stage. Devir Games sold out of the 600 units prepared for the show. It was released on August 7 that year.

== Reception ==
The game sold out at games convention Gen Con on its first day. Keith Law of Paste listed Rock Hard as the best game he saw at Gen Con, later writing he had "never seen a game like it", though had "minor nitpicks" about icon choices including the "color dependency" of some of the icons that show what players should pay, which could cause problems for those with visual impairments. Rock Hard was listed in Smithsonian's best board games of 2024, calling it "a charming game, full of quirks and in-jokes, about the highs and lows of the creative process."
