= Sandy West =

American rock musician (1959–2006)

- West in 1976

Background information
- Born: Sandra Sue Pesavento; July 10, 1959; Long Beach, California, U.S.
- Died: October 21, 2006 (aged 47) San Dimas, California, U.S.
- Occupations: Musician; songwriter
- Instruments: Drums; vocals
- Years active: 1972–2006
- Formerly of: The Runaways; The Sandy West Band

Sandra Sue Pesavento, known professionally as Sandy West (July 10, 1959 – October 21, 2006) was an American singer, drummer and songwriter. She was one of the founding members of the Runaways, a teenage all-girl rock band that achieved success in the 1970s.

== Early life ==
West was born in Long Beach, California. When she was 9 years old, her grandfather bought her a drum kit, and being an avid fan of rock and roll acts of the 1960s and 1970s, she began practicing rock music immediately and regularly. From 4th through to 6th grade, she was the drummer in the Prisk Elementary School orchestra. She proved to have a natural talent and quickly became a proficient drummer. By the age of 13, she was the sole girl member of local bands who played at teenage parties. West attended Edison High school in Huntington Beach, California.

At 15, she met Joan Jett and producer Kim Fowley, who co-created and formed the Runaways.

== Career ==
=== The Runaways ===
Driven by her ambition to play professionally, she sought out fellow musicians and other industry contacts in southern California with the idea of forming an all-girl band. At a teen dance club in 1975 she met producer Kim Fowley, who gave her the phone number of another young musician in the area, guitarist Joan Jett. Jett and West met shortly thereafter. The two women subsequently played for Fowley, who agreed to help them find other female musicians to round out the band, most notably Lita Ford and Cherie Currie.

In her 2010 autobiography, Currie recalled, "Sandy was the muscle of the group; she was the rock, strong and passionate, always smiling and joking. Sandy got along with everyone and was never afraid to show her emotions. She could be tough, like the time she threw me over a car to stop my arguing with Kim, but then she'd always feel terrible after getting in your face. She was no-nonsense, with a heart of gold, and if you couldn't deal with that, then you couldn't deal with Sandy."

=== Post-Runaways years ===
After four years of recording and touring the world, the Runaways disbanded in April 1979. West made varied attempts to continue her career as a professional musician, playing with other acts in southern California, releasing a solo EP, The Beat is Back, and forming the Sandy West Band. None of these ventures produced significant income, so West was forced to spend most of her post-Runaways years working outside music. West later claimed that Fowley had not paid the members of the band what they were entitled to. "I owe him my introduction to the music business but he's also the reason I'm broke now," West said.

West appeared in Edgeplay: A Film About the Runaways (2004), a documentary about the Runaways produced and directed by the band's former bassist Victory Tischler-Blue, providing some of the more poignant interview segments, describing the things she had to do post-Runaways for money. She worked mostly in construction, and spent a small amount of time as a bartender and a veterinary assistant. In other parts of the Edgeplay interviews, she alludes to having engaged in criminal activity in order to make ends meet (e.g., she describes how she had to break someone's arm for money they owed). West spent time in jail on multiple occasions following her career in the Runaways, which she alluded to in Edgeplay.

== Personal life and death ==
Bandmate Lita Ford claimed that West and the other members of the band "were all gay [...] except Jackie". West never married and had no children.

In 2005, West was diagnosed with type C, small-cell lung cancer. She died on October 21, 2006, at the age of 47. For years, West had wanted a Runaways reunion and to play with the band again; however, she did not live long enough to see it to fruition. Currie: "The Runaways, in all its glory, would forever be missing the true heart of the band. Sandy West was one of the greatest drummers of all time. The loss of Sandy was indescribable and heart-wrenching, and there was nothing we could do about it."

On December 9, 2006, a memorial tribute concert for West was held in Los Angeles, featuring the Sandy West Band, Cherie Currie, the Bangles, the Donnas, and Carmine and Vinny Appice, among several others.

== Legacy ==
Time Magazine described West as a "pioneering rock drummer".

In 2009, a memorial monument dedicated to West - a mermaid playing the guitar with a plaque - was installed at Kenny's Music Store (24731 La Plaza) in Dana Point, California.

West was portrayed by actress Stella Maeve in the 2010 film The Runaways. The film also featured Kristen Stewart, Dakota Fanning, and Scout Taylor-Compton, who portrayed Joan Jett, Cherie Currie, and Lita Ford, respectively. During the audio commentary on the DVD extras, Jett dedicated the film to her.

== Discography ==
Runaways albums

- The Runaways (1976)
- Queens of Noise (1977)
- Live in Japan (1977)
- Waitin' for the Night (1977)
- And Now... The Runaways (international release title) (1978)
- Flaming Schoolgirls ("odds-and-sods" compilation) (1980)
- Little Lost Girls (re-sequenced U.S. version of And Now... The Runaways), (1981)
- Born to be Bad (early demos compilation) (1993)
- 20th Century Masters – The Millennium Collection: The Best of The Runaways (1999)

Post-Runaways releases

- 7" – F-13
- 4 song tape
- The Beat is Back
