= And Now... The Runaways =

Studio album by The Runaways
- Released: November 1978
- Recorded: September 1978
- Studio: Rusk Sound (Hollywood)
- Genre: Glam punk
- Length: 35:37
- Labels: Mercury (Europe); Cherry Red (UK)
- Producer: John Alcock

The Runaways chronology
Waitin' for the Night (1977)	And Now... The Runaways (1978)	Flaming Schoolgirls (1980)

Singles from And Now... The Runaways
- 1. "Right Now" / "Black Leather" Released: 1979

Little Lost Girls cover

Professional ratings
Review scores
Source	Rating
AllMusic	3/5 stars

And Now... The Runaways is the fourth and final studio album by American rock band The Runaways, released in Europe in November 1978, and in Japan and the UK in 1979.

== Background ==
This was The Runaways' last album before disbanding. The album was issued by Cherry Red Records in the UK. Mercury Records handled European distribution. It was not released in the United States until 1981 when Rhino Records re-issued it as a picture disc and a cassette tape under the title Little Lost Girls, with a different cover photo and a different sequence of the songs.

At the beginning of the recording sessions, Vicki Blue left the band and the bass lines on the tracks are actually played by Lita Ford. During the tumultuous recording of the album, manager Toby B. Mamis observed producer John Alcock's attempts to ultimately phase Joan Jett out of the proceedings, hence Sandy West and Lita Ford's individual solo spots (Sandy's with "Right Now", which she wrote and sang lead on, and Lita's "I'm a Million", featuring Ford's very first lead vocal on record). Joan later quipped, "I had a funny feeling I was about to get fired from a band that I helped create." Duane Hitchings is thanked in the credits for his work on keyboards.

"Black Leather" is a song originally written by ex-Sex Pistols members Steve Jones and Paul Cook for their former band.

Soon after hiring new bassist Laurie McAllister, Jett and Ford jointly dissolved the Runaways, citing musical differences within the group. Ford and West then attempted to start a new, harder band with Alcock producing, but nothing became of these sessions.

== Track listing ==
=== And Now... The Runaways ===
Side one
No.	Title	Writer(s)	Length
1.	"Saturday Night Special"	Earl Slick, Tonio K	3:39
2.	"Eight Days a Week"	John Lennon, Paul McCartney	3:33
3.	"Mama Weer All Crazee Now"	Noddy Holder, Jim Lea	3:26
4.	"I'm a Million"	Lita Ford	6:02

Side two
No.	Title	Writer(s)	Length
5.	"Right Now"	Sandy West	3:35
6.	"Takeover"	Joan Jett	3:11
7.	"My Buddy and Me"	Joan Jett	3:39
8.	"Little Lost Girls"	Lita Ford	4:45
9.	"Black Leather"	Steve Jones, Paul Cook	3:47
Total length:			35:37

=== Little Lost Girls ===
Side one
No.	Title	Length
1.	"Right Now"	3:35
2.	"Mama Weer All Crazee Now"	3:26
3.	"Saturday Night Special"	3:39
4.	"Eight Days a Week"	3:33
5.	"Takeover"	3:11

Side two
No.	Title	Length
6.	"Black Leather"	3:47
7.	"My Buddy and Me"	3:39
8.	"Little Lost Girls"	4:45
9.	"I'm a Million"	6:02
Total length:		35:37

== Personnel ==
The Runaways

- Joan Jett - rhythm guitar, lead and backing vocals
- Lita Ford - lead guitar, all bass, backing vocals, lead vocals on "I'm a Million"
- Sandy West - drums, backing vocals, lead vocals on "Right Now"
- Vicki Blue - bass, backing vocals (credit only, did not perform on the record)

Production

- John Alcock - producer
- Will Reid Dick - engineer
- A. Wally - assistant engineer
- Ken Perry - mastering at Capitol Studios, Hollywood, California
- David Larkham - sleeve design and direction
- Barry Levine - photography
