= Live in Japan (The Runaways album) =

Live album by The Runaways
- Released: 13 August 1977
- Recorded: 5, 6, 12 June 1977
- Venues: Tokyo Koseinenkin Kaikan, Shibuya Kokaido
- Studio: Onkio-Haus-Studio
- Genre: Hard rock
- Length: 41:44
- Label: Mercury
- Producers: Kent J. Smythe, The Runaways

The Runaways chronology
Queens of Noise (1977)	Live in Japan (1977)	Waitin' for the Night (1977)

Professional ratings
Review scores
Source	Rating
AllMusic	2/5 stars
Sounds	5/5 stars

Live in Japan is a live album from American rock band The Runaways, released on 13 August 1977. The album was originally released only in Japan (their only major fan base), and some other regions including Canada, Australia, New Zealand and the Netherlands. It was the last Runaways album that Cherie Currie and Jackie Fox appeared on and was not intended for release in the United States or the United Kingdom.

== Track listing ==
Side A
No.	Title	Writer(s)	Lead vocals by	Length
1.	"Queens of Noise"	Billy Bizeau	Cherie Currie and Joan Jett	3:19
2.	"California Paradise"	Kim Fowley, Jett, Kari Krome, Sandy West	Currie	2:57
3.	"All Right You Guys"	Danielle Fay, Bob Willingham	Currie {Joan Jett harmony vocals}	3:34
4.	"Wild Thing"	Chip Taylor	West	3:45
5.	"Gettin' Hot"	Jackie Fox, Lita Ford	Currie	4:10
6.	"Rock & Roll"	Lou Reed	Currie and Jett	3:38

Side B
No.	Title	Writer(s)	Lead vocals by	Length
7.	"You Drive Me Wild"	Jett	Jett	3:15
8.	"Neon Angels on the Road to Ruin"	Ford, Fowley, Fox	Currie	3:46
9.	"I Wanna Be Where the Boys Are"	Kim Fowley, Roni Lee	Jett	2:50
10.	"Cherry Bomb"	Jett, Fowley	Currie	2:12
11.	"American Nights"	Mark Anthony, Fowley	Currie	4:04
12.	"C'mon"	Jett	Currie	4:14
Total length:				41:44

== Personnel ==
The Runaways

- Cherie Currie – lead vocals
- Joan Jett – rhythm guitar, lead vocals
- Lita Ford – lead guitar, backing vocals
- Jackie Fox – bass, backing vocals
- Sandy West – drums, backing vocals, lead vocals on "Wild Thing"

== Charts ==
Chart (1977)	Peak position
Swedish Albums (Sverigetopplistan)	33
