= The Runaways (2010 film) =

2010 film by Floria Sigismondi

- Theatrical release poster
- Directed by: Floria Sigismondi
- Screenplay by: Floria Sigismondi
- Based on: Neon Angel: A Memoir of a Runaway (1989) by Cherie Currie
- Produced by: John Linson; Art Linson; Bill Pohlad
- Starring: Dakota Fanning; Kristen Stewart; Michael Shannon
- Cinematography: Benoît Debie
- Edited by: Richard Chew
- Music by: Lillian Berlin
- Production companies: River Road Entertainment; Linson Entertainment
- Distributed by: Apparition (United States); Summit Entertainment (international)
- Release dates: January 24, 2010 (Sundance); March 19, 2010 (United States)
- Running time: 106 minutes
- Country: United States
- Language: English
- Budget: $10 million
- Box office: $4.6 million

The Runaways is a 2010 American biographical drama film about the 1970s rock band of the same name written and directed by Floria Sigismondi in her screenwriting and feature directional debut. It is based on the book Neon Angel: A Memoir of a Runaway (1989) by the band's lead vocalist Cherie Currie. The film stars Dakota Fanning as Currie, Kristen Stewart as rhythm guitarist and vocalist Joan Jett, and Michael Shannon as record producer Kim Fowley. The Runaways depicts the formation of the band in 1975 and focuses on the relationship between Currie and Jett until Currie's departure from the band. The film grossed around $4.6 million worldwide and received generally favorable reviews from critics.

== Plot ==
Cherie Currie is a teenager in Los Angeles who desperately wants to be a rock star. She idolizes David Bowie and cuts her hair and does make-up so she will resemble Bowie's character Aladdin Sane. At her high school talent show, she lip syncs to "Lady Grinning Soul" and wins, despite some hecklers in the audience.

Joan Jett is a teenager who also dreams of rock stardom. At a club one night, she meets record producer Kim Fowley and talks about starting an all-girl rock band. Interested, Kim introduces Joan to drummer Sandy West. Joan and Sandy become friends and start jamming when Kim suggests that they recruit an attractive blonde in the vein of Brigitte Bardot.

Kim and Joan comb Los Angeles' clubs to look for attractive blondes and discover Cherie. They invite her to audition at a trailer park in the San Fernando Valley and to prepare a Suzi Quatro song to perform at her audition. Cherie learns Peggy Lee's "Fever" instead and goes to audition, but the band is disappointed at her song choice. Kim and Joan then write "Cherry Bomb" on the spot for Cherie to audition with. Cherie sings the song and becomes part of the band, named the Runaways, joined by Lita Ford on lead guitar and Robin on bass. Joan and Cherie share a passionate kiss (but what follows between them is not explicit).

The Runaways are soon signed to Mercury Records and release an album. On account of the album's success, they travel to Japan to play a concert. Following their performance, Lita throws magazines at Cherie because they have sexy photos of Cherie only. Cherie is shocked because Kim told her the articles were to cover the whole band. As Lita, Cherie and Joan argue, overenthusiastic fans break through the window and chase the girls out of the building. Cherie's drug use worsens, until she overdoses in the hotel elevator and is sent to the hospital. Upon arriving back in the United States, Cherie begins to abuse her alcoholic father's painkiller medication.

At the studio recording their next album, Cherie refuses to sing after reading a cruel comment about her by Kim in a magazine article. Lita then rudely insults Cherie for being more popular than the rest of them; Cherie insists that she never asked for it. Kim orders Cherie to get in the booth and sing and Lita continues rudely insulting her. Though Joan defends her, Cherie angrily quits the band and leaves the studio. Joan is outraged, and the Runaways are finished. Cherie returns home while Joan starts her own band, Joan Jett and the Blackhearts. Cherie collapses again in a phone booth in an abandoned parking lot after attempting to buy cheap liquor for herself. At the hospital, her twin sister Marie visits her and orders her to straighten herself up.

A few years later, Cherie is working in a local bakery and hears Joan's cover of "I Love Rock 'n' Roll" on the radio and calls the station, where Joan is visiting for an interview. After an awkward conversation between Joan, Cherie, and radio host Rodney Bingenheimer, Cherie says her goodbyes and continues working, smiling when Joan's next song, "Crimson and Clover", comes on the radio.

== Cast ==
- Dakota Fanning as Cherie Currie
- Kristen Stewart as Joan Jett
- Michael Shannon as Kim Fowley
- Riley Keough as Marie Currie
- Stella Maeve as Sandy West
- Scout Taylor-Compton as Lita Ford
- Johnny Lewis as Scottie
- Alia Shawkat as Robin Robins (Note: The Runaways' actual bassist Jacqueline Fuchs, by then an attorney in the entertainment field, chose not to release her rights.)
- Hannah Marks as Tammy, Joan's friend
- Keir O'Donnell as Rodney Bingenheimer
- Tatum O'Neal as Marie Harmon, an actress and Cherie's mother
- Brett Cullen as Don Currie, Cherie's father
- Brendan Sexton III as Derek
- Robert Romanus as the guitar teacher
- Nick Eversman as Ricky

== Production ==
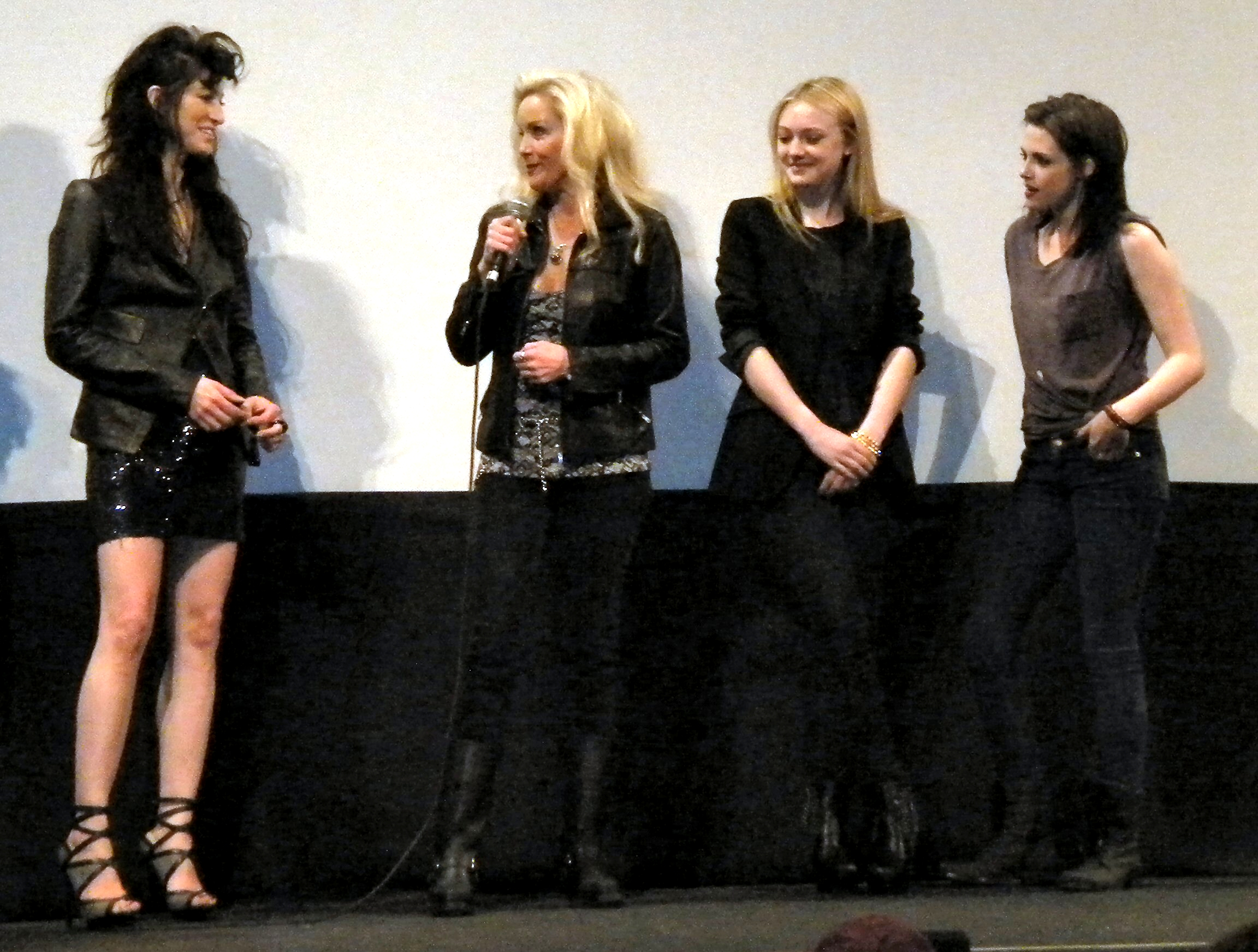
Floria Sigismondi, Cherie Currie, Dakota Fanning and Kristen Stewart

Music video director Floria Sigismondi made her feature film directorial debut with The Runaways. She said that she established early in development that she "wanted to make it a coming-of-age story and not a biographical film": "What I loved about the Runaways was that they were doing things that girls weren't supposed to do, especially at 15. [...] I wanted to capture what it was like to be super-young and thrown in this rock 'n' roll world at a time when girls are just trying to figure out their bodies and create their identities." She also "made it a very early decision that the story was going to be about Cherie [Currie] and Joan [Jett]. [...] And so that was a conscious effort, you know, to kind of really focus it and make it more personal on the two of them and their relationship."

Producers Art and John Linson had wanted a female director at the helm, with Art saying, "We felt from the beginning that this is really a tale of two young girls…[Cherie and Joan] getting in way over their heads in a world they knew very little about, a man's world, and there's a price to pay for that. We thought: It’s got to come from the heart of another woman.”

Jett was involved in the production as an executive producer, along with her manager Kenny Laguna. She said that "[she] felt confident with the level of success—the people at River Road, the Linsons [producers of the film]" and "knew [she] was in good hands" with Sigismondi writing and directing.

Sigismondi watched films from and set in the 1970s in developing the visual style of the film. "I wanted to keep it very raw, so I shot on Super-16 and kept it kind of smoky. The color palette was designed to be a little more California Valley [bright colors] in the beginning and tougher and harder-looking near the end, sort of void of color. Japan's looking sort of trippy and metallic, and when they come back everything looks a little bit different."

Actors portraying the band, including Dakota Fanning and Kristen Stewart, took vocal lessons and learned to play the instruments of their character counterparts. Fanning got on stage with the band Living Things as part of research for her role, saying, "I had never sung with a band before and felt the power of something like that behind me."

== Soundtrack ==
Music from the Motion Picture The Runaways

Soundtrack album by Various Artists
- Released: March 23, 2010
- Recorded: 1966–2009
- Genres: Hard rock, rock
- Length: 50:00
- Label: Atlantic

Music from the Motion Picture The Runaways was released on March 23, 2010.

No.	Title	Artist	Length
1.	"Roxy Roller"	Nick Gilder	2:49
2.	"The Wild One"	Suzi Quatro	2:51
3.	"It's a Man's Man's Man's World" (Live)	MC5	5:13
4.	"Rebel Rebel"	David Bowie	4:31
5.	"Cherry Bomb"	Dakota Fanning	2:19
6.	"Hollywood"	The Runaways	2:58
7.	"California Paradise"	Dakota Fanning	2:59
8.	"You Drive Me Wild"	The Runaways	3:22
9.	"Queens of Noise"	Dakota Fanning and Kristen Stewart	3:13
10.	"Dead End Justice"	Kristen Stewart and Dakota Fanning	6:36
11.	"I Wanna Be Your Dog"	The Stooges	3:13
12.	"I Wanna Be Where the Boys Are" (Live in Japan)	The Runaways	2:57
13.	"Pretty Vacant"	Sex Pistols	3:17
14.	"Don't Abuse Me"	Joan Jett	3:37

Professional ratings
Review scores
Source	Rating
AllMusic	3.5/5 stars

The film also includes "Lady Grinning Soul" by David Bowie, "Fujiyama Mama" by Wanda Jackson, "Do You Wanna Touch Me" by Gary Glitter, "Gimme Danger" by Iggy and the Stooges, "Vincent" by Don McLean, "I Love Rock 'n' Roll", "Bad Reputation", "Crimson and Clover", "I Want You" and "Love Is Pain" by Joan Jett and the Blackhearts. Kristen Stewart covers the Runaways' "I Love Playin' With Fire" in the film. The film included 34 credited songs, leaving 20 out of the official soundtrack, and it did not have an official composer.

== Release ==
Apparition acquired distribution rights to The Runaways in December 2009. It was slated to open nationwide March 19, 2010, in 1,400 theaters. The film's world premiere took place on January 24, 2010, at the Sundance Film Festival. Jett performed live in Park City the evening before the premiere and premiere night. Its Hollywood premiere took place March 11 at the ArcLight Hollywood.

The Runaways opened limitedly in the United States on March 19, 2010, in 244 theaters.

== Reception ==
Cherie Currie praised Fanning for her performance in the film, but noted that a number of events included in her book were not included in the film. She said "this is [the filmmakers'] movie. This is their portrayal. This is their version of the story. My book is a totally different story. My book is the real story. This is just a lighter kind of flash of what The Runaways were for a specific amount of time. How do you possibly take two and a half years and make it a film that's an hour and a half, and make it even closely touch what was truly going on? It’s an epic. The true story is an epic, and that’s just not anything that could have been done on film."

Joan Jett felt that the film captured 1970s Los Angeles, "that music, that sort of combination of glam and intensity" well, but said "initially it was mischaracterized, because at first it was called a 'biopic', which implies that it's going to be a literal reading of the action. But to me, it's more of a parallel narrative of The Runaways. It's based on Cherie's book, so it definitely comes from her perspective and focuses more on probably the two of us and Kim."

=== Critical response ===
The Runaways received generally positive reviews from critics. On review aggregator Rotten Tomatoes, the film has a 69% rating based on 193 reviews, and an average rating of 6.20/10. The site's critical consensus reads, "Viewers expecting an in-depth biopic will be disappointed, but The Runaways is as electric as the band's music, largely thanks to strong performances by Michael Shannon, Dakota Fanning and Kristen Stewart". On Metacritic, the film received an average score of 65 based on 36 reviews, indicating "Generally favorable reviews". The performances by Fanning, Stewart and Shannon were highlighted as some of the film's strongest elements.

Mick LaSalle of the San Francisco Chronicle noted that the film "doesn't always tell the literal truth" about the band, but felt that "[m]ore crucially, it conveys precisely what it was like to be young in the mid-1970s [...] And in getting that one thing right—in capturing that strange combination of despair and frustrated energy—it gets everything right." Roger Ebert gave The Runaways 3 stars out of 4, praising the performances of Shannon, Stewart and Fanning, while writing that the film's visuals and music "[helped] cover an underwritten script and many questions about the characters" which he found slimly developed. Dennis Harvey of Variety gave the film a positive review, commenting that it "proves [to be a] conventionally enjoyable making-and-breaking-of-the-band saga" and goes on to compliment the cinematography and soundtrack. A. O. Scott of The New York Times felt that Sigismondi "infuses crucial scenes with a rough, energetic spirit, and shows a willingness to accept the contradictions inherent in the material without prurience, moralism or too much sentimentality." Even if The Runaways "hits a few too many standard music biography beats" and "may be a little too tame in the end", he added, "at its best it is just wild enough."

Owen Gleiberman of Entertainment Weekly gave the film a B− and wrote that Sigismondi's "sixth sense for how the Runaways were bad-angel icons first and a rock 'n' roll band second" was the "most entertaining thing about" the film, which he described as a "highly watchable if mostly run-of-the-mill group biopic". Betsy Sharkey of the Los Angeles Times felt that the film, which she described as "a street-level snapshot" of the titular band's creation, should have featured Jett's story instead of staying "too narrowly focused" on that of Currie. David Edelstein of New York magazine gave the film a less positive review, commenting that "since the music itself is secondary, there's not a lot to this story," and adding "It’s Fanning's movie: You can taste the ex–child actor's relish for playing jailbait." Time praised the acting in the film, stating that Fanning "turns in a performance of startling maturity", "seduces us utterly" and is "like a mini-Meryl Streep". Nathan Rabin of The A.V. Club gave The Runaways a C, writing that the film is "numbingly familiar" and filled with "rock-movie clichés". He concluded, "The Runaways were the first major all-girl punk band. In honor of this distinction, they’re now the first major all-girl punk band to inspire a bleary, excessive, and altogether mediocre big-screen biography."

=== Box office and home media ===
The film's opening weekend gross was $805,115—placing it at No. 18 at the box office—averaging $3,300 per theater, and most of its audience that weekend were 25 or older. Apparition changed their marketing strategy due to the company's sudden shut down and reduced their planned wide release of 1,400 theaters to less than 300. It left theaters June 3 with a domestic gross of $3,573,673. Variety reported that the film's underperformance at the box office could have been due to underfunded marketing and a failure to find an audience with either an age demographic that would remember the band or with fans of Stewart for her performance in Twilight (2008).

The DVD for Region 1 and Blu-ray for Region A was released by Sony Pictures Home Entertainment on July 20, 2010.

== Nominations ==
- MTV Movie Awards – Best Kiss (2010)
- Teen Choice Awards – Choice Movie: Actress and Choice Movie: Drama. (2010)

== See also ==
- Edgeplay: A Film About the Runaways
- List of films about bands
- "Rock Star City Life", a 2011 song by Lenny Kravitz inspired by the film.
