= Queens of Noise =

Studio album by the Runaways
- Released: January 7, 1977
- Recorded: November 1976
- Studios: Brother (Santa Monica, California)
- Genres: Hard rock; glam rock; pop metal
- Length: 36:37
- Label: Mercury
- Producers: Kim Fowley; Earle Mankey

The Runaways chronology
The Runaways (1976)	Queens of Noise (1977)	Live in Japan (1977)

Singles from Queens of Noise
- 1. "Heartbeat" Released: February 1977 (US); 2. "Queens of Noise" Released: February 1977 (UK); 3. "Neon Angels on the Road to Ruin" Released: February 25, 1977 (Japan) 1977 (Austria); 4. "Midnight Music" Released: March 1977 (Germany)

Queens of Noise is the second studio album by the American rock band the Runaways, released on January 7, 1977, through Mercury Records. It is the last album to involve Cherie Currie and Jackie Fox as members of the band.

It is fundamentally a hard rock album, although it also exhibits influences from glam rock. While the album features a range of different tempos, most of it consists of the "heavy" guitar-driven tracks that have come to be seen as the Runaways' signature sound, although it also features two noticeably softer songs that have sometimes been described as early power ballads.

While stylistically similar to the band's self-titled debut album The Runaways, Queens of Noise features greater emphases on volume and musical sophistication. The album has received generally positive reviews and has remained the band's best-selling record in the United States.

== Background ==
The Runaways' line-up that produced and recorded Queens of Noise. From left to right, Lita Ford, Joan Jett, Jackie Fox, Sandy West, and Cherie Currie.

After their self-titled debut album achieved some critical and popular success in the summer of 1976, the Runaways retained the same five woman line-up for Queens of Noise: Cherie Currie (lead vocals), Lita Ford (lead guitar), Joan Jett (rhythm guitar), Jackie Fox (bass guitar), and Sandy West (drums).

According to Fox, the band was contractually obligated to produce two studio albums each year for their label (Mercury Records), which led to the eventual release of Queens of Noise on January 7, 1977.

Before the recording of Queens of Noise began, the increasingly poor relationship between the Runaways and their manager, Kim Fowley, led them to arrive at the mutual decision to bring in a different day-to-day producer for the album. The man selected to both engineer and produce the album was Earle Mankey, most famous for his work with the Beach Boys, although Fowley did remain involved in its production on a periodic basis.

== Recording ==
Queens of Noise was recorded in November 1976 at Mankey's Brothers Studio in Santa Monica, California, a facility most famous for its association with the Beach Boys.

According to Fox, the Runaways did much of the producing themselves, which resulted in a greater emphasis on volume as well as more musical sophistication than the "keep it simple" approach that Fowley preferred.

With the singular exception of "Midnight Music", all of the songs on the album were recorded in the same fashion: drums, bass, and rhythm guitar (except for the riffs) were all recorded "live" at the same time, with West, Fox, and Jett (respectively) all in sight of each other during recordings. They each recorded in separate rooms, however, in order to prevent their instruments from "bleeding" together during recording. Riffs, lead guitar solos, and vocals were then recorded later and ultimately mixed with the drum, bass, and rhythm guitar tracks to achieve the finished product. Ford used multiple techniques for recording her solos, including playing both through a mic'd amplifier and directly into the mixing board. According to Fox, West did not use a click track while recording.

In addition to the ten songs that were released on Queens of Noise, the Runaways also recorded two more during these sessions that did not ultimately make the final cut for the album: "Hollywood Dream" and "C'Mon".

Both of these songs were eventually included on the 1980 album Flaming Schoolgirls, which included previously unreleased material that was not made public until after the Runaways' breakup in 1979.

According to Fox, the recording and potential inclusion of "Hollywood Dream" on this album sparked a "true band rebellion" because only lead vocalist Currie wanted to see it released.

Ford and Fox were so displeased with the song that they both refused to record their respective instruments on the track, and with the support of Jett and West they helped ensure that it was not included in the finalized album.

== Release and packaging ==
The back cover of Queens of Noise, featuring the image that was originally intended for the front cover of the album.

Queens of Noise was released on LP record, cassette, and stereo 8 track tape.

The cover features all five of the Runaways dressed in similar black shirts and pants, all "clinging to long, metallic shafts" in a design that Marianne Moro describes as a "stripper pole album cover theme".

The Runaways are partially obscured by smoke in the photograph that was used on the front cover of the album, which according to Fox was taken "at the last moment before we all started choking". The back cover features a similar photograph that is posed differently and does not include any smoke, which Fox notes was originally intended to grace the front of the album, while the eventual front image was initially planned to be put on the back.

After Fox suggested that the smoke-filled image would draw more attention on the front of the album, as well as noting the practical concern that it would not lend itself well to having the track listing and other notes printed over it, Mercury Records agreed and switched the covers.

== Composition ==
Queens of Noise features a total of ten songs that are evenly split between the two sides of the original vinyl record. Nine of the ten songs were written or co-written by members of the band themselves, while the other (the title track "Queens of Noise") was written specifically for the Runaways, meaning that the album does not include any true covers.

Jett described herself as "really proud" of Queens of Noise as a whole and declared that it "is a lot more listenable" than The Runaways, while Fox felt that it is "not a very good album" overall.

=== "Queens of Noise" ===
The album's titular song has a "heavy" sound and features a distinctive riff as well as a guitar solo by Ford. The only song on the album that was not written or co-written by any of the Runaways themselves, "Queens of Noise" was penned by Billy Bizeau of the Quick, the other band that Fowley managed.

Jett noted that the title of the song was derived from a lyric in the song "American Nights" from the album The Runaways, while Fowley referred to it as a "great opening song and statement".

According to Fox, Currie believed that the song had been written with the intention that she would sing the lead vocals, but Jett insisted on singing them and, with the support of the rest of the band, did so. However, according to Currie, she was unable to sing the lead vocals because she had an abortion shortly before the song was recorded, and by the time she had recovered and returned to the studio, Jett had already recorded the lead vocals.

According to Fox, Currie was infuriated by the decision to include Jett's version on the album, although as a compromise she was allowed to sing the first verse during live performances of the song while Jett sang the second verse.

Both Fox and Andy Doherty believe that this song in particular serves as a microcosm of the growing tension between Currie and Jett over the issue of lead vocals, a tension reflected by those duties being evenly split between the two on this album.

=== "Take It or Leave It" ===
Written singlehandedly by Jett, who also handles lead vocal duties on the song, "Take It or Leave It" challenges the title track in terms of strength and power with its "thunderous" drumming from West, who begins the song with a drum fill, and "powerful" guitar playing by both Ford and Jett.

Barry Myers praised it as "possible single material" while Fowley referred to it as "pure Runaways", although Fox dismissed it as "one of my least favorite Runaways songs".

Alex Henderson nonetheless deemed it a "classic" in his review for AllMusic, along with the songs "Neon Angels On the Road to Ruin" and "I Love Playin' with Fire", while Jett noted that it "always went over really well" with audiences when it was played live.

=== "Midnight Music" ===
In sharp contrast to the first two songs on the album, "Midnight Music" is a softer and more melodic song with Currie on lead vocals. She was quite happy with the finished version of the song, remarking that it "turned out more fantastic than I thought it would".

Written by local songwriter Steven Tetsch, Fowley, and Currie together, Fox noted that the song was initially unpopular with the other four members of the band, but in 2000 remarked that upon further listening it was "actually one of the better songs on the album". Despite this, Doherty argued that it is not representative of the Runaways' style because it "lacks their spirit and rough around the edges approach".

=== "Born to Be Bad" ===
Written by Fowley, West, and Michael "Micki" Steele during the latter's brief tenure as bassist, "Born to Be Bad" is very slow in tempo and features "unusually mellow" lead vocals from Jett for part of the song.

Fox believed that Fowley intended the lyrics to refer at least in part to the Vietnam War but Jett interpreted them as concerning homeless people living in the Manhattan neighborhood of Bowery, a claim supported by Jett's declaration that the song is "about someone who is a born loser".

The song has received both highly positive and highly negative reviews. Myers lamented that it is "not one of the best tracks" on the album, while Fox dismissed it as "almost as embarrassing as 'Johnny Guitar'".

=== "Neon Angels on the Road to Ruin" ===
Written by Ford, Fowley, and Fox, "Neon Angels on the Road to Ruin" is driven by a slow riff and a guitar solo that are both provided by Ford.

Described simply as a "crunching heavy rock track" and "hard-ass rock", the song is considered by both Henderson and Doherty to be one of the best tracks on the album.

Fowley described it as reminiscent of a "European approach to heavy metal", while Fox viewed it as the band's "concession to Lita's heavy metal [desires]."

Currie's performance on lead vocals has been called "outstanding", although Fox observed that Currie hated to sing it live night after night because she had great difficulty repeatedly hitting the highest notes in the song.

=== "I Love Playin' with Fire" ===
The first track on the second side of the original album, "I Love Playin' with Fire" is the second song on Queens of Noise that was written by Jett alone.

It is an up-tempo song with Jett providing lead vocals that Myers describes as "divinely decadent", while it also features both a powerful riff and another guitar solo from Ford.

Fowley described the lyrical content of the song as Jett's perspective on "getting ripped off and almost destroyed by superficial love".

Fox remarked that it was "always a lot of fun to play" and that she thought that Ford's solo was "one of her best".

The song also features hand clapping during the third verse, which the Runaways recorded with a group of friends that included Rodney Bingenheimer, an experience that Fox remembered as an excruciatingly long process because "someone was off on every take".

=== "California Paradise" ===
Written by Fowley, Jett, West, and Kari Krome (Jett's friend and an important catalyst in the band's formation), "California Paradise" was the first of the Queens of Noise songs to be penned, and it was even one of the songs that Fox learned while auditioning for the band.

After beginning with another opening drum fill from West, the song quickly becomes a guitar-driven "stomping rock track" with Currie on lead vocals and Jett harmonizing with her on the choruses.

It is a unique track on the album because the guitar solo is split between Jett, who plays the first portion, and Ford.

Fowley described it as an "answer to 'California Girls' by the Beach Boys although musically it resembles a Gary Glitter record".

Fox praised it as "probably the best song on the album".

=== "Hollywood" ===
Written by Fowley, Fox, and Jett, "Hollywood" features Jett on lead vocals for the fifth and final time on the album, while Fox provides backing vocals.

According to Jett, the lyrics of the song concern "a girl wanting to become a star knowing that you can become one." Doherty described it as "one of the weaker [songs] on the album", although Myers considered it one of the four songs that made up the "consistently enjoyable" stretch between "I Love Playin' with Fire" and "Heartbeat".

=== "Heartbeat" ===
Originally written by Ford and Fox, "Heartbeat" was conceived as a mock love song to Joey Ramone and was initially intended to feature Fox on lead vocals.

Because Currie had already lost a significant number of lead vocals to Jett by the time it was recorded, Fowley decided to have Fox and Currie sing the lead vocals together in an effort to appease Currie, but Fox recalled that "Cherie's voice and mine didn't blend well at all" and they gave up trying to record together.

Without Fox's knowledge or approval, Currie and Fowley then rewrote the lyrics to be about David Bowie and recorded the vocals without Fox. According to Currie, "[Fowley] wrote something and I rearranged it and wrote the melody".

Jett described the lyrical content as the story of a frontman and a frontwoman who fall in love but "can't stay together because each one has to go their own way to help their career".

Myers described it as one of the album's two "tear-jerkers", along with "Midnight Music", and praised Currie's vocals as "irresistibly moody".

=== "Johnny Guitar" ===
The concluding track "Johnny Guitar" was written by Fowley and Ford, and at 7:15 it is more than twice as long as all but one of the other songs on Queens of Noise.

Described by Jett as a chance "for Lita to show off her lead guitar work", the "seven minute epic" has been criticized as "an unnecessary use of vinyl" and a "doom-laden attempt at a slow blues number".

Fox even went so far as to declare it "without a question the single worst song the Runaways ever did".

It has also garnered positive reviews, however, including Henderson's recognition of it being a "fine vehicle" for Ford's guitar playing and Moro's belief that it proved Ford "could actually play".

== Critical reception ==
Professional ratings
Review scores
Source	Rating
AllMusic	4.5/5 stars
Christgau's Record Guide	C−
The Rolling Stone Album Guide	2/5 stars
Sounds	3.5/5 stars

In a contemporary review, Sounds' Barry Myers said Queens of Noise features an "improved studio sound" and recommended it to his readers.

In a negative review for The Village Voice, Robert Christgau gave the album a grade of "C−" and panned the Runaways as "bimbos" whose singing sounds out of tune. He amended the grade to a "C" for Christgau's Record Guide: Rock Albums of the Seventies.

In a retrospective review for AllMusic, Alex Henderson referred to it as the Runaways' "outstanding sophomore effort ... hard rock that pulls no punches either musically or lyrically".

Andy Doherty called Queens of Noise "a real development" from The Runaways, deeming that it is "definitely worth a listen . . . in fact, quite a few listens".

In his book The Rough Guide to Rock, Peter Buckley praised Queens of Noise as "a pop-metal pinnacle".

== Releases and legacy ==
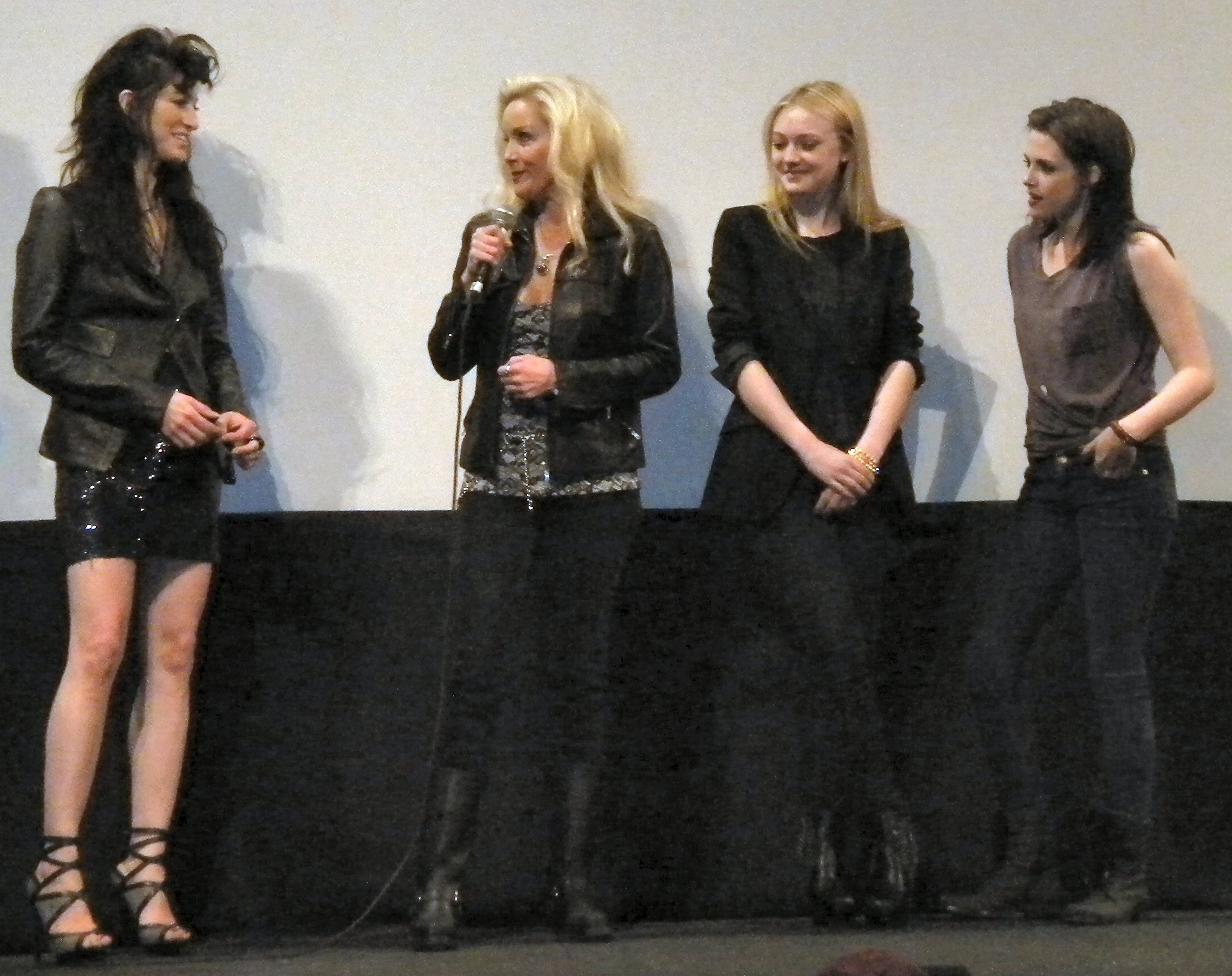
Floria Sigismondi, Cherie Currie, Dakota Fanning and Kristen Stewart at the SXSW 2010 screening of the film The Runaways.

Between 1997 and 2011, Queens of Noise was re-released on CD six separate times.

In 2008, it was included by Australian label Raven Records on a 22-song "2-for-1" CD that also included the entirety of The Runaways along with two selections from Waitin' for the Night.

While critics such as Myers recognized that the Runaways possessed "tremendous potential" going forward and eagerly anticipated their third studio album, Queens of Noise was the final studio album to feature either Currie or Fox.

Doherty described the losses of the band's lead vocalist and bassist, respectively, as "a pity as they were both strong in their respective fields".

Queens of Noise proved to be the best-performing of any of the Runaways' albums in the charts, reaching number 172 on the Billboard 200 in the United States. The eventual third album, Waitin' for the Night, failed to chart.

Multiple songs from the album were featured in the 2010 film about the band. In addition to the inclusion of the album version of "Hollywood", it also featured covers of "California Paradise", "Queens of Noise", and "I Love Playin' With Fire" recorded by Dakota Fanning and Kristen Stewart, who respectively portrayed Currie and Jett.

== Track listing ==
Credits adapted from the album liner notes.

Side One / Side A (Note: The liner notes and back cover of the album refer to the sides as "Side One" and "Side Two", while the disc itself is stamped with "Side A" and "Side B".)
No.	Title	Writer(s)	Lead vocals by	Length
1.	"Queens of Noise"	Billy Bizeau	Joan Jett	3:26
2.	"Take It or Leave It"	Jett	Jett	3:23
3.	"Midnight Music"	Cherie Currie, Kim Fowley, Steven Tetsch	Currie	2:47
4.	"Born to Be Bad"	Fowley, Michael Steele, Sandy West	Jett	4:28
5.	"Neon Angels on the Road to Ruin"	Lita Ford, Fowley, Jackie Fox	Currie	3:23

Side Two / Side B
No.	Title	Writer(s)	Lead vocals by	Length
6.	"I Love Playin' with Fire"	Jett	Jett	3:18
7.	"California Paradise"	Fowley, Jett, Kari Krome, West	Currie and Jett	2:52
8.	"Hollywood"	Fowley, Fox, Jett	Jett	2:56
9.	"Heartbeat"	Currie, Ford, Fowley, Fox, Earle Mankey	Currie	2:49
10.	"Johnny Guitar"	Fowley, Ford	Currie	7:15
Total length:				36:37

== Personnel ==
Adapted from the album liner notes.

Band members

- Lita Ford – lead guitar, groan on "Johnny Guitar"
- Joan Jett – rhythm guitar, 12-string guitar on "Born to be Bad", overdubbed first solo on "California Paradise", hand clapping on "Queens of Noise" and "I Love Playin' With Fire", lead and backing vocals
- Jackie Fox – bass guitar, hand clapping on "Queens of Noise", backing vocals on "Queen of Noise", "Take It Or Leave It", "Hollywood"
- Sandy West – drums, backing vocals on "Take It Or Leave It"
- Cherie Currie – lead and backing vocals, tambourine and snare on "Midnight Music"

Additional musicians M. Barle — hand clapping on "Queens of Noise" and "I Love Playin' With Fire" M. Gormley, B. Krayer — hand clapping on "Queens of Noise" G. Zipperman, K. J. Smythe, Karls — hand clapping on "I Love Playin' With Fire"

Production

- Kim Fowley – producer
- Earle Mankey – producer, engineer, mixer

== Charts ==
Chart (1977)	Peak position
Australian Albums (Kent Music Report)	36
Canada Top Albums/CDs (RPM)	83
Swedish Albums (Sverigetopplistan)	28
US Billboard 200	172
