= Look Away (2021 film) =

Documentary about sexual abuse in rock scene

- Directed by: Sophie Cunningham; Ben Steele
- Produced by: Sophie Cunningham; Sarah Foudy; Cheryl Hockey; Darren Kemp; Sarah Lambert
- Starring: Kari Krome; Jackie Fuchs; Julia Holcomb
- Music by: Nainita Desai
- Release date: 14 September 2021
- Running time: 90 minutes
- Country: United Kingdom
- Language: English

Look Away is a 2021 British documentary film about the sexual abuse of young girls in the rock music industry. The film was directed by Sophie Cunningham and Ben Steele, and produced by Sky Documentaries.

The film's title is derived from a track of the same name on Iggy Pop's 1996 album Naughty Little Doggie, which is a "tribute" to one of the most famous "baby groupies" on Sunset Strip in the 1970s, Sable Starr. The track of the same name mentions in its lyrics that Pop slept with Starr when she was 13, with none of the reviews of the album addressing the lyrics.

Look Away is built around extensive interviews with Kari Krome, founding member of and songwriter for the Runaways, the Runaways' bass guitarist Jackie Fuchs, and Julia Holcomb, who had a relationship at age 16 with Aerosmith's Steven Tyler. The documentary describes several rapes and other sexual abuse, including a detailed account of the alleged rape of Jackie Fuchs by her band's then-manager Kim Fowley. It also tells the story of the inappropriate relationship between Holcomb and Tyler as well as the alleged sexual assault of former Penthouse Pet, model, and actress Sheila Kennedy at the hands of Guns N' Roses frontman Axl Rose, and offers interviews of other people with experiences of sexual abuse in the United States rock scene in the '70s and '80s.

According to Cunningham, the purpose of the film "is not necessarily about seeking justice in the legal sense, but having a voice – and trying to instigate change. Although we are focusing on a certain era in this film, the music industry is still functioning in a very, very similar way."

== Reception ==
Uncut rated the film three and a half stars out of five, while The Telegraph, The Guardian and the Financial Times rated it four stars out of five.

The film was nominated for Broadcast Digital Award for Best Documentary Programme, and the director Sophie Cunningham was nominated in the Best Emerging Talent category in BAFTA Craft Awards 2022 for the film.

After the film was nominated by BAFTA, it was discussed on Instagram by Courtney Love, where she supported some of the claims made, commenting that Steven Tyler also adopted another 13-year-old girl in a similar fashion.
