= Waitin' for the Night =

Studio album by the Runaways
- Released: October 17, 1977
- Recorded: August 1977
- Studio: Larrabee (Hollywood, CA)
- Genres: Hard rock; glam punk
- Length: 39:01
- Label: Mercury
- Producer: Kim Fowley

The Runaways chronology
Queens of Noise (1977)	Waitin' for the Night (1977)	And Now... The Runaways (1978)

Professional ratings
Review scores
Source	Rating
AllMusic	3/5 stars
Christgau's Record Guide	C+
The Collector’s Guide to Heavy Metal	6/10
The Encyclopedia of Popular Music	2/5 stars
The Great Rock Discography	4/10
Music Week	2/4 stars
The New Rolling Stone Record Guide	2/5 stars
Sounds	5/5 stars
Spin Alternative Record Guide	4/10

Waitin' for the Night is the third studio album by American hard rock band the Runaways, released on October 17, 1977, through Mercury.

== Background ==
This is the band's first album to be recorded without Cherie Currie as she left the group two months before the album's release to pursue a solo career. Instead of replacing her with a new member, rhythm guitarist Joan Jett took over lead vocals and the band continued as a quartet. It is also their first to feature bassist Vicki Blue, replacing Jackie Fox. Though it failed to chart in the US, it was successful in Europe. The album entered at No. 34 on the Swedish Albums Chart, and the lead single 'School Days' peaked at No. 29 in Belgium.

== Track listing ==
Credited adapted from booklet of test pressing and original LP.

All tracks are written by Joan Jett (*), if other credits.

(United States) LP (Mercury Records – catalog number: SRM-1-3705) Side 1
No.	Title	Writer(s)	Length
1.	"Little Sister"	Inger Asten, *	3:04
2.	"Wasted"	*, Kim Fowley	3:24
3.	"Gotta Get Out Tonight"		3:31
4.	"Wait for Me"		4:53
5.	"Fantasies"	Lita Ford	5:36

Side 2
No.	Title	Writer(s)	Length
1.	"School Days"	*, Fowley	2:53
2.	"Trash Can Murders"	Ford	3:14
3.	"Don’t Go Away"		3:18
4.	"Waitin’ for the Night"	*, Kari Krome, Fowley, Ford	5:02
5.	"You’re Too Possessive"		4:06
Total length:			39:01

== Personnel ==
Credited adapted from booklet of original LP.

The Runaways

- Joan Jett – vocals (except track 4), rhythm guitar, handclaps (track 3), backing vocals
- Lita Ford – lead guitar, vocals (track 4), handclaps (track 3)
- Vicki Blue – bass, handclaps (track 3)
- Sandy West – drums, handclaps (track 3), backing vocals (track 4, 9 и 10), gong (track 5)

Session musicians

- Harvey Kubernik, Rodney Bingenheimer — handclaps (track 3)

Production

- Kim Fowley – producer
- Taavi Mote – engineer
- Sherry Klein – assistant engineer

== Charts ==
Chart (1977)	Peak position
Swedish Albums (Sverigetopplistan)	34
