= Victory Tischler-Blue =

American musician and filmmaker (born 1959)

Vicki Blue
- Also known as: Vicki Blue
- Born: Victory Tischler-Blue; September 16, 1959 (age 66); Newport Beach, California, U.S.
- Genres: Punk rock; heavy metal; glam rock
- Occupations: Musician; film producer; film director; screenwriter; photographer; actress
- Instrument: Bass guitar
- Years active: Music: 1977–1979; Directing: 2003–present
- Labels: Mercury; Cherry Red
- Website: victorytischlerblue.com

Victory Tischler-Blue (born September 16, 1959) is an American film producer, director, writer, musician and photographer. She was born and raised in Newport Beach, California. Tischler-Blue began working in the entertainment industry at age 17, using the name Vicki Blue as the bassist in the American all-girl teenage rock band the Runaways. After the demise of the band, she was cast as Cindy by director Rob Reiner in the 1984 film This Is Spinal Tap. Her film Edgeplay (2004) was based on her tenure in the Runaways.

== Music ==
Vicki Blue auditioned for the Runaways after bassist Jackie Fox left the band in the summer of 1977. She did well in her audition and became the Runaways' new bassist. Blue was credited for played bass on the Runaways third studio album, Waitin' for the Night (1977); however, Kim Fowley would not allow her to play bass and had Sal Maida play bass on that record instead. Despite that, she toured with them from fall of 1977 to late 1978. Blue left the band when they started recording And Now... The Runaways. She was credited for playing bass on that album but did not play on it at all.

Blue sang back up vocals on Girlschool's album Play Dirty released on November 8, 1983.

== Film ==
Vicki Blue played Cindy in This Is Spinal Tap (1984) and herself in The Return of Bruno (1987). Blue loved filmmaking so much that most of her career after the Runaways has consisted of producing, directing, and writing movies. Her best known release is Edgeplay: A Film About the Runaways (2004). Blue also produced the music video for former bandmate Lita Ford's 2012 single "Mother".

== Edgeplay ==
In 2004, Tischler-Blue released Edgeplay: A Film About the Runaways. It was picked up by Showtime Networks. Rob Reiner commented, "I was mesmerized ... This incredibly honest rock documentary film goes to 11". A 2010 film about the Runaways, starring Kristen Stewart, Dakota Fanning, and Michael Shannon cited Tischler-Blue's Edgeplay as an inspiration for elements of the film.

== Filmography ==
Year	Film	Role	Notes
1978	Rock 'N Roll Sports Classic	Herself	
1984	This is Spinal Tap	Cindy	
1987	The Return of Bruno	herself	
2005	Edgeplay: A Film About the Runaways	herself	

== Recent projects ==
In 2010, Tischler-Blue was the executive producer of two television programs that premiered in that year, El Guitarrista and The Rarebirds.

Tischler-Blue produced the official music video for Suzi Quatro's "Strict Machine", a track from her album In the Spotlight (2011). This track is a cover of Goldfrapp's "Strict Machine", but Quatro's version of the song contains two extra lines from her own number one hit "Can The Can" (in order to show the similarity of the two songs' tunes).

On November 16, 2011, the official music video was released via the SUZI QUATRO OFFICIAL YouTube channel. It includes live footage from Quatro's 2011 Rocks The Spotlight Tour of Australia and the extra two lines from "Can The Can".
