= Edgeplay: A Film About the Runaways =

- DVD cover
- Directed by: Victory Tischler-Blue
- Written by: Victory Tischler-Blue
- Produced by: Victory Tischler-Blue
- Starring: Lita Ford; Cherie Currie; Sandy West; Jackie Fox; Victory Tischler-Blue; Kim Fowley; Suzi Quatro
- Production company: Sacred Dogs Entertainment Group
- Distributed by: Image Entertainment
- Release date: May 6, 2004 (Beverly Hills Film Festival)
- Running time: 110 minutes
- Country: United States
- Language: English

Edgeplay: A Film about the Runaways is a 2004 American documentary film produced and directed by former Runaways bassist Victory Tischler-Blue. Edgeplay chronicles the history of the all-teenage-girl rock band the Runaways, whose members included future rock stars Lita Ford and Joan Jett. The film premiered as part of filmmaker Allison Anders' 2004 "Don't Knock the Rock Film and Music Festival".

Kim Fowley, the band's original manager, originally asked for $10,000 appearance fee in order to appear in the film, but eventually agreed to appear for free if he could sing his answers to questions, with a guitarist accompanying him. Vicki Blue agreed and this is how his appearance was originally shot. However, he then informed her that each of his answers was a song that would require a separate license. Fowley was shooting a segment for VH1 at about that time, so Blue sent her questions to the VH1 folks, who agreed to let her use their footage. The film ultimately casts blame on Fowley for the Runaways' breakup.

Conspicuously absent from the film was Jett, who refused to participate in interviews or allow any of her music to be used, and as Jett wrote or co-wrote most of the Runaways music, very few of the band's songs were able to be used on the soundtrack, which had to feature musical contributions mostly performed by Ford or Suzi Quatro.

In a 2006 interview with the Montreal Mirror, Jett said:

"To me, the Runaways is my baby, so you have to understand my perspective. If there's gonna be a Runaways movie, it should be about what we accomplished, the tours we did, the bands we played with, the people we inspired. I'm not gonna participate in a Jerry Springer fest, bottom line. With any band, you're gonna have interpersonal conflicts, but if that's what they thought the Runaways were about—about breaking a bass or putting on make-up—well, it's very disappointing. Very, very disappointing. I wanted nothing to do with it because that's not the band I was in. [The film] was a totally different take on what went down."

Shortly after the film was released, Sandy West, the band's drummer, was diagnosed with cancer. She died on October 21, 2006.

== Reception ==
- "Tischler-Blue has pulled-together a harrowing tale of '70s rock'n'roll excess and shattered dreams that rivals any rock documentary ever made... the showbiz veneer is replaced by a kind of brutal honesty that doesn't make it to the silver screen much these days. 'Edgeplay' dodges the usual pre-sweetened rock'n'roll clichés, and goes straight for the jugular." (Chris Parcellin, Film Threat, 2005)
- "Edgeplay adheres to a very linear structure, starting off with the germ of an idea that would bring the band together and concluding with the events that split them apart, but after a lengthy retelling of how these five girls became The Runaways, it's more or less wall-to-wall dirt." (Adam Tyner, DVD Talk, 2005)
- "Blue employs crafty editing techniques to recreate some of the more memorable events in the band history as told from the perspective of each member. It's like a rock n' roll Roshomon [sic], with the truth being relative to the teller of each tale." (Karman Kregloe, AfterEllen.com, 2005)

== See also ==
- The Runaways (2010 film)
