= Jackie Fox =

American bassist (born 1959)

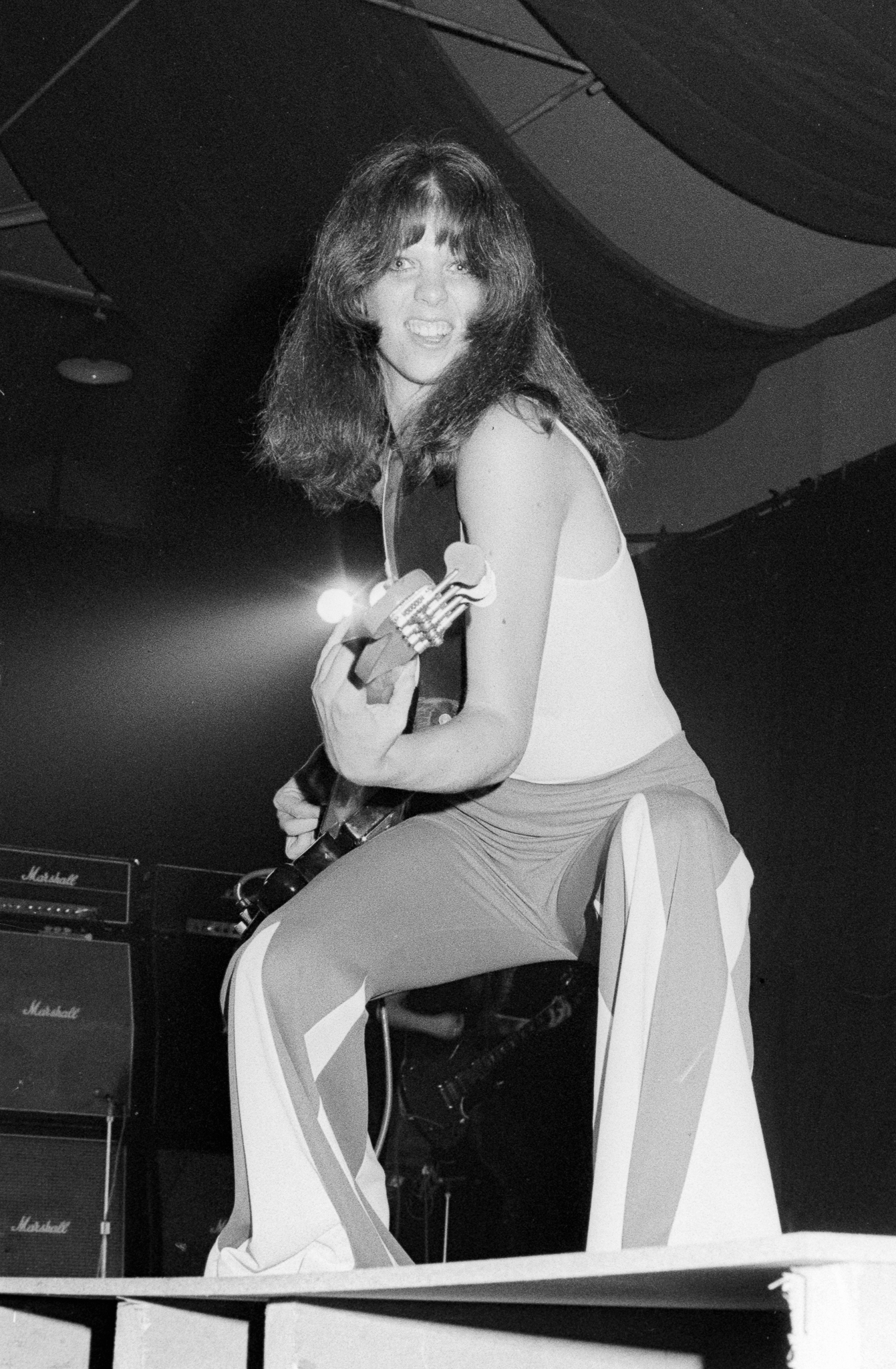
- Fox onstage in 1976

Background information
- Born: Jacqueline Louise Fuchs; December 20, 1959 (age 66); Los Angeles, California, U.S.
- Genres: Punk rock; hard rock; heavy metal
- Occupation: Musician
- Instrument: Bass guitar
- Years active: 1975–1977; 1994

Jacqueline Louise Fuchs (born December 20, 1959) is an American former musician. Under her stage name Jackie Fox, she played bass guitar for the pioneering all-girl teenage rock band the Runaways. She is the sister of screenwriter Carol Fuchs and sister-in-law of Castle Rock Entertainment co-founder Martin Shafer.

== The Runaways ==
A Merit scholar, Fuchs had gained early admission to UCLA to study math when the opportunity to join the fledgling rock band the Runaways arose. Fuchs was "discovered" dancing at the Starwood by Rodney Bingenheimer (the self-proclaimed "mayor of the Sunset Strip"), who introduced her to producer/impresario Kim Fowley. Initially she auditioned for lead guitar, but the band hired Lita Ford for that. Some time later, she was called back to play bass; she accepted the offer, and joined the Runaways in 1975, shortly before her 16th birthday.

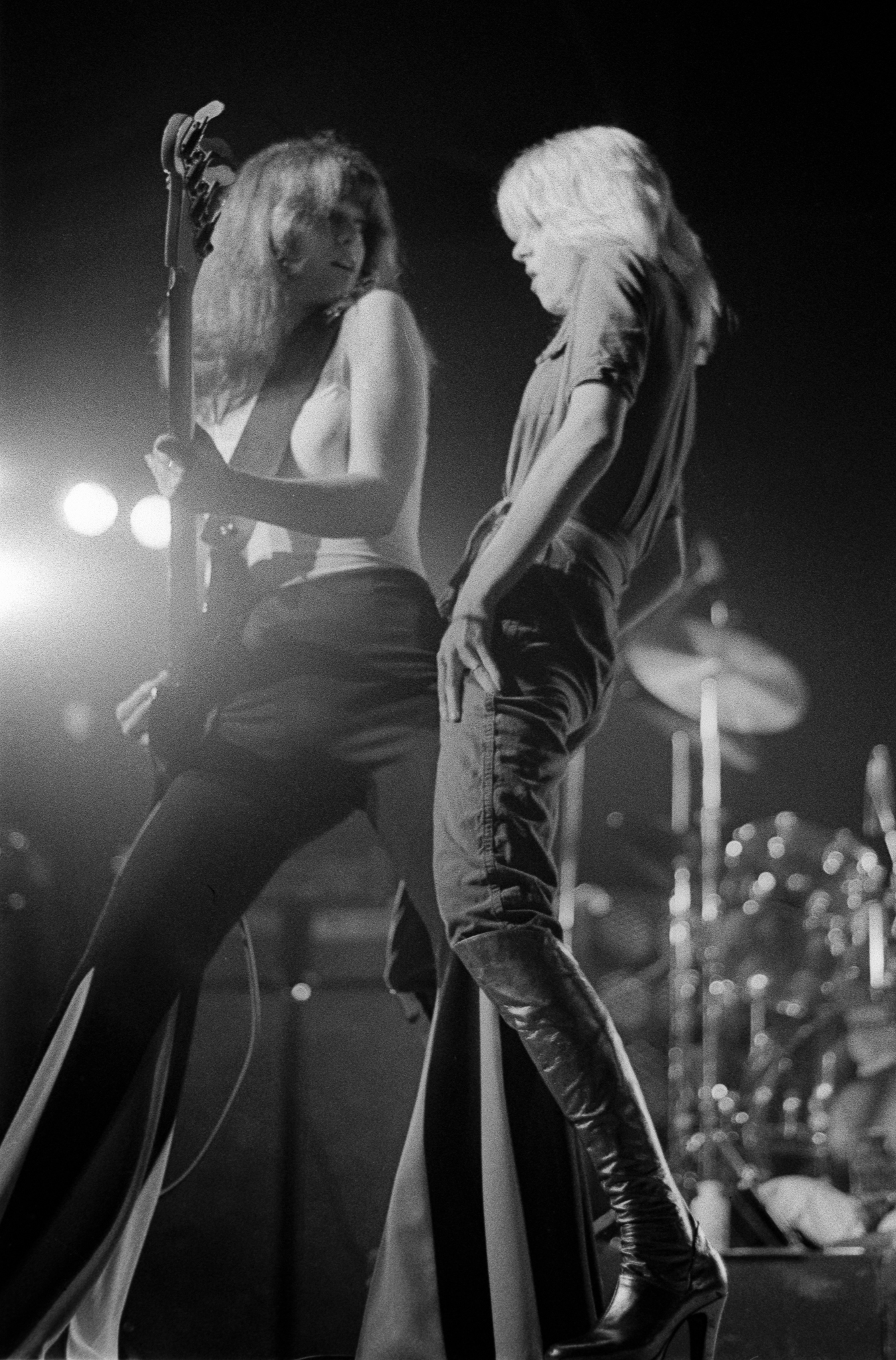
Fuchs (left) on stage with Cherie Currie, 1976

Fuchs played on the Runaways' second studio album, Queens of Noise, but not on their 1976 debut album. According to multiple sources, including Cherie Currie's memoir Neon Angel and the liner notes of the Raven Records release of The Runaways, Blondie bassist Nigel Harrison was hired to play bass on the first album due to Fowley's refusal to let Fuchs play on the record. Fuchs confirms this.

Fuchs's final appearance with the Runaways was on their 1977 Live in Japan album. It was during the Japanese Tour on which that album was recorded that Fuchs decided to leave the band. According to Fuchs, in the 2005 documentary film Edgeplay: A Film About the Runaways, she was distraught over the band members' inability to get along with each other and called her close friend Randy Rhoads of the L.A. band Quiet Riot, who encouraged her to come home. Victory Tischler-Blue (AKA "Vicki Blue") was quickly hired as her replacement.

Fuchs could still be seen on Flaming Schoolgirls (1980), an outtakes compilation featuring songs recorded during the Queens of Noise recording sessions in 1976. She later appeared again on the compilation albums Neon Angels and The Best of the Runaways.

Fuchs played bass at the Runaways reunion in 1994 with Currie and West. Currie's sister Marie also performed with the band that night.

Fuchs denied permission for her name to be used in the 2010 feature film The Runaways. Instead, the producers created a fictional character, Robin (portrayed by actress Alia Shawkat), as the band's bassist in the film.

== After the Runaways ==
In the years following her tenure with the Runaways, Fuchs worked in a variety of fields, most notably as a record promotions executive, a modeling agent, the promoter of Tony Robbins's Firewalking seminars, and most recently an entertainment attorney in the motion picture and television business, representing actors, writers, directors, authors, and producers.

In a live rendition of the song "Suicide Machine" by punk rock band Germs, Darby Crash is heard saying he is looking for Jackie and that the song is dedicated to her.

Fuchs earned her B.A. summa cum laude from UCLA in linguistics and Italian, with a specialization in computing, and her J.D. from Harvard, where Barack Obama was one of her classmates. She has written a script called "Delilah's Scissors" with Victory Tischler-Blue and appeared in Tischler-Blue's 2005 documentary Edgeplay: A Film About the Runaways. Fuchs has also written for the Huffington Post blog.

Fuchs appeared as a contestant on The Dating Game circa 1980.

In 2013, Fuchs appeared as a contestant in the fourth episode of The Chase, and on September 6, 2013, she was a contestant on the syndicated version of Who Wants to Be a Millionaire?, then hosted by Cedric the Entertainer. She had banked $16,100, but ended up with only $1,000 after missing a question. In December 2018, she appeared on Jeopardy!, winning $87,089 over the course of four games.

Since the COVID-19 pandemic, Fuchs has been involved in board games. In 2024, Devir Games published her first board game named Rock Hard: 1977, which is a fictionalization of her time in the music industry.

== Kim Fowley sexual assault allegation ==
In July 2015, six months after Fowley's death, Fuchs alleged that he raped her on New Year's Eve 1975 at a party following a Runaways performance at an Orange County club. Sixteen years old at the time, Fuchs was reportedly given Quaaludes by a man she thought was a roadie and, while she was incapacitated, Fowley raped her in full view of a group of partygoers and her bandmates Currie, West, and Jett. Lita Ford was not present. Look Away (2021), a documentary about sexual abuse in the rock music industry, features Fuchs' story.

West's location at the time of the incident is unknown, but Fuchs said that her last memory of the night was seeing Currie and Jett staring at her as Fowley raped her. Kari Krome (co-founder and songwriter for the group) stated that she saw "Jett and Currie sitting off to the side of the room for part of the time, snickering" during the rape. Jett has publicly denied witnessing the incident "as described", while Currie said that she spoke up against Fowley's actions then stormed out of the room when he refused to stop.

Referring to Fowley's rape of Fuchs, Victory Tischler-Blue (Fuchs's replacement in the group) said that all the members of the group "have always been aware of this ugly event".

== Discography ==
Albums by the Runaways

- The Runaways (August 1976) (although she was credited, Fox did not play on the album)
- Queens of Noise (1977)
- Live in Japan (1977)
- Flaming Schoolgirls (1980) (compilation)
