= The Runaways =

American rock band (1975–1979)

- The Runaways in 1976 (clockwise from top left): Lita Ford, Sandy West, Jackie Fox, Joan Jett, Cherie Currie

Background information
- Origin: Los Angeles, California, U.S.
- Genres: Hard rock; glam rock; punk rock; glam punk
- Years active: 1975–1979
- Labels: Mercury; Rhino; Cherry Red
- Past members: Joan Jett; Sandy West; Kari Krome; Micki Steele; Lita Ford; Peggy Foster; Cherie Currie; Jackie Fox; Vicki Blue; Laurie McAllister
- Website: therunaways.com

The Runaways were an American rock band who recorded and performed from 1975 to 1979. Formed in 1975 in Los Angeles, the band released four studio albums and one live album during its run. Among their best-known songs are "Cherry Bomb", "Hollywood", "Queens of Noise", and a cover-version of the Velvet Underground's "Rock & Roll". Never a major success in the United States, the Runaways became a sensation overseas, especially in Japan, thanks to the single "Cherry Bomb".

== History ==
=== Early years ===
In early 1975, the rock producer Kim Fowley had an idea for assembling an all-female band at a time when, according to guitarist Joan Jett, "There were no young girls at all playing guitar or any sort of instruments."

Fowley met lyricist Kari Krome at a party held for Alice Cooper, put her on salary, and had her begin looking for female performers. Krome met Joan Jett and brought her to Fowley. Jett successfully auditioned for Fowley by playing ukulele to a Sweet album, and picked up guitar as her instrument. Soon afterward, in the parking lot of the Rainbow Bar and Grill, Fowley met Sandy West, who agreed to play drums. Fowley had Jett rehearse with West at the latter's home in Huntington Beach, and auditioned the pair on the telephone to music journalist Ritchie Yorke. He then turned to two radio stations to advertise for further auditions, which brought lead vocalist/bassist Micki Steele (later of the Bangles).

The Runaways were formed in August 1975. Fowley touted the new group the Runaways as "an all-girl answer to Grand Funk," and the band signed to Kim Fowley Productions for management in September 1975. The lineup of Jett, West, and Steele made its live debut playing the Whisky a Go Go September 28–29, opening for Fowley's previous conceptual band the Hollywood Stars (then billed as "The Stars").

On October 30, Steele left due to creative differences. In November, bassist Peggy Foster joined, as well as Lita Ford as lead guitarist, allowing Jett to focus on rhythm guitar.

Fowley and Jett discovered Cherie Currie at the teen nightclub The Sugar Shack and brought her in as lead vocalist for the group.

In two weeks, Foster left the group too and was replaced by Jackie Fox, whom Fowley's colleague Rodney Bingenheimer found dancing at the West Hollywood nightclub the Starwood.

=== Fame ===
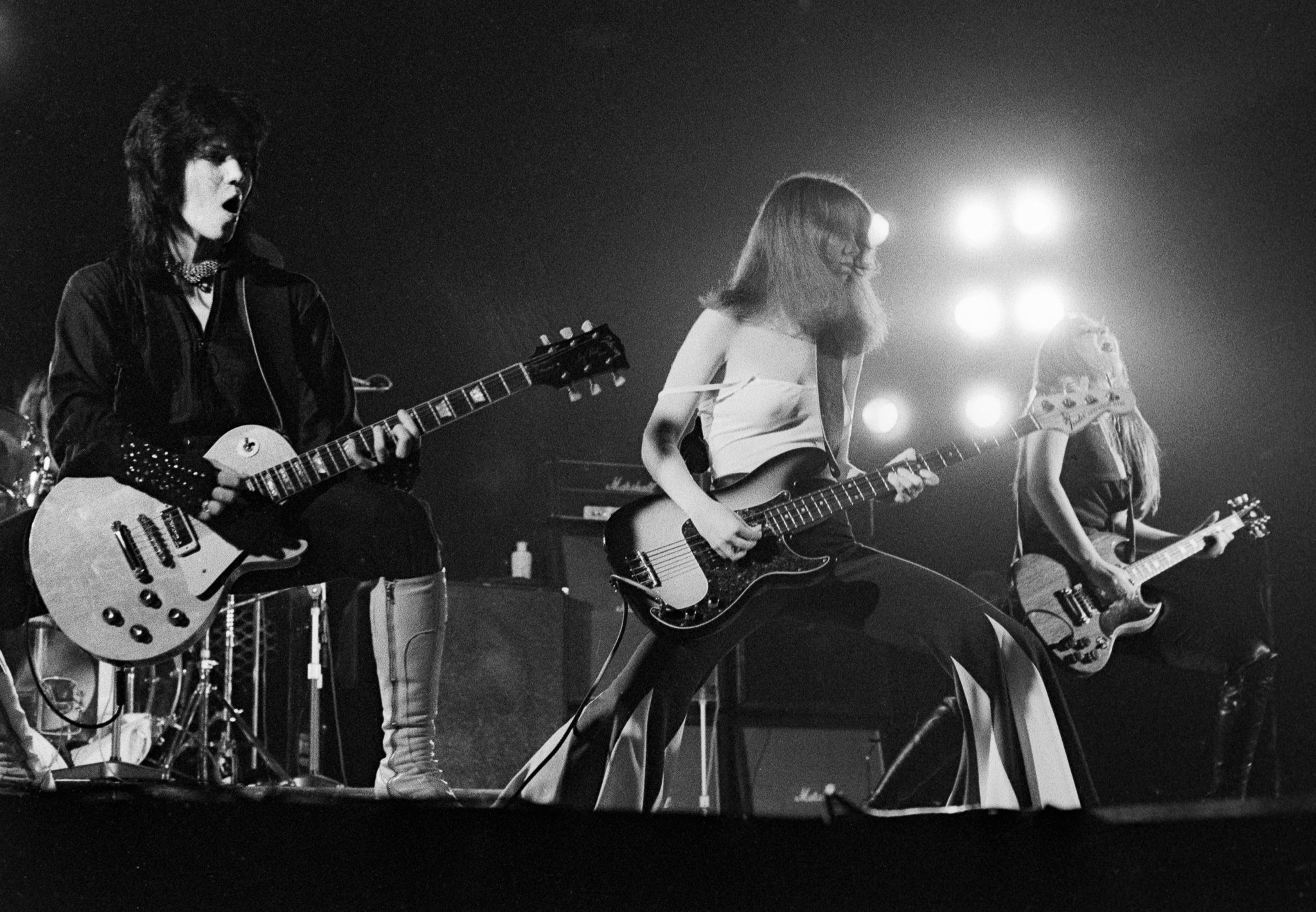
The Runaways performing at Brumrock '76, Bingley Hall, Birmingham, UK, on September 26, 1976. Left to right: Joan Jett, Jackie Fox and Lita Ford.

Phonogram/Mercury Records' West Coast director of A&R, Denny Rosencrantz, agreed to sign the Runaways on December 12, 1975. The band recorded their debut album The Runaways in January 1976 and released it in March through Mercury. The album debuted at number 188 on the Cash Box top albums chart, received favorable reviews, and was promoted through numerous radio ads, achieving sales of 70,000 units in 1976.

The band toured the U.S. and headlined for groups such as Cheap Trick, and Tom Petty and the Heartbreakers. For their stage performance, the 2004 documentary Edgeplay: A Film About the Runaways (directed by former Runaway bassist Vicki Blue) revealed each girl patterned herself after their musical idol: Currie on David Bowie, Jett on Suzi Quatro, Ford on a cross between Jeff Beck and Ritchie Blackmore, West on Roger Taylor, and Fox on Gene Simmons.

The Runaways were the subject of a writeup in People magazine in September 1976. A week later, Fowley severed his ties with the band and forfeited his rights, titles, claims, and merchandising ownership to Mercury Records. Mercury refused to accept Fowley's stakehold in the band and turned it back to him the following week. Fowley and the band reconciled in November and returned to the studio to record their followup album Queens of Noise. The album was released on January 7, 1977.

In the summer of 1977, booking agent David Libert secured headlining dates in Japan, where they played a string of sold-out shows and were greeted by an onslaught of fans at the airport, which Jett later described as "just like Beatlemania". While in Japan, the Runaways had a TV special, made numerous television appearances, and recorded the album Live in Japan, which went gold. Jackie Fox was replaced by bassist Vicki Blue when the group returned to America.

Cherie Currie left the band on August 9, 1977. Fowley recorded the Runaways' third LP, Waitin' for the Night, at Larrabee Studios the same month, with the band as a four-piece and with Joan Jett on vocals. The album was released on October 17, 1977, and was the final album that Fowley would record with the group.

=== Dissolution ===
Due to disagreements over money and the management of the band, the Runaways and Kim Fowley parted ways in 1977. The group quickly hired Toby Mamis, who worked for Blondie and Suzi Quatro. When the group split from Fowley, they also parted with their record label Mercury/PolyGram, to which their deal was tied. In the Edgeplay documentary, members of the group (especially Fox and Currie) as well as the parents of Currie and West, have accused Fowley and others assigned to look after the band of broken promises as to schooling and other care, using divide and conquer tactics to keep control of the band, along with the verbal taunting of band members. The band reportedly spent much time enjoying the excesses of the rock 'n' roll lifestyle during this time. They partnered with Thin Lizzy producer John Alcock, after Jett's future partner Kenny Laguna turned down the job, to record their last album And Now... The Runaways.

Blue left the group due to medical problems and was briefly replaced by Laurie McAllister in November 1978. McAllister was referred to the band by her neighbor, Duane Hitchings, who played keyboards on And Now... The Runaways. Before joining the Runaways, McAllister played with Baby Roulette and the Rave Ons, who had one song released on a Kim Fowley compilation LP called Vampires From Outer Space. McAllister appeared onstage with the Runaways at their final shows in California in December 1978 and quit in January 1979.

Disagreement among band members included the musical style; Jett wanted the band to make a musical change, shifting towards punk rock/glam rock while Ford and West wanted to continue playing hard rock/heavy metal music. Neither would accept the other's point of view. The band played their last concert on New Year's Eve 1978 at the Cow Palace and officially broke up in April 1979.

=== Potential reunion ===
In 2010, Jett and Currie reunited to re-record the song "Cherry Bomb" for the video game Guitar Hero: Warriors of Rock.

In a 2015 interview with WHMH-FM, Ford said that she decided against a possible reunion in the early 1990s because "Nirvana was just kicking in, and it was really bad timing; it wouldn't have worked. People would have just turned their nose up at it."

In December 2018, Ford said that a Runaways reunion would never happen.

On May 12, 2021, Currie was asked about a reunion, to which she responded,

I've played with all the girls individually; I've played with all of them—with Lita, with Joan, and, of course, with Sandy; I never did a show without her before she passed away. So I'm the only one that's actually played with all the members. Lita and Joan have a little bit of an issue, and that just seems to be the problem. Lita doesn't like Kenny. I wish they would get over it, honestly, but I don't think so. Kenny was my manager during the early stages of making Blvds Of Splendor. We were very good friends for 20 years. But then, unfortunately, with the record, with them holding up Blvds Of Splendor for 10 years, that kind of eroded my friendship with him a bit.

== After the breakup ==
The Runaways after 1979

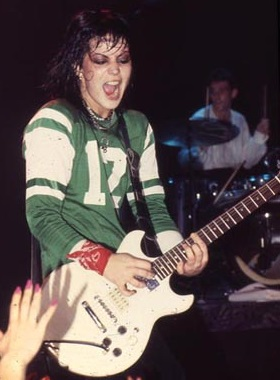
Joan Jett in the 1980s

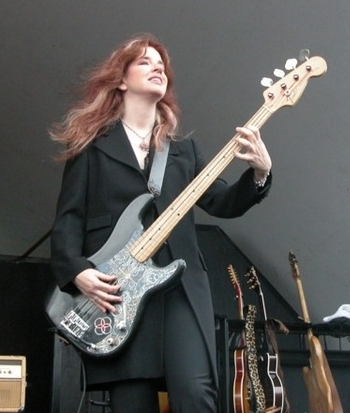
Micki Steele in 2003

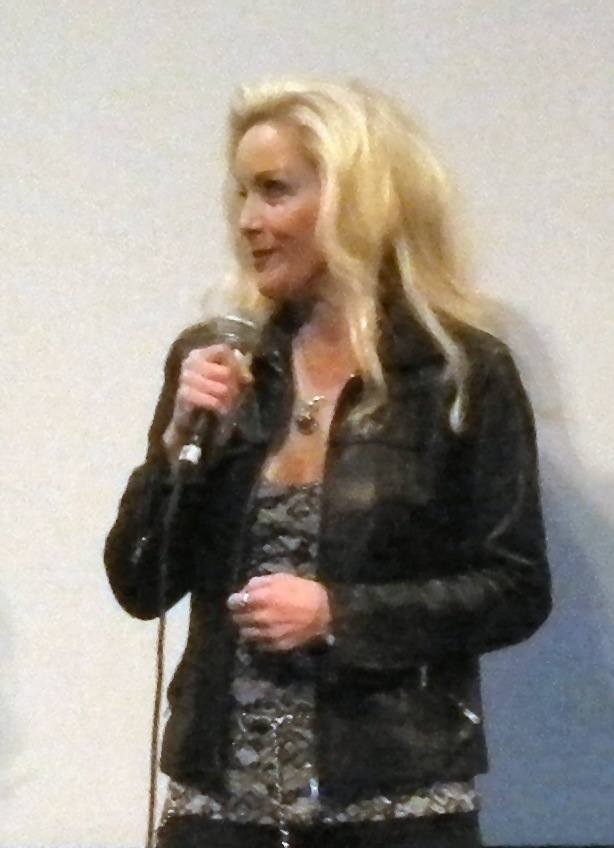
Cherie Currie in 2010

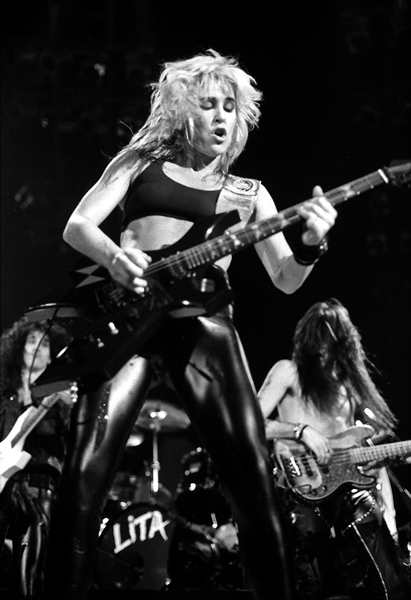
Lita Ford in 1988

=== Joan Jett ===
Jett went on to work with producer Kenny Laguna and after being rejected by 23 record labels, formed their own label, Blackheart Records, in 1980. In doing so, Jett became one of the first female recording artists to found her own record label. The label continues to release albums by the Blackhearts and other bands. Jett went on to have massive success with a cover of the Arrows' song "I Love Rock 'n' Roll", as well as "Crimson and Clover", "Bad Reputation", and "I Hate Myself for Loving You". She also co-starred in the 1987 film Light of Day with Michael J. Fox, and appeared in the 2000 Broadway revival of The Rocky Horror Show as Columbia. Jett is on Rolling Stone magazine's list of "The 100 Greatest Guitarists of All Time". In 2015, she and her band the Blackhearts were inducted into the Rock and Roll Hall of Fame.

=== Sandy West ===
West continued her association with John Alcock once the group disbanded. She formed the Sandy West Band and toured California throughout the 1980s and 1990s. She also did session work with John Entwistle of the Who and became a drum teacher.

West died from lung cancer in October 2006, having been diagnosed the previous year. A memorial tribute concert was later held in Los Angeles, featuring the Sandy West Band, Cherie Currie, the Bangles, the Donnas, and Carmine and Vinny Appice, among several others.

=== Micki Steele ===
Steele (as Michael Steele) joined the band the Bangles and went on to success with songs such as "Manic Monday", "Walk Like an Egyptian" and "Eternal Flame".

=== Cherie Currie ===
Upon leaving the Runaways, Currie released a 1978 solo album titled Beauty's Only Skin Deep and a 1980 duet album with her twin sister Marie Currie, Messin' with the Boys, in which the duo was backed by members of Toto. The Curries' cover of Russ Ballard's "Since You Been Gone" reached Number 95 on the U.S. chart. Currie also appeared in a number of films, most notably Foxes with Jodie Foster. Throughout the 1990s, Currie worked as a drug counselor for addicted teens and as a personal fitness trainer. She married actor Robert Hays and they had a son together, Jake Hays. The couple divorced in 1997.

Currie still performs and records, remaining under contract with Blackheart Records, but her current passion is chainsaw carving which she displays at an art gallery in Chatsworth, California. In 2013, Cherie recorded two songs with Alexx Michael for the Munich-based hard rock-glam metal group Shameless, which were released on the album Beautiful Disaster on October 2, 2013. Currie's most recent solo album, Blvds of Splendor, was released in 2020.

On October 18, 2026, Currie confirmed that she had suffered a stroke and was admitted to the hospital. Jackie Fox posted her well wishes on social media saying "Wishing Cherie Currie well with her current health issues." Currie gave an update on October 20, 2026 saying "My X family. I was released from hospital yesterday but was too tired to let you know. I’ll do a video tomorrow after some rest and quiet time to explain what is happening and why. Love you hugely. Big time."

=== Lita Ford ===
Ford returned to PolyGram as a solo artist in the 1980s, where she released several albums before pairing with manager Sharon Osbourne. She had success with songs like "Kiss Me Deadly" and "Close My Eyes Forever" (the second a duet with her manager's husband Ozzy Osbourne). She was married to Chris Holmes of W.A.S.P., and to former Nitro singer Jim Gillette, with whom she has two sons. After a long hiatus, Ford staged a comeback, performing at Rock The Bayou and other hard rock festivals during the summer of 2008. She released Wicked Wonderland, her first studio album in 14 years, on October 6, 2009. During that year Ford toured as a special guest of progressive metal band Queensrÿche and performed songs from Wicked Wonderland and reprised her duet "Close My Eyes Forever" with Queensrÿche lead singer Geoff Tate.

=== Vicki Blue ===
Vicki Blue is now known as Victory Tischler-Blue. After leaving the Runaways, she shifted her focus to film and television production eventually becoming a producer/director for several reality- and magazine-based television shows including Entertainment Tonight, Access Hollywood, and Real Stories of the Highway Patrol. She went on to form Sacred Dogs Entertainment Group a motion picture production company and released a documentary on the Runaways called Edgeplay: A Film About the Runaways. In 2005, Tischler-Blue directed Naked Under Leather, a documentary about fellow female rocker Suzi Quatro, which was selected for the Santa Cruz Film Festival in May 2004 but never released. Focusing on music driven productions, she was tapped to executive produce a network special: The Bee Gees "Unbroken Fever"—The 30th Anniversary of Saturday Night Fever. Additionally, Tischler-Blue and Ford teamed up to record music for El Guitarrista, an animated series that Sacred Dogs Entertainment Group is producing.

=== Jackie Fox ===
Fox returned to using her birth name of Fuchs and graduated from UCLA summa cum laude, with a Bachelor of Arts in Linguistics and Italian. She later received a Juris Doctor from Harvard Law School and practices entertainment law. She co-wrote "Delilah's Scissors" with Tischler-Blue and executive-produced and appeared in Edgeplay, Tischler-Blue's 2005 documentary about the Runaways. She also writes an L.A. cat care column for Examiner.com and is an occasional contributor to Listverse.com. She is the author of The Well, an unpublished work of young adult historical fiction, and is currently working on her second novel. In December 2018 she won four games on the game show Jeopardy!

In July 2015, after Fowley's death, Fuchs revealed publicly that Fowley raped her on New Year's Eve 1975 at a party after a Runaways performance at a club in Orange County. Sixteen years old at the time, she was reportedly given Quaaludes by a man who she thought was a roadie and raped while she was incapacitated. Currie said she spoke up against Fowley's actions, then stormed out of the room when he refused to stop. Look Away, a documentary about sexual abuse in the rock music industry features Fuchs' story.

=== Laurie McAllister ===
McAllister joined another of Fowley's all-female bands, the Orchids, who released their only album in 1980. McAllister retired from the music industry and worked as a veterinarian technician in Eugene, Oregon. She died of complications from an asthma attack on August 25, 2011 at the age of 54.

== Members ==
Image	Name	Years active	Instruments	Release contributions
	Joan Jett	1975–1979	rhythm guitar; lead guitar (1975, 1976); lead and backing vocals; bass (1977)	all releases
	Sandy West	1975–1979 (died 2006)	drums; backing and occasional lead vocals	all releases
	Kari Krome	1975	lead vocals	none
	Micki Steele	1975	bass; lead vocals	Born to be Bad (1991); Cherokee Studios Demos (2024)
	Lita Ford	1975–1976; 1976–1979	lead guitar; backing vocals (from 1977); rhythm guitar (1977, 1979); bass and lead vocals (1978)	all releases, except Born to be Bad (1991) and Cherokee Studios Demos (2024)
	Peggy Foster	1975	bass	none
	Cherie Currie	1975–1977	lead vocals	The Runaways (1976); Queens of Noise (1977); Live in Japan (1977); Flaming Schoolgirls (1980); The Best of the Runaways (1982); Neon Angels (1992); 20th Century Masters - The Millennium Collection: The Best of the Runaways (2005) nine tracks; The Mercury Albums Anthology (2010) (twenty tracks); Live (Agora Ballroom, Cleveland - July 19, 1976) (2015)
	Jackie Fox	1975–1976; 1976–1977	bass; backing vocals	The Runaways (1976); Queens of Noise (1977); Live in Japan (1977); Flaming Schoolgirls (1980); The Best of the Runaways (1982); Neon Angels (1992); 20th Century Masters - The Millennium Collection: The Best of the Runaways (2005) nine tracks; The Mercury Albums Anthology (2010) (twenty tracks); Live (Agora Ballroom, Cleveland - July 19, 1976) (2015)
	Vicki Blue	1977–1978	bass; backing vocals	Waitin' for the Night (1977); And Now... The Runaways (1978) (credited only); Little Lost Girls (1981); I Love Playin' with Fire (1982); The Runaways featuring Joan Jett and Lita Ford (1997); 20th Century Masters - The Millennium Collection: The Best of the Runaways (2005) (remaining tracks); The Mercury Albums Anthology (2010) (remaining tracks); Live in New York 1978 (2017)
	Laurie McAllister	1978–1979 (died 2011)	bass	And Now Tour 1978 (2019)

=== Session musicians ===
Image	Name	Years active	Instruments	Release contributions
	Mark Andes	1975	bass	Cherokee Studios Demos (2024)
	Nigel Harrison	1976	bass	The Runaways (1976)
	Rodney Bingenheimer	1976	orchestration	The Runaways (1976)
	Duane Hitchings	1978	keyboards	And Now... The Runaways (1978)

=== Lineups ===
Period	Members	Releases
July — August 1975	Joan Jett – guitar; Sandy West – drums; Kari Krome — vocals	none
August — October 1975	Joan Jett – guitar, backing vocals; Sandy West – drums, backing vocals; Micki Steele — bass, lead vocals	Born to be Bad (1993)
October 1975	Joan Jett – guitar, lead vocals; Sandy West – drums, backing vocals; Micki Steele — lead vocals; Guest appearance: Mark Andes – bass	Cherokee Studios Demos (2024)
Early November 1975	Joan Jett — rhythm guitar, vocals; Sandy West – drums, backing vocals; Lita Ford – lead guitar; Peggy Foster – bass	none
November 1975	Joan Jett — rhythm guitar, lead vocals; Sandy West – drums, backing vocals; Lita Ford — lead guitar; Peggy Foster – bass; Cherie Currie – lead vocals	none
December 1975 — January 1976 (classic lineup)	Joan Jett — rhythm guitar, lead vocals; Sandy West – drums, backing vocals; Lita Ford — lead guitar; Cherie Currie – lead vocals; Jackie Fox – bass, backing vocals	none
Early February 1976	Joan Jett — rhythm guitar, lead vocals; Sandy West – drums, backing vocals; Lita Ford — lead guitar; Cherie Currie – lead vocals; Jackie Fox – bass (credit only); Guest appearances: Nigel Harrison – bass; Rodney Bingenheimer — orchestration	The Runaways (1976)
February — October 1976 (classic lineup)	Joan Jett — rhythm guitar, lead vocals; Sandy West – drums, backing vocals; Lita Ford — lead guitar; Cherie Currie – lead vocals; Jackie Fox – bass, backing vocals	Flaming Schoolgirls (1980); The Best of the Runaways (1982); Live (Agora Ballroom, Cleveland - July 19, 1976) (2015)
October 1976	Joan Jett — guitar, lead vocals; Sandy West – drums, backing vocals; Cherie Currie – lead vocals; Jackie Fox – bass, backing vocals	none
November 1976 — June 1977 (classic lineup)	Joan Jett — rhythm guitar, lead vocals; Sandy West – drums, backing vocals; Lita Ford — lead guitar, backing vocals (from 1977); Jackie Fox – bass, backing vocals; Cherie Currie – lead vocals	Queens of Noise (1977); Live in Japan (1977); Flaming Schoolgirls (1980)
June — July 1977	Lita Ford — guitar, backing vocals; Sandy West – drums, backing vocals; Joan Jett — bass, lead vocals; Cherie Currie – lead vocals	none
July — August 1977	Joan Jett — rhythm guitar, lead vocals; Sandy West – drums, backing vocals; Lita Ford — lead guitar, backing vocals; Cherie Currie – lead vocals; Vicki Blue — bass, backing vocals	none
August 1977 — October 1978	Joan Jett — rhythm guitar, lead vocals; Sandy West – drums, backing vocals; Lita Ford — lead guitar, backing vocals; Vicki Blue — bass, backing vocals	Waitin' for the Night (1977); Little Lost Girls (1981); I Love Playin' with Fire (1982); Live in New York 1978 (2017)
October 1978	Joan Jett — rhythm guitar, lead vocals; Sandy West – drums, backing vocals; Lita Ford — lead guitar, bass, backing vocals; Guest appearance: Duane Hitchings — keyboards	And Now... The Runaways (1978)
November 1978 — January 1979	Joan Jett — rhythm guitar, lead vocals; Sandy West – drums, backing vocals; Lita Ford — lead guitar, backing vocals; Laurie McAllister — bass	And Now Live Tour 1978 (2019)
Band was officially disbanded April 1979

== Discography ==
=== Studio albums ===
Title	Album details	Peak chart positions				
Title	Album details	US	AUS	CAN	JPN	SWE
The Runaways	Released: May 17, 1976; Label: Mercury	194	31	—	7	—
Queens of Noise	Released: January 7, 1977; Label: Mercury	172	36	83	30	28
Waitin' for the Night	Released: October 17, 1977; Label: Mercury	—	—	—	—	34
And Now... The Runaways	Released: November 1978 (Netherlands); Label: Mercury	—	—	—	—	—
"—" denotes a recording that did not chart or was not released in that territory.

=== Live albums ===
Title	Album details	Peak chart positions
Title	Album details	SWE
Live in Japan	Released: October 1977; Label: Mercury	33
Live (Agora Ballroom, Cleveland - July 19, 1976)	Released: April 21, 2015; Label: Vinyl Lovers	—
Live in New York 1978	Released: September 22, 2017; Label: Air Cuts	—
And Now USA Tour 1978	Released: 2019; Label: Phoenix	–
"—" denotes a recording that did not chart or was not released in that territory.

=== Compilation albums ===
- Flaming Schoolgirls (1980, Cherry Red)
- The Best of the Runaways (1982, Mercury)
- I Love Playin' with Fire (1982, Cherry Red)
- Born to be Bad (1991, Marilyn)
- Neon Angels (1992, Mercury)
- The Runaways featuring Joan Jett and Lita Ford (1997, PolyGram)
- 20th Century Masters - The Millennium Collection: The Best of the Runaways (2005, Universal)
- The Mercury Albums Anthology (2010, Hip-O)
- Cherokee Studios Demos (2024)

=== Charted singles ===
Title	Year	Peak chart positions			Certifications
Title	Year	US Bub.	AUS	BEL (FL)	Certifications
"Cherry Bomb" / "Blackmail"	1976	106	57	—	BPI: Silver
"American Nights" / "Cherry Bomb"	1976	—	97	—	
"Heartbeat" / "Neon Angels on the Road to Ruin"	1977	110	—	—	
"School Days" / "Wasted"	1977	—	84	29	
"—" denotes a recording that did not chart or was not released in that territory.

== Influence ==
The Runaways' success has had a lasting effect to help pave the way for many other successful female artists and female bands, including the Bangles, the Go-Go's, Sahara Hotnights, L7, the Donnas, and Vixen to enter the male-dominated arena of rock music. They are named as influences by several artists, including the Germs, Courtney Love, the Adolescents, Taylor Momsen, White Flag, and Rhino Bucket who acknowledged the Runaways' influence on their music during their performance at the December 2006 tribute concert honoring Sandy West.

== Film ==
A biographical film about the band, inspired by Currie's memoir, was released in 2010. Jett was one of the executive producers of the film. Actresses Kristen Stewart and Dakota Fanning starred as Jett and Currie, respectively. Michael Shannon played Fowley. None of the band's former bass players were featured in the film; Fox did not want to be involved in any part of the film, and requested that her name be changed in the story. The fictional replacement is named Robin Robbins. The film was written and directed by Floria Sigismondi, and was released to limited theaters on March 19, 2010.

The Runaways received generally positive reviews from critics. On review aggregator Rotten Tomatoes, the film has a 70% rating based on 187 reviews, and an average rating of 6.19/10.

== New Runaways (1987) ==
In the early 1980s, Gayle Welch, an ambitious 13-year-old girl from Kaitaia, New Zealand, wrote a song, "Day of Age", and recorded it in Mandrell Recording Studios in Auckland, New Zealand. The resulting tape found its way to Fowley's desk. He played the Welch tape for colleague and Los Angeles deejay Rodney Bingenheimer, who played the song on his show on radio KROQ and included it on his annual compilation of his most-liked music for the year. Also on that compilation was a song that featured Chicago-native guitarist Bill Millay.

It did not take long before Fowley, who still owned the Runaways trademark, was putting together a new Runaways band built around Welch. Missy Bonilla was recruited from the typing pool of CBS Records, Denise Pryor came from Compton and Kathrine Dombrowski ("Kathy DiAmber") was also added. Welch was present only on tape and only on the first song on the CD, "I Want to Run with the Bad Boys". Millay played guitar, David Carr played keyboards and a drum machine rounded out the team. Glenn Holland, also from New Zealand, a friend of both Bingenheimer and Fowley, facilitated. The album, Young and Fast, was released in 1987, and was a minor hit.
