= Kim Fowley =

American record producer and songwriter (1939–2015)

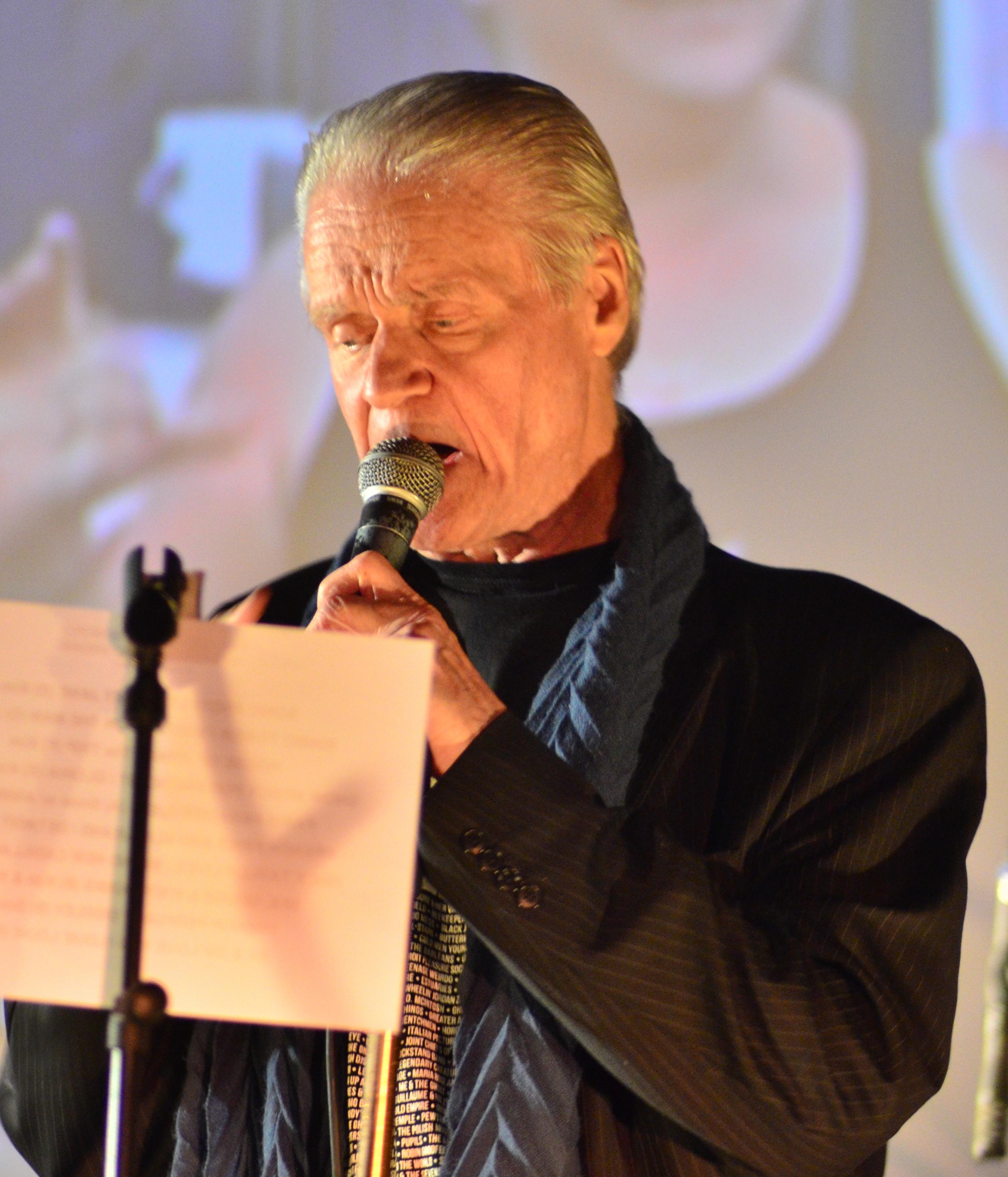
- Fowley in 2012

Background information
- Born: Kim Vincent Fowley; July 21, 1939; Los Angeles, California, U.S.
- Died: January 15, 2015 (aged 75) Los Angeles, California, U.S.
- Genres: Pop; rock; glam rock; psychedelia
- Occupations: Record producer; songwriter; musician; impresario
- Years active: 1959–2015
- Website: kimfowley.com

Kim Vincent Fowley (July 21, 1939 – January 15, 2015) was an American record producer, songwriter, and musician who was behind a string of novelty and cult pop rock singles in the 1960s, and managed the Runaways in the 1970s. He has been described as "one of the most colorful characters in the annals of rock & roll", as well as "a shadowy cult figure well outside the margins of the mainstream".

== Early life ==
Kim Vincent Fowley was born on July 21, 1939, in Los Angeles, California, Fowley was the son of character actor Douglas Fowley and actress Shelby Payne. His parents later divorced and Payne married William Friml, son of composer Rudolf Friml. Fowley attended University High School.

== Career ==
In 1957, he was hospitalized with polio and, upon his release, became manager and publicist for the local band the Sleepwalkers, which included Bruce Johnston, drummer Sandy Nelson, and occasionally Phil Spector.

He spent some time in the armed forces and, by his own account, worked in the sex industry in Los Angeles in the late 1950s.

In 1959, he began working in the music industry in various capacities for both Alan Freed and Berry Gordy. His first record as a producer was "Charge" by the Renegades, a group comprising Johnston, Nelson, Nik Venet, and Richard Podolor. He promoted records for the duo Skip & Flip (Skip Battin and Gary S. Paxton), including the No. 11 hit "Cherry Pie".

=== 1960s ===
During the early 1960s, Fowley was involved as co-producer/co-publisher with a string of successful records produced in Los Angeles. With Gary S. Paxton he recorded the novelty song "Alley Oop", which reached No. 1 on the charts in 1960 and was credited to the non-existent group the Hollywood Argyles. In 1961 he co-produced the instrumental "Like, Long Hair", arranged by Paxton, which became a No. 38 hit for Paul Revere and the Raiders. He arranged "Nut Rocker" for B. Bumble and the Stingers, which became a No. 1 hit in the UK in 1962 and talent scouted "Papa-Oom-Mow-Mow", a No. 48 hit for the Rivingtons. The following year he produced "Popsicles and Icicles" by the Murmaids, which reached No. 3 in the charts in 1963 and which was written by a pre-Bread David Gates, then a session musician and songwriter who had met Fowley while Kim was hitchhiking in Los Angeles.

During the mid-1960s, Fowley publicized/consulted singer P.J. Proby and relocated for a time to London, England. Fowley wrote the lyrics for the song "Portobello Road", the B-side of Cat Stevens' first single, "I Love My Dog". He produced a Them spin-off band led by two ex-Them members, brothers Pat and Jackie McAuley (who were only allowed to use the band name Other Them in the UK, but called themselves Them on the European continent, releasing an album called Them Belfast Gypsies and a single "Let's Freak Out" under the name Freaks of Nature); an early incarnation of Slade known as the N'Betweens; Soft Machine (he produced "Love Makes Sweet Music", their first single); and the Lancasters, an instrumental rock group featuring a young Ritchie Blackmore. He worked with an up-and-coming band, the Farinas, and renamed them "Family".

In London around 1967 Fowley collaborated with the Seekers' guitarist/arranger Keith Potger. Together (with Potger writing under the nom de plume John Martin) they wrote the lyrics to "Emerald City". Potger has said the song was originally quite unlike the eventual Seekers single, and he heavily "Seeker-ized" the arrangement before presenting it to the group. The tune was based on the "Ode To Joy" theme from Beethoven's ninth ("Choral") symphony.

Fowley worked on occasion as a recording artist in the 1960s, issuing albums such as Love Is Alive and Well. In 1965, he wrote and produced a song about the psychedelic experience, "The Trip". In 1966 Fowley and Gail Sloatman (later Gail Zappa) recorded a spoken word single as "Bunny and Bear". The record is a satire of Sonny and Cher.

With Brian Parker, Fowley co-wrote "Sea of Faces" for UK group, Unit Four Plus Two when he was living in England with P.J. Proby. The group recorded the song but it was never released. Another group, The Ways and Means who were managed by Ron Fairway recorded it and it was released on Pye 7N 17277. It became a minor hit for the band making it to no.39 on the Radio City City Sixty chart for the Sunday 1 to Sunday 8 January 1967 period, and to no. 41 on the Radio Caroline chart on the 21st.

Kim Fowley in the October 12, 1966 issue of British music magazine Record Mirror, labeled "Prince of Freak Out"

He was credited for "hypophone" on the Mothers of Invention's first album Freak Out! When asked later about this, band leader Frank Zappa said "The hypophone is his mouth, 'cause all that ever comes out of it is hype." Other singles by Fowley as a recording artist included "Animal Man" from his 1968 album Outrageous; during the song he remarks, "It's too dirty, it'll be banned". All his efforts as a solo artist since 1970 have become cult items, both in reissue and bootleg formats.

In 1968, Fowley joined forces with a young band, St John Green, from Topanga Canyon in California, to produce their only album, which contains songs, musical soundtracks, comedy and dark poetry. The band members were: Ed Bissot (bass), Bill Kirkland (guitars), Vic Sabino (vocals, harmonica and percussion), Michael 'Papabax' Baxter (keyboards, arranger), and Shelly Scott (drums). The album was engineered by Michael Lloyd. Fowley later claimed it to be "one of the great lost records...Somebody will reissue it someday and people will start crying and jacking off and smoking dope to it. It's a great record. There's only a handful of records that I've made that are great." The album was released by MGM on the Flick Disc label, but the group disbanded soon afterwards.

He is credited with being the inspiration behind promoter John Brower's call to John Lennon resulted in the last-minute appearance of the Plastic Ono Band at the Toronto Rock and Roll Revival on September 13, 1969, where Fowley was the MC. At this event, Fowley invited the audience to light matches and lighters to welcome a nervous John Lennon to the stage.

In 1969, Fowley produced the album I'm Back and I'm Proud for Gene Vincent. He co-wrote for Warren Zevon's first solo album, Wanted Dead or Alive. Fowley collaborated with his friend Skip Battin during Battin's membership as bassist with the Byrds on a number of songs which appeared on their early 1970's albums: "The Hungry Planet", "You All Look Alike", "Tunnel of Love", "Citizen Kane", "Absolute Happiness", "Precious Kate", and "America's Great National Pastime". The latter song was released as a single in late 1971. When Battin moved on to the New Riders of the Purple Sage in 1974, Fowley and Battin co-wrote five songs for the New Riders: "On the Amazon", "Big Wheels", "Singing Cowboy", "Neon Rose" and "Strangers on a Train".

=== 1970s ===
In 1970, Fowley moved to Helsinki, Finland, where he worked with the progressive rock band Wigwam, whom he called "The Finnish Beatles." Fowley produced the band's second album Tombstone Valentine, which was released in Finland on the Love Records label. The album was released as a double album in the US by Verve Forecast, with a second LP of extra tracks from the band's previous catalog. According to Fowley, he gave a copy of the LP to David Bowie, who allegedly utilized the production style of the album for his next album (1971's Hunky Dory). Fowley then moved to Sweden and produced the group Contact's album Nobody Wants to Be Sixteen for Swedish label MNW (Music Network) Records, which landed in the Swedish Top 20. MNW released the Kim Fowley solo LP The Day the Earth Stood Still the same year. Upon returning to Los Angeles, Fowley co-wrote the song "Michoacan" which was recorded by the Sir Douglas Quintet and appeared in the 1972 movie Cisco Pike starring Kris Kristofferson.

In 1971, The Byrds recorded three songs for the album Byrdmaniax that were co-written by Fowley and Byrds member Skip Battin. Fowley produced a re-recording of one of these songs, "Citizen Kane," with Battin later in the year. The re-recording featured the rest of the members of The Byrds (minus Roger McGuinn) as sidemen and was used in the soundtrack of the Edie Sedgwick film Ciao! Manhattan (1972). Signpost Records signed Battin to a solo recording contract in 1972, and the Battin/Fowley team co-wrote every song on the resultant solo album Skip Battin (aka Skip).

Fowley produced the Boulder, Colorado-based rock and roll revival act Flash Cadillac & the Continental Kids for a television appearance in early 1972. The group signed a contract with Epic Records in September of that year, and Fowley produced their self-titled debut LP for the label at Gold Star Studios in Los Angeles. Fowley also produced three recordings by Flash Cadillac & the Continental Kids that were included in the film American Graffiti (1973). These songs were "At the Hop", "She's So Fine" and "Louie Louie". The first two tracks were also featured on the film's soundtrack album.

In May 1972, Fowley was signed to Capitol Records for a long-term solo recording contract. Capitol released Fowley's LP I'm Bad in June of that year. Fowley's follow-up solo LP, International Heroes, was mixed in February and released in March 1973.

While on tour to promote his solo album I'm Bad in the summer of 1972, Fowley met Boston disk jockey Maxanne Satori, who introduced him to a pre-fame Jonathan Richman and the Modern Lovers. Fowley returned to Boston after the completion of the tour and arranged to have engineer Stuart "Dinky" Dawson record a demo with The Modern Lovers in Dawson's home studio. Later in autumn 1973, Fowley worked with the band again, this time recording them in Los Angeles at Gold Star Studios on behalf of Warner Bros. Records. Tracks from these sessions were released as bonus tracks on later issues of The Modern Lovers (1976), the album The Original Modern Lovers (1981), and the Warner Bros. Loss Leaders compilation Troublemakers (1980).

In 1973, Fowley assembled the Hollywood Stars, his first "conceptual band". Musician, songwriter and future Hollywood Stars member, Mark Anthony, was working as Fowley's chauffeur at the time. At one point, Anthony spoke to New York Dolls manager Marty Thau at a party and asked him how the New York Dolls were formed. Thau stated the members were "a bunch of broke street kids hanging around." Upon hearing this, Fowley decided to create a West Coast answer to the New York Dolls in a similar manner, taking the band name from the minor league baseball team of the same name. Upon assembling the group, Fowley rented a studio in the San Fernando Valley and put the band on a rigorous rehearsal schedule, utilizing songs written by songwriter Mars Bonfire, and by himself and producer/songwriter Peter Lion. The band played an invitation-only concert at Studio Instrument Rentals in Hollywood, which brought a crowd of 380 people, including representatives of the labels Liberty Records, A&M Records and Columbia Records. A&M and Columbia began bidding against each other to sign the band. Columbia signed The Hollywood Stars on March 28, 1974, and Bill Szymczyk was brought in to produce the band's debut album, which was recorded at The Record Plant over the course of 34 days. Early in the recording process, Szymczyk abandoned the project, leaving the engineer to produce the album. Soon afterward, Columbia dismissed The Hollywood Stars' A&R representative in an internal staffing change, decided not to release the album and dropped the group from the label. Despite the band's local popularity, internal tensions and industry stigma from the failure of the Columbia Records deal led to the decision to break up the band. The group played their final performance headlining the Whisky a Go Go on November 10, 1974.

In December 1973, Fowley connected the Hollywood Stars with producer Bob Ezrin, who worked with the band on arrangements for their song "Escape", which was co-written by Fowley and Hollywood Stars member Mark Anthony. Although Ezrin initially passed on working with the band further, he expressed interest in utilizing two of their songs. Just before the band's breakup in 1974, Fowley went back to Bob Ezrin and offered him usage of the two songs. Ezrin then took "Escape" to Alice Cooper, who made changes to the lyrics and included the song on Welcome to My Nightmare (1975). Similarly, Ezrin took "King of the Night Time World" (also co-written by Fowley and Anthony) to Kiss, who altered the lyrics slightly and recorded the song for the album Destroyer (1976). Ezrin also asked Fowley to write lyrics for "Do You Love Me?," another song that was recorded for Kiss' Destroyer LP. Fowley worked on the lyrics for the latter song in 1975 while assembling the band The Runaways with Joan Jett.

Fowley produced and wrote songs for the Helen Reddy albums Ear Candy (1977) and We'll Sing in the Sunshine (1978). He also co-wrote songs with Leon Russell during this period.

In 1978, Fowley formed the Orchids, another all-female rock band, with Laurie McAllister, the last bassist from The Runaways, and Sandy Fury, a 13-year-old rock prodigy on rhythm guitar and vocals.

In 1979, Fowley signed new artists, such as Tommy Rock, the Popsicles, and the Orchids. Fowley promoted "Kim Fowley Night" featuring these bands at the Whisky a Go Go. Fowley brought Stiv Bators & the Dead Boys, the Popsicles, and the Orchids into Leon Russell's Cherokee Recording Studio in Hollywood to record "LA, LA (I'm on a Hollywood High)". Also in 1979, Fowley produced the five man group Streettalk at Mandrill Studios in Auckland, New Zealand.

==== The Runaways 1975–1978 ====
Fowley had an idea for assembling an all-female rock band in a time when, according to guitarist Joan Jett, "there were no young girls at all playing guitar or any sort of instruments." In early 1975, Fowley met songwriter Kari Krome at a party held for Alice Cooper, put her on salary, and had her begin looking for female performers. Krome met Jett and brought her to Fowley. Jett successfully auditioned for Fowley by playing ukulele to a Sweet album, and picked up rhythm guitar as her instrument. Soon afterward, Fowley met Sandy West in the parking lot of the Rainbow Bar and Grill, who agreed to play drums. Fowley had Jett rehearse with West at the latter's home in Huntington Beach, and auditioned the pair on the telephone to music journalist Ritchie Yorke. He then turned to two radio stations to advertise for further auditions, which brought bassist Micki Steele (later of The Bangles) and guitarist Lita Ford to the group. Steele left due to creative differences, and was replaced by Jackie Fox, whom Fowley colleague Rodney Bingenheimer found in the parking lot of the West Hollywood nightclub the Starwood. Just before adding Fox, Fowley and Jett discovered Cherie Currie at the teen nightclub The Sugar Shack and brought her in as lead vocalist for the group.

Fowley touted the new group The Runaways as "an all girl answer to Grand Funk," and the band signed to Kim Fowley Productions for management in September 1975. The lineup of Jett, West, and Steele made its live debut at the Whisky a Go Go September 28–29, opening for the newly reformed Hollywood Stars.

Phonogram/Mercury Records' West Coast director of A&R Denny Rosencrantz agreed to sign The Runaways on December 12, 1975. The band finished their debut album The Runaways in May 1976. The album is listed as "Produced and directed by Kim Fowley", and gives Fowley arrangement and numerous songwriting credits. Mercury released the album in June 1976 to an initial position of No. 188 on the Cash Box top albums chart, favorable reviews, and numerous radio and album adds, as well as sales of 70,000 units.

The Runaways were the subject of a writeup in People magazine in September 1976. A week later, Fowley severed his ties with the band, and forfeited his rights, titles, claims and merchandising ownership to Mercury Records. Mercury refused to accept Fowley's stakehold in the band and turned it back to him the following week. Fowley and the band reconciled in November, and returned to the studio to record their followup album Queens of Noise. The album was released in December 1976, was co-produced by Fowley and Earle Mankey, and again co-credited Fowley for arrangements and songwriting.

In June 1977, The Runaways toured Japan, recording the album Live in Japan while on the tour. Live in Japan included several songs written by Fowley. Jackie Fox left mid-tour and was replaced by bassist Vicki Blue when the group returned to America. While the band was still a five-piece and with Blue as a new member, Fowley had the band learn the Arrows song "I Love Rock 'n' Roll," which would go on to be an international number one hit for Joan Jett and the Blackhearts in 1982.

Cherie Currie left the band in August 1977. Fowley recorded The Runaways' third LP, Waitin' for the Night, at Larrabee Studios the same month, with the band as a four-piece and with Joan Jett on vocals.

Cherie Currie contractually owed an album to Fowley's management, so just a few weeks after leaving The Runaways, she went into Larrabee Studios to record her debut solo album Beauty's Only Skin Deep, with Fowley co-producing. The album featured Currie going in an MOR direction, which Fowley chose in order to play on Currie's liking for mellower music. Fowley co-wrote "Beauty's Only Skin Deep", "Science Fiction Daze" and "Young and Wild". One song on the album, "Love at First Sight", featured Cherie's twin sister Marie Currie on harmony vocals. Fowley sent conflicting stories to Japan about whether or not Cherie did indeed have a twin sister who sang on the track, creating a frenzy of interest when Cherie and Marie arrived to Japan for a two-week tour to support the album. The album was released in 1978 to Japan and to Europe but was not released in the United States.

In October 1977, Fowley and Joan Jett appeared on an episode of The Tomorrow Show hosted by Tom Snyder. The show aired October 11, and was dedicated to the topic of punk rock. While on the show, Snyder mentioned Fowley will be "quitting [working with Jett] in 48 hours," which Fowley affirmed as correct. In a feature on the Runaways dated November 12, 1977, Sounds magazine writer Sandy Robertson confirmed "Kim Fowley will no longer be producing The Runaways, the new album Waiting For The Night [sic] being his last work with them."

The Runaways' Waitin' For the Night was released in October 1977. The album is listed as "Produced and directed by Kim Fowley", with the tracks "Wasted", "School Days" and "Waitin' for the Night" written by Fowley.

In February 1978, a spokesman for Fowley corrected information stating Fowley had exited The Runaways as producer, claiming to the contrary that Fowley was still with the group and "to be considered its producer of record". The Runaways signed with American Entertainment Management for personal management the following month. Fowley followed this up with the publication of several legal notices claiming ownership of "The Runaways" service mark, recording authorization, and merchandising rights.

=== 1980s ===
In the 1980s Fowley moved to Australia where he announced he was "looking for the new Beatles or ABBA". His search turned up power pop band Beathoven who were still under a recording contract with EMI. Changing their name to the Innocents, he secured a new record deal with Trafalgar Records and produced several songs for the group. They too became a cult band in later bootlegs/reissues. Fowley produced the first demos for the iconic power pop band, Candy, which featured Gilby Clarke and Kyle Vincent. Vincent was Fowley's personal assistant. Producer Fowley and attorney David Chatfield recorded the first album for Steel Breeze at Rusk studios in Hollywood and got Steel Breeze their recording contract with RCA. Casey Kasem, on the edition of March 12, 1983, of American Top 40, describes how Fowley discovered Steel Breeze while going through approximately 1200 demo tapes that were about to be discarded by a local Hollywood nightclub, Madame Wong's. "You Don't Want Me Anymore" was the first single from the band's self-titled album and quickly jumped into the Top 20 on the Billboard Hot 100 supported by a video that was a favorite of early MTV, and peaked at No. 16. The next single, "Dreamin' Is Easy", also made it into the Top 40.

In 1984, still owning rights to the name "the Runaways", Fowley rebuilt the image around Gayle Welch, an unknown teenager from New Zealand. Adding Denise Prior, Missy Bonilla (then a typist for Denny Diante at what was CBS Records) and Cathy DiAmber (Catherine Dombrowski) with David Carr on keyboards, a Chicago guitarist Bill Millay and numerous session musicians. Fowley, assisted by New Zealander Glenn Holland, sought to cash in on the fame of the former Runaways members who had gone on to significant success in their individual solo careers. In 1985, he returned to the United States and recorded further songs with the Innocents' David Minchin.

In 1986, Fowley spotted the band Shanghai (consisting of Eric Leach and Taz Rudd of Symbol Six, Brent Muscat of Faster Pussycat, Patrick Muzingo, and Todd Muscat of Decry) at the Troubadour. After seeing their performance he asked, "Are you ready to make a record?!" They immediately moved in with Fowley and began writing and recording songs. David Libert, Alice Cooper's ex-road manager and agent for George Clinton and Parliament Funkadelic, was recruited to come in to handle the day-to-day babysitting chores. Shanghai played the reopening of the Whisky a Go Go in April 1986 with Guns N' Roses and Faster Pussycat. Their last show was at the Scream in Los Angeles in 1987.

=== 2000s ===
Fowley is featured in Mayor of the Sunset Strip, a 2003 documentary about the disc jockey Rodney Bingenheimer.

Also in 2003, Fowley made a return trip to London, where he made an in-store appearance at Intoxica Records on Portobello Road and curated and performed an evening of music and entertainment at the Dirty Water Club at its then base at the Boston Music Room in North London.

Fowley became an experimental filmmaker after the DVD release of Mayor of the Sunset Strip. His written and directed works include: Black Room Doom, Dollboy: The Movie, Satan of Silverlake, The Golden Road to Nowhere, Frankenstein Goes Surfing, Trailer Park's On Fire and Jukebox California. Video clips/scenes from these movies can be seen on YouTube and Myspace, and feature a cast of regulars including but not limited to musical oddities such as the Fabulous Miss Wendy, Giddle Partridge, Richard Rogers (Crazy White Man) and Clown Porn Queen Hollie Stevens.

Fowley released the 21-track solo album Adventures in Dreamland on WEED/Innerstate Records in 2004. It contains the songs "Mayor of the Sunset Strip", "Terrors in Tinseltown", and "Ballad of Phil Spector".

In 2008, Fowley was reunited with Cherie Currie at Harry Houdini's mansion in Los Angeles. He played three dozen gigs between June 2007 and February 2009 as the act Crazy White Man, a duo featuring him on vocals and Richard Rogers on guitar. The bulk of the Crazy White Man shows took place during 2008 and included the Tribute to Gidget Gein, which raised funds for Gidget's Hollywood Forever memorial.

Capitol re-released several of his titles, and director Guy Ritchie used his song "The Trip" in the 2008 film RocknRolla. Fowley was regularly heard on Sirius Satellite Radio with a four-hour show on Saturdays and Sundays.

Currie wrote a memoir of her time in the Runaways, which was turned into the film, The Runaways, released on March 19, 2010. The film featured Michael Shannon as Fowley, alongside Kristen Stewart as Jett and Dakota Fanning as Currie.

In 2012, Fowley won the Special Jury Prize at the 13th Melbourne Underground Film Festival for his two feature projects – Golden Road to Nowhere and Black Room Doom.

=== 2010s ===
In his last years, Fowley worked on writing and publishing his autobiography, which he divided between three distinct books. He released the first volume of his autobiography, Lord of Garbage, published by Kicks Books, in 2012. It covers the years 1939–1969 and describes his early childhood and beginning years in the music business. The second volume of his autobiography was intended to be called Planet Pain and to cover the years 1970–1994. The last volume was intended to be finished on his deathbed and to be released posthumously because, as the 2010s began, Fowley was terminally ill. On September 24, 2014, Fowley married longtime girlfriend and music executive Kara Wright-Fowley, in a private ceremony in Los Angeles.

== Death ==
Fowley died of bladder cancer in Hollywood, California on January 15, 2015, at the age of 75. He is interred at Hollywood Forever Cemetery.

== Sexual misconduct allegations ==
In a 2001 interview, Michael Steele of the Bangles claimed Fowley fired her from the Runaways for refusing his sexual advances.

In July 2015, six months after Fowley's death, Jackie Fuchs (who performed under the stage name Jackie Fox with the Runaways) claimed Fowley had raped her in 1975 during a New Year's Eve party while he was involved with the band. Fox also alleged Joan Jett and Cherie Currie witnessed the rape. Jett denied seeing the incident, but songwriter Kari Krome, along with other bystanders who did not intervene, corroborated the allegation. Currie stated she spoke up and then stormed out of the room. Look Away (2021), a documentary about sexual abuse in the rock music industry, features Fuchs' story.

In 2023, Kari Krome filed a lawsuit against Fowley's estate alleging he had repeatedly sexually assaulted her when she was 14 or 15 years old.

== Selected discography ==
Solo work

- 1967 Love Is Alive and Well
- 1968 Born to Be Wild
- 1968 Outrageous
- 1969 Good Clean Fun
- 1970 The Day the Earth Stood Still
- 1972 I'm Bad
- 1973 International Heroes
- 1974 Automatic
- 1975 Animal God of the Streets
- 1978 Living in the Streets
- 1978 Sunset Boulevard
- 1979 Snake Document Masquerade
- 1981 Son of Frankenstein
- 1984 Frankenstein and the All-Star Monster Band
- 1993 White Negroes in Deutschland
- 1994 Hotel Insomnia
- 1995 Bad News From The Underworld
- 1995 Mondo Hollywood
- 1995 Kings of Saturday Night (with Ben Vaughn)
- 1995 Let the Madness In
- 1996 Worm Culture
- 1997 Michigan Babylon
- 1997 Hidden Agenda at the 13th Note (with BMX Bandits)
- 1998 The Trip of a Lifetime
- 1999 Sex, Cars and God
- 2003 Fantasy World
- 2004 Strange Plantations
- 2004 Adventures in Dreamland
- 2013 Wildfire – The Complete Imperial Recordings 1968–69

Producer or writer

- 1959 The Renegades: "Charge b/w Geronimo"
- 1960 The Hollywood Argyles: "Alley Oop"
- 1961 Paul Revere and the Raiders: "Like Long Hair"
- 1962 B. Bumble and the Stingers: "Nut Rocker"
- 1963 The Murmaids: "Popsicles and Icicles"
- 1964 The Hellions (featuring Dave Mason & Jim Capaldi)
- 1965 Kim Fowley – "The Trip"
- 1966 Kim Fowley: "They're Coming to Take Me Away Ha-Haaa!"
- 1967 Elf Stone: "Louisiana Teardrops"
- 1967 The Fire Escape: Psychotic Reaction
- 1967 Soft Machine: "Feelin' Reelin Squeelin" (B-side of "Love Makes Sweet Music")
- 1967 The Seekers: "Emerald City"
- 1968 The Seeds: "Falling Off the Edge of My Mind" b/w Wild Blood
- 1968 St John Green - album
- 1969 Gene Vincent: I'm Back and I'm Proud!
- 1970 Wigwam: Tombstone Valentine
- 1971 Scorpion (Swedish Band) – Album
- 1972 The Modern Lovers: Some tracks included on 1981 album The Original Modern Lovers and on later CD reissues of The Modern Lovers
- 1973 American Graffiti Soundtrack – At the Hop, Louie Louie, & She's So Fine
- 1974 Wide World of Entertainment (ABC) – Music for Desi Arnaz, Jr. Special
- 1975 Blue Cheer: "America Nights" and "Fighting Star"
- 1975 Alice Cooper – Welcome to My Nightmare: "Escape"
- 1976 Kiss - Destroyer: "King of the Night Time World" and "Do You Love Me?"
- 1976 The Runaways: The Runaways
- 1977 The Runaways: Queens of Noise
- 1977 The Runaways: Waitin' for the Night
- 1977 Helen Reddy: Ear Candy
- 1977 The Quick: Mondo Deco
- 1977 Vicky Leandros: Vicky Leandros
- 1977 Venus and the Razorblades: Songs from the Sunshine Jungle
- 1978 Dyan Diamond: In the Dark
- 1979 Vampires from Album Space: Album
- 1980 The Orchids: The Orchids
- 1981 Jon and the Nightriders California Fun (single - producer)
- 1981 Hollywood Confidential: Compilation (LP) and iTunes
- 1982 Steel Breeze: Steel Breeze
- 1986 London (band): Don't Cry Wolf (LP - producer)
- 1986 Child'ƨ Play: Ruff House [EP]
- 1987 Agent X – Rock n Roll Angels (Demon Doll Records)
- 1988 Leather Nun: International Heroes
- 1996 Blowtorch - Automotivation (producer)
- 1999 Underground Animal: Compilation (LP and CD) Dionysus Records/Bacchus Archives
- 2003 Impossible but True – The Kim Fowley Story: Various artists (Ace Records)
- 2009 Kim Fowley – "Another Man's Gold"; "Lost Treasures from the Vaults 1959–69 Volume Two"
- 2011 – Next Year Fails : "Timaras Bitchn"
- 2011 With John York: "West Coast Revelation" (GRA Records)
- 2012 The Fabulous Miss Wendy: "No One Can Stop Me"
- 2014 Ariel Pink: pom pom

== Bibliography ==
- Fowley, Kim (2012). Lord of Garbage. New York: Kicks Books. ISBN 978-0965977760.
