= Reverie =

Reverie may refer to:

- A daydream or a dreamy state.
- W. R. Bion's psychoanalytic use of "reverie"

== Places ==
- Reverie, Tennessee, an unincorporated community in Tipton County, Tennessee, United States
- Reverie (Marion, Alabama), a Greek Revival mansion in Marion, Alabama, United States

== Music ==
- Rêverie, an 1847 work for violin and piano (part of Op. 22) by Vieuxtemps
- Rêverie (Russian: Дума), an 1865 piano work by Mussorgsky
- Rêverie by Giovanni Bottesini, c. 1870
- Rêverie (Debussy), a piano piece by Debussy, c. 1895
- Rêverie (Scriabin) (Russian: Мечты) in E minor, Op. 24, an 1898 orchestral work by Scriabin
- Rêverie, Op. 49/3, a 1905 piece for piano by Scriabin
- Reverie on El cant dels ocells, a 1939 cello piece by Pablo Casals after a folk song
- Reverie, a piano piece by Billy Joel
- Rêverie, Op.24, a Horn solo by Aleksandr Glazunov
- Dumka (Reverie), an 1840 song by Chopin
- Rêverie, an art song by Reynaldo Hahn, c. 1870

=== Albums ===
- Reverie (Cherie Currie album), 2015
- Reverie (Joe Henry album), 2011
- Reverie (Ben Platt album), 2021
- Reverie (Rafael Anton Irisarri album), 2010
- Reverie (Tinashe album), 2012
- Reverie (EP), 1982 extended play by The Triffids
- Rêveries, 1979 album by Richard Clayderman
- Rêverie, album by Luciano Supervielle 2011

=== Songs ===
- "Reverie", a song by Arca from Arca
- "Reverie", a song by Chaz Jankel from Chas Jankel
- "Reverie", a song by Design the Skyline from Nevaeh
- "Reverie", a song by Elton John from A Single Man
- "Reverie", a song by Lacuna Coil from In a Reverie
- "Rêverie", a song by Ludovico Einaudi from Nightbook
- "Reverie", a song by Opeth from Ghost Reveries
- "Reverie", a song by Protest the Hero from Palimpsest
- "La Reverie", a song by Sarah Vaughan from After Hours
- "Reverie", a song by the band Whirr from the album, Pipe Dreams
- "Reverie", a song by the band Sahara Hotnights from the album, Love in Times of Low Expectations

== Other uses ==
- The Day Dream (Renoir) (French: La Rêverie), a painting by Pierre-Auguste Renoir
- Reverie (TV series), an American drama television series
- Reverie (video game), 2018
- The Legend of Heroes: Trails into Reverie, 2020 video game
- Reverie, 2009, first feature film shot with a DSLR (Nikon D90) by Ray Mist
- Reverie, 2008, an experimental short film by photographer Vincent Laforet
- Reverie, a color lithograph piece of art nouveau work, done by Alphonse Mucha in 1896
