= Young and Wild =

Young and Wild may refer to:

- Young and Wild (1958 film), a 1958 American crime film
- Young and Wild (album), a 1998 album by Cherie & Marie Currie
- "Young and Wild" (song), a 2015 song by the Zac Brown Band
- Young & Wild (2012 film), a 2012 Chilean comedy-drama film
