= I Will Still Love You =

I Will Still Love You may refer to:

- "I Will Still Love You", a song by Britney Spears from ...Baby One More Time
- "I Will Still Love You", a song by Cherie Currie from Beauty's Only Skin Deep
- "I Will Still Love You", a song by Freestyle
- "I Will Still Love You", a song by Stonebolt
- "Phir Bhi Tumko Chaahunga" (transl. I Will Still Love You), a song by Mithoon from the film Half Girlfriend

== See also ==
- I Will Always Love You
