= Reverie (Cherie Currie album) =

Studio album by Cherie Currie
- Released: March 16, 2015
- Recorded: 2014, 2015
- Genre: rock, hard rock, alternative rock
- Label: self release
- Producer: Jake Hays, Kim Fowley

Cherie Currie chronology
The 80's Collection (Cherie Currie/Cherie & Marie Currie) (1999)	Reverie (2015)

Reverie is the third full-length studio album by Cherie Currie. Released on iTunes March 16, 2015. Cherie released the CD version of this album June 5, 2015 on her eBay page cheriecurriedirect, 35 years after her previous full-length studio album, 1980's Messin' with the Boys (with her sister Marie Currie).

This was the final studio album produced by Kim Fowley before his death in 2015. Cherie and Fowley had long been estranged over disputes about royalty payments when he managed her group The Runaways, but they reconciled as he suffered for several years with cancer. After Fowley's death Cherie's son Jake Hays finished production for the album.

Lita Ford, Cherie's former bandmate in Runaways bandmate, sang two Runaways songs as duets for Reverie. Cherie also recorded a duet with her son, Jake Hays, "Shades of Me".

== Reception ==
RockRevolt Magazine wrote "Overall, I was surprised by this album for more reasons than one. Currie’s vocals are pretty damn strong on this album and a thing of beauty in their delivery of emotion and conviction on many of the tracks. She started out at the age of fifteen with no vocal training and even admits that she doesn’t sing a lot today, but you would never know it. She shows a lot of range and depth on this album that I am sure will surprise quite a few people."

== Track listing ==
1. "Reverie" (Jake Hays, Cherie Currie) - 3:47
2. "Inner You" (Kim Fowley, Jake Hays, Cherie Currie) - 4:13
3. "Is It Day or Night" (Kim Fowley) - 2:33
4. "Shades of Me" (Jake Hays, Cherie Currie) - 4:51
5. "Queen of the Asphalt Jungle" (Kim Fowley, Jake Hays, Cherie Currie) - 3:44
6. "American Nights" (Kim Fowley) - 3:24
7. "Dark World" (Kim Fowley, Jake Hays, Cherie Currie) - 3:52
8. "Believe" (Cherie Currie, Jake Hays) - 4:01
9. "I'm Happy" (Kim Fowley, Cliff Retallick, Cherie Currie) - 3:04
10. "Another Dream" (Cherie Currie, Jake Hays) - 4:55

== Personnel ==
- Cherie Currie - vocals, handclaps
- Jake Hays - guitar, drums, percussion, bass, keyboards, strings, hand claps, lead vocals on "Shades of Me"
- Lita Ford - background vocals on Dark World, lead vocals on "Is It Day or Night" and "American Nights"
- Nick Maybury - guitars
- Grant Fitzpatrick - bass
- Cliff Retallick - piano, keyboards, background vocals
- Elizabeth Aston - background vocals
- Mike Wolf - violin
- Mitch Perry - slide guitar
- Patrick Golenberg - background vocals
- Nick Bral - background vocals
- Mickey Miller - guitars, background vocals, percussion
- Jonathan Barrick Griffiths - orchestra arraignment, French horn,

== Production ==
- Producer: Jake Hays
- Assistant producer: Kim Fowley
- Engineered by Mike Wolf
- Mixed and Mastered by Brant Biles
