= Leif Segerstam =

Finnish conductor and composer (1944–2024)

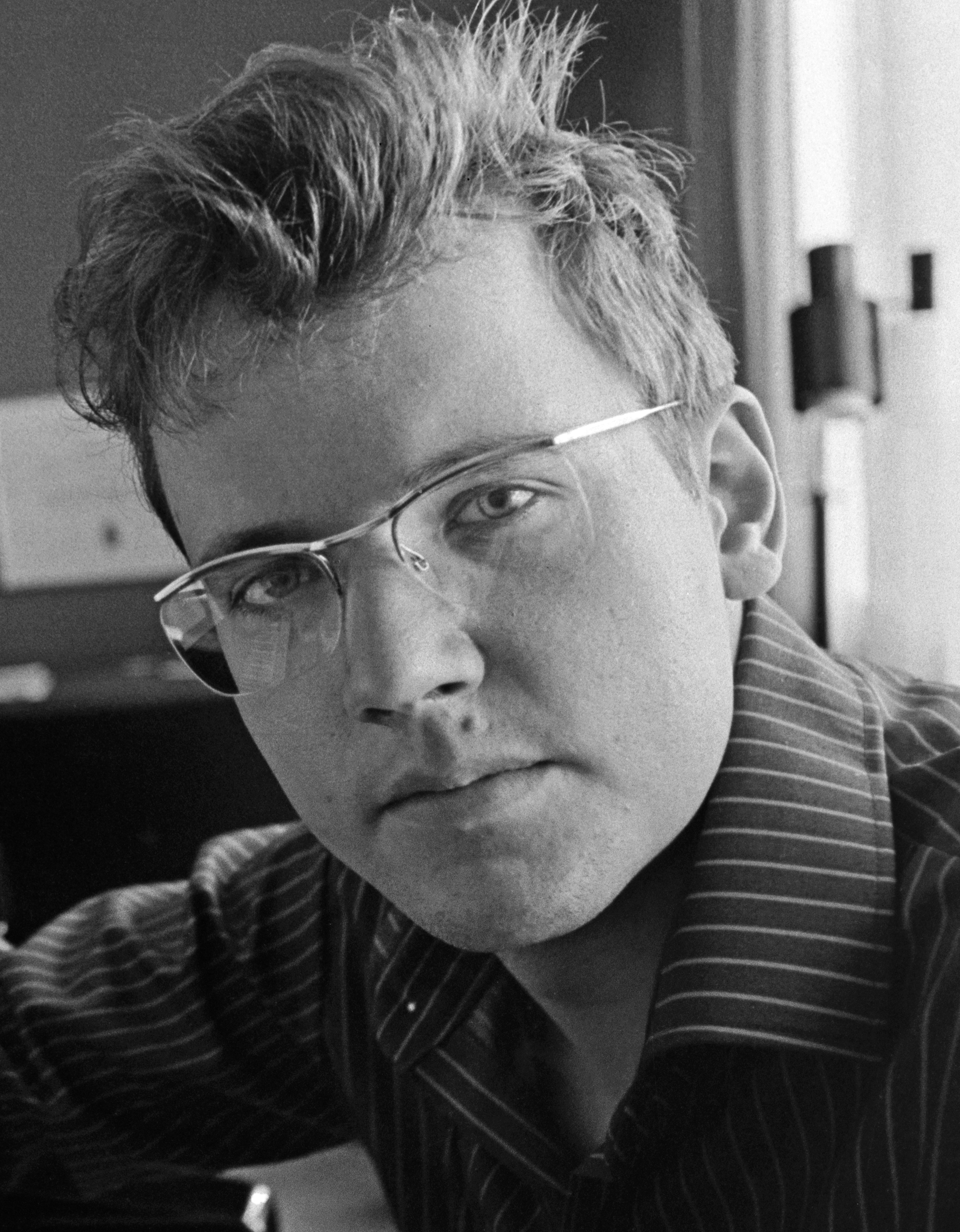
- Segerstam in 1967
- Born: Leif Selim Segerstam; 2 March 1944; Vaasa, Finland
- Died: 9 October 2024 (aged 80); Helsinki, Finland
- Education: Sibelius Academy
- Occupations: Composer; conductor; violist; violinist; pianist; professor
- Spouses: Hannele Segerstam (divorced); Minnaleena Jankko (m. 2002; div. 2009)
- Children: 5
- Father: Selim Segerstam

Leif Selim Segerstam (/ˈleɪf/ LAYF, 2 March 1944 – 9 October 2024) was a Finnish music composer, conductor, violinist, violist, and pianist. He is especially best known for writing over 300 symphonies, along with other works. He held many important positions in Finnish music industry both in Finland and around the world.

From 1963 until his death in 2024, Segerstam conducted a variety of orchestras in Finland, Europe, North America, and Australia and New Zealand. He was conductor at Finnish National Opera, Royal Swedish Opera, and Deutsche Oper Berlin, and was a chief conductor of ORF Symphony Orchestra, Staatsphilharmonie Rheinland-Pfalz, Danish National Radio Symphony, Helsinki Philharmonic Orchestra, and Turku Philharmonic Orchestra. Additionally, Segerstam taught as a professor of orchestra conducting at Sibelius Academy in Helsinki. He is remembered for his contributions to the Finnish music scene, and his vibrant personality.

== Early life ==
Leif Segerstam was born on 2 March 1944 in Vaasa, to Selim Segerstam and Viola Maria Kronqvist, into a musical Swedish-speaking family. Selim made several song books as a living. Then, Segerstams moved to Helsinki in 1947. During Leif's time at school, he played violin and viola with Helsinki Youth Orchestra.

== Career ==
Segerstam's debut concert as a violinist was in 1962, and his conducting debut was in 1963, with Rossini's The Barber of Seville, in Tampere. Following the premiere, Segerstam was hired to conduct the Finnish National Opera, and a year later he conducted the Finnish Radio Symphony Orchestra. He conducted contemporary works such as Stravinsky's Symphony of Psalms and Shostakovich's First Symphony.

Segerstam studied at the Sibelius Academy in Helsinki, piano with Jaakko Somero, violin with Leena Siukonen-Penttilä, composition with Einar Englund and Joonas Kokkonen, and conducting with Jussi Jalas. He received diplomas in violin and conducting in 1963. He studied further at the Juilliard School in New York City, violin with Louis Persinger, composition with Hall Overton and Vincent Persichetti, and conducting with Jean Morel, and received his postgraduate diploma in 1965.

Segerstam took part, as second conductor, in a 1968 tour of the Helsinki Philharmonic to the United States. He was chief conductor and music director of the Royal Swedish Opera from 1970 to 1972, and music director of the Finnish National Opera in 1973 and 1974. He began working with Deutsche Oper Berlin in the early 1970s. He conducted as a guest at the Metropolitan Opera in New York City, La Scala in Milan and the Royal Opera House in London, with a repertoire including Verdi's Aida and Don Carlo, R. Strauss' Salome and Elektra and Wagner's Tannhäuser and Der fliegende Holländer.

Segerstam served as chief conductor of the Helsinki Philharmonic Orchestra from 1995 to 2007, and held the title of Chief Conductor Emeritus with the orchestra. At the same time, he was chief conductor of the Royal Swedish Opera again and of the Savonlinna Opera Festival in Finland until 2000.

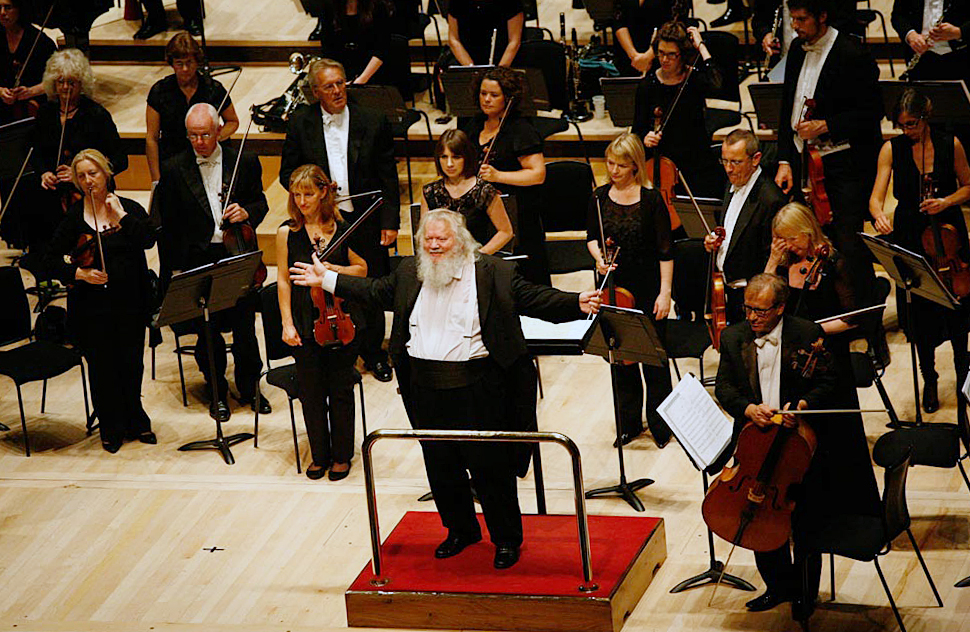
Segerstam with the Philharmonia at the 2012 Summer Olympics, 31 July 2012

He held positions with numerous other orchestras, including the ORF Symphony Orchestra (1975 to 1982), the Staatsphilharmonie Rheinland-Pfalz (1982 to 1989), the Danish National Radio Symphony (1988 to 1995), and the Turku Philharmonic Orchestra (2012 to 2019). He guest-conducted many orchestras in Europe, the Americas and in Australia, including the Vienna Philharmonic Orchestra (Salzburg Festival 1971-1975), the Chicago Symphony, the Los Angeles Philharmonic, the Toronto Symphony, the Royal Liverpool Philharmonic Orchestra, and the Symphony Orchestra of the State of São Paulo.

From autumn 1997 to spring 2013, he was professor of orchestra conducting at the Sibelius Academy in Helsinki. His students include Rune Bergmann, Susanna Mälkki, Mikk Murdvee, Sasha Mäkilä and Markku Laakso.

In 2004 he made a cameo appearance in the Finnish film Pelicanman.

On 22 December 2015, while conducting the fourth and final movement of Rimsky-Korsakov's, Scheherazade, "Festival at Baghdad. The Sea. The Ship Breaks against a Cliff Surmounted by a Bronze Horseman", around the 45 min mark, Segerstam gave his own alternative performance of the piece, and cried as if he were a pirate, while invoking members of the orchestra to do the same, to emulate the shipwreck moment in the symphonic poem's storyline.

== Compositions ==
As a composer, Segerstam is especially known for his many symphonies, which numbered 371 by March 2024.

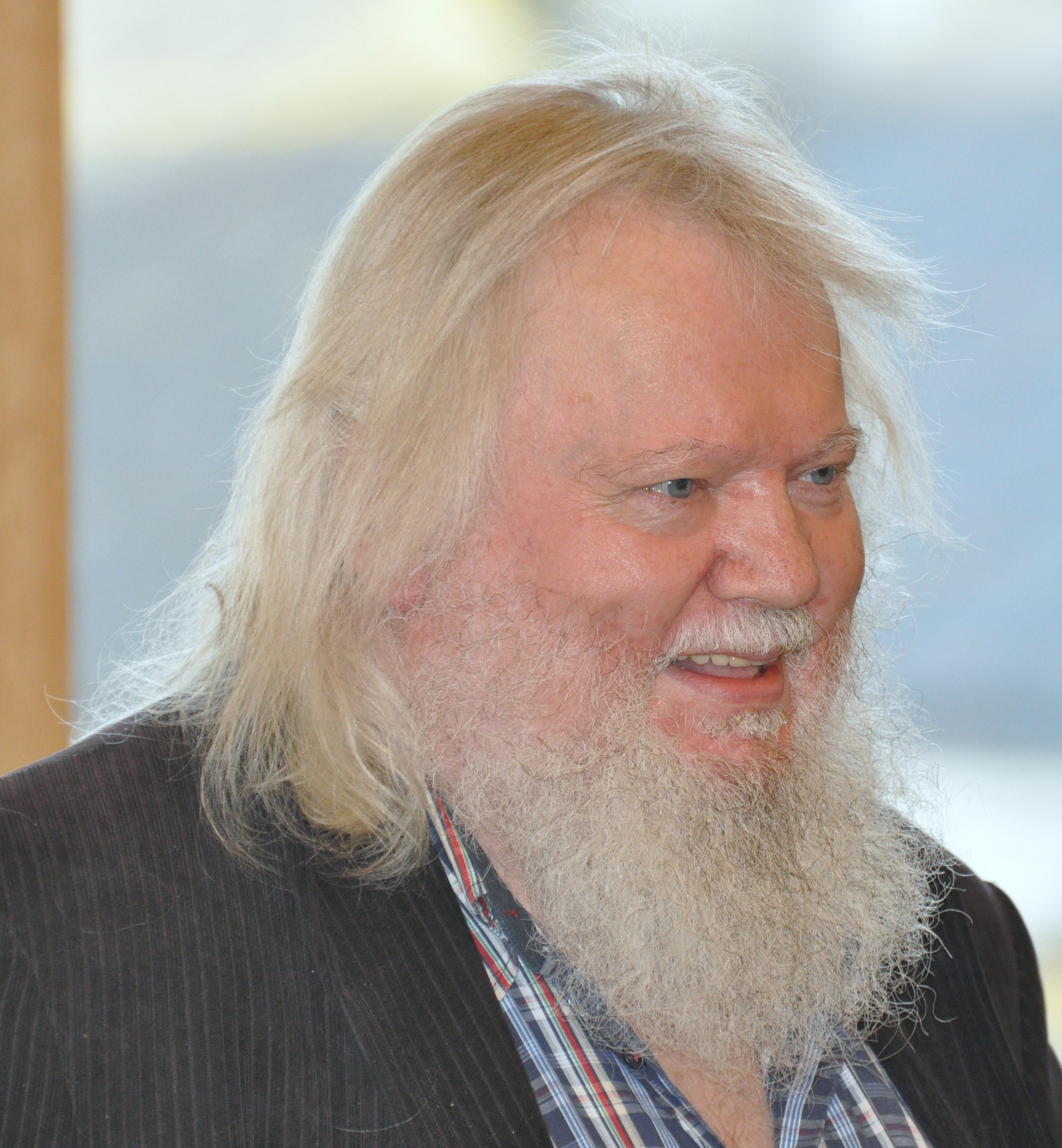
Segerstam at Turku Main Library, in 2011

Most of his symphonies last for about 20 minutes, are formed of a single movement and can be performed without a conductor. His 37th symphony, for example, at its premiere featured Segerstam at the piano, leading the orchestra "in a relatively free form". This is partially inspired by Sibelius' Seventh symphony. More than a hundred of Segerstam's symphonies have been performed.

Many of his compositions are influenced by nature, and he was often praised for his contributions to Nordic music. He developed a personal approach to aleatory composition through a style called "free pulsation" in which musical events interact flexibly in time, with his composition method persistent throughout his œuvre. His Fifth String Quartet, the "Lemming Quartet" (1970), ushered in his new chapter of post-expressionistic writing of the 1960s. This composition approach proved to be a quick way of writing large blocks of sound (the temporal order of events being left to the performer) and permitted an exceptionally prolific output. Instead of constituting individual works, his music is more like a musical stream of consciousness (under the headings of Thoughts, Episode and Orchestral Diary Sheet). It also means that there are numerous scorings of the same piece. This method was first used in the "Lemming Quartet".

Among Segerstam's juvenilia (1960–1969) are four string quartets from 1962–1966, and the post-impressionist ballet Pandora from 1967. The quartets are usually labeled as from his "Post-Expressionist" period. He composed 30 string quartets and numerous concertos, for violin, viola, cello and piano.

In 2015 Segerstam began work on an opera, Völvan, with a libretto by Elisabeth Wärnfeldt.

== Personal life ==
Segerstam was married to the violinist Hannele Segerstam, concertmaster of the Finnish RSO; they had two children.

After they divorced, he married the Helsinki Philharmonic harpist Minnaleena Jankko in 2002; they had three children. In 2009 it was announced that their marriage would end.

In a 2024 interview, Segerstam mentioned being autistic.

Segerstam died from pneumonia at a Helsinki hospital, on 9 October 2024, at the age of 80.

== Awards ==
- 1962, Segerstam won the International Maj Lind Piano Competition.
- 1999, he was awarded the Nordic Council Music Prize for his work as a "tireless champion of Scandinavian Music".
- 2003, he received Svenska Kulturfonden's Prize for Music.
- 2004, he was awarded the annual State Prize for Music in Finland.
- 2005, he was awarded the Sibelius Medal.
- 2014, the President of Finland granted Segerstam the title of Professor

== Honors ==
- Pro Finlandia medal of the Order of the Lion of Finland, 6 December 1992

== Recordings ==
Segerstam is widely known through his recordings, which include the complete symphonies of Blomdahl, Brahms, Mahler, Nielsen, Scriabin, and Sibelius, as well as many works by contemporary composers, such as the Americans John Corigliano and Christopher Rouse, the Finnish Einojuhani Rautavaara, Swedish Allan Pettersson, and the Russian Alfred Schnittke.

The following is a list of selected orchestral recordings conducted by Segerstam.

Album	Label	Year	Orchestra – artists	OCLC
Brahms: Symphony No. 1 / Segerstam.: Symphony No. 288, "Letting the FLOW go on..."	Alba	2016	Turku Philharmonic Orchestra	OCLC 1030580321
Brahms: Symphony No. 2 / Segerstam.: Symphony No. 289, "When a Cat Visited"	Alba	2018	Turku Philharmonic Orchestra	OCLC 1084272213
Brahms: Symphony No. 3 / Segerstam.: Symphony No. 294, "Songs of a UNICORN heralding ..."	Alba	2019	Turku Philharmonic Orchestra	OCLC 1057237130
Brahms: Symphony No. 4 / Segerstam.: Symphony No. 295, "ulFSöDErBlom in Memoriam ..."	Alba	2019	Turku Philharmonic Orchestra	OCLC 1137804301
Aubert: Orchestral Works – Cinéma / Feuille d'Images / Offrande / Dryade	SWR Classic Archive	1994	Staatsphilharmonie Rheinland-Pfalz	OCLC 959710455
Beethoven: König Stephan / Leonore Prohaska (excerpts)	Naxos	2020	Turku Philharmonic Orchestra; The Key Ensemble, Chorus Cathedralis Aboensis	OCLC 1155153114
Beethoven: Die Ruinen von Athen	Naxos	2020	Turku Philharmonic Orchestra; Chorus Cathedralis Aboensis	OCLC 1396202758
Borup-Jørgensen: Sommasvit / Nordisk Sommerpastorale	Dacapo	1995	Danish National Symphony Orchestra	OCLC 873449234
Langgaard: Symphony No. 1 / From the Deep	Chandos	1994	Danish National Symphony Orchestra and Choir	OCLC 815409291
Mahler: Symphonies Nos. 7 and 9	Chandos	1992	Danish National Symphony Orchestra	OCLC 874520865
Mahler: Symphony No. 3	Chandos	1991	Danish National Symphony Orchestra and Choir; Anne Gjevang, Copenhagen Boys' Choir	OCLC 1057012973
Mahler: Symphony No. 4	Alba	2020	Turku Philharmonic Orchestra	OCLC 1221007259
Mahler: Symphony No. 10 and 8	Chandos	1994	Danish National Symphony Orchestra and Choir	OCLC 908332069
Nørgård: Symphonies Nos. 4 and 5	Chandos	1997	Danish National Symphony Orchestra	OCLC 730472425
Nørgård: Symphony No. 2 / Sinfonia Austera	Chandos	1996	Danish National Symphony Orchestra	OCLC 811243631
Nørgård: Symphony No. 3 / Concerto in due tempi	Chandos	1996	Danish National Symphony Orchestra and Choir	OCLC 811243640
Pettersson: Symphonies Nos. 3 and 15	BIS	1994	Norrköping Symphony Orchestra	OCLC 705287325
Pettersson: Symphonies Nos. 7 and 11	BIS	1993	Norrköping Symphony Orchestra	OCLC 811225881
Pettersson: Symphonies Nos. 8 and 10	BIS	1998	Norrköping Symphony Orchestra	OCLC 705288109
Rautavaara: Before the Icons / A Tapestry of Life	Ondine	2010	Helsinki Philharmonic Orchestra	OCLC 767883061
Rautavaara: Garden of Spaces / Clarinet Concerto / Cantus arcticus	Ondine	2005	Helsinki Philharmonic Orchestra; Richard Stoltzman	OCLC 811335953
Rautavaara: Harp Concerto / Symphony No. 8	Ondine	2001	Helsinki Philharmonic Orchestra; Marielle Nordmann	OCLC 811336727
Rautavaara: Manhattan Trilogy / Symphony No. 3	Ondine	2008	Helsinki Philharmonic Orchestra	OCLC 315789639
Rautavaara: On the Last Frontier / Flute Concerto / Anadyomene	Ondine	1999	Helsinki Philharmonic Orchestra; Patrick Gallois	OCLC 823228832
Rautavaara: Violin Concerto / Isle of Bliss / Angels and Visitations	Ondine	1997	Helsinki Philharmonic Orchestra; Elmar Oliveira	OCLC 811336700
Rautavaara: Symphony No. 7 / Annunciations	Ondine	1996	Helsinki Philharmonic Orchestra	OCLC 900665955
Romantic Trombone Concertos	BIS	1988	Bamberger Symphoniker; Christian Lindberg	OCLC 872381464
Ruders, P.: Saaledes saae Johannes / Gong / Tundra / Symphony No. 1	Chandos	1993	Danish National Symphony Orchestra	OCLC 1120829136
Schmitt, F.: Orchestral Works – Danse d'Abisag / Habeyssée / Rêves / Symphony No. 2	SWR Classic Archive	2007	Staatsphilharmonie Rheinland-Pfalz	OCLC 959723692
Scriabin: Symphony No. 2 / Reverie / Le poeme de l'extase	BIS	1992	Royal Stockholm Philharmonic Orchestra	OCLC 705229879
Scriabin: Piano Concerto / Symphony No. 3 "Le divin poeme"	BIS	1990	Royal Stockholm Philharmonic Orchestra	OCLC 705286490
Scriabin: Symphony No. 1 / Prometheé: Le poème du feu	BIS	1991	Royal Stockholm Philharmonic Orchestra	OCLC 811239112
Sibelius: Symphony No. 1 / In memoriam	Chandos	1992	Danish National Symphony Orchestra	OCLC 906564001
Sibelius.: Symphony No. 2 / Finlandia	Chandos	1992	Danish National Symphony Orchestra	OCLC 906563893
Sibelius: Symphonies Nos. 5 and 7 / Valse triste	Chandos	1992	Danish National Symphony Orchestra	OCLC 906563946
Sibelius: Symphony No. 3 / Scenes with cranes / Tapiola	Chandos	1992	Danish National Symphony Orchestra	OCLC 906563998
Sibelius: Symphony No. 4 / The Tempest Suite No. 1	Chandos	1991	Danish National Symphony Orchestra	OCLC 906563829
Sibelius: Symphony No. 6 / Pohjola's Daughter / En saga	Chandos	1991	Danish National Symphony Orchestra	OCLC 906563833
Wagner: Tristan und Isolde	Naxos	2005	Royal Swedish Opera Orchestra and Male Chorus	OCLC 144651023

Cultural offices
Preceded by Milan Horvat	Principal Conductor, Vienna Radio Symphony Orchestra; 1975–1982	Succeeded by Lothar Zagrosek
Preceded by Okko Kamu	Principal Conductor, Finnish Radio Symphony Orchestra; 1977–1987	Succeeded by Jukka-Pekka Saraste
Preceded by Lamberto Gardelli	Principal Conductor, Danish National Symphony Orchestra; 1988–1995	Succeeded by Ulf Schirmer
Preceded by Sergiu Comissiona	Principal Conductor, Helsinki Philharmonic Orchestra; 1995–2007	Succeeded by John Storgårds
Preceded by Eri Klas	Professor of conducting, Sibelius Academy; 1997–2013	Succeeded by Atso Almila
