= Selim Segerstam =

Finnish music teacher, conductor and composer (1904–1963)

- Born: Selim Johannes Sigfrids; 9 April 1904; Socklot, Nykarleby, Grand Duchy of Finland
- Died: 2 October 1963 (aged 59); Helsinki, Finland
- Occupations: Music teacher, conductor, composer
- Known for: Vår sångbok (1952)
- Spouse: Viola Kronqvist (m. 1930)
- Children: Marianne Segerstam; Gunilla Segerstam; Leif Segerstam

Selim Johannes Segerstam (born Sigfrids; 9 April 1904 – 2 October 1963) was a Finnish music teacher, conductor and composer. He was a central figure in the cultural life of Swedish-speaking Finland from the late 1920s until his death in 1963, and is best known as the author of the school songbook Vår sångbok (1952). He was the father of conductor and composer Leif Segerstam.

== Biography ==
=== Early life ===
Selim Segerstam was born in Socklot village in Nykarleby in 1904 with the surname Sigfrids. He later changed his name to Segerstam together with his brothers Bertel and Gunnar. His parents died early from tuberculosis, and he and his siblings were taken in by sisters Amanda and Brita Nygren. In the neighbouring house lived Viola Kronqvist, who was the same age as Selim and would later become his wife.

Music became an early interest, nurtured by a collection of classical sheet music in the home and with help from the village schoolteacher. During his youth Segerstam founded the Socklot choir and recorded songs from the local oral singing tradition, which he then arranged for the choir. He also composed several works during this period, including a set of piano variations on the folk song Var är vägens mål.

=== Education ===
Segerstam trained as a teacher at the teacher training seminary in Nykarleby, where he also learned to play the piano, graduating in 1926. He then moved to Helsinki to study at the conservatory, with music theory as his main subject and a particular focus on Bach's counterpoint. He also studied at what is now the Sibelius Academy and worked in parallel as a substitute teacher at Bemböle primary school in Espoo.

=== Vaasa years (1930–1946) ===
In the summer of 1930, Selim and Viola married and settled in Vaasa, where Selim took up a position as music teacher at the city's lower primary school teacher training seminary. He also taught at Vaasa Lyceum and Vaasa Swedish Girls' School, conducted the newly founded Wasa Sångargille, and was active in Föreningen Brage. All three of the couple's children — Marianne, Gunilla and Leif — were born during the family's years in Vaasa.

During the Continuation War, Segerstam served as an observer in the anti-aircraft artillery and contracted a severe pneumonia that kept him hospitalised. When the teacher training seminary in Vaasa was closed in 1946–1947, the family moved to Helsinki.

=== Helsinki years (1947–1963) ===
In Helsinki, Segerstam was appointed music teacher at Vallgård primary school, one of the city's largest, which was filled with the large post-war cohorts of children. There he built up a programme centred on brass instruments, as part of a broader initiative in the city's primary schools in which his colleagues Emil Johnson and Egil Cederlöf took responsibility for string instruments and recorder respectively at other schools.

Alongside his teaching, Segerstam had an active organisational life. He served as vice conductor of both the Oratorio Society and Sällskapet Muntra Musikanter, was active in Föreningen Brage in Helsinki, and conducted the Töölö branch choir of the association Arbetets vänner. At the national level, he was together with John Rosas and Emil Johnson one of the key figures in the Finland-Swedish Song and Music Association (FSSMF).

=== Vår sångbok ===
The idea of a Finland-Swedish songbook for school use had been with Segerstam since his Vaasa years. The result was Vår sångbok, published in 1952, which in addition to a broad repertoire of songs contained a four-part piano arrangement for each song — adapted to the level of musical knowledge that primary school teachers of the time were expected to have. That the book reached all schools in Swedish-speaking Finland was largely due to Gösta Cavonius at the National Board of Education and Nils-Göran Engström at the School Radio.

Segerstam had already established himself as a composer before the songbook's publication: his cantata Den ensamma (The Lonely One), to a text by Frey-Viking Österblom, won first prize in the FSSMF composition competition in 1944. He also published Bicinia (1957), a collection of two-part songs.

His son Leif Segerstam was taken to school with his father from an early age and began playing the violin before starting school, with Selim accompanying him on the piano until the music's demands exceeded his father's ability to keep up.

=== Death ===
On 2 October 1963, Segerstam felt chest pains just before his last lesson of the day and went to the Deaconess Hospital — it proved to be both his last day of life and his last day of work.

== Selected works ==
- Vår sångbok (1952) — school songbook
- Bicinia (1957) — collection of two-part songs
- Cantata Den ensamma (text: Frey-Viking Österblom), winner of FSSMF composition competition 1944
- Piano variations on the folk song Var är vägens mål
- Choral arrangements of Finnish folk songs
