= Jairo Tomico =

Conservative journalist and activist

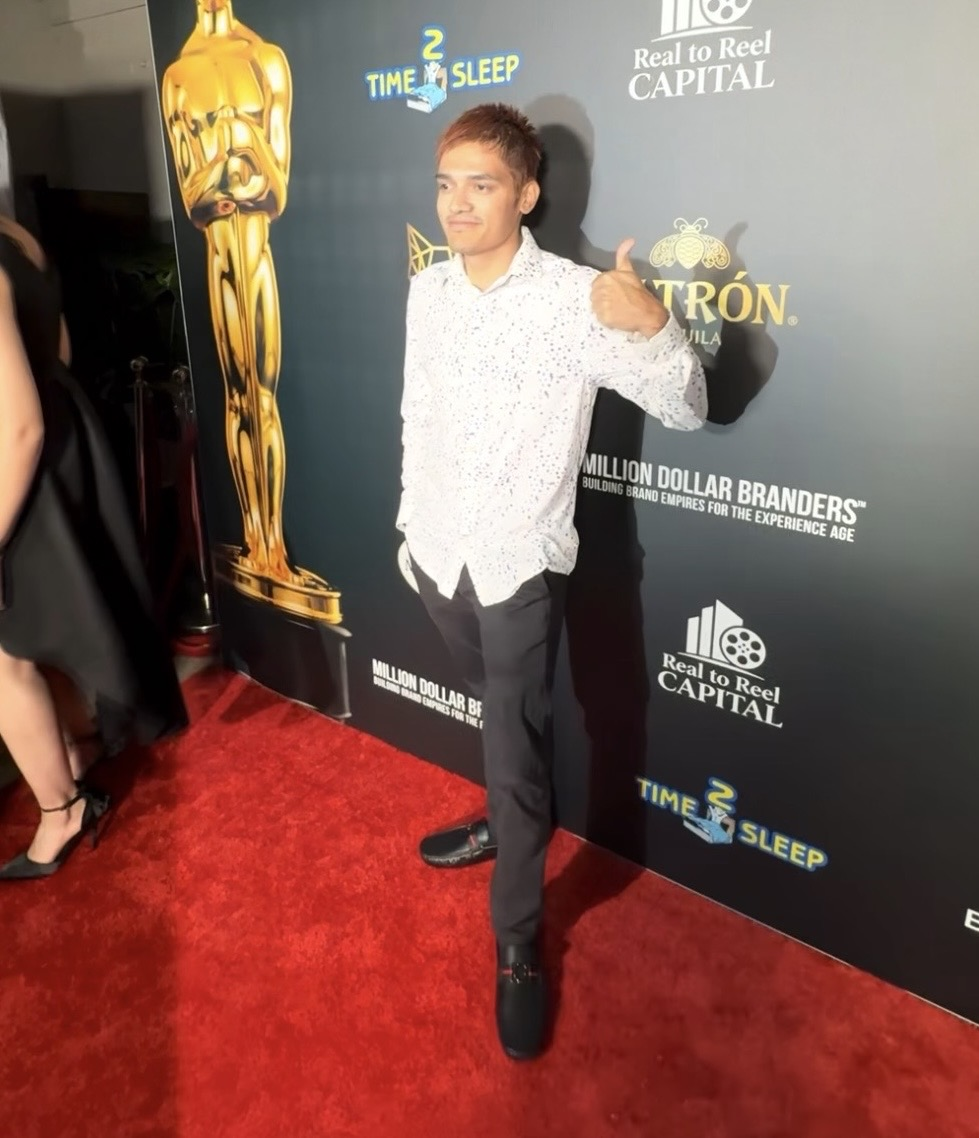
- Citizenship: American
- Occupations: Journalist; Graphic designer Conservative activist Media liaison
- Website: https://jairotomico.com

Jairo Tomico is an American journalist, graphic designer, conservative activist, organizer, and media liaison based in Los Angeles, California. He operates Right Now Views, a media outlet that documents political demonstrations and public incidents, primarily in Southern California. He was previously known as Jairo Rodriguez and also used the alias Jairo Marquez.

Tomico has been involved in several high-profile protests, including events at Dodger Stadium, Wi Spa, and Planned Parenthood clinics. His footage has been featured by outlets such as Fox 11 Los Angeles, and he has appeared in reporting by media organizations including Rolling Stone, Al Jazeera, the Los Angeles Times, and Spectrum News.

Tomico has organized and participated in protests concerning issues such as vaccine mandates, gender policy, and in support of pro-life causes. He has also been associated with the #WalkAway campaign and has spoken at conservative political rallies in Beverly Hills and West Hollywood. In addition to his activism, he serves as a graphic designer and media liaison for local political events.

== Early life and education ==
Jairo Tomico grew up in Texas as an only child, which he has described as instilling an independent streak and a drive to prove doubters wrong. In 2015, he relocated to Los Angeles for a job with an app company, drawn by the city's creative environment.

In 2025, Tomico graduated from the Los Angeles Film School with a degree in Entertainment Business.

== Career ==
Tomico is a journalist and graphic designer, creating flyers, advertisements for conservative political causes in Los Angeles and Beverly Hills. He operates Right Now Views, a Los Angeles-based conservative media company covering political issues.

In September 2023, Tomico, under his former alias Jairo Marquez, documented a chaotic Adidas Skateboarding event in Hollywood, where a car was set on fire. His footage was featured on Fox 11 Los Angeles, and he was interviewed by reporter Chelsea Edwards on the broadcast that night.

In April 2024, Jairo Tomico, known for documenting events, attended the UCLA campus protests concerning the Israel/Palestine conflict, as noted by a local media outlet.

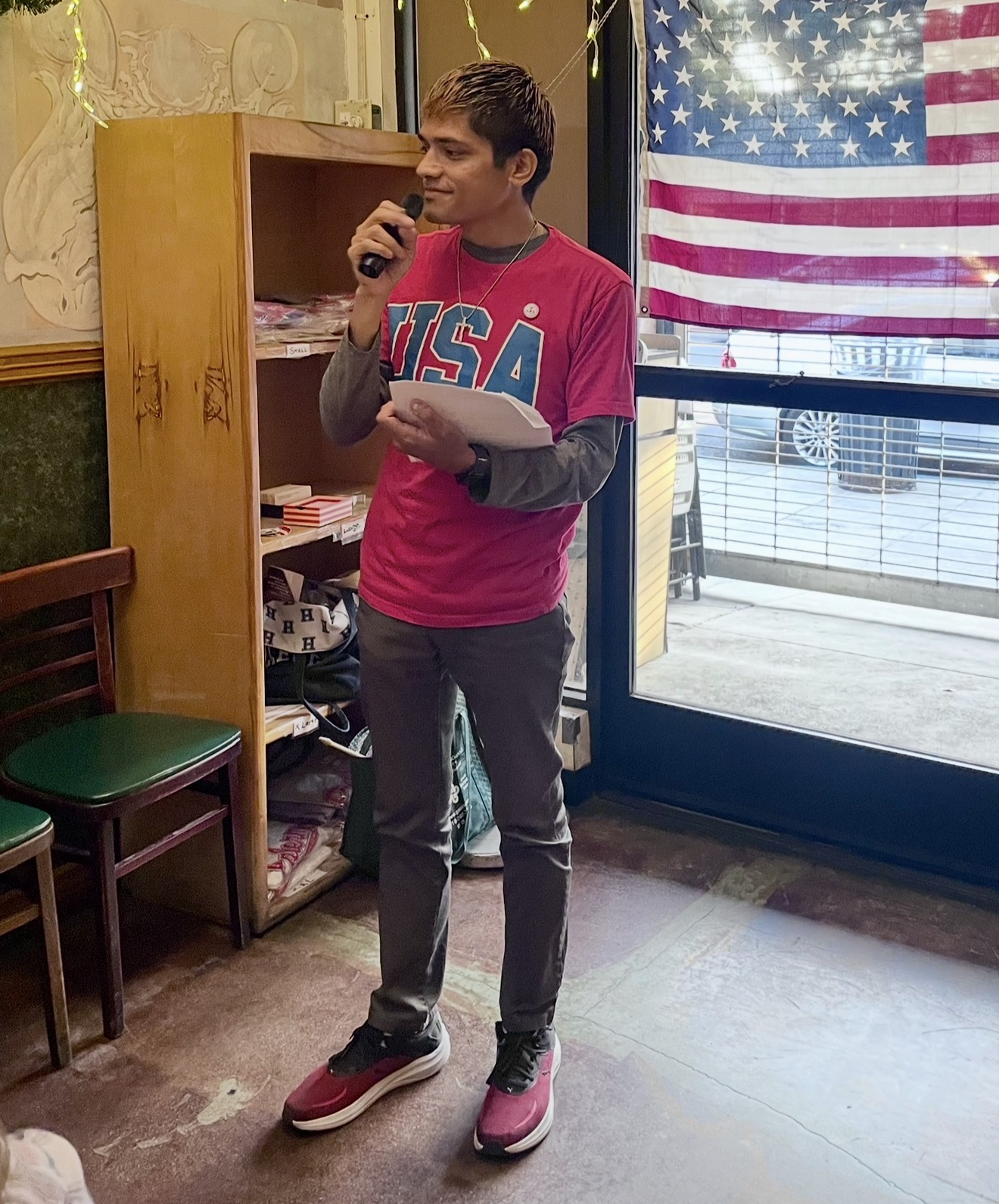
Jairo Tomico, Hollywood, CA 2026

In July 2025, Tomico founded the Hollywood Republican Assembly, a group aimed at connecting and organizing conservatives in Hollywood and surrounding areas through events and meetings. Tomico has also worked on conservative political campaigns in Los Angeles, including design, branding, websites, and signature collection for the 2021 recall election of Governor Gavin Newsom.

== Activism ==
Dodger Stadium Vaccine Site Protest, Elysian Park, Los Angeles (January 30, 2021)

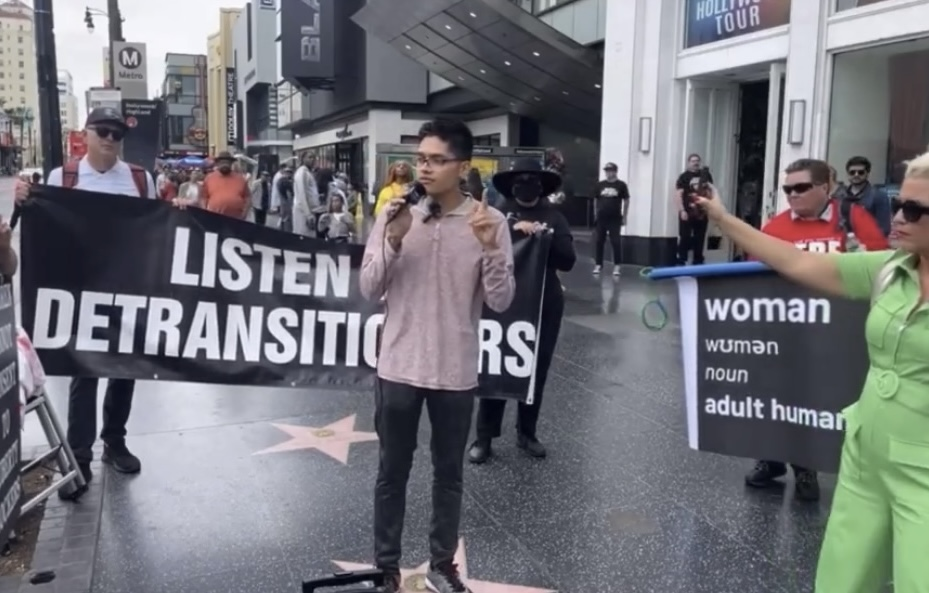
Jairo Tomico, Hollywood, CA 2022

On January 30, 2021, Jairo Tomico was among the protesters who gathered outside Dodger Stadium in Elysian Park, Los Angeles, at a major COVID-19 vaccination site. The protest, which included anti-vaccine activists and other demonstrators, temporarily disrupted operations at one of the largest vaccination sites in the United States, causing a brief shutdown of the facility. Al Jazeera reported that the group, numbering around 50 individuals, carried signs opposing COVID-19 vaccines and public health mandates. Tomico, identified by his alias Jairo Rodriguez in some reports, was noted as a participant in the demonstration. The Los Angeles Fire Department closed the site for approximately one hour due to safety concerns before resuming operations. No violent incidents or arrests were reported, though the event drew significant attention due to its impact on public health efforts during the COVID-19 pandemic.

Wi-Spa Protests, Koreatown, Los Angeles (July 3 & July 17, 2021)

Jairo Tomico, using the alias Jairo Marquez, organized a protest outside the Wi Spa, a Korean spa in Los Angeles, California, on July 3, followed by another protest on July 17, 2021. The protests were triggered by a viral video posted by a customer claiming a transgender woman exposed themselves to others in the spa’s women’s section, prompting debate over transgender access to gender-specific facilities. According to Los Angeles Magazine, on June 29, 2021, Tomico used his Instagram platform to call for an “Anti-Pervert Protest” on July 3, rallying supporters to oppose transgender access to the spa. The July 3 protest, which was featured on TMZ, saw significant conflict, beginning with Tomico being attacked by trans-rights activists. Video footage shows him being knocked to the ground and assaulted by members of Southern California Antifa, who had organized a counterprotest. The counterprotest, which outnumbered Tomico’s group, also targeted other demonstrators, including a group of Hispanic evangelicals, leading to physical altercations. Later that day, members of the Proud Boys, arrived to support Tomico’s side, escalating tensions further. The July 17 protest saw continued clashes, culminating in a violent incident where individuals were stabbed. According to the Los Angeles Times, a man was arrested and charged with assault with a deadly weapon in connection to the protests. The Los Angeles Police Department declared an unlawful assembly and arrested 40 individuals, primarily members of Antifa and trans-rights protesters, for failure to disperse. The event also involved the use of non-lethal projectiles by police, escalating tensions further. The protests drew significant media attention due to their polarizing nature and the broader debate over transgender rights. It later became known as the Wi Spa controversy.

Planned Parenthood Protest, Highland Park, Los Angeles (May 7, 2022)

On May 7, 2022, Jairo Tomico, organized and participated in a protest outside a Planned Parenthood clinic in Highland Park, Los Angeles, California. The demonstration was prompted by the May 2, 2022, leak of a draft Supreme Court opinion suggesting the potential overturning of Roe v. Wade. According to Left Coast Right Watch, Tomico used his Instagram streaming channel “Right Now Views” to call for a “Pro-Life Rally,” encouraging participants to bring signs, flags, and bullhorns to the Los Angeles neighborhood. The event attracted a group of right-wing activists and was met with counter-demonstrators supporting reproductive rights, resulting in a tense standoff.

Drag Story Hour Protest, West Hollywood (April 15, 2023)

On April 15, 2023, Tomico attended a Drag Story Hour protest at the West Hollywood Library, filming counter-protesters. He was assaulted by trans-rights activists during the event, as reported by Rolling Stone and other outlets.

West Hollywood Pride Incident (June 3, 2023)

On June 3, 2023, during West Hollywood’s Pride weekend, Jairo Tomico reported a stolen phone at an event, which led to the arrests of a transgender activist, Xodiac Rose, and their friend Abby Nicole Miller, as covered by Rolling Stone, Knock LA, Discourse Blog, and the Los Angeles Blade. According to Discourse Blog, the arrests sparked controversy, with videos of the incident going viral on social media, raising questions about the legitimacy of the arrests and the use of force by Los Angeles County Sheriff’s deputies at an event intended to be a safe space for LGBTQ+ individuals. Witnesses reported that two deputies allegedly pointed at a “No Cops at Pride” sign and laughed, fueling outrage among attendees. In a statement posted on Los Angeles County Sheriff’s Department (LASD) social media platforms, Sheriff Robert Luna addressed the arrests, stating that deputies responded to a report of a stolen phone and apprehended the individuals based on evidence and witness statements. Then-Mayor of West Hollywood Sepi Shyne issued a statement addressing the incident. She described the arrest as "deeply disconcerting," referencing images of individuals "being held on the pavement surrounded by deputies in gear."

#WalkAway Campaign rally, Beverly Hills (April 27, 2025)

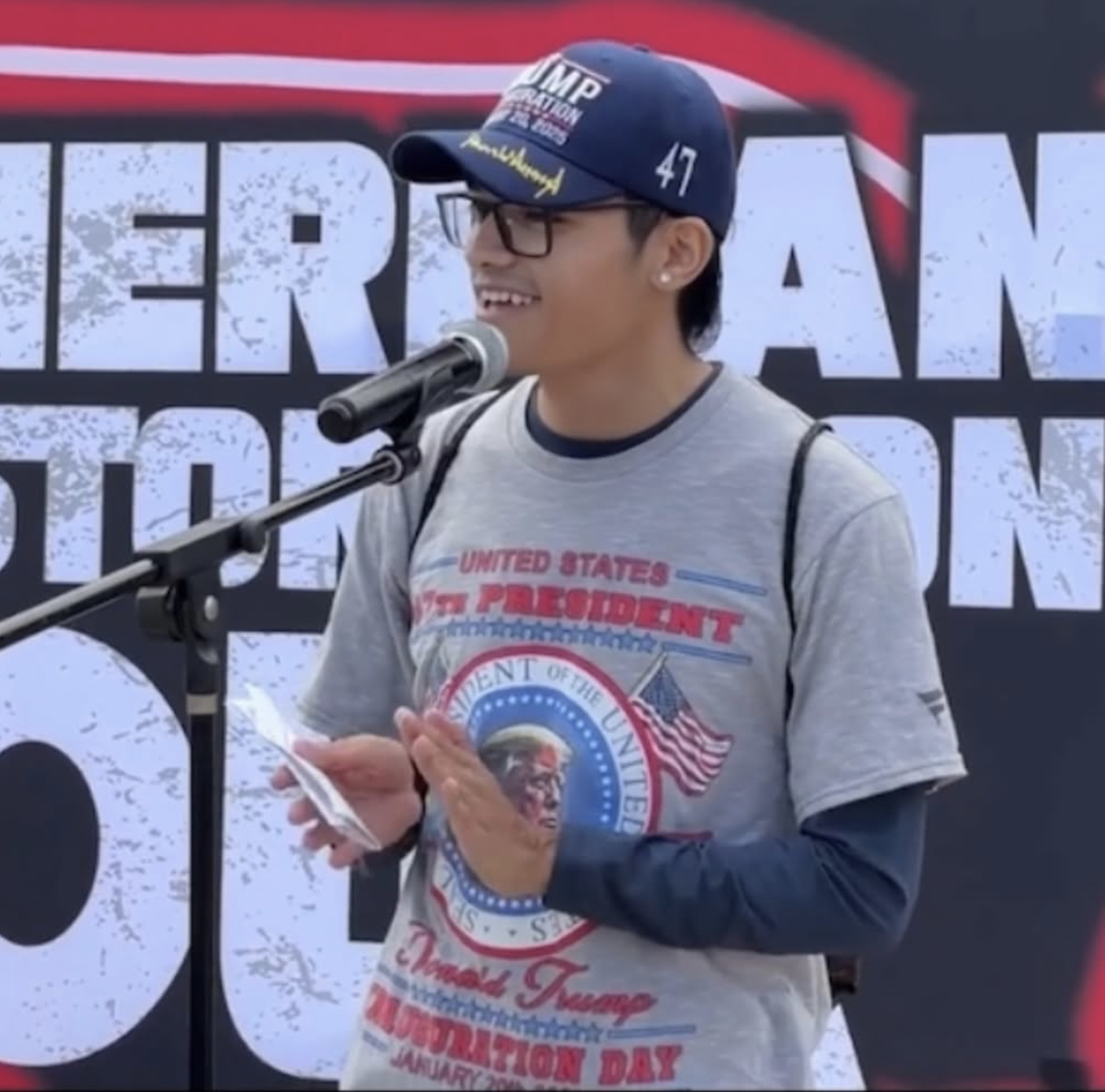
Jairo Tomico, WalkAway, Beverly Hills, CA 2025

Tomico is associated with the #WalkAway campaign, which encourages Democrats to join the Republican Party. On April 27, 2025, he spoke at the "American Restoration Tour" rally from West Hollywood to Beverly Hills. Counter-protesters gathered nearby leading to one arrest. The rally, covered by Spectrum News 1, Los Angeles Times, and included speakers like former U.S. Representative Matt Gaetz and singer Cherie Currie.

== Media and design work ==
Tomico serves as media liaison and graphic designer for the Beverly Hills Freedom Rally, a recurring event promoting conservative values and free speech.
