= The Rosebud Beach Hotel =

1984 film by Harry Hurwitz

- Theatrical poster
- Directed by: Harry Hurwitz
- Written by: Harry Hurwitz; Harry Narunsky; Thomas Rudolph; Irving Schwartz
- Produced by: Irving Schwartz; Harry Hurwitz
- Starring: Colleen Camp; Peter Scolari; Christopher Lee
- Cinematography: João Fernandes
- Edited by: Daniel Loewenthal
- Music by: Jay Chattaway
- Production company: Big Lobby Company
- Distributed by: Almi Pictures
- Release date: November 1984
- Running time: 83 minutes
- Country: United States
- Language: English

The Rosebud Beach Hotel is a 1984 American comedy film directed by Harry Hurwitz and starring Colleen Camp, Peter Scolari, Christopher Lee, and Fran Drescher.

== Plot ==
After taking over a failing Miami hotel with her workaholic fiancé Elliot (Peter Scolari), Tracy (Colleen Camp) thinks model Monique Gabrielle is sleeping with him. She then tries to have an affair of her own, and arranges for hookers to become bellhops. Meanwhile, her father hires an arsonist to blow up the hotel.

== Principal cast ==
Actor	Role
Colleen Camp	Tracy King
Christopher Lee	Clifford King
Peter Scolari	Elliot Garner
Fran Drescher	Linda
Eddie Deezen	Sydney
Chuck McCann	Harold Dorfman
Monique Gabrielle	Liza
Cherie Currie	Cherie
Marie Currie	Marie

== Production ==
The red jumpsuits singing maids Cherie and Marie are seen wearing in this film are the same jumpsuits Markie Post wore in season one of Buck Rogers in the 25th Century. The jumpsuits were re-purposed for the Rosebud Beach Hotel. When Markie was asked if she remembered the suit, she said she remembered it well. She said there were two made for her as it was a long shoot, and while one was being cleaned, she had another to shoot in. Marie Currie said she remembered going to Universal for a fitting for the movie, and production were thrilled to find two of the same suit for them to wear, she didn't know it was made for Buck Rogers.

This is the first film Cherie and Marie Currie acted in together.

A white van in the film has "Irv-Harry's Laundry Service" on its side. The film's producers are Irving Schwartz and Harry Hurwitz.

== Soundtrack ==
The Rosebud Beach Hotel Soundtrack

Soundtrack album by various artists
- Released: 1985
- Recorded: 1984
- Studios: Can-Am Recorders, Reseda, CA.
- Genres: Hard rock, heavy metal, punk rock
- Label: MCA Records
- Producers: Marie Currie, Co-Produced by Stephen Crane and Dan Ferguson

Cherie and Marie Currie sang, wrote, and produced songs for this film and its soundtrack. They sang multiple times in the film. All the songs they sing in the film can be found on the soundtrack. The first two tracks and the final track by Cherie and Marie can be found on Cherie and Marie's 1999 album 80's Collection. However, "Here He Comes" doesn't appear on any of Cherie's albums.

=== Track listing ===
1. "Romeo" (Stephen Crane) – Cherie & Marie Currie
2. "Where's the Music" (Cherie Currie, Dan Ferguson) – Cherie & Marie Currie
3. "Here He Comes" (Wayne Sloan) - Cherie & Marie Currie
4. "Come Down to Miami" (Raquel M. Attias) - Celia Cruz and Willie Colón
5. "Meltdown" (Dow McKeever) - Dow McKeever
6. "Don't Like No Parties" (Dow McKeever) - Dow McKeever
7. "Baby Baby" (Christian Irwin) - Christian Irwin
8. "Scratch" (Greg Anderson, John Duff, Paul Magliari, Lou Vassalla) - The IBM's
9. "Steel" (Cherie Currie, Marie Currie) - Cherie & Marie Currie

=== Personnel ===
- Cherie Currie - vocals
- Marie Currie - vocals
- Stephen Crane - Bass
- Duane Sciacqua - Guitar
- Jody Cortez - Drums
- Ron Rayburn - Guitar

=== Production ===
- Producer: Marie Currie
- Assistant producer: Stephen Crane and Dan Ferguson
