= Young and Wild (album) =

Compilation album by Cherie & Marie Currie
- Released: March 10, 1998
- Recorded: 1977, 1979, 1980
- Genre: Rock; hard rock
- Length: 1:16:43
- Label: Raven Records
- Producer: Jai Winding, (Assistant Produser Michele Winding), Earle Mankey, Kim Fowley

Cherie & Marie Currie chronology
Messin' with the Boys (Cherie & Marie Currie) (1980)	Young and Wild (1998)	The 80's Collection (Cherie Currie/Cherie & Marie Currie) (1999)

Young and Wild is a compilation by Cherie & Marie Currie. This album has all 10 original tracks from Messin' with the Boys, six songs from Beauty's Only Skin Deep, three songs Cherie Currie sang with The Runaways, and one new track co-written by Marie Currie, "Longer Than Forever". "Longer Than Forever" was the B side of the single "Since You Been Gone". Kim Fowley tried to engage in intellectual property infringement by releasing the album without Cherie or Marie's approval. Cherie Currie says on Reality Check TV, Episode #580, that aired 8/17/13, “He (Kim Fowley) stole my Capitol record, (Messin’ with the Boys), and released it in Australia (Young and Wild), when I was re-releasing it (Messin’ with the Boys). He continued to rip me off into my forties.”

Cherie Currie recorded "Strawberry Fields" and "Here Comes the Sun" for the film Sgt. Pepper's Lonely Hearts Club Band, unfortunately, her covers were rejected, and she didn't get a part in the film.

== Track listing ==
Cherie & Marie Currie

1. "Messin' with the Boys" (Joey Brasler, M. Ruth) – 3:47
2. "Since You Been Gone" (Russ Ballard) – 3:41
3. "I Just Love the Feeling" (featuring Bobby Kimball) (Bobby Kimball, Cherie Currie) – 4:32
4. "All I Want" (John Batdorf, Sue Sheridan) – 3:40
5. "Overnight Sensation (Hit Record)" (Eric Carmen) – 5:01
6. "Elaine" (David Paich) – 3:20
7. "This Time" (Billy Bizeau) – 6:08
8. "Wishing Well" (John Bundrick, Simon Kirke, Paul Kossoff, Paul Rodgers, Tetsu Yamauchi) – 3:27
9. "Secrets" (Cherie Currie, Michelle Winding) – 2:26
10. "We're Through" (Joey Brasler) – 5:13
11. "Longer than Forever" (Marie Currie, Steve Lukather) - 4:03
12. "Love at First Sight" (Billy Bizeau) – 4:01

Cherie Currie

1. 13."Beauty's Only Skin Deep" (Cherie Currie, David Carr, Kim Fowley) – 3:51
2. 14."That's the Kind of Guy I Like" (Steven T.) – 3:14
3. 15."I Like the Way You Dance" (Steven T.) – 3:09
4. 16."Science Fiction Daze" (Steven T., Kim Fowley) – 4:06
5. 17."Young and Wild" (Steven T., Kim Fowley) – 2:52

The Runaways

1. 18."Hollywood Dream" (Kim Fowley, Jack McCulloch, Jimmy McCulloch, Steven T.) - 3:53
2. 19."Strawberry Fields" (John Lennon, Paul McCartney) - (3:19)
3. 20."Here Comes the Sun" (George Harrison) - (3:02)

== Personnel ==
- Cherie Currie - vocals, keyboards on tracks 19 and 20
- Marie Currie - vocals
- Steve Lukather - (guitar on tracks 1–11)
- Waddy Wachtel - (guitar on tracks 1–11)
- Joey Brasler - (guitar on tracks 1–11)
- Mike Porcaro - (bass guitar on tracks 1–11)
- Mike Baird - (drums on tracks 1–11)
- Jai Winding - synthesizer, (keyboards on tracks 1–11)
- Trevor Veitch - acoustic guitar on "Since You've Been Gone"
- John Pierce - bass guitar on "We're Through"
- Mike Landau - guitar on "We're Through"
- Bill Champlin, Tom Kelly, Bobby Kimball, Keith Landry, Tommy Funderburk, Tom Werman - (backing vocals on tracks 1–11)
- Steven T. - (guitars, backing vocals on tracks 12–17)
- Dan Ferguson - (guitars on tracks 12–17)
- Thom Rotella - (guitars on tracks 12–17)
- Moose McCains - (bass, backing vocals on tracks 12–17)
- Sal Maida - (bass on tracks 12–17)
- David Hungate - (bass on tracks 12–17)
- Willy Ornellas - (drums, percussion on tracks 12–17)
- Billy Thomas - (drums on tracks 12–17)
- Joan Jett - guitar on "Hollywood Dream"
- Sandy West - drums on "Hollywood Dream"

== Production ==
- Producer: Jai Winding, Earle Mankey, Kim Fowley
- Assistant producer: Michele Winding
