= List of symphonies by Leif Segerstam =

This is a list of symphonies by Leif Segerstam.

== List ==
Symphony number	Name	Year
(1)	Symphony of Slow Movements, Orchestral Diary Sheets Nos. 33, 34, 36	1977 - 1978
2	Orchestral Diary Sheet No. 22	1980
3	Orchestral Diary Sheet No. 23	1981
4	in Two or Three movements, Orchestral Diary Sheet Nos. 24, 25, 26	1981
5	Orchestral Diary Sheet No. 12	1982
6	Orchestral Diary Sheet No. 7	1982
7	Orchestral Diary Sheet No. 15	1982
8	Orchestral Diary Sheets Nos. 1 and 2	1984 - 1985
9	Orchestral Diary Sheet No. 3	1984
10	X, Three Times...	1986
11	Orchestral Diary Sheet No. 5	1986
12	After the Flood, Orchestral Diary Sheet No. 9	1986
13	XIII, Orchestral Diary Sheet No. 13	1987
14	Moments of Peace III; Orchestral Diary Sheet No. 44	1987
15	Ecliptic Thoughts	1990
16	Thoughts at the Border	1990
17	Thoughts 1987, Thoughts before 1992; Orchestral Diary Sheet No. 49	1987 - 1991
18	Unelma – A Dream; Orchestral Diary Sheet No. 66	1993
19	August Segesa Kuikka...	1994
20	December	1995
21	September; Visions at Korpijärvi...	1995
22	in Määrpää – clouds...	1997
23	Afterthoughts questioning questionings Motto: To question or not to question, that is to be...	1998
24	Symphonic Thoughts at the Change of a Millenium	1998
25	Symphonic Thoughts before the Change of the Millenium	1998
26	Symphonic Thoughts at the End of the Millenium	1998
27	Symphonic Thoughts after the Change of the Millenium No. 1	1998
28	Symphonic Thoughts after the Change of the Millenium No. 2?	1999
29	After thoughts questioning questionings No. 2...	1999
30	Embracing the Nature...	1999
31	After thoughts questioning questionings No. 3	1999
32	Recyclings	1999
33	Thoughts into the 3rd Millenium	1999
34	Symphonic Thoughts – Disregarding the Change of the Millenium	2000
35	Flashbacking Backwardsly...	2000
36	Vocal Truths...	2000
37	On a Birthday	2000
38	Flashbacks of Symphonic Thoughts	2000
39	Voices of Nordic Softness	2000
40	Embracing Tones	2000
41	After 40...	2000
42	Nostalgico Melodioso...	2000
43	For Trees...	2000
44	Sitting for a Portrait...	2000
45	Between the Ears	2000
46	Between the lines...	2000
47	Dreaming again... before...	2000
48	Bleedings for Pencilled Sounds...	2000
49	Nameless but Thoughtful...	2000
50	Before 60	2000
51	After 50	2000
52	After a Birthday	2000
53	Dreaming again... after...	2000
54	Dreaming again... because...	2000
55	Augustic Notations	2000
56	Catching Up in Numbers	2000
57	Waiting for More Crossings, Passings, Touchings & Ups & Downs	2000
58	Easteric Thoughts...	2001
59	In a Baggage to Japan...	2001
60	Before 70...	2001
61	After 60... One more before...	2001
62	Thinking of & Surfing on... some... Numbers	2001
63	SING-A-PÅ-RE, Sing! Apor: E!!...	2002
64	Sunday Morning... before & after...	2002
65	Bothnic Thoughts	2002
66	More Serious than Sexy...	2002
67	After the 21252nd Day...	2002
68	Nameless... just numbered...	2002
69	Surfing & clicking &...	2002
70	Before 80...	2002
71	After 70...	2002
72	Nameless... kept secret...	2002
73	1 after 72...	2002
74	2nd after 72...	2002
75	3rd after 72...	2002
76	4th after 72...	2002
77	Footnotes... in... between...	2002
78	See(sea)ing Sounds at a Lakeside...	2002
79	Se, Vent y Nine – look, wait & mate...	2002
80	Before Ninety...	2002
81	After Eighty...	2002
82	At the end of (another = again one more) year...	2002
83	From Autumn again to Spring again...	2003
84	For a Milestone... Leif Segerstam 60 years 2.3.2004...	2003
85	HADES...	2003
86	A(a)TE&(y)SIC!s...	2003
87	The Erected Infinity 8 is-a(=e)-friend?-ven(=vän)...?	2003
88	8x8=64	2003
89	One before Ninety...	2003
90	Because-because... = Six-ty... Hannele Segerstam Six-ty years on 19.8.2003	2003
91	Nostalgic Number...	2003
92	Formula 4...	2003
93	Meeting Point...	2003
94	Starting Point...	2003
95	Working Hard...	2003
96	Making life...	2003
97	Violaelina...	2003
98	Selimoskar...	2003
99	Iirisilona...	2003
100	On the other hand I am not afraid...	2003
101	104 to 104...!	2004
102	103 to 104...	2004
103	102 to 104...	2004
104	Ah, Finalmente!...	2004
105	Pa-Pá, Pá-Pa-Passing...	2004
106	Hommage a Anton Bruckner...	2004
107	Summer visions...	2004
108	"LOVIISA..." & her swancake...	2004
109	"VOLDEMAR..." & his beautiful mountains...	2004
110	"MILENA..." & her generous embracings...	2004
111	sorrowmosquitocaterpillarformations... towards... because...	2004
112	Scaling scales up & down with a BESMAN (scale)...	2004
113	11–3=...	2004
114	perhaps with crutches for...	2004
115	Listening to the tree clapping your shoulder...	2004
116	After Summer...	2004
117	When Autumn Starts...	2004
118	Strolling in Freepulsative Landscapes of Sound...	2004
119	More Strollings in Free-pulsative Landscapes of Sound...	2004
120	Notations during protected Time...	2004
121	Notations at the End of a Protected Time...	2005
122	Tsunamic Zoomings...	2005
123	Listening to a Start...	2005
124	Displaying sounds in doubled quantities...	2005
125	addingly deriving the numbers of sounds displayed...	2005
126	A Mei-Legend...	2005
127	Before Summer...	2005
128	Admiring the Nordic Nature...	2005
129	Spurting notative sounds...	2005
130	Some summery summaries...	2005
131	Some more summery summaries...	2005
132	Pasting Sounds thinking Numbers zig-zagly...	2005
133	A Meadow of freely pulsating Sounds...	2005
134	Freepulsative Meadows of Sounds...	2005
135	Displaying isles of Sounds...	2005
136	Notating sound-islands...	2005
137	More islands of Sounds...	2005
138	Notating Isles of Sounds...	2005
139	Catching Randomities...	2005
140	Notating Randomities...	2005
141	Listening for Randomities...	2005
142	Fishing for Randomities...	2005
143	Seeing Randomities of Sound...	2005
144	AIHMÉ (a Wonder!) BORN TO-DIE... I feel VIEL! (Japanese-German...) 1, 4, 4!...	2005
145	Today... again...	2005
146	OH-Ja-Panese-Ger-Man...	2005
147	Before the Season Starts...	2005
148	Before the Season Starts Again...	2005
149	14,9,149:14,9...!=I feel, No, I feel so: OH DEATH, SUFFERING...!	2005
150	OH, Five Only...?!	2005
151	Challenging the risks with Molto "FLU-ENTE", largamente grandioso... al...	2006
152	After: "Oh Lord, Toss KANIINI; LAPIN Poika!" won...!	2006
153	Sudokushes...	2006
154	Inspired by MÄÄRKIRI...	2006
155	More footnotes... in... between...	2006
156	Because of Summer-Times...	2006
157	In Midsummery Moods...	2006
158	18.6... TAR...JA!, Taking it...YES!" in memoriam Tarja Makkonen	2006
159	Sharing Visions with Visitors...	2006
160	Returning to Notations...	2006
161	Thinking & feeling Goodbye to Notations...	2006
162	Doubling the number for Bergen!	2006
163	Accepting the thought of a Goodbye to Notations fo [sic] a while...	2006
164	Thinking of steps & terrace-levels in Määrpää...	2006
165	Measuring musical thoughts in Six Frames freepulsatively without barlines...	2006
166	Ota vaan! & surffaa OTAVAAN...! Displaying musical material in Six Frames freepulsatively without barlines... First in a series of the Star symphonies.	2006
167	Thinking musical lines in Six Frames freepulsatively without barlines...	2006
168	Moving on orchestral sounds in Six Frames freepulsatively without barlines...	2006
169	Surfing on musical thoughts in Six Frames freepulsatively without barlines...	2006
170	Looking at musical plasms in Six Frames freepulsatively without barlines...	2006
171	Skinpumply pumpskinned musical pumpkins...	2006
172	Enjoying newly tuned pianos... Last in a series of the Star symphonies.	2006
173	Launching Thoughts into Nexties... Hommage-Epitaph, the great personality MIRJAM HELIN in memoriam!	2006 - 2007
174	Welcoming returning birds solemnly...	2007
175	When an eagle eyes eagerly...	2007
176	Re-living motivations revealed...	2007
177	Re-enliving revealed motivations for sounds...	2007
178	In the (Easter-) isle of Time (-life) after Winter before Summer...	2007
179	Rainbows of the Blue Moon...	2007
180	Inspirationbargains for musical visions found e.g. around giant flying extraterrestrial whales or golden fullerenes measured in nanometers & ångströms...	2007
181	Names itself when played...	2007
182	Before giving-ups...	2007
183	Notatively inspired by a Viennese friends name...	2007
184	Tripping in nostalgic centuries...	2007
185	Casting Broadly Thoughts or Shadows on left- or rightovers from pathcrossings in mental musical freewaysystems...	2007
186	When the Muse was away...	2007
187	Autumnal Leif-live-leaves...	2007
188	I ate-ate... "188", in RUSKA-clothing for the Autumnal LEAVE...	2007
189	Getting inspiration from MARIMEKKO & Natures beautiful RUSKA whilst surfing in the likewise Autumnal Lifescore...	2007
190	UFO, Under F & Over...	2007
191	11.2.08... When the Eleventh arrived...	2008
192	a Rat's "RAT"... :˜ Rätt Rad...! That's that	2008
193	To be "Antsk" og make "Fisk-Arts"...	2008
194	Feeling Steps & Paths TOWARDS...	2008
195	Yes, Pray...: light: "Si, Be, ljus..."	2008
196	Äikkäthy ilut – ylneddus emac...	2008
197	Su-doku.9.com/posing12...	2008
198	Spring or Winter, Winter or Spring	2008
199	At the End of the Second Century	2008
200	Starting the Last Century	2008
201	NUO otin..:.. Nuotin "NU" otin...!	2008
202	"CECILIA, cessi, ..." (cecci... gis-sa... guess... G & Ebs & : Gb...gess...et.c...)	2008
203	IN ger Sam ze-lius...	2008
204	"NY71U" (a life-booking-code...)	2008
205	e.g. Sakuntala...	2008
206	19.8.1943 + 1944, 3887, 26 + 27 = 53 = 8, 17 + 18 = 35, = 8, 65 = 11...	2008
207	Pururavas & Urivashi – Blubblub & Därrur...?	2008
208	Cess(n)a Cäravän 208 Kärajan...	2008
209	"Nono? yesyes? sey it....seysey only ONon, 22....	2008
210	After Two, oh no, Two I owe....	2008
211	"Two eyes, eggs & arrowheads...." (P.S. Tummies – AA-men...but, !)	2009
212	"You there!, Me? To meet... where..." (Du-Da-Mel, 2–1–2...)	2008
213	Two I ate to not notate...	2009
214	"To me.... Death, (sleep infinitely; to not notate....)": (22.8.; 2008....)	2009
215	Chorales calling	2009
216	Särestävän särestöviä raitoja ja raiteita Reidarin reiteille	2009
217	Looking at the same tree which once knocked me on my shoulder	2009
218	THOUGHTS in different LIGHTS... (some seeing lights...)	2009
219	Extended sensic expectations from a memory bank...	2009
220	White Nights, No Snow, but the Show goes on...	2009
221	Just listening...	2009
222	Just guessing...	2009
223	Just letting go...(like e.g. sometimes when sailing...)	2009
224	Just remembering...	2009
225	Just feeling...	2009
226	Just thinking...	2009
227	MUSIC stirred up during daily "Nordic-walking-pilgrimages" to the local mailboxpoint hoping to fetch linking letters & parcels with stimulative & inspirative motivations for the current surfings in the autumnal lifescores homepageterritories...	2009
228	Cooling my beard too (2) on "Sval"bard, "Spit"sbergen farewelling (on the "seal"ed waters) the blinding "spittingly" ice- (& eyes) cracking Sun (setstart on 22.8...!) with my Son (J. S.) remembering nostalgically "lace"- (spets-) coverings of (e.g.) Venusmountains as well as all those got... (lays...) – It is very windy on the tops, "the picked peaks for peeking into the ∞s...", "spets"-listening too... 2... 8!	2009
229	JoJo	2009
230	Two, Nought, Nought & Nine	2009
231	About Völvan	2009
232	Textless lines from Völvan	2010
233	Fragmental Völvations from my Opera-To-Be...	2010
234	Excerpt No 1 from my opera to be: Völvan...	2010
235	IN-ÄR-I	2010
236	OUT is outside....	2010
237	After catching THE Glimpse of LCY144&NEJ720....	2010
238	Before, when & after THE CITIZ arrived...	2010
239	YANGHAI SHAMANIC DREAMS...	2010
240	TELLUS! tell Us! & the BP-s...: Fill the Hole (The WHOLE?...)	2010
241	"SHE..", "SIE..."	2011
242	Lights of Love...	2011
243	"8.3.2011..." day of ♀...!	2011
244	Musical Northlightbeams sending comforting vibrations to the screaming Japanese souls caught in their nightmare...	2011
245	Eyelighthighlites..	2011
246	Credo	2011
247	"From a Tuijanest" in the Ö-landic forests...	2011
248	Errorings of Mirrorings...	2011
249	Some “Summer-Summaries” before it RINGs again...	2011
250	Autumnal Thoughts after it RINGed again...	2011
251	"Ringing for David Searcy...." (David Searcy in memoriam)	2011
252	Surfing on Higg's bosons to Kepler – 22b...	2011
253	Crazyly alone at Christmas, but in the family of universes of sounds	2011
254	Stormy Tempestings in between Alternatives...: NO-YES...	2012
255	E-DU-R-E-DO...	2012
256	Listening to and looking at Tales & Visions in the opened souls of the STONES in Finnish SMOKESAUNA...	2012
257	The VALUE around Kalevalavaalavaluja...	2012
258	Enchanted by the famous pigletpettattoes of Viola Segerstam	2012
259	A Loving, Serving & Remembering Symfuunic Sinfuunia,: THE UUNIQUE SYMPHUUNIO at Pörskypekkamäntylä No. 149...	2012
260	Opelic Thoughts & Surfings with TNP-975 in Augustic Landscapes of Suomi-Finland...	2012
261	MM & MM... Maaslander-Mice & Marslander-Men...	2013
262	Inspired by AROS...	2013
263	Answering No. 212...	2013
264	2B – EIJING, AAAAA; NONONONONONO:: NOW!!!...	2013
265	Ei! No!, Ei-no Lei(f)-no... despite 2x grandioso Masses of Morte!... (More Tea... hahhahh)...	2013
266	Border crossings...	2013
267	The 8th Wave	2013
268	Recycling thoughts and memories before a birthday No. 1	2013
269	Recycling thoughts and memories before and after a birthday No. 2	2014
270	Recycling thoughts and memories before and after a Birthday No. 3	2014
271	Recycling thoughts and memories before and after a Birthday No. 4	2014
272	Summery Screamings	2014
273	Knowing – looking – seeing, ... not yet !	2014
274	Knowing – Seeing, Yes...	2014
275	Trusting Cyberknife's knowing and seeing...	2014
276	Successful mental & corpsal combinationcopulations in creative chaoses...	2014
277	Quintuple musical graffities (dedicated to Viola Segerstam) in six visions for freepulsative orchestra...	2014
278	Impressions of Nordic Nostalgies at Symposiums in restaurant Korcula, Zagreb...	2014
279	Surfing on Thoughts & Visions experienced during a mental mezzomarathon of music...	2014
280	Feeling the Healing surfings in Clouds of Inspirative Iridescence streaming from Grandiose Grandchildren... "in the days After..." (with gratitude resonance vibrating eternally)	2014
281	A Measurewormic Morning... (for the early birds, not angry and without bar-lines...)	2014
282	Surviving Subtropic Surroundings in the North of Aurea Borealis...	2014
283	Always Smiling "if"... (Leif-Live: Le-"if"...!)	2014
284	Pisces Fishing for Pieces (Peaces)... All Over??? Not Yet!!!	2014
285	Going On... until... and "beyond"...	2014
286	Thoughts & Visions in a Life-score Moment...	2015
287	Embracing a Garden and feeling Natures Powers...	2015
288	Letting the FLOW go on...	2015
289	When a cat visited	2015
290	Calling the 112 in woody galaxies of the multiverses....	2015
291	"BBC, ABC...."	2015
292	In Christmastime 2015: Snow-when, Snow-where, Snow-white, Black..., -out-there, so-;: Snow-what!!!!	2015
293	"Feeling the enormous amount of difficult challenges the next generations have to overwin in order to succeed in their lifescores...." (after the teenchildren paid me a visit...)	2016
294	Songs of a UNICORN heralding...	2016
295	ulF SöDErBlom in Memoriam...	2016
296	Englische Ornamente	2016
297	Sinfonia (piccola) No. 297 with Royal Cello Obligato Solo...	2016
298	Stretching thoughts towards... (Eri Klas in memoriam)	2016
299	Symphony No. 299 with 1–12 Cello Obligat Soli... LAMENT !!!! – Seppo Laamanen in memoriam!....	2016
300	STATUS QUO...	2016
301	"Restarting...." honoring the memory of Juhani Raiskinen....!	2016
302	"A musical conscience fundamentally & universally"	2016
303	"Honouring my tonechoosing colleague Dmitri Shostakovich with painting a lot of DSCH-minitatoos on four homepages taken out of the storage library in my musical conscience between my ears..."	2016
304	WITHOUT BREAX-IN-TO-IT-UNI-ONS & OFFS! U.P.S.H.!,...	2016
305	KAIT KITES "A-leja", a L-Ei-ja, leijailee-if....	2016
306	Strawberrylic Surfings during Carnavaltime (8.-10.7.2016) in Suonenjoki... : = Summery Thoughts and Visions zooming penetratively throughout the global ORIGOS in the Rich Finnish Nature....	2016
307	Digging up old chains of euforic inspirations old-fashionedly looking into Tunnels leading to surrounding dimensions...	2016
308	Suvereenejä suvireenejä Sovereign Summery Speedings...	2016
309	"Situations" in freepulsative surfs multiversly... Kalle Holberg in Memoriam	2016
310	Escaping from today's realities into the healing waves of musical surfings inspired by the Nordic natures status quo...	2017
311	Sinfonia seriosa. "Fundeerauksia... "Ponderings..."; President Mauno Koivisto 12.5.2017 in memoriam with musical thoughts...	2017
312	Seriosa & piccola	2017
313	The most famously known car registration number...!	2017
314	π x 4=3,14 & 3,14 & 3,14 & 3,14...	2017
315	...HELMUT KOHL IN MEMORIAM...	2017
316	"Happy Tonechooseries in the Summerfreetimes...."	2017
317	A St. Michel-guide to gourmet-tidbits of musical substances	2017
318	Standing up surviving after feeling offended and desauvuored with humiliation and mental bypassings yesterdaylicly and seeking now comfort in formulating just "a classical symphonic tonechoosery..." (this time)	2017
319	"Ihmisihme...." (A Human Wonder)	2018
320	"Baking music recyclingly ...from a Liedreise"	2018
321	Sinfonia piccola. "Rejoicing the medaljeuxes of Finland in the Pyongyang olympics..."	2018
322	Sinfonia piccola. "Waiting for the pandalinos to emerge...	2018
323	Sinfonia piccola. "PingPingPing Do, PingPingPing LA, PingPingPing SI, PingPingPing STOP..."	2018
324	Sinfonia piccola. Next Spring...("SO-IS-THAW...") (NIIN-IS-TÖ)	2018
325	Sinfonia piccola. ("Raja-avaimet...") "Borderkeys for the keyboard..."	2018
326	Sinfonia piccola. "Tonechooseries in Finnish indian-summer 2018..."	2018
327	Sinfonia piccola. "More Tonechooseries in the Finnish Indian Summer 2018"	2018
328	Minisinfonia. "Seconda volta of 'Maaslander mice & Marslander men...' rejoicing the successful US space mission"	2018
329	Minisinfonia. "More dreamings by Sofia (a Dog...)"	2018
330	Minisinfonia. "Oodi Oodille" "An Ode for the Odeion..."	2018
331	Minisinfonia. "Musical claims under the heaven of Heinävesi Church..."	2019
332	Minisinfonia. "Thoughts beyond where Sven-David Sandström now is... Mini-Symphony No. 332"	2019
333	Minisinfonia. "3+3+3 = 9, 3–4–2 = the morning Tea... 8 ly... Mini-Symphony No. 333"	2019
334	Minisinfonia. "Kuoli... ku oli, ku olen, en kuole..."	2019
335	Minisinfonia."GIS, g, 2, ess, GIS, e, ess, g... Mini-Symphony No. 335"	2019
336	Minisinfonia. "Exoplanet Surfings in ExoticAurorabeams After or Before..."	2020
337	Minisinfonia. "Forrest Gumply..."	2020
338	Sinfonia piccola. "Crawling in dolphinformic limbos of thoughts on different levels of consciences towards the multiverses of infinite musical vibrationchoices"	2020
339	Sinfonia piccola. "Coronavirus chaoticlies in prisonic moods"	2020
340	Minipiccola Symphony. "Hääyöaie..."	2020
341	Mini Sinfonia Piccola. "In changing moods surfing..."	2020
342	"Musical perseverences..." ("Marslander Mail...")	2020
343	Sinfonia piccola. "Surfing with Musical Beam, Lase or Brain Currents, with Aims at Mars..."	2021
344	"Saluting a royal soul...", bordercrossingly...	2021
345	Minisinfonia piccola. "Returning to standard, normal tonechoosing therapy....."	2021
346	Minisinfonia piccola. "At a Notationtable ..." (again)	2021
347	Minisinfonia piccola. "Repeated Thoughts with different visioms..."	2021
348	Minisinfonia piccola. "Tonechoosing and notations during & after the Riika-Storm in Mid-Finland"	2021
349	Sinfonia piccola. "The last on in July... connecting with 335..."	2021
350	Sinfonia piccola. "Tonechooseries post corona"	2022
351	Minisinfonia. "Despite the worlds situation...!"	2022
352	Minisinfonia. "At Midsummer Time freepulsatively..."	2022
353	Minisinfonia. "A suite to follow suite, sweet & salty, sur fing free-pulsative this life-score... "	2023
354	"(for the four papers...) in Aino Kliniikka, a "clean" "friendbrothership".... "	2023
355	Minisinfonia. "Towards next tonechoosery..."	2024

== Sources ==
- List of compositions by Leif Segerstam.
