= Cherie Currie =

American musician, actress, and woodcarver (born 1959)

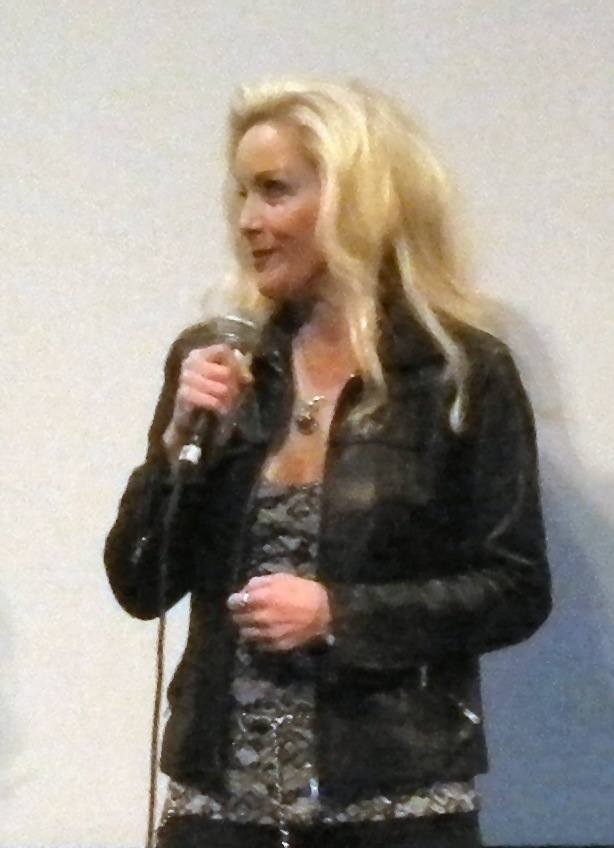
- Currie in March 2010

Background information
- Born: November 30, 1959 (age 66); Encino, California, U.S.
- Genres: Punk rock; hard rock
- Occupations: Musician; singer; songwriter; actress; artist; producer
- Instruments: Vocals; guitar
- Years active: 1975–present
- Labels: Mercury; Capitol; Raven; MCA; Rocket City; Blue Elan
- Formerly of: The Runaways; Cherie & Marie Currie; Tater Totz; Cherie Currie and Brie Darling
- Spouse: Robert Hays (m. 1990; div. 1997)

Cherie Currie (born November 30, 1959) is an American singer, musician, actress, and artist. Currie was the lead vocalist of the Runaways, a rock band from Los Angeles, in the mid-to-late 1970s. She later became a solo artist. Currie and her identical twin sister, Marie Currie, released the album Messin' With The Boys in 1980 as Cherie & Marie Currie. Their duet "Since You Been Gone" reached number 95 on US charts. She is also known for her role in the 1980 film Foxes.

== Early life ==
Currie was born to Don Currie and actress Marie Harmon. She was raised in Encino, California. She has an identical twin sister, Marie Currie.

Currie and her twin sister were given a role on an episode of My Three Sons at the age of two. They were due to sing "Twinkle, Twinkle, Little Star" with Fred MacMurray but they froze during filming and their part was cut from the show. Before Currie and her twin sister rose to fame, they appeared on American Bandstand as background dancers.

== Career ==
=== The Runaways ===
In 1975, when she was 15 years old, Currie joined the all-female rock band the Runaways, performing as lead vocalist. Her bandmates were Joan Jett, Lita Ford, Sandy West, Jackie Fox and Vicki Blue. Bomp! magazine described her as "the lost daughter of Iggy Pop and Brigitte Bardot".

=== Solo ===
Currie recorded three albums with The Runaways, The Runaways, Queens of Noise and Live In Japan. She signed a four-album deal with Mercury, but left The Runaways after the third album. To fulfil her contract, she recorded Beauty's Only Skin Deep for Polygram Records as a solo artist. Marie Currie was featured on the track "Love At First Sight".

=== Cherie and Marie Currie ===
After Currie left The Runaways at age seventeen, she performed in clubs in Los Angeles. Marie joined her onstage for encores, which drew a positive response from audiences. When Marie joined Cherie on a promotional tour in Japan, they had the idea of recording an album together. They recorded Messin' With The Boys for Capitol Records, released in 1979. "Since You Been Gone", a cover of the Russ Ballard song, reached number 95 on the charts.

Cherie and Marie performed on television shows in the 1980s including Sha Na Na, The Mike Douglas Show, and The Merv Griffin Show. They wrote and produced songs for the soundtrack of the 1984 film The Rosebud Beach Hotel. They acted and sang together in the film. In 1991, Cherie and Marie Currie performed a tribute concert to Paula Pierce, a member of The Pandoras. For the final song, the remaining Pandoras backed the Curries. Currie performed at The Runaways' reunion in 1994 with Jackie Fox and Sandy West. Her sister Marie joined the three Runaways on stage and performed with the band.

In 1998, Cherie and Marie held a concert at the Golden Apple, in support of their re-released version of Messin' With The Boys. Cherie's ex-bandmate West joined Cherie on stage to perform some of the Runaways songs. The Curries and West signed autographs after the show. In 1998, the compilation Young and Wild was released. Another compilation, 80s Collection, was released in 2000 by Times Square Productions.

=== Film and television ===
Cherie starred in the film Foxes in 1980 with Jodie Foster, and received strong reviews for her acting debut. She also appeared in Parasite, Wavelength, Twilight Zone: The Movie, The Rosebud Beach Hotel (with Marie Currie), and Rich Girl. She made guest appearances on television series including Matlock and Murder, She Wrote. In 1984, Currie was cast as Brenda in Savage Streets, but was replaced by Linda Blair. She was also cast as the lead singer of the fictional band the Dose in the film This Is Spinal Tap, but her character was cut out of the film. Cherie was considered for a part in the 1985 film Explorers but, according to her autobiography, she was in the throes of drug dependency and could not make it to a meeting.

=== Later years ===
Currie was a guest vocalist on Shameless's 2013 album, Beautiful Disaster. Currie released singles with ex-bandmate, Lita Ford and Glenn Danzig the same year. On October 19, 2013, Currie won the Rock Legend Award at the sixth annual Malibu Music Awards. The award was presented to her by ex-bandmate, Lita Ford. That night Currie and Ford played on stage together for the first time in 37 years. Currie released another studio album, Reverie, in 2015. The album features guest work from ex-bandmate, Lita Ford, Currie's son, Jake Hays, and Currie's ex-manager, Kim Fowley. Cherie toured the UK in November 2015, to support her new album. While in the UK, Currie recorded "Midnight Music In London", a live album that features a special live appearance by Suzi Quatro. It was released in 2016. In late May and early June 2016, Currie toured Australia and New Zealand. In 2018, Currie and her son were nominated for the Marshall Hawkins Award for Best Original Score for the film Take My Hand.

In 2019, Currie's album Blvds Of Splendor was released on April 13. The album featured guests including Slash, Billy Corgan, Juliette Lewis, and the Veronicas. On August 2, The Motivator, her album with Brie Darling, was released.

In 2020, Cherie Currie released an audio version of her memoir, Neon Angel. It reached number 1 on Amazon's Best Biographies of Punk Rock Musician. In the same year, Currie contributed her vocals to the song "Flatten the Curve" for the band FTC.

On April 27, 2025, Currie appeared as a speaker at a WalkAway campaign rally in Beverly Hills, alongside Matt Gaetz and conservative activists Jairo Tomico.

Currie is now a wood-carving artist, using a chainsaw to create her works. She has been doing chainsaw art since 2002 and opened her own gallery in 2005 in Chatsworth, California. As a chainsaw artist, Currie has competed in and won awards at three world Chainsaw Art competitions.

== Personal life ==
Currie struggled with drug addiction for much of her younger life, a major factor in the abrupt ending of her career. She wrote a memoir, Neon Angel, recounting life in the band and her traumatic experiences with drug addiction, sex abuse, and her broken family. In the 1980s, Currie began working in drug and psych facilities, later becoming a counsellor.

The Runaways, a 2010 biographical drama film executive-produced by Joan Jett, focuses on the group's beginnings and explores the relationship between Currie and Jett. Dakota Fanning portrays Currie.

Currie married actor Robert Hays on May 12, 1990, and they had one son together, the musician Jake Hays. Currie and Hays divorced in 1997.

In May 2024, Currie expressed support for Gays Against Groomers, an American far-right and anti-LGBTQ organisation, and collaborated with them on a range of merchandise campaigning against gender affirming care and the rights of trans people.

On October 18, 2026, Currie posted on social media "This is the video I posted a couple weeks ago that saved me. Please, if you have any of these symptoms, go to the hospital. Don't wait for appointments. Time is precious when it's a stroke. Love you all SO MUCH!!"It was confirmed by friends that Currie had suffered a minor stroke and was in the hospital. Her former Runaways bandmate Jackie Fox posted on social media "Wishing Cherie Currie well with her current health issues." Currie gave an update on October 20, 2026 saying "My X family. I was released from hospital yesterday but was too tired to let you know. I'll do a video tomorrow after some rest and quiet time to explain what is happening and why. Love you hugely. Big time."

== Influence on pop culture ==
In 1979, an alternative cover photo of Currie's album Beauty's only Skin Deep appears in the background of the feature film Rock 'n' Roll High School. It appears when the Ramones are backstage.

Characters in the 1997 film Gummo, sisters Dot, Helen, and Darby (played by Chloë Sevigny, Carisa Glucksman, and Darby Dougherty) were influenced by the Currie twins. Writer and director Harmony Korine, stated that, "Dot and Helen were based off a combination of Cherie and Marie Currie, home schooling, and the Shaggs."

In a season 3 episode of The O.C., Marissa makes an entrance to "Cherry Bomb". She does so while dressed in a provocative schoolgirl outfit.

== Discography ==
=== With the Runaways ===
==== Studio albums ====
- 1976 – The Runaways
- 1977 – Queens of Noise

==== Live albums ====
- 1977 – Live in Japan

=== Solo ===
==== Studio albums ====
- 1978 – Beauty's Only Skin Deep
- 1980 – Messin' with the Boys (with Marie Currie)
- 1998 – Young and Wild (with Marie Currie)
- 1999 – 80's Collection (with Marie Currie)
- 2015 – Reverie
- 2019 – Blvds of Splendor
- 2019 – The Motivator

==== Live albums ====
- 2013 – Live in Los Angeles 8/30/13
- 2016 – Midnight Music in London

==== EPs ====
- 2007 – Cherry Bomb

==== Guest appearances ====
- 1978 – Yesterday & Today – Struck Down
- 1981 – 707 – The Second Album
- 1984 – various artist – The Rosebud Beach Hotel Soundtrack (with Marie Currie)
- 1991 – various artist – Rich Girl Soundtrack
- 1990 – Tater Totz – Stereo: Sgt. Shonen's Exploding Plastic Eastman Band Request
- 1993 – Atsushi Yokozeki Project – Raid
- 1998 – Precious Metal – What You See Is What You Get: The Very Best of Precious Metal
- 2001 – Katt Lowe & the Othersyde – Katt Lowe & the Othersyde
- 2004 – Texas Terri Bomb! – Your Lips...
- 2006 – Rick Derringer – Rock 'n' Roll Hoochie Coo: The Best of Rick Derringer
- 2007 – Dee Dee Ramone / Johnny Ramone / Marky Ramone – Ramones Solo Performances
- 2008 – The Ramones – The Family Tree
- 2003 – The Streetwalkin' Cheetahs – Maximum Overdrive
- 2013 – Shameless – Beautiful Disaster
- 2013 – Warehouse 13 – Runaway
- 2013 – Glenn Danzig – "Some Velvet Morning"
- 2018 – Fanny Walked the Earth – "When We Need Her"
- 2020 – FTC – "Flatten the Curve"
- 2020 - Cherie Currie and Dave Schulz - "What The World Needs Now Is Love"
- 2020 - Ryan Cassidy - "Small Price (featuring Cherie Currie)"
- 2021 - Ryan Cassidy - "Second Chance (featuring Cherie Currie)"
- 2023 - Ten Cent Revenge - "Need To Know"

=== Singles ===
Year	Single	US	AUS	Album	Artist
1977	"Call Me at Midnight"	–	–	Beauty's Only Skin Deep	Cherie Currie
1978	"Beauty's Only Skin Deep"	–	–	Beauty's Only Skin Deep	Cherie Currie
1978	"Love at First Sight"	–	–	Beauty's Only Skin Deep	Cherie and Marie Currie
1978	"Science Fiction Daze"	–	–	Beauty's Only Skin Deep	Cherie Currie
1979	"Since You Been Gone"	95	86	Messin' with the Boys	Cherie and Marie Currie
1979	"Messin' with the Boys"	–	–	Messin' with the Boys	Cherie and Marie Currie
1980	"This Time"	–	–	Messin' with the Boys	Cherie and Marie Currie
1980	"Overnight Sensation (Hit Record)"	–	–	Messin' with the Boys	Cherie and Marie Currie
1989	"Instant Karma!"	–	–	Mono! Stereo: Sgt. Shonen's Exploding Plastic Eastman Band Request	Tater Totz featuring Cherie Currie
1998	"Cherry Bomb"	–	–	Maximum Overdrive	The Streetwalkin' Cheetahs meets Cherie Currie
2013	"Life's a Gas"	–	–	Beautiful Disaster	Shameless featuring Cherie Currie
2013	"Some Velvet Morning"	–	–	Single only	Glenn Danzig featuring Cherie Currie
2013	"Rock This Christmas Down"	–	–	Single only	Lita Ford and Cherie Currie
2015	"Believe"	–	–	Reverie	Cherie Currie
2018	"When We Need Her"	–	–	Fanny Walked the Earth	Fanny
2019	"The Motivator"	–	–	The Motivator	Cherie Currie and Brie Darling
2019	"Get Together"	–	–	The Motivator	Cherie Currie and Brie Darling
2020	"Black Hole Sun"	–	–	Single only	Cherie Currie and Brie Darling
2020	"What the World Needs Now Is Love"	–	–	Single only	Cherie Currie and Dave Schulz
2025	“When You’re Young”	-	-	Single Only	Cherie Currie and Essex

== Album charts ==
Year	Album	US	US Indie	Heatseekers Album	AUS	Artist
1978	Beauty's Only Skin Deep	102	-	-	81	Cherie Currie
1980	Messin' with the Boys	176	-	-	-	Cherie and Marie Currie
1997	Messin' with the Boys (Re-released)	-	-	-	-	Cherie and Marie Currie
1999	The 80's Collection	-	-	-	-	Cherie Currie; Cherie and Marie Currie
2015	Reverie	-	-	-	-	Cherie Currie
2016	Midnight Music in London	-	-	-	-	Cherie Currie
2019	Blvds of Splendor	-	-	-	-	Cherie Currie
2019	The Motivator	-	48	18	-	Cherie Currie and Brie Darling

== Filmography ==
Year	Film	Role	Notes
1974–1975	American Bandstand	Background Dancer, Herself	
1980	Foxes	Annie	
1982	Parasite	Dana	
1983	Twilight Zone: The Movie	Sara	Segment #3
1983	Wavelength	Iris Longacre	
1984	Murder, She Wrote	Echo Cramer	TV episode: "It's a Dog's Life"
1984	The Rosebud Beach Hotel	Singing Maid Cherie	Her twin Marie Currie played Singing Maid Marie.
1990	Matlock	Renee Thorton	2 episodes: "The Informer: Part 1" and "The Informer: Part 2"
1991	Matlock	Betsy Rhodes	TV episode: "The Suspect"
1991	Rich Girl	Michelle	
1992	Dr. Giggles	ADR voice	
2004	Getting the Knack	Herself	documentary
2005	Edgeplay: A Film About the Runaways	Herself	Film by former Runaways bassist Victory Tischler-Blue documenting the Runaways' musical history.
2013	Hansel and Gretel: Warriors of Witchcraft	Ms. Thoman	Direct-to-DVD release
2013	Warehouse 13	Herself	TV episode "Runaway"
2014	Keeping up with the Kardashians	Herself	
2014	Glory Days	Herself	
2017	Under the Influence – Glam Rock	Herself	documentary
2018	Bad Reputation	Herself	documentary
2019	Suzi Q	Herself	documentary

== Bibliography ==
Year	Book	L.A. Weekly	author(s)	notes
1989	Neon Angel	-	Cherie Currie, Neal Shusterman	author
2008	Cherry Bomb	-	Carrie Borzillo-Vrenna	contributor
2010	Neon Angel (Re-released)	9	Cherie Currie, Tony O'Neill	author
2014	The Narrow Road of Light	-	Marie Currie	developer
