= WalkAway campaign =

American political social-media campaign

#WalkAway campaign
- Formation: May 26, 2018; 8 years ago
- Founder: Brandon Straka
- Location: United States, Canada
- Website: www.walkawaycampaign.com

The #WalkAway campaign is a social media campaign that was launched ahead of the United States 2018 mid-term elections with the stated purpose of encouraging voters to leave the Democratic Party. The campaign, which also organized events to support Donald Trump, was noted and criticized for its astroturfing methods and the claim that there was a popular movement of people leaving the party.

In 2021, the group's founder, Brandon Straka, a hairstylist and aspiring actor living in New York City, participated in the 2021 United States Capitol attack. Following this, the group's Facebook page, which had more than half a million followers, was closed for violations of the site's terms of service.

== Organization ==
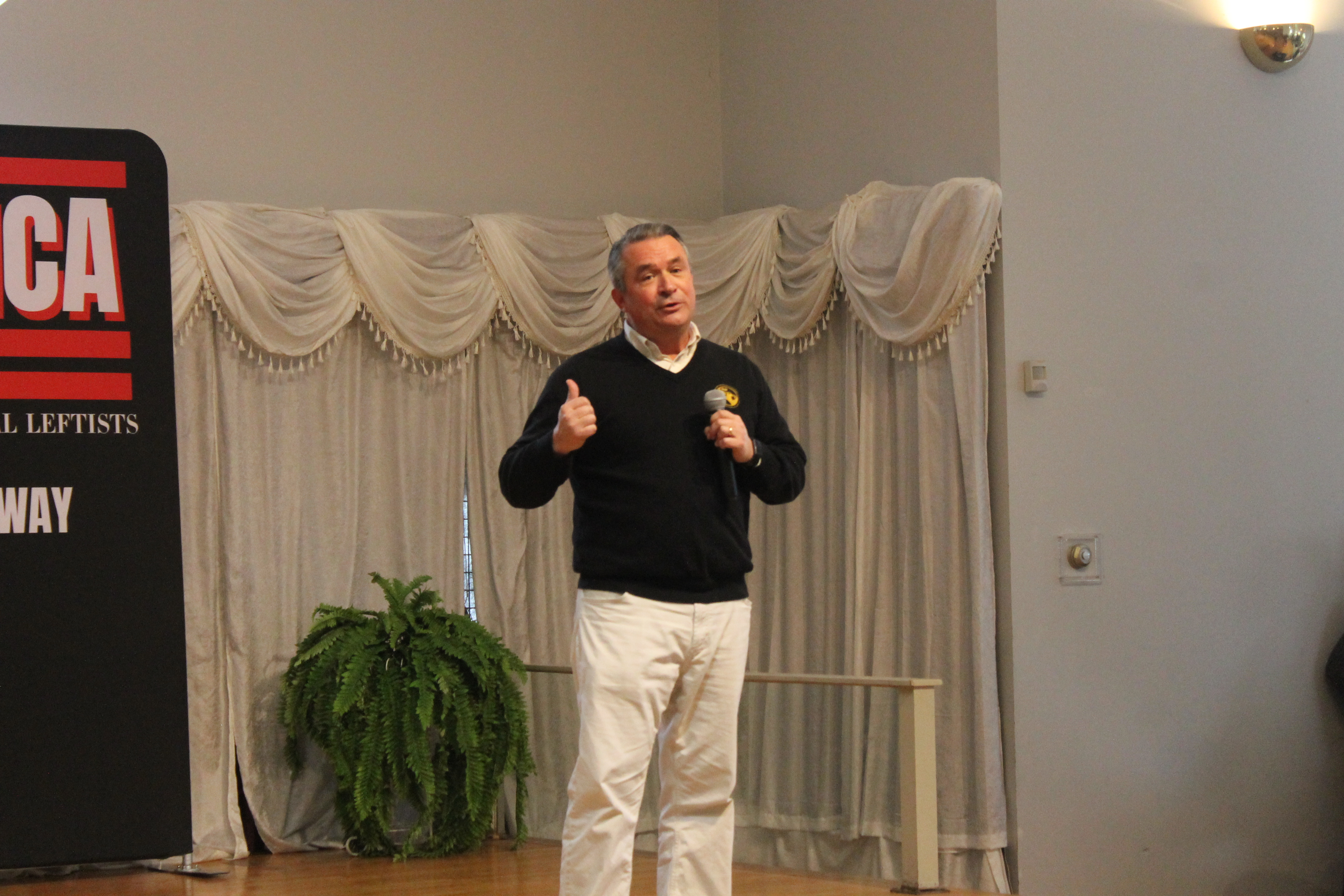
U.S. Representative Don Bacon speaking at a WalkAway rally in Omaha, Nebraska, in October 2020

The campaign is set up as a foundation and a political action committee:

- The #WalkAway Foundation is a registered 501(c)(3) organization defined as an Alliance/Advocacy Organizations within the Public, Society Benefit - Multipurpose and Other category. The IRS ruling year for tax exemption was 2019. While no IRS annual return is on file for 2019, the 2018 filing shows contributions of $97,950 with officers reported as Brandon Straka, chairman; Maria Albanese, director, and Tracy Diaz, director. As of October 28, 2020, the foundation was involved in an online fundraising campaign through classy.org which had raised nearly $125,000.
- The PAC is set up as #Walkaway Campaign PAC and shows receipts of $29,000 through the 2020 cycle. The FEC registration is C00718197 and the treasurer of the PAC is indicated as Dan Backer.

=== Methods and fundraising ===
Observers and commentators have raised doubts as to what extent #WalkAway Campaign is an example of astroturfing rather than a genuine grassroots movement. Soon after its founding in 2018, WalkAway received a $10,000 (~$12,267 in 2024) donation from Alex Jones and InfoWars. In 2019, Straka said WalkAway does not receive major donations and that "everything is grassroots support from Americans who send us $5 or $100." In May 2020, OpenSecrets reported that of the $20,104 donated to WalkAway in 2020, a total of $7,521 was contributed by nine donors who gave $200 or more. One was Straka himself.

== Activities ==
In the run-up to the 2020 United States presidential election, the WalkAway campaign held rallies and marches in various cities, an effort to get people to vote for President Donald Trump. In August 2019, Straka opened for Trump at a rally in Cincinnati. In August 2020, the WalkAway campaign held a rally in West Hollywood, California. Nearly 300 demonstrators attended, including YouTuber Joy Villa. Many held flags and signs supportive of Trump and critical of the Democratic Party. On September 5, the campaign held a rally in Dallas, Texas, during which a Black Lives Matter counter-protester was arrested for misdemeanor assault. On October 3, 2020, Straka held a rally in Washington, D.C. at the Sylvan Theater on the grounds of the Washington Monument. Featured speakers included U.S. Representative Dan Crenshaw, actor Lorenzo Lamas, and British social media influencer Katie Hopkins.

He remained active after the 2020 election. In 2025, the WalkAway Campaign launched the American Restoration Tour to encourage voters to leave the Democratic Party and support conservative candidates, targeting states like California, New Jersey, and Virginia. On April 27, 2025, a rally was held in Beverly Hills, California, with speakers including former U.S. Representative Matt Gaetz, conservative media influencer Jairo Tomico and musician Cherie Currie. The event aimed to mobilize voters for future elections.

=== Straka's participation in the 2021 Capitol attack ===
Straka attended the 2021 United States Capitol attack and spoke to crowds on January 5 where he referred to the audience as "patriots" and referred repeatedly to a "revolution". He also told the attendees to "fight back" and added, "We are sending a message to the Democrats, we are not going away, you've got a problem!"

The next day, he urged protestors to take away a police officer's shield, shouting "Take it away from him" and "Take it! Take it!" Later, as others tried to charge through the entrance to the Capitol, he shouted, "Go! Go!" In a "Stop the Steal" group chat, Straka messaged fellow organizers as the Capitol was being overrun, writing: "Fuck no!! I'm at the Capitol and just joined the breach!!! I just got gassed! Never felt so fucking alive in my life!!!"

On January 8, Facebook closed the #WalkAway page, which had more than half a million followers at the time. The page was replaced with a message from Facebook saying the page had violated its terms of use. The shutdown came in the wake of the Capitol attack, when Facebook and other social media platforms increased their enforcement of terms of service that ban the incitement of violence. Facebook said the page violated a policy on content that was, "hateful, threatening, or obscene".

On January 25, Straka was arrested in Nebraska by the FBI for "impeding law enforcement officers during civil disorder" and unlawful entry into a restricted building, as well as disorderly conduct in relation to his role in the violent disturbance. He pleaded guilty to a lesser misdemeanor charge in October 2021, which could be punishable by up to six months in prison, and agreed to provide private social media and other evidence to investigators. Prosecutors postponed Straka's December 2021 sentencing for thirty days to evaluate evidence he had provided. Straka was later sentenced to three years of probation for his role in the Capitol riot.

Straka attended the Conservative Political Action Conference in 2022, where he appeared in a cage wearing an orange jumpsuit despite never serving time in jail for the Capitol attack. At one point U.S. Representative Marjorie Taylor Greene entered the cage and prayed with him. He also made an appearance at CPAC 2023; alongside fellow rioters Derrick Evans and Simone Gold, he was a speaker at a session titled "True Stories of January 6: The Prosecuted Speak".

On January 20, 2025, Straka received a federal pardon, along with nearly every other participant in the Capitol attack, in Trump's pardon of January 6 United States Capitol attack defendants on the first day of his second presidency.

== Reactions ==
In 2018, progressive commentator David A. Love of CNN condemned the campaign as "pure propaganda [and] a psychological operation."

That same year, Abby Ohlheiser wrote in The Washington Post, "There's little actual evidence to suggest that #WalkAway represents a mass conversion of millions – or even thousands – of Democrats" and contrasted the broad appeal of true viral videos with the "Conservative Internet viral" nature of the WalkAway video. ThinkProgress characterized the campaign as "a grifting operation," noting efforts by the organizers to sell dinner packages priced in the hundreds of dollars to march attendees.

Slate journalist Mark Joseph Stern accused Straka of presenting royalty-free stock images from Shutterstock and claiming they were of people who had left the Democratic Party, though Straka denied that any such material originated from the WalkAway campaign. Fact-checking website Snopes stated that it could not determine whether or not this use of stock images had originated from campaign organizers.

== See also ==
- Candace Owens § BLEXIT Foundation
