= Elisabeth Wärnfeldt =

Swedish author, opera and concert singer (born 1956)

Siv Elisabeth Margaretha Wärnfeldt (born 1956) is a Swedish author, opera and concert singer.

== Education and career ==
Wärnfeldt took a bachelor's degree at Stockholm University in music, art and theatre science in 1979. She wrote her dissertation on the Swedish composer Torbjörn Iwan Lundquist. She studied music and voice at the University of Music and Performing Arts, Vienna, Austria. For many years her vocal teacher was the Hovsångare (Swedish court singer) Birgit Nilsson. In 1986, Wärnfeldt was awarded both the Birgit Nilsson Prize and the Wagner Prize. Her opera debut in 1989 was in the part of Halka at the Silesian Opera in Bytom, Poland. Wärnfeldt has since sung, among others, the part of Donna Anna in Mozart's Don Giovanni at the Södra Teatern, directed by Johannes Schaaf. Other notable parts are Anna Bolena in Gaetano Donizetti's Anna Bolena, Contessa in Mozart's The Marriage of Figaro, Rosalinda in Strauss's Die Fledermaus and Leonore in Verdi's Il trovatore.

Wärnfeldt has written several articles since her time at the university of Stockholm and has also been a guest lecturer at the University of Vienna, and at the Royal College of Music, Stockholm. In 2012, she received an M.Phil. from the Åbo Akademi University. Wärnfeldt is a member of the Swedish writers' union, Sveriges Författarförbund.

== Texts and libretti written by Wärnfeldt ==
- It's like the light, a scenic novel by Elisabeth Wärnfeldt based on the poems by Emily Dickinson. Music by Kai Nieminen and produced by Staffan Aspegren
- Symphony No. 231, "About Völvan..." with music by Leif Segerstam
- She, with music by Leif Segerstam
- Road map..., with music by Leif Segerstam
- Völvan, with music by Leif Segerstam
- Symphony No. 232, with music by Leif Segerstam
- Symphony No. 233, with music by Leif Segerstam
- Symphony No. 234, with music by Leif Segerstam
- Symphony No. 241, with music by Leif Segerstam
- Symphony No. 242, with music by Leif Segerstam
- Symphony No. 246, with music by Leif Segerstam
- Requiem, "Per-Olof Gillblad in memoriam" with music by Leif Segerstam

== Books ==
- 1985 – Solvarv
- 1997 – Anna och Herr Gud
- 2011 – Red

== Music written for, dedicated to or first performed by Wärnfeldt ==
- Torbjörn Iwan Lundquist – Siebenmal Rilke, songs for soprano and piano or orchestra
- Torbjörn Iwan Lundquist – A new gospel, to texts by Dag Hammarskjöld and Leo Tolstoy
- Jan Wallgren – Boye-sånger, to the poems by Karin Boye
- Boel Dirke – Damen det brinner, a jazz opera, to texts by Bodil Malmsten
- Hans Ove Olsson – Petrarca Sonett for song and piano, to text by Petrarch
- Olov Olofsson – 700 days, a scenic oratorio, to text by Maria Jacobs
- Monica Dominique – Mr God it's Anna, playing the part of the Mum
- Josef Stolz – Kind und Tod, to texts by Hugo Ball
- Ulf Johansson – Lobeshymnus, to texts by Rainer Maria Rilke
- Lars Jergen Olson – Vägmärken, to texts by Dag Hammarskjöld
- Lars Jergen Olson – Fem Kärlekssånger, to texts by Maria Wine
- Lars Jergen Olson – Sex sånger, to texts by J.L. Runeberg
- Lars Jergen Olson – Requiem (recorded but not yet performed)
- Stefan Säfsten – Tre nya sånger, to texts by Dag Hammarskjöld and Nelson Mandela
- Stefan Säfsten – Stormen for Soprano and Saxophone quartet, to texts by Ebba Lindqvist
- The part of Witwe Bolte in Alexander Blechinger’s Max And Moritz to libretto by Wilhelm Busch at the St. Margarethen Opera Festival, world opening 17 June 2008

== Discography ==
- 2000 – Monica Dominique: Herr Gud, det är Anna (Mr God it's Anna)
- 2005 – Reflection; songs by Lars Jergen Olson
- 2006 – Opera album Homage to Birgit Nilsson with Moravian Philharmonic Orchestra conducted by Peter Schmelzer
- 2007 – Lights in Wintertime Christmas carols with the Högalidskyrkan Choir conducted by Anna Lena Engström
- 2008 – Songs of love with Franz Liszt's Petrarca Sonnets among others, pianist Stefan Nymark
- 2008 – Felix Mendelssohn's Hear my prayer with Kinna kyrkokör conducted by Hans Åke Månsson
- 2008 – Alexander Blechinger’s Max and Moritz
