= Marie Currie =

American singer (born 1959)

- Born: November 30, 1959 (age 66)
- Genres: Punk rock; hard rock
- Occupations: Musician; singer; songwriter; actress; artist; producer; poet
- Instrument: Vocals
- Years active: 1977–present
- Spouse: Steve Lukather (m. 1981; div. 1990)

Marie Currie (born November 30, 1959) is an American singer, songwriter, actress, and artist. Currie is best known for playing in a band with her twin Cherie Currie, called Cherie & Marie Currie. Their song "Since You Been Gone" charted at number 95 on the US charts. Marie played Singing Maid Marie in The Rosebud Beach Hotel and is now a multi-media sculptor and artist.

== Early life ==
Currie was born to Don Currie and actress Marie Harmon. She was raised in Encino with three siblings. Her brother is Don Currie Jr. She has an elder sister, actress Sondra Currie, and a twin sister, Cherie Currie. Marie was the first twin born.

Currie and her twin sister were given roles on an episode of My Three Sons at the age of two. They were supposed to sing "Twinkle, Twinkle, Little Star" with Fred MacMurray, but froze during filming, and their part was cut from the show. Before Currie and her sister rose to fame, they appeared on American Bandstand as background dancers.

== Career ==
While her sister Cherie was in the Runaways, Currie worked at a fast-food restaurant. She started the Marie Currie Band, but they never released a record. They were featured in magazine articles across the U.S. and Japan. She started her career as a singer by singing a duet with Cherie called "Love at First Sight". The song appeared on Cherie's debut album Beauty's Only Skin Deep.

In 1979, Cherie and Marie released two singles, "Messin' with the Boys" and "Since You Been Gone". The latter reached number 95 on U.S. charts. In 1980, Cherie and Marie released their album, Messin' with the Boys, and the album received more radio play than Beauty's Only Skin Deep. They released another single that year titled "This Time".

Cherie and Marie performed on television shows in the 1980s, including Sha Na Na, The Mike Douglas Show, and The Merv Griffin Show In 1984, they played the singing maids in The Rosebud Beach Hotel. The twins sang, wrote, and produced songs for the film and its soundtrack, That film was Marie's acting debut. In 1991, they performed at a tribute concert to Paula Pierce, a member of the Pandoras. For the final performance, the remaining Pandoras backed the Curries.

Currie performed with her sister's band, the Runaways, at a reunion that included Jackie Fox and Sandy West. In 1997, she worked as a mortgage banker, along with her brother Don. She later became a sales and branch development manager for a lending company founded by her brother.

In 1997, Cherie and Marie re-released Messin' with the Boys with seven bonus tracks, In 1998, they held a concert at the Golden Apple in support of the re-release, Cherie's ex-bandmate West joined Cherie on stage to perform some of the Runaways songs. In 1998, Cherie and Marie released a compilation called Young and Wild, In 1999, Rocket City Records released Cherie's album The 80's Collection. The album features guest work done by Marie.

== Later years ==
On January 30, 2014, her novel The Narrow Road of Light was published.

== Personal life ==
Currie dated Toto guitarist Steve Lukather in the late 70s, and they got married on November 7, 1981. They had two children, Tina (born May 13, 1985) and Trevor (born May 4, 1987). Currie and Lukather divorced in 1990.

In 2014, they appeared on the cover of Steel Notes Magazine (alongside singer Debbie Harry, and model Josi Kat) with a lengthy feature story on her life and work featured in the issue.

== References in pop culture ==
On the cover of the Runaways "Neon Angels on the Roads to Ruin" single Currie's twin is wearing a shirt with Marie's name on it.

Currie's then husband, Steve Lukather, wrote and dedicated Toto's songs, "I Won't Hold You Back" and "I'll Be Over You" to her.

Harmony Korine has stated that the characters Dot and Helen Darby (played by Chloë Sevigny and Carisa Glucksman) in his 1997 film Gummo "were based off [sic] a combination of Cherie and Marie Currie, home schooling, and the Shaggs."

In 2018, a photo of Marie Currie appeared in Bad Reputation, a documentary about the career of Cherie's ex-bandmate, Joan Jett. In the documentary, Kim Fowley tells the story of how he would not allow them both to join the Runaways because he did not want a set of identical twins being backed by an all-girl rock band. Therefore, only Cherie joined.

Currie was portrayed by Riley Keough in the film The Runaways, about the band of the same name.

== Discography ==
=== Studio albums ===
- 1980 – Messin' with the Boys
- 1997 – Messin' with the Boys (re-release)
- 1998 – Young and Wild (compilation)
- 1999 – The 80's Collection

=== Guest appearances ===
- 1978 – Cherie Currie – Beauty's Only Skin Deep
- 1984 – various artist – The Rosebud Beach Hotel Soundtrack

=== Singles ===
Year	Single	US	CAN	Album	Artist	Ref
1978	"Love at First Sight"	—	—	Beauty's Only Skin Deep	Cherie Currie	
1979	"Since You Been Gone"	95	86	Messin' with the Boys	Cherie and Marie Currie	
1979	"Messin' with the Boys"	—	—	Messin' with the Boys	Cherie and Marie Currie	
1980	"This Time"	—	—	Messin' with the Boys	Cherie and Marie Currie	
1980	"Overnight Sensation (Hit Record)"	—	—	Messin' with the Boys	Cherie and Marie Currie	

== Album charts ==
Year	Album	US	AUS	Artist	Ref
1978	Beauty's Only Skin Deep	102	81	Cherie Currie	
1980	Messin' with the Boys	176	—	Cherie and Marie Currie	
1997	Messin' with the Boys (Re-released)	—	—	Cherie and Marie Currie	
1999	The 80's Collection	—	—	Cherie Currie; Cherie and Marie Currie	

== Filmography ==
Year	Film	Role	Notes
1974–1975	American Bandstand	Background Dancer, Herself	
1984	The Rosebud Beach Hotel	Singing Maid Marie	Her twin Cherie played Singing Maid Cherie.
1991	Eureka Water	herself	commercial

== Bibliography ==
Year	Book	L.A. Weekly
2014	The Narrow Road of Light	—
