= Messin' with the Boys =

Studio album by Cherie & Marie Currie
- Released: 1980 (re-released in 1997)
- Recorded: 1979, 1980
- Studios: Davlen Sound Studios, North Hollywood, California; Studio 55, Los Angeles
- Genres: Rock; hard rock
- Length: 41:11
- Label: Capitol (re-released by Renaissance Records)
- Producer: Jai Winding

Cherie & Marie Currie chronology
Beauty's Only Skin Deep (Cherie Currie) (1978)	Messin' with the Boys (1980)	Young and Wild (Cherie & Marie Currie) (1998)

Professional ratings
Review scores
Source	Rating
AllMusic	3/5 stars

Messin' with the Boys (1980) is the second album by American singer Cherie Currie, and the first to feature her sister Marie Currie as a major contributor. Their band was called Cherie and Marie Currie. Marie was a guest vocalist on Cherie's first album, so Marie went on tour with Cherie to support her first album, Beauty's Only Skin Deep. When Marie would join Cherie on stage to sing the encores, the audience would go wild. Cherie then ran with the idea that two blonds are better than one. The idea paid off because Messin' with the Boys received more radio play than Beauty's Only Skin Deep, and their song "Since You Been Gone" made it to 95 on US charts. The single "This Time" and the album Messin' with the Boys made the top 200 on U.S. charts. This makes Messin' with the Boys Cherie Currie's most successful solo album. "I Just Love the Feeling" originally surfaced on the 1976 album, S.S. Fools by the group of the same name. Cherie duetted with that group's and Toto's lead singer, Bobby Kimball, and wrote the additional lyrics in the second verse. The album also features much contribution from members of Toto, as she was in a relationship with guitarist Steve Lukather at the time. Toto founder David Paich wrote the song "Elaine".

Messin' with the Boys was originally released by Capitol Records in 1980, but was re-released on Renaissance Records in 1997. For the 1997 re-release, the twins recorded seven new bonus tracks, tracks 11 through 17. One of the bonus tracks is "Cherry Bomb", a song Cherie recorded with the Runaways. When Cherie was in the Runaways, it was regarded as their signature song.

In 1988, singer Tone Norum covered Cherie and Marie Currie's song "This Time". She named her album after that song. "This Time" was also covered by the UK band Smart.

== Marie Currie's quotes ==
When Brad Hamlin asked Marie Currie, "Tell us how Messin' with the Boys came about", Marie replied: "That's a very long story, but I still to this day believe it is one of the best albums we could've made. We had the best musicians, songwriters, and a tremendous amount of support. I look back at recording that album with a smile."

== Track listing ==
1. "Messin' with the Boys" (Joey Brasler, M. Ruth) – 3:47
2. "Since You Been Gone" (Russ Ballard) – 3:41
3. "I Just Love the Feeling" (featuring Bobby Kimball) (Bobby Kimball, Cherie Currie) – 4:32
4. "All I Want" (John Batdorf, Sue Sheridan) – 3:40
5. "Overnight Sensation (Hit Record)" (Eric Carmen) – 5:01
6. "Elaine" (David Paich) – 3:20
7. "This Time" (Billy Bizeau) – 6:08
8. "Wishing Well" (John Bundrick, Simon Kirke, Paul Kossoff, Paul Rodgers, Tetsu Yamauchi) – 3:27
9. "Secrets" (Cherie Currie, Michelle Winding) – 2:26
10. "We're Through" (Joey Brasler) – 5:13
11. "Kamakazee Lover" (Joey Brasler, Stephen G. Crane) - 3:33 (1997 Bonus track)
12. "I Surrender" (Russ Ballard) - 3:48 (1997 Bonus track)
13. "Prisoner" (DB Cooper, James Lance) - 3:29 (1997 Bonus track)
14. "You're a Baby" (Joey Brasler, B. Berkowitz) - 3:34 (1997 Bonus track)
15. "Tough Break" (S. Dunscombe-Lynch, L. Whitman) - 3:50 (1997 Bonus track)
16. "Always the Last to Know" (Joey Brasler, Cherie Currie) - 3:09 (1997 Bonus track)
17. "Cherry Bomb" (Joan Jett, Kim Fowley) - 2:13 (1997 Bonus track)

== Singles ==
Year	Single	US	CAN	Album
1979	"Since You Been Gone"	95	86	Messin' with the Boys
1980	"Messin' with the Boys"	-	-	Messin' with the Boys
1980	"This Time"	-	-	Messin' with the Boys

== Album ==
Year	Albumb	US
1980	Messin' with the Boys	176

== Personnel ==
- Cherie Currie - vocals
- Marie Currie - vocals
- Steve Lukather - guitar
- Waddy Wachtel - guitar
- Joey Brasler - guitar
- Mike Porcaro - bass guitar
- Mike Baird - drums
- Jai Winding - synthesizer, keyboards
- Trevor Veitch - acoustic guitar on "Since You've Been Gone"
- John Pierce - bass guitar on "We're Through"
- Mike Landau - guitar on "We're Through"
- Bobby Kimball - male lead vocal on "I Just Love the Feeling"
- Bill Champlin, Tom Kelly, Bobby Kimball, Keith Landry, Tommy Funderburk, Tom Werman - backing vocals

== Production ==
- Producer: Jai Winding
- Assistant producer: Michele Winding
