= Beauty's Only Skin Deep =

Studio album by Cherie Currie
- Released: 1978
- Recorded: 1977
- Genre: Pop rock
- Length: 35:44
- Label: PolyGram
- Producer: David Carr and Kim Fowley

Cherie Currie chronology
Beauty's Only Skin Deep (1978)	Messin' with the Boys (1980)

Professional ratings
Review scores
Source	Rating
AllMusic	3/5 stars

Beauty's Only Skin Deep is the debut solo album by Cherie Currie, recorded during September–October 1977, and released in 1978. Kim Fowley and David Carr co-produced the effort. Mercury Records opted not to release the album in the United States. The record was released in France, and in Japan with a lyrics sheet. The title track was released as a seven-inch single in the Netherlands, backed with "Young and Wild", while "Call Me at Midnight" was released as a single in the UK.

AllMusic said that the album was somewhat unfocused, a collection of various songs that were not so successful at what they were attempting. The album was described as primarily pop rock with a few hints of new wave influence.

"Love at First Sight" was a duet between Cherie and her twin sister, Marie Currie. The song was released as a seven-inch single in Japan. For the flip-side, Cherie and Marie performed the same song in Japanese.

"Science Fiction Daze" was another Japanese single, backed with "The Only One".

== Cherie Currie's quotes ==
In an interview Cherie did with Marie in Japan, Cherie graded this album 50 out of 100. She was asked "In which points did you put your emphasis producing this album?" She says "It's a very well produced album by David Carr. Kim Fowley did not produce this album. He has his name on it for producing, but he did not produce it." In Cherie's book Neon Angel Cherie says the only two songs that "really stand out on this album for me, each for very different reasons. 'Science Fiction Daze' was my favorite. It was the closest I ever came to recording something that really brought me back to my Bowie roots. We bathed the song in trippy Moog synthesizers, and I was very happy with my vocals on that one. The other song was 'Love at First Sight'. When Cherie was in the Runaways, Kim Fowley told the people of Japan Cherie did not have an identical twin. Then he would send out a conflicting story that Marie was real, and we were going to play some shows in Japan together. By the time he was done, there was hysterical anticipation for me to return to prove once and for all whether there really were two Currie sisters. 'Love at First Sight' would be the song that we performed together."

== Track listing ==
1. "Call Me at Midnight" (Steven T.) – 3:21
2. "I Surrender" (Billy Bizeau) – 3:46
3. "Beauty's Only Skin Deep" (Cherie Currie, David Carr, Kim Fowley) – 3:51
4. "I Will Still Love You" (Robert Strauss) – 3:33
5. "Science Fiction Daze" (Steven T., Kim Fowley) – 4:06
6. "I Like the Way You Dance" (Steven T.) – 3:09
7. "That's the Kind of Guy I Like" (Steven T.) – 3:14
8. "Love at First Sight" (Billy Bizeau) – 4:01
9. "The Only One" (Cherie Currie, Steven T.) – 3:45
10. "Young and Wild" (Steven T., Kim Fowley) – 2:52

== Personnel ==
- Cherie Currie - vocals
- Steven T. - guitars, vocals
- Dan Ferguson - guitars
- Thom Rotella - guitars
- Moose McCains - bass, vocals
- Sal Maida - bass
- David Hungate - bass
- Willy Ornellas - drums, percussion
- Billy Thomas - drums
- Marie Currie - producing, harmony vocals on tracks 2, 3, 4, and 9, and lead vocal on "Love at First Sight"

== Production ==
- Producer: David Carr and Kim Fowley
- Engineer: Taavi Mote
- Design: Masao Ohgiya
- Photography: Lorrie Sullivan
