= Rêverie (Scriabin) =

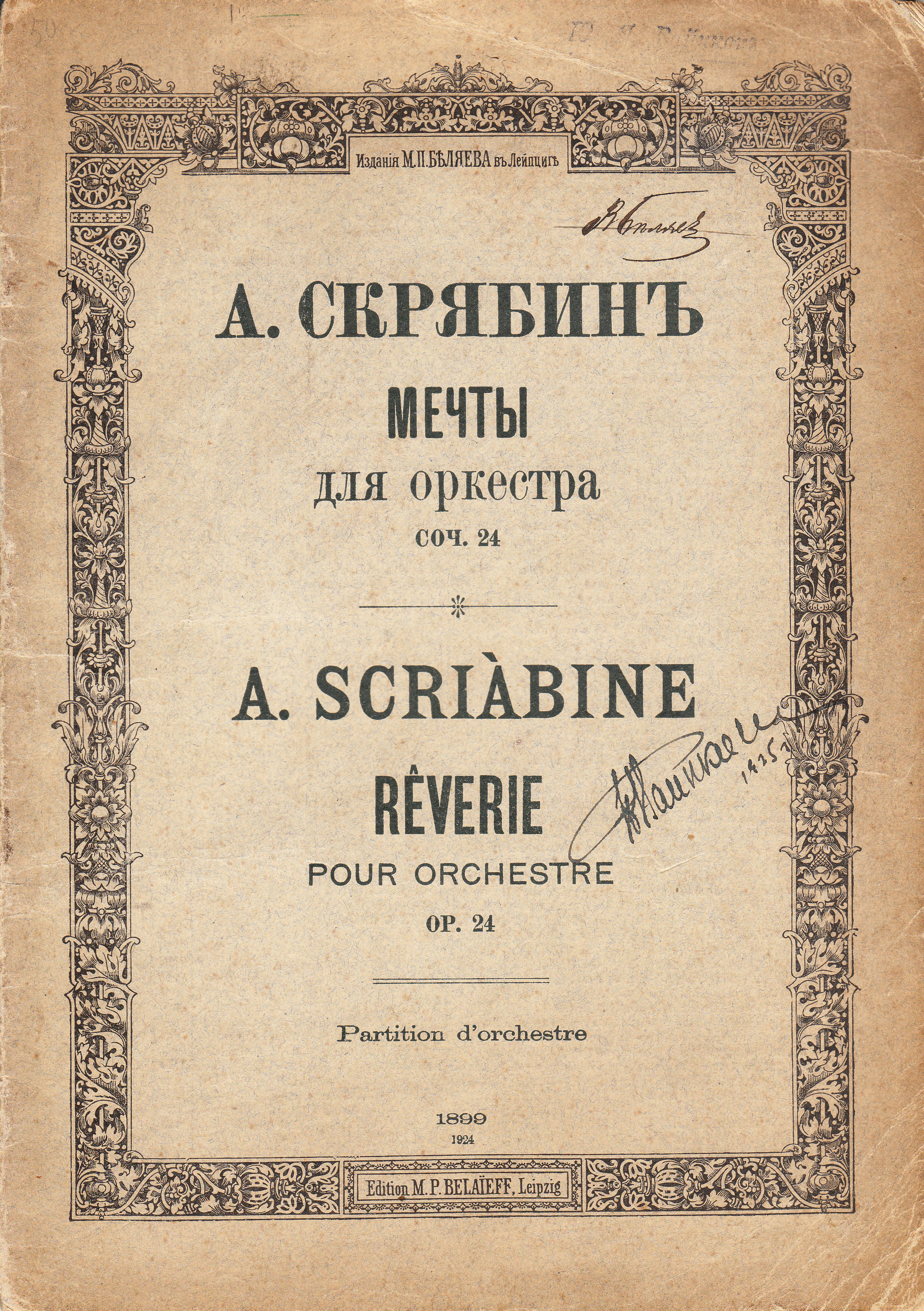

Rêverie, Op. 24, is an orchestral work composed by Alexander Scriabin in 1898. A typical performance lasts from 3 to 5 minutes. Scriabin, who was a pianist, had never before composed for orchestra, except for a few unpublished works. However, he composed the work in total secrecy, without any advice.

== Composition ==
In November 1898, when Scriabin went to Saint Petersburg, he brought a present for his patron and publisher M.P. Belaïeff. The offer was the full score of an orchestral work named Prélude, a short miniature in E minor and ternary form.

One day, his friend Nikolay Rimsky-Korsakov came to visit him and played the work on the piano. He deemed it Delightful, wheated in piquant harmonies and not badly orchestrated. Since Belaïeff thought the French title Prélude did not fit an orchestral work, he and Scriabin decided to rename it Rêverie. As Belaïeff's editions were published in French (or German) and Russian, they further discussed about the Slavic title. They had to choose between mechty (daydreams) or gryozy (musings). They agreed on the first. After hearing the rehearsals, Scriabin wrote:

"Imagine my joy, the piece sounds very well. At the rehearsal on 1 December Korsakov was so sweet. He had each section go through its parts separately and spent a whole hour in it [...]"

The piece was premièred on 5 December 1898 in Saint Petersburg after Balakirev's Tamara. It was very well received, and Rimsky-Korsakov had to encore it. After this, Scriabin played a selection of his études, préludes and impromptus at the piano.
