= Lita Ford discography =

This is the discography for British-American rock musician Lita Ford.

== Studio albums ==
Title	Album details	Peak chart positions							Certifications (sales threshold)
Title	Album details	UK	AUS	US	US Indie	NZ	SWE	SWI	Certifications (sales threshold)
Out for Blood	Release date: May 1983; Label: Mercury	—	—	—	—	—	—	—	
Dancin' on the Edge	Release date: May 1984; Label: Mercury	96	—	66	—	—	—	—	
Lita	Release date: February 1988; Label: RCA	58	74	29	—	45	—	—	MC: Gold; RIAA: Platinum
Stiletto	Release date: May 1990; Label: RCA	66	77	52	—	—	36	26	
Dangerous Curves	Release date: October 1991; Label: RCA	51	172	132	—	—	—	—	
Black	Release date: 14 February 1995; Label: ZYX	—	—	—	—	—	—	—	
Wicked Wonderland	Release date: 6 October 2009; Label: JLRG Entertainment	—	—	—	38	—	—	—	
Living Like a Runaway	Release date: 19 June 2012; Label: SPV / Steamhammer	—	—	—	—	—	—	—	
Time Capsule	Release date: 20 May 2016 (UK); Label: SPV / Steamhammer	—	—	—	—	—	—	—	
"—" denotes releases that did not chart

== Live albums ==
- Greatest Hits Live! (2000)
- Kiss Me Deadly – Live (pink vinyl LP) – Cleopatra Records cat # CLP 2036 (2007)
- The Bitch Is Back ... Live (October 22, 2013, in North America)

== Compilation albums ==
- The Best of Lita Ford (1992)
- Greatest Hits (1993)
- Platinum and Gold Collection – The Best of Lita Ford (2004)
- Nobody's Child (2012)

== Other appearances ==
- "Sunset and Babylon", W.A.S.P. single (1993)
- "Herman's Head Season 2 Episode 24 "Love Me Two Timer" May 2, as herself [1993)
- A Future to This Life: Robocop – The Series Soundtrack; performs title track with Joe Walsh (1995)
- "Whole Lotta Love" and "Rock and Roll" with various artist on A Tribute to Led Zeppelin (1997)
- "I Want to Be Loved" with "LOU" on The Other Side (2005)
- "I'll Be Home for Christmas" with Twisted Sister on A Twisted Christmas (2006)
- "Brütal Legend" Video Game (2009)
- "Big Time Rush" Big Time Moms Mothers Day Special, appearing as herself (2011)
- Guest appearance on Geoff Tate's version of Queensrÿche's Frequency Unknown (2013)
- "American Nights" and "Is It Day or Night" with Cherie Currie on Reverie (March 16, 2015)
- "Wild Thing" (The Troggs cover) on Ace Frehley's cover album, Origins, Vol. 1 (2016)
- "Jumpin' Jack Flash" (The Rolling Stones cover) on Ace Frehley's cover album, Origins, Vol. 2 (2020)

== Singles ==
Year	Single	Peak chart positions						Certifications (sales threshold)	Album
Year	Single	US	US Main	AUS	NZ	UK	SWE	Certifications (sales threshold)	Album
1983	"Out for Blood"	—	—	—	—	—	—		Out for Blood
1983	"Dressed to Kill"	—	—	—	—	—	—		Dancin' on the Edge
1984	"Fire in My Heart"	—	—	—	—	—	—		Dancin' on the Edge
1984	"Gotta Let Go"	—	51	—	—	94	—		Dancin' on the Edge
1988	"Kiss Me Deadly"	12	40	97	21	75	—		Lita
1988	"Back to the Cave"	—	22	—	—	—	—		Lita
1989	"Close My Eyes Forever" (with Ozzy Osbourne)	8	25	—	16	47	14	RIAA: Gold	Lita
1989	"Falling in and Out of Love"	—	37	—	—	—	—		Lita
1990	"Hungry"	98	14	137	—	76	—		Stiletto
1990	"Lisa"	—	—	—	—	—	—		Stiletto
1991	"Shot of Poison"	45	21	—	—	63	—		Dangerous Curves
1992	"Playing with Fire"	—	—	—	—	—	—		Dangerous Curves
1992	"Larger Than Life"	—	—	—	—	—			Dangerous Curves
1995	"Killin' Kind"	—	—	—	—	—	—		Black
2009	"Crave"	—	—	—	—	—	—		Wicked Wonderland
2012	"Living Like a Runaway"	—	—	—	—	—	—		Living Like a Runaway
2012	"Mother"	—	—	—	—	—	—		Living Like a Runaway
2013	"Rock This Christmas Down" (with Cherie Currie)	—	—	—	—	—	—		Single Only
2016	"Rotten To The Core"	—	—	—	—	—	—		Time Capsule
"—" denotes releases that did not chart
