= The Bitch Is Back ... Live =

Live album by Lita Ford
- Released: October 22, 2013
- Recorded: October 2012
- Genre: Heavy metal, hard rock
- Length: 57:00
- Label: SPV/Steamhammer
- Producer: Bobby Collin, Lita Ford

Lita Ford chronology
Living Like a Runaway (2012)	The Bitch Is Back ... Live (2013)	Time Capsule (2016)

The Bitch Is Back ... Live is the second live album by Lita Ford. The album is named after the Elton John song "The Bitch Is Back". Ford covered that song on her Living Like a Runaway album and recorded live for this album. This album features recordings from Ford's October 2012 performance at the Canyon Club in Agoura Hills, California.

The album mostly focuses on the material from Ford's album, Living Like a Runaway, and her most successful album, Lita, although she did record one song from Stiletto, one from Out for Blood, and one from Dancin' on the Edge.

== Lita Ford's quotes ==
Lita's quotes about the album was "There was nothing on it but raw energy, and that's what you get with The Bitch is Back. There's a lot of emotion and aggression behind it. Plus, I've got a smoking hot band. Mitch Perry [guitar] and I can read each other like a book. We don't even have to speak. I've known him since 1983. He's like family."

== Reception ==
Professional ratings
Review scores
Source	Rating
Classic Rock	4/10 stars

Rock Revolt magazine rated the album favorably and wrote that it was "raw and real and that’s what rock and roll is all about." Geeks of Doom also recommended the album and praised its "shredding solos". Music Enthusiast Magazine wrote "Lita Ford captivates both her in-house and at-home audience through the entire performance, and kept the live recording true with no overdubs or engineering trickery. This is what made the classic live albums of the seventies and eighties so popular, and Lita Ford achieves these goals with the same strength and success." On the contrary, veteran journalist Geoff Barton in his review for Classic Rock suggests to "run away" from this album, which "sounds like it was taken straight from the mixing desk and then put in a Moulinex liquidiser until it was reduced to unappetising grey paste."

== Track listing ==
1. "The Bitch Is Back"
2. "Hungry"
3. "Relentless"
4. "Living Like a Runaway"
5. "Devil in My Head"
6. "Back to the Cave"
7. "Can't Catch Me"
8. "Out for Blood"
9. "Dancing on the Edge"
10. "Hate"
11. "Close My Eyes Forever"
12. "Kiss Me Deadly"

== Band Personnel ==
- Lita Ford - lead & rhythm guitars, lead vocals, keyboards
- Mitch Perry - guitar
- Marty O'Brien - bass
- Scot Coogan - drums

== Production ==
- Produced by Bobby Collin and Lita Ford
- Engineered and mixed by Bill Gaal
- Mastered by Fernando Cavazos
- A&R by Olly Hahn and Maria Ouellette
