= The Best of Lita Ford =

Greatest hits album by Lita Ford
- Released: July 28, 1992
- Recorded: 1984–1991
- Genre: Glam metal
- Length: 47:36
- Label: RCA Records

Lita Ford chronology
| Dangerous Curves (1991) | The Best of Lita Ford (1992) | Black (1995) |

Professional ratings
Review scores
| Source | Rating |
|---|---|
| Allmusic | 4/5 stars |
| Select | 2/5 stars |

The Best of Lita Ford is a compilation album from Lita Ford. Released on July 28, 1992, it includes the hit singles "Kiss Me Deadly" and the duet with Ozzy Osbourne, "Close My Eyes Forever", as well as several other minor hits from Ford's solo career.

== Track listing ==
1. "What Do Ya Know About Love?" (Randy Cantor, Michael Caruso, Cal Curtis) – 3:54
2. "Kiss Me Deadly" (Mick Smiley) – 3:59
3. "Shot of Poison" (Lita Ford, Myron Grombacher, Jim Vallance) – 3:32
4. "Hungry" (Michael Dan Ehmig, Ford) – 4:53
5. "Gotta Let Go" (Ford, Geoffrey Leib) – 3:55
6. "Close My Eyes Forever" (Ford, Ozzy Osbourne) – 4:42
7. "Larger Than Life" (Ehmig, Ford, Grombacher) – 3:56
8. "Only Women Bleed" (Alice Cooper, Dick Wagner) – 5:54
9. "Playin' with Fire" (Ehmig, Ford, Vallance) – 4:06
10. "Back to the Cave" (Mike Chapman, David Ezrin, Ford) – 4:01
11. "Lisa" (Ehmig, Ford) – 4:44
