= Device (metal band) =

American metal band

- Origin: Austin, Texas, U.S.
- Genres: Industrial metal; alternative metal; hard rock
- Years active: 2012–2014
- Labels: Warner Bros.
- Past members: David Draiman; Geno Lenardo
- Website: deviceband.com

Device was an American industrial metal band started by David Draiman, frontman of the heavy metal group Disturbed, and Geno Lenardo, former guitarist of Filter. They released one album, Device, in 2013.

== History ==
=== Formation and self-titled album (2012–2013) ===
After Disturbed went into hiatus in late 2011, frontman David Draiman announced a new side-project called Device in May 2012. He revealed that he would be working with Geno Lenardo, former guitarist for Filter for their Title of Record and Amalgamut albums. Draiman revealed his intention to do a project with more of an electronic sound, but in an industrial metal type way, sounding similar to Nine Inch Nails or Ministry, not dubstep.

Draiman said of the band's formation:

"I was first approached by Geno Lenardo, who was working on a number of tracks for the Underworld soundtrack for the last Underworld film that came out … and he asked me if I would be interested in being a part of one of the tracks and I asked him to send me the music that he had in mind and I was able to make a really compelling and powerful song … [I] found that working with him as a songwriting partner was very easy and fluid. He's a very strong songwriter in his own right."

The band entered the studio in the beginning of June 2012, and by June 6, had already finished vocals for demo versions of five songs, "You Think You Know", "Recover", "Hunted", "Vilify", and "War of Lies".

In January 2013, Draiman confirmed the exact release dates for their self-titled album and first single. He stated that the album would be released on April 9, 2013 and the song "Vilify" would debut on the radio on February 19. He also confirmed that the album would feature guest appearances by Geezer Butler (Black Sabbath), Glenn Hughes (Deep Purple, Black Sabbath, Black Country Communion), M. Shadows (Avenged Sevenfold), Serj Tankian (System of a Down), Tom Morello (Rage Against the Machine) and Lzzy Hale (Halestorm). Draiman confirmed the track featuring Hale would be a cover of Lita Ford and Ozzy Osbourne's hit song, "Close My Eyes Forever".

The album's first single, "Vilify", was released on February 19, along with a music video and a second "behind the scenes" video. The band also released a number of songs on the internet for streaming prior to the album's release, including "You Think You Know" on March 25, "Penance" on March 28, and "Close My Eyes Forever" on March 30.

The touring band was revealed to contain drummer Will Hunt and guitarist Virus, but did not include Lenardo. The band's first live show was confirmed to be performed the day after their album was released, at the Soul Kitchen Music Hall in Mobile, Alabama on April 10, 2013. Device appeared on the 2013 version of the Gigantour festival tour.

In a 2015 interview, Draiman stated that he has no intention of making another Device album.

== Members ==
Studio

- David Draiman – lead vocals (2012–2014)
- Geno Lenardo – guitar, bass (2012–2014; didn't tour)

Touring

- Will Hunt – drums (2013)
- Virus – guitar, backing vocals (2013)

== Discography ==
=== Studio albums ===
Title	Album details	Peak chart positions								
Title	Album details	US	AUS	AUT	BEL (FL)	BEL (WA)	CAN	GER	NZ	UK
Device	Released: April 9, 2013; Label: Warner Bros.; Formats: CD, digital download	11	26	57	171	153	11	54	4	64

=== Singles ===
Title	Year	Peak chart positions			Album
Title	Year	US Act. Rock	US Heri. Rock	US Main. Rock	Album
"Vilify"	2013	1	6	1	Device
"You Think You Know"	2013	30	—	22	Device

=== Music videos ===
Year	Title	Director	Album
2013	"Vilify"	P. R. Brown	Device
2013	"You Think You Know"	P. R. Brown	Device

== Awards ==
Revolver Golden Gods Awards

Year	Nominee / work	Award	Result
2013	Device	Best New Talent	Won

Loudwire Music Awards

Year	Nominee / work	Award	Result
2013	Device	Best New Artist	Won
2013	"You Think You Know"	Cage Match Hall of Fame	Won
