= Device (Device album) =

Studio album by Device
- Released: April 9, 2013
- Recorded: 2012–2013 at David Draiman's Home Studio, in Austin, TX
- Genres: Industrial metal; alternative metal; hard rock
- Length: 40:20
- Label: Warner Bros.
- Producers: David Draiman, Geno Lenardo

Singles from Device
- 1. "Vilify" Released: February 19, 2013; 2. "You Think You Know" Released: June 11, 2013

Device is the only studio album by American industrial metal band Device, a side project featuring David Draiman of Disturbed and former Filter guitarist Geno Lenardo. It was released on April 9, 2013, with their first single, "Vilify", out on digital download on February 19, 2013. The second single, "You Think You Know", was released on June 11, 2013.

== Background ==
After Disturbed went into hiatus in late 2011, frontman David Draiman announced a new side-project, Device, in May 2012. He revealed that he would be working with Geno Lenardo, former guitarist for Filter for their Title of Record and Amalgamut albums, in the new side project. Draiman revealed his intention to do a project with more of an electronic sound, but in an industrial metal type way, sounding similar to Nine Inch Nails or Ministry, not dubstep.

Draiman said of the band's formation:

"I was first approached by Geno Lenardo, who was working on a number of tracks for the Underworld soundtrack for the last Underworld film that came out … and he asked me if I would be interested in being a part of one of the tracks and I asked him to send me the music that he had in mind and I was able to make a really compelling and powerful song … [I] found that working with him as a songwriting partner was very easy and fluid. He's a very strong songwriter in his own right."

The band entered the studio in the beginning of June 2012, and by June 6, had already finished vocals for demo versions of five songs, "You Think You Know", "Recover", "Hunted", "Vilify" and "War of Lies".

In January 2013, Draiman confirmed the release dates for their self-titled album and first single. He stated that the album would be released on April 9, 2013, and the song "Vilify" would debut on the radio on February 19. He also confirmed that the album would feature guest appearances by Geezer Butler (Black Sabbath), Glenn Hughes (Deep Purple, Black Sabbath, Black Country Communion), M. Shadows (Avenged Sevenfold), Serj Tankian (System of a Down), Tom Morello (Rage Against the Machine) and Lzzy Hale (Halestorm). Draiman confirmed the track featuring Hale would be a cover of Lita Ford's "Close My Eyes Forever".

== Release and promotion ==
The "Vilify" video was released on February 19. It depicts the band performing in a mostly dark environment with flashes of blinding white light as an android-like creature appears to be born. A behind the scenes video for the music video was released on February 18, 2013.

On March 25, the band released a second track off the album, "You Think You Know". On March 27, the band had premiered the song "Penance" exclusively on Billboard's website. On March 29, the band's cover of Lita Ford and Ozzy Osbourne's duet "Close My Eyes Forever" was debuted exclusively by Bloody Disgusting.

The touring band was revealed to contain Evanescence drummer Will Hunt and Dope guitarist Virus, but will not include Lenardo. The band's first live show was performed a day after their album's release at the Soul Kitchen Music Hall in Mobile, AL on April 10.

== Reception ==
Professional ratings
Review scores
| Source | Rating |
|---|---|
| Artistdirect | 5/5 stars |
| AllMusic | 3/5 stars |
| Bloody Disgusting | 2/5 stars |
| Loudwire | 3/5 stars |

Reception for the album has been mixed. Bloody Disgusting described the album as "...nothing more than Disturbed-lite..." and criticized it for being "...entirely forgettable and, disappointingly, incredibly generic". Conversely, Artist Direct gave the album a very enthusiastic review, referring to the album's sound as "refreshing and reinvigorating" and calling it "...one of the year's best records".

== Track listing ==
The track listing for the album was revealed in February 2013. All songs written and composed by David Draiman and Geno Lenardo, except where noted.

| No. | Title | Writer(s) | Length |
|---|---|---|---|
| 1. | "You Think You Know" | | 3:39 |
| 2. | "Penance" | | 3:28 |
| 3. | "Vilify" | | 3:39 |
| 4. | "Close My Eyes Forever" (featuring Lzzy Hale) (Lita Ford & Ozzy Osbourne cover) | Lita Ford, Ozzy Osbourne | 4:36 |
| 5. | "Out of Line" (featuring Serj Tankian & Geezer Butler) | | 3:40 |
| 6. | "Hunted" | | 3:53 |
| 7. | "Opinion" (featuring Tom Morello) | | 3:52 |
| 8. | "War of Lies" | | 4:05 |
| 9. | "Haze" (featuring M. Shadows) | | 4:24 |
| 10. | "Through It All" (featuring Glenn Hughes) | | 5:04 |
| Total length: | | | 40:20 |

Japan edition
| No. | Title | Writer(s) | Length |
|---|---|---|---|
| 11. | "Wish" (Nine Inch Nails cover) | Trent Reznor | 3:47 |
| Total length: | | | 44:07 |

Deluxe edition
| No. | Title | Writer(s) | Length |
|---|---|---|---|
| 11. | "Wish" (Nine Inch Nails cover) | Trent Reznor | 3:47 |
| 12. | "A Part of Me" | | 3:28 |
| Total length: | | | 47:35 |

Best Buy exclusive
| No. | Title | Length |
|---|---|---|
| 13. | "Recover" | 4:14 |
| Total length: | | 51:49 |

== Personnel ==
Device

- David Draiman – vocals
- Geno Lenardo – guitars, bass, drums, keyboards

Additional personnel

- Lzzy Hale – vocals on "Close My Eyes Forever"
- M. Shadows – vocals on "Haze"
- Glenn Hughes – vocals on "Through It All"
- Serj Tankian – vocals on "Out of Line"
- Tom Morello – guitars on "Opinion"
- Geezer Butler – bass on "Out of Line"

Production

- David Draiman and Geno Lenardo – production
- Jeremy Parker – engineering
- Ben Grosse – mixing
- Paul Pavro – mix assisting and additional editing
- Ted Jensen – mastering
- P.R. Brown – photography and design

== Chart performance ==
Weekly charts

| Chart (2013) | Peak position |
|---|---|
| Australian Albums (ARIA) | 26 |
| Austrian Albums (Ö3 Austria) | 57 |
| Belgium Flanders Albums (Ultratop) | 171 |
| Belgium Wallonia Albums (Ultratop) | 153 |
| Canadian Albums (Billboard) | 11 |
| German Albums (Offizielle Top 100) | 54 |
| New Zealand Albums (RMNZ) | 4 |
| Scottish Albums (Official Charts) | 67 |
| UK Albums (Official Charts) | 64 |
| UK Album Downloads (Official Charts) | 49 |
| UK Rock & Metal Albums (Official Charts) | 6 |
| US Billboard 200 | 11 |
