= Recording studio as an instrument =

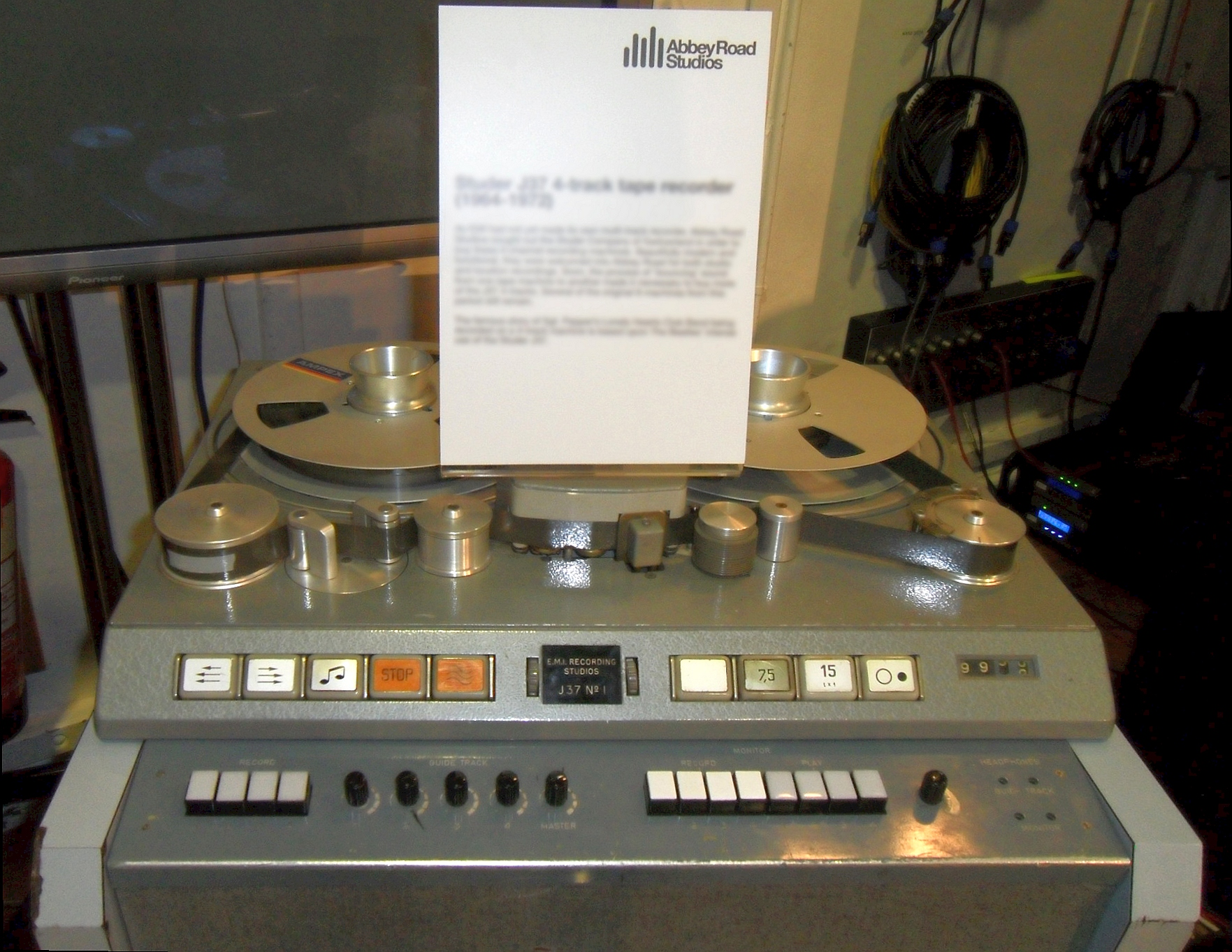
A Studer four-track tape recorder used at EMI Studios from 1965 to the 1970s

In music production, the recording studio is often treated as a musical instrument when it plays a significant role in the composition of music. Sometimes called "playing the studio", the approach is typically embodied by artists or producers who favor the creative use of studio technology in record production, as opposed to simply documenting live performances in the studio. Techniques include the incorporation of non-musical sounds, overdubbing, tape edits, sound synthesis, audio signal processing, and combining segmented performances (takes) into a unified whole.

Composers have exploited the potential of multitrack recording from the time the technology was first introduced. Before the late 1940s, musical recordings were typically created with the idea of presenting a faithful rendition of a real-life performance. Following the advent of three-track tape recorders in the mid-1950s, recording spaces became more accustomed to in-studio composition. By the late 1960s, in-studio composition had become standard practice and has remained as such into the 21st century.

Despite the widespread changes that have led to more compact recording set-ups, individual components such as digital audio workstations (DAWs) are still colloquially referred to as "the studio".

== Definitions ==
There is no single instance in which the studio suddenly became recognized as an instrument, and even at present [2018] it may not have wide recognition as such. Nevertheless, there is a historical precedent of the studio—broadly defined—consciously being used to perform music.

— Adam Bell, Dawn of the DAW: The Studio as Musical Instrument

"Playing the studio" is equivalent to 'in-studio composition', meaning writing and production occur concurrently. Definitions of the specific criterion of a "musical instrument" vary, and it is unclear whether the "studio as instrument" concept extends to using multi-track recording simply to facilitate the basic music writing process. According to academic Adam Bell, some proposed definitions may be consistent with music produced in a recording studio, but not with music that relies heavily on digital audio workstations (DAW). Various music educators alluded to "using the studio as a musical instrument" in books published as early as the late 1960s.

Rock historian Doyle Greene defines "studio as compositional tool" as a process in which music is produced around studio constructions rather than the more traditional method of capturing a live performance as is. Techniques include the incorporation of non-musical sounds, overdubbing, tape edits, sound synthesis, audio signal processing, and combining segmented performances (takes) into a unified whole. Despite the widespread changes that have led to more compact recording set-ups, individual components such as DAWs are still referred to as "the studio".

== Evolution of recording processes ==
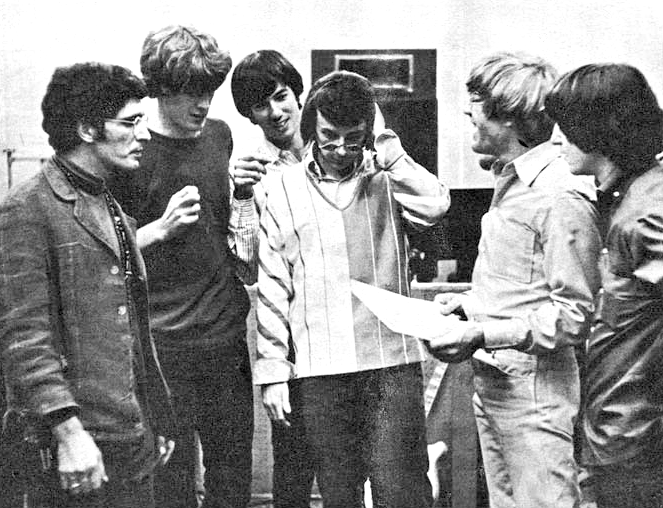
Phil Spector (center) at Gold Star Studios, where he developed his Wall of Sound methods, 1965

Composers have exploited the potential of recording technology since it was first made available to them. Before the late 1940s, musical recordings were typically created with the idea of presenting a faithful rendition of a real-life performance. Writing in 1937, the American composer John Cage called for the development of "centers of experimental music," places where "the new materials, oscillators, turntables, generators, means for amplifying small sounds, film phonographs, etc." would allow composers to "work using twentieth-century means for making music."

In the early 1950s, electronic equipment was expensive to own, and for most people, was only accessible through large organizations or institutions. However, virtually every young composer was interested in the potential of tape-based recording. According to Brian Eno, "the move to tape was very important", because unlike gramophone records, tape was "malleable and mutable and cuttable and reversible in ways that discs aren't. It's very hard to do anything interesting with a disc". In the mid-1950s, popular recording conventions changed profoundly with the advent of three-track tape recorders, and by the early 1960s, it was common for producers, songwriters, and engineers to freely experiment with musical form, orchestration, unnatural reverb, and other sound effects. Some of the best-known examples are Phil Spector's Wall of Sound and Joe Meek's use of homemade electronic sound effects for acts like the Tornados.

In-studio composition became standard practice by the late 1960s and early 1970s, and remained so into the 2010s. During the 1970s, the "studio as instrument" concept shifted from the studio's recording space to the studio's control room, where electronic instruments could be plugged directly into the mixing console. As of the 2010s, the "studio as instrument" idea remains ubiquitous in genres such as pop, hip-hop, and electronic music.

== Notable artists and works ==
=== 1940s–1950s ===
Pioneers from the 1940s include Bill Putnam, Les Paul, and Tom Dowd, who each contributed to the development of common recording practices like reverb, tape delay, and overdubbing. Putnam was one of the first to recognize echo and reverb as elements to enhance a recording, rather than as natural byproducts of the recording space. He engineered the Harmonicats' 1947 novelty song "Peg o' My Heart", which was a significant chart hit and became the first popular recording to use artificial reverb for artistic effect. Although Les Paul was not the first to use overdubs, he popularized the technique in the 1950s.

Around the same time, French composers Pierre Schaeffer and Pierre Henry were developing musique concrete, a method of composition in which pieces of tape are rearranged and spliced together, and thus originated sampling. Meanwhile, in England, Daphne Oram experimented heavily with electronic instruments during her tenure as a balancing engineer for the BBC; however, her tape experiments were mostly unheard at the time.

=== 1950s–1960s ===
==== Meek, Leiber, Stoller, and Spector ====
The Tornadoes – "Telstar" (1962)
Meek's best-known production, "Telstar", features a sped-up piano, a clavioline overdubbed three times, and a guitar that fades in and out of the recording. The piece won an Ivor Novello Award and sold over five million copies worldwide.

The BBC Radiophonic Workshop was one of the first to use the recording studio as a creative tool, often overlooked as was producing music for TV (and the prominent people were women): Daphne Oram and Delia Derbyshire were early innovators.

English producer Joe Meek around the same time exploited the use of recording studios as instruments, and one of the first producers to assert an individual identity as an artist. He began production work in 1955 at IBC Studios in London. One of Meek's signature techniques was to overload a signal with dynamic range compression, which was unorthodox at the time. He was antagonized by his employers for his "radical" techniques. Some of these methods, such as close-miking instruments, later became part of normal recording practice. Music journalist Mark Beaumont writes that Meek "realised the studio-as-instrument philosophy years before The Beatles or The Beach Boys".

Discussing Jerry Leiber and Mike Stoller, Adam Bell describes the songwriting duo's productions for the Coasters as "an excellent example of their pioneering practices in the emerging field of production", citing an account from Stoller in which he recalls "cutting esses off words, sticking the tape back together so you didn't notice. And sometimes if the first refrain on a take was good and the second one lousy, we'd tape another recording of the first one and stick it in place of the second one."

Phil Spector, sometimes regarded as Joe Meek's American counterpart, is also considered "important as the first star producer of popular music and its first 'auteur' ... Spector changed pop music from a performing art ... to an art which could sometimes exist only in the recording studio". His original production formula (dubbed the "Wall of Sound") called for large ensembles (including some instruments not generally used for ensemble playing, such as electric and acoustic guitars), with multiple instruments doubling and even tripling many of the parts to create a fuller, richer sound. (Note: For example, Spector would often duplicate a part played by an acoustic piano with an electric piano and a harpsichord. Session guitarist Barney Kessel notes: "Musically, it was terribly simple, but the way he recorded and miked it, they’d diffuse it so that you couldn't pick out any one instrument. Techniques like distortion and echo were not new, but Phil came along and took these to make sounds that had not been used in the past. I thought it was ingenious.") It evolved from his mid-1950s work with Leiber and Stoller during the period in which they sought a fuller sound through excessive instrumentation. (Note: Leiber and Stoller considered Spector's methods to be very distinct from what they were doing, stating: "Phil was the first one to use multiple drum kits, three pianos and so on. We went for much more clarity in terms of instrumental colors, and he deliberately blended everything into a kind of mulch. He definitely had a different point of view.") Spector's 1963 production of "Be My Baby", according to Rolling Stone magazine, was a "Rosetta stone for studio pioneers such as the Beatles and Brian Wilson".

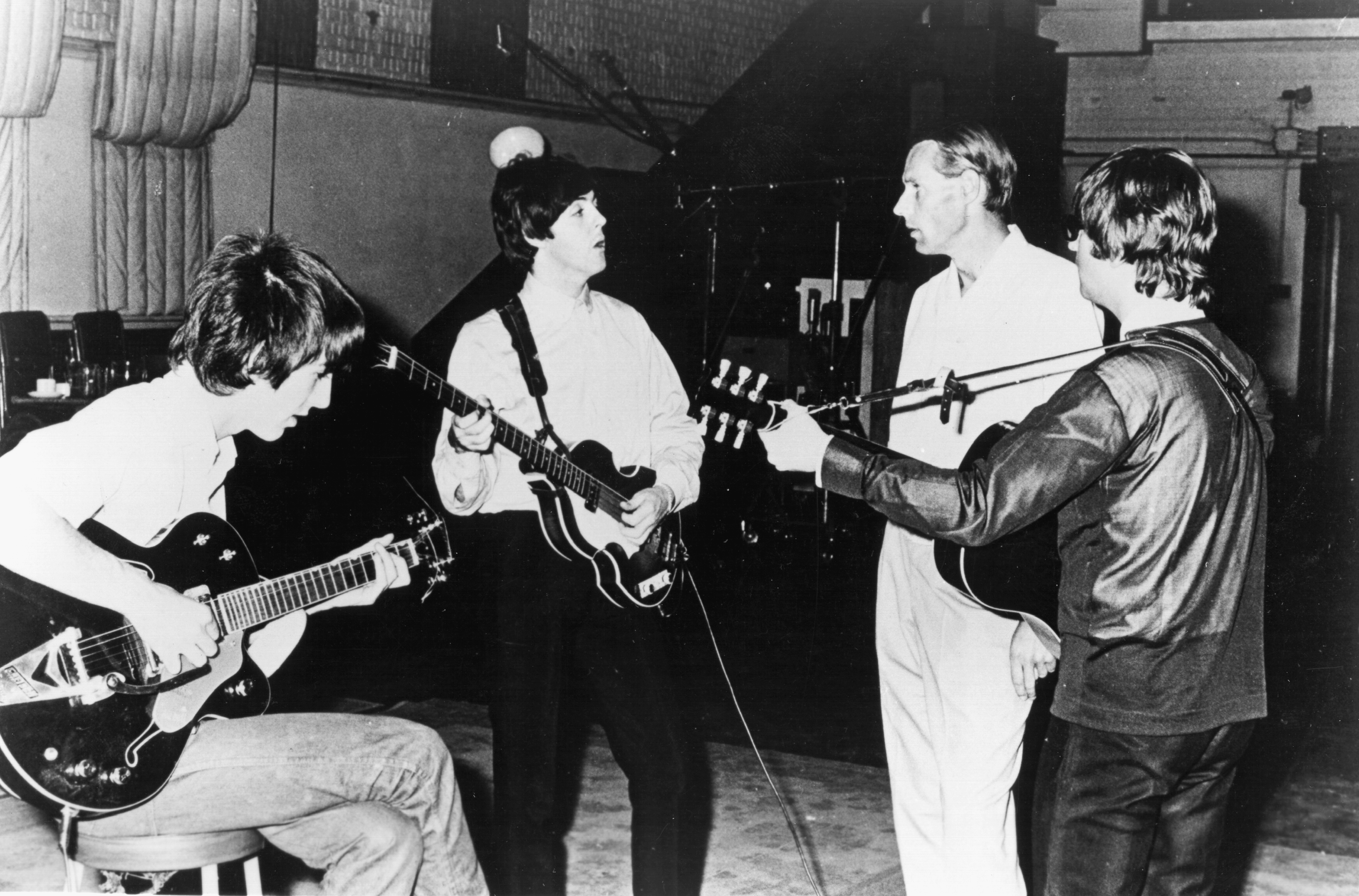
Martin working with the Beatles, 1964

==== Beatles and Beach Boys ====
The Beach Boys' producer-songwriter-singer Brian Wilson and the Beatles' producer George Martin are generally credited with helping to popularize the idea of the studio as an instrument used for in-studio composition, and music producers after the mid-1960s increasingly drew from their work. (Note: Academic Bill Martin writes that the advancing technology of multitrack recording and mixing boards were more influential to experimental rock than electronic instruments such as the synthesizer, allowing the Beatles and the Beach Boys to become the first crop of non-classically trained musicians to create extended and complex compositions.) Although Martin was nominally the Beatles' producer, from 1964 he ceded control to the band, allowing them to use the studio as a workshop for their ideas and later as a sound laboratory. Musicologist Olivier Julien writes that the Beatles' "gradual integration of arranging and recording into one and the same process" began as early as 1963, but developed in earnest during the sessions for Rubber Soul (1965) and Revolver (1966) and "ultimately blossomed" during the sessions for Sgt. Pepper's Lonely Hearts Club Band (1967). Wilson, who was influenced by Spector, was another early auteur of popular music. Authors Jim Cogan and William Clark credit him as the first rock producer to use the studio as a discrete instrument.

The Beatles – "Tomorrow Never Knows" (1966)
Author Mark Brend writes that, with Revolver, the Beatles advanced on Meek's approach, and employed the studio as "an environment for wide-ranging sonic research" that included experimentation with tape loops, reversed and speed-manipulated tape sounds, and backwards-recorded lead guitar parts.

According to author David Howard, Martin's work on the Beatles' "Tomorrow Never Knows", from Revolver, and Spector's production of "River Deep – Mountain High" from the same year were the two recordings that ensured that the studio "was now its own instrument". Citing composer and producer Virgil Moorefield's book The Producer as Composer, author Jay Hodgson highlights Revolver as representing a "dramatic turning point" in recording history through its dedication to studio exploration over the "performability" of the songs, as this and subsequent Beatles albums reshaped listeners' preconceptions of a pop recording. According to Julien, the follow-up LP Sgt. Pepper represents the "epitome of the transformation of the recording studio into a compositional tool", marking the moment when "popular music entered the era of phonographic composition." Composer and musicologist Michael Hannan attributes the album's impact to Martin and his engineers, in response to the Beatles' demands, making increasingly creative use of studio equipment and originating new processes.

Like Revolver, "Good Vibrations", which Wilson produced for the Beach Boys in 1966, was a prime example of revolutionizing rock from live concert performances into studio productions that could only exist on record. For the first time, Wilson limited himself to recording short interchangeable fragments (or "modules") rather than a complete song. Through the method of tape splicing, each fragment could then be assembled into a linear sequence – as Wilson explored on subsequent recordings from this period – allowing any number of larger structures and divergent moods to be produced at a later time. (Note: Academic Marshall Heiser saw the resultant style of jumpcuts as a "striking characteristic", and that they "must be acknowledged as compositional statements in themselves, giving the music a sonic signature every bit as noticeable as the performances themselves. There was no way this music could be 'real.' Wilson was therefore echoing the techniques of musique concrète and seemed to be breaking the audio 'fourth wall'—if there can said to be such a thing.") Musicologist Charlie Gillett called "Good Vibrations" "one of the first records to flaunt studio production as a quality in its own right, rather than as a means of presenting a performance", while rock critic Gene Sculatti called it the "ultimate in-studio production trip", adding that its influence was apparent in songs such as "A Day in the Life" from Sgt. Pepper.

=== 1970s–2010s ===
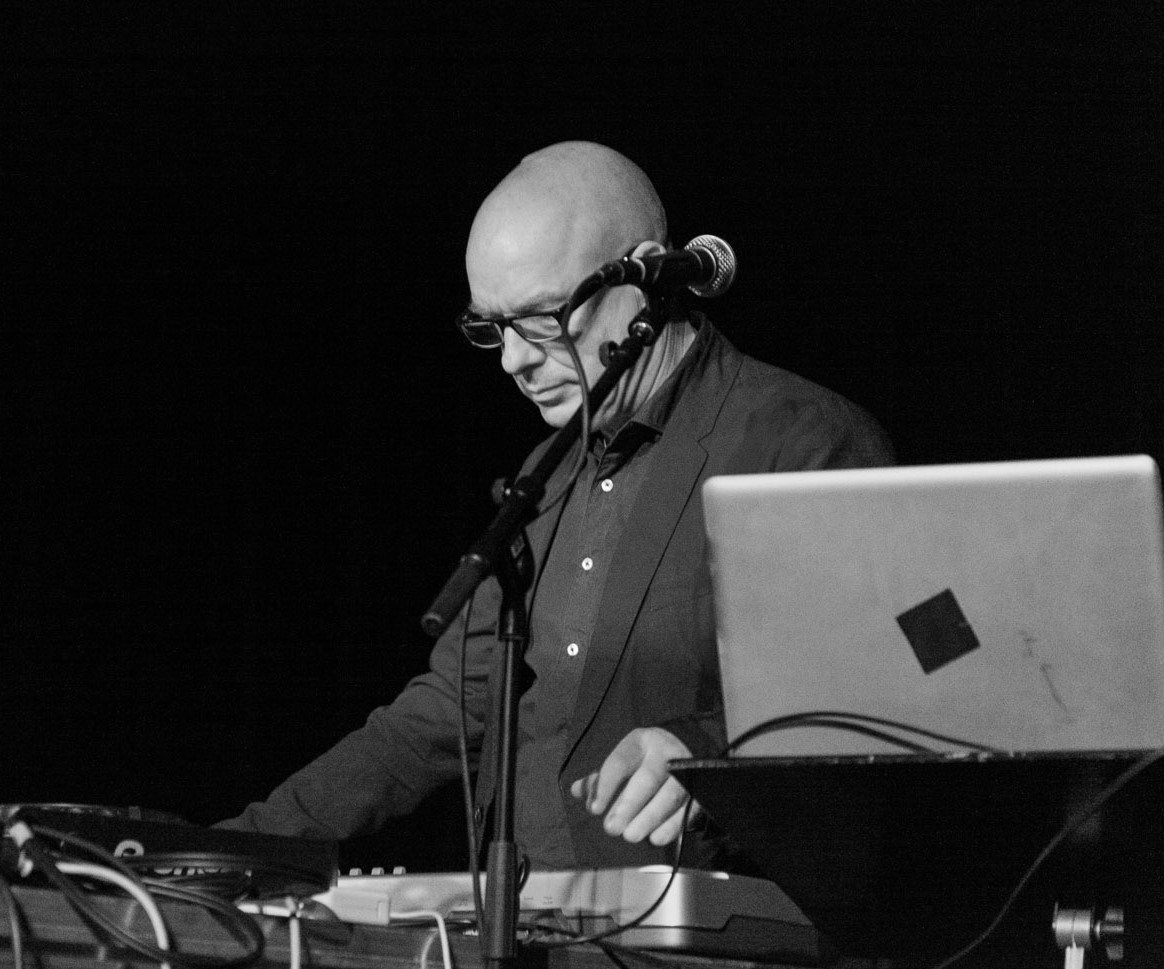
Brian Eno at a live remix in 2012

Adam Bell credits Brian Eno with popularizing the concept of the studio as instrument, particularly that it "did not require previous experience, and in some ways, a lack of know-how might even be advantageous to creativity", and that "such an approach was typified" by Kraftwerk, whose members proclaimed "we play the studio". He goes on to say:

While those of the ilk of Brian Wilson used the studio as an instrument by orchestrating everyone that worked within it, the turn to technology in the cases of Sly Stone, Stevie Wonder, Prince, and Brian Eno signify a conceptual shift in which an alternative approach that might make using the studio as an instrument cheaper, easier, more convenient, or more creative, was increasingly sought after. Compared to the 1960s, using the studio as an instrument became less about working the system as it were, and working the systems.

Producer Conny Plank was cited as creating "a world in sound using the studio as an instrument," producing bands such as Can, Cluster, Neu!, Kraftwerk and Ultravox amongst many others, the studio was seen as an integral part of the music.

Jamaican producer Lee "Scratch" Perry was noted for his 1970s reggae and dub productions, recorded at his Black Ark studio. David Toop commented that "at its heights, Perry's genius has transformed the recording studio" into "virtual space, an imaginary chamber over which presided the electronic wizard, evangelist, gossip columnist and Dr. Frankenstein that he became."

From the late 1970s onward, hip hop production has been strongly linked to the lineage and technique of earlier artists who used the studio as an instrument. Jazz critic Francis Davis identified early hip-hop DJs, including Afrika Bambaataa and Grandmaster Flash, as "grassroots successors to Phil Spector, Brian Wilson, and George Martin, the 1960s producers who pioneered the use of the recording studio as an instrument in its own right."

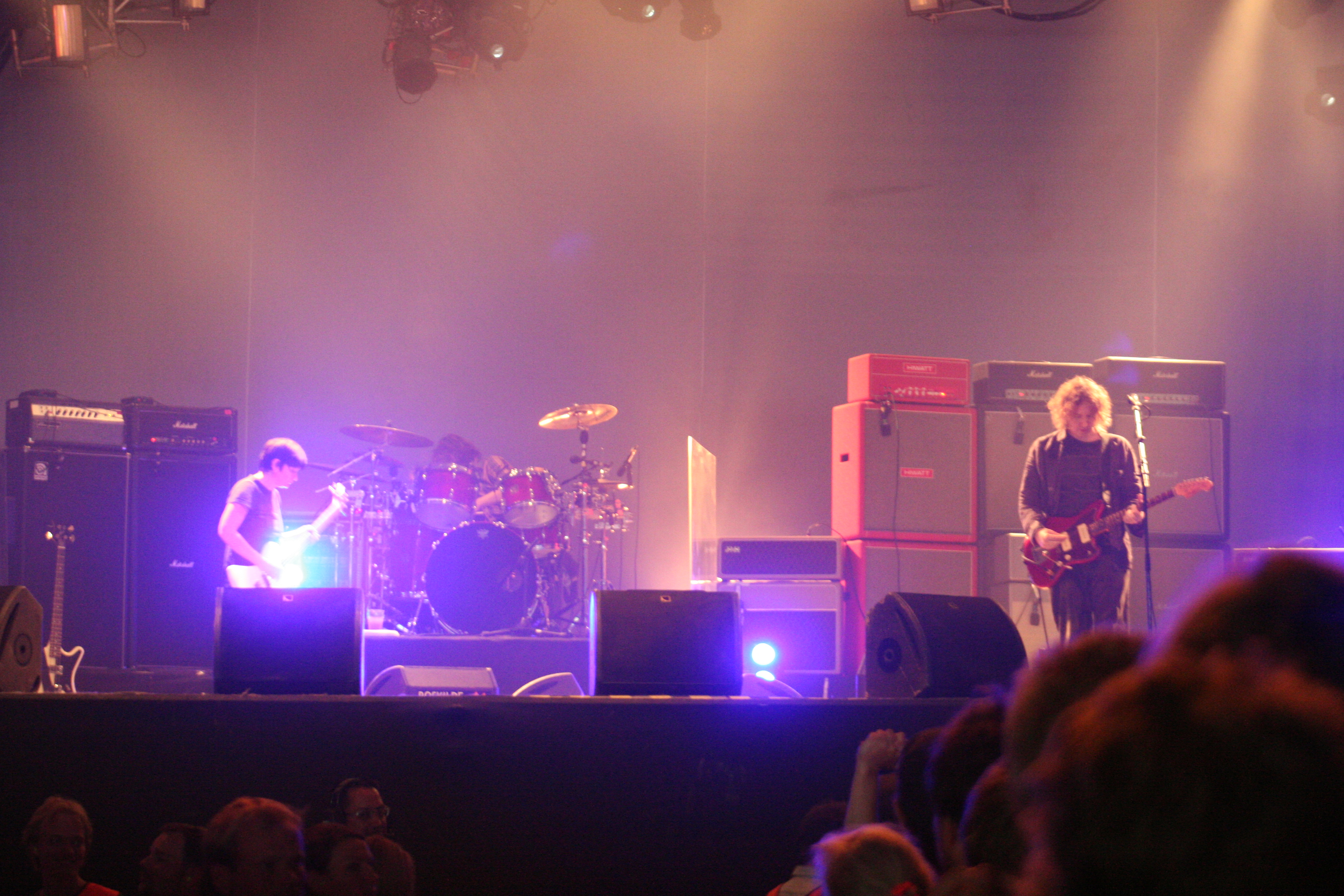
My Bloody Valentine performing in 2008

Beginning in the 1980s, musicians associated with the genres dream pop and shoegazing made innovative use of effects pedals and recording techniques to create ethereal, "dreamy" musical atmospheres. The English-Irish shoegazing band My Bloody Valentine, helmed by guitarist-producer Kevin Shields, are often celebrated for their studio albums Isn't Anything (1988) and Loveless (1991). Writing for The Sunday Times, Paul Lester said Shields is "widely accepted as shoegazing's genius", with "his astonishing wall of sound, use of the studio as instrument and dazzling reinvention of the guitar making him a sort of hydra-headed Spector-Hendrix-Eno figure".

Chuck Eddy writes that, as the CD era emerged in the late 1980s, pop-metal was the first musical style to exploit contemporary recording studio techniques for "an aesthetic advantage", citing Def Leppard's Hysteria (1987) as a pioneering example and Lita Ford's Stiletto (1990) as a similar case, as both albums feature incidental high tech "whooshes and wobbles and giggles and boinks". Similarly, Eddy cites Kix's Blow My Fuse (1988) as an album whose sonics embody a futuristic "digital disco" sound, with "dub-doctored Who synths" and a 'studiofied' production.

American psychedelic rock band the Flaming Lips earned comparisons by critics to Brian Wilson's work when discussing their albums Zaireeka (1997) and The Soft Bulletin (1999), which were the results of extensive studio experimentation. When asked what instrument he played, frontman Wayne Coyne simply stated "the recording studio".

== See also ==
- Acousmatic music
- Art pop
- Click track
- Columbia-Princeton Electronic Music Center
- Electroacoustic music
- Experimental pop
- Groupe de Recherches Musicales
- Lo-fi/DIY music
- Plunderphonics
- Post-punk
- Post-rock
- Psychedelic music
- Recording consciousness
- Recording practices of the Beatles
- Soundbreaking documentary series
- Xenochrony
- Studio di fonologia musicale di Radio Milano
- Studio for Electronic Music (WDR)

== Bibliography ==
- Ashby, Arved Mark, ed. (2004). The Pleasure of Modernist Music: Listening, Meaning, Intention, Ideology. Boydell & Brewer. ISBN 978-1-58046-143-6.
- Bannister, Matthew (2007). White Boys, White Noise: Masculinities and 1980s Indie Guitar Rock. Ashgate Publishing, Ltd. ISBN 978-0-7546-8803-7.
- Bell, Adam Patrick (2018). Dawn of the DAW: The Studio as Musical Instrument. Oxford University Press. ISBN 978-0-19-029660-5.
- Blake, Andrew (2009). "Recording practices and the role of the producer". In Cook, Nicholas; Clarke, Eric; Leech-Wilkinson, Daniel (eds.). The Cambridge Companion to Recorded Music. Cambridge University Press. ISBN 978-1-139-82796-6.
- Brend, Mark (2005). Strange Sounds: Offbeat Instruments and Sonic Experiments in Pop. San Francisco, CA: Backbeat Books. ISBN 978-0-879308551.
- Cogan, Jim; Clark, William (2003). Temples of Sound: Inside the Great Recording Studios. Chronicle Books. ISBN 978-0-8118-3394-3.
- Davis, Francis (2004). Jazz and Its Discontents: A Francis Davis Reader. Da Capo. ISBN 0-306-81055-7.
- Edmondson, Jacqueline, ed. (2013). Music in American Life: An Encyclopedia of the Songs, Styles, Stars, and Stories that Shaped our Culture. ABC-CLIO. ISBN 978-0-313-39348-8.
- Eno, Brian (2004). "The Studio as Compositional Tool" (PDF). In Cox, Christoph; Warner, Daniel (eds.). Audio Culture: Readings in Modern Music. A&C Black. ISBN 978-0-8264-1615-5.
- Gillett, Charlie (1984). The Sound of the City: The Rise of Rock and Roll. Perseus Books Group. ISBN 978-0-306-80683-4.
- Greene, Doyle (2016). Rock, Counterculture and the Avant-Garde, 1966–1970: How the Beatles, Frank Zappa and the Velvet Underground Defined an Era. McFarland. ISBN 978-1-4766-2403-7.
- Hannan, Michael (2008). "The sound design of Sgt. Pepper's Lonely Hearts Club Band". In Julien, Olivier (ed.). Sgt. Pepper and the Beatles: It Was Forty Years Ago Today. Ashgate. ISBN 978-0-7546-6708-7.
- Hodgson, Jay (2010). Understanding Records: A Field Guide to Recording Practice. New York, NY: Continuum. ISBN 978-1-4411-5607-5.
- Howard, David N. (2004). Sonic Alchemy: Visionary Music Producers and Their Maverick Recordings. Milwaukee, WI: Hal Leonard. ISBN 0-634-05560-7.
- Julien, Oliver (2008). "'A lucky man who made the grade': Sgt. Pepper and the rise of a phonographic tradition in twentieth-century popular music". In Julien, Olivier (ed.). Sgt. Pepper and the Beatles: It Was Forty Years Ago Today. Ashgate. ISBN 978-0-7546-6708-7.
- Martin, Bill (2015). Avant Rock: Experimental Music from the Beatles to Bjork. Open Court Publishing Company. ISBN 978-0-8126-9939-5.
- Millard, André (2012). Beatlemania: Technology, Business, and Teen Culture in Cold War America. Baltimore, MD: Johns Hopkins University Press. ISBN 978-1-4214-0525-4.
- Moorefield, Virgil (2010). The Producer as Composer: Shaping the Sounds of Popular Music. MIT Press. ISBN 978-0-262-13457-6.
- Ribowsky, Mark (1989). He's a Rebel. Dutton. ISBN 978-0-525-24727-2.
- Toop, David (2018) [First published 1995]. Ocean of Sound: Ambient Sound and Radical Listening in the Age of Communication. Serpent's Tail. ISBN 978-1-78816-030-8.
- Zak, Albin (2001). Poetics of Rock: Cutting Tracks, Making Records. University of California Press. ISBN 978-0-520-92815-2.
