= Time capsule (disambiguation) =

A time capsule is a historic cache of goods or information, usually intended as a method of communication with future people.

Time Capsule may also refer to:

== Television ==
- "Time Capsule" (Happy Days), a 1977 episode
- "Time Capsule" (Parks and Recreation), a 2011 episode

== Music ==
- Time Capsule: Songs for a Future Generation, a 1998 greatest hits album by the B-52's
- Time Capsule (Elvin Jones album), 1977
- Time Capsule (Fingathing album), a 2005 compilation of Fingathing's first three albums
- Time Capsule (Marxman album), a 1996 album by Marxman
- Time Capsule (Lita Ford album), a 2016 album by Lita Ford
- "Time Capsule", a song by Air
- "Time Capsule", a song by Matthew Sweet
- "Time Capsule", a song by The Network
- "Time Capsule", a song by Tokyo Jihen

== Other ==
- AirPort Time Capsule, a wireless network-attached storage device combined with a wireless residential gateway router
- Time capsules, fixed patterns that create the appearance of motion or change according to Julian Barbour's timeless physics
- The Time Capsule, themed swimming and leisure complex in Coatbridge, Scotland
