= Black (Lita Ford album) =

Studio album by Lita Ford
- Released: February 14, 1995
- Recorded: 1994
- Studios: Cherokee Studios, Hollywood, California
- Genre: Heavy metal
- Length: 59:02
- Label: ZYX
- Producer: The Robb Brothers

Lita Ford chronology
The Best of Lita Ford (1992)	Black (1995)	Greatest Hits Live! (2000)

Singles from Black
- 1. "Killin' Kind" / "Smokin' Toads" Released: 1995

Professional ratings
Review scores
Source	Rating
Allmusic	2/5 stars

Black is Lita Ford's sixth solo studio album and featured a change of style in her music, compared to her other albums. Black sees Ford move into other musical styles such as blues and grunge, while still maintaining her metal and rock roots. There would be a 14-year gap between Black and her next studio album, 2009's Wicked Wonderland.

== Track listing ==
All songs were written by Michael Dan Ehmig and Lita Ford, except where noted.

1. "Black" – 5:07
2. "Fall" (Rodger Carter, Larry 'Bones' Dennison, Ford, Debby Holiday) – 5:18
3. "Loverman" – 5:55
4. "Killin' Kind" (Ehmig, Ford, Taylor Rhodes) – 4:29
5. "Hammerhead" – 4:37
6. "Boilin' Point" – 3:51
7. "Where Will I Find My Heart Tonight" – 4:17
8. "War of the Angels" – 4:46
9. "Joe" (Carter, Dennison, Ford, Holiday) – 5:40
10. "White Lightnin'" – 3:58
11. "Smokin' Toads" (Instrumental) (Ford) – 4:13
12. "Spider Monkeys" – 6:51

== Personnel ==
=== Musicians ===
- Lita Ford - lead vocals, all guitars
- Larry 'Bones' Dennison - bass
- Rodger Carter - drums and percussion

Additional personnel

- Steve Reid - additional percussion
- Bruce Robb - Hammond B3
- Jimmy Z - harmonica
- Martin Tillman - cello on "War of the Angels"
- Jim Gillette, Michael Dan Ehmig, Dave King, Pork Chop, Jeff Scott Soto, Billy DiCicco - backing vocals

=== Production ===
- The Robb Brothers - producers, engineers, mixing
- Matt Ellard, Doug Trantow, Joe Breuer, Mike Gibson - assistant engineers
- Steve Hall - mastering
- Guitar and Studio Technician- Toni Francavilla
