= Michael Caruso (musician) =

American singer-songwriter

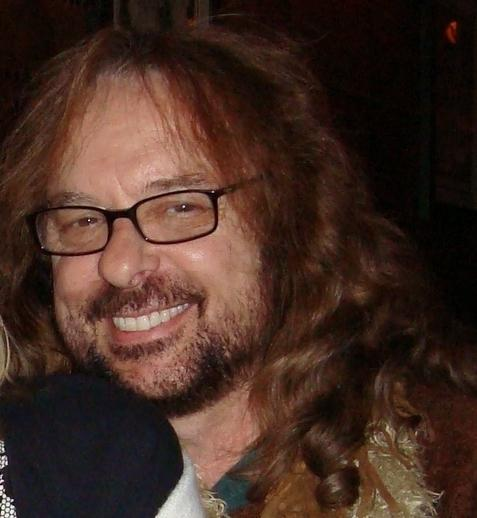

Background information
- Born: Michael Anthony Caruso; May 23, 1954 (age 72); Philadelphia, Pennsylvania, U.S.
- Genres: Rock; alternative
- Occupations: Musician; songwriter; performer
- Years active: 1974–present
- Website: michaelcarusomusic.com

Michael Caruso is an American singer-songwriter, born in Philadelphia, Pennsylvania on May 23, 1954. He studied both music and theatre at the American Academy of Dramatic Arts in Manhattan then later moved to the West Coast where he was employed as a songwriter for Homegrown Music, Geffen Music Group, Sony Music Publishing and Chrysalis Music. He performed as a solo artist and as frontman for the band "Michael's Disciples".

== Biography ==
Caruso's most well-known work "Love Is" was co-written with Tonio K, John Keller; recorded by Vanessa L. Williams with Brian McKnight, and was featured on the Beverly Hills 90210 Soundtrack. It was nominated for a Grammy in the best of R & B vocal category and earned Michael a citation of achievement from BMI for garnering two million broadcast performances. It also rose to Number 1 on the Pop Music Chart and Adult Contemporary Chart in 1993. However, Caruso's career included collaborations with many other artists and writers: co-writes with Tamara Champlin and Dennis Matkosky for Chris LeDoux's "Runaway Love" (that appeared on Billboard's Country Music's Top 40) and Rita Coolidge's Shoo Rah. Caruso's most recorded song was "Guns of Love" (written with Randy Sharp and John Keller) performed by Maura O'Connell, The Moffatts (who performed this on Good Morning America on July 3, 1995, donating proceeds from their release to the families of victims of the Oklahoma City bombing), Pam Rose for her album Morpheus, was featured on Grammy Award Winner Kathy Mattea's album Roses, by Caruso on his 2011 EP When The Devil Starts To Pray and by Randy Sharp on his 2017 release Impossible Things.

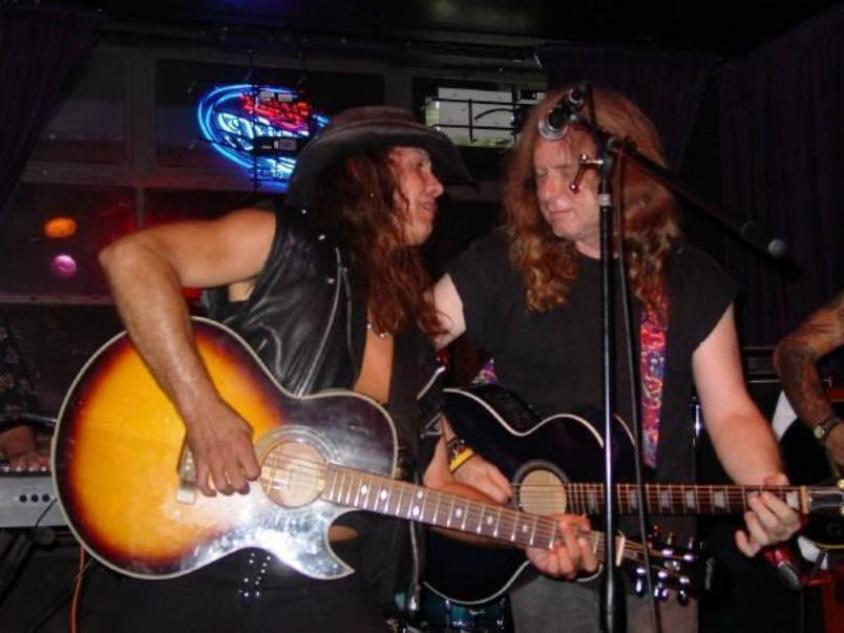
Caruso with Michaels Disciples

On "You Won't Get To Heaven Alive" by Tamara Champlin, Caruso was a background vocalist, player on several tracks, co-producer on two, and co-writes included the title track, "Purple Black and Blonde", "St Anne's Wheel" & "Tragic Black" that featured Nicky Hopkins on piano. On Will Champlin's (Finalist for 2013 The Voice) solo projects, Caruso was a co-writer on many songs from The Goldmine Sessions, his self-titled Will Champlin CD, and his EP Killing Me With Twilight. He collaborated on Bill Champlin's (formerly of Chicago) solo album No Place Left To Fall; again penning the title track with Bill and Tamara Champlin and "Tuggin' on Your Sleeve" written with Bill Champlin and Will Champlin. Caruso also co-wrote with Joan Jett and Randy Cantor a cut featuring Joan Jett & the Blackhearts for the Days of Thunder (soundtrack) entitled "Long Live The Night". Later, again as a songwriter, Caruso re-teamed with Tamara Champlin & Dennis Matkosky on a collaboration for Bekka Bramlett "What's on My Mind" that charted on Music Row.

In Episode 7 of the 2011 Season of Single Ladies on VH1, Lori Michaels performed the Michael Caruso & Tamara Champlin's ballad, "Pretty When She Cries", that had previously been featured on her CD Living My Life Out Loud released in 2008. Caruso, in 2009, was named to Music Connection Magazine's Top 100 unsigned artists list.

Michael Caruso's EP When The Devil Starts To Pray involved co-writers and musicians Randy Sharp; Trey Bruce, Roy Braverman, Tamara Champlin, Jeff Paris, Glenn Goss, TJ McFarland, Dennis Matkosky; Michael St. Thomas, and Moon Calhoun. From that release a song "For Tessa" dedicated to Caruso's daughter, inspired work with suicide prevention. Also a film short, Sunshine Deprivation Blues featured one of the EP's songs "Tell Me What You Will" (sharing vocals with Glenn Goss). Caruso released singles "True Love's Tears" (Caruso/Sharp) in 2014, "Good When You're Gone" (Caruso/Paris/Kravitz) in 2015 "What A Day" (Caruso/Rydell) in 2016, and "Another Mile" (Caruso/Sharp) in 2017. "Good When Your Gone" was also the theme song for the Rob Saul Show.

Caruso and Glenn Goss were part of a Charity Tribute to the Beatles in 2017 @ Beit T'Shubah in Los Angeles, Ca. that was hosted by Ruth McCartney, Angie McCartney and directed by Martin Nethercutt.

Caruso's video of his cover of Sunny Afternoon was screened at the Arpa International Film Festival on August 2, 2019 and had a second screening in 2020 at that festival as a co-writer with Eric Bazilian and Glenn Goss of "Only Love" by Manu Hvala. In 2021, Caruso's video "Born With An Accordion", a Caruso/Goss collaboration, was again part of the Arpa International Film Festival and was named audience favorite

In addition to collaborations with artists such as Lita Ford, Terri Nunn, Vixen, and Michael LeCompt, Caruso has also worked with the legendary Sammy Cahn, Eric Bazilian, Paul Williams, Dave Berg and Tom Keane.

== Discography ==
- "(Only Fools) At War With Love" was Caruso's first writer's cut on RCA Records by Darcus Speed on her self-titled album Darcus (Released 1977)
- "I'm Better" from Jeff Paris's Race to Paradise for Universal Music written by Michael Caruso/Jeff Paris (Released 1986; Re-Released 2012)
- "I'll Be There (Holdin On)" from Jack Wagner's Lighting Up the Night was released on Qwest Records (produced by Glenn Ballard); (It was performed by Wagner on the soap opera General Hospital) written by Jeff Paris/Michael Caruso (Released: 1986); "Holdin' On" was also included on The Dells album One Step Closer released in United States by Private Records and in Japan by Sony Records (1984). The album was re-released in Europe by Columbia (1994).
- "Love Made Me" was recorded by Vixen on their self-titled album for EMI/Manhattan Records; written by Michael Caruso, John Keller, Marcella Detroit (Released: 1988)
- "Long Live the Night" was recorded by Joan Jett and the Blackhearts for the Days of Thunder soundtrack and was released in the US by Geffen Records and Internationally by Epic Records; written by Michael Caruso, Joan Jett, Randy Cantor (Released: 1990)
- "Guns of Love" by Maura O'Connell from her album A Real Life Story, for Warner Bros. Records; written by Michael Caruso, Randy Sharp and John Keller (Released: 1991)
- "What Do You Know About Love" on Lita Ford's Dangerous Curves (where Caruso also performed background vocals) was released on RCA Records; written by Michael Caruso, Randy Cantor and Cal Curtis (Released: 1991)
- "Desire Me" and "Diane" were both on Terri Nunn's Moment of Truth album on DGC, Mercury, both cuts written by Terri Nunn, Michael Caruso, John Keller (Released: 1991)
- "None of It Matters" by Black Eyed Susan was on their release Electric Rattlebone for Mercury Records, written by Michael Caruso, Randy Cantor and Cal Curtis (Released: 1991)
- "Love Is" recorded by Vanessa Williams and Brian McKnight for Giant Records and featured on the Beverly Hills 90210 soundtrack written by Michael Caruso, John Keller and Tonio K (Released: 1992)
- "Get Off My Lawn" was recorded by John Melendez from his LP Stuttering John for One Way Records; written by Caruso/Cantor/Melendez (Released: 1994)
- "Guns of Love" by the Moffatts on their album The Moffatts for Polydor Records, Nashville; written by Caruso/Sharp/Keller (Released: 1995)
- "Tied to the Bells" (Caruso/Cantor/Tuff ) and "Don't Complain" (Caruso/Tuff) were included on Tuff's CD, Decade of Disrespect, for RLS Records (Released 1996)

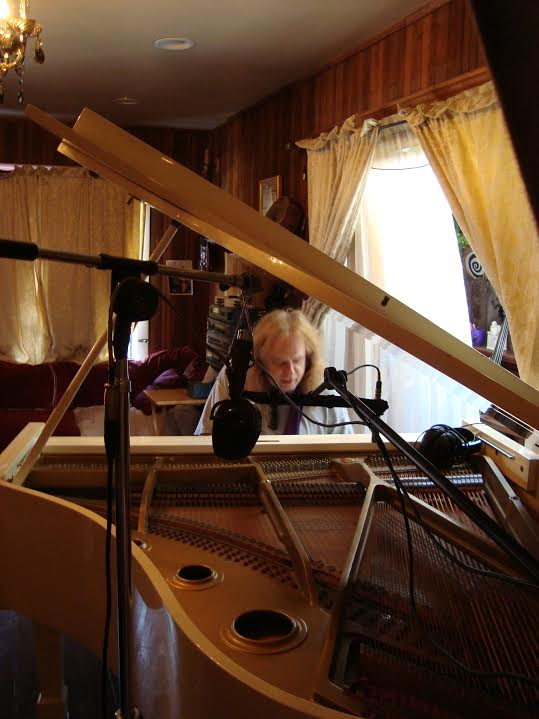
Michael Caruso – In The Studio

- "Anyone But Me" Recorded by Jeff Paris for his EP Life of My Broken Heart for USG Records written by Michael Caruso/Jeff Paris (Recorded: 1997)
- "Better Way To Die" from John Purdell's Hindsight album for Jackal Entertainment written by Michael Caruso/John Purdell/Paul Schwartz with Caruso on background vocals (Released 1998)
- "Runaway Love" was recorded by Chris LeDoux for his One Road Man album on Capitol Records- Nashville; and by Rita Coolidge for her Thinkin' About You release for Innerworks Records International written by Michael Caruso, Dennis Matkosky & Tamara Champlin (Released: 1998)
- "Shoo-Rah" & "I'm Not Your Lover" were included on Rita Coolidge's Thinkin' About You, again, compositions by Caruso/Champlin/Matkosky (Released: 1998) and "Shoo-Rah" has since been recorded by Caruso himself on For Tessa Records (Released August 13, 2013)
- "Don't Get Me Dreamin' " was written by Michael Caruso, Tamara Champlin, Blaise Tosti for Stampede's album Amame on Sony Records (Released: 2000)
- "Guns of Love" by Kathy Mattea was featured on her album Roses for Narada Records written by Caruso/Sharp/Keller (Released: 2002)
- "Louisiana Wind" was recorded by Michael LeCompt for his EP Can't Let It Go on Quarry Records written by Michael Caruso, Dennis Matkosky, Tamara Champlin & Michael LeCompt (Released 2002)
- "Second Sight" was recorded by Chris Emerson for his album Tourist for Monomoy Records written by Michael Caruso, Blaise Tosti, Stacy Widelitz (Released: 2003)
- "Corazon Roto" was recorded by Rogelio Martinez for his CD Amandote Otra Vez for Fonovisa Records; written by Michael Caruso/Richie Supa/Randy Cantor (Released: 2003)
- "Pretty Ugly" and "Pretty When She Cries (Blue 22)" recorded by the band A Perfect Day, were on the album All Over Everything released in Canada on Isba Records (a division of BMG Music) written by Michael Caruso, Tamara Champlin, Janele Woodley and Joseph Hrechka (Released: 2004)
- "Guns of Love" was recorded by Pam Rose for her album Morpheus on Grace Records written By Caruso/Sharp/Keller (Released: 2004)
- "Just Like You" and "Why Don't You Leave", 2 Caruso/LeCompt Collaborations were featured on Michael LeCompt's Unplugged CD (Released 2004)
- "I'm Not Your Lover" was recorded by The Sons of Champlin on their CD Hip Lil Dreams for Dig Music; written by Michael Caruso, Tamara Champlin, Dennis Matkosky (Released: 2005)
- "No Place Left To Fall", title track of the Bill Champlin CD for Dream Makers Music, was written by Michael Caruso, Bill Champlin and Tamara Champlin. A second track, "Tuggin' on Your Sleeve" was written by Michael Caruso, Bill Champlin and Will Champlin (Released: 2008)
- "Pretty When She Cries" was recorded by Lori Michaels for her CD Living My Life Out Loud on Reform Records written by Michael Caruso and Tamara Champlin (Released 2008)
- "What's on My Mind" was recorded by Bekka Bramlett for her CD I Got News for You on Shongaloo Records; written by Michael Caruso, Tamara Champlin, Dennis Matkosky (Released: 2009)
- "When the Devil Starts To Pray", featured tracks written and performed by Michael Caruso: title track (co written with Randy Sharp), "Claudia Jolie" (co written with Blaise Tosti); "Madelyn" (co written with Glenn Goss); "For Tessa" (co written with Trey Bruce); "Guns of Love" (co written with Randy Sharp and John Keller); "Solomon" (co written with Tamara Champlin, Dennis Matkosky, Blaise Tosti); "Tell Me What You Will" (co written with Glenn Goss and TJ McFarland); "For Tessa" (choir featuring Jeff Paris and Moon Calhoun); co-produced with Roy Braverman on For Tessa Records (Released 2011)
- "Rainin' Sunshine" was recorded live with Bill Champlin, Tamara Champlin, Will Champlin and Santa Fe and the Fat City Horns DVD Live from Las Vegas on Strokeland Records; written by Michael Caruso, Tamara Champlin, Will Champlin (Released 2012)
- "You Won't Get To Heaven Alive" was performed by Tamara Champlin on Peter Friestedt, Bill Champlin, Joseph Williams, Live DVD from Vivid Sounds Productions (Japan Release 2013)
- "True Love's Tears" a Michael Caruso, Randy Sharp Composition was recorded by Michael Caruso on For Tessa Records (Released 2014)
- "Good When You're Gone" written by Michael Caruso, Jeff Paris & Andy Kravitz was released by Michael Caruso on For Tessa Records (2015) and added to Rob Saul's Radio show as its theme.
- "Swept Away" (Michael Caruso, Tamara Champlin & Tom Saviano) from Nebraska Falls release The Real Story (Nebraska Falls Music – 2015)
- "Dreamin' of Chagall" written by Tamara Champlin, Michael Caruso, Bill Champlin (Released by Tamara Champlin on Champlinx2 Records – 2015); added to the Bleeding Secrets release by Bill Champlin & WunderGround (WunderGround Records – 2018)
- "What a Day" written by Michael Caruso & Rick Rydell Recorded by Michael Caruso on For Tessa Records (Released 2016)
- "Guns of Love" written by Michael Caruso, Randy Sharp, John Keller; Recorded by Randy Sharp on his release Impossible Things for With Any Luck Records (Released 2017)
- "Another Mile" written by Michael Caruso & Randy Sharp; Recorded by Michael Caruso on For Tessa Records (Released 2017)
- "Goodbye Is Not A Word", "You Don't Have to Do That" and "True Love's Tears", all Caruso co-writes, were released by Suzanne Cook for the Audio Arts Company (London, UK 2019)
- "Sunny Afternoon" written by Ray Davies; Recorded by Michael Caruso on For Tessa Records (Released 2019)
- "Only Love" by Manu written by Michael Caruso, Eric Bazilian & Glenn Goss on 300 Hairy Bears (Released 2020) and was screened at the 2020 Arpa International Film Festival; this tune along with its original demo "Love Is All" is part of Manu's 2022 release Sunrise
- "Between the Lines" written by Bill Champlin, Michael Caruso & Will Champlin from Champlin, Williams Friestedt Release (CWFII) Black Lodge Records (Released 2020)
- "Love Has No Heart" written by Tamara Champlin, Michael Caruso and Bill Champlin from Bill Champlin's release Livin' for Love Imagen Records (Released 2021)
- "At War with Love" written by Michael Caruso and recorded by Shari Chaskin (Released 2023)
- "Born with an Accordion" (Caruso/Goss) was on the release Healing Through the Arts Vol 1 using music and the arts to help those troubled by addiction and mental health issues. Sound Mind Network (Released 2023)
- In 2023–2025, Caruso worked as a co-writer and producer on several recordings for bands Sumthing Strange and My Next Planet. Four of the tracks were featured on the Sumthing Strange collection, Parallel Worlds (2025) and in 2026, My Next Planet "Freaks" (written by Michael Caruso & Justin Coppolino) was released by Deko Entertainment/ADA (Warner Music Group)
