= Vilify (song) =

Single by Device

from the album Device
- Released: February 15, 2013
- Recorded: 2012–2013 at David Draiman's Home Studio, in Austin, TX
- Genre: Industrial metal, hard rock
- Length: 3:39
- Label: Warner Bros.
- Songwriters: David Draiman, Geno Lenardo
- Producers: David Draiman, Geno Lenardo

Device singles chronology
"Vilify" (2013)	"You Think You Know" (2013)

Professional ratings
Review scores
Source	Rating
Artist Direct	5/5 stars

"Vilify" is the first single from American industrial metal band Device's debut album of the same name. It was released through Warner Bros. Records on February 19, 2013, and was produced by David Draiman, who is also the current lead singer of Disturbed, and Geno Lenardo, who is originally the lead guitarist of Filter.

== Background ==
David Draiman first announced his side project, Device, in May 2012. The band released its first single on February 19, 2013 for radio and digital download. A snippet of the song was first made available on the Australian iTunes Store, as a 90-second preview, with the full version having since been leaked online. The album and the song were given the Parental Advisory sticker for the band's use of explicit language in both.

== Reception ==
Rick Florino of Artist Direct calls Vilify "punchy, potent, and powerful", and describes Draiman's voice as "both haunting and hypnotizing as he oscillates between a soaring melody and pummeling groove." Florino says Device doesn't sound like other bands and has the power to "pave the way for the future." "Vilify" was featured on Loudwire's Top 20 Songs for the week of February 24 through March 2 at No. 20.

== Music video ==
The accompanying video was released on February 19. It depicts the band performing in a mostly dark environment with flashes of blinding white light as an android-like creature appears to be born. A behind the scenes video for the music video was released on February 18, 2013.

== Track listing ==
Digital download, promotioanl CD
No.	Title	Length
1.	"Vilify"	3:39

Amazon digital download
No.	Title	Length
1.	"Vilify" (Explicit)	3:40
2.	"Vilify" (Censored)	3:40

Remixes
No.	Title	Length
2.	"Vilify (Future Funk Squad Club Mix)"	6:36
3.	"Vilify (Philify Remix)"	5:37

== Chart positions ==
Chart (2013)	Peak Position
US Mainstream Rock (Billboard)	1
US Rock Airplay (Billboard)	21
