= Recording consciousness =

Sound recording terminology

Recording consciousness as described by Bennett (1980, p. 114) is the consequence of "a society which is literally wired for sound" in which, according to Middleton (1990, p. 88) "this consciousness defines the social reality of popular music."

== Overview ==
"Acoustic instruments and unamplified, 'pure'-tone singing can now not be heard except as contrasts to more recent kinds of sounds, just as live performances are inevitably 'checked' against memories of recordings," and "live performances have to try to approximate the sounds which inhabit this consciousness."

"Similarly, musicians learn to play, and learn specific songs, from records, and so 'recording consciousness' helps to explain the ubiquity of non-literate composition methods: 'sheet music is just for people who can't hear' (musician quoted in Bennett 1980, p. 139) The structure of this consciousness has been produced by various elements, among them experience of editing techniques, reverberation and echo, use of equalization to alter timbre, high decibel levels, both in general and in particular parts of the texture (notably, strong bass-lines), and the 'polyvocality' created by multi-mike or multi-channel recording. Mixing different 'earpoints' produces a 'way of hearing [that] is an acoustic expectation for anyone who listens to contemporary recordings. It cannot be achieved without the aid of electronic devices. It has never before existed on earth' (ibid, p. 119)." (Middleton 1990, p. 88)

== See also ==
- Recording studio as an instrument
