= Greatest Hits Live! (Lita Ford album) =

Live album by Lita Ford
- Released: May 8, 2000
- Recorded: EMI Studios, Hollywood, California (studio recording)
- Genre: Glam metal, hard rock
- Length: 67:09
- Label: Deadline/Cleopatra
- Producer: Lita Ford

Lita Ford chronology
Black (1995)	Greatest Hits Live! (2000)	Wicked Wonderland (2009)

Greatest Hits Live! is the first live album released by American hard rock singer and guitarist Lita Ford. The first track of the album is a new song recorded at EMI Studios in Hollywood. The rest of the album was recorded in an unknown location in Southern California, probably during the Dangerous Curves tour.

The album was re-issued in 2004 by Cleopatra Records with the title In Concert and again by Deadline Records in 2006 with the original title and a slightly different cover.

== Track listing ==
1. "Nobody's Child" (Lita Ford, Michael Dan Ehmig, Glen Burtnik) - 4:23
2. "Larger Than Life" (Ehmig, Ford, Myron Grombacher) - 4:20
3. "What Do You Know about Love" (Randy Cantor, Michael Caruso, Cal Curtis) – 3:59
4. "Black Widow" (Ehmig, David Ezrin, Ford, Joe Taylor) - 3:47
5. "Holy Man" (Ford, Ehmig) - 4:48
6. "Can't Catch Me" (Ford, Ian Kilmister, Ezrin) - 4:13
7. "Falling In and Out of Love" (Ford, Ezrin, Nikki Sixx) - 5:43
8. "Bad Love" (Ford, Ehmig) - 4:53
9. "The Ripper" (Ford, Ezrin) - 5:17
10. "Close My Eyes Forever" (Ford, Ozzy Osbourne) - 5:27
11. "Shot of Poison" (Ford, Jim Vallance, Grombacher) - 3:45
12. "Hungry" (Ford, Ehmig) - 5:08
13. "Kiss Me Deadly" (Mick Smiley) - 5:12
14. "Rock Candy" (Sammy Hagar, Ronnie Montrose) - 6:14

== Personnel ==
- Lita Ford - lead vocals, guitars, producer

=== Studio band ===
- Glen Burtnik - acoustic guitars, backing vocals
- Phil Chen - bass
- Rodger Carter - drums

=== Live band ===
- David Ezrin - keyboards, backing vocals
- Joe Taylor - guitars, backing vocals
- Tommy Caradonna - bass, backing vocals
- Jimmy DeGrasso - drums

=== Production ===
- Ryan Greene - studio engineer
- Biff Dawes - live engineer
- Bobby Bradley - mixing
- Eric Wolf - mastering
