= Dangerous Curves (album) =

Studio album by Lita Ford
- Released: November 12, 1991
- Recorded: 1990–1991
- Studios: Ocean Way (Hollywood); Sunset Sound (Hollywood)
- Genre: Glam metal
- Length: 43:53
- Label: RCA Records
- Producers: Tom Werman, Eddie DeLena

Lita Ford chronology
Stiletto (1990)	Dangerous Curves (1991)	The Best of Lita Ford (1992)

Singles from Dangerous Curves
- 1. "Shot of Poison" / "Larger Than Life" Released: October 1991; 2. "Playin' with Fire" / "Holy Man" Released: 1992

Professional ratings
Review scores
Source	Rating
AllMusic	3/5 stars
Collector's Guide to Heavy Metal	0/10
Kerrang!	3/5 stars

Dangerous Curves is the fifth solo studio album by American hard rock/heavy metal singer and guitarist Lita Ford, released in 1991. Though it was a popular release and received heavy video rotation on MTV, the album was not as successful as its predecessor due to its predominantly glam metal sound and the fact that musical tastes were shifting towards alternative rock in late 1991. The album charted on both the US and UK charts in 1992 and the single, "Shot of Poison", was nominated for a Grammy Award for Best Female Rock Vocal Performance in 1993. This was Lita Ford's second ever Grammy nomination and her first since 1984's Dancin' on the Edge.

The track "Black Widow" is not to be confused for the track "Die for Me Only (Black Widow)" from Ford's 1983 debut Out for Blood.

== Track listing ==
Side one

1. "Larger Than Life" (Michael Dan Ehmig, Lita Ford, Myron Grombacher) – 3:53
2. "What Do Ya Know About Love?" (Randy Cantor, Michael Caruso, Cal Curtis) – 3:52
3. "Shot of Poison" (Ford, Grombacher, Jim Vallance) – 3:31
4. "Bad Love" (Ehmig, David Ezrin, Ford, Joe Taylor) – 4:20
5. "Playin' with Fire" (Ehmig, Ford, Vallance) – 4:08

Side two

6. "Hellbound Train" (Ehmig, Ezrin, Ford, Grombacher, Kevin Savigar) – 6:06
7. "Black Widow" (Ehmig, Ezrin, Ford, Taylor) – 3:30
8. "Little Too Early" (Rick Blakemore, Al Pitrelli, Joe Lynn Turner) – 2:58
9. "Holy Man" (Ehmig, Ford) – 4:42
10. "Tambourine Dream" (Ehmig, Ford, Grombacher) – 4:53
11. "Little Black Spider" (Ford) – 1:46

== Personnel ==
Band members

- Lita Ford - lead vocals, guitars
- Joe Taylor - guitar
- David Ezrin - keyboards
- Matt Bissonette - bass guitar
- Myron Grombacher - drums

Additional musicians

- Howard Leese - guitar
- Jeff Scott Soto, Debbie Holiday, Joe Lynn Turner, Michael Caruso, Anne Marie Hunter - backing vocals

Production

- Tom Werman - producer, mixing
- Eddie DeLena - associate producer, engineer, mixing
- Clif Norrell, Mike Piersante - assistant engineers
- Michael Dan Ehmig - vocal arrangements
- Howie Weinberg - mastering at Masterdisk, New York
- Neal Avron - remastering engineer

== Charts ==
Chart (1991–1992)	Peak position
Australian Albums (ARIA)	172
UK Albums (Official Charts)	51
US Billboard 200	132
