= Country Bones =

Country music band

Country Bones is a country music band. The lead singer is Larry "Bones" Dennison, formerly of The Tonight Show Band and Dio. It was the featured musical guest on Tuesday, April 28 on “The Tonight Show with Jay Leno”., They have released a single, Let It Ride. Their debut album was released in May on CD via the band's website, and will be released in June via iTunes and AmazonMP3. The album features Richard Fortus and Matt Tecu. Their second album was released in January 2014 and is entitled Shake.
