= Living Like a Runaway =

Studio album by Lita Ford
- Released: June 4, 2012 (Europe); June 19, 2012 (North America)
- Recorded: 2011–2012
- Studio: Wazoo Music Studio, Pelham, New Hampshire and Metronome Studio, Brookline, New Hampshire
- Genre: Heavy metal
- Length: 40:56
- Label: SPV/Steamhammer
- Producer: Gary Hoey

Lita Ford chronology
Wicked Wonderland (2009)	Living Like a Runaway (2012)	The Bitch Is Back ... Live (2013)

Living Like a Runaway is the eighth solo studio album from American rock-musician Lita Ford, released in June 2012. This is the first album of Ford's to be released on SPV/Steamhammer Records. "SPV gets who I am, my work, and what it takes to bring this project to life. I'm very excited to have them on my team," says Ford.

The album was co-written and produced by rock guitarist Gary Hoey and represents a return to form for Lita, who drew inspiration from her "ugly divorce" from Nitro singer Jim Gillette.

"Gary Hoey and I wanted to approach this record by getting back to basics," she said. "We want to strip away all the electronics and plug-ins and keep it to vocals, guitar, bass, and drums. Going back to basics is going back to what punk, metal and The Runaways was for me."

She added, "[The album title] Living Like a Runaway means freedom and empowerment. To do what I want and to pursue my dreams while answering to no one."

== Reception ==
Professional ratings
Review scores
Source	Rating
AllMusic	3/5 stars
About.com	4/5 stars

Since its release, Living Like a Runaway has been met with positive reviews. Reviewer William Clark of Guitar International.com gave the album a positive review, saying "If you take a step back from the powerful storyline, the music itself is classic Lita Ford, and that’s what really brings Living Like a Runaway over the top".

== Track listing ==
1. "Branded" (Lita Ford, Gary Hoey) - 3:47
2. "Hate" (Ford, Michael Dan Ehmig, Hoey) - 3:55
3. "The Mask" (Ford) - 4:09
4. "Living Like a Runaway" (Ford, Ehmig, Hoey) - 4:47
5. "Relentless" (Hoey) - 3:48
6. "Mother" (Ford) - 2:55
7. "Devil in My Head" (Ford, Ehmig, Hoey) - 5:22
8. "Asylum" (Ford, Hoey) - 4:34
9. "Luv 2 Hate U" (Ford, Ehmig, Hoey) - 3:45
10. "A Song to Slit Your Wrists By" (Nikki Sixx) - 3:54 (58 cover)
11. "Boiling Point" (Ford, Ehmig) - 4:09 (iTunes bonus track)
12. "Bad Neighborhood" (Ford, Doug Aldrich) (digipak bonus track) - 3:43
13. "The Bitch Is Back" (Elton John, Bernie Taupin) - 3:39 (digipak bonus track, Elton John cover)

== Personnel ==
- Lita Ford - lead and backing vocals, guitars, keyboards, executive producer
- Gary Hoey - guitars, bass, keyboards, backing vocals, co-lead vocals on "Love 2 Hate U", producer, engineer, mixing
- Matt Scurfield - drums
- The Uptown Horns:
  - Crispin Cioe - baritone/tenor/alto saxophone
  - Arno Hecht - tenor saxophone
  - Larry Etkin - trumpet
- Mickey Kanan, Tayla Lemieux - backing vocals
- Doug Aldrich - guitar on "Bad Neighborhood"
- Pete "Boardz" Peloquin - drum engineer, assistant mixing engineer (Metronome Media Group)
- Bobby Collin - executive producer
