= Kiss Me Deadly (song) =

Single by Lita Ford

from the album Lita
- B-side: "Broken Dreams"
- Released: 1988
- Recorded: 1987
- Studio: Record One (Sherman Oaks, CA)
- Genre: Hair metal
- Length: 4:01
- Label: RCA
- Songwriter: Mick Smiley
- Producer: Mike Chapman

Lita Ford singles chronology
"Gotta Let Go" (1984)	"Kiss Me Deadly" (1988)	"Back to the Cave" (1988)

"Kiss Me Deadly" is a 1988 song by Lita Ford, appearing on the album Lita released in the same year. Written by Mick Smiley, it is regarded as one of Ford's signature songs, and is the second highest-charting single of her solo career, after "Close My Eyes Forever" from the same album.

== Music video ==
The song's video was placed on The New York Times' list of the "15 Essential Hair-Metal Videos".

== Track listing ==
1. "Kiss Me Deadly" – 3:59
2. "Broken Dreams" – 5:13

== Chart performance ==
Chart (1988–89)	Peak position
US Billboard Hot 100	12
US Album Rock Tracks (Billboard)	40
Australia (ARIA Charts)	97
Canada (RPM (magazine))	19
New Zealand (Recorded Music NZ)	21
UK Singles (Official Charts)	75

== Popular culture ==
- The song received renewed interest thirty years after its release when it was featured in the 2019 superhero film Captain Marvel.
- This song is featured in episode 9 of RuPaul's Drag Race season 17 in the lip sync competition between Kori King and Lydia B Kollins.
