= Lita (album) =

Studio album by Lita Ford
- Released: February 2, 1988
- Recorded: 1987
- Studios: Record One, Los Angeles
- Genre: Hair metal
- Length: 40:15
- Label: RCA Victor
- Producer: Mike Chapman

Lita Ford chronology
Dancin' on the Edge (1984)	Lita (1988)	Stiletto (1990)

Singles from Lita
- 1. "Kiss Me Deadly" / "Broken Dreams" Released: April 1988; 2. "Back to the Cave" (remix) / "Under the Gun" Released: November 1988; 3. "Close My Eyes Forever" (remix) / "Under the Gun" Released: February 1989; 4. "Falling In and Out of Love" (remix) / "Fatal Passion" Released: 1989

Professional ratings
Review scores
Source	Rating
AllMusic	4/5 stars
The Collector's Guide to Heavy Metal	4/10
Kerrang!	4.5/5 stars
The Rolling Stone Album Guide	3/5 stars

Lita is the third solo studio album by American guitarist, vocalist, and songwriter Lita Ford. Released in February 1988, it was her first for RCA Records and her first published with the supervision of new manager Sharon Osbourne. Musicians Don Nossov and Myron Grombacher, who were best known for being the rhythm section of the successful American singer Pat Benatar, joined Ford for the recording sessions while Charles Dalba and Tommy Caradonna played drums and bass guitar during the promotional tour.

The album is Ford's most successful, reaching No. 29 on the US Billboard 200 chart and being certified platinum. It produced the hit singles "Close My Eyes Forever" (a duet with Ozzy Osbourne) and "Kiss Me Deadly" which peaked at numbers 8 and 12 respectively on the Billboard Hot 100 chart. "Kiss Me Deadly" was named the 76th best hard rock song of all time by VH1.

== Track listing ==
Side one
No.	Title	Writer(s)	Length
1.	"Back to the Cave"	Mike Chapman, David Ezrin, Lita Ford	4:01
2.	"Can't Catch Me"	Ezrin, Ford, Lemmy Kilmister	3:58
3.	"Blueberry"	Chapman	3:47
4.	"Kiss Me Deadly"	Mick Smiley	4:01
5.	"Falling In and Out of Love"	Ezrin, Ford, Nikki Sixx	5:07

Side two
No.	Title	Writer(s)	Length
6.	"Fatal Passion"	Ezrin, Ford, Punky Peru	4:41
7.	"Under the Gun"	Ford	4:48
8.	"Broken Dreams"	Ezrin, Ford	5:12
9.	"Close My Eyes Forever"	Ford, Ozzy Osbourne	4:42
Total length:			40:17

== Personnel ==
Band members

- Lita Ford – guitar, vocals
- David Ezrin – keyboards
- Don Nossov – bass guitar
- Myron Grombacher – drums

Additional musicians

- Craig Krampf – additional percussion and drums
- Ozzy Osbourne – duet vocals on "Close My Eyes Forever"
- Llory McDonald, Mike Chapman – background vocals

Production

- Mike Chapman – producer
- George Tutko – engineer, mixing at Village Recorders and One on One Recording Studios, Los Angeles
- Brett Swain, Charlie Brocco, Jimmy Hoyson, Toby Wright – assistant engineers
- George Marino – mastering at Sterling Sound, New York
- Ria Lewerke – art direction
- Moshe Brakha – photography

== Charts ==
Chart performance for Lita
Chart (1988)	Peak position
Australian Albums (ARIA)	74
Canada Top Albums/CDs (RPM)	42
Finnish Albums (The Official Finnish Charts)	38
New Zealand Albums (RMNZ)	45
US Billboard 200	29

== Certifications ==
Certifications for Lita
Region	Certification	Certified units/sales
Canada (Music Canada)	Gold	50,000^{^}
United States (RIAA)	Platinum	1,000,000^{^}
^{^} Shipments figures based on certification alone.
