= Out for Blood (Lita Ford album) =

Studio album by Lita Ford
- Released: 1983
- Studios: Fidelity (North Hollywood); Cherokee (Hollywood); Fiddler (Hollywood)
- Genres: Hard rock; heavy metal
- Length: 35:19
- Label: Mercury
- Producers: Neil Merryweather, Artie Ripp, Joel Soiffer

Lita Ford chronology
Out for Blood (1983)	Dancin' on the Edge (1984)

Singles from Out of Blood
- 1. "Out for Blood" / "Just a Feeling" Released: 1983

Re-released cover art

Professional ratings
Review scores
Source	Rating
AllMusic	3/5 stars
The Collector's Guide to Heavy Metal	5/10
Kerrang!	(mixed)

Out for Blood is the debut solo studio album by American guitarist, vocalist, and songwriter Lita Ford, formerly of the band the Runaways.

The original cover art for this album featured Lita standing in front of a spiderweb holding a broken blood-spurting guitar. It was later replaced with a cover of Lita standing in front of a purple background with her guitar.

The album's artwork saw Ford adopting a very heavy metal-inspired image, an image she would maintain for much of the next decade.

The track "Die for Me Only (Black Widow)" is not to be confused for the track "Black Widow" from Ford's 1991 album Dangerous Curves.

== Track listing ==
Side one

1. "Out for Blood" (Lita Ford, Neil Merryweather) – 2:56
2. "Stay with Me Baby" (Ford) – 4:31
3. "Just a Feeling" (Ford) – 4:41
4. "Ready, Willing and Able" (Ford, Merryweather) – 2:59
5. "Die for Me Only (Black Widow)" (Ford, Merryweather) – 3:05

Side two

1. "Rock 'n' Roll Made Me What I Am Today" (Pete Heimlich) – 2:53
2. "If You Can't Live with It" (Ford) – 4:20
3. "On the Run" (Ford, Merryweather) – 2:50
4. "Any Way That You Want Me" (Chip Taylor) – 3:36
5. "I Can't Stand It" (Ford) – 3:28

== Personnel ==
The Lita Ford Band

- Lita Ford – lead & rhythm guitars, lead vocals
- Neil Merryweather – bass, harmony vocals, backing vocals, producer, mixing
- Dusty Watson – drums, backing vocals

Production

- Artie Ripp – producer, engineer, mixing
- Joel Soiffer – producer, engineer, mixing
- Bruce Wildstein, Cliff Zellman, John Hanlon, Laura Livingstone, Rick Neiswonger – assistant engineers
- Andrew Nicholas – mastering
- Glen Christensen – art direction
- Herbert Wheeler Worthington III – photography
