= Dancin' on the Edge =

Studio album by Lita Ford
- Released: 28 May 1984
- Studios: Power Station, New York City, New York; The Warehouse, Philadelphia, Pennsylvania; Studio 4, Philadelphia, Pennsylvania
- Genres: Glam metal, heavy metal
- Length: 38:05
- Label: Mercury
- Producer: Lance Quinn

Lita Ford chronology
Out for Blood (1983)	Dancin' on the Edge (1984)	Lita (1988)

Singles from Dancin on the Edge
- 1. "Gotta Let Go" / "Run with the $" Released: April 1984; 2. "Dressed to Kill" Released: 1984 (promo)

Professional ratings
Review scores
Source	Rating
AllMusic	3/5 stars
The Collector's Guide to Heavy Metal	6/10

Dancin' on the Edge is second solo studio album by American guitarist, vocalist, and songwriter Lita Ford. It was her final release with Mercury Records, as she departed to sign with RCA Records in 1987. The album was a moderate commercial success, reaching No. 66 of the US Billboard 200 chart. The album was also nominated for a Grammy Award in category of Best Female Rock Vocal Performance.

== Overview ==
Ford's second solo release after leaving the Runaways in 1979, Dancin' on the Edge features the debut of her new backing band, featuring drummer Randy Castillo, who would soon join Ozzy Osbourne's band, and bassist Hugh McDonald, who later joined Bon Jovi (McDonald had previously played with Jon Bon Jovi in the All Star Revue; the group that recorded the hit "Runaway.") Dancin' on the Edge surpassed the success of Ford's debut album Out For Blood in both sales and airplay.

Music videos for the singles "Gotta Let Go" and "Dressed to Kill" received heavy rotation on MTV during the summer of 1984. "Gotta Let Go" was a minor hit in England, reaching #94 on the UK Singles Chart. The music video for "Dressed to Kill" featured a cameo from Ford's then-fiancée, Tony Iommi of Black Sabbath. Ford toured relentlessly in support of the album for most of 1984, culminating in a pre-Headbangers Ball concert special recorded for MTV.

== Track listing ==
All songs were written by Lita Ford, except where noted.

Side one

1. "Gotta Let Go" (Ford, Geoffrey Leib) – 4:39
2. "Dancin' on the Edge" – 5:00
3. "Dressed to Kill" – 3:44
4. "Hit 'n Run" (Leib, Moon Calhoun) – 3:54

Side two

5. "Lady Killer" – 3:41
6. "Still Waitin'" – 4:20
7. "Fire in My Heart" – 3:46
8. "Don't Let Me Down Tonight" – 4:42
9. "Run with the $" – 4:21

== Personnel ==
Band members

- Lita Ford - guitars, vocals
- Hugh McDonald - bass guitar
- Randy Castillo - drums

Additional musicians

- Geoff Leib - synthesizer, backing vocals
- Robbie Kondor, Aldo Nova - synthesizer

Production

- Lance Quinn - producer
- Larry Alexander - engineer, mixing
- Malcolm Pollack, Obie O'Brien, Phil Nicole, Gary King - engineers
- Bob Ludwig - mastering at Masterdisk, New York
- Barry Levine - photography

== Charts ==
Chart (1984)	Peak position
UK Albums (Official Charts)	96
US Billboard 200	66
