= Wicked Wonderland (album) =

Studio album by Lita Ford
- Released: October 2, 2009 (Europe); October 6, 2009 (US)
- Genres: Heavy metal; glam metal; industrial metal
- Length: 65:30
- Labels: earMusic/Edel (Europe); JLRG Entertainment (US)
- Producers: Lita Ford, Jim Gillette, Greg Hampton

Lita Ford chronology
Greatest Hits Live! (2000)	Wicked Wonderland (2009)	Living Like a Runaway (2012)

Professional ratings
Review scores
Source	Rating
Allmusic	(unfavorable)
Chronicles of Chaos	3.5/10 stars

Wicked Wonderland is the seventh solo studio album by American rock-musician Lita Ford and her first of new material in almost 15 years.

Ford said about the album: "Everybody has their own 'Wicked Wonderland'. It's a place where you can do whatever you want and get as freaky as you feel. These songs are my version of that - they're all about my life…well, the parts that happen when the kids are in bed and my husband and I get into the boudoir."(...)"This is definitely the heaviest stuff I've ever recorded. I've evolved and matured as a person and so has my music. It's lyrically very real." In her 2016 memoir, Ford disowned the album.

In October, 2009 the album also was released as limited edition vinyl LP, with modified track listing (without two last songs as well as with different track order) and different artwork. With 15 songs in it, the album is 1 hour and 15 minutes long.

== In popular culture ==
The track "Betrayal" is one of the 108 songs that appear in the Xbox 360 and PlayStation 3 video game, Brütal Legend, to which Lita also contributed her likeness and voice to the character "Rima, Queen of the Zaulia". The track is featured as background music for one of the cutscenes in the game's story mode, and can be played on the in-game radio once unlocked.

== Track listing ==
All tracks are written by Lita Ford and Greg Hampton.

No.	Title	Length
1.	"Crave"	3:46
2.	"Piece (Hell Yeah)"	3:41
3.	"Patriotic S.O.B."	4:32
4.	"Scream 4 Me"	3:57
5.	"Inside"	4:12
6.	"Wicked Wonderland"	3:50
7.	"Indulge"	4:42
8.	"Love"	5:31
9.	"Betrayal"	3:58
10.	"Sacred"	4:34
11.	"Truth"	3:55
12.	"Everything"	3:35
13.	"Bed"	6:51
14.	"Garden"	4:06
15.	"Push"	4:16

== Personnel ==
- Lita Ford - vocals, guitars, producer
- Jim Gillette - vocals, producer, engineer, mixing
- Greg Hampton - guitars, bass, keyboards, producer, mixing
- Stet Howland, Chris Collier - drums
- Jeremy Mackenzie - engineer, mixing
- Maor Appelbaum - mastering
- Piggy D. - art direction, design, photography
- Tyler Clinton - photography
- Hazmat Design - art direction, design, typography, styling

== Charts ==
Chart (2009)	Peak position
US Independent Albums (Billboard)	38
