= Stiletto (album) =

Studio album by Lita Ford
- Released: May 15, 1990
- Recorded: 1989–1990
- Studios: RCA, New York City, Cove City, Glen Cove, New York, Horizon, Wilton Connecticut, Sunset, Hollywood, California
- Genres: Pop metal; hard rock; heavy metal
- Length: 51:31
- Label: RCA
- Producer: Mike Chapman

Lita Ford chronology
Lita (1988)	Stiletto (1990)	Dangerous Curves (1991)

Singles from Stiletto
- 1. "Hungry" / "Big Gun" Released: July 1990; 2. "Lisa" / "The Ripper" Released: 1990 (UK only)

Stiletto is the fourth solo studio album by the American musician Lita Ford. It includes the singles "Hungry" and "Lisa". The album peaked at No. 52 on the Billboard 200. Ford supported the album by touring with Mötley Crüe.

== Production ==
The album was produced by Mike Chapman. "Lisa" is about Ford's mother. "Only Women Bleed" is a cover of the Alice Cooper song. Ford employed synthesized strings and horns on the album.

Chuck Eddy writes that Stiletto is "further evidence that pop-metal was the first musical genre to figure out how to turn the CD-age studio into an aesthetic advantage: There's all sortsa fetching hi-tek whooshes and wobbles and giggles and boinks that increase the fun-quotient simply by being so incidental and amusement park-like. It's an idea initiated by Def Leppard on Hysteria, which Lita obviously studied in some detail."

== Critical reception ==
Professional ratings
Review scores
Source	Rating
AllMusic	3/5 stars
Calgary Herald	B
Chicago Tribune	2.5/4 stars
Los Angeles Times	2.5/5 stars
Ottawa Citizen	2/5 stars

The Los Angeles Times wrote that "Ford rides her sex-bomb goddess image, serviceable vocals and one o' the lads guitarwork hard 'n' heavy for almost one full side of this LP." The Calgary Herald determined that "Stiletto abandons wallowing in past sub-par metal yearnings and instead tries a more mainstream approach."

The Vancouver Sun opined that Ford "just doesn't have the heavy metal vocal screech or the powerthud music to make her songs more than mildly amusing." The Orlando Sentinel panned the "stupid lyrics and ... bombastic guitar solos."

In 1991, Eddy ranked Stiletto at number 436 in his list of the 500 best heavy metal albums ever.

== Track listing ==
Side one

1. "Your Wake Up Call" (Mike Chapman, David Ezrin, Lita Ford, Myron Grombacher, Don Nossov) – 1:59
2. "Hungry" (Michael Dan Ehmig, Ford) – 4:57
3. "Dedication" (Chapman) – 3:34
4. "Stiletto" (Ford, Holly Knight) – 4:37
5. "Lisa" (Ehmig, Ford) – 4:45
6. "The Ripper" (Ezrin, Ford) – 5:20

Side two

1. "Big Gun" (Ford, Grombacher, Nossov) – 4:37
2. "Only Women Bleed" (Alice Cooper, Dick Wagner) – 6:03
3. "Bad Boy" (Ford, Mark Spiro) – 3:59
4. "Aces & Eights" (Ford, Grombacher, Kevin Savigar) – 4:20
5. "Cherry Red" (Ehmig, Ford) – 4:09
6. "Outro" (Ezrin, Ford, Grombacher, Nossov) – 1:56

== Personnel ==
Band members

- Lita Ford – guitar, vocals
- David Ezrin – keyboards
- Don Nossov – bass guitar
- Myron Grombacher – drums, percussion

Additional musicians

- Pablo Calagero – baritone saxophone
- Richie Cannata – tenor saxophone, horns arrangements
- Barry Danelian – trumpet
- Kevin Osborne – trombone, backing vocals, horns arrangements
- Mike Chapman, Tim Lawless, Ozzie Melendez – backing vocals
- Ralph Schuckett – strings arrangements

Production

- Mike Chapman – producer, mixing
- Marc DeSisto, Steve Marcantonio, Brian McGee, Dave Wittman – engineers
- Neal Avron, Dan Hetzel, Mike Kloster, Jay Newland, Ingrid M. Paaske, Steve Rossi, Tommy Skarupa, Vic Steffans, Ted Trewhalla, Thomas R. Yezzi – assistant engineers
- Ted Trewhalla, William Wittman – mixing
- George Marino at Sterling Sound, NYC – mastering

== Charts ==
Chart (1990)	Peak position
Australian Albums (ARIA)	77
Canada Top Albums/CDs (RPM)	54
Finnish Albums (The Official Finnish Charts)	35
Swedish Albums (Sverigetopplistan)	36
Swiss Albums (Schweizer Hitparade)	26
UK Albums (Official Charts)	66
US Billboard 200	52
