= Close My Eyes Forever =

Single by Lita Ford and Ozzy Osbourne

from the album Lita
- B-side: "Under the Gun"
- Released: February 1989
- Recorded: 1987
- Studio: Record One (Sherman Oaks, CA)
- Genre: Glam metal
- Length: 4:42
- Label: RCA
- Songwriters: Lita Ford; Ozzy Osbourne
- Producer: Mike Chapman

Lita Ford singles chronology
"Back to the Cave" (1988)	"Close My Eyes Forever" (1989)	"Falling In and Out of Love" (1989)

Ozzy Osbourne singles chronology
"Crazy Babies" (1988)	"Close My Eyes Forever" (1989)	"No More Tears" (1991)

"Close My Eyes Forever" is a duet by Lita Ford and Ozzy Osbourne from Ford's 1988 album Lita. The song was written by Ford and Osbourne while drunk. In 1989, a remix of the song was released as a single, peaking at number eight on the US Billboard Hot 100 chart in 1989, and number 25 on the US Billboard Album Rock Tracks chart. It is Ford's highest charting single and the highest charting hit of Osbourne's solo career. The song was one of four singles from the album Lita.

== Chart performance ==
=== Weekly charts ===
Weekly chart performance for "Close My Eyes Forever"
Chart (1989–1990)	Peak position
New Zealand (Recorded Music NZ)	16
Sweden (Sverigetopplistan)	14
UK Singles (Official Charts)	47
US Billboard Hot 100	8
US Album Rock Tracks (Billboard)	25

=== Year-end charts ===
Year-end chart performance for "Close My Eyes Forever"
Chart (1989)	Position
US Billboard Hot 100	77

== Certifications ==
Region	Certification	Certified units/sales
New Zealand (RMNZ)	Gold	15,000^{‡}
United States (RIAA)	Gold	500,000^{^}
^{^} Shipments figures based on certification alone.^{‡} Sales+streaming figures based on certification alone.
