= Lita Ford =

British-American musician (born 1958)

- Ford in 2008

Background information
- Born: Lita Rossana Ford; September 19, 1958 (age 68); London, England
- Origin: Long Beach, California, U.S.
- Genres: Glam metal; hard rock; heavy metal
- Occupations: Musician; singer; songwriter
- Instruments: Guitar; vocals
- Years active: 1975–1995; 2008–present
- Labels: Mercury; RCA; JLRG; SPV/Steamhammer
- Formerly of: The Runaways
- Spouse: Jim Gillette (m. 1994; div. 2011)
- Website: litafordonline.com

Lita Rossana Ford (born September 19, 1958) is a British-American musician. She was the lead guitarist for the all-female rock band the Runaways in the late 1970s, and then embarked on a successful glam metal solo career that hit its peak in the late 1980s. The 1989 single "Close My Eyes Forever", a duet with Ozzy Osbourne, remains Ford's most successful song, reaching No. 8 on the US Billboard Hot 100. Other hit songs include "Kiss Me Deadly", "Playin' with Fire", "Shot of Poison", "What Do You Know About Love?", "Gotta Let Go", "Lisa", "Back to the Cave" and "Hungry".

== Early life ==
Ford was born to Harry Lenard Ford and Isabella Benvenuto in London, England; her father was British and her mother was Italian. When she was 7 years old, she moved with her family to the United States, eventually settling in Long Beach, California.

Inspired by Ritchie Blackmore's work with Deep Purple, she began playing the guitar at the age of 11. Her vocal range is mezzo-soprano.

== Music career ==
=== The Runaways (1975–1979) ===
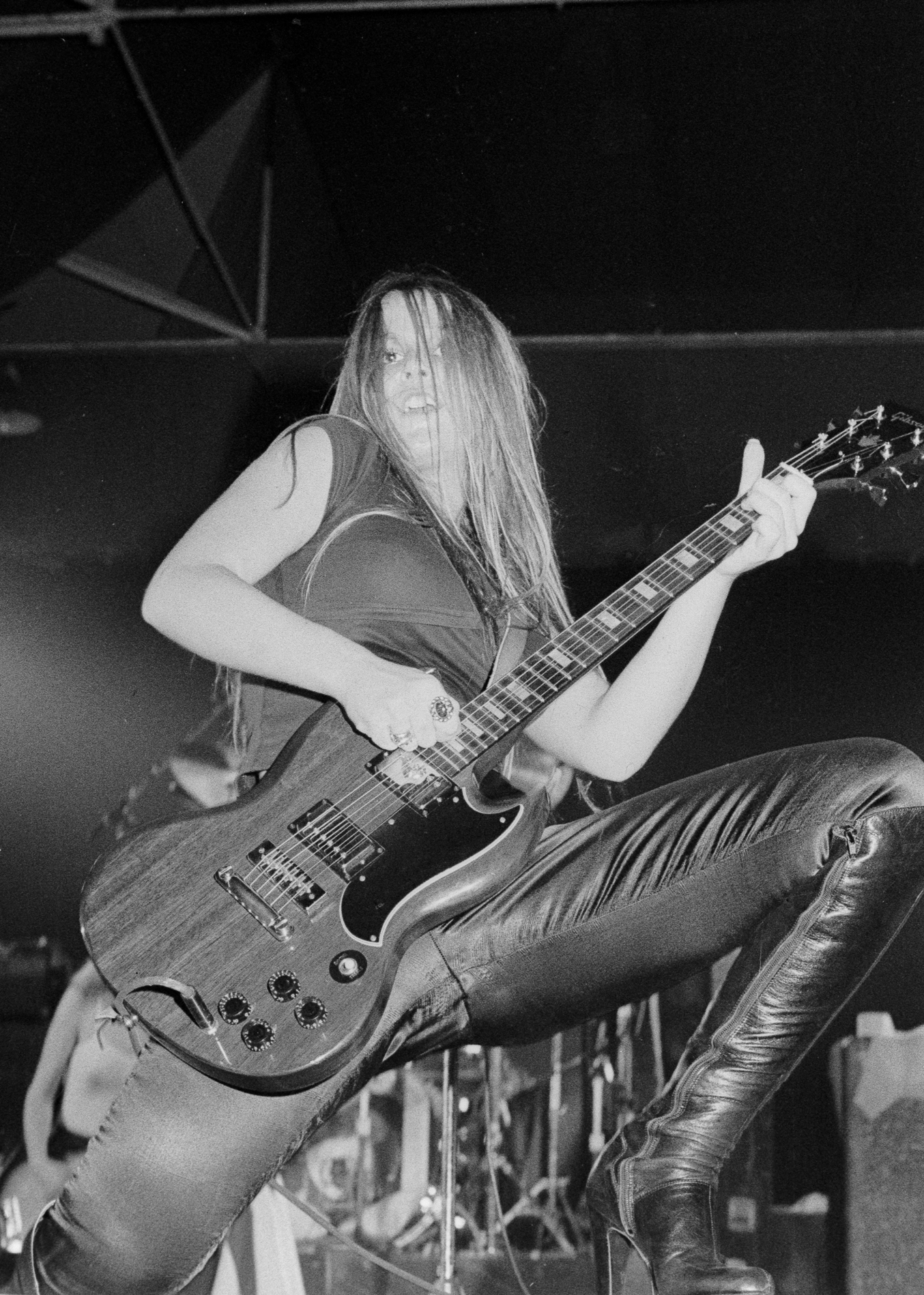
Ford performing with The Runaways in 1976

In 1975, at age sixteen, Ford was recruited by recording impresario Kim Fowley to join the all-female rock band The Runaways. The band soon secured a recording contract and released their first album in 1976. The band garnered significant media attention and the Runaways became a successful recording and touring act during their late-1970s heyday. Ford's lead-guitar playing became an integral element of the band's sound until their eventual break-up in April 1979.

In 2016, Ford published her autobiography, Living Like a Runaway: A Memoir, through Dey Street Books. In the book, Ford claimed that she left The Runaways temporarily in 1976, after coming to the conclusion that her bandmates "were all into girls. All of them except for Jackie [Fox]", a situation with which she did not feel comfortable.

In 1977, internal conflicts were erupting within the Runaways, who had by that time already parted ways with producer Fowley, lead singer Cherie Currie, and bassist Jackie Fox. Vocalist/guitarist Joan Jett wanted the band to shift to a more Ramones-influenced punk rock sound, while Ford and drummer Sandy West wanted to continue playing the hard rock-oriented songs for which the band had become known. With neither faction willing to compromise, the band broke up in April 1979.

=== Solo career (1982–1995) ===
In 1982, Ford signed with Mercury Records and set about launching a solo career. Her debut solo album, Out for Blood, released in 1983, was a commercial disappointment. Her next release, Dancin' on the Edge (1984) achieved moderate success, and Ford's popularity began to rise. Dancin' on the Edge included the single "Fire in My Heart", which reached the Top 10 in several countries outside the United States. The follow-up single, "Gotta Let Go", performed better. Ford said in an interview that she recorded an unreleased album with RCA Records, and Tony Iommi did not perform on it.

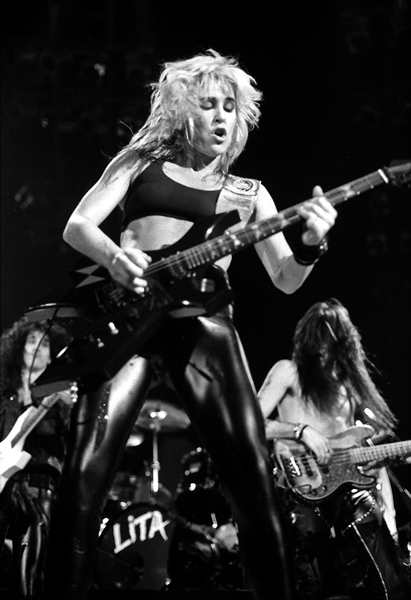
Ford performing on December 19, 1988, in the 'Olympiahalle' venue of Munich, West Germany

Ford signed with RCA Records, hired Sharon Osbourne Management, and re-emerged with a more radio-friendly pop-metal sound. In 1988, she released her most commercially successful album, Lita. The album featured several singles including "Kiss Me Deadly", "Back to the Cave", "Close My Eyes Forever", and "Falling in and Out of Love", a song co-written by Nikki Sixx of Mötley Crüe. The ballad "Close My Eyes Forever", a duet with Ozzy Osbourne, remains her most successful song, reaching No. 8 on the US Billboard Hot 100. Ford followed up the success of Lita with the album Stiletto (1990). Stiletto featured the singles "Hungry" and "Lisa" (a song dedicated to her mother). However, the album failed to match the success of her previous release. Ford's next release was Dangerous Curves (1991), which featured her last charting single to date, "Shot of Poison". Ford's final album prior to a lengthy recording hiatus was Black on the German ZYX Records.

=== Long hiatus (1996–2007) ===
By the mid-1990s, Ford had turned her attention towards raising her two young sons, causing her music career to become less of a priority. Following the release of Black in 1995, Ford did not release new material until Wicked Wonderland in 2009.

=== Return to stage (2008–present) ===
In June 2008, Ford re-emerged with a new band with Stet Howland (W.A.S.P.) on drums, playing several warm-up shows under the moniker Kiss Me Deadly prior to Rocklahoma in Pryor, Oklahoma. In June 2009, she toured the United States and Europe with a new line-up on her last fourteen shows, consisting of former Guns N' Roses guitarist Ron "Bumblefoot" Thal, drummer Dennis Leeflang, and Deepfield bassist PJ Farley.

After a long recording hiatus, Ford released Wicked Wonderland on October 6, 2009, on the JLRG Entertainment label. In an interview with ExclusiveMagazine.com, Ford spoke about her new material: "I just wanted to kick ass! I don't know what's popular, or the flavor of the day. I just wanted the music to rock! The lyrics are very personal and that's it. I wasn't going to come out in sandals with hairy armpits!"

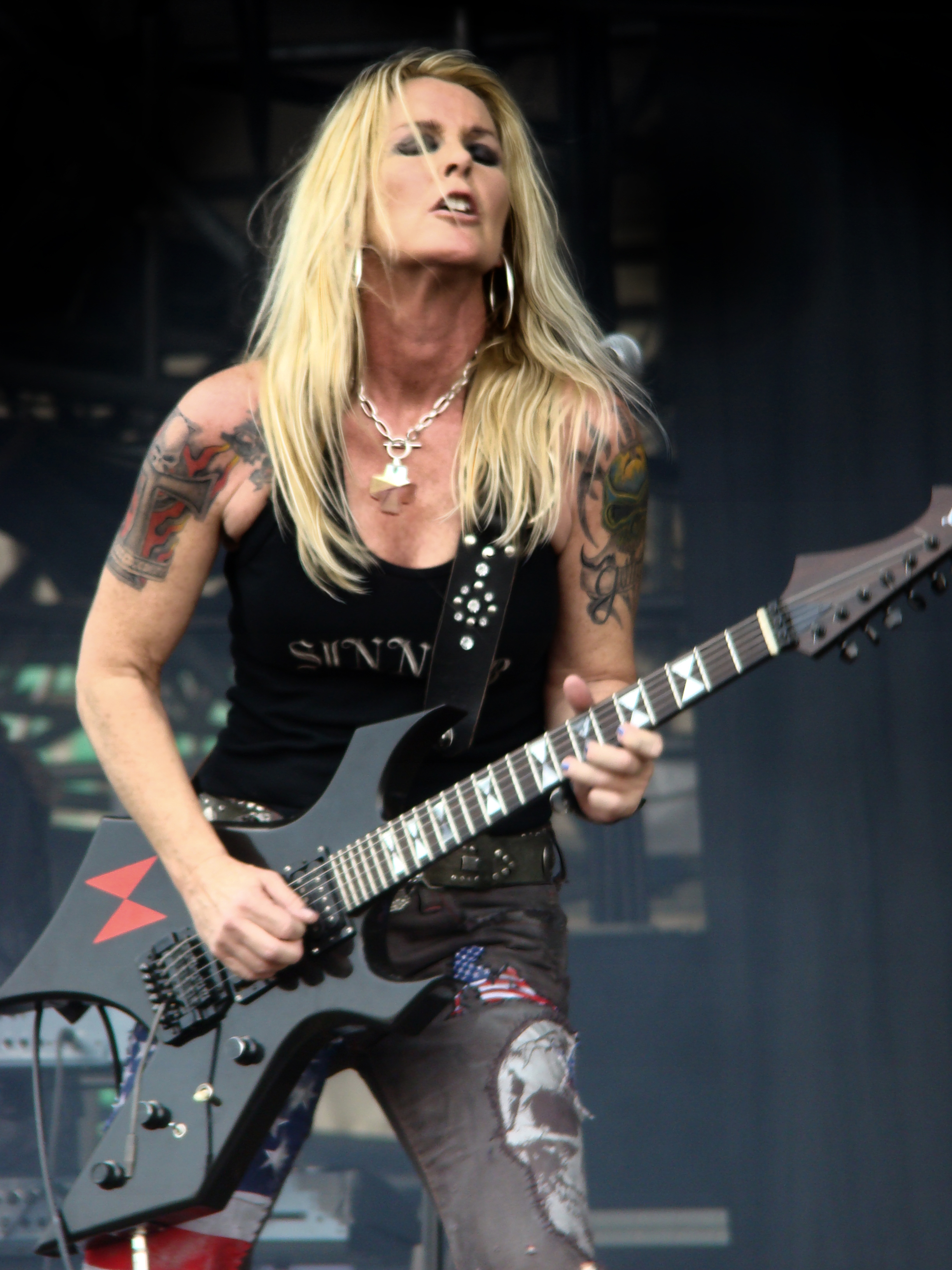
Ford performing on June 27, 2009

In May 2011, Ford promised to release a "real comeback album" later in the year with drummer Chuck Spradlin, saying that 2009's nu metal-inspired Wicked Wonderland was too much of a collaborative project with ex-husband Jim Gillette. "A lot of people have told me that they want a real Lita Ford album, and I know what they mean. They are going to get it", she was quoted as saying at the time.

Living Like a Runaway was released in June 2012 on SPV/Steamhammer Records. True to her word, the album was much more in line with her earlier work. The title is also celebratory, as Ford had recently settled differences with her former Runaways' bandmates. During 2014, she was bestowed with The Certified Legend Award by Guitar Player.

In November 2014, Heaven Below guitarist Patrick Kennison joined Ford's band.

In 2016, Ford released Time Capsule, a collection of songs she discovered on old analogue tapes from the 1980s, featuring recordings she had made with Billy Sheehan, Gene Simmons, Bruce Kulick, Robin Zander, Rick Nielsen, Dave Navarro, Rodger Carter, and Jeff Scott Soto.

On October 27, 2026, Ford released her first new song in over a decade, "Dracula". She also revealed her upcoming album, The Bride Wore Black, would be released in early 2027 on Frontiers Music.

== Acting and other projects ==
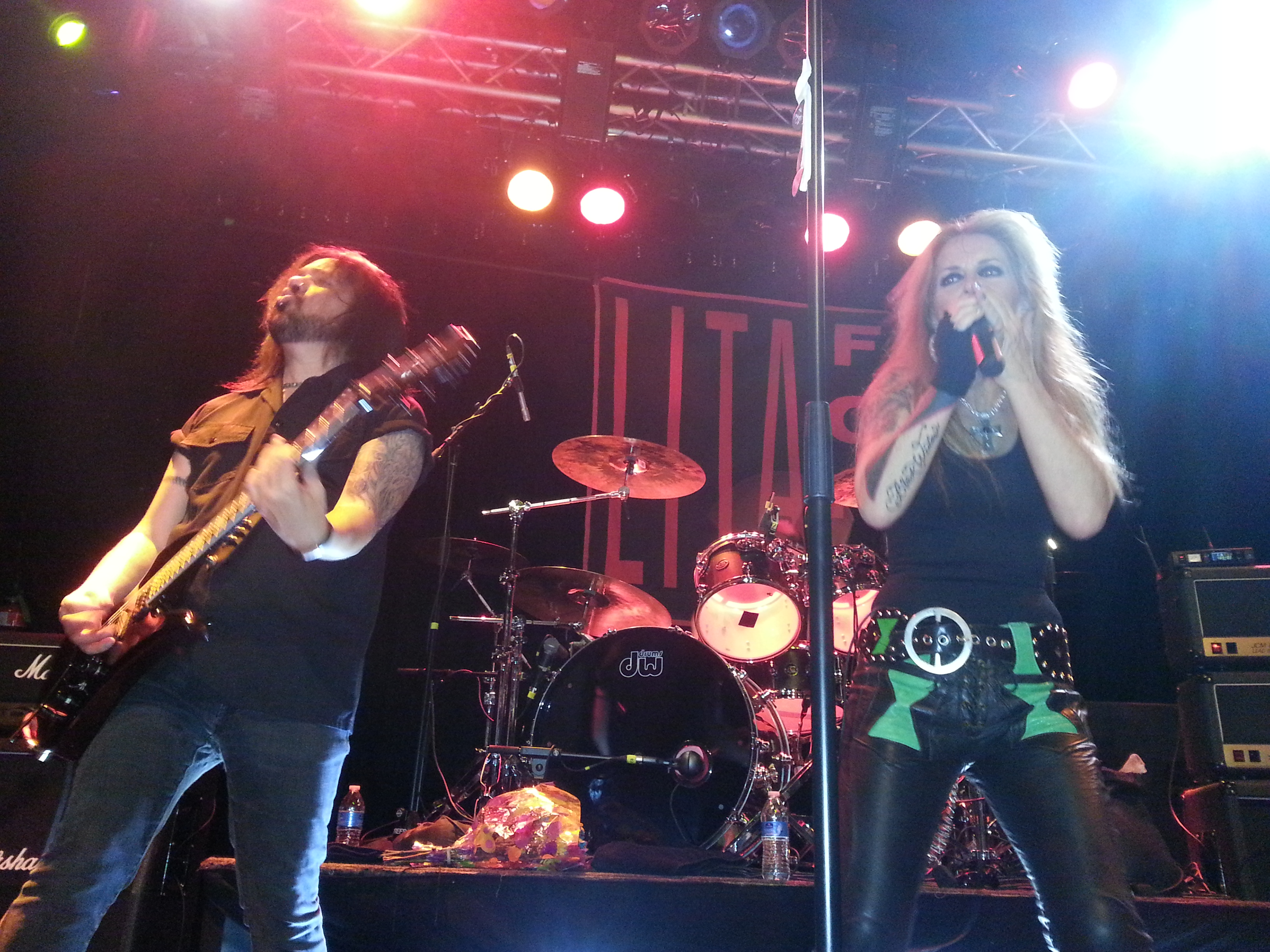
Ford performing with Patrick Kennison

During her solo career, Ford endorsed musical instrument manufacturer B.C. Rich and exclusively used several of the brand's guitars, most notably the Warlock. The 1992 TV series Howie, starring Howie Mandel, saw Ford as a regular guitarist for the house band. Ford also had a small role in the 1992 horror/comedy film Highway to Hell, playing a character called "The Hitchhiker", and played herself in a 1993 episode of Fox comedy television series Herman's Head. Ford was also asked by VH-1 to join the cast of the seventh season of the reality television program The Surreal Life in 2007, to which she declined. Ford contributed her likeness and voice to the Xbox 360, PlayStation 3, and PC video game Brütal Legend. She appears as the character Lita Halford, alongside Jack Black, Tim Curry, Ozzy Osbourne, Rob Halford, and Lemmy Kilmister. Her song "Betrayal" is also one of the 100+ songs that appear in the game.

In 2010, a major Hollywood motion picture chronicling the career of Ford's first band, The Runaways, was produced. Ford was portrayed by actress Scout Taylor-Compton in the movie, entitled The Runaways. Ford is featured extensively in the 2005 documentary film Edgeplay: A Film About the Runaways, in which she spoke candidly about her time in the all-female band. Among other things, she alludes to verbal and sexual abuse endured by the band members at the hands of their management, specifically Kim Fowley.

In 2013, Ford reunited with former Runaways bandmate Cherie Currie to record a Christmas single. The single tied into work Currie and Ford both have done on behalf of Toys for Tots, a charity run by the US Marine Corps, which gives holiday toys to children of need.

Ford appeared on the May/June 2013 cover of Making Music Magazine to discuss her life and career.

In 2014, Ford narrated The Life, Blood, and Rhythm of Randy Castillo.

Ford competed on the reality cooking show Chopped in hopes of raising $10,000 for her charity. Ford made it through the first round, but was eliminated in the second.

Ford released her autobiography Living Like a Runaway in June 2016.

Ford has also made regular cameo appearances as a guest commentator for the AXS TV show Top Ten Revealed.

== Lita Ford Guitars and Rockstar Experience ==
In 2017, Ford expanded her brand with the launch of Lita Ford Guitars, a line of graphic instruments and officially licensed replicas of the guitars used throughout her career. Personally developed by Ford in collaboration with Jim Cara, the line features the specific technical configurations required for her playing style, including high-output electronics and road-worn finishes modeled after her original stage instruments. The guitars are distinguished by custom graphics that incorporate Ford's signature stage aesthetics. The guitar line serves as the centerpiece of the Lita Ford Rockstar Experience, an interactive fan package. Through this venture, participants spend a day behind the scenes on tour with Ford, gaining an inside look at her professional touring environment before receiving a custom-built instrument from her collection.

== Lita Ford's band members ==
- Lita Ford – vocal, guitar (1983–present)
- Bobby Rock – drums (2013–present)
- Patrick Kennison – guitar, backing vocal (2014–present)
- Marten Andersson – bass, backing vocal (2022–present)

== Personal life ==
In the mid-1980s, Ford was briefly engaged to guitarist Tony Iommi of Black Sabbath. Iommi co-produced her album The Bride Wore Black, which was never released. Ford said in a 1989 interview with Kerrang! that "there's a certain amount of bad blood between Tony and I". She claimed in her autobiography that Iommi physically abused her throughout the relationship.

Ford was married to W.A.S.P. guitarist Chris Holmes for a short time during the early 1990s. After the couple divorced, Ford met former Nitro vocalist Jim Gillette in 1994; the couple were married after knowing each other for only two weeks. They have two sons, James and Rocco. The family moved to Turks and Caicos, where Gillette operated a small construction and real estate development business.

The marriage to Gillette began to crumble after he entered into negotiations with TLC for a reality TV show, tentatively titled The Gillettes: An Extreme American Family. In a March 2011 interview on the Classic Rock Revisited website, Ford claimed that she had taken a business trip to Los Angeles to discuss the show with TLC executives, and returned home to find her husband and sons not speaking to her. Ford also claimed that Gillette turned the couple's children against her by insinuating that she was going to do harm to them, after she had assumed a greater level of control in the proposed series. She subsequently claimed that Gillette began encouraging her sons to physically attack her, a situation which prompted her to seek a divorce. In a February 2011 radio interview, Ford acknowledged that her marriage to Gillette was indeed over, ending any plans for a television series. Following the end of her relationship with Gillette, Ford became an advocate for the awareness of parental alienation.

Gillette denies the allegations, adding that he was awarded full custody of their two children by the courts.

== Discography ==
- Out for Blood (1983)
- Dancin' on the Edge (1984)
- Lita (1988)
- Stiletto (1990)
- Dangerous Curves (1991)
- Black (1995)
- Wicked Wonderland (2009)
- Living Like a Runaway (2012)
- Time Capsule (2016)
- The Bride Wore Black (2027)

== Filmography ==
| Year | Film | Role | Notes |
|---|---|---|---|
| 1978 | Rock 'N Roll Sports Classic | Herself | |
| 1992 | Highway to Hell | The Hitchhiker | |
| 1992 | Howie | Herself | |
| 1993 | Herman's Head | Herself | |
| 2005 | Edgeplay | Herself | |
| 2011 | Big Time Rush | Herself | |
| 2016 | Indeed commercial | Herself/Music Teacher | Commercial |

=== Video game ===
| Year | Game | Role | Notes |
|---|---|---|---|
| 2009 | Brütal Legend | Rima | |

== See also ==
- List of British Italians
- List of glam metal bands and artists
- List of Italian-American entertainers
