= Rodney Bingenheimer =

American radio disc jockey

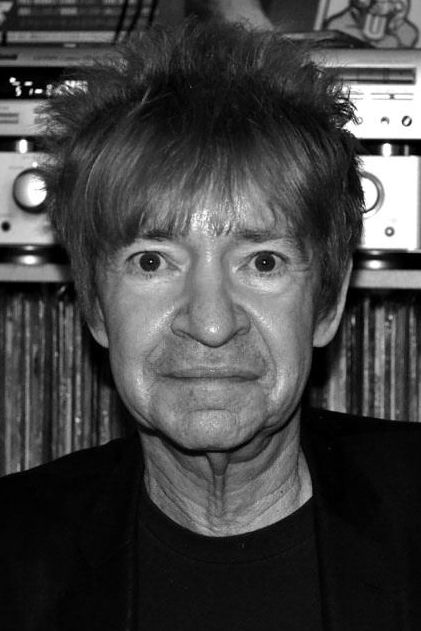
- Bingenheimer in 2016
- Born: Rodney Ray Bingenheimer; December 15, 1946 (age 79); Mountain View, California, U.S.
- Occupation: Radio DJ
- Presenting career
- Station: SiriusXM
- Style: Disc jockey
- Country: United States

Rodney Ray Bingenheimer (born December 15, 1946) is an American radio disc jockey who is best known as the host of Rodney on the ROQ, a radio program that ran on the Los Angeles rock station KROQ-FM from 1976 to 2017. In the early 1970s, he also managed a Los Angeles nightclub called Rodney Bingenheimer's English Disco.

Bingenheimer helped numerous bands become successful in the American market. He developed a reputation for being the first American DJ to identify new artists and play "edgy new bands" such as Blondie, the Ramones, the Sex Pistols, Van Halen, Guns N' Roses, Duran Duran, the Cure, Joan Jett, the Hollywood Squares, Hole, Symbol Six, No Doubt, Blur, Nirvana, Sonic Youth, the Bangles, X, the Pandoras, Germs, and many others.

In 2003, Bingenheimer was the subject of the documentary Mayor of the Sunset Strip. He was described as a "famous groupie, now respectable" by Mick Jagger, and the film documented Bingenheimer's status as a person with numerous high-profile friends. In 2007, he was honored with the 2,330th star on Hollywood Boulevard. In 2017, Bingenheimer joined SiriusXM's Little Steven's Underground Garage.

== Early life ==
Bingenheimer was born in Mountain View, California, to a star-struck mother who separated from Bingenheimer's father when he was only three years old. His father had wanted to be a celebrity but settled for attending celebrity golf events. His mother was described as a "difficult woman" and a "relentless autograph hound".

One report suggested he had a lonely childhood, since he often spent nights alone while his mother worked as a waitress. Another report suggested that the emerging rock music of the day became his "home" and a way for him to deal with the divorce of his parents. He devoured fan magazines; he was "obsessed" with stars.

When Bingenheimer was 16, his mother drove him to southern California and dropped him off at the house of Connie Stevens, and instructed him to get the star's autograph. Then she left abruptly. This was the beginning of a six-year separation from his mother, and he was on his own in Los Angeles, around the year 1963.

== Career ==
When Bingenheimer arrived in Los Angeles actor Sal Mineo dubbed him "the Mayor of the Sunset Strip". He formed friendships with pop stars of the day such as the Byrds and Sonny & Cher, for whom he was a live-in publicist. In his own words, Bingenheimer "became the talk of the town because I had the perfect Brian Jones 'do' (hairstyle)."

Bingenheimer worked as an intern at Mercury Records. He escorted British pop star David Bowie to L.A. hot spots. He auditioned for the Davy Jones part in the Monkees. While he did not get chosen, he dressed like Davy Jones and had a similar haircut then later worked as a double or stand-in for Jones in the Monkees episode "Prince and the Pauper". The Monkees stand-in role was a "break" for Bingenheimer.

Becoming Jones's stand-in was an inauguration into a peculiar cult of celebrity.

— Film critic Wesley Morris in the Boston Globe 2004.

Bingenheimer was described as shy, thin and unassuming with a "squeaky voice", usually described as soft. One report suggested his voice was "so soft you have to lean in to hear it". Another writer described his voice as soft like a "harmonica that cuts through the angry noise of today's frat jocks". His voice has also been described as "tentative" and not a "vibrating personality" or a "great radio voice" but reflecting almost "painful sincerity". He was described as having a "small, womanish face" and that he's worn the "same haircut (shaggy with bangs)" for most of his life. Actor MacKenzie Phillips reportedly called him a "gnome" and he's been described as having a faint resemblance to Andy Warhol.

Homuncular, with spindly little legs and a Prince Valiant mop atop sagging features, he now looks like a strenuously mod Don Knotts.

— Film critic David Edelstein in Slate.

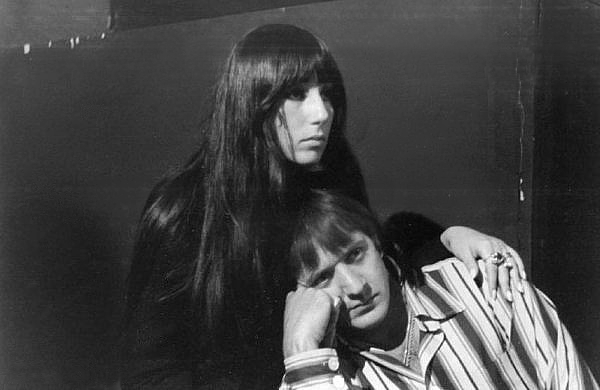
Cher noted that Bingenheimer had a certain resemblance to pop star Sonny Bono. They "bonded", with Sonny and Cher becoming almost "surrogate parents" to him.

Bingenheimer became a groupie of sorts and formed attachments with prominent artists including Sonny and Cher. He met Cher by going backstage after a concert and according to Bingenheimer, she looked at him and said "Oh my God, you look just like Sonny!" They "bonded" and he went to work for them and "they took care of me", he said.

In a later interview, Bingenheimer explained that many artists grew to like and trust him because of his sincerity, taste in music and not being pushy. Writer Alison Powell in The Guardian wrote that his "sincerity helped him gain the trust of Brian Wilson, the Beatles, even Elvis". During these years he was photographed near countless celebrities from the worlds of acting and music and Hollywood, including John Lennon and Yoko Ono, Mick Jagger, Adam Ant, the Beach Boys and many others, almost like a "real life rock'n'roll Zelig". He ingratiated himself to many stars, people liked him. He got himself a job as a gofer for the Monkees and worked as a caterer at one point.

In those days of "free love", he found many young women to "mother him" and sometimes have sex with him. He was described as being a go-between serving the needs of young women and rock stars and often had sex with women as a precondition for them meeting rock stars later on, according to writer David Edelstein in Slate magazine. Wherever he went in the music and club scene, "his face was his passport". According to Led Zeppelin vocalist Robert Plant, Bingenheimer had sex with more women than Plant.

Incidents contributed to Bingenheimer's notoriety. He and Sonny Bono were reportedly asked to leave the Hollywood restaurant Martoni's because of their hippie appearance, which reportedly prompted Bono to write the song "Laugh at Me". Bingenheimer brought Beach Boys singer Brian Wilson to the recording session for Tina Turner's lead vocal on the Phil Spector classic "River Deep, Mountain High", and he was included in a dialogue by the all-female band the GTOs on their Frank Zappa-produced LP Permanent Damage.

In the late 1960s he was hired by Nik Venet to do publicity for Linda Ronstadt's group the Stone Poneys but he became so disenchanted with the LA music scene during this period that he moved to the United Kingdom where he enjoyed the London nightclub vibe with the help of his friend David Bowie. He discovered the nascent British glam rock scene and met other emerging stars such as Rod Stewart. Bingenheimer bought many records in London. It was Bowie who suggested that Bingenheimer return to Los Angeles and open a new music club.

== Club days ==
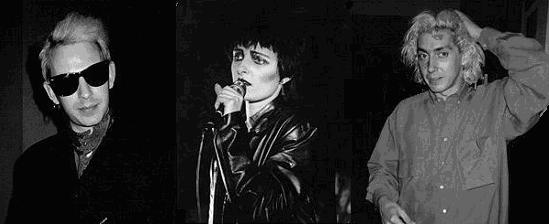
Siouxsie and the Banshees

Bingenheimer flew back and opened a nightclub initially called the E Club on Sunset Strip with his record producer partner Tom Ayres and one other partner. Outside there was the British flag, the Union Jack. It served "British bangers" and beer. It had a small "VIP area" which was a roped-off section near the dance floor.

The decor consisted mainly of mirrored walls. ... The dress of choice: feather boas, platform shoes, high-drama makeup and, of course, glitter. After three months, the club outgrew its space and reestablished itself down the street as Rodney Bingenheimer's English Disco. The dance floor was packed with glittered-booty shakers, but the real action could be found in the VIP booth. Led Zeppelin, Andy Warhol, Suzi Quatro, Alice Cooper, the New York Dolls, the Kinks, Michael Des Barres or Marc Bolan held court while getting liquored up on imported ale. ... The English Disco closed when glitter faded in the late '70s. -- reporter Kastle Waserman in the Los Angeles Times in 2001

The club opened in October 1972 at 8171 Sunset Boulevard, near his various West Hollywood apartments, and Bowie was one of the club's first guests. It subsequently moved to 7561 Sunset Blvd. and was renamed Rodney Bingenheimer's English Disco. In this version it became a favorite hangout for many rock stars (and a favored haunt for young female groupies) and through the Disco Bingenheimer introduced much of the Los Angeles music scene to glam rock. At one point, Elvis Presley dropped by for "pints of Watney's".

The English Disco also featured occasional live performances, including appearances by the New York Dolls and the Stooges in 1973, and Iggy Pop staged his infamous concert on August 11, 1974, during which he performed an improvised "play" called Murder of the Virgin (in which he was whipped by guitarist Ron Asheton, who was dressed in a Nazi uniform) and which climaxed with Iggy repeatedly slashing his chest with a knife. In October 1974, Jerome T. Youngman and the band Punk performed with fellow Detroit band Mighty Quick.

Speaking of this period, David Bowie later recalled:

Alone in LA, Rodney seemed like an island of English nowness. He even knew British singles and bands that I wasn't aware of. Rodney singlehandedly cut a path through the treacle of the Sixties, allowing all us avants to parade our sounds of tomorrow dressed in our clothes of derision. -- David Bowie

When the club closed in 1975, Bingenheimer was reportedly disenchanted with the stylized dance-genre disco to the extent that he abruptly abandoned his club "English Disco", so as not to be associated with the popular movement. But a later report suggested that a disagreement between the owners was the primary cause of the club's closure. During this brief period between his nightclub and KROQ, he made extra money selling his Beatles memorabilia to David Daniel, a friend from his nightclub and the Rainbow Bar and Grill.

== Radio days: KROQ ==
Due to his connections within the burgeoning L.A./Hollywood music scene, Bingenheimer was given a show on the then-relatively unknown Pasadena radio stations KROQ-AM and FM, called Rodney on the ROQ, which began in August 1976 and had its last broadcast June 5, 2017. His tentative voice conveyed a "painful sincerity", suggesting that he "loves the music he plays", discussing it like a matchmaker introducing a person to a song.

His radio show had an influence on the emerging Los Angeles punk scene in the late 1970s, while Bingenheimer was at stated odds with the prevailing country-rock style that dominated West Coast music. The show featured the latest punk, new wave and glam rock releases from London and New York, and labored to help artists build their careers alongside "anybody brave or stupid enough to put out a record in Los Angeles," he said. Bingenheimer later summed up his programming philosophy:

I was always anti-Eagles, anti-beards. Within a few months I was playing four solid hours of punk. – Rodney Bingenheimer

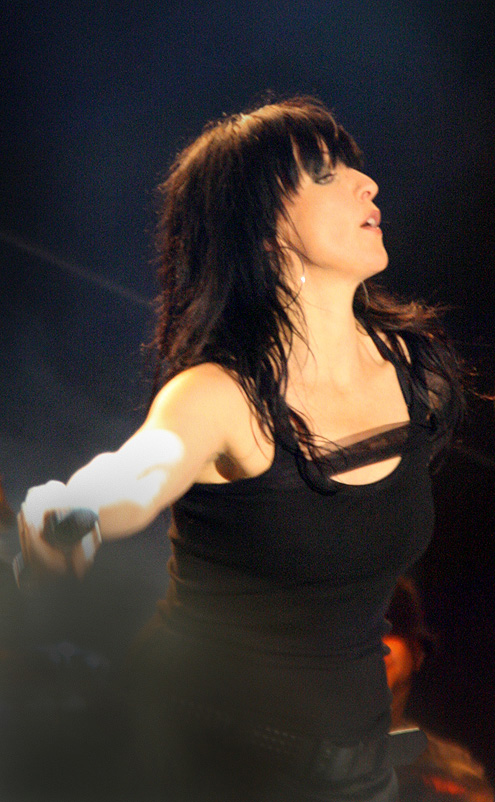
Bingenheimer helped popularize European group Nena (vocalist Nena pictured in 2008), whose hit song "99 Luftballons" became a hit in the U.S. in 1983.

Bingenheimer was one of the very few DJs on commercial radio in Los Angeles who was said to have autonomy over music selection. He has been described as the first DJ to play many up-and-coming bands, including the Runaways, Blondie, the Ramones, the Pandoras, the Hollywood Squares, Social Distortion, Van Halen, Duran Duran, Oasis, the Donnas, No Doubt, Dramarama, the Offspring, the Go-Go's, Germs, the B-52's, X, Sex Pistols, Teenage Fanclub, the Smiths, Siouxsie and the Banshees, and others.

Nena's song "99 Luftballons", after charting in German-speaking countries in early 1983, became a hit in the U.S. in 1984 after Bingenheimer played it. When Nina Hagen and Christiane Felscherinow came on his show to promote the film Christiane F. – We Children from Bahnhof Zoo, Christiane was asked by a listener what kind of music she liked. Her answer led to "99 Luftballons" being played on air. In 1983, KROQ became the first radio station to play the thrash band Suicidal Tendencies, when Bingenheimer added their song "Institutionalized" to the playlist.

Bingenheimer developed a reputation in Los Angeles for being a kingmaker for new artists. His show became an influential part of KROQ, and helped the station become a strong influence nationally. One reporter wrote "if you make it onto KROQ in America, you've made it in America. This is the house that Rodney built and which corporate radio has spread like spores across the nation."

Many bands knocked on the parking lot door of KROQ's studio in Pasadena and handed Rodney a copy of their new record or tape. If he liked a track, such as Agent Orange's 1979 hit "Bloodstains," he would play that song within the hour.

In 1978, guitarist Eddie Vincent and drummer Tad of the Hollywood Squares gave Rodney a copy of their just-released 45 at the studio door. Within minutes, Bingenheimer introduced the mysterious group to his listening audience and played "Hillside Strangler" and the song promptly charted in Record World's New Wave Hit Parade. Power pop band Candy's singer Kyle Vincent, at the time Kim Fowley's personal assistant, tells a similar story: "We had just finished recording a few tracks with Kim producing. He told me to take one of the songs over to Rodney's studio, knock on the door, and tell him that Kim says we're the illegitimate sons of Rick Springfield and the Go-Gos. On the way back to my apartment Rodney talked about it [on air] and then played it. That was pretty historic for us." Bingenheimer was also credited with giving the band Broken Bottles a big break by playing their single "Gothic Chicks".

In 1995, Bingenheimer introduced a segment to his show titled "American in London", co-hosted by Liza Kumjian-Smith, focusing on news and releases from upcoming British bands, which brought Brit Pop to the US and broke many UK bands such as Coldplay, Doves, Muse, Pulp, and more recently the Arctic Monkeys, among others.

In the final years of his weekly show, he had been relegated to the midnight to 3:00 a.m. slot on Monday mornings. In 1998, he interviewed the Toronto band Chicklet when they dropped by the station while on tour. This was his first live air interview in years, with an interview of Bad Religion said to be his last prior to this occasion. Film critic Roger Ebert quoted another employee of the station as having said that the station management was "afraid to fire him ... because he's the soul of KROQ." Bingenheimer was also responsible for three Rodney on the ROQ compilation albums as well as the compact disc and later digital download compendium. Also Flipside worked on the Rodney on the ROQ compilation album projects with Posh Boy Records and Rodney Bingenheimer to help unite the project together. The album's inserts were issues of Los Angeles Flipside Fanzine. Each insert includes the bands of each volume (music tracks and lyrics) including pictures and interviews gathered by Flipside. Rodney on The ROQ Volume 1 included Flipside Fanzine insert Issue 21 (December 1980). Rodney on The ROQ Volume 2 included Flipside Fanzine Issue 28 (November 1981). Rodney on The ROQ Volume 3 included Flipside Fanzine Issue 35 (December 82). This was a strategic time for a radio personality, a record label and a fanzine to work together to support and promote a growing musical underground and exclusive punk scene. "The Best of Rodney On The Roq" on Posh Boy Records. In an interview on June 29, 2017, talking about why his show was cancelled earlier on June 5, he mentioned that "I have no idea. They have new owners. They are going through a lot of changes right now". He continued to say, "But I was totally shocked. I went to a meeting, and I thought it was with everyone (the staff of KROQ), but it was just me. They said it would be better for me and I might not be happy there anymore."

He was present at "nearly every major interval in the evolution of rock 'n' roll" but was described as being relatively unknown outside of Los Angeles, according to the Boston Globe. But he never exploited his connections to become a "mogul", according to this report, which suggested that Bingenheimer might find such success "vulgar". Rather, he's been content to be a "hanger-on".

He is perpetually, exclusively, and proudly with the band. But at what cost? His associations with the famous have not made him rich. His friendships with the rich have not made him famous. And arriving at the end of middle age, with his mother – and, from what I can gather, his best friend – recently deceased, he's a figure of incredible loneliness. – Boston Globe film critic Wesley Morris in 2004.

Another report painted the same picture:

Rodney has facilitated the multimillion-dollar careers of the biggest names in music. He got Bowie an American record deal – and yet he lives in a modest six-room apartment in Hollywood, plays his records on a $69 phonograph bought at a chain drug store and, most recently, his fabled radio show was rudely shunted into the midnight to 3am slot. On Sundays. – The Guardian reporter Alison Powell.

== Personal life ==
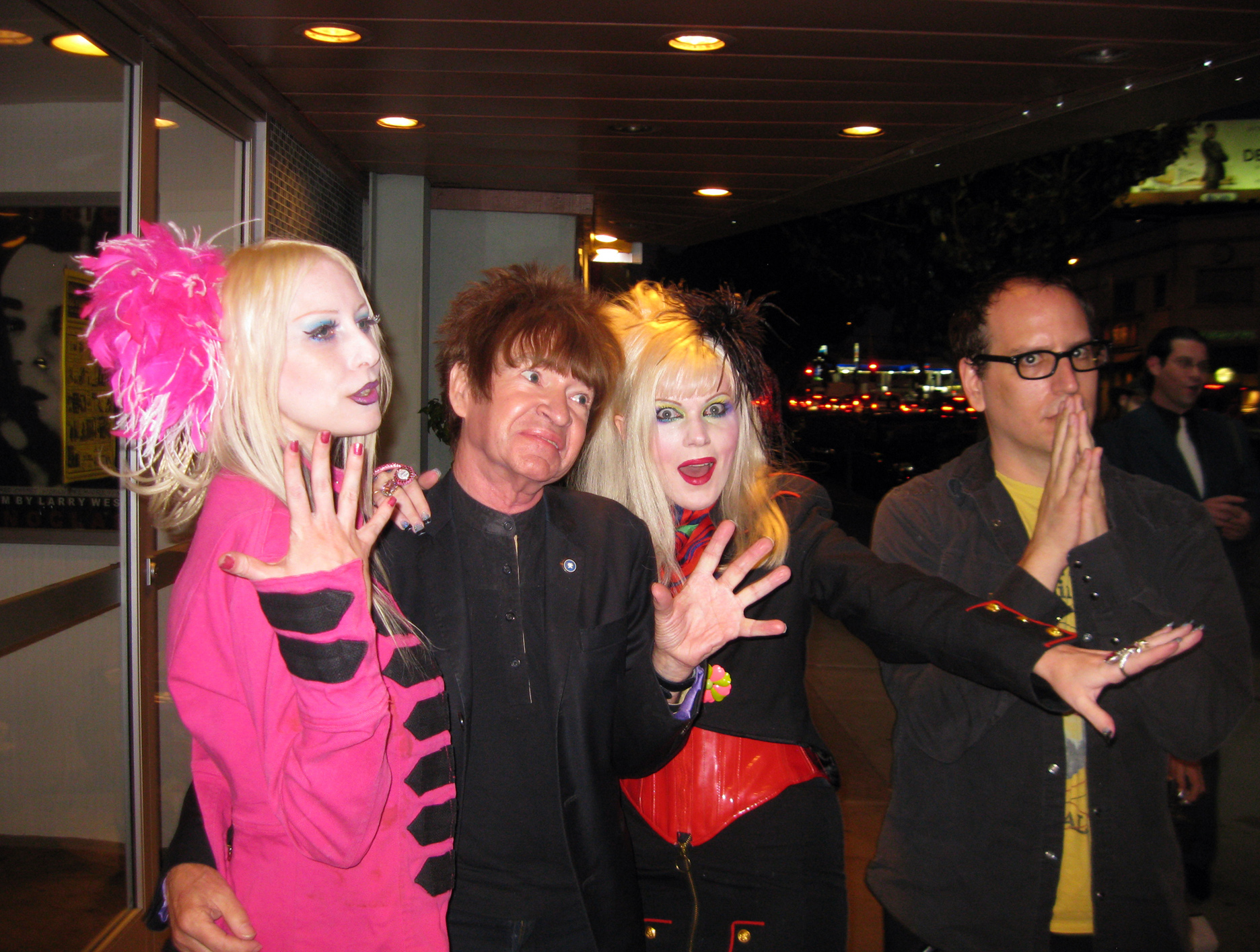
Severa Miles, Bingenheimer, Giddle Partridge and Dan Kapelovitz in 2010

In Mayor of the Sunset Strip, director Hickenlooper examined Bingenheimer's life in a documentary format. According to one account, Bingenheimer was described as "intensely private" and was nervous about the documentary project to film his life; filming took place over a six-year period. According to this report, Bingenheimer found it was sometimes difficult to answer questions about his parents and love life.

The movie suggested that Bingenheimer has had sex with "scores of women" during his earlier days but those relationships did not form into lasting attachments with any particular woman. He has never married but apparently still holds on to the possibility that he will find a woman who has the "ideal 1960s vision in plastic miniskirt, Mary Quant lashes and ropes of bullion fringe."

In one scene in the documentary, Bingenheimer and a younger miniskirted woman named Camille who he introduces on camera to celebrities as his "girlfriend" are being interviewed, and it is only at the end of the scene that it is revealed that she has another boyfriend and does not feel romantic towards Rodney; "by the time the scene is over, you feel devastated for him: his face says, 'I was jilted at the prom'", according to Boston Globe film critic Wesley Morris in 2004.

The movie "is a portrait of a man who has always needed celebrities to validate him", according to David Edelstein in Slate. Bingenheimer has been compared to the character in the Woody Allen film Zelig in which the character keeps appearing in disparate places. He dines regularly at a Hollywood Denny's restaurant, arriving at 1 pm each day, according to one report. Nancy Sinatra dedicated a booth to Bingenheimer at Canter's Deli in the Fairfax District; a plaque commemorating the dedication hangs on the wall above the booth. Bingenheimer owns a "classic blue 1967 Pontiac GTO". He wears "trademark snug black suits".

=== Sexual assault allegations ===
In April 2023, Kari Krome, co-founding member and primary songwriter of the Runaways, filed a civil lawsuit against Bingenheimer and the estate of the now-deceased Kim Fowley, accusing Bingenheimer and Fowley of sexually assaulting her in the 1970s when she was 13. In December, five more women came forward accusing Bingenheimer of sexual assault when they were minors, including Go-Go's guitarist Jane Wiedlin. In January 2026, Krome agreed to a conditional settlement with the estate of the late Fowley while still pursuing her case against Bingenheimer.

== Cultural appearances ==
- Bingenheimer was seen driving the Ramones' pink Cadillac in the film Rock 'n' Roll High School, and provided the hand clapping in "The Return of Jackie and Judy" on the Phil Spector-produced End of the Century. He also appears in the video for their 1986 song "Something to Believe In".
- He appeared as himself in Cheech & Chong's 1978 film Up in Smoke.
- He appeared DJing at KROQ in the documentary X: The Unheard Music about X, the punk band from Los Angeles.
- He was the subject of the documentary film Mayor of the Sunset Strip, directed by George Hickenlooper and produced by Chris Carter.
- After years of grassroots support, the Hollywood Chamber of Commerce decided to acknowledge his contribution to music and radio with a star on the Hollywood Walk of Fame which was presented on March 9, 2007. This is the 2,330th star awarded, and it is in front of the Knitting Factory nightclub at 7021 Hollywood Blvd. When asked about his star, he said "then people can literally walk all over me" but added "from down there I can look up girls' dresses."
- Bingenheimer was portrayed by J. P. Manoux in the Darby Crash biopic What We Do Is Secret.
- Bingenheimer was played by Keir O'Donnell in the 2010 biopic The Runaways.
- Bingenheimer recorded a single titled "I Hate the '90s", and did spoken-word vocals with Sonic Youth's Thurston Moore and Hole's Eric Erlandson, and cut singles with Lita Ford (Lets Make the Scene) and Blondie with the single "Little GTO".
- He appears in Troma Entertainment's B.C. Butcher as himself.
- He appears as himself in the Japanese film, Ghostroads – A Japanese Rock n Roll Ghost Story.
- He appears in the film Nina Hagen = Punk + Glory, released in 2002.
- He appears in the 2018 documentary Bad Reputation about the career of rock musician Joan Jett.
- He appears in the SpongeBob SquarePants episode "Krab Borg" as a radio station DJ.
- He appears in the 1990 film Rockula as a backstage audience member.
- Bingenheimer was portrayed by Thomas Lennon in the 2020 film Valley Girl.

== Bibliography ==
- Hoskyns, Barney; Waiting for the Sun: Strange Days, Weird Scenes and the Sound of Los Angeles (Bloomsbury Books, 2003)
