= Beach bunny =

Beach bunny or beach bunnies may refer to:

- Beach bunny (surf culture), term for a young woman who spends her free time at the beach
- Umina Beach Bunnies, a rugby league club based on the Central Coast, New South Wales, Australia
- Beach Bunny (band), an indie pop band from Chicago

== Film ==
- The Beach Bunnies, 1976 erotic film produced by Stephen C. Apostolof
- Buford's Beach Bunnies, 1993 comedy featuring Jim Hanks

== See also ==
- Beach Bunny Bimbos with Blasters, role-playing game by Tri Tac Games
- Gidget, a fictional character in several films, television series and telemovies
- Buckle bunny, a groupie in the sport of rodeo
- Playboy bunny, a waitress at the Playboy Club
- Puck bunny, a female ice hockey fan
- Snow bunny (disambiguation)
- Beach bum (disambiguation)
