= Snow bunny =

Snow bunny may refer to:

- Snow Bunny, a small snow play area located in Mount Hood National Forest
- A groupie in skiing
- The Snow Bunnies, a 1972 film by Stephen C. Apostolof
- "Snow Bunny", a song on the 2010 album Tomorrow
- "Snow Bunny", a song on the 2017 album World Wide Funk
- "Snow Bunny", a song on the 2022 mixtape Colors

== See also ==
- Beach bunny (disambiguation)
- Puck bunny, a female ice hockey fan
- Arctic hare Lepus arcticus, species of hare adapted to polar and mountainous habitats
- Snowshoe rabbit Lepus americanus, species of hare with large hind feet
- The Abominable Snow Rabbit, 1961 theatrical cartoon starring Bugs Bunny and Daffy Duck
