= Lori Mattix =

Former child model and "baby" groupie of the 1970s

Lori Mattix (born November 29, 1958), sometimes known as Lori Maddox or Lori Lightning, is an American former child model and groupie of the 1970s. As of November 2015, she is a partner and buyer for the Glam Boutique in West Hollywood. She is perhaps best known for an interview with Thrillist in 2015 in which she made allegations of being involved in sexual relationships with Jimmy Page, David Bowie, and Mick Jagger; these are relationships which would have occurred while she was underage, beginning at the age of 13 and while the musicians were in their twenties, although her connections to Bowie and Jagger are disputed.

Her experience has been discussed in the Me Too movement, with her story marking a shift of the movement's focus from the film industry to the music industry.

== Life as a groupie ==
At the age of 13, in 1972, Mattix began frequenting clubs on the Sunset Strip in West Hollywood with her friend Sable Starr, particularly the Rainbow Bar and Grill, the Whisky a Go Go and Rodney Bingenheimer's English Disco.

=== Jimmy Page ===
In June of 1973, the members of Led Zeppelin were in Los Angeles for their 1973 North American tour. While there, the 14-year-old Mattix met 29-year-old guitarist Jimmy Page for the first time at the Hyatt hotel where the band was staying, according to Mattix's 2015 interview with Thrillist. Page approached Mattix and introduced himself by the hotel's pool.

Later that evening, the band's manager, Peter Grant, spotted Mattix and her groupie friends at the Rainbow Bar and Grill. He insisted she come with him. A limo then drove her back to the Hyatt to meet with Page in his room. This was the beginning of her romantic and sexual relationship with Page for two years, despite being 14 at the start. California's age of sexual consent was 18 at the time and still is. Because of this, according to Rolling Stone, Page feared charges of statutory rape and went to great lengths to hide his association with Mattix.

Grant insisted on keeping Mattix in a locked hotel room with a security guard at the door during the band's subsequent U.S. touring. Mattix did not travel with Led Zeppelin while they were on tour, but she claimed Page stationed himself in Los Angeles and would frequently fly back there to see her between concerts in the band's private jet, The Starship. Whenever Page returned to England, Mattix says he called her every day.

Page's sexual relationship with Mattix lasted for more than two years, ending in 1975 when Mattix was 16. Mattix claimed she ended the relationship after finding Page in bed with Bebe Buell. Buell gave an alternate version of these events, claiming that despite the fact that Mattix "had given herself exclusively to Jimmy (Page) from age 14 to 16," she was barred by Page's security from seeing him once he began dating Buell.

Lori Mattix is said by Led Zeppelin biographers to have been referenced by the band in the song "Sick Again", specifically with the lyrics:

One day soon you're gonna reach sixteen
Painted lady in the city of lies

However, Robert Plant has said that he wrote the song in general about the many underage groupies with whom the band were acquainted on their 1973 US Tour.

=== David Bowie ===
Mattix says that when she was nearly 14 years old, she was introduced to David Bowie while he was in Los Angeles on his Ziggy Stardust Tour in October 1972. When Bowie's tour returned to Los Angeles five months later, on the night before Bowie performed at the Long Beach Arena in March 1973, Mattix claimed, Bowie's bodyguard was sent to pick up her and Starr for a sexual encounter. According to Mattix, as she told to Thrillist in 2015, she and Starr met Bowie at the Rainbow Bar before the three went to Bowie's hotel suite and had sex: "... [Bowie] de-virginised me ... That night I lost my virginity and had my first threesome."

However, Starr gave a conflicting account of the same night's events, claiming that she alone had sex with Bowie and that Mattix was no longer with them by the time they were at the hotel. Mattix also gave a different account of her encounter with Bowie to music journalist Paul Trynka, in which she claimed that she and Starr sought out the hotel room Bowie was staying in and snuck inside, uninvited. In this account, Mattix claimed that when they found Bowie he was "tired" but they initiated a sexual encounter with him. Mattix claims she continued to see Bowie "many times" in the 10 years afterwards.

Also according to English author Dylan Jones, Mattix's account is contradicted by fellow groupie Pamela Des Barres' 1987 memoir I'm with the Band: Confessions of a Groupie.

=== Mick Jagger ===
Mattix alleges that she engaged in a physically intimate relationship with Mick Jagger when she was 17.

=== Other celebrities ===
Mattix has also claimed to have had affairs with Jeff Beck, Ronnie Wood, T. Rex's Mickey Finn, Angela Bowie, Keith Emerson, Carl Palmer and Jimmy Bain.

== Cultural impact ==
In 2015, an interview with Mattix was published in which she detailed the alleged relationships between her and Bowie, and later Page. The issue later became a central debate topic across social media, prompting a widespread review of how such stories should be understood in the #MeToo era. The allegations and the larger context of the MeToo movement had some impact on the legacy of Bowie, who died the next year.

When asked whether the Me Too movement had changed her opinion on her groupie years, Mattix admitted that she had not seen her relationships as exploitative at the time, but that the movement had forced her to view these years in a different light during an interview with The Guardian's Thea De Gallier.

I don't think underage girls should sleep with guys ... I wouldn't want this for anybody's daughter. My perspective is changing as I get older and more cynical.

Rebecca Hains, a children's media culture expert, viewed the problem as a symptom of sexism in the music industry, arguing that it is a "sad commentary on our culture that modern masculinity can be so entitled, so toxic, that we are repeatedly put in the position of both loving the art and hating the man behind said art for what he did to women and/or children." Journalist Stereo Williams framed the problem of lax social attention to such crimes as one endemic to the time period – considered unworthy of concern in the 1970s and earlier – but incompatible in a modern era where society has a greater focus on "protecting victims and holding celebrities accountable."
