= Beach bum (disambiguation) =

Beach bum or beach bums may refer to:

- A beach bum or a surf bum
- The Beach Bum, a 2019 American stoner comedy film
- The San Pedro Beach Bums, a 1977 television series
- Traverse City Beach Bums, a professional baseball team based in the Traverse City, Michigan
- Beach bum trust provision, a provision in the law of trusts to prevent a beneficiary from lazily living off the trust funds
- Beach Bum Survey, a study on the prevalence of antibiotic-resistant E. coli in surfers and bodyboarders supported by Surfers Against Sewage

== See also ==
- Beach bunny (disambiguation)
