= Connie Hamzy =

American groupie (1955–2021)

- Connie Hamzy, 1989
- Born: Connie Hamzy; January 9, 1955; Little Rock, Arkansas, U.S.
- Died: August 21, 2021 (aged 66); Little Rock, Arkansas, U.S.
- Occupations: Media personality, groupie

"Sweet" Connie Hamzy (January 9, 1955 – August 21, 2021), also called "Sweet Sweet" Connie or Connie Flowers, was an American woman who was known as a groupie who claimed to have had sex with numerous rock musicians. Hamzy also received attention for her claim that she was propositioned by Bill Clinton, then governor of Arkansas. She is mentioned in the Grand Funk Railroad song "We're an American Band" and published a memoir in 1995.

== Life ==
Hamzy was born to Joetta (1929–2014) and Winfred Hamzy (1920–1984). Hamzy claimed to have given oral sex to various members of the many bands that traveled through Little Rock. Her alleged groupie escapades were detailed in a Cosmopolitan profile in 1974, and in 1992 she wrote a tell-all article for Penthouse. In his autobiography, Paul Shaffer describes a sexual encounter with her in Memphis during a Blues Brothers tour.

She is mentioned in Grand Funk Railroad's song "We're an American Band" ("Last night in Little Rock, put me in a haze / Sweet, sweet Connie, doin' her act / She had the whole show and that's a natural fact.") Hamzy published a memoir in 1995 under the title Rock Groupie: The Intimate Adventures of "Sweet Connie" from Little Rock.

She is also mentioned in The Guess Who song "Pleasin' For Reason" from their 1974 album Road Food as well as in the title track of Cheap Trick's 1985 Standing on the Edge album.

In 1991, Hamzy was briefly in the news because of her claim that in 1984 she had been approached by an Arkansas state trooper on behalf of Bill Clinton. She claimed that she and Clinton had looked for "a place where they could have some privacy for an assignation, but couldn't find one." George Stephanopoulos later recounted that Clinton told him a different story of his meeting with Hamzy. According to Clinton, Hamzy had approached him in a hotel lobby, flipped down her bikini top, and asked him, "What do you think of these?" Stephanopoulos secured affidavits from three people who had been accompanying Clinton and confirmed Clinton's recollection. When asked about Hamzy by reporters, Stephanopoulos responded by denying the story off the record and offering to provide the affidavits, also off the record. CNN Headline News reported Hamzy's allegations once; neither CNN nor other mainstream news organizations pursued the story further.

She was interviewed on the Howard Stern Show on December 4, 1991, and again on December 8, 2010.

In 1996, Hamzy sought to run as an independent for the United States House of Representatives from Arkansas's 2nd congressional district, but ultimately did not appear on the general election ballot.

Hamzy was featured in a segment of the Insomniac with Dave Attell episode in Little Rock.

She died August 21, 2021, in a hospital in her hometown after a short illness.
