= Frankie and the Studs =

American rock band

- Origin: Los Angeles, California, U.S.
- Genres: Punk rock; glam rock; power pop; indie rock
- Years active: 2015–present
- Labels: Dead Beat Records; Independent
- Members: Frankie Clarke – vocals, guitar; Frank Salazar – lead guitar; Lizi Gionangeli – bass; Jonah Bowen Smith – drums
- Website: www.frankieandthestuds.com

Frankie and the Studs is an American rock band from Los Angeles, California, founded by singer and guitarist Frankie Clarke. The band blends elements of punk rock, glam rock, and power pop.

== History ==
Frankie and the Studs was formed in Los Angeles by Frankie Clarke during her final semester at Pitzer College in Claremont, California. Clarke is the daughter of former Guns N' Roses guitarist Gilby Clarke and fashion designer Daniella Clarke (founder of the denim brand Frankie B.). She grew up in the San Fernando Valley and began writing and performing music influenced by punk and glam artists including the Ramones, the Clash, the Sex Pistols, the Runaways, Blondie, and Green Day.

Clarke came up with the band name before the group was formed, inspired by studded leather jackets and the double meaning of the word “studs.” The band’s first recording was a cover of Nick Gilder’s 1978 hit “Hot Child in the City.”

The group released its debut EP, High on Yourself, in 2016, followed by Cheap Talk in 2018. During this period the band performed extensively in the United States and opened concerts for The Longshot (the project led by Green Day frontman Billie Joe Armstrong), the B-52's, The Struts, and Sex Pistols bassist Glen Matlock.

Lead guitarist Frank Salazar joined the band and has remained a core member alongside Clarke. In March 2023, Forever 21 released a collaborative clothing collection with Frankie and the Studs, developed with Clarke and her mother Daniella Clarke.

=== Life's a Glitch ===
The band released its first full-length studio album, Life's a Glitch, on March 27, 2025, through Dead Beat Records. The album was approached with a live-performance mindset, with Clarke stating that the track sequencing was designed to feel like a setlist. Macy Gray is credited as a producer on the track “Some Kinda Love.”

The album includes a cover of “Venus” (originally recorded by Shocking Blue and later popularized by Bananarama). Billie Joe Armstrong contributed harmony vocals to a vinyl single version of the track released in 2026.

In 2026 the band served as direct support on Kelsy Karter & The Heroines’ Pleasure Tour.

== Related projects ==
Clarke and Salazar also perform together in Los Frankies, which released its debut album D.E.D. City in March 2026. The pair have additionally played in the CBGB tribute band The Gormandizers. Drummer Jonah Bowen Smith is the son of photographer Brian Bowen Smith.

== Discography ==
=== Studio albums ===
- Life's a Glitch (2025)

=== EPs ===
- High on Yourself (2016)
- Cheap Talk (2018)

=== Singles ===
- "Bimini" (2024)
- "Venus" (2026) (featuring Billie Joe Armstrong on vinyl release)
- "Get It Right" (2026)
