= Gilby Clarke (album) =

Greatest hits album by Gilby Clarke
- Released: January 30, 2007
- Genre: Rock
- Label: Spitfire Records

Gilby Clarke chronology
Swag (2001)	Gilby Clarke (2007)	The Gospel Truth (2021)

Professional ratings
Review scores
Source	Rating
Allmusic	4/5 stars

Gilby Clarke is a best of album by former Guns N' Roses guitarist Gilby Clarke, released in 2007.

== Track listing ==
All songs by Clarke unless otherwise stated.

1. "Cure Me... Or Kill Me..." – 4:56
2. "Tijuana Jail" – 5:08
3. "Skin & Bones" – 3:17
4. "Alien" – 2:48
5. "I'm Nobody" – 3:00
6. "Judgement Day" – 3:51
7. "Motorcycle Cowboys (Live)" – 4:14
8. "Wasn't Yesterday Great" – 2:45
9. "It's Good Enough for Rock N' Roll" – 3:12
10. "Punk Rock Pollution" – 2:29
11. "Kilroy Was Here" – 2:55
12. "Bourbon Street Blues" (Words by Clarke, music by Clarke/Jo Almeida) – 2:33
13. "Monkey Chow (Live)" – 4:54
14. "Dropping Out" (as Col. Parker)
15. "Can't Get That Stuff" (as Col. Parker)
16. "Black" (re-recorded version featuring Dilana)

== iTunes Track listing ==
1. "Cure Me... Or Kill Me..." – 4:58
2. "Tijuana Jail" – 5:09
3. "Black" (re-recorded version featuring Dilana) - 3:01
4. "Skin & Bones" – 3:19
5. "Wasn't Yesterday Great" – 2:48
6. "It's Good Enough for Rock N' Roll" – 3:14
7. "Punk Rock Pollution" – 2:31
8. "Kilroy Was Here" – 2:57
9. "Bourbon Street Blues" (Words by Clarke, music by Clarke/Jo Almeida) – 2:30
10. "Can't Get That Stuff" (as Col. Parker) - 3:13
11. "Dropping Out" (as Col. Parker) - 3:12
12. "I'm Nobody" – 2:49
13. "Alien" – 3:24
14. "Judgement Day" – 3:44
