= Kyle Vincent =

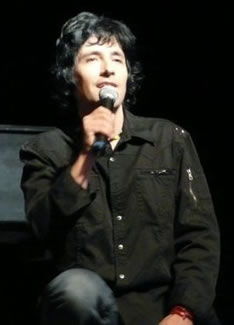

Background information
- Born: Berkeley, CA, U.S.
- Genres: Pop, soft rock, power pop, yacht rock, adult contemporary
- Occupations: Singer-songwriter, musician, arranger, producer
- Instruments: Vocals, piano, guitar, saxophone
- Labels: Universal; Curb/MCA; Mercury/Polygram; Gasoline Alley/MCA; Hollywood; Varèse Sarabande
- Website: www.kylevincent.com

Kyle Vincent is an American singer-songwriter, multi-instrumentalist, and entertainer, labeled as the "crown prince of soft pop," by Goldmine.

Barry Manilow has called him, "One of the best singer-songwriters to come along since the heyday of Tin Pan Alley". In 2014 Vincent won "Best Male Vocalist" at the Hollywood Music in Media Awards.

== Musical career ==
Kyle Vincent began his music career at the age of eight, playing alto saxophone in Berkeley, CA school jazz bands. At age 11 he appeared on stage with Donald Byrd, taking turns improvising with the trumpeter. He took jazz and bebop lessons for several years with saxophonist Hal Stein. Vincent studied voice with master vocal coach and opera singer Claudine Spindt for several years, and took bass lessons from guitarist Joe Satriani. After moving to Los Angeles, Vincent studied with renowned vocal coach Seth Riggs.

Upon moving to L.A., Vincent worked for two years as personal assistant and driver for Kim Fowley. Vincent performed on several of Fowley's recording projects, and was also a session vocalist on several other artists’ albums.

Vincent was the lead singer in the seminal teen power pop band, Candy, which recorded one album, ‘’Whatever Happened To Fun...’’ on the Mercury/Polygram label, and included future Guns N' Roses guitarist Gilby Clarke. The album was produced by Jimmy Ienner (Raspberries, Bay City Rollers, Eric Carmen), and featured Wally Bryson of the Raspberries as "musical director". The video for the title track was in rotation on MTV, and the band toured extensively, including being the opening act on Rick Springfield's and Corey Hart's U.S. tours, and is cited by many groups as an influence.

While recording demos as a solo artist in an L.A. studio, Vincent began co-writing a song entitled "Nature Girl", with eden ahbez, writer of the classic "Nature Boy," popularized by Nat King Cole. Vincent had met Ahbez in an L.A. stereo store where Vincent had been working, and Ahbez told Vincent that he reminded him of his deceased son, about whom he had written "Nature Boy". Ahbez died before the two could finish the song.

Signed to MCA as a solo artist, he recorded the album, Trust, and toured as the opening act for Barry Manilow on his "Greatest Hits and Then Some" tour. Trust was produced by Vincent, Clif Magness (Avril Lavigne, Kelly Clarkson), and Steve Levine (Culture Club, Beach Boys), and featured co-writes with Magness and Steve Kipner. Gerry Beckley from the group America played keyboards, guitar, and sang vocals on the album.

For his next album, Vincent signed with Disney's Hollywood Records releasing Kyle Vincent, which spawned the U.S. Billboard/Radio & Records Adult Top 20 single, "Wake Me Up (When The World's Worth Waking Up For)", co-written by vocalist/guitarist Parthenon Huxley. The song spent eleven weeks on the Billboard Bubbling Under Hot 100 Singles chart, peaking at number one, went Top 10 in many cities, and was featured in the Garry Marshall-directed motion picture, The Other Sister, as well as The Howling: Reborn. Robert Lamm from the band Chicago, and Gerry Beckley sang background vocals on the album and also on his follow-up 1999 release Wow & Flutter, for which Henry Diltz shot the album cover. In 2009, Vincent released the CD, "Where You Are", giving the first copy off the presses to Barry Manilow backstage at Manilow's concert in Manchester, NH. In 2020, Vincent signed with Universal Music Group to distribute the album, Whatever It Takes, and in 2024 his latest album, Sunshine Soul.

His songs have appeared on various television shows including MTV's :The Hills, Road Rules, The Real World, Daria, ABC's All My Children, and Save the Planet: A CBS/Hard Rock Cafe Special.

Vincent's song "Sierra" was adopted by the Sierra Club and John Denver's Windstar Foundation. It was included on the Dear Earth double CD released on Earth Day, 2007.

Also in 2007, Vincent was chosen to be the lead singer of the reformed Bay City Rollers, featuring ex-Roller Ian Mitchell. The band toured the U.S. and had a month-long engagement at the Riviera in Las Vegas. Vincent left the group in November 2008. He has also done several concerts singing lead for Bo Donaldson and the Heywoods, and was the lead vocalist on their 2015 compilation, Absolutely the Best of the 70s.

His song, "Forget You Girl" won "Best Pop Song of the Year" at the 2014 Dallas Songwriters Association Awards.

In 2024 he released Sunshine Soul, featuring the song, "Jimmy & Rosalynn" which celebrates the 77-year relationship of Jimmy Carter and Rosalynn Carter.

Vincent is credited as being a pioneer of the "Living Room Show" concept, in which artists perform concerts in people's homes. Of his house concerts, Vincent has said, "They're kind of like musical Tupperware parties.”

== Other ==
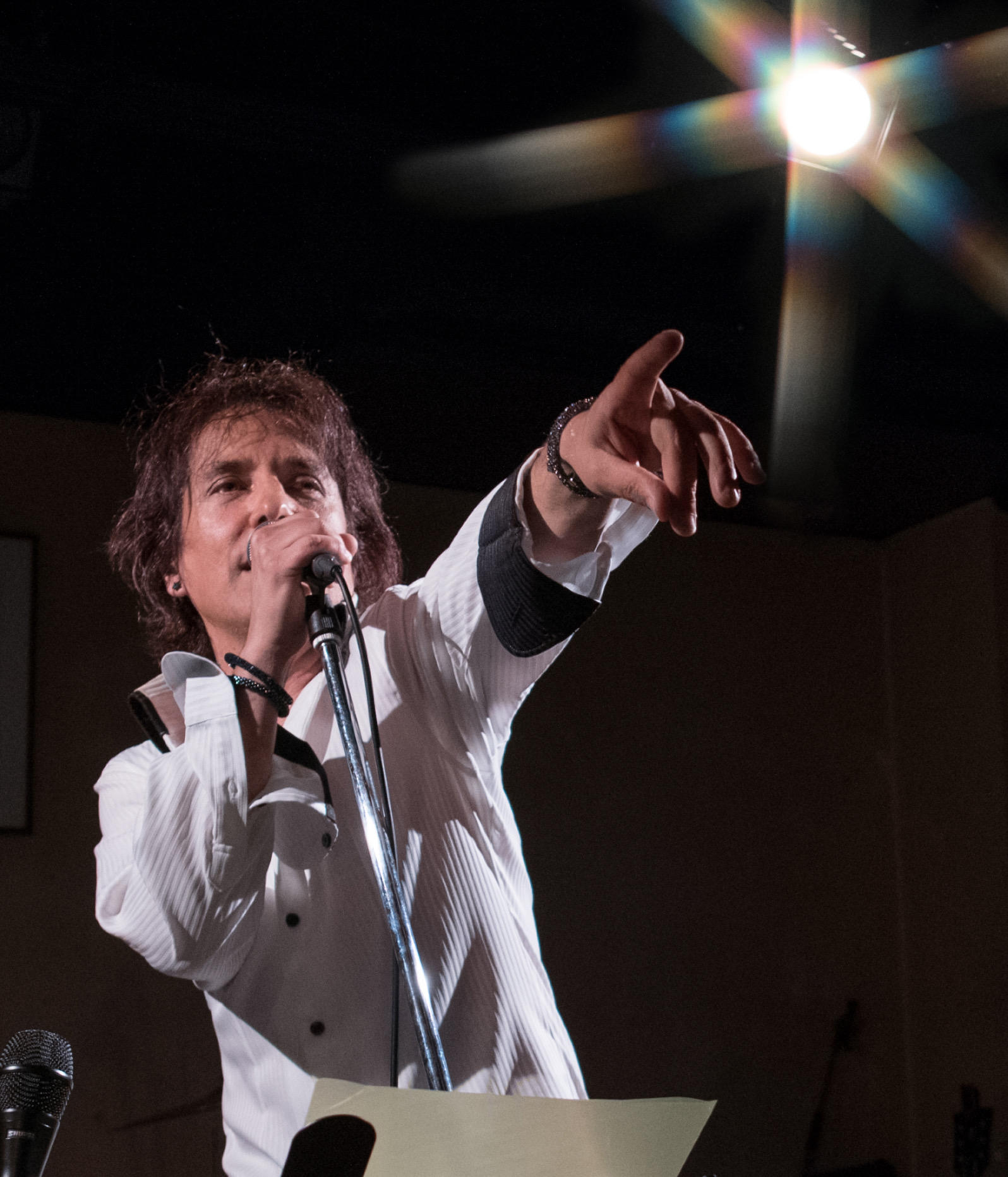
Kyle Vincent concert in Kyoto, Japan (2018)

Vincent is the grandson of renowned California painter Louise Noack Gray, about whom he wrote the song "One Last Ride On The Merry-Go-Round", featured on his Don't You Know album.

Vincent was a participant in the California AIDSRide 2, bicycling 540 miles in seven days from San Francisco to Los Angeles, raising money for AIDS care facilities. Vincent took part in the In Harmony With The Homeless project, in which professional songwriters collaborated with individuals living in shelters on L.A.'s skid row.

In 2007, Vincent was one of a select group of people personally trained by former Vice President Al Gore in Nashville, Tennessee, sponsored by The Alliance for Climate Protection and The Climate Project, and is an officially sanctioned presenter of Gore's climate crisis presentation, as seen in An Inconvenient Truth. Vincent's version includes the impact diet has on the environment.

In 2010, Vincent was a featured performer at a Hiroshima Peace Concert celebrating teachers in Hiroshima, Japan, in commemoration of the 65th anniversary of the bombing.

In 2023, Vincent was one of 42 musical artists to come together as 'Artists for Maui' to contribute songs for the digital album "Embers of Aloha: A Maui Wildfire Benefit Project". All proceeds from the donation/sale of the album provide relief for victims of the 2023 Lahaina and West Maui wildfires.

Vincent is an advocate for a plant-based diet, citing concerns for the environment, world hunger, personal health, and animal welfare. To this end, he was an official celebrity endorser of the California Healthy School Lunch Resolution (ACR-16), which asked schools to offer a plant-based lunch option on the daily menu. The resolution overwhelmingly passed the California Assembly and Senate in 2003.

== Discography ==
- Whatever Happened To Fun... – (1985) (as singer in Candy) Mercury/Polygram (re-released 2012 by RockCandy (UK)
- Trust – (1994) (originally unreleased; eventually released in 2007) MCA
- Kyle Vincent – (1997) Hollywood
- "Wake Me Up (When The World's Worth Waking Up For)"-Single (1997)
- Wow & Flutter (1999) SongTree
- "Tell It Goodbye (An Ode To Candlestick Park, 1960–1999)" -Single b/w "The First Thing On My Mind"- (1999) SongTree
- Sweet 16 (Rare & Unreleased, Vol. I) – (2000) SongTree
- Wow & Flutter (2001) SongTree/Varèse Sarabande/Universal (2 bonus tracks)
- Heroes Among Us – (2001) -Lincoln, Nebraska radio-sponsored collection commemorating 9/11, featuring "5000 Heroes"
- "5000 Heroes" – Single
- Solitary Road – (2002) SongTree
- Solitary Road – (2003) SongTree (change in sequencing, and 1 song dropped, 1 song added)
- "Remember Me" -Single (2003)
- Teenage Neon Jungle – (2003) (as singer in Candy) SongTree
- Don't You Know – (2005) SongTree
- Gathering Dust (Rare & Unreleased, Vol II) – (2006) SongTree
- Invisible Man (released as download only) – (2006) Ume Digital/Universal
- Live (& Unlive Too) DVD – (2007) SongTree
- Sakura Lullaby EP (Japan) – (2008) SongTree
- Where You Are – (2009) SongTree
- A Sakura Christmas EP (Japan) – (2009) SongTree
- Dirty Girl Single (Huxley & Vincent) – (2010) SongTree
- Petals of Peace 2-song CD Single (Japan) – (2010) SongTree
- C-Sides (Rare & Unreleased, Vol. 3) – (2011) SongTree
- The Best...So Far – (2011) SongTree
- Kyle Vincent Sings The Super 70s! – (2014) SongTree (Philippines Tour Exclusive)
- Detour – (2015) SongTree
- Absolutely the Best of the 70s (Bo Donaldson & The Heywoods Featuring Kyle Vincent) – (2015)
- "Narita (Tokyo Girl) b/w Whatever Happened To Fun" 45 rpm vinyl 7" -Single (2016)
- Kyle Vincent Sings The Great Manilow Songbook – (2016) SongTree
- Miles & An Ocean – (2018) MotMot (Elec Records in Japan)
- Whatever It Takes – (2020) SongTree (Universal Music Group)(re-released in 2021 with bonus tracks)
- Artists for Maui - Embers of Aloha: A Maui Wildfire Benefit Project "Everything I Want The World To Be" – (2023) Digital download only
- Sunshine Soul – (2024) SongTree (Universal Music Group)

== Charts ==
=== Singles ===
Year	Title	U.S. Billboard Hot 100	U.S. Billboard Bubbling Under	U.S. Billboard AC	U.S. Billboard HOT AC (Adult Top 40)	U.S. Radio & Records AC	U.S. Cashbox AC	Album
1997	""Wake Me Up (When The World's Worth Waking Up For""	101	1	20	26	18	19	Kyle Vincent

== Awards and nominations ==
Year	Award	Category	Nominee(s)	Result
2014	Hollywood Music in Media Awards	Best Male Vocal	Kyle Vincent	Won

Some of the artists Vincent has appeared or recorded with include:

- 10,000 Maniacs
- Bryan Adams
- Bay City Rollers
- eden ahbez
- Gerry Beckley
- Donald Byrd
- The Cowsills
- Gary Lewis
- Barry Manilow
- Stephen Bishop
- Ron Dante
- Bo Donaldson and The Heywoods
- Julia Fordham
- Kim Fowley
- Kevin Gilbert
- Amy Grant
- The Grass Roots
- Corey Hart
- Jimmy Ienner
- Steve Kipner
- Robert Lamm
- Steve Levine
- Barry Manilow
- Ziggy Marley
- Richard Marx
- John JR Robinson
- The Rubinoos
- Run DMC
- Sister Hazel
- Martin Sexton
- Rick Springfield
- Hal Stein
- Matthew Sweet
- The Ventures
- Rufus Wainright
- Freddie Washington
- Walter Egan
- Dennis Tufano
- Jimi Jamison
