= Swag (Gilby Clarke album) =

Studio album by Gilby Clarke
- Released: 2001
- Genre: Rock
- Length: 37:55
- Label: Spitfire
- Producer: Gilby Clarke

Gilby Clarke chronology
99 Live (1999)	Swag (2001)	Gilby Clarke (2007)

Professional ratings
Review scores
Source	Rating
Allmusic	link

Swag is the fourth solo album by former Guns N' Roses guitarist Gilby Clarke, released in 2001. It would be his last studio album until his 2021 album The Gospel Truth.

== Track listing ==
All music is composed by Gilby Clarke, except where noted.

No.	Title	Writer(s)	Length
1.	"Alien"		3:24
2.	"Under The Gun"		2:43
3.	"Crocodile Tears"		4:02
4.	"Broken Down Car"		2:49
5.	"Margarita"		3:01
6.	"I'm Nobody"		2:51
7.	"Judgement Day"		3:52
8.	"Beware of the Dog"		3:30
9.	"Heart of Chrome"		3:50
10.	"Warm Country Sun"		3:04
11.	"Diamond Dogs"	David Bowie	4:54

== Personnel ==
- Gilby Clarke - guitar, vocals
- Johnny Griparic, Stefan Adika - bass
- Brian Tichy - drums
- Kyle Vincent, Tim Karr - backing vocals

with:

- Tracii Guns - lead guitar on "Alien" and "Under the Gun"
- Derek Sherinian - synthesizer on "Alien"
- Teddy Andreadis - harmonica on "Broken Down Car" and "Warm Country Sun"
- David Raven - drums on "Margarita"
- Clem Burke - drums on "I'm Nobody" and "Judgement Day"
- Eric Singer - drums on "Heart of Chrome" and "Diamond Dogs"
- Brent Fitz - drums on "Warm Country Sun"
- Michael Lohr - front cover photography
