= Sable Starr =

American child groupie of the 1970s

- Starr at Rodney Bingenheimer's English Disco, 1973
- Born: Sabel Hay Shields; August 15, 1957; Florida, U.S.
- Died: April 18, 2009 (aged 51); Gardnerville, Nevada, U.S.
- Known for: Rock and roll groupie
- Children: 2

Sabel Hay Shields (August 15, 1957 – April 18, 2009), better known as Sable Starr, was an American child groupie, often described as the "queen of the groupie scene" in Los Angeles during the early 1970s. She claimed during an interview published in the June 1973 edition of Star magazine that she had met Rod Stewart, Led Zeppelin, Alice Cooper, David Bowie, Mick Jagger, Elton John, and Marc Bolan.

== Life as a groupie ==
Starr first attended concerts around Los Angeles in late 1968 at the age of 11, together with older friends who had dropped out of school. She claimed to have lost her virginity when she was 12 to Spirit guitarist Randy California after a gig at Topanga, California. Iggy Pop claimed to have slept with her when she was 13, as reflected in his song "Look Away". Starr also claimed to have had relationships with David Bowie, Robert Plant, Jimmy Page, and Johnny Thunders.

Starr became one of the first "baby groupies" who in the early 1970s frequented the Rainbow Bar and Grill, the Whisky a Go Go, and Rodney Bingenheimer's English Disco; these were trendy nightclubs on West Hollywood's Sunset Strip. The girls were named as such because of their young age. She got started after a friend invited her to the Whisky a Go Go at the age of 14. Starr later described herself at that period as having been "nuts to begin with. I always liked getting into trouble". She had considered herself unattractive, so she had a nose job when she was 15. During the time Starr was a groupie, she continued to live at home with her family and attended Palos Verdes High School to placate her parents.

In 1973, Starr gave a candid interview for the short-lived Los Angeles-based Star magazine, and boasted to the journalist that she considered herself to be "the best" of all the local groupies. She also claimed that she was closely acquainted with some of rock music's leading musicians, such as David Bowie, Rod Stewart, and Alice Cooper. When asked how she attracted the attention of the musicians, Starr maintained it was because of the outrageous glam rock clothing she habitually wore. She was often photographed alongside well-known rock musicians; these photos appeared in American rock magazines such as Creem and Rock Scene.

Starr admitted to having been involved in fights with rival groupies. Lori Mattix, a fellow baby groupie, claimed that Starr once told her to "keep her hands" off Jimmy Page, saying "if you touch him, I will shoot you. He's mine". Her closest friends in Los Angeles were fellow groupies Shray Mecham and "Queenie". Model Bebe Buell described Starr as having been one of the two top Los Angeles groupies of the era, adding that "every rock star who came to Los Angeles wanted to meet her".

Starr ran away from home when she was 16 after meeting Johnny Thunders, guitarist in the glam rock band the New York Dolls. She went to live with him in New York City. Their relationship did not last, mainly due to his violent jealousy and drug addiction. He had wanted to marry her after she became pregnant with their child, but she refused and instead had an abortion. Tired of the physical abuse Thunders often inflicted upon her, and unable to adjust to life in New York, Starr moved back to Los Angeles. She claimed that "he [Thunders] tried to destroy my personality. After I was with him, I just wasn't Sable Starr anymore. He really destroyed the Sable Starr thing". Starr made frequent visits to New York, where she had an affair with Richard Hell and participated in the local burgeoning punk rock scene. By the early 1980s, she was no longer part of the groupie milieu.

== Later years and death ==
She became a table game dealer at Carson Valley Inn in Minden, Nevada shortly before her death.

Starr died at her home in Nevada on April 18, 2009, of brain cancer at the age of 51.
