= Barbara Cope =

American rock and roll groupie (1950–2018)

- Born: Barbara Sheltman; March 19, 1950; Hunt County, Texas, U.S.
- Died: January 14, 2018 (age 67); Dallas, Texas
- Occupation: Rock and roll groupie

Barbara Cope (née Sheltman; March 19, 1950 – January 14, 2018) was an American rock and roll groupie, known in the late 1960s and early 1970s as "The Butter Queen".

== Early life ==
Barbara Sheltman was the daughter of Earline Miller and Joe Sheltman. She was born in Hunt County, Texas, on March 19, 1950, and attended Bryan Adams High School in East Dallas.

== Groupie life ==
She said that she became a groupie in 1965 during a concert at the Dallas Memorial Auditorium. She toured with Traffic and Jimi Hendrix before joining up with Joe Cocker in 1970. She is featured in a seven-minute segment of the 1971 Cocker documentary film Mad Dogs & Englishmen.

She was known by the nickname "The Butter Queen" (or "The Dallas Butter Queen"), which she allegedly earned from using Land O'Lakes butter during sexual encounters with rock stars. She is referenced in the song "Rip This Joint" by The Rolling Stones:

Down to New Orleans with the Dixie Dean
'Cross to Dallas, Texas with the Butter Queen

She is also mentioned in the notes for the DVD release of The Rolling Stones documentary Gimme Shelter:

“A blonde with straggly hair announced, 'I've got a pound of butter in my purse. Where's Mick?' She was the Dallas Butter Queen. Groupies had titles then.”

David Cassidy was quoted as saying "I’d rather spend an evening with her than in the living room of The Partridge Family." In his autobiography, Cassidy wrote that his band and crew "just gasped when they heard that Barbara the Butter Queen was actually coming to do them all."

Elton John said he "got along with her famously." Led Zeppelin singer Robert Plant dedicated the song "Dazed & Confused" to her on stage in 1973, and a number of the band's bootleg tracks are named after her. The first track on the first album by British group Three Man Army features lyrics about her and is entitled "Butter Queen".

Cope said she visited 52 major cities in the United States while following bands, and traveled to 11 different countries with them. She "retired" from groupie life in 1972. She apparently had a collection of Jimi Hendrix autographed material that she sold to help make ends meet in later years.

In 1987, she appeared on The Oprah Winfrey Show and discussed her time as a groupie. She told Winfrey that she had had sex with about 2,000 musicians.

== Marriage ==
She married David Cope on May 23, 1968, in Dallas, and had one son, born in 1968.

== Death ==
Barbara Cope died in a fire at her mother's home in East Dallas on the morning of January 14, 2018. She was 67 and was survived by a son. Her 93-year-old mother Earline Collins was injured in the blaze and died on August 24, 2018.
