= Chicklet =

Canadian indie rock group

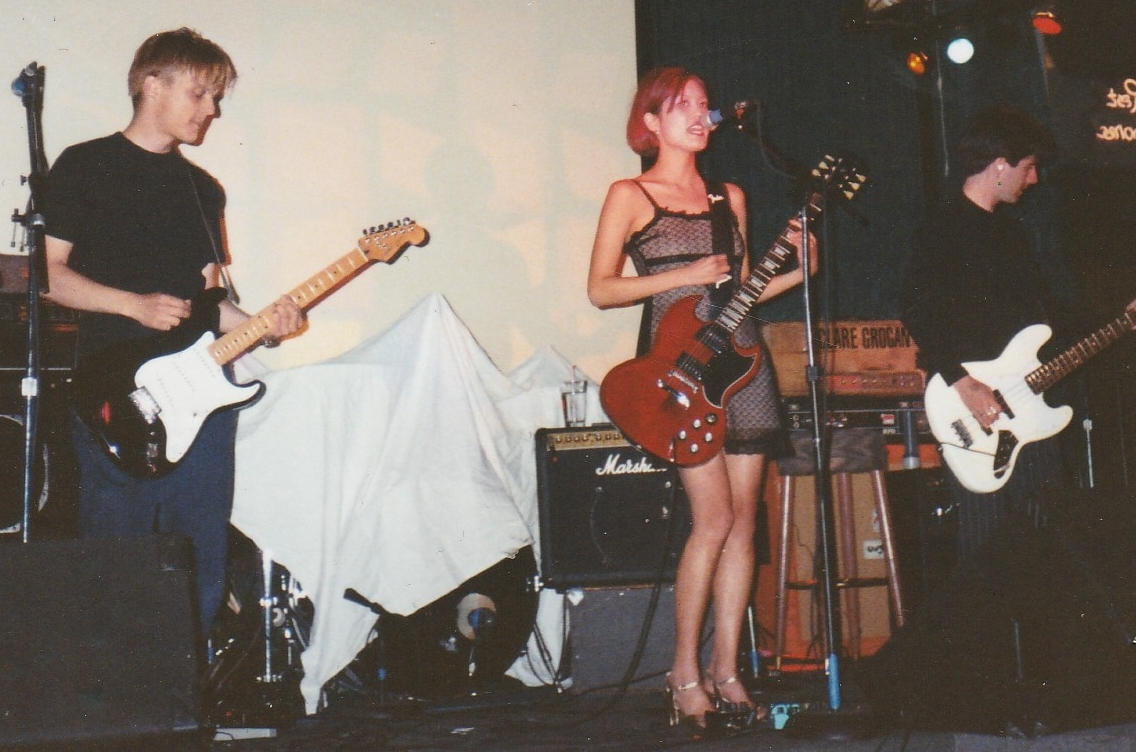
- Chicklet: Julie Park, Daniel Barida

Background information
- Origin: Toronto, Ontario, Canada
- Genres: Indie rock, dream pop, pop rock, shoegazing
- Years active: 1995–present
- Labels: Satellite Records
- Members: Daniel Barida; Julie Park
- Website: http://www.satelliterecords.net/releases1.html

Chicklet is a Canadian musical group consisting of Julie Park (vocals, guitar) and Daniel Barida (guitar, vocals, synth). Sean Bettam (bass) was part of the group from 1997 to 1999 and toured the US to support their first album Wanderlust. Chris Sytnyk (bass) recorded on several Chicklet releases including Lemon Chandeliers, Wanderlust and Indian Summer.

== History ==
Chicklet started as a side project from the other musical projects Park and Barida were involved with prior to 1995. They recorded, produced and independently released Daisy Smile and Kitty in 1995 and played live shows throughout Toronto. In 1996, Chicklet were invited to Livonia, Michigan to record the song Shellac, which was recorded and produced by legendary 4AD musician/producer Warren Defever of His Name is Alive. The song attracted the attention of California's Dewdrop Records and was included on the 1997 compilation Splashed with Many a Speck.

Later that year, Chicklet signed with California's Satellite Records which released the three-song recording, Premiere. It was released on semi-transparent purple 7" vinyl, and introduced the band to a larger audience while attracting positive reviews from press in both the US and Europe.

In 1997, Chicklet recorded an EP titled Lemon Chandeliers at Toronto's Audiolab Studio with Chris Hegge. Chris Sytnyk recorded bass while Barida played drums and percussion on all the tracks. Park and Barida followed up with a full-length album titled Wanderlust in 1998, which was also recorded at Audiolab.

Chicklet continued touring across the US to support Wanderlust. Sean Bettam played bass while the band performed with pre-recorded drums on stage. While on tour, Chicklet was interviewed on KROQ-FM in Los Angeles where Rodney Bingenheimer invited the band on his live radio show 'Rodney on the Roq'. Later, Johnny Marr (ex-The Smiths) and Rodney introduced the band while performed at Cafe Bleu in Hollywood California. Chicklet charted on the Billboard college radio charts with the album Wanderlust.

Their second full-length album Indian Summer was released in 2003 which was recorded and self-produced in their home studio and mastered by Chris Perry. Sytnyk once again recorded the bass lines as Bettam left Chicklet to start the band Talledega. Chicklet supported the album by touring the eastern US States.

Chicklet promised a new release for 2009, but nothing materialized. In 2017, the band reunited for Canadian Music Week 2017.

Now voted Chicklet as the "hottest obscure indie band in Toronto". The obscurity in their hometown is due to Chicklet's conscious effort to focus on a broader audience. The fan base tends to be out of Canada.

The songs, "Kyopo" and "Sleep Talking" were used in the Canadian television show FashionTelevision.

== Discography ==
=== Albums ===
- Wanderlust (1998)
- Indian Summer (2001)

=== EPs and singles ===
- Daisy Smile & Kitty (cassette) (1995)
- Premiere (7" purple vinyl) (1996)
- Lemon Chandeliers (5 song ep) (1997)
- "Ordinary" (single) (2010)

== Videography ==
- "Sugar Rush" (1996)
- "Sleep Talking" (1998)
- "Frown" (1999)

== Television and film ==
- FashionTelevision
- Music Now
- Mitch (film)
- The Recycler (film)

== See also ==
- Canadian rock
- List of bands from Canada
- List of Canadian musicians
- Category:Canadian musical groups
