= Rodney Bingenheimer's English Disco =

Former nightclub in Los Angeles, US

Coordinates: 34.0980527°N 118.3566362°W

- Interactive map of Rodney Bingenheimer's English Disco
- Address: 7561 W. Sunset Boulevard (October 1972 – December 1975); 7561 Sunset Boulevard; Los Angeles, California; United States
- Type: Nightclub

Construction
- Opened: 1972
- Closed: 1975

Rodney Bingenheimer's English Disco was a Los Angeles nightclub located at 7561 Sunset Boulevard on the Sunset Strip from late 1972 until early 1975. It usually catered to the glam rock movement. The club was infamous for widespread drug use and hosting underage girls at parties, but it was also a popular spot among rock stars, including Cherie Currie, Joan Jett, and Iggy Pop.

== Early background ==
In late 1971, music industry publicist Rodney Bingenheimer moved to London after becoming fed up with the American music industry. While in England he saw the birth of the glam rock movement and David Bowie suggested Bingenheimer open a glam club in Los Angeles. In October 1972, Bingenheimer and his record producer partner Tom Ayres opened the E Club at 8171 Sunset Boulevard, which is next to the Chateau Marmont, at the start of the Sunset Strip. In late December, they moved the club away from the strip to 7561 Sunset Boulevard with the new name, Rodney Bingenheimer's English Disco. Kim Fowley later recalled, "The English Disco was more a public-toilet version of the E Club. The new location gave it the teenage stench it needed. Everybody had great hair and great make-up, and there were Lolita girls everywhere. People worked at it." It soon became the center of the new glitter rock movement in Los Angeles. Bowie biographers Henry Edwards and Tony Zanetta noted, "The crowd at the club ranged in age from twelve to fifteen... nymphet groupies were stars in their tight little world. Some dressed like Shirley Temple; others wore dominatrix outfits or 'Hollywood underwear,' a knee-length shirt, nylon stockings, and garter belts. These stargirls streaked their hair chartreuse and like to lift their skirts to display their bare crotches. As they danced they mimed fellatio and cunnilingus in tribute to David's onstage act of fellatio on Ronno's guitar."

Watney's Red Barrel beer imported from England was served on tap at the club, but the underage groupies' favorite drink there was cherry cola. Sometimes the house DJ Chuck E Starr would perform a striptease down to a gold or silver lamé bikini.

== Peak ==
In November 1973 writer Richard Cromelin reported, "Once inside, everybody's a star. The social rules are simple but rigid: All you want to hear is how fabulous you look, so you tell them how fabulous they look. You talk about how bored you are, coming here night after night, but that there's no place else to go. If you're not jaded there's something wrong. It's good to come in very messed up on some kind of pills every once in a while, and weekend nights usually see at least one elaborate, tearful fight or breakdown. If you're 18 you're over the hill.

Led Zeppelin regularly frequented Rodney Bingenheimer's English Disco. NME writer Mick Farren observed, "They were number one on the groupie target roster, and Rodney Bingenheimer would be pandering to them as they sat in the back of his cupboard-sized discotheque getting their dicks sucked by thirteen-year-olds under the table."

In 1987 Pamela Des Barres wrote, "...they called me awful names at Rodney Bingenheimer's English Disco, old being the most popular odious declaration of loathing. I let them get to me; they told me I was over the hill, and I looked in the mirror, inspecting my twenty-five-year-old face for early stages of decrepitness. The most hideous of these tartlets was Sable Starr. She thought she invented nipples and pubic hair."

Newsweek magazine reported in January 1974 that "The dance floor is a dizzy kaleidoscope of lamè hotpants, sequined halters, rhinestone-studded cheeks, thrift-store anythings and see-through everythings. During the breaks, 14-year-old girls on 6-inch platforms teeter into the back bathrooms to grope with their partners of the moment. Most of the sex is as mixed as the drinks and the drugs the kids bring with them. Twenty years later, author Pleasant Gehman recalled, "I was in the age group of people who were sophisticated enough to be experimenting with drugs and sex, but way below the age to legally be participating in any of this debauchery. Not only that, it being the Swingin' '70s and all, our very sexuality was one big, fat gray area. Most of us couldn't decide if we were gay, straight, or bi – and nobody was really keeping tabs, either. Our adventurous spirit actually fit in with the prevalent freewheeling attitude of the time, and mixed with the handfuls of pills we were taking, as well as the Olde English 800s we guzzled in back alleys, it made sexual classifications totally irrelevant. A Newsweek reporter wrote, "Young men who dress like transvestites but almost invariably maintain that they are straight. 'I may dress flash, but I'm no faggot,' sniffs 18-year-old Kenny (Doll) Malloy, sporting a Lurex halter and tight satin pants. 'I do, however, think you're simply stunning,' he added to Newsweek's Peter S. Greenberg. Adds Chuck Starr, a 17-year-old prep-school student: 'I'm the No. 1 male groupie in the United States. Last year I had a thing with Mick Jagger. But it wasn't a physical thing—it was all mental. Me and Mick just lay there and talked all night. 'I'm not gay or bisexual. I'm just glamorous.'" Cromelin also noted at the time, "There are two distinct modes operating at Rodney’s. The more obvious is the extreme narcissism. The kids dress up so painstakingly not to be admired by their friends, but so they may admire themselves. Even if they ostensibly have a partner on the dance floor, each glistening form is alone, drinking in his or her own image that fades to faceted infinity in the three mirrored walls that surround the floor, fading like the British single whose last distant note will be instantly overwhelmed by the opening bass of the next song before silence is allowed to. At this first level there's no interest in hustling or in picking up, but there's plenty of that coexisting. After all, this is Hollywood, where self-furtherance permeates the air like the smog". The house band were Zolar X, who claimed to be alien and sang in their own language.

In 1989, former Runaways lead singer Cherie Currie wrote of her experiences at the club, "Marie likes Bowie, but she doesn't go all out-not as much as I do. I'm dressed up as wild as can be—I've practiced at Rodney's. I am a glitter queen: satin pants, silver five-inch-high space boots, a glitter T-shirt, and make-up so bright it looks like I'm radioactive – When I'm done I admire myself in the cracked bathroom mirror. I look like an alien princess from a faraway planet. For a while-for tonight – I am no longer Cherie Currie, the sweet little Valley Girl. I am the Cherie-thing; something weird and something wild. Iggy Pop, who had become a forlorn figure in the glam world, was often seen at the club. Kid Congo Powers, later guitarist with the Cramps and Gun Club, remembered "Iggy on the street outside the Disco, pulling his dress up and exposing himself, and Rodney crying because he thought he was going to be arrested." Writer Nick Kent also recalled, "I saw Iggy there many a time, stoned out of his gourd, lost to the world and to himself as well, staring at his face and form in those mirrored walls – staring at his reflection like Narcissus drugged out in teenage-disco-hell. The club had its dark side, however. In 1999 writer Lisa Fancher wrote how Joan Jett "was walking up to Rodney's one Friday night when she saw a dead body out front, an obvious OD, and nobody was paying any attention at all. The kids just kept walking into the club. Sweet was flooding out the door and everybody just kept on dancing..."

== Decline ==
By the fall of 1974, glitter rock was waning in popularity. In October a "Death of Glitter" night was held at the Hollywood Palladium, with performances by the New York Dolls, Iggy Pop and Silverhead. Rodney's deejay Chuck E Star recalled, "All over Hollywood that night it was glitter! Glitter! The line to get into the Palladium was incredible-everyone in LA knew it was their last chance to wear platform shoes and eyeshadow. This was it! Surfers from Malibu were there in midriff shirts, silver space boots, and blue eye makeup, hugging their girlfriends as they waited to get in." The New York Dolls ended the show as Chuck E Starr was carried onto the stage in a glitter coffin, into which the crowd threw roses, glitter and lipstick. Nick Kent wrote, "If it wasn’t quite The Beautiful and the Damned it was certainly the pretty and the damned – everyone was, you know, 'going to hell' and nobody cared. It was as if they'd all taken up residence in Leiber and Stoller’s 'Is That All There Is?' To me, that was the song of the seventies, even if it was written in 1969. Remembering the end of the LA glitter groupie scene Pamela Des Barres wrote, "You couldn’t trust the new LA groupies, who were desperate, discouraged, groveling ego seekers. The love of music had become secondary to preening in Star magazine, standing next to Anybody In A Band. It was scary out there. It was fictitious and haunted." Her feelings were shared by Bebe Buell, who recalled, "There were also a large number of strange-looking young girls dressed up like Christmas ornaments rushing around, or just camping around in front of some rock star’s (hotel) rooms with their coolers and radios. This was a new breed of groupie. They were about fourteen (sometimes twelve) and were aggressive. They were harsh on other females attached to their heroes. You could easily get tripped, kicked, smacked, or have your hair pulled."

Partnership and licensing problems led Rodney Bingenheimer's English Disco to close in early 1975. Pleasant Gehman later wrote, "We were a crowd of groupies, teenage hustlers, bisexual schoolgirls, and fringy, juvenile sluts looking for a good time. We’d hang out at weird coffeeshops (like Arthur J’s, the Gold Cup, and Danielle’s, where drag-queen hookers would meet their tricks in the bathroom), or we’d go to Westwood to see the Rocky Horror Picture Show for the millionth time. These places didn’t serve alcohol, so of course they didn’t card you. And you could feel totally at home in your fishnets, heavy makeup, and divinely decadent attitude. I mean, who was going to hassle you over your hair color? A drag queen? Rodney’s English Disco had closed down, and The Masque wasn’t yet open so these were our haunts." Gehman further hinted at how the underground was splintering in 1975, with roughly half of the former glitter babies turning punk and wearing garbage bags at The Masque, the other half wearing designer jeans and getting swept up into the craze that became disco.
