= Electric Angels =

American rock band

- Origin: Los Angeles, California, U.S.
- Genres: Hard rock, glam metal
- Years active: 1989–1992
- Past members: Ryan Roxie; Jonathan Daniel; John Schubert; Shane (Thomas Riggins)

Electric Angels was an American hard rock/glam metal band from Los Angeles that formed from the defunct pop group Candy featuring new singer Shane (Tommy Riggins/Shane Mansfield), guitarist Ryan Roxie (Ryan Rosowicz), and original Candy members bassist/songwriter Jonathan Daniel, and drummer John Schubert. The name Electric Angels was taken from an early Candy demo. After one year, the band relocated to New York City and were signed to Atlantic Records within five months. One of their first New York shows was opening up for the British band Dogs D'Amour and Mother Love Bone.

The band was originally managed by guitarist Bruce Kulick of Kiss fame, who also produced a demo for the band. One of the band's early unreleased demos, "Put the 'EX' in Sex" had its title recycled for a later Kiss song. Jon Bon Jovi was a fan of the band. Bon Jovi's song, "Bed of Roses" borrowed lyrics from the Angel's "True Love and Other Fairy Tales" which included the lyrics, "...our bed of roses has become a bed of nails". A blond backstage at an Angels show at Club Bene in Sayerville, New Jersey said to Bon Jovi, "Oh my god, you look just like Jon Bon Jovi." Bon Jovi contributed an endorsement statement to the promotional tape for Atlantic Record's, "Electric Angels."

Their self-titled debut was recorded in London in the autumn of 1989 by record producer Tony Visconti, and released in February 1990. They were reviewed favorably as a cross between The Replacements and Hanoi Rocks. "The Drinking Song" from the debut album had a long run as New Jersey's WSOU's (Seton Hall college) third most played song. The first single from their album, "Rattlesnake Kisses", featured actress Christina Applegate in the video.

The band cited their musical influences including Kiss, The Ramones, The Replacements, Rick Springfield and George Jones and toured with New Jersey rockers Danger Danger, former Kiss guitarist Ace Frehley and Phoenix rockers Icon. Amongst the Angel's biggest fans are the Tattooed Angels, known for their lovely dispositions as well as sporting Electric Angels purple, red and black Coat of Arms tattoos.

Home demos were made for early song ideas, though a second album was only in the infancy stages. These demos have erroneously turned up as the never-released second album, which was to be called New York Times, though against the band's wishes or approval. The band let their contract with Atlantic expire in 1991 due to poor promotion on the part of the label and the album was shelved.

The second Electric Angels album was finally released in early 2017, on the Demon Doll label as a "Limited Addiction" release called Lost in the Atlantic, a play on the name of their former record company. Notably left off was "Where The Wild Things Are", a live favorite from the time, and the ballad "Can`t Stand Loving You".

The band broke up in April 1992 when Roxie returned to Los Angeles to become the guitarist on Gilby Clarke´s solo albums, Slash's Snakepit, and in 1996 for Alice Cooper. Roxie later moved to Stockholm, Sweden. Shane, Daniel, and Schubert returned a few years later, sans guitarist Roxie, who was replaced by Richard Tressan and with the addition of John Ceparano, as The Loveless, self-releasing A Tale Of Gin And Salvation in 1995. Later Shane released a solo record called "Blue Movie".

Another Daniel project was the Bellaires, who carried the badge, "Three men, three chords, three songs". The three song set consisted of two Daniels tunes and a Ceparano tune. The tunes were "My Tattooed Angel (from punk rock heaven)", "Movin' On" (Ceparano) and "Stupid Mother****er". The later song title and lyric was changed to "Stupid Futhermucker" for demo purposes. Contrary to what is mentioned on various web sites, John "the Hawk" Schubert was not the drummer of the Bellaires.

The Electric Angels, again without Roxie, but now with A-ZEY JR, reunited in early 2000 for a one-off radio program appearance on WDHA's The Tour Bus.

== Discography ==
As Electric Angels:

- Electric Angels (1990)
- New York Times (Unreleased, 1992)
- Home Sweet Democide (Unofficial, 2001)
- Lost in the Atlantic (2017)

== Singles ==
- "Rattlesnake Kisses" (1990)
