= Rubber (Gilby Clarke album) =

Studio album by Gilby Clarke
- Released: 1998
- Recorded: ??
- Genre: Rock
- Length: 36:07
- Label: Pavement Music
- Producer: Gilby Clarke

Gilby Clarke chronology
The Hangover (1997)	Rubber (1998)	99 Live (1999)

Professional ratings
Review scores
Source	Rating
Allmusic	link

Rubber is the third solo album by former Guns N' Roses guitarist Gilby Clarke, released in 1998.

== Track listing ==
All music and lyrics are written by Gilby Clarke, except where noted

1. "Kilroy Was Here" – 2:55
2. "The Haunting" – 2:57
3. "Something's Wrong With You" – 3:38
4. "Sorry I Can't Write A Song About You" – (Words by Clarke, Jonathan Daniel) – 3:38
5. "Mercedes Benz" (Janis Joplin, Michael McClure, Bobby Neuwirth) – 3:41
6. "The Hell's Angels" – 2:41
7. "Saturday Disaster" (Words by Clarke, Daniel) – 2:59
8. "Trash" (Sylvain Sylvain, David Johansen) – 2:48
9. "Technicolour Stars" – 3:17
10. "Superstar" – 1:48
11. "Bourbon Street Blues" (Music by Clarke, Jo Almeida) – 2:33
12. "Frankie's Planet" – 3:04

== Personnel ==
- Gilby Clarke – vocals, guitars, bass (tracks 4, 6), dobro (track 11), producer, engineering, mixing
- Bobby Schneck – guitars (track 5)
- Michael Brooks – guitars, vocals (track 8)
- Keith Jackson – guitars, vocals (track 8)
- Ryan Roxie – guitars (tracks 9, 12)
- James LoMenzo – bass (tracks 1, 2), art direction
- Will Effertz – bass (tracks 3, 9, 12), background vocals (track 6)
- Phil Soussan – bass (tracks 5, 7, 10)
- Eric Stevens - bass (track 8)
- Johnny Griparic – bass (track 11)
- Teddy Andreadis – Mellotron (tracks 1, 2), piano (tracks 2, 5, 11), Hammond organ (tracks 4, 5), accordion (track 5)
- Brian Tichy – drums (tracks 1–3, 6), vocals (track 2), tambourine (tracks 5, 11), percussion (track 7)
- Mike Fasano – drums (track 4)
- Eric Singer – drums (tracks 5, 7, 10), background vocals (tracks 2, 7)
- Eric Skodis - drums (track 8)
- Winston Watson III – drums (tracks 9 12)
- Brian Irving - drums (track 11)
- Brian Smith – tambourine (track 4), background vocals (track 8)
- Roberta Freeman – background vocals (track 5)
