= 99 Live =

Live album by Gilby Clarke
- Released: 1999
- Recorded: 1999
- Genre: Rock
- Length: 39:54
- Label: Radio Mafia

Gilby Clarke chronology
Rubber (1998)	99 Live (1999)	Swag (2001)

Professional ratings
Review scores
Source	Rating
Allmusic	3.5/5 stars

99 Live is a live album by former Guns N' Roses guitarist Gilby Clarke. Recorded live in Hollywood, California the album was released in 1999.

== Track listing ==
All tracks are written by Clarke.

No.	Title	Length
1.	"Wasn't Yesterday Great"	3:12
2.	"Monkey Chow" (Slash's Snakepit cover)	4:54
3.	"Black"	5:08
4.	"Kilroy Was Here"	3:09
5.	"Motorcycle Cowboys"	4:14
6.	"Good Enough For Rock N' Roll"	3:21
7.	"Cure Me... Or Kill Me..."	5:16
8.	"Tijuana Jail"	10:35

== Personnel ==
- Gilby Clarke – lead vocals, rhythm guitar
- Tracii Guns – lead guitar
- Stefan Adika – bass guitar
- Eric Singer – drums
