= Gilby Clarke =

American guitarist (born 1962)

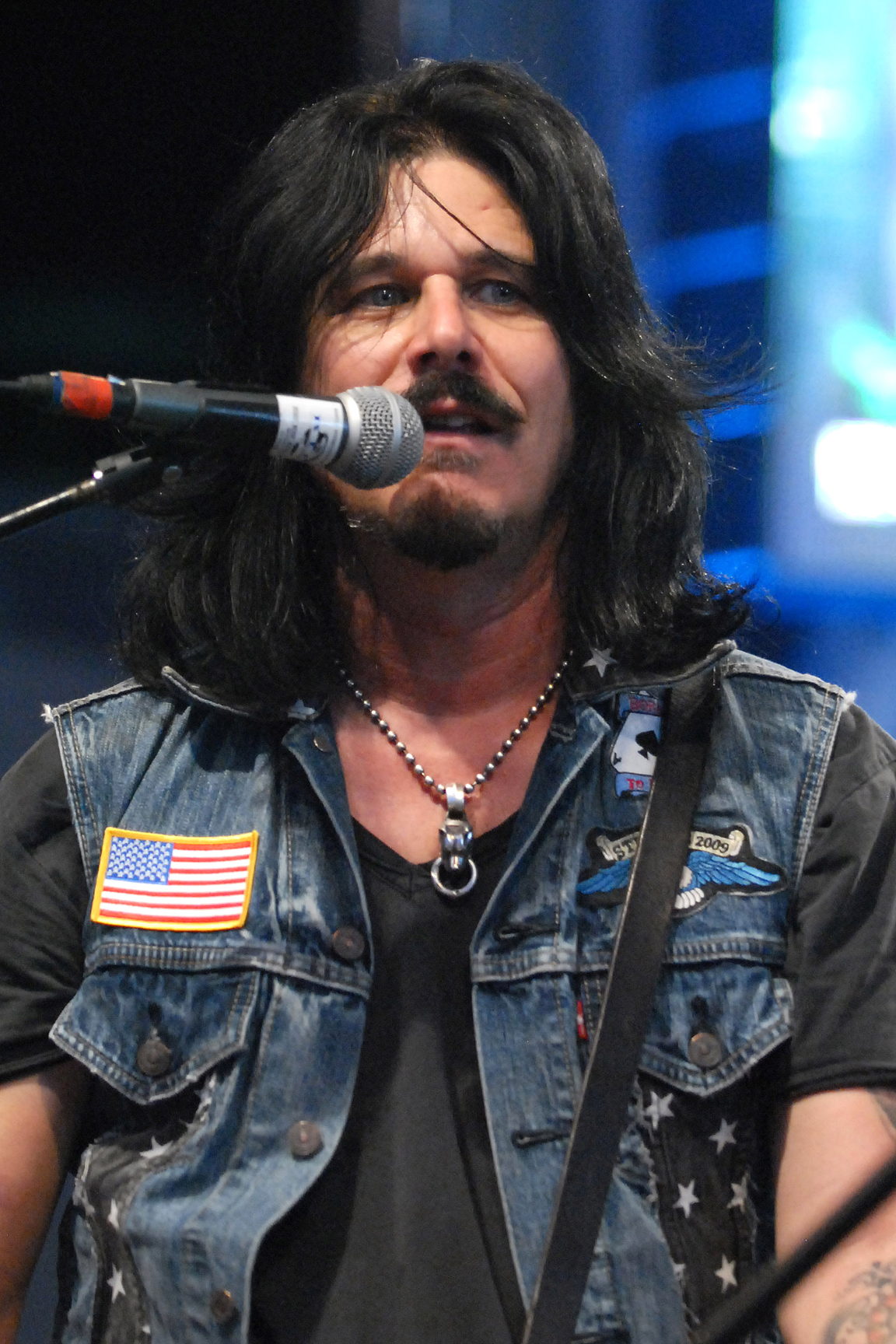
- Clarke in 2012

Background information
- Born: August 17, 1962 (age 64); Cleveland, Ohio, U.S.
- Genres: Hard rock; heavy metal
- Occupations: Musician; songwriter; record producer
- Instruments: Guitar; vocals
- Years active: 1984–present
- Formerly of: Guns N' Roses; Rock Star Supernova; Slash's Snakepit; Kill for Thrills; Candy
- Website: gilbyclarke.com

Gilbert J. Clarke (born August 17, 1962) is an American guitarist, singer, songwriter and record producer. He is known for having a three-year tenure as the rhythm guitarist of Guns N' Roses, replacing Izzy Stradlin in 1991 during the Use Your Illusion Tour, and also featured on "The Spaghetti Incident?" (1993). Following this, Clarke went on to forge a solo career and also played guitar with Slash's Snakepit, Kat Men, Heart, Nancy Sinatra, Kathy Valentine (of The Go-Go's), MC5 and forming his own group Rock Star Supernova with members of Metallica and Mötley Crüe.

Clarke's production work includes albums by L.A. Guns, Bullets and Octane, The Bronx, Frankie and the Studs and Vains of Jenna.

== Career ==
=== 1985–1991: Early career ===
Gilby Clarke started his musical career during the first half of the Eighties, replacing Candy's original guitarist, Geoff Siegel, who later played with the Nymphs. Gilby eventually replaced the band's lead vocalist and penned several unreleased fan favorites including, "Dance America". He left them to form Kill for Thrills, a metal band which released the EP Commercial Suicide and the LP Dynamite from Nightmareland before eventually disbanding. Kill for Thrills was a supergroup of sorts with Jason Nesmith (son of former Monkees Mike Nesmith) on Guitar, and Todd Muscat formerly of seminal L.A. Punk band Decry, on Bass and then later with Junkyard after Kill for Thrills. Muscat is also the brother of Brent Muscat (Faster Pussycat, L.A. Guns, Sin City Sinners). All members have deep roots in the Los Angeles rock scene.

=== 1991–1994: Guns N' Roses ===
Following rhythm guitarist Izzy Stradlin's decision to abruptly quit the band, during Use Your Illusion Tour in 1991, citing a combination of Axl Rose's personal behavior (he would consistently delay the start of shows by hours at a time) and his mismanagement of the band and difficulties being around Slash, Sorum, and McKagan due to his new-found sobriety and their continuing alcohol and substance addictions, Clarke was chosen as his replacement, playing out the rest of gigs of the tour which lasted until 1993. His first show with the band was December 5, 1991 in Worcester, MA, USA.

During many shows throughout the tour, Rose introduced Clarke and had him play "Wild Horses", a Rolling Stones cover with Slash.

On November 23, 1993, Guns N' Roses released a collection of punk and glam rock covers entitled "The Spaghetti Incident?" where many of the tracks were recorded with original Guns N' Roses guitarist Izzy Stradlin during the Use Your Illusion I and II sessions and then were later re-recorded by Clarke.

Clarke's contract was not renewed and he was gone from the band by 1995. Slash stated in his book that Rose fired Clarke without consulting anyone, claiming he was only a "hired hand". Clarke was not involved in the recording of "Sympathy for the Devil", stating "I knew that that was the ending [of Clarke's involvement in Guns N' Roses] because nobody told me about it. Officially I was in the band at that time, and they did that song without me". Clarke also mentioned that before the final show of the Use Your Illusion Tour, Rose came up to him and told him "Hey, enjoy your last show". Clarke later sued the band over the use of his likeness in the 1994 Guns N' Roses pinball machine.

Clarke's only other appearances on a Guns N' Roses release would be on the live and compilation albums Live Era '87–'93 and Greatest Hits.

Clarke is featured on Guns N' Roses video releases Use Your Illusion I, Use Your Illusion II and Welcome to the Videos.

=== 1994–1995: Pawnshop Guitars & Slash's Snakepit ===
In 1994, he released his debut solo album Pawnshop Guitars on Virgin Records which featured contributions from several of his close friends. Ryan Roxie (Alice Cooper, Electric Angels) on guitar, Will Effertz on Bass and Marc Danzeisen (Riverdogs, Little Caesar) Drums and backing vocals, also including all the then members of Guns N' Roses. It went gold in Argentina.

Following the end of the Use Your Illusion Tour in 1993, Guns N' Roses guitarist Slash began recording demos of material that he had written during the tour, at his home studio with bandmate Matt Sorum. Clarke and Alice in Chains bassist Mike Inez soon started to come around to jam with them. They eventually recorded twelve demo songs. Eric Dover, live guitarist for Jellyfish, successfully auditioned to become the group's singer. Slash and Dover wrote the lyrics for all the tracks, except "Monkey Chow" which was contributed by Clarke and "Jizz da Pit" which is an instrumental written by both Slash and Inez. The album was released by Geffen Records in February 1995 charting at No. 70 on the Billboard 200. For the tour in support of the album, James LoMenzo and Brian Tichy, both members of Zakk Wylde's solo band, joined the band to replace Inez and Sorum who could not tour with the group due to other commitments. With Guns N' Roses regrouping to record a new album, Snakepit disbanded with Clarke resuming his solo career.

=== 1995-2006: Solo career and new projects ===
Since then he has released another three solo albums, The Hangover, Rubber and 2002's Swag as well as the live album 99 Live.

He formed the band Col. Parker with ex-Stray Cat Slim Jim Phantom and former touring additional GN'R keyboardist Teddy "Zig Zag" Andreadis, releasing the album Rock N Roll Music in 2001.

In addition, he made a guest appearance on the L.A. Guns album Shrinking Violet, which he also produced. Clarke also produced The Bronx's self-titled album released in 2003 and Girlsplayboys debut album From Ritual to Romance in 2006, and L.A. Guns' 2001 album Man in the Moon.

In 2002, Clarke worked with Nancy Sinatra on her album California Girl and a year later joined Heart on their national tour.

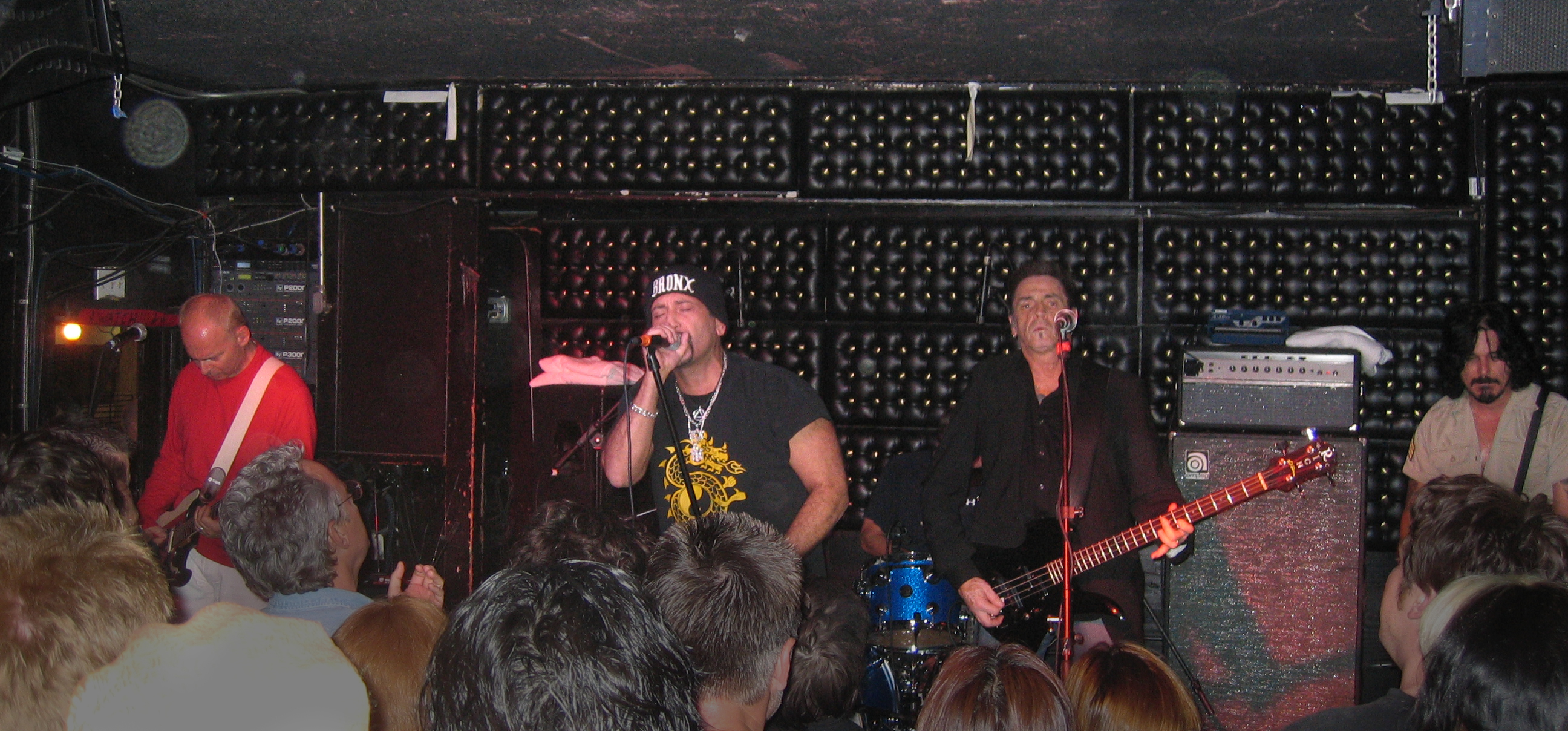
Clarke (far right) along with the reformed MC5 in 2005.

In 2005, he played along with the reformed MC5, joining original members Wayne Kramer, Dennis Thompson, and Michael Davis, along with new vocalist Handsome Dick Manitoba.

=== 2006–2012: Rock Star Supernova and reunion with GNR on Rock and Roll Hall of Fame ===
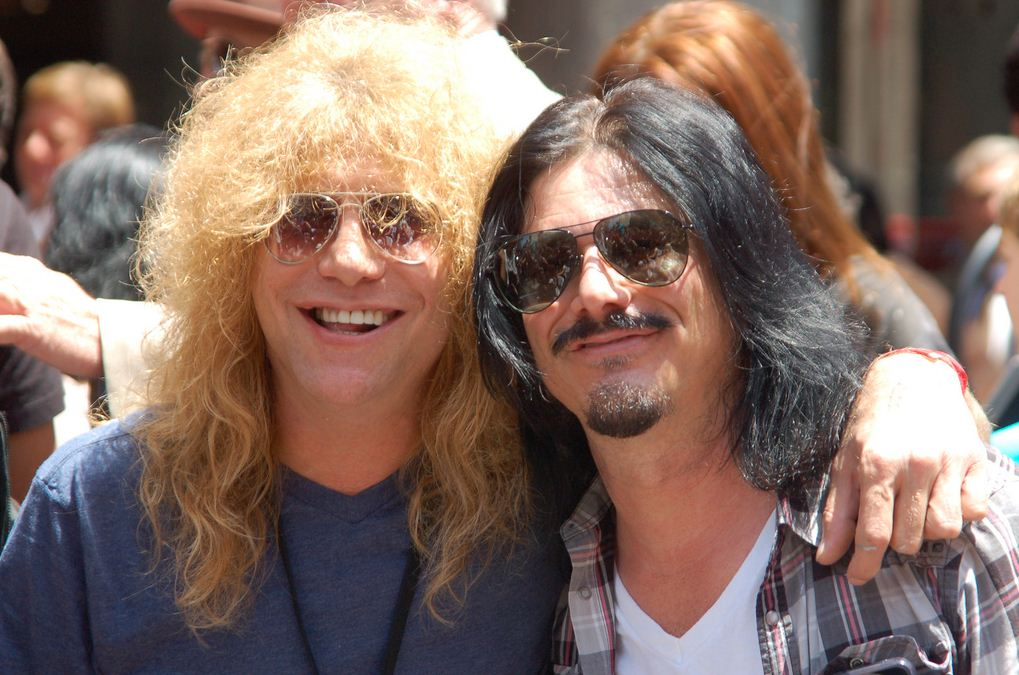
Clarke (right) with Steven Adler in July 2012

In 2006, Mötley Crüe drummer, Tommy Lee, formed Supernova with Clarke on guitars and former Metallica bassist Jason Newsted. The band used the TV show Rock Star to find a new lead singer. Lukas Rossi was chosen as their lead singer. However, there was already a band from California called Supernova. On June 26, 2006, the California band filed a federal lawsuit and on September 12, 2006, U.S. District Judge John A. Houston in San Diego ruled in favor of the original Supernova, granting their request for a preliminary injunction. The injunction stopped the band from Rock Star: Supernova from "performing rock and roll music, or recording, or selling rock and roll music recordings under the same name, pending a trial of this action on its merits, or until otherwise ordered by the court." The band renamed itself Rock Star Supernova.

Clarke produced a cover of Johnny Cash's "Ring of Fire" on Rock Star: Supernova runner-up Dilana Robichaux's 2007 album, also released as a single on digital download websites.

When re-recording "Kick Out The Jams" for the video game Guitar Hero: World Tour, Clarke was brought in for additional guitar work, along with Jerry Cantrell.

In 2007 he released a best of album featuring tracks from all of his solo albums as well as two songs from the Col. Parker project and a rerecording of the song "Black", featuring vocals by Dilana.

In July 2008 Clarke played at the G-TARanaki Guitar Festival in New Zealand. His solo band included bassist Muddy Stardust and drummer Dennis Morehouse. He then toured North America as part of the Rock n' Roll Fantasy Camp.

Clarke reunited with Guns N' Roses members Slash, Steven Adler, Matt Sorum and Duff McKagan, during the live performance, at the band's Rock and Roll Hall of Fame induction on April 14, 2012. Clarke himself was not inducted as part of the band.

=== 2021-present: "The Gospel Truth" and touring ===
In 2021 Clarke released his most successful album to date, The Gospel Truth on Golden Robot Records. It featured a host of well-known musicians including Nikki Sixx.

== Discography ==
=== Albums and EPs ===
==== With Candy ====
- Whatever Happened To Fun (1985)
- Teenage Neon Jungle (2003)

==== With Kill for Thrills ====
- Commercial Suicide (1989)
- Dynamite From Nightmareland (1990)

==== With The Loveless ====
- guest lead guitar on "Wish I Could Fly" (1994) track on album "A Tale of Gin and Salvation".

==== With Guns N' Roses ====
- "The Spaghetti Incident?" (1993)
- Live Era '87–'93 (1999)

==== Solo ====
- Pawnshop Guitars (1994)
- Blooze E.P. (1995)
- The Hangover (1997)
- Rubber (1998)
- 99 Live (1999)
- Swag (2001)
- Gilby Clarke (2007, compilation)
- The Gospel Truth (2021)

==== With Slash's Snakepit ====
- It's 5 O'Clock Somewhere (1995)

==== With Col. Parker ====
- Rock N Roll Music (2001)

==== With Nancy Sinatra ====
- California Girl (2002)

==== With Rock Star Supernova ====
- Rock Star Supernova (2006)
