= Candy (band) =

American pop rock band, 1982–1988

- Origin: Los Angeles, California
- Genres: Power pop, glam metal
- Years active: 1982–1988
- Past members: Jonathan Daniel; John Schubert; Kyle Vincent; Geoff Siegel; Gilby Clarke; Ryan Roxie

Candy was a Los Angeles-based pop rock band, featuring future Guns N' Roses guitarist Gilby Clarke and singer-songwriter Kyle Vincent. Original members were Vincent on lead vocals, bassist Jonathan Daniel, drummer John Schubert, and guitarist Geoff Siegel, who departed the group after six months and after a short stint in LA's Bang Bang, later joined the Nymphs. Their music has been described as power pop.

== Biography ==
Candy started playing live in the LA area and recording demos in 1981. Their only studio album, titled Whatever Happened To Fun, produced by Jimmy Ienner, was released in 1985, when the band toured the United States opening up for Rick Springfield and later Corey Hart. Wally Bryson from the Raspberries served as musical director on the album, which was recorded at Criteria Studios in Miami, FL. The music video for the single "Whatever Happened To Fun", directed by Dominic Orlando, was filmed on location in Hollywood, with Candy performing to a street crowd and a mural of famous old Hollywood stars.

In 1986, Vincent left the band to pursue a solo career, with Clarke taking over as lead vocalist and guitarist Ryan Roxie joining the lineup. After Clarke left, the remaining members joined up with new lead vocalist Shane and became the Electric Angels. Vincent has since enjoyed a successful solo career, releasing twenty albums, touring, and scoring a Billboard Adult Top 20 single, "Wake Me Up (When The World's Worth Waking Up For)"; Daniel is a music industry manager of many top acts, including Sia, Train, Butch Walker, Fall Out Boy, and others; while Schubert went into university and studied history and education. Since 2006, he's taught middle school history and currently teaches in Carmel, CA at All Saints Day School.

In 2003, SongTree Records released "Teenage Neon Jungle (Rare & Unreleased)", a 25-track collection of the band's demos, live tracks, and post-Candy projects, both solo and band. In 2012, Whatever Happened to Fun was released for the first time on CD on the Rock Candy label.

In 2016, Vincent re-recorded and released "Whatever Happened to Fun", as the B-side on his Japan-issued "Narita (Tokyo Girl)" single. The song was recorded in Tokyo using Vincent's Japan Candy band, with Kyle on lead vocals.

== Discography ==
=== Studio albums ===
- Whatever Happened to Fun (1985) Mercury/Polygram
- Teenage Neon Jungle (Rare & Unreleased) (2003) SongTree

=== Singles ===
- "Whatever Happened to Fun" (1985) Mercury/Polygram
