= Beach bum trust provision =

A beach bum trust provision, in the law of trusts, ties the ability of a trust beneficiary to take from the trust to the beneficiary's own earnings.

== Background ==
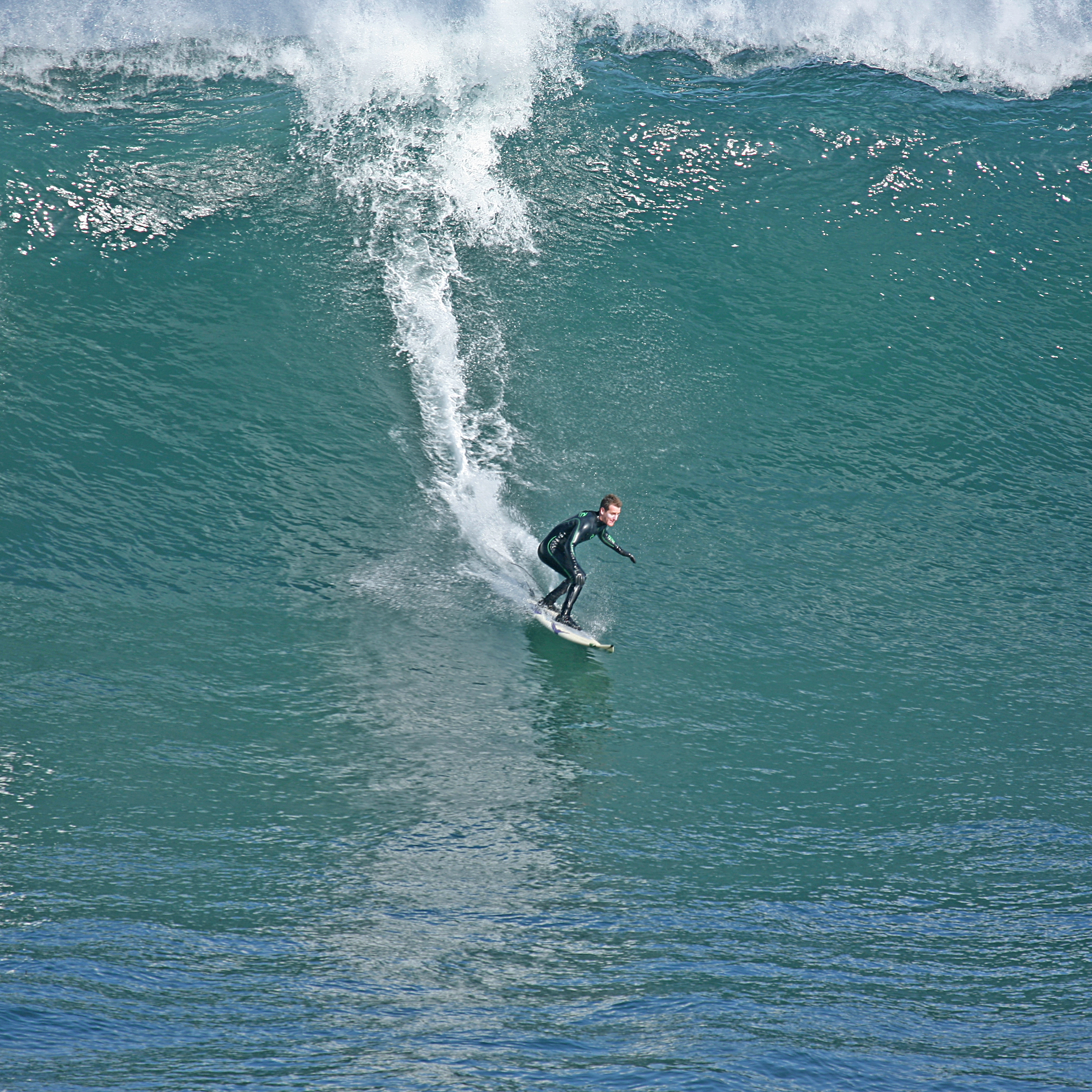
Surfing in southern California 2008

"Beach bum trust provisions" may take a variety of forms, such as by requiring a beneficiary to attain a certain job or degree, or by using the beneficiary's own income to determine how much money they can take from the trust fund at a given time. Such a provision serves to prevent a beneficiary from lazily living off the trust funds (i.e. a "beach bum"). If the beneficiary earns no income, then he or she reaps nothing from the trust.
