= Puck bunny =

Ardent female hockey fan

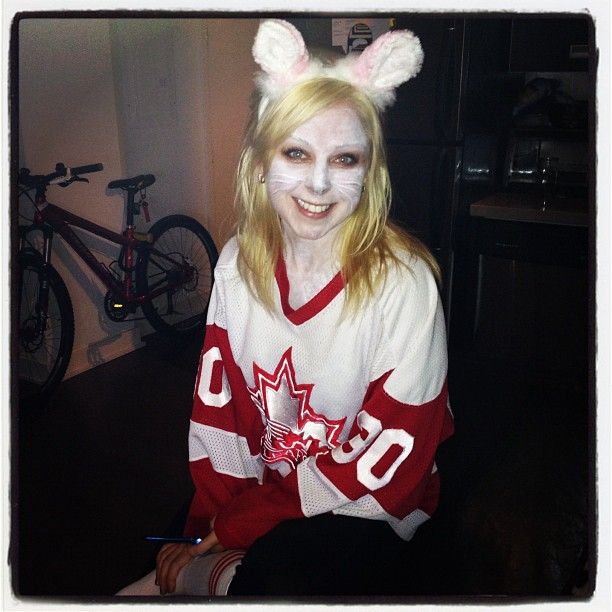
A woman dressed as a "puck bunny", 2011

A puck bunny is a term used to describe a female ice hockey fan whose interest in the sport is purported to be primarily motivated by sexual attraction to the players rather than enjoyment of the game itself. Primarily a Canadian term, it gained popular currency in the 21st century, and in 2004 was added to the second edition of the Canadian Oxford Dictionary.

The term is somewhat analogous to the term groupie as it relates to musicians. Sociological studies of the phenomenon in minor league hockey indicate that self-proclaimed "puck bunnies" are "'proud as punch' to have sex with the [players]", as it confers social status on them. However, these transitory relationships are often contrasted with those of girlfriends, with whom players have more stable, long-term relationships. In similar terminology, a female fan who hangs around rodeo cowboys is called a "buckle bunny", in reference to large belt-buckles given as awards.

== In media ==
An article published in the Toronto Star in 1992 profiled young female fans of a Junior A hockey team. The article labeled the female fans, most of whom were in eighth grade, as "puck bunnies". The article described the puck bunnies as sporting heavy make-up and having a "desperate look about them". The article quotes a member of the hockey team describing the difference between puck bunnies and girlfriends: "The difference between a girlfriend and a puck bunny is we like our girlfriends... They think just because we go to bed with them that we like them, but we don't".

In an article for the National Post, Joe O'Connor described the puck bunny as a woman that "in all her form-fitted-crop-top glory, can be found in arenas around the NHL, just waiting to stand up and bounce during breaks in action".

In a 2008 Maclean's article, Canadian actress Elisha Cuthbert was labeled a "puck bunny" for being romantically linked to three hockey players.

== Context ==
Organized sports, including hockey, have long had a male-dominated culture. While the percentage of female game-goers varies by country, North American hockey audiences are primarily male, while female fans remain the minority. As visible minorities, female hockey fans are often stigmatized, and their intentions are frequently called into question. The term "puck bunny" is often used to belittle female supporters by questioning their authenticity and the reason for their interest in the game.

"Puck bunnies" are defined by the sociologists Garry Crawford and Victoria K. Gosling as:

The term 'puck bunny', which is applied almost exclusively to female ice hockey fans, implies that these supporters are 'inauthentic', not 'dedicated' in their support, and are more interested in the sexual attractiveness of the players rather than the sport itself.

The label of "puck bunnies" stereotypes female fans as superficial supporters of hockey and perpetuates male precedent over the sport. However, a study found that female fans at games are often just as knowledgeable as the male fans, and that the physical attractiveness of players does not necessarily play a significant role in attracting females to the sport. Some female fans object to the term, as they are often labeled as puck bunnies simply by their presence at a game, regardless of their true intentions or motivations. As a result, many fans resort to subduing their femininity and perceived sexual attractiveness in order to be taken as serious fans of the game. Other female fans embrace the use of the term as a way of making a distinction between a puck bunny and a "true" female fan of the sport. Some fans come up with suggestive signs that say things like, "I want my headboard to give you a concussion," "Show me a hat trick and I'll show you a sex trick," "Meet us behind the Zamboni," "Can I hold your stick" or "you can put it through my five-hole.".

In sex scandals involving college athletes, "groupie"-related terms (such as puck bunny) have been used against sexual assault victims to imply blame or consensual intercourse. As Nelson notes, puck bunnies and other "groupies" are often seen as both sexual objects and sexual predators. Other college practices that utilize puck bunnies and other "groupies" include using women who are perceived as sexually attractive to recruit male athletes.

== See also ==
- Buckle bunny
- Beach bunny
- Ski bunny
