= Groupie =

Fan who follows a particular celebrity while on tour

A groupie is a fan of a particular musical group who follows the band around while they are on tour or who attends as many of their public appearances as possible, with the hope of meeting them. The term is used mostly describing young women, and sometimes men, who follow these individuals aiming to gain fame of their own, or help with behind-the-scenes work, or to initiate a relationship of some kind, intimate or otherwise. The term is also used to describe similarly enthusiastic fans of athletes, writers, and other public figures.

== Origin in music ==
The word groupie originated around 1965 to describe teen-aged girls or young women who began following a particular group or band of musicians on a regular basis. The phenomenon was much older; Mary McCarthy had earlier described it in her novel The Company She Keeps (1942). Some sources have attributed the coining of the word to The Rolling Stones bassist Bill Wyman during the group's 1965 Australian tour; but Wyman said he and his bandmates used other "code words" for women on tour. Possibly the earliest song to refer to groupies was "Motherly Love" by The Mothers of Invention, recorded on March 9th, 1966.

A prominent explanation of the groupie concept came from Rolling Stone magazine, which published an issue devoted to the topic, Groupies: The Girls of Rock (February 1969), which emphasized the sexual behavior of rock musicians and groupies. Time magazine published an article, "Manners And Morals: The Groupies", later that month. Also that year, journalists Jenny Fabian and Johnny Byrne released a largely autobiographical novel called Groupie (1969). The following year, a documentary film titled Groupies (1970) was released.

Female groupies in particular have a long-standing reputation of being available to celebrities, pop stars, rock stars, and other public figures. Led Zeppelin singer Robert Plant is quoted as distinguishing between fans who wanted brief sexual encounters, and "groupies" who traveled with musicians for extended periods of time, acting as a surrogate girlfriend, and often taking care of the musician's wardrobe and social life. Women who adopt this role are sometimes referred to as "road wives". Cynthia Plaster Caster, Cleo Odzer, Barbara Cope (The Butter Queen) and The GTOs (Girls Together Outrageously), with Pamela Des Barres, in particular, as de facto spokeswoman, are probably the best-known groupies of this type.

Geri Miller was a topless dancer and underground film actress associated with Pop artist Andy Warhol in New York who described herself as a "super-groupie." In his 1974 book Show Business Laid Bare, columnist Earl Wilson contrasted Miller with the groupies who typically operated in groups, portraying her as an individual who sought out rock stars herself.

A characteristic that may classify one as a groupie is a reputation for promiscuity. Connie Hamzy, also known as "Sweet Connie", a prominent groupie in the 1960s, argues in favor of the groupie movement and defends her chosen lifestyle by saying, "Look, we're not hookers, we loved the glamour". However, her openness regarding her sexual endeavors with various rock stars is exactly what has enhanced the negative connotations surrounding her type. For example, she stated in the Los Angeles Times article "Pop & Hiss" (December 15, 2010): "Hamzy, unlike the other groupies, was never looking to build relationships. She was after sex, and she unabashedly shared intimate moments with virtually every rock star—even their roadies—who came through Arkansas." However, some groupies also downplayed the sexual connotations of the term. Speaking about the "groupie" label, former baby groupie Lori Mattix stated, "I feel like it's been degraded somewhere along the way, and it was never meant to be negative. Groupies in the old days were girlfriends of the band. They were classy and sophisticated, but now you hear the word groupie and you think of hookers and strippers."

Des Barres, who wrote two books detailing her experiences as a groupie—I'm with the Band (1987) and Take Another Little Piece of My Heart: A Groupie Grows Up (1993)—as well as another non-fiction book, Rock Bottom: Dark Moments in Music Babylon, asserts that a groupie is to a rock band as Mary Magdalene was to Jesus. Her most recent book, Let's Spend the Night Together (2007), is a collection of wildly varied interviews with classic "old school" groupies including Catherine James, Connie Hamzy, Cherry Vanilla, and Margaret Moser. Des Barres, who married rock singer/actor Michael Des Barres, also persuaded cult actress Tura Satana, singer and model Bebe Buell, actress Patti D'Arbanville, and Cassandra Peterson, better known as "Elvira, Mistress of the Dark", to talk about their relationships with musicians.

Also according to Des Barres' book, there is at least one male groupie, Pleather, who followed female celebrities such as Courtney Love and members of the 1980s pop group The Pandoras.

The "groupie" label, as it was used in the music scene, has been criticized by some feminist scholars for diminishing the role that women played in supporting and creating music. Norma Coates, a scholar of media and cultural studies, notes that Rolling Stone's 1969 special report on groupies also included profiles of women who were not groupies at all but rather musicians in their own right. According to model and groupie Bebe Buell, groupies sometimes became music celebrities in their own right. Speaking about "baby" groupies Sable Starr and Lori Mattix, she stated, "Every rock star that came to L.A. wanted to meet them, it wasn't the other way around." Music critic Ralph J. Gleason noted that as the prominence of the most well-known groupies increased, they became the "people that others looked to when determining whether a band was 'cool.'

== American space program ==
During the Mercury, Gemini, and Apollo American space programs in the 1960s, women would hang around the hotels of Clear Lake in Houston, home to many astronauts, and Cocoa Beach in Florida near the rocket launching site at Cape Canaveral, "collecting" astronauts. Joan Roosa, wife of Apollo 14 Command Module Pilot Stu Roosa, recalled: "I was at a party one night in Houston. A woman standing behind me, who had no idea who I was, said 'I've slept with every astronaut who has been to the Moon.' ... I said 'Pardon me, but I don't think so.'"

== Sports ==
Groupies also play a role in sports. A puck bunny is an ice hockey fan whose interest in the sport is primarily motivated by sexual attraction to the players rather than enjoyment of the game itself. Primarily a Canadian term, it gained popular currency in the 21st century, and in 2004 was added to the second edition of the Canadian Oxford Dictionary which defines it as follows:

Puck bunny: a young female hockey fan, especially one motivated more by a desire to meet the players than by an interest in hockey.

The term is somewhat analogous to the term "groupie" as it relates to rock and roll musicians. Sociological studies of the phenomenon in minor league hockey indicate that self-proclaimed "puck bunnies" are "'proud as punch' to have sex with the [players]", as it confers social status on them. However, these transitory relationships are often contrasted with those of girlfriends, with whom players have more stable, long-term relationships.

"Buckle bunnies" are a well-known part of the world of rodeo. The term comes from a slang term for women ("bunnies"), and from the prize belt buckles awarded to the winners in rodeo, which are highly sought by the bunnies. According to one report, bunnies "usually do not expect anything more than sex from the rodeo participants and vice versa".

In a 1994 Spin magazine feature, Elizabeth Gilbert characterized buckle bunnies as an essential element of the rodeo scene, and described a particularly dedicated group of bunnies who are known on the rodeo circuit for their supportive attitude and generosity, going beyond sex, to "some fascination with providing the most macho group of guys on Earth with the only brand of nurturing they will accept".

Recently, in Irish sport, particularly in Gaelic Athletic Association sports the term "Jersey Puller" or "Jersey Tugger" has been used to describe females who are romantically interested in players. The term refers to the pulling of a player's top. The term can range from individuals who look to be romantically linked with senior intercounty players to local players playing for their parish.

== In popular culture ==
=== Film ===
- Groupies (1970), documentary
- 200 Motels (1971), by Frank Zappa about life on the road.
- Almost Famous (2000) depicts groupies who call themselves "band aids".
- The Banger Sisters (2002) depicts two middle-aged women who used to be friends and groupies when they were young.
- Secret Lives of Women: Groupies (2009), a reality television spot featured the Beatle Bandaids (a modern day vintage groupie troupe), Pamela Des Barres, and the Plastics (professional groupies).
- In Woody Allen's movie Midnight in Paris (2011), Gil Pender (Owen Wilson) comments that Adriana is taking the word "art groupie" to a whole new level.
- "de:Ich – ein Groupie"

=== Literature ===
- Des Barres, Pamela (1987). I'm with the Band: Confessions of a Groupie. Chicago Review Press. ISBN 9781556525896.
- —, — (2008) [1992]. Take Another Little Piece of My Heart: A Groupie Grows Up. Chicago Review Press. ISBN 9781569766804.
- —, — (2008). Rock Bottom: Dark Moments in Music Babylon. Chicago Review Press. ISBN 978-1556527890.
- —, — (2007). Let's Spend the Night Together: Backstage Secrets of Rock Muses and Supergroupies. Chicago Review Press. ISBN 9781556526688.
- Fabian, Jenny; Byrne, Johnny (1969). Groupie.
- McCarthy, Mary (1942). The Company She Keeps.
- McLean, Malcolm (2019). Freak Like Me: Confessions of a 90s Pop Groupie. RedDoor Press. ISBN 9781910453698.
- Priscus, Sarah (2022). Groupies. HarperCollins. ISBN 978-0063218017.
- Rhodes, Lisa L. (2005). Electric Ladyland: Women and Rock Culture. University of Pennsylvania Press. pp. 156–176. ISBN 9780812238402.
- Wyman, Bill (1997). Bill Wyman, Stone Alone: The Story of a Rock 'n' Roll Band. Da Capo Press. p. 294. ISBN 978-0306807831.

=== Music ===
- The GTOs (Girls Together Outrageously), is a band organized by Frank Zappa in the late 1960s, composed of seven groupies: Miss Pamela (Pamela Des Barres de facto spokeswoman), Miss Sparky (Linda Sue Parker), Miss Lucy (Lucy McLaren), Miss Christine (Christine Frka), Miss Sandra (Sandra Leano), Miss Mercy (Mercy Fontentot), and Miss Cynderella (Cynthia Cale-Binion)
