= Pat Benatar discography =

Discography of American singer Pat Benatar

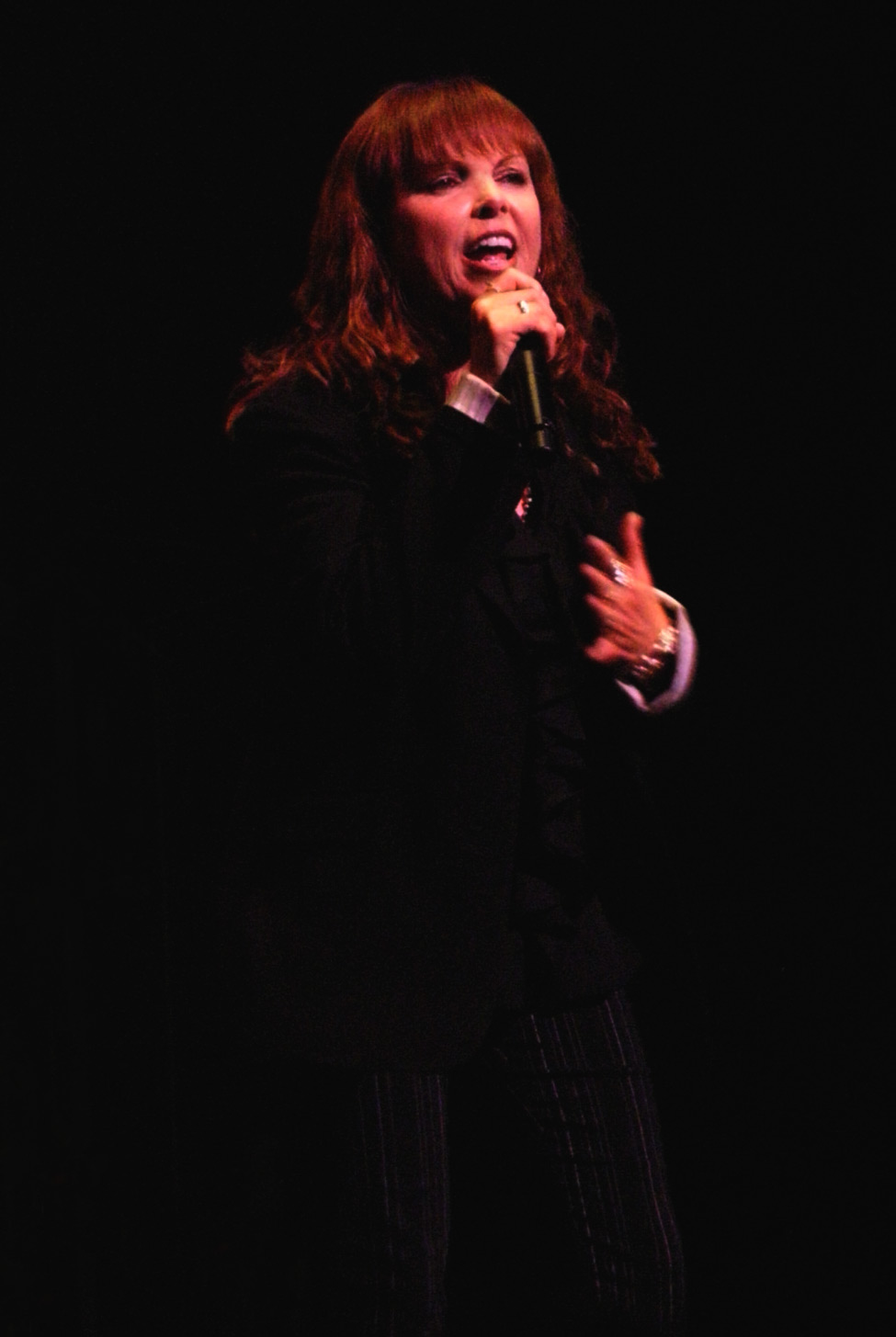
- Benatar performing live in Sydney, Australia in 2010
- Studio albums: 11
- Live albums: 12
- Compilation albums: 27
- Tribute albums: 4
- Singles: 40
- Video albums: 7
- Music videos: 36

This is the discography of American singer Pat Benatar. It consists of 11 studio albums, nine live albums, 27 compilation albums, 39 singles and 34 music videos.

== Albums ==
=== Studio albums ===
List of albums, with selected chart positions, sales, and certifications
Title	Album details	Peak chart position										Certifications
Title	Album details	US	AUS	CAN	FRA	GER	NED	NZ	SWE	SWI	UK	Certifications
In the Heat of the Night	Release date: August 27, 1979; Label: Chrysalis; Format: LP record, 8-track, cassette, CD	12	25	3	20	—	—	8	—	—	98*	RIAA: Platinum; MC: 4× Platinum; RMNZ: Platinum
Crimes of Passion	Release date: August 5, 1980; Label: Chrysalis; Format: LP record, 8-track, cassette, CD	2	16	2	2	—	—	6	27	—	—	RIAA: 4× Platinum; MC: 5× Platinum; RMNZ: Gold
Precious Time	Release date: July 6, 1981; Label: Chrysalis; Format: LP record, 8-track, cassette, CD	1	8	2	3	57	46	2	9	—	30	RIAA: 2× Platinum; MC: 2× Platinum; RMNZ: Gold
Get Nervous	Release date: October 29, 1982; Label: Chrysalis; Format: LP record, Cassette, CD	4	15	16	14	—	—	15	18	—	73	RIAA: Platinum; ARIA: Gold; MC: Platinum; RMNZ: Gold
Tropico	Release date: November 1, 1984; Label: Chrysalis; Format: LP record, Cassette, CD	14	9	21	16	26	23	7	19	21	31	RIAA: Platinum; MC: Platinum; BPI: Silver; RMNZ: Platinum
Seven the Hard Way	Release date: November 13, 1985; Label: Chrysalis; Format: LP record, Cassette, CD	26	19	36	—	42	—	2	33	—	69	RIAA: Gold; MC: Platinum; RMNZ: Gold
Wide Awake in Dreamland	Release date: July 4, 1988; Label: Chrysalis; Format: LP record, Cassette, CD	28	13	11	—	47	—	15	33	—	11	RIAA: Gold; BPI: Gold; MC: Platinum
True Love	Release date: April 9, 1991; Label: Chrysalis; Format: LP record, Cassette, CD	37	53	22	—	—	52	30	30	39	40	MC: Gold
Gravity's Rainbow	Release date: June 1, 1993; Label: Chrysalis; Format: LP record, Cassette, CD	85	130	44	—	—	—	—	—	—	—	
Innamorata	Release date: June 3, 1997; Label: CMC International; Format: LP record, CD	171	—	—	—	—	—	—	—	—	—	
Go	Release date: August 12, 2003; Label: Bel Chiasso; Format: CD	187	—	—	—	—	—	—	—	—	—	
"—" denotes releases that did not chart.

* Benatar's debut album, In the Heat of the Night, did not chart in the UK following its original release, but charted in 1985 after it was re-released by Chrysalis Records.

=== Live albums ===
List of albums, with selected chart positions, sales, and certifications
Title	Album details	Peak chart position									Certifications
Title	Album details	US	AUS	CAN	FRA	GER	NED	NZ	SWE	UK	Certifications
Live from Earth	Release date: September 22, 1983; Label: Chrysalis; Format: LP record, cassette, CD	13	2	25	22	7	4	12	45	60	RIAA: Platinum; MC: Platinum; RMNZ: Platinum
8-15-80	Release date: 1998; Label: CMC International; Format: CD	—	—	—	—	—	—	—	—	—	
Concert Classics	Released: July 1998; Label: Ranch Life; Format: CD (CRANCH 6)	—	—	—	—	—	—	—	—	—	
Greatest Hits Live	Released: March 14, 2000; Label: King Biscuit Flower Hour Records; Format: CD (70710-88054-2)	—	—	—	—	—	—	—	—	—	
From the Front Row... Live!	Release date: May 25, 2003; Label: Silverline; Format: DVD-Audio (288150-9)	—	—	—	—	—	—	—	—	—	
35th Anniversary Tour (with Neil Giraldo)	Release date: April 28, 2015; Label: Mailboat Records; Format: 2×CD+DVD (MBD 8500), DVD (MBDVD 8501), 2×CD (MBD 8502)	— (Note: 35th Anniversary Tour did not enter the Billboard 200, but reached number 21 on the Independent albums chart, number 38 on the Top Rock Albums chart and number 38 on the Top Rock & Alternative albums chart.)	—	—	—	—	—	—	—	—	

=== Compilations ===
Year	Title	Peak chart positions				Certifications	Additional information
Year	Title	US	UK	AUS	NZ	Certifications	Additional information
1974	Coxon's Army: Live from Sam Miller's Exchange Cafe	—	—	—	—		Pat Benatar sings the following songs: "Can't Help Lovin' Dat Man" (written by Oscar Hammerstein II and Jerome Kern), "Respect" (written by Otis Redding), "If He Walked Into My Life" (written by Jerry Herman), "Medley: Brother Love's Traveling Salvation Show/Yes We Can Can" (written by Neil Diamond / Allen Toussaint).
1989	Best Shots	67	6	19	5	BPI: Platinum	Greatest hits compilation issued internationally (one CD), 1987. Completely different release (one CD) by same title issued in the US, 1989. US release re-issued in 2003 (one CD/one DVD) with the DVD Choice Cuts: Pat Benatar – The Complete Video Collection.
1994	Greatest Hits	—	—	—	—		Canadian one-CD greatest hits release with 16 tracks. Polytel/EMI
1994	All Fired Up: The Very Best of Pat Benatar	—	—	—	2		Two-CD compilation featuring remastered greatest hits, mostly edit versions. Last album released by Chrysalis Records. Issued in the UK with a different cover.
1996	Pat Benatar: Heartbreaker – Sixteen Classic Performances	—	—	—	—		One CD featuring hits, album and two unreleased live tracks.
1996	Back to Back Hits: Blondie/Pat Benatar	—	—	—	—		One CD featuring five hits from both artists. Re-issued four more times with four different covers each time.
1996	Pat Benatar The Very Best of Volume 2	—	—	—	—		One-CD greatest hits release
1998	In the Heat of the Night/Tropico	—	—	—	—		Two-CD remastered release
1998	In the Heat of the Night/Crimes of Passion	—	—	—	—		Two-CD remastered release
1999	Pat Benatar All-Time Greatest Hits	—	—	—	—		Three-CD box set featuring hits, album and live tracks.
1999	Synchronistic Wanderings: Recorded Anthology 1979–1999	—	—	—	—		Three-CD box set featuring hits, album tracks, soundtrack and previously unreleased rarities.
1999	Precious Time/Get Nervous	—	—	—	—		Two-CD remastered release
1999	Tropico/Seven the Hard Way	—	—	—	—		Two-CD remastered release
1999	Innamorata/Eight-Fifteen-Eighty	—	—	—	—		Two-CD combination release
2000	Extended Versions: Pat Benatar – The Encore Collection	—	—	—	—		One CD featuring hits and album tracks from the King Biscuit Flower Hour.
2001	Best of Pat Benatar Volume 1 and Volume 2	—	—	—	—		Two CDs featuring hits and album tracks. Released both separately and together.
2001	Pat Benatar/Neil Giraldo: Summer Vacation Tour Book DVD	—	—	—	—		One DVD featuring 15 live tracks including four new songs; originally released to fan club members with different packaging but same track listing.
2001	Pat Benatar/Neil Giraldo: Summer Vacation Soundtrack	—	—	—	—		One CD 15-track live concert album featuring four new songs; originally released to fan club members with different packaging and additional tracks on two CDs.
2001	Premium Gold Collection	—	—	—	—		One-CD greatest hits release
2001	The Collection	—	—	—	—		One-CD greatest hits release
2004	Best of Pat Benatar Volume 1 and Volume 2	—	—	—	—		Two CDs featuring hits and album tracks; previously released as two separate CDs. Re-issued in the 2008 "Green Series".
2004	Live from Earth/Wide Awake in Dreamland	—	—	—	—		Two-CD remastered release
2005	Greatest Hits	47	—	—	26	BPI: Silver	One CD 20-track comprehensive hit singles collection. Re-issued in 2007 (two CDs/one DVD) with the CD Live from Earth and the DVD Choice Cuts: Pat Benatar: The Complete Video Collection. Re-issued in the 2008 "Green Series". Re-issued 2010 in the Live Life Greener Merch Box (includes green bag).
2008	Ultimate Collection	—	—	—	—		Two-CD compilation with 40 tracks, featuring an acoustic version of "Everytime I Fall Back" from an appearance on the soap opera The Young and the Restless; digital collection
2009	Pat Benatar Collector's Edition	—	—	—	—		Three-CD compilation in a tin packaging released by Madacy Records.
2009	10 Great Songs	123	—	—	—		One-CD compilation
2009	Pat Benatar Essential	—	—	—	—		One-CD greatest hits release
2010	True Love/Gravity's Rainbow	—	—	—	—		Two-CD remastered release
2011	Best Shots/Wide Awake in Dreamland	—	—	—	—		Two-CD remastered release
2011	Pat Benatar Performance	—	—	—	—		One-CD remastered release
2013	Icons	—	—	—	—		One-CD compilation
2014	The Best of Pat Benatar: 20th Century Masters/The Millennium Collection	—	—	—	—		One-CD compilation
2014	The One and Only CD: Pat Benatar the Very Best Of	—	—	—	—		One-CD compilation different track listing than the European very best of.
2017	Pat Benatar: 5 Classic Albums	—	—	—	—		Five-CD remastered release. Includes the albums In the Heat of the Night, Crimes of Passion, Get Nervous, Tropico and Wide Awake in Dreamland

== Singles ==
Year	Single	Peak chart positions									Certifications	Album
Year	Single	US	US Main.	AUS	BEL (FL)	CAN	NED	NZ	SWI	UK	Certifications	Album
1974	"Day Gig" b/w "Last Saturday"	—	—	—	—	—	—	—	—	—		Non-album single
1979	"I Need a Lover"	—	—	—	24	—	31	—	—	—		In the Heat of the Night
1979	"If You Think You Know How to Love Me"	—	—	—	—	—	—	—	—	—		In the Heat of the Night
1979	"Heartbreaker"	23	—	95	—	18	—	14	—	— (Note: "Heartbreaker" did not enter the official UK singles chart, but reached number 94 on the Record Business chart.)		In the Heat of the Night
1980	"We Live for Love"	27	—	28	—	8	—	26	—	— (Note: "We Live for Love" did not enter the official UK singles chart, but reached number 115 on the Record Business chart.)		In the Heat of the Night
1980	"Rated X"	—	—	—	—	—	—	—	—	—		In the Heat of the Night
1980	"I'm Gonna Follow You"	—	—	—	—	—	—	—	—	—		Crimes of Passion
1980	"You Better Run"	42	—	31	—	76	—	42	—	—		Crimes of Passion
1980	"Hit Me with Your Best Shot"	9	—	33	—	10	—	—	—	— (Note: "Hit Me with Your Best Shot" did not enter the official UK singles chart, but reached number 112 on the Record Business chart.)	RIAA: Gold; BPI: Gold	Crimes of Passion
1980	"Treat Me Right"	18	31	—	—	12	—	—	—	—		Crimes of Passion
1981	"Fire and Ice"	17	2	30	—	4	—	22	—	— (Note: "Fire and Ice" did not enter the official UK singles chart, but reached number 59 on the Record Business chart.)		Precious Time
1981	"Promises in the Dark"	38	16	—	—	31	—	—	—	—		Precious Time
1982	"Shadows of the Night"	13	3	29	—	12	—	32	—	83		Get Nervous
1983	"Little Too Late"	20	38	—	—	—	—	—	—	—		Get Nervous
1983	"Looking for a Stranger"	39	4	—	—	—	—	—	—	—		Get Nervous
1983	"Anxiety (Get Nervous)"	—	—	—	—	—	—	—	—	—		Get Nervous
1983	"Love Is a Battlefield"	5	1	1	1	2	1	6	11	49	RIAA: Gold; BPI: Silver; MC: Gold	Live from Earth
1983	"Lipstick Lies"	—	—	—	—	—	—	—	—	—		Live from Earth
1984	"We Belong"	5 (Note: "We Belong" also peaked at number 34 on the Billboard Adult Contemporary chart.)	3	7	16	8	13	7	5	22	MC: Gold	Tropico
1984	"Painted Desert"	—	—	—	—	—	—	—	—	—		Tropico
1985	"Ooh Ooh Song"	36	22	78	—	89	—	41	—	—		Tropico
1985	"Temporary Heroes"	—	—	—	—	—	—	—	—	—		Tropico
1985	"Love Is a Battlefield" (re-release)	—	—	—	—	—	—	—	—	17		Tropico
1985	"Shadows of the Night" (re-release)	—	—	—	—	—	—	—	—	50		Get Nervous
1985	"Invincible"	10	4	23	9	6	18	15	—	53		Seven the Hard Way
1985	"Sex as a Weapon"	28	5	33	—	30	—	26	—	67		Seven the Hard Way
1986	"Le Bel Age"	54	19	86	—	92	—	—	—	—		Seven the Hard Way
1988	"All Fired Up"	19	2	2	—	19	—	20	—	19		Wide Awake in Dreamland
1988	"Don't Walk Away"	—	44	61	—	63	—	48	—	42		Wide Awake in Dreamland
1988	"Let's Stay Together"	—	—	—	—	—	—	—	—	—		Wide Awake in Dreamland
1989	"One Love"	—	—	166	—	—	—	—	—	59		Wide Awake in Dreamland
1991	"True Love"	—	—	107	—	—	21	—	—	95		True Love
1991	"Payin' the Cost to Be the Boss"	—	17	—	—	—	—	—	—	—		True Love
1991	"So Long"	—	—	—	—	—	—	—	—	—		True Love
1993	"Somebody's Baby"	—	—	90	—	41	—	36	—	48		Gravity's Rainbow
1993	"Everybody Lay Down"	—	3	—	—	50	—	—	—	—		Gravity's Rainbow
1993	"Crazy"	—	—	—	—	—	—	—	—	—		Gravity's Rainbow
1997	"Strawberry Wine (Life Is Sweet)"	—	—	—	—	—	—	—	—	—		Innamorata
1997	"At This Time"	—	—	—	—	—	—	—	—	—		Innamorata
1997	"Papa's Roses"	—	—	—	—	—	—	—	—	—		Innamorata
2003	"Have It All"	—	—	—	—	—	—	—	—	—		Go
2003	"Go"	—	—	—	—	—	—	—	—	—		Go
2003	"Sorry"	—	—	—	—	—	—	—	—	—		Go
2015	"Promises in the Dark" (live)	—	—	—	—	—	—	—	—	—		35th Anniversary Tour (Live)
2015	"One December Night"	—	—	—	—	—	—	—	—	—		Non-album singles
2017	"Shine"	—	—	—	—	—	—	—	—	—		Non-album singles
2017	"Dancing Through the Wreckage"	— (Note: "Dancing Through the Wreckage" did not enter the Billboard Hot 100, but peaked at number 22 on the Billboard Adult Contemporary chart.)	—	—	—	—	—	—	—	—		Served Like a Girl Soundtrack
2020	"Together"	—	—	—	—	—	—	—	—	—		Non-album single
"—" denotes releases that did not chart.

== Other charted songs, B-sides, soundtracks ==
Year	Song	Peak positions		Album
Year	Song	US AC	US Main	Album
1981	"Take It Anyway You Want It"	—	32	Precious Time
1981	"Just Like Me"	—	15	Precious Time
1982	"The Victim"	—	23	Get Nervous
1984	"Here's My Heart"	—	—	Metropolis Soundtrack
1984	"Diamond Field"	—	20	Tropico
1987	"Sometimes the Good Guys Finish First"	—	—	The Secret of My Success: Music from the Motion Picture Soundtrack
1988	"Jimmy Says"	—	—	Free to Be a Family
1993	"Temptation"	—	—	B-side of "Somebody's Baby"
1997	"Cry for Love"	—	—	Promo single; B-side of "Strawberry Wine (Life Is Sweet)"
1998	"Love Is a Battlefield" (with Queen Latifah)	—	—	Small Soldiers Soundtrack
2001	"Christmas in America"	22	—	Go
2000	"Future's So Bright I Gotta Wear Shades"	—	—	Disney's An Extremely Goofy Movie Dance Party!
2013	"Passion"	—	—	Jello Fruit commercial

== Video releases ==
Title	Details	Notes
Hit Videos	Released: 1984; Label: RCA/Columbia Pictures (VHS/Betmax) / Pioneer Artists (Laserdisc); Formats: VHS (60353), Betamax (BE 91097), Laserdisc (PA-85-M028)	Includes music videos for "Anxiety (Get Nervous)", "Lipstick Lies", "Shadows of the Night" and "Love Is a Battlefield", as well as a "making-of" feature for "Love Is a Battlefield".
In Concert	Released: 1985; Label: RCA/Columbia Pictures (VHS) / Pioneer Artists (Laserdisc); Formats: VHS (60305), Laserdisc (PA-85-090)	Recorded live at New Haven Coliseum in 1982. Includes music video for "Love is a Battlefield" (1985 release only). Re-issued by Rhino Entertainment on VHS and DVD in 1998 and 1999 under the title of Live in New Haven.
The Visual Music Collection	Released: 1986; Label: Chrysalis/Vestron MusicVideo Inc.; Formats: VHS (1073), Laserdisc (ML1073)	Includes 12 music videos. Released as Best Shots in Europe in 1987.
Choice Cuts – The Complete Video Collection	Released: 2003; Label: Capitol Records; Formats: DVD (72434-90696-9-5)	Includes 25 music videos, 4 live performances, artist commentary and 1 hidden 'making-of' feature for "Love Is a Battlefield". DVD sales of 10,000+ in the United States.
Live on Air	Released: May 19, 2008; Label: Ragnarock Films Distribution; Formats: DVD (CRP2782)	2 live performances from the US comedy show Fridays in 1980 and 15 live performances from the US Festival in 1982.
We Live for Love (with Neil Giraldo)	Released: December 7, 2017; Label: Mailboat Records; Formats: DVD (MBDVD 8511)	10 acoustic live performances recorded at Red Studios, Hollywood.

== Music videos ==
Year	Video	Information
1975	"Coxon's Army"	Unreleased PBS special
1980	"You Better Run"	Second video shown on MTV
1980	"I'm Gonna Follow You"	
1981	"Fire and Ice"	Directed by Keith McMillan
1981	"Promises in the Dark"	Directed by Keith McMillan
1981	"Precious Time"	
1982	"Shadows of the Night"	
1982	"Anxiety (Get Nervous)"	
1982	"Little Too Late"	
1983	"Love Is a Battlefield"	Nominated for MTV Video Music Award for Best Female Video
1983	"Lipstick Lies"	
1983	"Rappin' Rodney"	Guest star; Rodney Dangerfield video
1984	"Painted Desert"	Unreleased until 1986
1984	"We Belong"	
1984	"Ooh Ooh Song"	
1985	"Invincible"	Theme from The Legend of Billie Jean
1985	"Sex as a Weapon"	Nominated for MTV Video Music Award for Most Experimental Video
1985	"Le Bel Age"	Two versions, one with Richard Belzer
1985	"Sun City"	Guest star; Artists United Against Apartheid video
1988	"All Fired Up"	
1988	"Don't Walk Away"	
1988	"Let's Stay Together"	
1989	"One Love"	Released for Best Shots
1991	"True Love"	
1991	"So Long"	
1991	"Yakety Yak, Take it Back"	Guest star; charity single
1993	"Somebody's Baby"	
1993	"Everytime I Fall Back"	Unreleased
1997	"Strawberry Wine"	
2001	"Christmas in America"	
2003	"Have It All"	Unreleased compilation video
2015	"Promises in the Dark"	Live video from 35th Anniversary Tour (Live)
2015	"Love Is a Battlefield"	Live video from 35th Anniversary Tour (Live)
2017	"Shine"	In support of the Shine Together Movement
2017	"Dancing Through the Wreckage"	From Served Like a Girl Soundtrack
2020	"Together"	COVID-themed video
