= Ultimate Collection (Pat Benatar album) =

Compilation album by Pat Benatar
- Released: June 2008
- Recorded: 1979–1993
- Genre: Rock; hard rock; pop rock
- Length: 76:26 (disc one); 75:31 (disc two)
- Label: Capitol/EMI

Pat Benatar chronology
Greatest Hits (2005)	Ultimate Collection (2008)	10 Great Songs (2009)

Professional ratings
Review scores
Source	Rating
AllMusic	4/5 stars

Ultimate Collection is a compilation album by American singer Pat Benatar, released in 2008. The two-CD collection features 40 songs, including 20 top 40 chart hit singles. The album only contains material that Benatar released under Chrysalis Records, material from her most recent studio albums: Innamorata (1997) and Go (2003), released prior to this compilation's release are excluded.

Benatar toured more than 40 cities across North America in 2008 in support of the release, performing her top hits and fan favorites.

== Track listing ==
Disc one
No.	Title	Writer(s)	Original album	Length
1.	"Heartbreaker"	Geoff Gill, Cliff Wade	In the Heat of the Night (1979)	3:27
2.	"I Need a Lover"	John Mellencamp	In the Heat of the Night	3:27
3.	"In the Heat of the Night"	Mike Chapman, Nicky Chinn	In the Heat of the Night	5:22
4.	"We Live for Love" (edited version)	Neil Giraldo	In the Heat of the Night	3:34
5.	"Treat Me Right" (single edit)	Doug Lubahn	Crimes of Passion (1980)	3:12
6.	"You Better Run"	Eddie Brigati, Felix Cavaliere	Crimes of Passion	3:03
7.	"Never Wanna Leave You"	Pat Benatar, Giraldo	Crimes of Passion	3:10
8.	"Hit Me with Your Best Shot"	Eddie Schwartz	Crimes of Passion	2:50
9.	"Hell Is for Children"	Benatar, Roger Capps, Giraldo	Crimes of Passion	4:50
10.	"Promises in the Dark"	Benatar, Giraldo	Precious Time (1981)	4:11
11.	"Fire and Ice"	Benatar, Tom Kelly, Scott St. Clair Sheets	Precious Time	3:18
12.	"Just Like Me"	Rick Dey, Roger Hart	Precious Time	3:30
13.	"It's a Tuff Life"	Giraldo	Precious Time	3:16
14.	"Precious Time"	Billy Steinberg	Precious Time	6:02
15.	"Shadows of the Night" (edited version)	D.L. Byron	Get Nervous (1982)	3:41
16.	"Looking for a Stranger"	Franne Golde, Peter McIan	Get Nervous	3:25
17.	"Anxiety (Get Nervous)"	Giraldo, Steinberg	Get Nervous	3:41
18.	"Little Too Late" (edited version)	Alex Call	Get Nervous	3:35
19.	"The Victim"	Giraldo, Steinberg	Get Nervous	4:41
20.	"Lipstick Lies" (edited version)	Giraldo, Myron Grombacher	Live from Earth (1983)	3:32
21.	"Love Is a Battlefield" (edited version)	Mike Chapman, Holly Knight	Live from Earth	4:09
Total length:				76:26

Disc two
No.	Title	Writer(s)	Original album	Length
1.	"Diamond Field"	Benatar, Giraldo, Grombacher	Tropico (1984)	3:21
2.	"We Belong"	Eric Lowen, Dan Navarro	Tropico	3:41
3.	"Ooh Ooh Song" (single edit)	Benatar, Giraldo	Tropico	4:08
4.	"The Outlaw Blues"	Giraldo, Grombacher	Tropico	3:46
5.	"Painted Desert"	Giraldo, Grombacher	Tropico	5:23
6.	"Invincible (Theme from The Legend of Billie Jean)" (vocal edit)	Simon Climie, Knight	Seven the Hard Way (1985)	4:08
7.	"Sex as a Weapon"	Kelly, Steinberg	Seven the Hard Way	4:19
8.	"Le Bel Age" (edited version)	Guy Marshall, Robert Tepper	Seven the Hard Way	4:18
9.	"All Fired Up" (single version)	Kerryn Tolhurst	Wide Awake in Dreamland (1988)	4:10
10.	"Don't Walk Away" (radio edit)	Nick Gilder, Duane Hitchings	Wide Awake in Dreamland	4:08
11.	"One Love (Song of the Lion)" (edited version)	Giraldo, Grombacher	Wide Awake in Dreamland	4:30
12.	"Let's Stay Together" (edited version)	Benatar, Giraldo	Wide Awake in Dreamland	4:43
13.	"Payin' the Cost to Be the Boss"	B.B. King	True Love (1991)	3:13
14.	"True Love"	Benatar, Giraldo	True Love	4:41
15.	"I Feel Lucky"	Giraldo, Grombacher	True Love	4:29
16.	"The Good Life"	Giraldo, Grombacher	True Love	4:10
17.	"Everybody Lay Down" (edited version)	Benatar, Giraldo	Gravity's Rainbow (1993)	3:56
18.	"Somebody's Baby" (edited version)	Benatar, Giraldo	Gravity's Rainbow	3:49
19.	"Every Time I Fall Back"	Benatar, Giraldo	Gravity's Rainbow	4:59
Total length:				75:31

== Personnel ==
- Evren Göknar – mastering engineer
