= Greatest Hits (Pat Benatar album) =

Greatest hits album by Pat Benatar
- Released: June 7, 2005
- Length: 79:48
- Label: Capitol
- Producer: Peter Coleman; Keith Olsen; Neil Giraldo; Mike Chapman; Keith Forsey

Pat Benatar chronology
Go (2003)	Greatest Hits (2005)	Ultimate Collection (2008)

Professional ratings
Review scores
Source	Rating
AllMusic	4.5/5 stars

Greatest Hits is a compilation album by Pat Benatar, released in June 2005 by Capitol Records. The album contains 20 digitally remastered tracks from Benatar's first seven studio albums, including the studio recording "Love Is a Battlefield" from the 1983 live album Live from Earth. The compilation peaked at No. 47, lasting 15 weeks on the Billboard 200 album chart.

== Track listing ==
No.	Title	Writer(s)	Original album	Length
1.	"Heartbreaker" (single mix)	Geoff Gill, Cliff Wade	In the Heat of the Night (1979)	3:28
2.	"We Live for Love" (single edit)	Neil Giraldo	In the Heat of the Night	3:55
3.	"Hit Me with Your Best Shot"	Eddie Schwartz	Crimes of Passion (1980)	2:52
4.	"Hell Is for Children"	Pat Benatar, Roger Capps, Giraldo	Crimes of Passion	4:52
5.	"Treat Me Right" (single edit)	Doug Lubahn, Benatar	Crimes of Passion	3:14
6.	"You Better Run"	Eddie Brigati, Felix Cavaliere	Crimes of Passion	3:05
7.	"Fire and Ice"	Benatar, Tom Kelly, Scott St. Clair Sheets	Precious Time (1981)	3:20
8.	"Promises in the Dark"	Benatar, Giraldo	Precious Time	4:49
9.	"Precious Time"	Billy Steinberg	Precious Time	6:02
10.	"Shadows of the Night" (single edit)	D.L. Byron	Get Nervous (1982)	3:43
11.	"Little Too Late" (single edit)	Alex Call	Get Nervous	3:27
12.	"Looking for a Stranger"	Franne Golde, Peter McIan	Get Nervous	3:27
13.	"Love Is a Battlefield" (single edit)	Mike Chapman, Holly Knight	Live from Earth (1983)	4:10
14.	"We Belong"	Eric Lowen, Dan Navarro	Tropico (1984)	3:42
15.	"Ooh Ooh Song" (single edit)	Benatar, Giraldo	Tropico	4:09
16.	"Invincible (Theme from The Legend of Billie Jean)" (single edit)	Simon Climie, Knight	Seven the Hard Way (1985)	4:10
17.	"Sex as a Weapon"	Kelly, Steinberg	Seven the Hard Way	4:20
18.	"Le Bel Age" (single edit)	Guy Marshall, Robert Tepper	Seven the Hard Way	4:20
19.	"All Fired Up" (single edit)	Kerryn Tolhurst	Wide Awake in Dreamland (1988)	4:12
20.	"One Love (Song of the Lion)" (single edit)	Giraldo, Myron Grombacher	Wide Awake in Dreamland	4:31

== Personnel ==
- Evren Göknar - Mastering Engineer

== Charts ==
Chart (2005)	Peak position
US Billboard 200	47

Chart (2013)	Peak position
Official New Zealand Music Chart	26

== Certifications ==
Certifications for Greatest Hits
Region	Certification	Certified units/sales
United Kingdom (BPI)	Silver	60,000^{‡}
^{‡} Sales+streaming figures based on certification alone.
