= Synchronistic Wanderings =

Box set by Pat Benatar
- Released: October 5, 1999
- Recorded: 1979–1999
- Length: 225:01
- Label: Chrysalis
- Producer: Neil Giraldo; Peter Coleman; Keith Olsen; Mike Chapman; Don Gehman

Pat Benatar chronology
Innamorata (1997)	Synchronistic Wanderings (1999)	Go (2003)

Professional ratings
Review scores
Source	Rating
AllMusic	3/5 stars

Synchronistic Wanderings is a compilation album by American rock singer Pat Benatar. Spanning three discs, it is a box set chronicling her career from 1979 to 1999. Included are soundtrack contributions, B-sides, studio outtakes, previously unreleased songs, and rarities, as well as well-known singles. The accompanying booklet chronicles her career, discussing her ups and downs and giving additional commentary and background on most of the included songs from Benatar and husband Neil Giraldo.

Among the previously unreleased tracks are a cover of Roy Orbison's "Crying", a demo of "Love Is a Battlefield", a live version of "I Need a Lover", part 1 of "Rise" (from her 1993 album Gravity's Rainbow), a live performance of "Run Between the Raindrops" (from Seven the Hard Way), and a remix of "Every Time I Fall Back" (also from Gravity's Rainbow).

== Track listing ==
Disc one
No.	Title	Writer(s)	Origin	Length
1.	"Heartbreaker"	Geoff Gill, Cliff Wade	In the Heat of the Night (1979)	3:28
2.	"We Live for Love"	Neil Giraldo	In the Heat of the Night	3:55
3.	"My Clone Sleeps Alone"	Roger Capps, Pat Benatar	In the Heat of the Night	3:29
4.	"I Need a Lover" (Live from The Bottom Line, New York City, 11/13/1979)	John Mellencamp	Previously unreleased live version (album version from In the Heat of the Night)	4:27
5.	"In the Heat of the Night"	Nicky Chinn, Mike Chapman	In the Heat of the Night	5:24
6.	"You Better Run"	Felix Cavaliere, Eddie Brigati	Crimes of Passion (1980)	3:06
7.	"Hit Me with Your Best Shot"	Eddie Schwartz	Crimes of Passion	2:51
8.	"Treat Me Right"	Doug Lubahn	Crimes of Passion	3:26
9.	"Wuthering Heights"	Kate Bush	Crimes of Passion	4:30
10.	"Hell Is for Children"	Giraldo, Benatar, Capps	Crimes of Passion	4:51
11.	"Fire and Ice"	Scott St. Clair Sheets, Tom Kelly, Benatar	Precious Time (1981)	3:20
12.	"Promises in the Dark"	Giraldo, Benatar	Precious Time	4:48
13.	"Precious Time"	Billy Steinberg	Precious Time	6:02
14.	"Shadows of the Night"	D.L. Byron, Benatar, Myron Grombacher	Get Nervous (1982)	4:20
15.	"Little Too Late"	Alex Call	Get Nervous	4:08
16.	"Looking for a Stranger"	Peter McIan, Franne Golde	Get Nervous	3:26
17.	"Anxiety (Get Nervous)"	Giraldo, Steinberg	Get Nervous	3:43
18.	"Love Is a Battlefield" (Demo version)	Chapman, Holly Knight	Previously unreleased demo version (album version from Live from Earth (1983))	5:34

Disc two
No.	Title	Writer(s)	Origin	Length
1.	"Love Is a Battlefield"	Chapman, Knight	Live from Earth	5:23
2.	"Ooh Ooh Song"	Giraldo, Benatar	Tropico (1984)	4:09
3.	"We Belong"	Eric Lowen, Dan Navarro	Tropico	3:42
4.	"Painted Desert"	Giraldo, Grombacher	Tropico	5:26
5.	"Outlaw Blues"	Giraldo, Grombacher	Tropico	3:48
6.	"Invincible" (Theme from The Legend of Billie Jean)	Simon Climie, Knight	Seven the Hard Way (1985)	4:29
7.	"Sex as a Weapon"	Kelly, Steinberg	Seven the Hard Way	4:21
8.	"Le Bel Age"	Robert Tepper, Guy Gaglio	Seven the Hard Way	5:11
9.	"New Dream Islands" (Session outtake)	Giraldo, Grombacher	Previously unreleased (recorded 1986)	3:35
10.	"Run Between the Raindrops" (Live from Philadelphia, PA, 11/10/1988)	Giraldo, Grombacher	Previously unreleased live version (album version from Seven the Hard Way)	4:46
11.	"One Love (Song of the Lion)"	Giraldo, Grombacher	Wide Awake in Dreamland (1988)	5:13
12.	"True Hearts" (Session outtake)	Giraldo, Grombacher	Previously unreleased (outtake from Wide Awake in Dreamland)	4:26
13.	"Let's Stay Together"	Benatar, Giraldo	Wide Awake in Dreamland	4:42
14.	"All Fired Up"	Kerryn Tolhurst, Benatar, Grombacher	Wide Awake in Dreamland	4:30
15.	"Shooting Star" (Live at the Harry Chapin Tribute Concert)	Harry Chapin	Harry Chapin Tribute (recorded 1987, released 1990)	5:47
16.	"La Cancion Ooh Ooh" (Spanish version of "Ooh Ooh Song")	Giraldo, Benatar	"Ooh Ooh Song" 7″ single (USA, Japan & Peru), "Painted Desert" 12″ single (Europe)	5:08

Disc three
No.	Title	Writer(s)	Origin	Length
1.	"Payin' the Cost to Be the Boss"	B. B. King	True Love (1991)	3:14
2.	"True Love"	Giraldo, Benatar	True Love	4:42
3.	"The Good Life"	Giraldo, Grombacher	True Love	4:11
4.	"I Feel Lucky"	Giraldo, Grombacher	True Love	4:30
5.	"Please Come Home for Christmas"	Gene Redd, Charles Brown	True Love (CD edition)	3:06
6.	"Tell Me Why"	Traditional, arranged by Benatar, Giraldo	For Our Children (Benefit for Pediatric AIDS Foundation, released 1991)	2:15
7.	"Crying" (session outtake)	Roy Orbison, Joe Melson	Previously unreleased (outtake from In the Heat of the Night)	4:27
8.	"Sometimes the Good Guys Finish First"	Benatar, Knight, Chris McDaniels	The Secret of My Success soundtrack (1987)	4:26
9.	"Somebody's Baby"	Benatar, Giraldo	Gravity's Rainbow (1993)	4:24
10.	"Everybody Lay Down"	Benatar, Giraldo	Gravity's Rainbow	4:27
11.	"Rise" (Part 2)	Benatar, Giraldo, Grombacher, Frank Linx	Gravity's Rainbow	3:04
12.	"Rise" (Part 1)	Benatar, Giraldo, Grombacher, Linx	Previously unreleased version	3:34
13.	"Temptation"	Benatar, Giraldo, Grombacher	B-side of "Somebody's Baby"	3:32
14.	"Every Time I Fall Back" (Remix)	Benatar, Giraldo	Previously unreleased remixed version (original version from Gravity's Rainbow)	5:01
15.	"The Effect You Have on Me"	Édith Piaf, Marc Heyral, adapted by Claire Severac, Susanne Edgren	Édith Piaf Tribute (1993)	3:18
16.	"Rescue Me"	Carl Smith, Raynard Miner	Speed (Songs from and Inspired by the Motion Picture) (1994)	2:59
17.	"Strawberry Wine"	Benatar, Giraldo	Innamorata (1997)	5:53
18.	"I Don't Want to be Your Friend"	Benatar, Giraldo	Innamorata	5:08
19.	"Here's My Heart"	Giorgio Moroder, Pete Bellotte	Metropolis (Original Motion Picture Soundtrack) (1984 re-release)	4:54

== Personnel ==
- Evren Göknar - mastering engineer
- David Tedds - catalog producer
