= Best Shots =

Greatest hits album by Pat Benatar
- Released: October 26, 1987
- Recorded: 1979–1988
- Genre: Rock
- Length: 43:55
- Label: Chrysalis
- Producer: Neil Giraldo; Peter Coleman; Keith Olsen; Mike Chapman

Pat Benatar chronology
Seven the Hard Way (1985)	Best Shots (1987)	Wide Awake in Dreamland (1988)

US edition cover

Professional ratings
Review scores
Source	Rating
AllMusic	4.5/5 stars
Christgau's Record Guide	C
New Musical Express	7/10

Best Shots is a Platinum-certified greatest hits album released by the American rock singer Pat Benatar in 1987 in Europe and in an updated version in 1989 in North America. It peaked at No. 67 on the U.S. Billboard 200 album chart, two years after the album peaked at No. 6 in the UK, where it remains her highest-charting and best-selling album.

== Track listings ==
=== European version ===
Side one
No.	Title	Writer(s)	Original album	Length
1.	"Hit Me with Your Best Shot" (single version)	Eddie Schwartz	Crimes of Passion (1980)	2:51
2.	"Love Is a Battlefield" (single version)	Mike Chapman, Holly Knight	Live from Earth (1983)	4:12
3.	"We Belong" (single version)	Eric Lowen, Dan Navarro	Tropico (1984)	3:42
4.	"We Live for Love" (remixed version)	Neil Giraldo	In the Heat of the Night (1979)	3:58
5.	"Sex as a Weapon"	Tom Kelly, Billy Steinberg	Seven the Hard Way (1985)	4:19
6.	"Invincible" (Theme from The Legend of Billie Jean) (single version)	Simon Climie, Knight	Seven the Hard Way	4:04

Side two
No.	Title	Writer(s)	Original album	Length
7.	"Shadows of the Night" (single version)	D. L. Byron	Get Nervous (1982)	3:42
8.	"Heartbreaker"	Geoff Gill, Clint Wade	In the Heat of the Night	3:28
9.	"Fire and Ice"	Kelly, Scott St. Clair Sheets, Pat Benatar	Precious Time (1981)	3:20
10.	"Treat Me Right"	Doug Lubahn	Crimes of Passion	3:28
11.	"If You Think You Know How to Love Me" (single version)	Chapman, Nicky Chinn	In the Heat of the Night	3:47
12.	"You Better Run"	Eddie Brigati, Felix Cavaliere	Crimes of Passion	3:04

=== U.S. version ===
No.	Title	Writer(s)	Original album	Length
1.	"Love Is a Battlefield"		Live from Earth	5:24
2.	"Promises in the Dark"	Giraldo, Benatar	Precious Time	4:48
3.	"One Love"	Giraldo, Myron Grombacher	Wide Awake in Dreamland (1988)	5:12
4.	"All Fired Up"	Kerryn Tolhurst, Grombacher, Benatar	Wide Awake in Dreamland	4:27
5.	"We Live for Love"		In the Heat of the Night	3:55
6.	"Hell Is for Children"	Giraldo, Benatar, Roger Capps	Crimes of Passion	4:48
7.	"Shadows of the Night"		Get Nervous	4:20
8.	"Hit Me with Your Best Shot"		Crimes of Passion	2:51
9.	"We Belong"		Tropico	3:40
10.	"Invincible"		Seven the Hard Way	4:28
11.	"Fire and Ice"		Precious Time	3:20
12.	"Heartbreaker"		In the Heat of the Night	3:26
13.	"Medley: Suffer the Little Children / Hell Is for Children" (live 1988, CD edition bonus track)	Giraldo, Benatar	previously unreleased	6:45
14.	"Painted Desert" (CD edition bonus track)	Giraldo, Grombacher	Tropico	5:24
15.	"Outlaw Blues" (1989 re-recording, CD edition bonus track)	Giraldo, Grombacher	Tropico	4:19
Total length:				67:07

== Charts ==
=== Weekly charts ===
Weekly chart performance for Best Shots
Chart (1987–1989)	Peak position
European Albums (Music & Media)	52
New Zealand Albums (RMNZ)	5
UK Albums (OCC)	6
US Billboard 200	67

=== Year-end charts ===
Year-end chart performance for Best Shots
Chart (1987)	Position
UK Albums (Gallup)	61

== Certifications ==
Region	Certification	Certified units/sales
New Zealand (RMNZ)	Platinum	15,000^{^}
United Kingdom (BPI)	Platinum	300,000^{^}
United States (RIAA)	Platinum	1,000,000^{^}
^{^} Shipments figures based on certification alone.
