= Strawberry Wine =

Strawberry Wine may refer to:

- A fruit wine made from strawberries
- "Strawberry Wine" (Deana Carter song), 1996
- "Strawberry Wine" (My Bloody Valentine song), 1987
- "Strawberry Wine", a song by The Band from the 1970 album Stage Fright
- "Strawberry Wine", a song by Ryan Adams from the 2005 album 29
- "Strawberry Wine (Life Is Sweet)", a song by Pat Benatar from the 1997 album Innamorata
- "Strawberry Wine", a song by Noah Kahan from the 2022 album Stick Season
- Strawberry Wine, a 1966 jazz album by Mike Wofford
