= Charles Giordano =

American keyboardist and accordionist

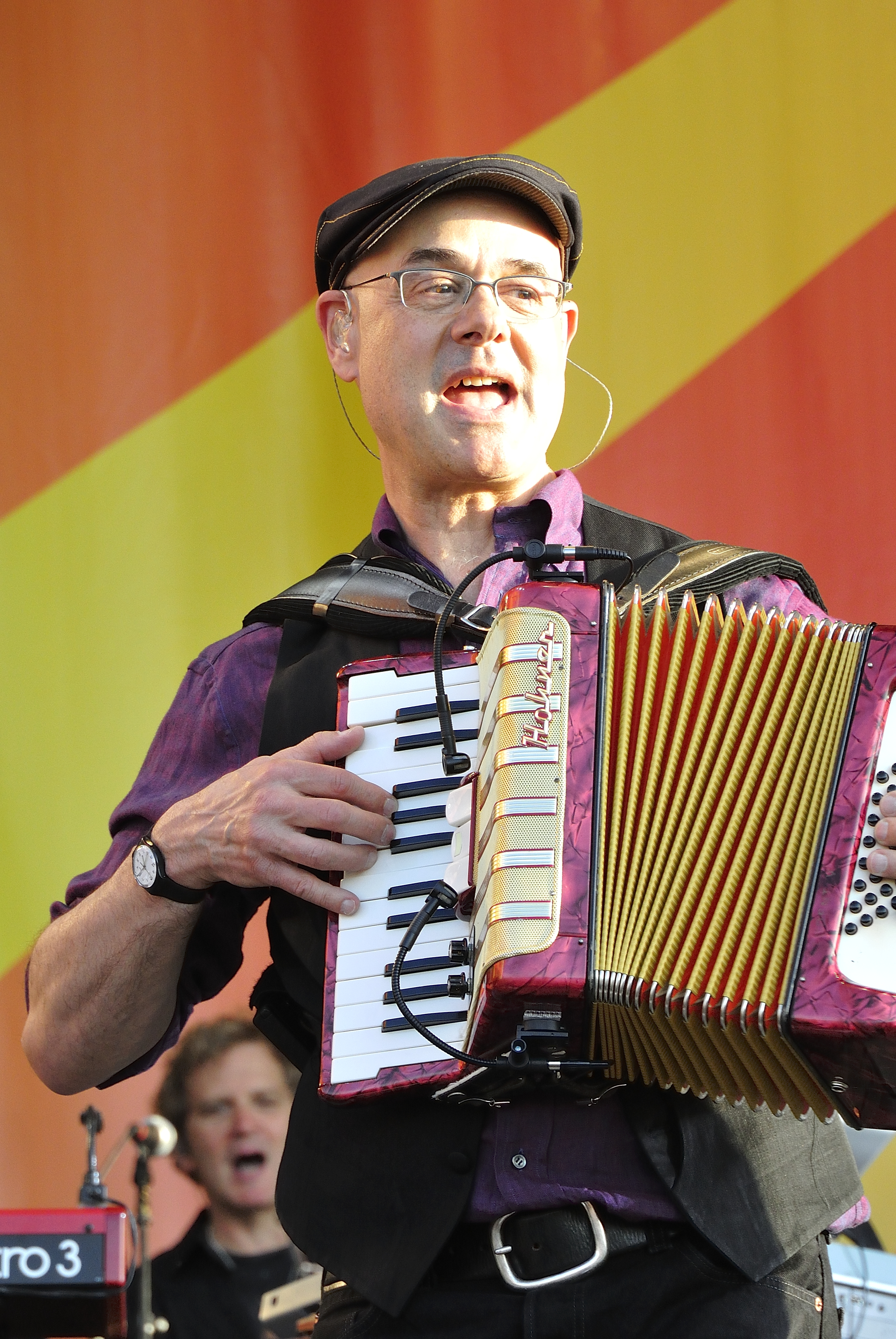
- Charles Giordano at the 2012 New Orleans Jazz & Heritage Festival

Background information
- Born: October 13, 1954 (age 71); Brooklyn, New York, U.S.
- Genres: Rock; blues; folk
- Occupation: Musician
- Instruments: Keyboards; accordion
- Years active: 1982–present

Charles Giordano (born October 13, 1954) is an American keyboardist and accordionist. Giordano is known primarily for his work with Bruce Springsteen as a member of the E Street Band, replacing Danny Federici as the band's organist following the latter's serious illness and death in 2008 and as a member of Springsteen's The Sessions Band. He is also known for playing keyboards with Pat Benatar in the 1980s.

Giordano also played with The Bacon Brothers, for a number of years.

With Benatar he was usually billed as Charlie Giordano and played for five albums, beginning in 1983; his role in the band was praised by Billboard magazine. With Benatar he was identifiable by his glasses and distinctive array of berets, blazers and 1980s-style ties. Giordano also was a member of The David Johansen Group and went on to perform with Buster Poindexter and The Banshees of Blue.

As a session musician Giordano's playing has included Madeleine Peyroux's 1996 album Dreamland and Bucky Pizzarelli's 2000 album Italian Intermezzo; the latter's mix of opera, Italian folk, and swing presaged his appearance in the similarly genre-mashing Sessions Band Tour with Springsteen. Giordano also participated in a 2002 revival of garage rock band ? and the Mysterians. In 2008, he accompanied British singer Barb Jungr for a short stand in a New York City cabaret.

== Tours with Bruce Springsteen ==
- Seeger Sessions Tour with the Sessions Band (2006)
- Magic Tour with the E Street Band (2007–2008)
- Working On A Dream Tour with the E Street Band (2009)
- Wrecking Ball Tour with the E Street Band (2012–2013)
- High Hopes Tour with the E Street Band (2014)
- The River Tour 2016–Summer '17 with the E Street Band (2016–17)
- Springsteen and E Street Band 2023 Tour with the E Street Band (2023-24)

== Discography ==
With James Carter

- Chasin' the Gypsy (Atlantic, 2000)

With Bruce Springsteen

- We Shall Overcome: The Seeger Sessions (2006)
- Bruce Springsteen with The Sessions Band: Live in Dublin (2007)
- Magic Tour Highlights (2008)
- London Calling: Live in Hyde Park (2010)
- Live from the Carousel (2011)
- Wrecking Ball (2012)
- High Hopes (2014)
- American Beauty (2014)
- Western Stars (2019)
- Western Stars: Songs From The Film (2019)
- Letter to You (2020)

With Pat Benatar

- Get Nervous (1982)
- Live from Earth (1983)
- Tropico (1984)
- Seven the Hard Way (1985)
- Wide Awake in Dreamland (1988)
- True Love (1991)
