= Go (Pat Benatar album) =

Studio album by Pat Benatar
- Released: August 12, 2003
- Recorded: 2002–2003
- Studio: Spyder's Soul Kitchen (Los Angeles); Rumbo (Los Angeles)
- Genre: Rock
- Length: 52:34
- Label: Bel Chiasso
- Producer: Neil Giraldo

Pat Benatar chronology
Synchronistic Wanderings (1999)	Go (2003)	Greatest Hits (2005)

Professional ratings
Review scores
Source	Rating
AllMusic	2/5 stars

Go is the eleventh studio album, and twelfth album overall, by American rock singer Pat Benatar, released in August 12, 2003. Her first release since Innamorata (1997), it stands as her most recent album to date (though she has released singles periodically) and her only album not available for digital purchase on music streaming platforms as of 2026.

== Track listing ==
All songs written by Pat Benatar and Neil Giraldo, except as noted.

1. "Go" - 3:54
2. "Brave" - 4:33
3. "I Won't" - 4:43
4. "Have It All" - 4:31
5. "Sorry" (Benatar, Giraldo, Paul Rafferty) - 5:28
6. "Please Don't Leave Me" - 5:26
7. "Girl" (Giraldo, Holly Knight) - 4:51
8. "Out of the Ruins" - 2:47
9. "In My Dreams" - 5:52
10. "Tell Me" - 4:44
11. "Brokenhearted" - 5:45

== Personnel ==
=== Musicians ===
- Pat Benatar – vocals
- Neil Giraldo – guitars, keyboards, bass, backing vocals, strings arrangements
- Mick Mahan – bass
- Ray Brinker, Denny Fongheiser, Dave Karasony, Matt Laug – drums, percussion

=== Production ===
- Neil Giraldo – producer
- Chris Fuhrman, Spyder Whitehorse – engineers, digital editing
- Barry Rudolph – engineer, mixing
- Jeff Worrell – digital editing
- Steve Hall – mastering

== Charts ==
Chart (2003)	Peak position
US Billboard 200	187
US Independent Albums (Billboard)	9
