= Gravity's Rainbow (album) =

Studio album by Pat Benatar
- Released: June 1, 1993
- Studios: Spyder Mae's Soul Kitchen, Los Angeles, California
- Genre: Rock
- Length: 45:27
- Label: Chrysalis
- Producers: Don Gehman, Neil Giraldo

Pat Benatar chronology
True Love (1991)	Gravity's Rainbow (1993)	Innamorata (1997)

Singles from Gravity's Rainbow
- 1. "Everybody Lay Down" Released: July 21, 1993; 2. "Somebody's Baby" Released: August 30, 1993

Professional ratings
Review scores
Source	Rating
AllMusic	2/5 stars
Kerrang!	3/5 stars
Rolling Stone	3/5 stars

Gravity's Rainbow is the ninth studio album and tenth album overall by American singer Pat Benatar. It was released in 1993 on Chrysalis Records. The album is named after Thomas Pynchon's 1973 novel of the same name, but was not otherwise directly inspired by the novel. It peaked at No. 85 on the US Billboard 200, Gravity's Rainbow would be Benatar's last studio album recorded for Chrysalis.

== Track listing ==
No.	Title	Writer(s)	Length
1.	"Pictures of a Gone World"	Neil Giraldo	0:41
2.	"Everybody Lay Down"	Giraldo, Pat Benatar	4:25
3.	"Somebody's Baby"	Giraldo, Benatar	4:24
4.	"Ties That Bind"	Giraldo, Myron Grombacher	3:36
5.	"You & I"	Giraldo, Benatar, Grombacher	4:24
6.	"Disconnected"	Giraldo, Grombacher, Frank Linx	3:43
7.	"Crazy"	Giraldo, Benatar, Grombacher, Linx	4:24
8.	"Every Time I Fall Back"	Giraldo, Benatar	5:02
9.	"Sanctuary"	Giraldo, Grombacher	3:52
10.	"Rise (Part 2)"	Giraldo, Benatar, Grombacher, Linx	3:03
11.	"Kingdom Key"	Giraldo, Benatar, Grombacher	4:22
12.	"Tradin' Down"	Giraldo, Grombacher	3:31

== Singles ==
=== "Somebody's Baby" ===
- US cassette single, 4 km-24839 / EU cassette single, TC-CHS 5001
1. "Somebody's Baby" (edit) - 3:39
2. "Temptation" (non-LP track) - 3:28
- US CD maxi single, F2-58001
1. "Somebody's Baby" (edit) - 3:39
2. "Somebody's Baby" (a/c mix) - 3:52
3. "Pictures of a Gone World" - 0:41
4. "Everybody Lay Down" (The Dyffernt Mix) - 4:31
5. "Temptation" (non-LP track) - 3:28
6. "Promises in the Dark" (live - 1993) - 5:11
- EU CD single, 0946 3 24902 2 3
1. "Somebody's Baby" (edit) - 3:39
2. "Somebody's Baby" (a/c mix) - 3:52
3. "Somebody's Baby" (album version) - 4:24
4. "Temptation" (non-LP track) - 3:28
- AUS CD single, 880736–2
1. "Somebody's Baby" (album version) - 4:24
2. "Temptation" (non-LP track) - 3:28
3. "Love is a Battlefield" - 4:03
4. "All Fired Up" - 4:27
- UK CD single (CD 1), CDCHSS 5001
1. "Somebody's Baby" (radio edit) - 3:39
2. "Somebody's Baby" (a/c mix) - 3:52
3. "Temptation" (non-LP track) - 3:28
4. "Promises in the Dark" (live - 1993) - 5:11
- UK CD single (CD 2), CDCHS 5001
1. "Somebody's Baby" (radio edit) - 3:39
2. "Love is a Battlefield" - 4:03
3. "We Live for Love" - 3:54
4. "We Belong" (single version) - 3:40
- JPN 3" Mini CD single, TODP-2432 / US CD promo, DPRO-04743
1. "Somebody's Baby" (edit) - 3:39
2. "Somebody's Baby" (a/c mix) - 3:52
3. "Somebody's Baby" (album version) - 4:24
- US 7" Jukebox promo, S7-17490
1. "Somebody's Baby" (album version) - 4:24
2. "Crazy" (album version) - 4:24

=== "Everybody Lay Down" ===
- JPN 3" Mini CD single, TODP-2418 / US CD promo, DPRO-04693
1. "Everybody Lay Down" (edit) - 3:57
2. "Everybody Lay Down" (album version) - 4:25
- US 7" Jukebox promo, S7-17592
1. "Everybody Lay Down" (album version) - 4:25
2. "Promises in the Dark" (live - 1993) - 5:11

=== "Crazy" ===
- US CD Promo, DPRO 04594
1. "Crazy" (edit) - 3:40
2. "Crazy" (album version) - 4:24

== Personnel ==
=== Band members ===
- Pat Benatar – vocals, executive producer
- Neil Giraldo – guitar, keyboards, percussion, executive producer
- Frank Linx – bass, percussion
- Myron Grombacher – drums, percussion

=== Additional musicians ===
- Greg Piccolo – saxophone on "Crazy"
- Richard Dodd – cello on "Somebody's Baby"
- Donte Scher – violin on "Somebody's Baby"

=== Production ===
- Don Gehman – producer, engineer
- Rick Will – engineer, mixing of "Tradin' Down"
- Ed Thacker – mixing
- Danny Alonso – mix assistant
- Sheldon and Nicholas Devane – mixing of "Pictures of a Gone World" and "Rise (Part 2)"
- Stephen Marcussen – mastering

== Weekly charts ==
Year (1993)	Peak position
Australian Albums (ARIA)	130
Canadian Albums (RPM100)	44
US (Billboard 200	85
