= True Love (Pat Benatar album) =

Studio album by Pat Benatar
- Released: April 9, 1991
- Genre: Jump blues
- Length: 36:37
- Label: Chrysalis
- Producer: Neil Giraldo

Pat Benatar chronology
Wide Awake in Dreamland (1988)	True Love (1991)	Gravity's Rainbow (1993)

Singles from True Love
- 1. "True Love" Released: 1991; 2. "So Long" Released: 1991 (EU)

True Love is the eighth studio album, and ninth album overall, by American singer Pat Benatar, released on April 9, 1991. The album is a combination of covers and original tracks of jump blues, which Benatar recorded with husband Neil Giraldo, Myron Grombacher and the Roomful of Blues horn section and drummer. The CD edition of the album included the seasonal standard "Please Come Home for Christmas" as a bonus track, which was released to US troops serving in the Gulf War, and was not included on foreign vinyl and cassette pressings of the album.

True Love was poorly received by critics, but reached No. 37 on the U.S. Billboard albums chart in May 1991.

Benatar was the May artist of the month for VH-1 in 1991 in support of the album.

== Critical reception ==
Professional ratings
Review scores
Source	Rating
AllMusic	2/5 stars
The Encyclopedia of Popular Music	2/5 stars
MusicHound	0/5 stars
Rolling Stone	2/5 stars

True Love received generally negative reviews. Alex Henderson of AllMusic awarded the album 2 out of 5 stars, calling it "an album Benatar was eager to make" but that "the results aren't breathtaking". Eric Deggans, writing as part of MusicHound Rock: The Essential Album Guide, awarded the album a "WOOF" rating, corresponding to 0 out of 5 stars, calling it "the biggest nail in her career coffin".

== Track listing ==
No.	Title	Writer(s)	Length
1.	"Bloodshot Eyes"	Hank Penny, Ruth Hall	2:49
2.	"Payin' the Cost to Be the Boss"	B.B. King	3:15
3.	"So Long"	Remus Harris, Russ Morgan, Irving Melsher	3:59
4.	"I've Got Papers on You"	King, Jules Taub	2:23
5.	"I Feel Lucky"	Neil Giraldo, Myron Grombacher	4:31
6.	"True Love"	Giraldo, Pat Benatar	4:42
7.	"The Good Life"	Giraldo, Grombacher	4:11
8.	"Evening"	Mitchell Parish, Harry White	3:43
9.	"I Get Evil"	Tampa Red	3:12
10.	"Don't Happen No More"	Obie Jessie	2:43
11.	"Please Come Home for Christmas" (CD edition bonus track)	Gene Redd, Charles Brown	3:09

== Personnel ==
=== Musicians ===
- Pat Benatar – vocals
- Neil Giraldo – guitars
- Charlie Giordano – piano, organ, accordion
- Chuck Domanico – bass
- Myron Grombacher – drums on tracks 1 and 10
- Lenny Castro – percussion

Roomful of Blues

- Greg Piccolo – tenor saxophone
- Doug James – baritone saxophone
- Rick Lataille – alto saxophone
- Carl Querfurth – trombone
- Bob Enos – trumpet
- John Rossi – drums

=== Production ===
- Neil Giraldo – producer
- Gordon Fordyce – engineer, mixing of tracks 4, 8, 11
- Frank Linx – assistant engineer. mixing of tracks 4, 8, 11
- Ed Thacker – mixing
- Stephen Marcussen – mastering at Precision Lacquer

== Charts ==
=== Weekly charts ===
Weekly chart performance for True Love
Chart (1991)	Peak position
Australian Albums (ARIA)	53
Canada Top Albums/CDs (RPM)	22
Dutch Albums (Album Top 100)	52
European Albums (Music & Media)	79
Finnish Albums (Suomen virallinen lista)	17
New Zealand Albums (RMNZ)	30
Swedish Albums (Sverigetopplistan)	30
Swiss Albums (Schweizer Hitparade)	39
UK Albums (Official Charts)	40
US Billboard 200	37

=== Year-end charts ===
Year-end chart performance for True Love
Chart (1991)	Position
Canada Top Albums/CDs (RPM)	100

== Certifications ==
Country	Organization	Year	Sales
Canada	CRIA	1991	Gold (+ 50,000)
