= Seven the Hard Way =

1985 studio album by Pat Benatar

Studio album by Pat Benatar
- Released: November 13, 1985
- Recorded: 1985
- Studios: Capitol (Hollywood); Cherokee (Hollywood); Conway (Hollywood); MCA Whitney (Glendale); Oasis (North Hollywood); Soundcastle (Hollywood)
- Genres: Rock; hard rock
- Length: 37:05
- Label: Chrysalis
- Producers: Neil Giraldo; Mike Chapman

Pat Benatar chronology
Tropico (1984)	Seven the Hard Way (1985)	Best Shots (1987)

Singles from Seven the Hard Way
- 1. "Invincible" Released: June 24, 1985; 2. "Sex as a Weapon" Released: November 4, 1985; 3. "Le Bel Age" Released: January 20, 1986

Professional ratings
Review scores
Source	Rating
AllMusic	3/5 stars
Rolling Stone	Positive

Seven the Hard Way is the sixth studio album by American singer Pat Benatar, released on November 13, 1985, by Chrysalis Records. It debuted on the US Billboard 200 for the week of December 14 and peaked at number 26, spawning the singles "Invincible", "Sex as a Weapon", and "Le Bel Age". The album has been certified Gold by the Recording Industry Association of America (RIAA).

The Grammy Award-nominated single "Invincible" was produced by Mike Chapman and recorded for the soundtrack of the Matthew Robbins film The Legend of Billie Jean, which, despite underperforming at the box office, became a cult classic to MTV fans in general. The song became commercially successful and was included on the album, despite its musical style differing from Benatar's at that time and more reminiscent of her earlier efforts. Benatar often commented at her concerts before performing the song that it "is from one of the worst movies ever made” to upset fans of the '80s film. Another track, "Run Between The Raindrops", was featured in The Stepfather.

Seven the Hard Way was Benatar's last album to feature bassist Donnie Nossov, who along with drummer Myron Grombacher went on to play with Lita Ford on her breakthrough album, Lita (1988), and on the supporting tour. Grombacher would return to Benatar's band for her follow-up album, Wide Awake in Dreamland, released after the three-year hiatus that followed Seven the Hard Way.

In 1998, BGO Records reissued Seven the Hard Way on CD with Tropico.

== Track listing ==
Side one
No.	Title	Writer(s)	Length
1.	"Sex as a Weapon"	Tom Kelly; Billy Steinberg	4:15
2.	"Le Bel Age"	Guy Marshall; Robert Tepper	5:11
3.	"Walking in the Underground"	Neil Giraldo; Myron Grombacher	4:39
4.	"Big Life"	Giraldo; Grombacher	2:40
5.	"Red Vision"	Giraldo; Grombacher	3:50

Side two
No.	Title	Writer(s)	Length
6.	"7 Rooms of Gloom" (Four Tops cover)	Brian Holland; Lamont Dozier; Eddie Holland	3:33
7.	"Run Between the Raindrops"	Giraldo; Grombacher	4:27
8.	"Invincible" (theme from The Legend of Billie Jean)	Simon Climie; Holly Knight	4:28
9.	"The Art of Letting Go"	Phil Brown; Richard Feldman; Grombacher	3:58

== Personnel ==
=== Band members ===
- Pat Benatar – vocals
- Neil Giraldo – guitars
- Charlie Giordano – keyboards
- Donnie Nossov – bass guitar
- Myron Grombacher – drums

=== Additional musicians ===
- Maxi Anderson, Rose Banks, Tuffy Cummings, Voncielle Faggett, Tommy Funderburk, Gean Johnson, Tom Kelly, Frank Linx, Phyllis St. James, Carmen Twillie, Táta Vega – background vocals
- Lenny Castro – percussion
- Uptown Horns – horns

=== Technical ===
- Neil Giraldo – production (tracks 1–7, 9)
- Joe Chiccarelli – associate production, engineering (tracks 1–7, 9); mixing (tracks 4, 5, 9)
- Mike Chapman – production (track 8)
- William Wittman – engineering, mixing (track 8)
- Dave Hernandez, Daren Klein, George Tutko – additional engineering
- Scott Church, Robert Corti, Marc DeSisto, Paul Ericksen, Steve Himelfarb, Gary Hollis, Richard McKernan, Charlie Paakkari, Brian Scheuble, Samii Taylor – engineering assistance
- Scotty Bem, Jeff Chonis – production coordination
- Michael Frondelli – mixing (tracks 1–3, 6, 7)
- George Marino – mastering at Sterling Sound (New York City)

=== Artwork ===
- Moshe Brakha – photography
- Larry Vigon – art direction, design

== Charts ==
=== Weekly charts ===
Weekly chart performance for Seven the Hard Way
Chart (1985–1986)	Peak position
Australian Albums (Kent Music Report)	19
Canada Top Albums/CDs (RPM)	35
European Albums (Eurotipsheet)	51
Finnish Albums (Suomen virallinen lista)	16
German Albums (Offizielle Top 100)	42
Japanese Albums (Oricon)	53
New Zealand Albums (RMNZ)	2
Swedish Albums (Sverigetopplistan)	32
UK Albums (Official Charts)	69
US Billboard 200	26

=== Year-end charts ===
Year-end chart performance for Seven the Hard Way
Chart (1986)	Position
Australian Albums (Kent Music Report)	84
New Zealand Albums (RMNZ)	35

== Certifications ==
Certifications for Seven the Hard Way
Region	Certification	Certified units/sales
Canada (Music Canada)	Platinum	100,000^{^}
New Zealand (RMNZ)	Gold	7,500^{^}
United States (RIAA)	Gold	500,000^{^}
^{^} Shipments figures based on certification alone.
