= Tropico (Pat Benatar album) =

- Cover photo by Rebecca Blake

Studio album by Pat Benatar
- Released: November 1, 1984
- Recorded: January–September 1984
- Studio: MCA Whitney Studios (Glendale, California)
- Genres: Pop rock; new wave; soft rock
- Length: 38:57
- Label: Chrysalis
- Producers: Neil Giraldo; Peter Coleman

Pat Benatar chronology
Live from Earth (1983)	Tropico (1984)	Seven the Hard Way (1985)

Singles from Tropico
- 1. "We Belong" Released: October 16, 1984; 2. "Painted Desert" Released: 1984 (Europe and Oceania only); 3. "Ooh Ooh Song" Released: January 7, 1985; 4. "Temporary Heroes" Released: March 18, 1985 (promo)

Tropico is the fifth studio album by American rock singer Pat Benatar, released on November 1, 1984, by Chrysalis Records. It is the first album to feature bassist Donnie Nossov, who replaced Roger Capps in Benatar's band. It marks Benatar and Giraldo's first attempt to move away from Benatar's famed "hard rock" sound and start experimenting with new "gentler" styles and new wave sounds.

The album peaked at No. 14 on the U.S. Billboard 200 album chart and produced the Grammy-nominated Top Five Pop hit "We Belong". Other well-known songs from the album include "Painted Desert", "Outlaw Blues" and "Ooh Ooh Song" (also a Top 40 hit). A Spanish version of "Ooh Ooh Song" was on the B-side of the US single and appeared also on her 1999 compilation, Synchronistic Wanderings. Tropico was Benatar's sixth consecutive Platinum-certified album in the United States.

BGO Records reissued Tropico on CD with Seven the Hard Way.

== Critical reception ==
Professional ratings
Review scores
Source	Rating
AllMusic	3/5 stars
Rolling Stone	3/5 stars

The European magazine Music & Media praised Tropico's "excellent production" and noted the "softer and sophisticated direction" compared to earlier works, and recommended the tracks "Painted Desert" and "Love in the Ice Age".

== Track listing ==
Side one
No.	Title	Writer(s)	Length
1.	"Diamond Field"	Neil Giraldo, Myron Grombacher, Pat Benatar	3:20
2.	"We Belong"	Eric Lowen, Dan Navarro	3:40
3.	"Painted Desert"	Giraldo, Grombacher	5:24
4.	"Temporary Heroes"	Nick Trevesick, Ginny Clee	4:30
5.	"Love in the Ice Age"	Giraldo, Charles Giordano, Grombacher, Benatar	4:05

Side two
No.	Title	Writer(s)	Length
6.	"Ooh Ooh Song"	Giraldo, Benatar	4:28
7.	"The Outlaw Blues"	Giraldo, Grombacher	3:47
8.	"Suburban King"	Giraldo, Billy Steinberg	1:48
9.	"A Crazy World Like This"	Giraldo, Tom Kelly, Steinberg	4:02
10.	"Takin' It Back"	Giraldo, Benatar	4:07

UK Edition
No.	Title	Writer(s)	Length
1.	"Diamond Field"	Giraldo, Grombacher, Benatar	3:20
2.	"We Belong"	Lowen, Navarro	3:40
3.	"Painted Desert"	Giraldo, Grombacher	5:24
4.	"Temporary Heroes"	Trevesick, Clee	4:30
5.	"Love Is a Battlefield"	Holly Knight, Mike Chapman	5:24
6.	"Ooh Ooh Song"	Giraldo, Benatar	4:28
7.	"The Outlaw Blues"	Giraldo, Grombacher	3:47
8.	"Suburban King"	Giraldo, Steinberg	1:48
9.	"A Crazy World Like This"	Giraldo, Kelly, Steinberg	4:02
10.	"Takin' It Back"	Giraldo, Benatar	4:07
11.	"Love in the Ice Age"	Giraldo, Giordano, Grombacher, Benatar	4:05

== Personnel ==
=== Band members ===
- Pat Benatar – vocals
- Neil Giraldo – guitars, harmonica, percussion
- Charlie Giordano – keyboards, percussion
- Donnie Nossov – bass, backing vocals on track 6
- Myron Grombacher – drums, percussion

=== Additional musicians ===
- Roger Capps – bass on tracks 2 and 3
- Lenny Castro – percussion on tracks 3 and 9
- Unknown (Note: The record sleeve says "Thanks […] The Kids on «We Belong» […]".) – backing vocals on track 2

=== Production ===
- Neil Giraldo, Peter Coleman – producers, mixing at The Complex Studios and Sound Castle Studios, Los Angeles
- Dave Hernandez – assistant engineer, Spanish translation of track 6
- Murray Dvorkin, Bino Espinoza – mixing assistants
- George Marino – mastering at Sterling Sound, New York

== Charts ==
=== Weekly charts ===
Weekly chart performance for Tropico
Chart (1984–1985)	Peak position
Australian Albums (Kent Music Report)	9
Canada Top Albums/CDs (RPM)	21
Dutch Albums (Album Top 100)	23
European Albums (Music & Media)	30
German Albums (Offizielle Top 100)	26
Japanese Albums (Oricon)	39
New Zealand Albums (RMNZ)	7
Swedish Albums (Sverigetopplistan)	19
Swiss Albums (Schweizer Hitparade)	21
UK Albums (Official Charts)	31
US Billboard 200	14

=== Year-end charts ===
Year-end chart performance for Tropico
Chart (1985)	Position
Australian Albums (Kent Music Report)	64
Canada Top Albums/CDs (RPM)	71

== Certifications ==
Certifications for Tropico
Region	Certification	Certified units/sales
Australia (ARIA)	Gold	35,000^{^}
Canada (Music Canada)	Platinum	100,000^{^}
New Zealand (RMNZ)	Platinum	15,000^{^}
United Kingdom (BPI)	Silver	60,000^{^}
United States (RIAA)	Platinum	1,000,000^{^}
^{^} Shipments figures based on certification alone.
