= Live from Earth =

1983 live album by Pat Benatar

Live album by Pat Benatar
- Released: October 1983
- Recorded: France and California during the 'Get Nervous' tour of 1982–1983, with Le Mobile and Artisan Recorders Mobile One
- Studios: MCA Whitney Studios, Glendale, California, 1983 (studio tracks)
- Genres: Rock, hard rock
- Length: 43:02
- Label: Chrysalis
- Producers: Neil Giraldo; Neil Giraldo and Peter Coleman (studio tracks)

Pat Benatar chronology
Get Nervous (1982)	Live from Earth (1983)	Tropico (1984)

Singles from Live from Earth
- 1. "Love Is a Battlefield" Released: September 12, 1983; 2. "Lipstick Lies" Released: 1983 (New Zealand Only)

Professional ratings
Review scores
Source	Rating
AllMusic	3/5 stars
Rolling Stone	2/5 stars
Kerrang!	(mixed)

In Concert

Video by Pat Benatar
- Released: 1985
- Recorded: December 19, 1982
- Venues: New Haven Veteran's Memorial Coliseum, New Haven, Connecticut
- Genres: Rock, hard rock
- Length: 73 minutes
- Label: RCA/Columbia Pictures
- Directors: Marty Callner, Molly Miles
- Producers: Rick Newman, Richard Fields, Karen Glass, Neil Giraldo

Pat Benatar video chronology
Hit Videos (1984)	In Concert (1985)	Pat Benatar The Visual Music Collection (1987)

Professional ratings
Review scores
Source	Rating
AllMusic	2.5/5 stars

Live from Earth is the first live album by American rock singer Pat Benatar, and was released in October 1983. The album was recorded during Benatar's sold out Get Nervous world tour in late 1982 and early 1983. It also contains two studio tracks, "Love Is a Battlefield" and "Lipstick Lies", which were produced by Neil Giraldo and Peter Coleman. The album peaked at No. 13 on the Billboard 200 albums chart and shipped more than a million copies. "Love Is a Battlefield" was an international hit single and garnered Benatar her fourth consecutive Grammy Award for Best Female Rock Vocal Performance in 1984.

A concert from the same tour was filmed for a HBO special and released on VHS in 1985 with the title In Concert, but with a different and expanded track listing. The footage was re-released on VHS with the title Benatar the same year and in 1998 on DVD as Live in New Haven, without the last two tracks.

== Track listing ==
Side one

1. "Fire and Ice" (Tom Kelly, Scott St. Clair Sheets, Pat Benatar) – 3:46
2. "Lookin' for a Stranger" (Franne Golde, Peter McIan) – 3:28
3. "I Want Out" (Neil Giraldo, Billy Steinberg) – 4:05
4. "We Live for Love" (Giraldo) – 3:39
5. "Hell Is for Children" (Giraldo, Benatar, Roger Capps) – 6:06

Side two

1. "Hit Me with Your Best Shot" (Eddie Schwartz) – 3:07
2. "Promises in the Dark" (Giraldo, Benatar) – 5:14
3. "Heartbreaker" (Geoff Gill, Cliff Wade) – 4:21
4. "Love Is a Battlefield" (Mike Chapman, Holly Knight) – 5:23 (studio recording)
5. "Lipstick Lies" (Giraldo, Myron Grombacher) – 3:51 (studio recording)

== VHS track listing ==
- "Anxiety (Get Nervous)”
- "Fire and Ice"
- "You Better Run"
- "Little Too Late"
- "Fight It Out"
- "Looking for a Stranger"
- "I Want Out"
- "We Live for Love"
- "In the Heat of the Night"
- "Shadows of the Night"
- "Heartbreaker"
- "Hit Me with Your Best Shot"
- "Hell Is for Children"
- "Little Paradise"
- "Love Is a Battlefield" (video)

== Personnel ==
- Pat Benatar – vocals
- Neil Giraldo – guitar, backing vocals
- Charlie Giordano – keyboards
- Roger Capps – bass guitar, backing vocals
- Myron Grombacher – drums

== Production ==
=== Live recordings ===
- Neil Giraldo – producer, mixing
- Guy Charbonneau – engineer, mixing
- Cliff Bonnell, Andy Rose, Tim Wybrow, Bobby Ainsworth – assistant engineers

=== Studio recordings ===
- Neil Geraldo, Peter Coleman – producers, mixing
- Dave Hernandez – assistant engineer
- Steve Hall – mastering

=== Video recordings ===
- Marty Callner – director
- Molly Miles – additional directing
- Rick Newman, Richard Fields – producers
- Neil Giraldo – audio producer
- Karen Glass – associate producer
- Bob Giraldi – "Love Is a Battlefield" video director

== Charts ==
=== Weekly charts ===
Weekly chart performance for Live from Earth
Chart (1983–1984)	Peak position
Australian Albums (Kent Music Report)	2
Canada Top Albums/CDs (RPM)	25
Dutch Albums (Album Top 100)	4
European Albums (Music & Media)	21
German Albums (Offizielle Top 100)	7
Japanese Albums (Oricon)	58
New Zealand Albums (RMNZ)	12
Swedish Albums (Sverigetopplistan)	45
UK Albums (Official Charts)	60
US Billboard 200	13
US Rock Albums (Billboard)	1

=== Year-end charts ===
Year-end chart performance for Live from Earth
Chart (1984)	Position
Australian Albums (Kent Music Report)	18
Dutch Albums (Album Top 100)	32
German Albums (Offizielle Top 100)	64
US Billboard 200	84

== Certifications ==
Region	Certification	Certified units/sales
Canada (Music Canada)	Platinum	100,000^{^}
New Zealand (RMNZ)	Platinum	15,000^{^}
United States (RIAA)	Platinum	1,000,000^{^}
^{^} Shipments figures based on certification alone.
