= Innamorata (album) =

Studio album by Pat Benatar
- Released: June 3, 1997
- Recorded: 1996–1997
- Studio: Spyder's Soul Kitchen, Los Angeles, Royaltone Studios, North Hollywood, Can-Am, Tarzana, California; Triclops, Atlanta, Georgia
- Genre: Rock, acoustic
- Length: 56:13
- Label: CMC International
- Producer: Neil Giraldo

Pat Benatar chronology
Gravity's Rainbow (1993)	Innamorata (1997)	Synchronistic Wanderings (1999)

Singles from Innamorata
- 1. "Strawberry Wine (Life Is Sweet)" Released: 1997

Professional ratings
Review scores
Source	Rating
AllMusic	3/5 stars

Innamorata is American rock singer Pat Benatar's tenth studio album, and her eleventh album overall, released in 1997. It charted a single week on the US Billboard album chart, at No. 171.

== Track listing ==
All songs by Pat Benatar and Neil Giraldo, except as noted

1. "Guitar Intro" – 0:23
2. "Only You" – 6:05
3. "River of Love" – 5:17
4. "I Don't Want to Be Your Friend" – 5:09
5. "Strawberry Wine" – 5:53
6. "Purgatory" – 4:54
7. "Papa's Roses" – 4:20
8. "At This Time" – 4:37
9. "Dirty Little Secrets" (Benatar, Giraldo, Bob Thiele Jr.) – 5:18
10. "Angry" – 4:09
11. "In These Times" – 6:49
12. "Innamorata" – 3:23
13. "Gina's Song" (Haley Giraldo) – 0:22

== Personnel ==
=== Band members ===
- Pat Benatar – vocals, percussion, mixing
- Neil Giraldo – guitar, keyboards, percussion, producer, mixing
- Mick Mahan – bass
- Allison Cornell – violin, keyboards
- Ray Brinker – drums, percussion

=== Additional musicians ===
- Doug Norwine – saxophone
- Susie Katayama – cello
- Scott Breadman – percussion
- T Lavitz – Hammond B3

=== Production ===
- Russ Fowler – engineer, mixing
- Charles Boulis, Steve MacMillan, Pat Thrasher, John Aguto, Jeff Thomas – engineers
- Joe Gastwirt – mastering

== Charts ==
Chart (1997)	Peak position
US Billboard 200	171
