= Lowen & Navarro =

American musical duo, songwriting team

- Origin: Los Angeles, California, United States
- Genres: Folk rock, Adult album alternative
- Years active: 1987–2009
- Labels: Chameleon Records, Parachute Records, Intersound, Red Hen Records
- Members: Eric Lowen; Dan Navarro
- Website: http://www.lownav.com

Lowen & Navarro were a songwriting team composed of David Eric Lowen and Dan Navarro, who met in Los Angeles, California, in the 1980s. They wrote the song "We Belong", which became a major hit for Pat Benatar in 1984, and the song "Hammerhead Shark" which was re-written and included on David Lee Roth's gold certified 1991 album A Little Ain't Enough. They became active as a performing group in 1987. In 1990, they began to release a number of records of their own, including "Learning To Fall" and "Purpose".

In 1991, the single "Walking on a Wire" peaked at number 131 on the Australian singles, and the album of the same name, peaked at number 130 on the Australian albums (ARIA Charts).

On March 17, 2004, Lowen was diagnosed with amyotrophic lateral sclerosis (ALS), also known as Lou Gehrig's disease. Because of compromises to his playing and singing, Lowen & Navarro ceased touring. They played their last shows on June 5, 2009, at the Rams Head Tavern in Annapolis, Maryland, and on June 6, 2009, at the Birchmere in Alexandria, Virginia.

Lowen died of complications of ALS on March 23, 2012, aged 60.

Navarro continues to tour as a solo performer. He is the cousin of guitarist Dave Navarro.

Keep The Light Alive: Celebrating The Music of Lowen & Navarro was released November 2009 with Lowen & Navarro songs performed by Jackson Browne, John Ondrasik of Five For Fighting, Keb' Mo', the Bangles, Severin Browne, Joel Rafael, Andy Chase, the Refugees, Freebo, Eddie From Ohio, Phil Parlapiano, Charlie Wadhams, and Stonehoney. The proceeds of the album benefit the Eric Lowen Trust, ALS Association Greater Los Angeles, and Augie's Quest.

== Discography ==
- Walking on a Wire (Chameleon Records, 1990)
- Broken Moon (Parachute Records, 1993)
- Walking on a Wire re-release with bonus tracks (Parachute Records, 1994)
- Pendulum (Parachute Records, 1995)
- Live Wire (Intersound, 1997)
- Scratch at the Door (Intersound, 1998)
- Live Radio (Red Hen Records, 2002)
- 3 For The Road (Mad Raine Music, 2003)
- At Long Last...Christmas (Red Hen Records, 2004)
- All the Time in the World (Red Hen Records, 2004)
- Carry On Together (AIX Records, 2005)
- Hogging the Covers (Red Hen Records, 2006)
- Learning To Fall (Red Hen Records, 2008)

== Video ==
- Lowen & Navarro TFV, 1999, VHS
- Live at Kulak's Woodshed: A concert to benefit the ALS Association Greater Los Angeles, DVD (Red Hen, 2005) (ALSALA)
- Carry On Together, DVD & CD, (AIX Records, 2005)
- Pieces of Time Spent, DVD, (AIX Records, 2007)
