= Heartbreaker (Pat Benatar song) =

1979 single by Pat Benatar

- U.S. vinyl single picture sleeve

Single by Pat Benatar

from the album In the Heat of the Night
- B-side: "My Clone Sleeps Alone"
- Released: October 26, 1979
- Recorded: 1979
- Studio: MCA Whitney Studios (Glendale, California)
- Genre: Hard rock; arena rock
- Length: 3:29
- Label: Chrysalis
- Songwriters: Geoff Gill; Cliff Wade
- Producers: Mike Chapman; Peter Coleman

Pat Benatar singles chronology
"If You Think You Know How to Love Me" (1979)	"Heartbreaker" (1979)	"We Live for Love" (1980)

"Heartbreaker" is a rock and roll song written by Geoff Gill and Cliff Wade, and first recorded by English singer Jenny Darren on her 1978 album Queen of Fools. American vocalist Pat Benatar recorded the song in 1979 for her her debut studio album In the Heat of the Night, with a few minor changes to the lyrics aiming for American rather than UK listeners.

"Heartbreaker" was the second single from Benatar's album after the first, "If You Think You Know How to Love Me", was a commercial disappointment. "Heartbreaker" proved to be Benatar's breakthrough single, reaching number 23 on the Billboard Hot 100 while spending four and a half months on the chart, the fourth longest of all of her singles. It was more popular on album-oriented rock stations as it peaked at number 13 on Tunecasters Rock Tracks chart in March 1980. The song reached number 16 in Canada, number 14 in New Zealand, and number 95 in Australia.

VH1 ranked the song the 72nd best hard rock song of all time.

== Use in other media ==
The song is featured as downloadable content for the music video game series Rock Band, and is a playable song in the game Guitar Hero World Tour. The song is also a playable song in the game Karaoke Revolution: Presents American Idol as well as downloadable content for its sequel, American Idol Encore. It is featured as a Jam Track in Fortnite Festival, a rhythm game spin-off of Fortnite Battle Royale.

The tenth season premiere of Supernatural featured "Heartbreaker" in the recap montage of the previous season. It was also featured during a chase/shootout scene in the 2021 film Nobody. The song was performed by Benatar and her band in the Charmed episode "Lucky Charmed."

Former American Idol finalist Allison Iraheta regularly covered the song as part of her set on the Glam Nation Tour.

A cover of the song by American singer-songwriter Dolly Parton featuring Benatar and American musician Neil Giraldo was released with Parton's album Rockstar.

== Track listing ==
7"
- A. "Heartbreaker" – 3:26
- B. "My Clone Sleeps Alone" – 3:27

7" (Netherlands and Germany)
- A. "Heartbreaker" – 3:26
- B. "So Sincere" – 3:28

12" Promo (Japan)
- A. "Heartbreaker" – 3:26
- B. "We Live for Love" – 3:53

2009 Digital single
1. "Heartbreaker" – 3:28
2. "Hit Me With Your Best Shot" – 2:52

== Charts ==
=== Weekly charts ===
Chart (1979–1980)	Peak position
Australia Kent Music Report	95
Canada Top Singles (RPM)	18
New Zealand (RIANZ)	14
US Billboard Hot 100	23
U.S. Cash Box Top 100	19

=== Year-end charts ===
Chart (1980)	Rank
U.S. Billboard Hot 100	83
