= We Belong =

Single by Pat Benatar

from the album Tropico
- B-side: "Suburban King"
- Released: October 16, 1984
- Recorded: January 24, 1984
- Studio: Legacy Music Group
- Genre: New wave; arena rock
- Length: 3:40
- Label: Chrysalis
- Songwriters: David Eric Lowen; Dan Navarro
- Producers: Neil Giraldo; Peter Coleman

Pat Benatar singles chronology
"Love Is a Battlefield" (1983)	"We Belong" (1984)	"Painted Desert" (1984)

"We Belong" is a song recorded by American rock singer Pat Benatar, released through Legacy Music Group on October 16, 1984, as the lead single from her fifth studio album, Tropico (1984). The song was written by the songwriting duo of Eric Lowen and Dan Navarro. It matched the success of "Love Is a Battlefield" on the Billboard Hot 100 singles chart in the United States, peaking at #5. It reached #3 on Billboard's Top Rock Tracks chart and #34 on the Adult Contemporary chart.

The single was also popular in the United Kingdom, where it peaked at #22 and became Benatar's first top 40 hit. The song earned Benatar a Grammy nomination for Best Female Pop Vocal Performance alongside Linda Ronstadt, Tina Turner, Madonna, and Whitney Houston. It was awarded a gold certification in Canada for sales in excess of 50,000 units.

The music video uses the 7-inch version of the song, which contains some additional vocals in the 4 bar introduction that are not present in the album version.

The song was featured on the score to Talladega Nights: The Ballad of Ricky Bobby, soundtrack of Deadpool 2 (2018) and the video game Grand Theft Auto: Vice City Stories (2006), on the fictional radio station Emotion 98.3.

== Reception ==
Cash Box magazine said "This first single taken from the Tropico album is a collage of eclectic-electric effects and a sensitive and mature vocal offering from Benatar. Definitely not the standard Benatar/Geraldo [sic] hard rock jam, 'We Belong' is an ode to love which shows a whole world of vocal and instrumental nuances that have not been explored before by the powerful vocalist and her husband-producer-guitarist Neil Geraldo [sic]. An excellent move forward which should open up new commercial doors for this already well-established team."

== Track listings ==
7" single

- A. "We Belong" - 3:40
- B. "Suburban King" - 1:57

12" single (Europe)

- A. "We Belong" - 3:40
- B1. "We Live for Love" ('84 Re-Mix) - 3:55
- B2. "Suburban King" - 1:57

== Charts ==
=== Weekly charts ===
Weekly chart performance for "We Belong"
Chart (1984–1985)	Peak position
Australia (Kent Music Report)	7
Austria (Ö3 Austria Top 40)	12
Belgium (Ultratop 50 Flanders)	16
Canada Top Singles (RPM)	8
Europe (European Top 100 Singles)	25
Ireland (IRMA)	8
Luxembourg (Radio Luxembourg)	20
Netherlands (Single Top 100)	13
Netherlands (Dutch Top 40)	10
New Zealand (Recorded Music NZ)	7
Switzerland (Schweizer Hitparade)	5
UK Singles (Official Charts)	22
US Billboard Hot 100	5
US Adult Contemporary (Billboard)	34
US Mainstream Rock (Billboard)	3
US Cash Box Top 100 Singles	6
West Germany (GfK)	9

=== Year-end charts ===
Year-end chart performance for "We Belong"
Chart (1985)	Position
Australia (Kent Music Report)	68
US Billboard Hot 100	39
US Cash Box Top 100 Singles	87

== Certifications ==
Certifications for "We Belong"
Region	Certification	Certified units/sales
Canada (Music Canada)	Gold	50,000^{^}
New Zealand (RMNZ)	Platinum	30,000^{‡}
United Kingdom (BPI)	Silver	200,000^{‡}
^{^} Shipments figures based on certification alone.^{‡} Sales+streaming figures based on certification alone.
