= The Legend of Billie Jean =

1985 American drama film by Matthew Robbins

- Theatrical release poster
- Directed by: Matthew Robbins
- Written by: Lawrence Konner; Mark Rosenthal
- Produced by: Rob Cohen
- Starring: Helen Slater; Keith Gordon; Christian Slater; Peter Coyote
- Cinematography: Jeffrey L. Kimball
- Edited by: Cynthia Scheider
- Music by: Craig Safan
- Production companies: Delphi III Productions; The Guber-Peters Company
- Distributed by: Tri-Star Pictures
- Release date: July 19, 1985
- Running time: 96 minutes
- Country: United States
- Language: English
- Box office: $3.1 million (US)

The Legend of Billie Jean is a 1985 American action drama film directed by Matthew Robbins. It stars Helen Slater, Keith Gordon, Christian Slater (in his film debut), and Peter Coyote.

The plot follows Billie Jean Davy, a young woman from Texas, and her brother Binx, who become fugitives after a confrontation with a local bully turns violent. Billie Jean demands justice and becomes an icon, leading to a standoff with the authorities.

== Plot ==
Billie Jean Davy, a young woman from Corpus Christi, Texas, rides with her younger brother, Binx, on his Honda Elite scooter to a lake to go swimming. Stopping for a milkshake at a Sonic fast food joint, they have to deal with Hubie Pyatt, a rowdy teen, and his friends hitting on Billie Jean. However, Binx humiliates Hubie by throwing a milkshake in his face. Later at the lake, as Billie Jean tells Binx about the weather in Vermont (a place he wants to visit), Hubie steals Binx's scooter.

As Binx looks for his scooter later that night, Billie Jean goes to the authorities with her friends Putter and Ophelia. They report the theft to Detective Larry Ringwald, who urges them to wait and see if matters resolve. At home, Billie Jean finds Binx beaten and his scooter severely damaged. The next day, Billie Jean, Binx, and Ophelia go to Mr. Pyatt's shop and learn that repairing the scooter will cost $608 (equivalent to $1,820 in 2025). While initially appearing helpful and understanding, Pyatt propositions Billie Jean and then attempts to rape her. Meanwhile, Binx and Ophelia enter the store to check on Billie Jean when Binx finds a gun in the cash register while looking for the money to fix his scooter. A distressed Billie Jean flees from the back of the store. Binx aims the weapon at Pyatt, who says that the gun is unloaded. Binx then fires it, wounding Pyatt in the shoulder. The siblings and Ophelia flee and become fugitives, along with Putter, who comes with them.

Meanwhile, Ringwald realizes that he made a mistake not listening to Billie Jean, who wants only the cash to fix the scooter and an apology from Pyatt. With help from Lloyd Muldaur, the son of the district attorney, who voluntarily becomes her "hostage", Billie Jean makes a video of her demands, featuring herself with her long blonde hair chopped into a pixie cut, inspired after watching a movie about Joan of Arc on TV. (Note: The 1957 film Saint Joan.) She dons a revolutionary-style wardrobe including combat boots, fatigues, and a wetsuit top with the sleeves torn off. As media coverage increases, Billie Jean becomes a teen icon, and young fans follow her every movement. Facing uncertain dangers, both physical and legal, Billie Jean is forced to turn in Putter and Ophelia to the cops for their safety. Ringwald arrives at the abandoned miniature golf course where the group has taken refuge. He demands to know where Billie Jean is, and Ophelia replies, "Everywhere!"

Pyatt issues a bounty for her apprehension, but Ringwald counters with a more peaceful offer and a promise to repair Binx's scooter. Billie Jean realizes that the best plan is to turn herself in. During a rally being held, where a brand new scooter is offered for Billie Jean to turn in herself and Lloyd, Binx puts on a dress and pretends to be her, walking behind Lloyd. However, Hubie proclaims the masquerade, and the police shoot Binx.

Billie Jean runs to catch the ambulance taking Binx away, to no avail. She sees a booth with Billie Jean merchandise, run by Pyatt. She confronts Pyatt and gets him to admit the actions that led to him being shot. He gives Billie Jean the money, but she refuses to take it all and rams her knee into his crotch, sending him sprawling to the ground and knocking over a nearby torch. She tells him to keep his money and to go buy somebody else, throwing the money back in his face. Pyatt gets to his feet as the overturned torch begins to set his merchandise stands on fire. The onlookers (including Hubie), seeing how Billie Jean was exploited and their indirect involvement in it, throw all the merchandise into the rapidly growing fire and leave in disgust. As the merchandise burns, Billie Jean departs as well, but not before thanking Ringwald and giving Lloyd a kiss. Later, Billie Jean and Binx (in an arm sling) are hitchhiking in Vermont. Binx, after complaining about the cold, admires a snowmobile.

== Cast ==
- Helen Slater as Billie Jean Davy
- Keith Gordon as Lloyd Muldaur
- Christian Slater as Binx Davy
- Richard Bradford as Mr. Pyatt
- Peter Coyote as Lieutenant Larry Ringwald
- Martha Gehman as Ophelia Jacks
- Yeardley Smith as Putter Jacks
- Barry Tubb as Hubie Pyatt
- Dean Stockwell as Mr. Muldaur

== Production ==
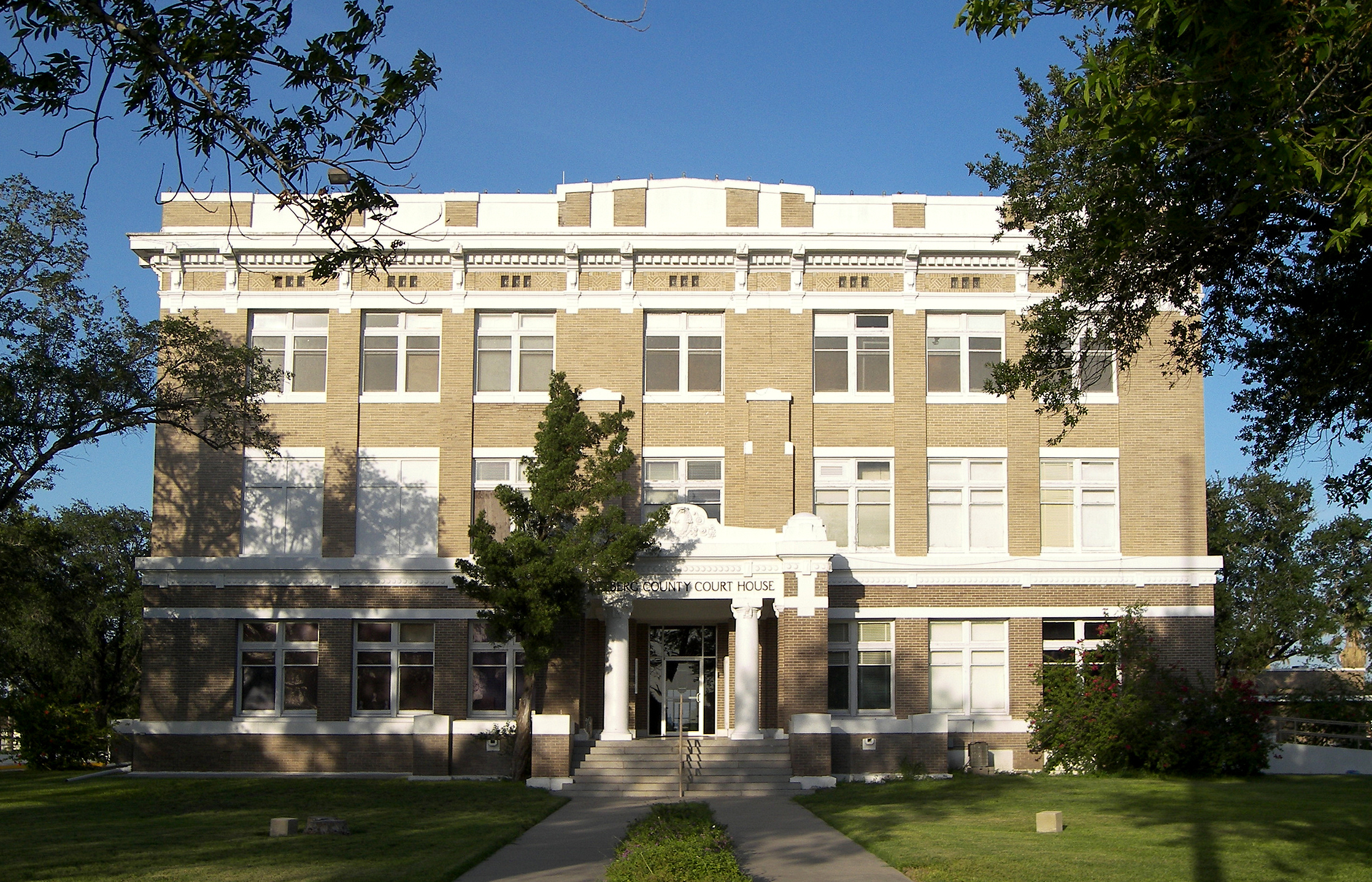
Kleberg County Courthouse in Kingsville, Texas (2008). Exterior of the police headquarters.

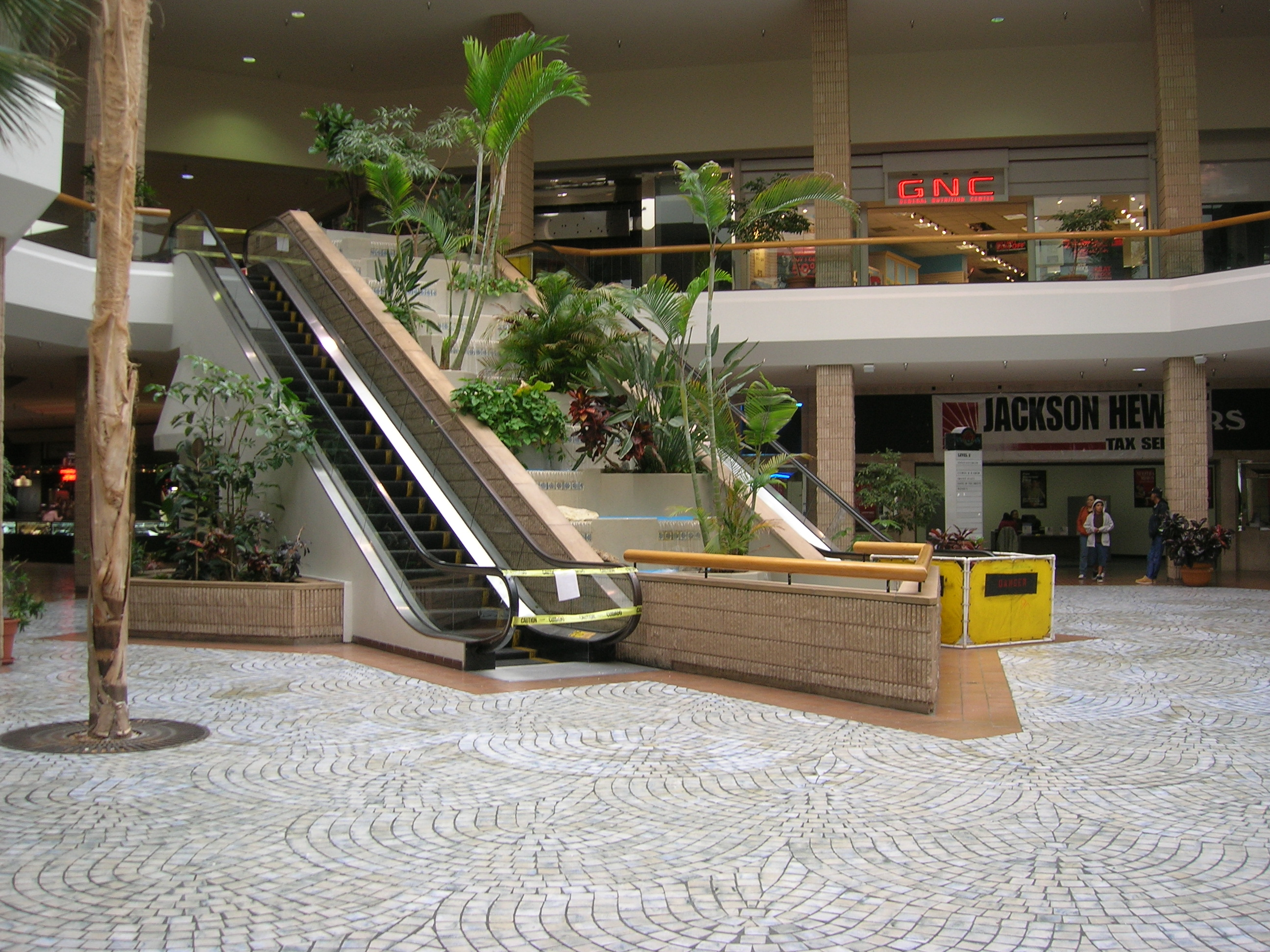
Sunrise Mall in Corpus Christi, Texas (2009). Location of the money handover cheat and subsequent chase.

Filming locations included the Sunrise Mall, several locations along South Padre Island Drive in Corpus Christi, Texas, and Copper Mountain in Summit County, Colorado for Vermont.

The original title of the film was Fair Is Fair.

== Soundtrack ==
Craig Safan – "Mall Scam"
Used at the beginning of the Sunrise Mall scene where the teenagers left IOUs for the items they "borrowed" from a toy shop.

Craig Safan – "Binx Shot"
Underlying track when Binx is erroneously hit by a sharpshooter while trying to exchange his "hostage" Lloyd for the repaired scooter at the beach.

Craig Safan produced the original score for the film writing a couple of synthpop-styled instrumental tracks. Furthermore, some rock songs were added to the soundtrack which had never been officially released. The movie's theme song "Invincible" by Pat Benatar peaked at number 10 on the Billboard Hot 100 in September 1985, while the reissue of Billy Idol's single "Rebel Yell" climbed up to number six on the UK Singles Chart in October 1985.

- "Invincible" (Theme from "The Legend of Billie Jean") – Pat Benatar
- "Closing In" – Mark Safan
- "Boys in Town" – Divinyls
- "Heart Telegraph" – Divinyls
- "Rebel Yell" – Billy Idol
- "It’s My Life" – Wendy O. Williams
- "Time to Explain" – Bruce Witkin & The Kids
- "Self Defense" – Chas Sanford

== Reception ==
Jay Boyar of the Orlando Sentinel stated that the film "has quite a lot going for it" and "doesn't get many points for finesse, but it has energy, good performances and more wit than you'd expect." He added, "One reason that sections of the movie are effective is that Helen Slater has enough style and presence to be believable as a young woman who is taken for a modern Joan of Arc. As Billie Jean, she's got the clear eyes of a dreamer and the toughness of a winner." Janet Maslin of The New York Times said that the film is "competently made, sometimes attractively acted (particularly by Peter Coyote)... and bankrupt beyond belief. It's hard to imagine that even the film makers, let alone audiences, can believe in a sweet, selfless heroine who just can't help becoming a superstar."

The film holds a 39% approval rating on Rotten Tomatoes, based on 38 reviews with the following consensus: "Rebellious in spirit and anarchic in style, this Helen Slater–starring vehicle holds a certain youthful cool but is otherwise a disjointed retelling of an oft-repeated legend."

== Home media ==
The film was released on Betamax and VHS home video in 1985.

In 2009, Sony Pictures Home Entertainment released in Europe a Spanish-titled DVD La Leyenda de Billie Jean, with 4:3 open matte image, but without any bonus material. A remastered NTSC DVD including commentary by Helen Slater and Yeardley Smith was released on November 1, 2011, via their manufactured on demand service.

Mill Creek Entertainment released a retail version of the DVD, along with a Blu-ray edition on July 22, 2014.

== See also ==
- Billy Jack
- List of American films of 1985
- Social bandit
