= List of number-one singles of 1978 (Canada) =

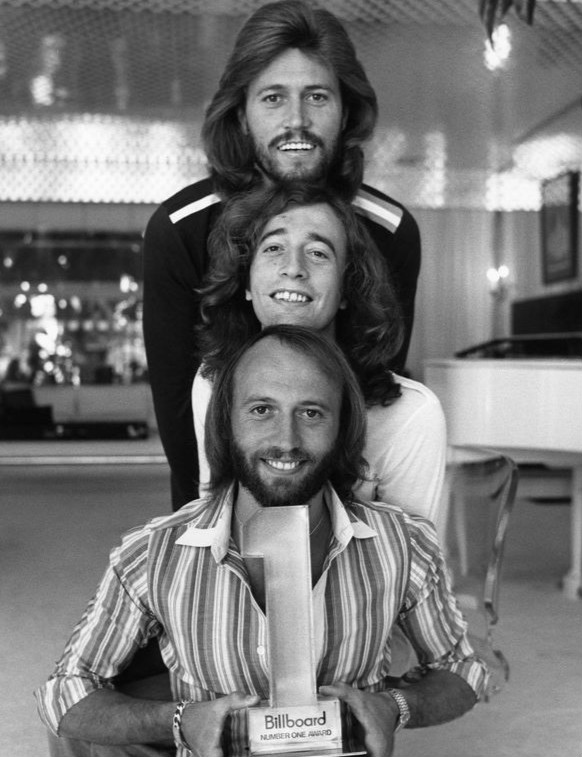
The Bee Gees holds the number-one year-end hit in Canada in 1978, with "Night Fever" from the Saturday Night Fever soundtrack.

RPM was a Canadian music magazine that published the best-performing singles chart in Canada from 1964 to 2000. In 1978, twenty-eight singles reached number one in the RPM chart. "How Deep Is Your Love" by the Bee Gees held the top position from 1977 into 1978, and Gino Vannelli achieved the final number-one hit of the year with "I Just Wanna Stop". Nine acts had their first number-one hit, such as Player, Dan Hill, Samantha Sang, Donny Hathaway, Bonnie Tyler, Gerry Rafferty, the Commodores, Nick Gilder and Gino Vannelli. Barry Gibb wrote or co-wrote seven of the chart's number-one songs. Four Canadian acts, Dan Hill, Anne Murray, Nick Gilder and Gino Vannelli, had one number-one song each in the chart that year.

The longest-running number-one single of the year, and also the best-performing single of the year, was the Bee Gees' "Night Fever", from the Saturday Night Fever soundtrack, which spent five weeks at number one. The Bee Gees also had the most weeks at number one, totalling thirteen weeks, and also had two further number-one singles earlier in the year with "How Deep Is Your Love" and "Stayin' Alive", both also from the Saturday Night Fever soundtrack and having spent four weeks each at number one in 1978. Three singles, Gerry Rafferty's "Baker Street", the Commodores' "Three Times a Lady" and Anne Murray's "You Needed Me", stayed at number one for four weeks each that year.

== Chart history ==
Key
The yellow background indicates the #1 song on RPM's Year-End Top 200 Singles of 1978.

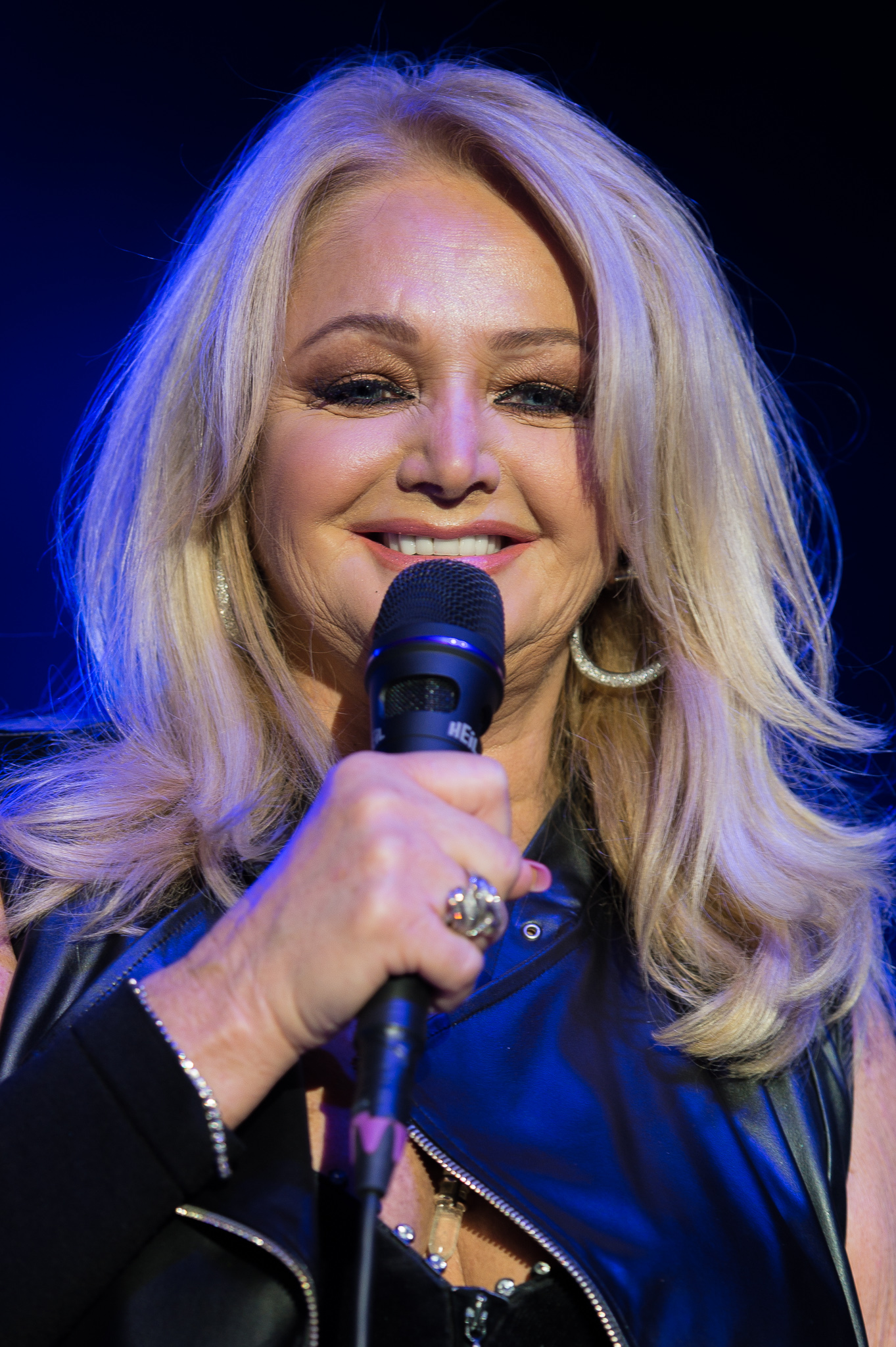
Welsh singer Bonnie Tyler (pictured in 2016) charted her first number-one in Canada in 1978 with "It's a Heartache".

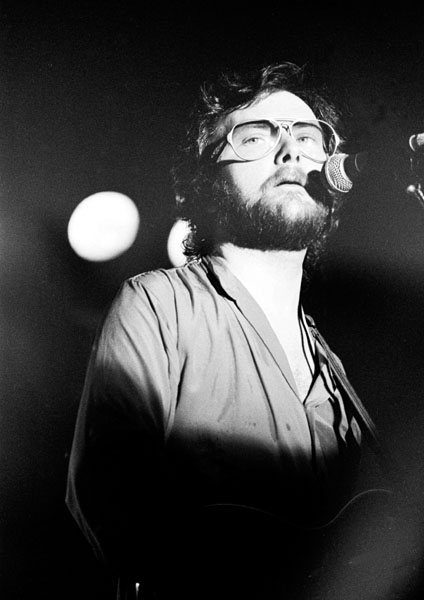
British singer-songwriter Gerry Rafferty charted his only number-one hit in Canada in 1978 for four weeks with "Baker Street".

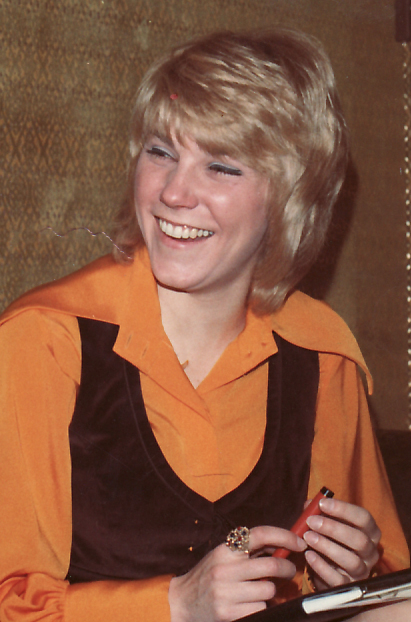
Anne Murray spent four weeks at number one with "You Needed Me" to become the third Canadian act to reach number one in 1978.

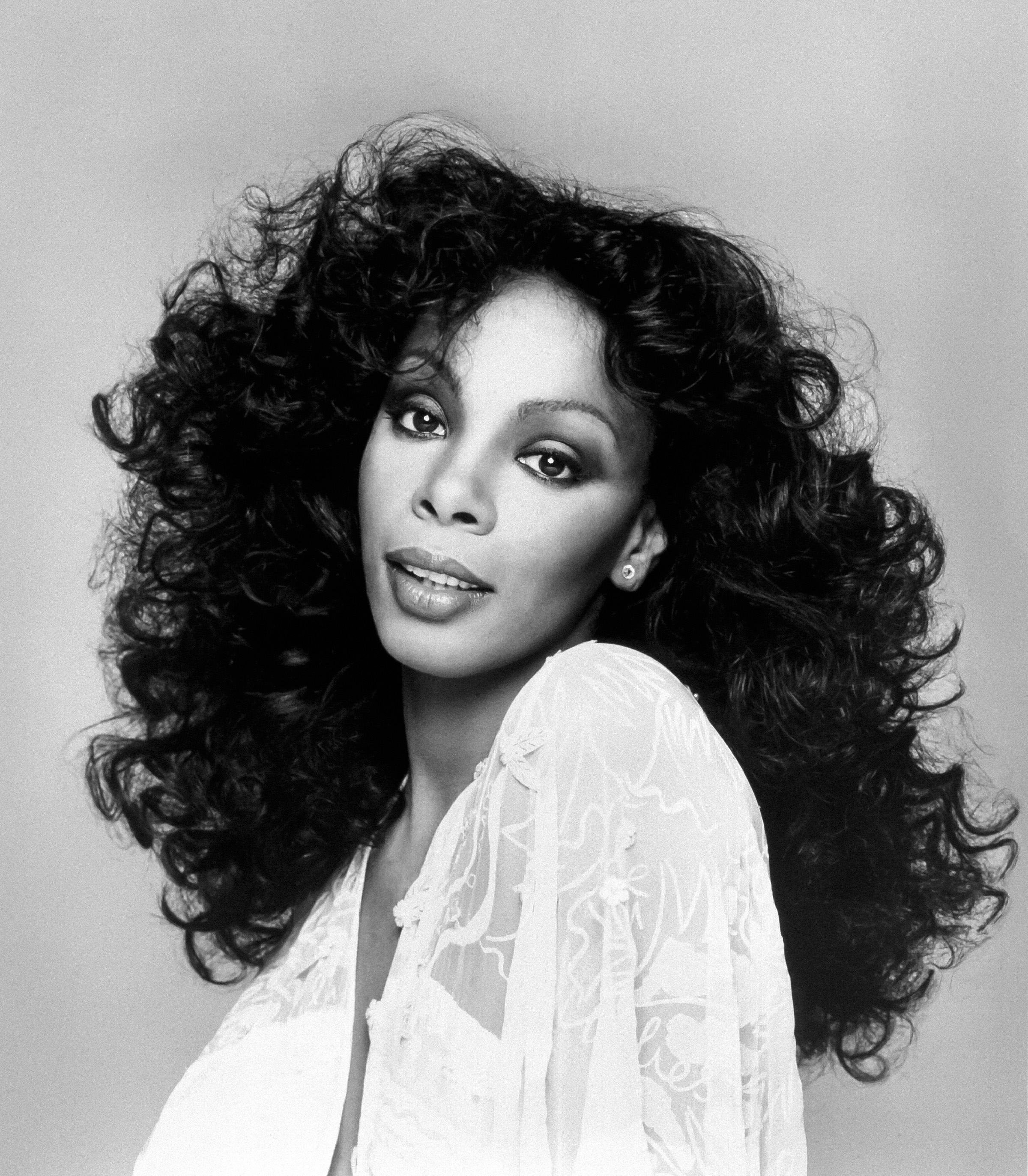
Donna Summer reached number one in Canada for the second time with her version of "MacArthur Park".

Chart history
Issue date	Title	Artist(s)	Ref.
January 7 (Note: Due to a week's break in publication for the 1977/1978 New Year period, the week of January 7 is inferred.)	"How Deep Is You Love"	Bee Gees	
January 14	"How Deep Is You Love"	Bee Gees	
January 21	"How Deep Is You Love"	Bee Gees	
January 28	"How Deep Is You Love"	Bee Gees	
February 4	"You're in My Heart (The Final Acclaim)"	Rod Stewart	
February 11	"Baby Come Back"	Player	
February 18	"Stayin' Alive"	Bee Gees	
February 25	"Stayin' Alive"	Bee Gees	
March 4	"Stayin' Alive"	Bee Gees	
March 11	"Stayin' Alive"	Bee Gees	
March 18	"Sometimes When We Touch"	Dan Hill	
March 25	"Emotion"	Samantha Sang	
April 1	"Night Fever"	Bee Gees	
April 8	"Night Fever"	Bee Gees	
April 15	"Night Fever"	Bee Gees	
April 22	"Night Fever"	Bee Gees	
April 29	"Night Fever"	Bee Gees	
May 6	"If I Can't Have You"	Yvonne Elliman	
May 13	"If I Can't Have You"	Yvonne Elliman	
May 20	"The Closer I Get to You"	Roberta Flack and Donny Hathaway	
May 27	"With a Little Luck"	Wings	
June 3	"With a Little Luck"	Wings	
June 10	"With a Little Luck"	Wings	
June 17	"Shadow Dancing"	Andy Gibb	
June 24	"Shadow Dancing"	Andy Gibb	
July 1	"Shadow Dancing"	Andy Gibb	
July 8	"It's a Heartache"	Bonnie Tyler	
July 15	"Baker Street"	Gerry Rafferty	
July 22	"Baker Street"	Gerry Rafferty	
July 29	"Baker Street"	Gerry Rafferty	
August 5	"Baker Street"	Gerry Rafferty	
August 12	"Miss You"	The Rolling Stones	
August 19	"Miss You"	The Rolling Stones	
August 26	"Three Times a Lady"	Commodores	
September 2	"Three Times a Lady"	Commodores	
September 9	"Three Times a Lady"	Commodores	
September 16	"Three Times a Lady"	Commodores	
September 23	"Grease"	Frankie Valli	
September 30	"Hopelessly Devoted to You"	Olivia Newton-John	
October 7	"Hopelessly Devoted to You"	Olivia Newton-John	
October 14	"Hot Child in the City"	Nick Gilder	
October 21	"Hot Child in the City"	Nick Gilder	
October 28	"You Needed Me"	Anne Murray	
November 4 (Note: No charts were published for the weeks of November 4 and 11, so these are inferred.)	"You Needed Me"	Anne Murray	
November 11	"You Needed Me"	Anne Murray	
November 18	"You Needed Me"	Anne Murray	
November 25	"MacArthur Park"	Donna Summer	
December 2	"MacArthur Park"	Donna Summer	
December 9	"You Don't Bring Me Flowers"	Barbra Streisand and Neil Diamond	
December 16	"You Don't Bring Me Flowers"	Barbra Streisand and Neil Diamond	
December 23	"You Don't Bring Me Flowers"	Barbra Streisand and Neil Diamond	
December 30	"I Just Wanna Stop"	Gino Vannelli	

== See also ==
- List of RPM number-one adult contemporary singles of 1978
- List of RPM number-one country singles of 1978
- List of RPM number-one dance singles of 1978
- List of Canadian number-one albums of 1978
- List of Billboard Hot 100 number ones of 1978
- List of Cashbox Top 100 number-one singles of 1978
