= List of Cash Box Top 100 number-one singles of 1978 =

These are the number-one singles of 1978 according to the Top 100 Singles in Cash Box Magazine

Key
The yellow background indicates the #1 song of 1978.

Issue date	Song	Artist
January 7	"How Deep Is Your Love"	Bee Gees
January 14	"Baby Come Back"	Player
January 21	"Baby Come Back"	Player
January 28	"Short People"	Randy Newman
February 4	"Stayin' Alive"	Bee Gees
February 11	"Stayin' Alive"	Bee Gees
February 18	"Stayin' Alive"	Bee Gees
February 25	"Stayin' Alive"	Bee Gees
March 4	"(Love Is) Thicker Than Water"	Andy Gibb
March 11	"Emotion"	Samantha Sang
March 18	"Night Fever"	Bee Gees
March 25	"Night Fever"	Bee Gees
April 1	"Night Fever"	Bee Gees
April 8	"Night Fever"	Bee Gees
April 15	"Night Fever"	Bee Gees
April 22	"Night Fever"	Bee Gees
April 29	"Night Fever"	Bee Gees
May 6	"Night Fever"	Bee Gees
May 13	"If I Can't Have You"	Yvonne Elliman
May 20	"With a Little Luck"	Paul McCartney & Wings
May 27	"With a Little Luck"	Paul McCartney & Wings
June 3	"Shadow Dancing"	Andy Gibb
June 10	"Shadow Dancing"	Andy Gibb
June 17	"Shadow Dancing"	Andy Gibb
June 24	"Shadow Dancing"	Andy Gibb
July 1	"Shadow Dancing"	Andy Gibb
July 8	"Shadow Dancing"	Andy Gibb
July 15	"Baker Street"	Gerry Rafferty
July 22	"Baker Street"	Gerry Rafferty
July 29	"Miss You"	Rolling Stones
August 5	"Miss You"	Rolling Stones
August 12	"Three Times A Lady"	Commodores
August 19	"Three Times A Lady"	Commodores
August 26	"Three Times A Lady"	Commodores
September 2	"Three Times A Lady"	Commodores
September 9	"Grease"	Frankie Valli
September 16	"Boogie Oogie Oogie"	A Taste Of Honey
September 23	"Boogie Oogie Oogie"	A Taste Of Honey
September 30	"Boogie Oogie Oogie"	A Taste Of Honey
October 7	"Kiss You All Over"	Exile
October 14	"Kiss You All Over"	Exile
October 21	"Hot Child In The City"	Nick Gilder
October 28	"Hot Child In The City"	Nick Gilder
November 4	"Hot Child In The City"	Nick Gilder
November 11	"MacArthur Park"	Donna Summer
November 18	"MacArthur Park"	Donna Summer
November 25	"You Don't Bring Me Flowers"	Barbra Streisand & Neil Diamond
December 2	"You Don't Bring Me Flowers"	Barbra Streisand & Neil Diamond
December 9	"You Don't Bring Me Flowers"	Barbra Streisand & Neil Diamond
December 16	"Le Freak"	Chic
December 23	"Le Freak"	Chic
December 30	"Le Freak"	Chic

== See also ==
- 1978 in music
- List of number-one hits (USA)
- Hot 100 number-one hits of 1978 (USA) by Billboard magazine
- RPM number-one hits of 1978 for the #1 hits in Canada
