= Sweeney Todd (Sweeney Todd album) =

Studio album by Sweeney Todd
- Released: 1975
- Genre: Glam rock
- Label: London
- Producer: Martin Shaer

Sweeney Todd chronology
Sweeney Todd (1975)	If Wishes Were Horses (1977)

Sweeney Todd is the debut album by Canadian glam rock band Sweeney Todd. The single "Roxy Roller" reached #1 in the RPM national singles survey on June 26, 1976, and held that position for three weeks. Singer Nick Gilder and guitarist Jim McCulloch later went on to solo careers. They have both since returned to the band.

== Track list ==
1. "Roxy Roller"
2. "Broadway Boogie"
3. "Juicy Loose"
4. "Short Distance, Long Journey"
5. "The Kilt" (instrumental)
6. "Rock'N'Roll Story"
7. "Sweeney Todd Folder"
8. "See What We're Doing Now"
9. "Daydreams"
10. "Rue De Chance"
11. "Let's Do It All Again"

== Personnel ==
- Nick Gilder: Lead Vocals
- Jim McCulloch: Guitar
- Dan Gaudin: Keyboards
- Budd Marr: Bass
- John Booth: Drums
- Rod Dirk: Engineer
- Martin Shaer: Producer

== Charts ==
=== Weekly charts ===
Chart (1976)	Peak position
Canada Top Albums/CDs (RPM)	19

=== Year-end charts ===
Chart (1976)	Position
Canada Top Albums/CDs (RPM)	23
