= Wide Awake in Dreamland =

- Cover photography by Moshe Brakha

Studio album by Pat Benatar
- Released: July 4, 1988
- Recorded: 1987
- Studios: Spyder's Soul Kitchen, Ocean Way Recording ("All Fired Up"), Los Angeles, California
- Genres: Rock, hard rock, glam metal
- Length: 50:12
- Label: Chrysalis
- Producers: Peter Coleman; Neil Giraldo; Keith Forsey ("All Fired Up")

Pat Benatar chronology
| Best Shots (1987) | Wide Awake in Dreamland (1988) | True Love (1991) |

Singles from Wide Awake in Dreamland
- 1. "All Fired Up" Released: June 17, 1988; 2. "Don't Walk Away" Released: September 27, 1988; 3. "Let's Stay Together" Released: December 19, 1988; 4. "One Love" Released: January 9, 1989 (EU)

Professional ratings
Review scores
| Source | Rating |
|---|---|
| AllMusic | 3/5 stars |
| Rolling Stone | 2/5 stars |

Wide Awake in Dreamland is the seventh studio album by American rock singer Pat Benatar, and her eighth album overall, released in 1988. After a string of successful albums, this was her last rock-oriented album of the 1980s, before she would go on to try a blues-based sound with True Love in 1991.

The album's lead single, "All Fired Up", peaked at number 19 on the Billboard Hot 100 and number 25 on the Cash Box Top 100. It was nominated for a Grammy Award but did not win.

The album was certified Gold by the RIAA.

== Background and writing ==
The album was primarily recorded at Neil Giraldo's studio, with most of the songwriting by Giraldo and longtime drummer Myron Grombacher. Four of the tracks are also co-written with Benatar (who is credited as Pat Giraldo). One of the two songs from other songwriters was "Cerebral Man" written by Tully Winfield and well-known stick player Don Schiff. In an interview from 2002, Schiff recalled how this track was added to the album: "Tully Winfield and I demoed songs at what was becoming a very popular studio in LA (Woodcliff Studio)... we had just recorded "Cerebral Man". If I recall correctly the demo just had Tully's voice, stick and drums. Peter Coleman was producing Pat's next album for Chrysalis and happened to be the next session in and heard the tune. He asked if he could take the song to Pat Benatar and hopefully put it on her next album. Her camp liked it and they did a wonderful job with the song. I thought Tully and I would get a few more songs on that album as they liked the style of our song, but at the last minute she decided to go back to her more familiar rock style, leaving our song the only one stylistically like it on the album."

== Critical reception ==
Cashbox said that the album showcased "a mix of hard rockers and heartfelt ballads" with "more than a little social consciousness mixed in." They highlighted the title track as a "real showcase for hubby Neil Geraldo's guitar" and characterized "Let's Stay Together" as "a terrifically rappy metal number." Billboard commented on the stylistic variety of the album and called it a "soup-to-nuts bag of hits guaranteed to move in large numbers."

== Track listing ==
Side one
| No. | Title | Writer(s) | Length |
|---|---|---|---|
| 1. | "All Fired Up" | Kerryn Tolhurst | 4:27 |
| 2. | "One Love" | Neil Giraldo, Myron Grombacher | 5:12 |
| 3. | "Let's Stay Together" | Pat Benatar, Giraldo | 4:50 |
| 4. | "Don't Walk Away" | Nick Gilder, Duane Hitchings | 4:35 |
| 5. | "Too Long a Soldier" | Giraldo, Grombacher | 6:42 |

Side two
| No. | Title | Writer(s) | Length |
|---|---|---|---|
| 6. | "Cool Zero" | Giraldo, Grombacher | 5:26 |
| 7. | "Cerebral Man" | Don Schiff, Tully Winfield | 4:40 |
| 8. | "Lift 'em on Up" | Benatar, Giraldo, Grombacher | 4:54 |
| 9. | "Suffer the Little Children" | Benatar, Giraldo | 4:10 |
| 10. | "Wide Awake in Dreamland" | Giraldo, Grombacher | 4:58 |

== Personnel ==
=== Musicians ===
- Pat Benatar – vocals
- Neil Giraldo – guitars
- Myron Grombacher – drums
- Fernando Saunders – bass
- Frank Linx – bass, background vocals
- Charles Giordano, Kevin Savigar – keyboards
- Bo Castro – percussion
- Nick Gilder – background vocals on "Don't Walk Away" and "Cool Zero"
- Carmen Twillie, Phyllis St. James, Maxine Water – background vocals on "Lift 'em on Up"

=== Production ===
- Peter Coleman, Neil Giraldo – producers, mixing
- Frank Linx – assistant engineer
- Steve Ford, Gil Morales – mixing assistants
- George Marino – mastering at Sterling Sound, New York

"All Fired Up"

- Keith Forsey – producer
- Paul Lini – engineer
- Clif Norrell – assistant engineer
- Chris Lord-Alge – mixing at The Hit Factory, New York
- Tim Leitner – mixing assistant

"Let's Stay Together"

- Neil Giraldo – producer
- Ed Thacker – mixing
- Jim Dineen – mixing assistant

== Charts ==
=== Weekly charts ===
Weekly chart performance for Wide Awake in Dreamland
| Chart (1988) | Peak position |
|---|---|
| Australian Albums (ARIA) | 13 |
| Canada Top Albums/CDs (RPM) | 11 |
| European Albums (Music & Media) | 36 |
| Finnish Albums (Suomen virallinen lista) | 17 |
| German Albums (Offizielle Top 100) | 47 |
| New Zealand Albums (RMNZ) | 15 |
| Swedish Albums (Sverigetopplistan) | 33 |
| UK Albums (Official Charts) | 11 |
| US Billboard 200 | 28 |

=== Year-end charts ===
Year-end chart performance for Wide Awake in Dreamland
| Chart (1988) | Position |
|---|---|
| Canada Top Albums/CDs (RPM) | 53 |
| US Billboard 200 | 97 |

== Certifications ==
Certifications for Wide Awake In Dreamland
| Region | Certification | Certified units/sales |
|---|---|---|
| Canada (Music Canada) | Platinum | 100,000^{^} |
| United Kingdom (BPI) | Gold | 100,000^{^} |
| United States (RIAA) | Gold | 500,000^{^} |
^{^} Shipments figures based on certification alone.
