= You Know Who You Are =

You Know Who You Are may refer to:

- You Know Who You Are (Nick Gilder album), 1977
- You Know Who You Are (Nada Surf album), 2015
