= Watseka Wonder =

Alleged spiritual possession

Watseka Wonder is the name given to the alleged spiritual possession of fourteen-year-old Lurancy Vennum of Watseka, Illinois in the late 19th century.

== Lurancy Vennum ==
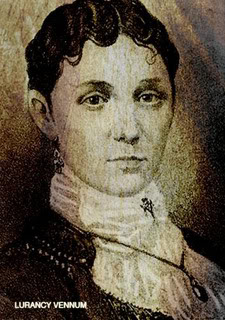
Lurancy Vennum

Mary Lurancy Vennum was born in 1864 near Watseka, Illinois. In the summer of 1877 she suffered a series of epileptic fits, often lapsing into unconsciousness. After awakening, she told her family that she had been to heaven, had seen angels, and had visited her younger brother and sister who had died before her. As Vennum's fits became more frequent, physicians advised there was nothing more they could do, and by January 1878 it was decided she should be placed in an insane asylum. A neighbor and devout Spiritist Asa B. Roff convinced Vennum's parents not to commit her, and instead to call in a physician who was himself a Spiritist, E. Winchester Stevens.

== Spiritist investigation ==
In 1878, physician and Spiritist E. Winchester Stevens examined Vennum. Stevens’s accounts were published in the leading Spiritist journal of the time, The Religio-Philosophical Journal, and later in an 1887 book entitled The Watseka Wonder in which he described Vennum as "the most remarkable case of spirit return and manifestation ever recorded in history." According to Stevens, Vennum's character would change suddenly, from morose and sullen, to "mystic and imaginary trances" in which she described joyous trips to heaven and visits with angels. According to Stevens, Vennum often spoke in different voices and became several different people, including an old woman named Katrina Hogan and a young man named Willie Canning. Stevens claims she remembered the names of several people who had died and had possessed her body, and later chose to be possessed by the soul of Asa Roff's deceased daughter, Mary Roff. Psychical researcher Richard Hodgson of the American Society for Psychical Research was also convinced that Vennum was possessed by Roff's spirit.

William James briefly mentioned the case in his book The Principles of Psychology (1890). James commented that it is "perhaps as extreme a case of 'possession' of the modern sort as one can find."

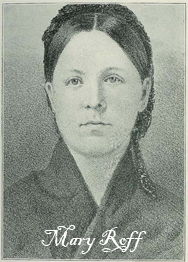
Mary Roff

According to Stevens and Hodgson, Vennum allowed Mary Roff to possess her body for about fifteen weeks during which time she could allegedly recognize all Roff's friends and relatives, was familiar with all of the objects in the Roff home, and could retell incidents and stories from Roff's childhood and her past life. Convinced that Vennum was a reincarnation of their daughter, the Roff family allowed the girl to live with them for several weeks. Stevens wrote that when Vennum later married, Roff's spirit supposedly inhabited Vennum, resulting in a painless childbirth for her.

== Critics ==
Upon reviewing the case, psychologist Frank Sargent Hoffman regarded Vennum as "a typical case of hysterical impersonation" and wrote that there was no evidence Vennum had knowledge she could not have obtained by normal means. Hoffman wrote that the grieving Roff family "did everything in their power" to encourage Vennum "that she was their Mary." Journalist Henry Addington Bruce characterized Vennum as "unduly suggestible", saying that "it may safely be declared that the phenomena manifested through Lurancy Vennum were not a whit more other-worldly than the phenomena produced by tricksters whom Hodgson himself so skillfully and mercifully exposed." Bruce wrote that recurrences of the "Mary personality" appeared "only when the Roffs paid her visits, and that they ceased entirely upon her marriage to a man not interested in spiritism and her removal to a distant part of the country."

== Adaptations ==
An obscure syndicated radio program, Out of the Night, dramatized the case as "The Girl With the Dual Personality" sometime around 1949, a recording of which survives.

DC Comics' horror anthology, House of Mystery (#5, August 1952), had a half-page filler titled, "Double Mourning!" that briefly recounted the alleged facts of the Lurancy Vennum case.

Before I Wake, a fictionalized play by William Wesbrooks, was based on the case, and was produced and staged in 1986. It focused on the Roffs, who were the writer's great-great-grandparents. The play was reviewed as a thriller by The New York Times.

Writer Melissa Pritchard based her story "Spirit Seizures" on Lurancy Vennum. It is the titular story in her collection Spirit Seizures which won the Flannery O'Connor Award for Short Fiction and was published by University of Georgia Press in 1987.

The 1996 television movie Buried Secrets is an adaption of the story.

A 2009 film, The Possessed, recounting the story of the Watseka case, was produced by the Booth Brothers, Christopher Saint Booth and Philip Adrian Booth, for the SyFy Channel's "Spooked Television". Since then, the film has aired on The Chiller Channel on June 10, 2012, owned by the same network of channels as SyFy.

Daniel Quinn used the event as the basis for the story of Mary Anne Dorson in his novel After Dachau.

In the 2021 Travel Channel series, Ghost Brothers, Mary Roff's former house is investigated for her lingering spirit.

== See also ==
- Great Amherst Mystery
- Walk-in
