= Frequency (Nick Gilder album) =

Studio album by Nick Gilder
- Released: 1979
- Studio: MCA Whitney Recording Studios, Glendale, California
- Genre: Rock, Pop, Power Pop
- Label: Chrysalis
- Producer: Peter Coleman

Nick Gilder chronology
City Nights (1978)	Frequency (1979)	Rock America (1980)

Professional ratings
Review scores
Source	Rating
AllMusic	3/5 stars

Frequency by Nick Gilder was released in 1979 on the Chrysalis record label.

In a 1979 review for the Birmingham Daily Post, Jonathan Daümler-Ford commented on "Gilder's annoying high vocals and the outstanding guitar work of James McCulloch".

== Track listing ==
All tracks composed by Nick Gilder and James McCulloch.

1. "(You Really) Rock Me" 2:45
2. "Time After Time" 4:21
3. "Metro Jets" 4:05
4. "Electric Love" 3:10
5. "The Brightest Star" 3:35
6. "Watcher of the Night" 3:41
7. "Worlds Collide" 4:54
8. "Hold on Me Tonight" 6:02
9. "Into the 80's" 2:53

== Personnel ==
- Nick Gilder - vocals
- James McCulloch - lead guitar, guitar synthesizer
- Eric Nelson - bass, backing vocals
- Craig Krampf - drums, percussion
- Jamie Herndon - guitar, synthesizer, backing vocals

== Charts ==
Chart (1978)	Peak position
US Billboard 200	127
