= AlleyBrat =

Canadian-American glam rock band

- Origin: Vancouver, British Columbia
- Genres: Glam rock, Hard rock
- Years active: 1979-1982
- Labels: Bratman Records; Spooked Music Releasing
- Members: Philip Booth; Christopher Booth; Brian West; Steve Carlson
- Past members: Barry Muir; Brian East; David Omstead; Randy Parr; Ric Haugin; Roger Halvorson

AlleyBrat were a Canadian-American band formed in 1979 by Christopher Booth, Philip Booth, Randy Parr, Barry Muir and David Omstead (aka Bud Omstead) in Vancouver, British Columbia, often touring across Canada, becoming well known in the glam rock and hard rock scene. AlleyBrat began after the dissolving of Sweeney Todd in 1979, with Christopher and Philip re-grouping to create the band and continue Sweeney Todd's journey and fan base.

== Origin ==
The band's name came about because, when Chris and Phil were children, they used to spend all their time out on the streets, and people would call them the "Alley Brats."

== Overview ==
=== Canada-Alaska Tour (1979-1980) ===
AlleyBrat was formed in Vancouver, British Columbia in 1979 after the fracturing of Sweeney Todd and side project music project Rags that same year, the founding members were: Christopher Booth, Philip Booth, Barry Muir, Randy Parr and David Omstead (also refereed to as Bud Omstead). During AlleyBrat's early days, their work mainly consisted of AC/DC covers and Sweeney Todd songs, doing live shows in the Vancouver area and around Canada, becoming well known in the Glam Rock music scene. Despite the good reception of AlleyBrat in its early days, Chris and Phil moved to Seattle, Washington, in early 1980, ending AlleyBrat's tour.

=== AlleyBrat's First Single (1980) ===
After relocating in Seattle in february 1980, AlleyBrat regrouped with a new presentation and style resonant of Clockwork Orange, helping them stand out in the wave of new styles and artists. This era of AlleyBrat featured Christopher Booth, Philip Booth, Brian East and Steve Carlson, eventually leading to big artists like Mötley Crüe opening their shows. Brian East met the brothers through a drummer who auditioned for a bar band he played in. AlleyBrat’s first public live performance in Seattle took place on March 27, 1980, the same day Mount St. Helens erupted. Likely before Steve Carlson joined the band since he joined later. It was held at a private party using borrowed equipment, where the only song played was a demo of "My Description Of You." a song about a man having fantazies about a fictional girl.

In June 1980, AlleyBrat released their first single "It's The Wave / My Description Of You", which was received well in the community. The single was recorded at Thuder Oak Studio in mid 1980. For both songs, drummer Ric Haugin was chosen instead of Steve Carlson, however, although Carlson did not play drums on those tracks, he was credited regardless. Keyboardist Roger Halvorson, who also worked for Roland, was invited to contribute as a session musician to the song using a Roland RS-202 Strings synthesizer (manufactured in 1976), an instrument he would later gift to the band.

During this period, the New Wave and Pop musical genres began to take shape and gain popularity. AlleyBrat maintained that this music was not good, so Christopher and Philip wrote "It's The Wave", a song about how New Wave was a bad genre. After releasing the first AlleyBrat single, Philip began describing the band as "rock and roll with a touch of the future." AlleyBrat also claimed that their mission was to save rock and roll from New Wave, asserting that the genre was dying because of it.

Frank Forman became AlleyBrat’s manager in summer of 1980 after Brian East called him and introduced him to the band, through his dad who worked with Frank previously. Brian told him that he was part of a rock group called AlleyBrat and that they had recorded a single. The band had also been selling their equipment to make money. Frank agreed to meet the members. After meeting them and listening to their music, Frank recognized their talent and decided to help them. He used his experience in sales and marketing to promote the band and find opportunities for them. He eventually developed an interest in managing AlleyBrat. They had already invested nearly $75,000 in the project. Despite the financial risks, he believed the band had commercial potential. Frank Forman took the band to Bellevue High School for the state DECA convention to test whether or not they were any good. A survey was conducted, and 58% of the 600 students who watched the performance thought they were good, and 45% said they would like to buy a record. They were sold a copy of the single "It's The Wave / My Description Of You", described as a "promo disc", which included a photo of the band and the survey results.

=== AlleyBrat's Second Single (1981) ===
In 1981, throughout all the good reception AlleyBrat was gaining, there was a noticeable group of people who were against AlleyBrat, mostly due to their clothing and music not fitting in with new 1980s trends. An official AlleyBrat Fan Club was made by AlleyBrat's costume designer Lori Tucker around the same time. This became more evident with the release of their second single Singing In The Rain / We Are The Future, which featured a cover of Gene Kelly's song "Singing In The Rain", coming from the Triad Studio sessions. The band covered "Singin' in the Rain" because it appeared in the film A Clockwork Orange, and they were obsessed with the movie, creating a hard rock version of the song. The original demo featured a different ending, where the track faded out into original song. "We Are the Future" is a song with lyrics heavily inspired by A Clockwork Orange, while the instrumentation, according to the band, is influenced by Queen. The song also revisits the theme of the band’s mission to save rock music. The original demo had different lyrics. Frank contacted American Variety International, a Hollywood company, and sent them a copy of the single and the company’s president, Seymour Heller, was impressed and snet a letter to Frank to make a demo tape, so they started working on it, the demo tape featured both songs from their second single and two new songs, "Livin' On A Capsule" and "She's An Invader", which were also recorded on Triad Studios. A copy of the demo tape was sent to Seymour and other copies were sent to the band members. The tape also had "Singing In The Rain" with its original ending. Seymour after getting the tape said that Chris and Phil were really talented.

On February 20 and 21, 1981, the band played live at The Showbox, the show was opened by the band "The Cor". Frank Forman, invested $250,000 in advertising for the event, but the audience was so mad, as the show was not what they had expected and failed to meet their expectations, that they went as far as damaging the band’s posters and singles. This is the AlleyBrat show with the highest number of confirmed songs performed, they are as follows: "Singin' in the Rain," "We Are the Future," a 10-minute medley of AC/DC covers dedicated to Bon Scott, a song dedicated to John Lennon (likely a cover of "Imagine" or "Modern Hero", an article refers to the track as an original, and its the closest matches), "Fashion Shock," and "Love on Mars."

=== Relocation to California (1981) ===
In March 1, 1981, they sold copies of their second single at Everett Community College, then later that month, the band relocated to Van Nuys, California. In March 16, 1981, the band was rehearsing at the venue the "Woodstock" and they found out the band U2 was performing at the same place that same day, so after their rehearsals they went to watch them and chris said only 14 people were watching the performance. In June, Brian East was removed from the band because Steve Carlson thought he was an inferior musician, leaving Brian to join Savage Grace, with Chris taking over the role of bass.

Later that year, AlleyBrat began recording new songs for an album and a European tour, but both were ultimately cancelled.

In October 1981 the songs "Love In Space", "Memory Banks", "Drop" (Also known as "Drop All Your Neutron Bombs") and "I Live Sci-Fi" (Also known as "I Live In Sci-Fi Movies") were recorded at the studio Stone Fox Rehearsal Studio in Hollywood, Los Angeles. These songs were added to a reel-to-reel tape. Later in December 1981 they recorded at the same studio the songs "Modern Hero", "To Sir With Love" and "One Last Look" and were feature to reel-to-reel tapes and cassettes that were duplicated in 1982 at the, now difunct, tape duplication company Project One A/V. These tapes were previously never released to the public, but have since been released from 2024-2026 via Christopher and Philip Booth’s “Lost Album” series (Released under Who’s Who?). After Frank Forman left the band, Marko Van Der Werff, their guitar technician and engineer, turned into their road manager.

=== End of the Band (1982) ===
In AlleyBrat's final year, the band recruited bassist Brian West, from the metal band London, through a newspaper ad in which they announced they were looking for a bass player who could sing, and Rick Knutson would turn into their new road manager, leaving them to take over a new rock sound, recording songs like "Ain't No Way" at the Troubadour, leaving behind the glam and punk look of the late 1970s and very early 1980s. After this change, Steve Carlson left the band to join the local band "REDAX" in late 1982. This radical change in style caused the end of AlleyBrat, and the band to reform as Affair.

== Members ==
Last known Line-up

- Christopher Saint Booth - Vocals, Bass, Piano, Keyboards & Trumpet (1979–1982)
- Philip Adrian Booth - Guitars & Backing Vocals (1979–1982)
- Brian West - Bass (1982)
- Steve Carlson - Drums (1980–1982)

Former members

- Brian East - Bass (1980–1981)
- Rick Knutson - Tambourine & Timpani (1981)
- Ric Haugin - Drums (1980)
- Roger Halvorson - Keyboards (1980)
- Barry Muir - Bass (1979–1980)
- Randy Parr - Keyboards (1979–1980)
- David "Bud" Omstead - Drums (1979–1980)

== Studios ==
- Thunder Oak Audio - Bothell, Washington (1980).
- Triad Studios - Redmond, Washington (1981).
- Stone Fox Rehearsal Studio - North Hollywood, Los Angeles (1981)

== Discography ==
=== Singles ===
Title	Released
It's The Wave / My Description Of You	June 1980
Singing In The Rain / We Are The Future	January 1981

=== Songs ===
Year recorded	Title	Label	Released
1980	It's The Wave	Bratman Records (1980) Spooked Music Releasing (2026)	Released
1980	My Description Of You	Bratman Records (1980) Spooked Music Releasing (2026)	Released
1980	Never Forgive Or Forget	N/A	Unreleased
1980	Life Is A Reel	N/A	Unreleased
1980	I'll Fight For You	N/A	Unreleased
1980	Me And The Boys	N/A	Unreleased
1981	Love On Mars	N/A	Unreleased
1981	Imagine	N/A	Unreleased
1981	Fashion Shock	N/A	Unreleased
1981	She's An Invader	N/A	Unreleased
1981	We Are The Future	Bratman Records (1981) Spooked Music Releasing (2025)	Released
1981	Livin' On A Capsule	N/A	Unreleased
1981	Singing In The Rain	Bratman Records (1981) Spooked Music Releasing (2025)	Released
1981	Memory Banks	Spooked Music Releasing (2026)	Released
1981	Drop All Your Neutron Bombs	N/A	Unreleased
1981	Love In Space	Spooked Music Releasing (2025 & 2026)	Released
1981	I Live In Sci-Fi Movies	N/A	Unreleased
1981	Modern Hero/Modern Heroe	Spooked Music Releasing (2025 & 2026)	Released
1981	To Sir With Love	Spooked Music Releasing (2025)	Released
1981	One Last Look	Spooked Music Releasing (2024 & 2026)	Released
1981	Goodbye Girl Spy	N/A	Unreleased
1981	Robot In Love	N/A	Unreleased
1982	I Love Luci	N/A	Unreleased
1982	I'm Dressing Up Tonight	N/A	Unreleased
1982	Ain't No Way	Spooked Music Releasing (2026)	Released (Live recording)
1982	Love Suit	N/A	Unreleased

== Gigography ==
Date	Venue
Canada Dates
Novemeber 1979	Park Hotel (Red Deer, Alberta, Canada)
Novemeber 12, 1979	Southwood Motor Hotel, "Southwood Tavern" (Winnipeg, Manitoba, Canada)
November 19, 1979	Selkirk Motor Hotel (Selkirk, Manitoba, Canada)
November 20, 1979	Selkirk Motor Hotel (Selkirk, Manitoba, Canada)
November 21, 1979	Selkirk Motor Hotel (Selkirk, Manitoba, Canada)
November 22, 1979	Selkirk Motor Hotel (Selkirk, Manitoba, Canada)
November 23, 1979	Selkirk Motor Hotel (Selkirk, Manitoba, Canada)
November 24, 1979	Selkirk Motor Hotel (Selkirk, Manitoba, Canada)
December 3, 1979	Winnipeg (Canada)
December 8 or 9, 1979	The Wind Sorian (Winnipeg Canada)
December 19,1979	Southwood Motor Hotel (Winnipeg, Manitoba, Canada)
1979/1980	Windsor Park Motor Hotel (Winnipeg, Manitoba, Canada)
January 15, 1980	Foxy's Cabaret (Whitehorse, Yukon Territory, Canada)
January 18, 1980	Foxy's Cabaret (Whitehorse, Yukon Territory, Canada)
January 19, 1980	Foxy's Cabaret (Whitehorse, Yukon Territory, Canada)
USA Dates
March 27, 1980	Private Party (Seattle, Washington USA) (AlleyBrat's first public appearance in USA)
August 8, 1980	Natacha's Pavilion (Bremerton, Washington, USA)
September 7, 1980	Ad Lib Tavern (Kent, Washington, USA)
October 1980 (State DECA convention)	Bellevue High School (King County, Washington, USA)
1980/81	Bainbridge Island (Washington, USA)
January 31, 1981	SUB Ballroom (Central Washington University, Ellensburg, Washington, USA) (CANCELLED)
February 5, 1981	"Black Dog" (Spokane, Washington, USA)
February 9, 1981	Spokane Falls Community College Auditorium (Spokane, Washington, USA)
February 14, 1981	Whitworth University Memorial Auditorium (Spokane, Washington, USA) (CANCELLED)
February 20, 1981	The Showbox (Seattle, Washington, USA)
February 21, 1981	The Showbox (Seattle, Washington, USA)
February 27, 1981	Everett Community College (Everett, Washington, USA)
February 28, 1981 (JAFCO Public Appearance)	Everett Showroom Community College (Everett, Washington, USA)
May 26, 1981	The Troubadour (West Hollywood, California USA)
August 9, 1981	The Troubadour (West Hollywood, California USA)
August 13, 1981	The Troubadour (West Hollywood, California USA)
October 11, 1981	The Troubadour (West Hollywood, California USA)
October 13, 1981	The Troubadour (West Hollywood, California USA)
October 14, 1981	The Troubadour (West Hollywood, California USA)
November 12, 1981	The Troubadour (West Hollywood, California USA)
1981	The Starwood (West Hollywood, California, USA)
1982	The Troubadour (West Hollywood, California USA)
