= City Nights =

Studio album by Nick Gilder
- Released: 1978
- Studios: Larrabee, Los Angeles; MCA Whitney, Glendale, California
- Genre: Pop rock
- Label: Chrysalis
- Producers: Mike Chapman, Peter Coleman

Nick Gilder chronology
You Know Who You Are (1977)	City Nights (1978)	Frequency (1979)

City Nights is an album by Nick Gilder, released in 1978 on Chrysalis Records.

== Critical reception ==
Professional ratings
Review scores
Source	Rating
AllMusic	4/5 stars

The Globe and Mail wrote that Gilder's "hit single, 'Hot Child in the City', which appears on this album, sums up most of what he has to offer—titillating lyrics, simple, formula melodies, derivative zooming guitars and percussive rhythms so basic they verge on the moronic."

== Track listing ==
All tracks composed by Nick Gilder and James McCulloch.

1. "Got to Get Out"
2. "We'll Work It Out"
3. "(She's) One of the Boys"
4. "All Because of Love"
5. "Hot Child in the City"
6. "Frustration"
7. "Here Comes the Night"
8. "21st Century"
9. "Fly High"
10. "Rockaway"

== Personnel ==
- Nick Gilder – vocals
- James Herndon – guitar, synthesizer, vocals
- Craig Krampf – drums, percussion, vocals
- Eric Nelson – bass, keyboards, vocals
- James McCulloch – guitar

== Charts ==
Chart (1978)	Peak position
Canadian Albums (RPM)	13
US Billboard 200	33
