= Droid (film) =

1988 straight-to-video sci-fi film

- VHS box cover
- Directed by: "Peter Williams" (Philip O'Toole)
- Written by: Nacada O'Toole; Christopher Saint Booth
- Produced by: Nacada O'Toole; Christopher Saint Booth
- Starring: Greg Derek; Krista Lane; Steven Densmore; Kevin James; Kristara Barrington; Herschel Savage
- Cinematography: Sly Burns
- Edited by: Steven Arthur
- Music by: Cinema Symphony's
- Production company: Even Steven Productions
- Distributed by: Even Steven Productions
- Release date: 1988
- Running time: 63 minutes (edited from 85 minute hardcore version)
- Country: United States
- Language: English

Droid is a 1988 direct to video science fiction film. Its origins are intentionally obscured on its packaging, crediting direction of the film to "British director Peter Williams" and the starring roles of Taylor to "Kevin Jean" and his ex-wife Nicola to "Raquel Rios" on the front cover and Rebecca Lynn on the back cover. The end credits reveal that these roles are played by Greg Derek and Krista Lane. The film is, in fact, an edited version of a hardcore pornographic film called Cabaret Sin (originally released July 1, 1987) marketed to a science fiction audience, and its director is actually Philip O'Toole, from a screenplay with Nacada O'Toole and Christopher Saint Booth. The film was released on VHS by Even Steven Productions and bore a stamped decal warning of sexual situations, nudity, violence, and adult language, although the film has no MPAA rating. The storyline is an imitation of Blade Runner, while one character is blatantly modeled on Anthony Daniels as C-3PO. The executive producer is Kirdy Stevens.

== Plot ==
In Los Angeles in 2020, the crime rate is up 200%. The police are known as Eliminators, and they fight against the Droid Warriors of Azteca (Lorrie Lovett), who dresses in Nazi regalia. The Droid were created as servants, and Taylor has one, Rochester (played by Kevin James, in a very close approximation of Daniel's speech patterns). Taylor, who was once the best Eliminator but more than anything wants to get back with his ex-wife, Nicola, is blackmailed into attempting to steal a digital decoder to shut down Azteca's forces. Much of Taylor's time, however, is spent at a club watching various sexual couplings featuring adult film stars such as Herschel Savage, Bunny Bleu (as Tammy Dorsey, who masturbates with a trombone), Candie Evans, Tom Byron, Keisha, and Kristara Barrington. Third-billed is an assassin called the Blade (Steven Densmore) who is hired by a man he interrupts masturbating.

Eventually, Taylor's apartment is attacked while he is in the shower, and his Droid goes haywire. He gets the decoder and uses it, and is reunited with Nicola. Azteca is not really destroyed however and "to be continued" looms.

== Production ==
The original score is credited to "Cinema Symphony's" [sic] and is claimed to have been released on Motion Records. The packaging claims that the film is "a rollercoaster ride of special effects, award winning cinematography, and original motion picture soundtrack." No mention is made of what awards, if any, its cinematography (credited to Sly Burns) received.

The only non-background characters who do not engage in sexual situations in the edited version are Rochester and the Blade (whose end credits billing is much lower than his billing on the box or opening credits). The Taylors' sex scene is almost subliminal—several minutes spent on the two characters just slow dancing with flash cuts to their romantic lovemaking. Presumably, in the uncut version, the dancing and sex were given closer to equal weight.

One character is a virgin pleasure model that is threatened with termination for being a virgin. Taylor agrees to have sex with her after she says, "you're not married, are you?" another blatant moment revealing the film's pornographic origins.

== Reception ==
Adult Video News praised Cabaret Sin for "time and effort (and apparently money)" put into the production. It mentions the plot's similarities to Blade Runner but says that aesthetically it is more comparable to Mad Max Beyond Thunderdome and Star Wars, as well as Café Flesh. It described the film as a mood piece with hardcore missionary and oral sex. It assessed the film as "definitely worth a look," and that response probably led to it being edited for mainstream release.

== See also ==
- List of mainstream movies with unsimulated sex
