= You Know Who You Are (Nick Gilder album) =

Studio album by Nick Gilder
- Released: 1977
- Recorded: Producers' Workshop, Los Angeles
- Genre: Rock, pop
- Length: 33:35
- Label: Chrysalis
- Producer: Stuart Alan Love, Nick Gilder, Martin Shaer, Peter Sullivan

Nick Gilder chronology
You Know Who You Are (1977)	City Nights (1978)

Professional ratings
Review scores
Source	Rating
AllMusic	4/5 stars

You Know Who You Are is the first solo album by Nick Gilder, released in 1977 on Chrysalis Records.

The track "Roxy Roller" was originally recorded by Gilder's band Sweeney Todd in 1975.

== Track listing ==
All songs were written by Nick Gilder and James McCulloch.

Side one

1. "All Across the Nation (The Wheels Are Rolling)" – 4:08
2. "Backstreet Noise" – 3:03
3. "Rated ‘X’" – 3:06
4. "Poor Boy" – 3:00
5. "Genevieve" – 3:23

Side two

1. "Runaways in the Night" – 3:08
2. "Roxy Roller" – 3:09 ♦
3. "Amanda Greer" – 3:19
4. "Tantalize" – 4:08
5. "Fond Farewell" – 3:11

♦ Included only in the US release. The album's third track (“Rated ‘X’”), was recorded by Pat Benatar for her 1979 debut album In the Heat of the Night.

== Personnel ==
- Nick Gilder - vocals
- James McCulloch - guitar
- Eric Nelson - bass
- Chet McCracken - drums, percussion
- Steve Halter - keyboards, synthesizer

with:

- Jean Roussel - keyboards, synthesizer on "Poor Boy", "Amanda Greer" and "Fond Farewell"
- Don Ellis - trumpet on "All Across the Nation (The Wheels Are Rolling)"; trombone on "Amanda Greer"
- Nick DeCaro - string arrangement on "Tantalize"
