= List of Canadian number-one albums of 1978 =

These are the Canadian number-one albums of 1978 as compiled by RPM.

Issue date	Album	Artist
January 7	You Light Up My Life	Debby Boone
January 14	You Light Up My Life	Debby Boone
January 21	You Light Up My Life	Debby Boone
January 28	Rumours	Fleetwood Mac
February 4	Foot Loose & Fancy Free	Rod Stewart
February 11	Foot Loose & Fancy Free	Rod Stewart
February 18	Saturday Night Fever	Soundtrack
February 25	Saturday Night Fever	Soundtrack
March 4	Saturday Night Fever	Soundtrack
March 11	Saturday Night Fever	Soundtrack
March 18	Saturday Night Fever	Soundtrack
March 25	Saturday Night Fever	Soundtrack
April 1	Saturday Night Fever	Soundtrack
April 8	Saturday Night Fever	Soundtrack
April 15	Saturday Night Fever	Soundtrack
April 22	Saturday Night Fever	Soundtrack
April 29	Saturday Night Fever	Soundtrack
May 6	Saturday Night Fever	Soundtrack
May 13	Saturday Night Fever	Soundtrack
May 20	Saturday Night Fever	Soundtrack
May 27	Saturday Night Fever	Soundtrack
June 3	Saturday Night Fever	Soundtrack
June 10	Saturday Night Fever	Soundtrack
June 17	Saturday Night Fever	Soundtrack
June 24	Saturday Night Fever	Soundtrack
July 1	Saturday Night Fever	Soundtrack
July 8	Saturday Night Fever	Soundtrack
July 15	Saturday Night Fever	Soundtrack
July 22	City to City	Gerry Rafferty
July 29	Shadow Dancing	Andy Gibb
August 5	Some Girls	The Rolling Stones
August 12	Grease	Soundtrack
August 19	Grease	Soundtrack
August 26	Grease	Soundtrack
September 2	Grease	Soundtrack
September 9	Grease	Soundtrack
September 16	Grease	Soundtrack
September 23	Grease	Soundtrack
September 30	Grease	Soundtrack
October 7	Don't Look Back	Boston
October 14	Don't Look Back	Boston
October 21	Don't Look Back	Boston
October 28	Let's Keep It That Way	Anne Murray
November 4	Let's Keep It That Way	Anne Murray
November 11	Let's Keep It That Way	Anne Murray
November 18	Let's Keep It That Way	Anne Murray
November 25	Let's Keep It That Way	Anne Murray
December 2	Let's Keep It That Way	Anne Murray
December 9	Elvis: A Canadian Tribute	Elvis Presley
December 16	52nd Street	Billy Joel
December 23	52nd Street	Billy Joel
December 30	52nd Street	Billy Joel

== See also ==
- List of Canadian number-one singles of 1978
