= Don't Walk Away (Pat Benatar song) =

1988 single by Pat Benatar

Single by Pat Benatar

from the album Wide Awake in Dreamland
- B-side: "Lift 'em on Up"
- Released: 1988
- Studio: Spyder's Soul Kitchen (Los Angeles, CA)
- Length: 4:35 (album version); 4:10 (single version)
- Label: Chrysalis
- Songwriters: Nick Gilder; Duane Hitchings
- Producers: Peter Coleman; Neil Giraldo

Pat Benatar singles chronology
"All Fired Up" (1988)	"Don't Walk Away" (1988)	"Let's Stay Together" (1988)

"Don't Walk Away" is a song by American singer Pat Benatar, released in 1988 as the second single from her eighth studio album, Wide Awake in Dreamland. The song was written by Nick Gilder and Duane Hitchings, and produced by Peter Coleman and Neil Giraldo.

== Background ==
It was Chrysalis' decision to release "Don't Walk Away" as a single from Wide Awake in Dreamland. Benatar told Todd Everett of the King Features Syndicate, "'Don't Walk Away' is so typical of what they'd choose to release."

== Music video ==
The song's music video was directed by Jim Yukich and produced by Paul Flattery. It achieved medium rotation on MTV.

== Critical reception ==
On its release as a single, Billboard described "Don't Walk Away" as "less aggressive" than the preceding single "All Fired Up", and added that "perhaps the nice mesh of Benatar's vocal and the power of this pretty pop track will produce a hit". Barry Young of The Press and Journal gave the single a two out of five star rating and wrote, "Benatar continues to produce ultra-American, drive-in teen rock with little relevance to this side of the Atlantic. Some nice touches here, but mainly typical Benatar."

== Track listing ==
7–inch and cassette single

1. "Don't Walk Away" – 4:10
2. "Lift 'em on Up" – 4:54

7–inch single (US promo)

1. "Don't Walk Away" – 4:10
2. "Don't Walk Away" – 4:10

12–inch and CD single (UK 12-inch and German 12-inch/CD release)

1. "Don't Walk Away" – 4:10
2. "Lift 'em on Up" – 4:54
3. "Hell Is For Children" (Live Version) – 6:14
4. "We Live for Love" (Special Mix) – 3:57

== Personnel ==
Don't Walk Away

- Pat Benatar – vocals
- Neil Giraldo – guitar
- Kevin Savigar – keyboards
- Fernando Saunders – bass
- Myron Grombacher – drums
- Frank Linx, Nick Gilder – backing vocals

Production

- Peter Coleman – producer and mixer on "Don't Walk Away" and "Lift 'em on Up"
- Neil Giraldo – producer and mixer (all tracks)
- Frank Linx, Steve Ford, Gil Morales – assistant engineers
- George Marino – mastering

== Charts ==
Chart (1988)	Peak position
Australia (ARIA)	61
Canada Top Singles (RPM)	63
New Zealand (Recorded Music NZ)	48
UK Singles (Official Charts)	42
US Mainstream Rock (Billboard)	44
