= The Possessed (2009 film) =

- DVD cover
- Directed by: Christopher Saint Booth; Philip Adrian Booth
- Written by: Christopher Saint Booth; Philip Adrian Booth
- Story by: Interview Material: Rosemary Ellen Guiley; Troy Taylor
- Based on: Journals: E. W. Stevens
- Produced by: Christopher Saint Booth
- Cinematography: Christopher Saint Booth
- Edited by: Christopher Saint Booth; Philip Adrian Booth
- Music by: Christopher Saint Booth
- Production companies: Spooked Productions; Twintalk Entertainment
- Distributed by: Spooked Television Releasing (DVD); Sci Fi Channel)
- Release date: May 2009
- Running time: 80 minutes
- Country: United States
- Language: English
- Budget: $1,500,000

The Possessed is a 2009 documentary style horror film written and directed by the Booth Brothers, which was released to DVD in May 2009 and had its television debut in October that same year on SyFy.

== Plot ==
The film is based upon the events surrounding what became known as the 'Watseka Wonder'. Using period photographs, dramatic recreations, and interviews with subject experts, it addresses what is allegedly the first well-documented and recorded spirit possession story in America of 1877, and the subsequent recorded "possessions" suffered by Lurancy.

Beginning in 2006, and using the assistance of members of the Studio Nine class of Watseka Community High School, The Possessed was shot on locations in Watseka, Illinois, in the actual homes of, and including interviews of, the remaining family members of Lurancy Vennum. The filmmakers included a repeat of an original 100-year-old séance, but were able to include modern measuring instruments. They also used footage of individuals themselves alleged to be possessed.

The film dramatically recreates the alleged events. After years of violent and self-destructive behavior, a young Mary Roff from Watseka, Illinois was committed to an asylum in Peoria, Illinois, and on July 5, 1865, she died. Twelve years later, a Watseka girl named Lurancy Vennum began exhibiting the same behavior as had Mary. When Asa Roff, a devout spiritist, heard of the incident, and believing that the spirit of his deceased daughter Mary has possessed Lurancy, he convinced the Vennum family to not commit their own daughter. Lurancy Vennum moved in with the Asa Roff family in 1878 and lived with them for several days. There she was examined by a spiritist, Dr. E. W. Stevens, who wrote about the case, and upon whose journals the film was based.

== Cast ==
=== Interviewees ===
- Christopher Saint Booth, filmmaker
- Philip Adrian Booth, filmmaker
- John Zaffis, demonologist
- Troy Taylor, ghost writer
- Keith Age, ghost hunter
- Rosemary Ellen Guiley Ph.D, paranormal author
- Bill Chappell, inventor
- Denice Jones, author, The Other Side
- Steven LaChance, author, The Uninvited
- James Long, bishop
- Rob Johnson, Manteno historian
- Dewi Morgaine, herself as possessed girl
- Scott Anderson, Vennum House owner
- Anita Tall Bull, herself
- Marcus Tall Bull, possessed
- John Whitman, Roff House owner
- Rick Hayes, himself
- Janet Pierce, grandmother
- Michael Jones, "The Sixth Sense" boy
- Kathy Reno, Glore Psychiatric Museum

=== Re-enactment actors ===
- Ava Belew as Lurancy Vennum
- Reenie Varga as Mrs. Roff
- Christina Molina as Mary Roff
- Matthew Udall as Dr. Stevens
- Gabriel Saint Booth as Young Michael

== Reception ==
Dread Central wrote that the writers covered the entire story of Mary Roff and Lurancy Vellum within their documentary, with their having traveled to Illinois to interview topic experts, historians, and surviving family members. The reviewer wrote "I was fascinated by the documentary" but stated that the latter day claimants to being possessed did not seem believable.
