= All Fired Up (Rattling Sabres song) =

1987 single by the Rattling Sabres

Single by Rattling Sabres
- B-side: "Nothin' Sacred"
- Released: 1987
- Studio: Powerplant (Melbourne, Australia)
- Length: 4:31
- Label: Mighty Boy
- Songwriter: Kerryn Tolhurst
- Producer: Kerryn Tolhurst

Music video
- "All Fired Up" on YouTube

"All Fired Up" is a song written by Kerryn Tolhurst and first performed and released by Australian country rock group Rattling Sabres in 1987. It charted nationally, peaking at number 94 on the Australian Music Report. The following year, American singer-songwriter Pat Benatar recorded a version that became a chart hit in several countries, including Australia, where it reached number two on the ARIA Singles Chart.

== Track listing ==
7-inch single

A. "All Fired Up"
B. "Nothin' Sacred"

== Charts ==
| Chart (1987) | Peak position |
|---|---|
| Australia (Australian Music Report) | 94 |

== Pat Benatar version ==
"All Fired Up"
- Limited-edition CD single

Single by Pat Benatar

from the album Wide Awake in Dreamland
- B-side: "Cool Zero"
- Released: 17 June 1988
- Studio: Ocean Way Recording (Los Angeles, California)
- Genre: Arena rock
- Length: 4:27 (album version); 4:08 (single edit)
- Label: Chrysalis
- Songwriter: Kerryn Tolhurst
- Producers: Keith Forsey; Neil Giraldo

Pat Benatar singles chronology
| "Big Life" (1986) | "All Fired Up" (1988) | "Don't Walk Away" (1988) |

Music video
- "All Fired Up" on YouTube

In 1988, Pat Benatar included a cover version on her seventh studio album, Wide Awake in Dreamland, and released it as the album's lead single in 1988. It reached number 19 on the US Billboard Hot 100—becoming Benatar's last US top 40 single as of 2026—and peaked at the same position on both the UK Singles Chart and the Canadian RPM 100 Singles chart. It also reached number 12 in South Africa and number two in Australia. The song is the title track on All Fired Up: The Very Best of Pat Benatar, a two-CD compilation released in 1994. In 1989, the song was nominated for Best Rock Vocal Performance, Female at the 31st Annual Grammy Awards.

=== Track listings ===
7-inch, cassette, and mini-CD single

1. "All Fired Up" (single version) – 4:08
2. "Cool Zero" – 5:26

12-inch and CD single

1. "All Fired Up" – 4:08
2. "Cool Zero" – 5:26
3. "All Fired Up" (US edit) – 3:55

=== Charts ===
==== Weekly charts ====
| Chart (1988) | Peak position |
|---|---|
| Australia (ARIA) | 2 |
| Canada Top Singles (RPM) | 19 |
| Europe (Eurochart Hot 100) | 63 |
| Ireland (IRMA) | 23 |
| Italy Airplay (Music & Media) | 12 |
| Luxembourg (Radio Luxembourg) | 18 |
| New Zealand (Recorded Music NZ) | 20 |
| South Africa (Springbok Radio) | 12 |
| UK Singles (Official Charts) | 19 |
| US Billboard Hot 100 | 19 |
| US Mainstream Rock (Billboard) | 2 |

==== Year-end charts ====
| Chart (1988) | Position |
|---|---|
| Australia (ARIA) | 16 |
