= Rattling Sabres =

1986–1987 Australian band

- Genres: Country rock
- Years active: 1986–1987
- Label: Mighty Boy
- Past members: Leyton Greening; Lindsay Hodgson; Robert Price; Kerryn Tolhurst; John Lee; Chong Lim; Bruce Nightingale; Ivan Kral; Tony Shanahan

Rattling Sabres were an Australian country rock group formed in 1986 by Leyton Greening on drums, Lindsay Hodgson on bass guitar, Robert Price on lead vocals and Kerryn Tolhurst on lead guitar (ex-the Dingoes). Greening was soon replaced on drums by John Lee (also ex-the Dingoes). They issued a single, "All Fired Up", in 1987 which had been written by Tolhurst. It peaked in the lower reaches of the Kent Music Report's top 100 singles chart.

== History ==
In 1986, Kerryn Tolhurst returned to Australia after working in the United States as a songwriter. He had been the lead guitarist of country rockers, Country Radio (1972–73), and the Dingoes, (1973–78). In 1986 Tolhurst formed another country rock group, Rattling Sabres, with Leyton Greening on drums, Lindsay Hodgson on bass guitar, Robert Price on lead vocals (ex-Riverina Playboys, Strange Idols Band, Renée Geyer Band). Later members included Chong Lim (ex-Gospel Jubilee, Yu-En) and Bruce Nightingale.

The short-lived group's major claim to fame was a single released in 1987, "All Fired Up", which charted nationally, peaking at No. 94 on the Australian Singles Chart. It had been written by Tolhurst and later rewritten and therefore credited to Pat Benatar and Myron Grombacher and Tolhurst. Benatar released her own version of "All Fired Up" as a single, a year later, which reached No. 2 in Australia, and was a top 20 hit in the United States, Canada, New Zealand and United Kingdom.

== Afterwards ==
Former members of Rattling Sabres worked as session and tour musician in various groups. Chong Lim joined John Farnham's backing band on keyboards from 1993. Tolhurst briefly worked in Black Sorrows (1994) and Goanna (1998) before forming Quill-Tolhurst with former bandmate Greg Quill on vocals, acoustic guitar and percussion (ex-Country Radio), which issued a studio album, So Rudely Interrupted, in 2003.

In December 2002 ScreenSound Australia and the National Screen and Sound Archive released an Australian various artists compilation album, All Fired Up – Lost Treasures of Australian Music, which was assembled by Paul Conn. According to music commentator, Duncan Kimball, it "presents an eclectic sampling of OzRock from the 70s to the 90s." The title track was described by Kimball, "[it] is best known from the version recorded by US singer Pat Benatar, which was a Top 20 hit for her in the US and Top 5 in Australia. The original version was written and produced by Rattling Sabres' founder, Kerryn Tolhurst."

Kerryn Tolhurst Band, with Robert Price aboard, issued an album, Out of the Shadows, in 2011. Robert Price is currently performing with his own band Flip Your Wig. They have released two singles on Belmar Records with an album due for release in late 2018.

== Members ==
- Robert Price: – lead vocals
- Kerryn Tolhurst: – lead guitar
- Leyton Greening - drums
- Lindsay Hodgson - bass guitar
- John Lee - drums
- Chong Lim - keyboards
- Bruce Nightingale
- Ivan Král
- Tony Shanahan

== Discography ==
=== Singles ===
List of singles, with selected chart positions
| Year | Title | Peak chart positions |
| Year | Title | AUS |
|---|---|---|
| 1987 | "All Fired Up" | 94 |
