= List of Billboard Hot 100 number ones of 1978 =

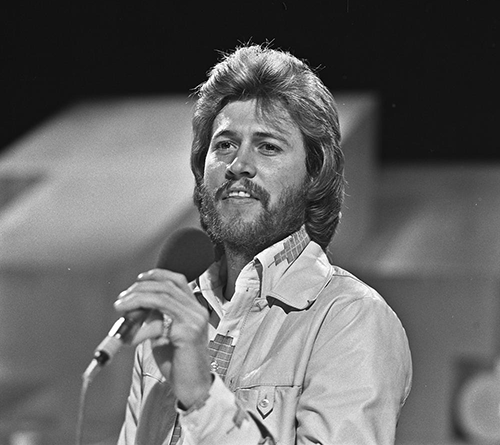
Barry Gibb wrote or co-wrote seven of 1978's number ones: three for his own group, the Bee Gees, two for his brother Andy Gibb, and one each for Yvonne Elliman and Frankie Valli.

The Billboard Hot 100 is a chart published since August 1958 by Billboard magazine which ranks the best-performing singles in the United States. In 1978, it was compiled based on a combination of sales and airplay data sourced from surveys of retail outlets and playlists submitted by radio stations, respectively. During the year, 20 different singles spent time at number one.

In the issue of Billboard dated January 7, the number-one single was "How Deep Is Your Love" by the Bee Gees, the song's third week in the top spot. A week later, it was displaced by "Baby Come Back" by Player, but in the issue dated February 4, the Bee Gees returned to the top spot with "Stayin' Alive", which held the number-one position for four weeks. It was the first of four consecutive chart-toppers to be written, either wholly or in collaboration, by Barry Gibb, a member of the Bee Gees alongside his brothers Robin and Maurice. "Stayin' Alive" was displaced from the top spot by "(Love Is) Thicker Than Water" by Andy Gibb, the youngest of the brothers but never a member of the Bee Gees. His older siblings returned to number one in the issue of Billboard dated March 18 with "Night Fever", which topped the chart for eight consecutive weeks, the year's longest run atop the Hot 100. It meant that the four Gibb brothers had between them topped the chart for 14 consecutive weeks. "If I Can't Have You" by Yvonne Elliman was the fourth consecutive chart-topper (and the fifth of the year to date) to include Barry Gibb among its writers when it spent a single week at number one in the issue dated May 13; Gibb thus broke a record held by John Lennon and Paul McCartney of the Beatles, who had written three consecutive number ones in 1964. "How Deep Is Your Love", "Stayin' Alive", "Night Fever", and "If I Can't Have You" were all taken from the soundtrack of the film Saturday Night Fever.

The chart dominance of the Gibb brothers continued in June and July, when Andy spent seven weeks at number one with "Shadow Dancing". He and his older brothers, who co-wrote "Shadow Dancing" with him, were the only two acts with multiple chart-toppers during the year. The Bee Gees had the highest total number of weeks in the top spot in 1978 with 13, and Andy Gibb had the second-highest total with 9. "Grease" by Frankie Valli was the seventh Barry Gibb-penned number one of 1978 when it topped the chart for two weeks in August and September. Valli's song was the second number one from the soundtrack of the film Grease following "You're the One That I Want" by its stars John Travolta and Olivia Newton-John. During the year, 12 acts reached number one on the Hot 100 for the first time. Player, Elliman, Travolta, Deniece Williams, Commodores, A Taste of Honey, Exile, Nick Gilder, Anne Murray, Donna Summer, and Chic all gained the first pop number ones of their careers. Johnny Mathis's collaboration with Williams on "Too Much, Too Little, Too Late" gave him his first number one since Billboard combined their previously separate sales and airplay charts to create the Hot 100 in 1958; his last pop chart-topper had been on the Most Played by Jockeys listing in 1957.

== Chart history ==
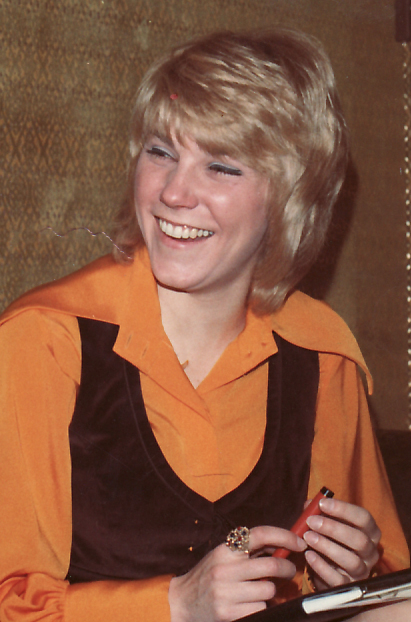
"You Needed Me" was a chart-topper for Anne Murray.

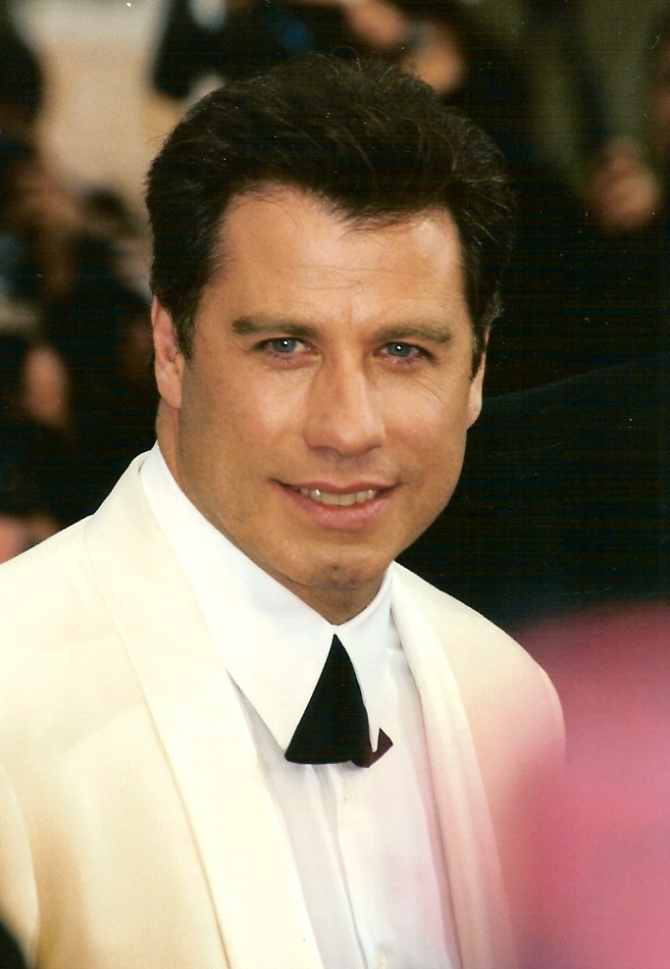
John Travolta (pictured in 1997) had his first number one when he duetted with Olivia Newton-John on "You're the One That I Want".

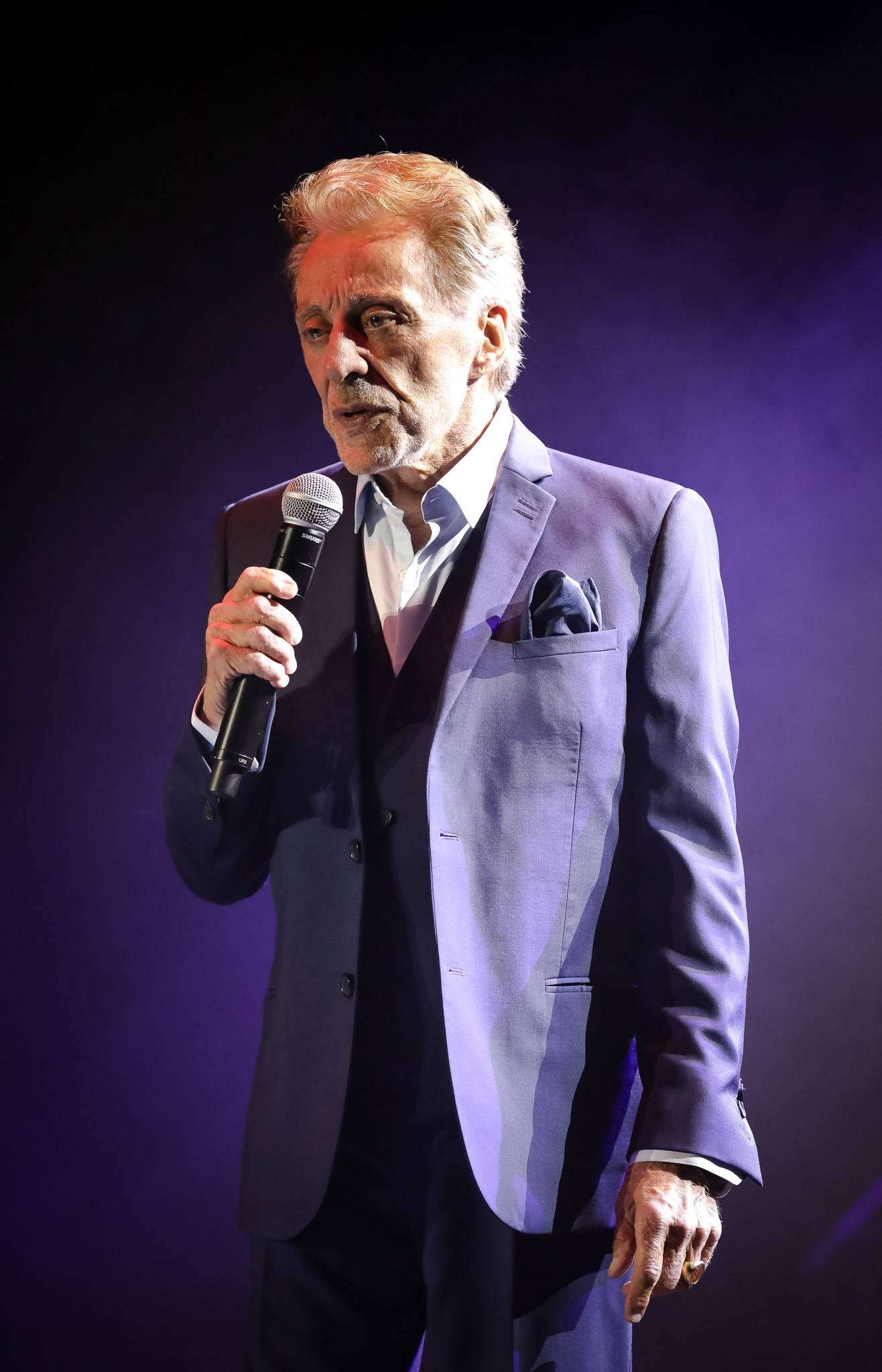
Frankie Valli (pictured in 2022) topped the Hot 100 with the title song from the film Grease.

Chart history
No. (Note: The "No." column indicates the numerical sequence of number ones in Hot 100 history. "Re" indicates a single returning to number one.)	Issue date	Title	Artist(s)	Ref.
437	January 7	"How Deep Is Your Love"	Bee Gees	
438	January 14	"Baby Come Back"	Player	
438	January 21	"Baby Come Back"	Player	
438	January 28	"Baby Come Back"	Player	
439	February 4	"Stayin' Alive"	Bee Gees	
439	February 11	"Stayin' Alive"	Bee Gees	
439	February 18	"Stayin' Alive"	Bee Gees	
439	February 25	"Stayin' Alive"	Bee Gees	
440	March 4	"(Love Is) Thicker Than Water"	Andy Gibb	
440	March 11	"(Love Is) Thicker Than Water"	Andy Gibb	
441	March 18	"Night Fever"	Bee Gees	
441	March 25	"Night Fever"	Bee Gees	
441	April 1	"Night Fever"	Bee Gees	
441	April 8	"Night Fever"	Bee Gees	
441	April 15	"Night Fever"	Bee Gees	
441	April 22	"Night Fever"	Bee Gees	
441	April 29	"Night Fever"	Bee Gees	
441	May 6	"Night Fever"	Bee Gees	
442	May 13	"If I Can't Have You"	Yvonne Elliman	
443	May 20	"With a Little Luck"	Wings	
443	May 27	"With a Little Luck"	Wings	
444	June 3	"Too Much, Too Little, Too Late"	Johnny Mathis and Deniece Williams	
445	June 10	"You're the One That I Want"	John Travolta and Olivia Newton-John	
446	June 17	"Shadow Dancing"	Andy Gibb	
446	June 24	"Shadow Dancing"	Andy Gibb	
446	July 1	"Shadow Dancing"	Andy Gibb	
446	July 8	"Shadow Dancing"	Andy Gibb	
446	July 15	"Shadow Dancing"	Andy Gibb	
446	July 22	"Shadow Dancing"	Andy Gibb	
446	July 29	"Shadow Dancing"	Andy Gibb	
447	August 5	"Miss You"	The Rolling Stones	
448	August 12	"Three Times a Lady"	Commodores	
448	August 19	"Three Times a Lady"	Commodores	
449	August 26	"Grease"	Frankie Valli	
449	September 2	"Grease"	Frankie Valli	
450	September 9	"Boogie Oogie Oogie"	A Taste of Honey	
450	September 16	"Boogie Oogie Oogie"	A Taste of Honey	
450	September 23	"Boogie Oogie Oogie"	A Taste of Honey	
451	September 30	"Kiss You All Over"	Exile	
451	October 7	"Kiss You All Over"	Exile	
451	October 14	"Kiss You All Over"	Exile	
451	October 21	"Kiss You All Over"	Exile	
452	October 28	"Hot Child in the City"	Nick Gilder	
453	November 4	"You Needed Me"	Anne Murray	
454	November 11	"MacArthur Park"	Donna Summer	
454	November 18	"MacArthur Park"	Donna Summer	
454	November 25	"MacArthur Park"	Donna Summer	
455	December 2	"You Don't Bring Me Flowers"	Barbra and Neil (Note: Barbra Streisand and Neil Diamond were credited only by their forenames on this single.)	
456	December 9	"Le Freak"	Chic	
455 (re)	December 16	"You Don't Bring Me Flowers"	Barbra and Neil	
456 (re)	December 23	"Le Freak"	Chic	
456 (re)	December 30 (Note: This was an unpublished week, due to a special double issue that Billboard published in print the previous week. All positions on the Hot 100 were "frozen" during the break.)	"Le Freak"	Chic	

== Number-one artists ==
List of number-one artists by total weeks at number one
Weeks at No. 1	Artist
13	Bee Gees
9	Andy Gibb
4	Exile
3	Player
3	A Taste of Honey
3	Donna Summer
3	Chic
2	Wings
2	Commodores
2	Frankie Valli
2	Barbra Streisand
2	Neil Diamond
1	Yvonne Elliman
1	Johnny Mathis
1	Deniece Williams
1	John Travolta
1	Olivia Newton-John
1	The Rolling Stones
1	Nick Gilder
1	Anne Murray

== See also ==
- 1978 in music
- List of Cash Box Top 100 number-one singles of 1978
- List of Billboard Hot 100 number-one singles of the 1970s
