= Roxy Roller =

1975 song by Sweeney Todd

Single by Sweeney Todd

from the album Sweeney Todd
- B-side: "Rue de Chance"
- Released: April 1976 (Canada); June 1976 (U.S.)
- Recorded: 1975, 1976
- Genre: Glam rock
- Length: 2:46
- Label: London
- Songwriters: Jim McCulloch, Nick Gilder
- Producer: Martin Shaer

Sweeney Todd singles chronology
"Sweeney Todd Folder" (1976)	"Roxy Roller" (1976)	"Say Hello, Say Goodbye" (1976)

"Roxy Roller" is a song originally recorded by the glam rock band Sweeney Todd in 1975 with Nick Gilder on vocals. It was written by Jim McCulloch and Nick Gilder. In total, four versions of the song were released in 1976:

- the original one at London Records, cat. no. L 2590, released in Canada only,
- a solo version recorded by Nick Gilder released at Chrysalis Records in various countries outside Canada in 1976,
- a version by Sweeney Todd with newly recorded vocals by new lead singer Clark Perry on London Records, cat. no. 5N-240, released in various countries outside Canada.
- a version by Sweeney Todd with newly recorded vocals by new lead singer Bryan Adams on London Records, cat. no. 5N-244, released in the U.S. only.

== Canadian success story ==
The original version did chart big in Canada, entering during May 1976: the song spent three consecutive weeks at number one in Canada during June and July 1976. By that time Gilder and McCulloch both had already left the band to pursue a solo career.

"Roxy Roller" ranks as the fifth biggest Canadian hit of 1976 and won a Juno Award for the band.

== US reception ==
Because the song was not an immediate success with the American public, Gilder took a chance and recorded a solo version. It was released on Chrysalis Records. However, it faced immediate competition from Sweeney Todd's rush-released re-recorded version on which new singer Clark Perry did lead vocals. Acting on Gilder's behalf, Chrysalis Records demanded that imported copies of the Sweeney Todd original, as well as of the newly recorded version, be withdrawn from the US market. Record stores duly removed both versions from their shelves.

However, two re-recorded versions of 'Roxy Roller' did chart on the Billboard Hot 100. The version with vocals by Clark Perry peaked at #90 (and at #97 in the Cash Box Top 100) in late August 1976. A second Sweeney Todd re-recording--with vocals by Bryan Adams--peaked at #99 in mid-September 1976.

With four versions of "Roxy Roller" competing for stateside attention, none achieved either a high chart position or great sales, despite the glam rock sound still being popular at the time.

== Chart history ==
=== Weekly charts ===
Nick Gilder original

Chart (1976)	Peak position
Canada RPM Top Singles (as Sweeney Todd)(3wks@#1)	1

Chart (1977)	Peak position
Australia (Kent Music Report)	29

Clark Perry re-record

Chart (1976)	Peak position
U.S. Billboard Hot 100	90
U.S. Cash Box Top 100	93

Bryan Adams re-record

Chart (1976)	Peak position
U.S. Billboard Hot 100	99

=== Year-end charts ===
Gilder

Chart (1976)	Rank
Canada	5

Perry

Chart (1976)	Rank
US (Joel Whitburn's Pop Annual)	466

Adams

Chart (1976)	Rank
US (Joel Whitburn's Pop Annual)	525

== Cover versions ==
- "Roxy Roller" was covered by Suzi Quatro in 1977.
- The song was covered by Jaded Past in 2014.
- The song was covered by former Runaways singer Cherie Currie on her Blvds of Splendor album in 2019.
- Canadian surf rock group The Surfrajettes performed an instrumental cover of the song on their 2022 album Roller Fink.
