= Kerryn Tolhurst =

Australian musician (born 1948)

- Born: Kerryn William Tolhurst; 7 May 1948 (age 78); Williamstown, Victoria, Australia
- Genres: Country rock
- Occupations: Musician, songwriter, record producer
- Instruments: Guitar; mandolin; lap steel guitar; banjo; tiple
- Years active: 1963–present
- Website: kerryntolhurst.com.au

Kerryn William Tolhurst (born 7 May 1948) is an Australian country rock musician, songwriter and producer. He was based in the United States from late 1970s to the late 1990s, although he periodically returned to Australia. He was a founder of the Australian group, the Dingoes (1973–1979, 2009–present) and co-wrote their top 40 hit single, "Way Out West" (October 1973). It was covered by fellow Australians, James Blundell and James Reyne in 1991, which reached No. 2 on the ARIA Singles Chart. He also formed a short-lived group, Rattling Sabres, and wrote their single, "All Fired Up" (1987). The track was reworked by Pat Benatar (and Myron Grombacher) and released as her single in June 1988, which peaked at No. 2 in Australia and reached the top 20 in the United Kingdom, Canada, New Zealand and the U.S.

== Biography ==
Kerryn William Tolhurst was born on 7 May 1948 in Williamstown, Victoria to Aileen (née Costello) and Eric Tolhurst. His early groups included Blues Merchants, and Vacant Lot. In 1964, on guitar and mandolin, he formed the Adderley Smith Blues Band, in Melbourne, with his friend Mark Dindas on piano. They performed at local dances and clubs with a variable line-up. Other members included Broderick Smith on vocals and harmonica who joined in 1966 and was replaced in 1968 by Joe Camilleri on vocals and saxophone. Both Tolhurst and Smith were conscripted for National Service during the Vietnam War. Tolhurst was stationed in Melbourne and was able to keep a version of Adderley Smith Blues Band going until 1970. Australian musicologist, Ian McFarlane, observed that they were, "one of the first authentic blues bands Australia ever produced."

In 1970 Tolhurst on guitar formed a country rock group, Sundown, with Mark Barnes on bass guitar (ex-Moppa Blues, Delta Set, Roadrunners, Cam-Pact), Keith Glass on vocals and guitar (ex-Rising Sons, Eighteenth Century Quartet, Cam-Pact), and Barry Windley on drums (ex-the Chessmen, the Cherokees, Quinn). Smith briefly joined before going on to Carson in 1971. Sundown issued a lone single, "This Country of Mine" (June 1972), but Tolhurst had already left before it appeared. Tolhurst, on guitar, lap steel guitar and mandolin joined Country Radio in late January 1972. Alongside him were John A Bird on keyboards, Chris Blanchflower on harmonica, Tony Bolton on drums (ex-The Affair, Freshwater), John Du Bois on bass guitar (ex-Circle of Love, New Dream), and founding mainstay, Greg Quill on vocals and guitar. Tolhurst and Quill formed a songwriting partnership and penned the group's second single, "Gypsy Queen" (August 1972). It became the group's highest charting single, peaking at No. 12 on the Go-Set National Top 40, and remained on the chart for 13 weeks.

Tolhurst left Country Radio in February 1973 and briefly joined Mississippi, which later became Little River Band. He then teamed up with Smith again in April of that year to form another country rock band, the Dingoes. The other founding members were John Lee on drums (ex-Sayla, Blackfeather), Chris Stockley on guitar (ex-Cam-Pact, Axiom), and John Strangio on bass guitar (ex-St James Infirmary, Middle Earth). Their debut single, "Way Out West" (October 1973), co-written by Tolhurst, peaked in the top 40. In March 1992 it was covered by fellow Australians, James Blundell and James Reyne, which reached No. 2 on the ARIA Singles Chart. Tolhurst appears on all of the Dingoes' albums, including their three studio albums, The Dingoes (1974), Five Times the Sun (1977), and Orphans of the Storm (1979). They had relocated to North America in mid-1976, where they recorded the latter two albums and toured the United States. Shortly after the third album appeared the group disbanded.

Following the Dingoes break up, he remained in the US and moved to New York where he worked as a songwriter. In 1986 he briefly returned to Australia and formed several bands including the Tremors, and the Rattling Sabres. The latter had former bandmate Lee on drums with Lindsay Hodgson on bass guitar and Robert Price on vocals. They had a minor hit with "All Fired Up" (August 1987), which was written by Tolhurst. The band relocated to the US but broke up shortly after. "All Fired Up" was reworked by Pat Benatar and her drummer, Myron Grombacher, and then released as her single in June 1988, which peaked at No. 2 in Australia and reached the top 20 in the United Kingdom, Canada and New Zealand.

Tolhurst periodically returned to Australia where he worked as a session musician and record producer. In both roles he worked on the Black Sorrows' studio album, Lucky Charm (November 1994), which he co-produced with the band's Joe Camilleri (former Adderley Smith Blues Band bandmate). He also provided guitar, banjo, tiple, mandolin, lap steel guitar and Hawaiian guitar. He next worked on Paul Kelly's Deeper Water (September 1995) on the tracks, "Difficult Woman" and "Give in to My Love". He returned to Australia to co-produce the Black Sorrow's next studio album, Beat Club (November 1998). He also produced Goanna's album Spirit Returns, which was released in the same month. While still in Australia early in the following year, Tolhurst met with Country Radio's Greg Quill. Quill was also visiting Australia and was based in Toronto as an entertainment journalist for Toronto Star. They decided to form a duo, Quill & Tolhurst, to co-write and perform new material, after they each returned to their homes in North America. It resulted in an album, So Rudely Interrupted (May 2003), which Australian music journalist Ed Nimmervoll felt showed, "Kerryn sensitively weaves his multi-instrumental magic around [Quill's] vocals, one of the most tasteful and talented musicians Australia has ever produced."

In 2005, he produced and played on the John Schumann and the Vagabond Crew album Lawson. In 2012, he released a solo album called Out of the Shadows again featuring Robert Price on vocals.
