= Sweeney Todd (band) =

Canadian rock band

- Origin: Vancouver, British Columbia, Canada
- Genres: Hard rock, glam rock
- Years active: 1975–1978; 2000–present
- Label: London
- Members: Nick Gilder; Mike Russell; Joe Wowk; Lance Chalmers; Timothy B Hewitt
- Past members: Clark Perry; Bryan Adams; Drummond Eveleigh-Smith; Christopher Booth; Skip Prest; Grant Gislason; Philip Booth; John Booth; Glenn Regnier; Mark Kenny; Dave Groves; Jim McCulloch; Marc Gladstone; Dan Gaudin; Budd Marr; Don Snell; Frank Baker
- Website: nickgilder.com

Sweeney Todd is a Canadian glam rock band formed in Vancouver in 1975. They released two albums, the first with original lead vocalist Nick Gilder, who soon left for a solo career, and the second with his 16-year-old replacement Bryan Adams, who later enjoyed international success as a solo artist.

== Overview ==
The band, formed in Vancouver, British Columbia, originally consisted of vocalist Nick Gilder, guitarist Jim McCulloch, bassist Budd Marr, keyboardist Dan Gaudin and drummer John Booth. The single "Roxy Roller" became a No. 1 hit in Canada, holding the top position in the RPM national singles chart for three weeks beginning on June 26, 1976, and winning a Juno Award for the band.

Gilder and McCulloch left the band to pursue solo careers. Gilder had hits with "Hot Child in the City", "Here Comes the Night" and "(You Really) Rock Me".

Clark Perry was brought in to replace Gilder on vocals, and Skip Prest replaced McCulloch on guitar. There was suggestion at this time that the group might rerecord their debut album in its entirety for the US market. Though he did record a second version of "Roxy Roller", Perry did not work out, however, and was replaced within a few months by Bryan Adams, who was 16 at that time. That incarnation of Sweeney Todd also recorded a third version of "Roxy Roller".

The new lineup recorded Sweeney Todd's second album, If Wishes Were Horses. That album was unsuccessful and Adams left the band after less than a year. He left the band to embark on a solo career with Jim Vallance; his most successful album to date is Reckless, which sold 12 million copies.

John Booth’s younger brother, Christopher Saint Booth, replaced Bryan Adams in 1978, serving as the band’s vocalist for a time. However, this lineup did not last long. Christopher left to join the band "Rodan" in Des Moines, Iowa and was replaced by his twin brother, Philip Booth. Philip joined as the band’s guitarist and was nicknamed "The Kid" by the other members, as he was the youngest in the group. Upon Philip’s arrival, the band was renamed simply "Sweeney." They recorded an album about the story of "Sweeney Todd the Demon Barber of Fleet St.", which 7 songs were recorded in Victoria at Keye Studios. London Records wasn't interested on the album at this time as Disco was the In thing on the radio. So they went back into the studio in Vancouver and received the "demo mix" of a few songs that they were working on, 5 original songs along with a version of " Goldfinger". This was just a rough mix to take home. Nothing was ever released. Some time later, Christopher returned, and in 1979, he and Philip transformed the group into AlleyBrat. They toured across Canada and Alaska, a run that concluded in early 1980, after which the twins moved to Washington to continue the band.

The band re-united with Gilder in 2000 and began working on The Sweeney Todd LP. The band followed up the completion of the record with a cross-Canada tour.

In 2007, Sweeney Todd — along with Gilder — headlined the Golden Spike Days Festival in Port Moody, British Columbia. In 2008, they performed (again with Gilder) at the Merritt Mountain Musicfest in Merritt, British Columbia.

== Discography ==
Albums

- Sweeney Todd (1975) (Canadian RPM Album chart: #3)
- If Wishes Were Horses (1977) (Canadian RPM Album chart: #78)

Singles

- "Sweeney Todd Folder" (1976) - Canada #36
- "Roxy Roller" (1976) - Canada #1, U.S. #90
- "Say Hello, Say Goodbye" (1976) - Canada #75
- "If Wishes Were Horses" (1977) - Canada #59
