= Christopher and Philip Booth =

British-Canadian twin musicians (born 1960)

- Born: Christopher Saint Booth; Philip Adrian Booth; 19 February 1960 (age 66); Halifax, West Riding of Yorkshire, England
- Died: Philip Adrian Booth; 11 June 2026 (aged 66)
- Other name: Collectively: The Booth Brothers
- Occupations: Filmmakers; writers; directors; cinematographers; composers; musicians
- Years active: 1973-2026
- Notable work: "Ulterior Motives"
- Musical career
- Labels: Spooked Music Releasing; NWS Music Group; Bratman Records; Motion Records
- Formerly of: Toys; Rags; Rodan (Christopher Booth); Sweeney Todd; AlleyBrat; Affair; T42; Who's Who?; Cowboys & Angels; Fallen Angel; Day Job
- Website: spookedtv.com

Christopher Saint Booth (Note: Sometimes incorrectly referred to as Christopher David Booth) (born 19 February 1960) and Philip Adrian Booth (19 February 1960 – 11 June 2026) were a pair of British-Canadian twin brother musicians and filmmakers best known for the 1985 song "Ulterior Motives". The song became known in the lostwave community, a social media subculture based around obscure songs, as "Everyone Knows That" (EKT); its authorship and title were not known to the online community. The community originally only had a 17-second clip of the song, which was originally posted by user carl92 on the French song identification website WatZatSong. The song was the subject of a search from 2021 to 2024 for the identification of its title and original artist, which was then found in the 1986 pornographic film Angels of Passion. As filmmakers, the brothers have made several documentaries on ghosts, haunted locations, and exorcisms. Together they directed several horror movies in the 2000s, with some notable actors, such as Matthew McGrory.

== Biography and career ==
Born on 19 February 1960, the Booth brothers were originally from Halifax, West Yorkshire, England, before moving to Canada in the 1970s. Chris and Phil briefly had their own band, Toys, from 1976 to 1977.

In late 1977, Christopher Booth replaced Bryan Adams as a vocalist of the band Sweeney Todd, in which his older brother John was the drummer and his twin Philip played guitar. They performed several live shows, but he left the band in early 1978 before releasing any music, due to him leaving Canada and joining the band Rodan in Iowa.

After the fracturing of Sweeney Todd, Chris returned to Vancouver with him, Phil and their older brother John Booth starting a band called Rags alongside bassist Bill in early 1979, before disbanding that same year.

With Rags ending, Chris and Phil decided to start the band AlleyBrat, alongside Barry Muir on bass, Randy Parr on keyboards and Bud Omstead on drums. In 1980, Chris and Phil moved to Seattle and reformed AlleyBrat with bassist Brian East and drummer Steve Carlson. This era of AlleyBrat brought a more glam metal and “future punk” sound to their music, and was also the first time the band released any music, with their single "It's the Wave / My Description of You" being released in 1980, and their second single "Singing in the Rain / We Are the Future" being released in January 1981, then disbanding in 1982. The band also recorded songs like "Memory Banks", "To Sir With Love", "Love In Space" and "Modern Hero" (aka "Modern Heroe"), but would go unreleased till the Lost Album album series released by the brothers in the 2020s.

After AlleyBrat ended, Chris and Phil moved to California and started the band Affair in 1982, transitioning from hard rock to synth-pop music. Alongside the Booths the band had Brian West on bass and synths, and Jeffery Swisstack on drums. Affair made their way in to the live music scene after making their debut performing at The Troubadour in West Hollywood on July 3, 1983. While performing their music, the band struggled to get a record deal, the band used a connection to the film industry via a crew member, eventually leading to the band performing their songs "Animal In Me" and "Till the End of Time" in the 1984 adult movie Taboo III. During this time the band recorded songs like "Do You I Do", "Love Is All I Got For You" and "If I Only", only officially released in Lost Album series.

After Affair ended, Chris and Phil started the synth-pop band T42, mostly recording songs at home studios, usually in the house of Philip Booth’s first wife. In T42, Christopher often handled drum programming, synths and vocals, while Philip provided guitar and backing vocals. Bassist Ira Ward often collaborated with the brothers to create songs like "Mayday In Heaven" and "For All We Know". In 1985, the Booth brothers secured a production deal with producer Gary Goetzman, though this production deal eventually fell through after an album preparing to be released under Capitol Records was shelved. Continuing the adult film work, the brothers continued to license their music, most notably the 1986 adult film Angels of Passion. Along with featuring many of their compositions such as "Ulterior Motives", "Chemistry", "China Girl" and an instrumental version of "Mayday In Heaven", the film had Chris doing a cameo as a bomber. While licensing songs to pornographic films, the brothers also took miscellaneous crew jobs such as production assistants for some of those same projects. This included two years working for Playboy, as well as jobs in Hollywood productions such as Dreamscape.

In 1986, the Booth Brothers would rework their band as Who’s Who?, to appeal to the name trends of the late 1980s. In 1991, Who’s Who? temporarily went under a new alias called Saint and the Soldiers of Misfortune (aka Saint) as part of the Rock Against War movement, recording songs "War" and "Crush On You". After disbanding Who’s Who? in 1992, the Booth brothers reunited with their brother John and started the new-age band Cowboys & Angels, which also featured Chaz on bass and Reenie Varga on backing vocals. The band recorded songs such as "Like Father, Like Son" and "Follow Through". In 1995, the band renamed to Fallen Angel to appeal to the mid 1990s alternative scene.

When Cowboys & Angels/Fallen Angel ended, the brothers decided to branch into filmmaking, focusing on paranormal and horror related content. Using their experience and their life savings, they made Dark Place. SyFy both picked up their movies and requested them to make documentaries, with one of them, Spooked inspiring them to name their company Spooked Productions.

Christopher's first book, titled Paranoia, was released in 2015. It is a memoir of his experiences with the paranormal, for which he also made an audiobook version.

On April 28, 2024, a snippet of a lost song (aka lostwave) uploaded to website WatZatSong was identified, and traced back to the Booth brothers, after being found in the 1986 adult film, Angels of Passion. The song was confirmed to be "Ulterior Motives" by T42, recorded in 1985.

On June 11, 2026, Christopher announced on Instagram that Philip had passed away, the post reading:

It is with profound sadness and a heavy heart that we announce the passing of our beloved Father, Brother, Uncle, Partner and True Artist, Philip Adrian Booth.

During this incredibly difficult time, the Booth family respectfully requests privacy as we grieve and process this monumental loss.

It was Philip's explicit wish that those who knew and loved him celebrate his life by spreading love and kindness. His family, friends, and the global community of fans meant the world to him, and his final days were filled with immense joy and gratitude for how deeply his music and films touched lives across the world.

Philip was an extraordinary talent, a visionary creator, and a beautiful soul. In honor of his legacy, in respect for his artistry, and as a true memorial to his life's work, we are fully committed to carrying forward the projects and songs that he championed.

Our primary focus is to heal and finalize the highly anticipated Ulterior Motives documentary-film that Philip poured his heart into for our fans. He was so excited for you all to see it.

To my brother: I got you, always.

We extend our deepest gratitude to everyone for your continuous love, support, respect and understanding.

Keep Shining Bright, The Booth Family

The brothers released their last ever film together in September 2026, called Ulterior Motives: The Search Is Over, The Story Begins!, which documents the brothers' lives and their journey in music.

== Filmography ==
Films with contributions from Christopher Saint Booth
Year	Film	Role	Notes	Ref.
1984	Taboo III	Band Performer	He performed his songs "Till the End of Time" and "Animal in Me" in the movie	
1986	Angels of Passion	Bomber	Additional credit as composer and production assistant	
1986	Dirty Dreams	Spy No. 3 & Man in glasses	Additional credit as production assistant	
1988	Droid	Robot Rawchester	Additionally credited as a writer, producer, and composer in the movie	
2005	Death Tunnel	—N/a	Composer, producer, writer	
2005	ShadowBox	—N/a	Composer, producer, writer	
2006	Spooked: The Ghosts of Waverly Hills Sanatorium	Himself	Additional credits as composer, director, editor, writer	
2007	DarkPlace	—N/a	Composer, producer, writer	
2007	Children of the Grave	Himself	Additional credits as composer, director, editor, producer, writer	
2008	Ghouls Gone Wild	—N/a	Composer, editor, producer, writer	
2009	The Possessed	Himself	Additional credits as cinematographer, composer, director, editor, producer, writer	
2010	The Haunted Boy: The Secret Diary of the Exorcist	Himself	Additional credits as composer, director, editor, producer, writer	
2011	Immortal Island	—N/a	Composer	
2011	Soul Catcher	Himself	Additional credits as cinematographer, composer, director, editor, producer, writer	
2012	Children of the Grave 2	Himself	Additional credits as composer, director, editor, producer, writer	
2014	The Exorcist File	Himself	Additional credits as composer, director, editor, producer, writer	
2014	Dead Still	—N/a	Composer, producer	
2023	The Attached	Himself	Additional credits as cinematographer, composer, director, editor, producer, writer	
2026	Ulterior Motives: The Search Is Over, The Story Begins!	Himself	—N/a	

Films with contributions from Philip Adrian Booth
Year	Film	Role	Ref
1986	Angels of Passion	Production assistant and composer	
1988	Droid	Director	
2005	Death Tunnel	Cinematographer, director, editor, writer	
2005	ShadowBox		
2006	Spooked: The Ghosts of Waverly Hills Sanatorium		
2007	Children of the Grave		
2007	Dark Place		
2008	Ghouls Gone Wild		
2009	The Possessed		
2009	Immortal Island		
2010	The Haunted Boy: Secret Diary of the Exorcist		
2014	Dead Still	Director, screenplay writer	
2023	The Attached	Director, writer	

== Discography ==
=== As Who's Who? and Christopher Saint ===
==== Studio albums ====
- Droid (Original Soundtrack) (Released in 1988 as Cinema Symphonys)
- Ulterior Motives (The Lost Album) (recorded 1980s and 2024, remastered) (2024)
- Animal in Me (The Lost Album Vol. 2) (recorded 1980s and 2024, remastered) (2024)
- The Lost '80s Soundtracks (recorded 1980s – 1990s, remastered) (2025)
- Modern Heroes (The Lost Album Vol. 3) (recorded 1970s – 1990s, remastered) (2025)
- Jump, Scream 'n' Shout (released digitally as EP; CD includes The Lost Album Vol. 4) (recorded 2025 and 1980s – 1990s, remastered) (2025)
- Curious Hearts (The Lost Album Vol. 4) (digital release) (recorded 2025 and 1980s – 1990s, remastered) (2026)
- The Lost '90s Soundtracks, Vol. 2 (recorded 1990s, remastered) (2026)

==== Soundtrack albums ====
- Ulterior Motives: The Search is Over, the Story Begins (recorded 1970s-1990s and 2024, remastered) (2026)

==== Singles ====
- "It's The Wave / My Description Of You" (Released in 1980 as AlleyBrat)
- "Singing In The Rain / We Are The Future" (Released in 1981 as AlleyBrat)
- "Chemistry" (recorded 1986, remastered) (2024)
- "Ulterior Motives (Fan Tribute Remix)" (recorded 1985 and 2024, remastered) (2024)
- "Just My Imagination" (recorded 1986, remastered) (2024)
- "Love Letters" (recorded 1986, remastered) (2024)
- "Vampyre Bat" (recorded 1994, remastered) (2025)
- "Live and Let Love (Lost Basement Tapes)" (recorded 1984, remastered) (2025)
- "Like Father, Like Son" (recorded February 1993, remastered) (2025)
- "WAR" (recorded 1991, remastered) (2026)
- "Ulterior Motives (1985 AOP Mix)" (recorded 1985, remastered) (2026)

=== As Christopher Saint ===
==== Studio albums ====
- Elysium (2020)
- SkyPolar (2024)

==== Soundtrack albums ====
- Spooked: The Ghosts of Waverly Hills Sanatorium (2006)
- Children of the Grave (2010)
- The Possessed (2010)
- DarkPlace (2010)
- The Haunted Boy: The Secret Diary of the Exorcist (2010)
- Soul Catcher (2011)
- Children of the Grave 2 (2012)
- Dead Still (2016)
- The Attached (with Philip Adrian Booth) (2021)
- Never Blink (2025)

=== As Christopher Saint Booth ===
- Paranoia Audio Experience (2016)
