= Hot Child in the City =

Single by Nick Gilder

from the album City Nights
- B-side: "Backstreet Noise"
- Released: June 12, 1978
- Recorded: October 1977
- Genre: Rock; power pop
- Length: 3:09 (single version); 3:35 (album version)
- Label: Chrysalis
- Songwriters: Nick Gilder, James McCulloch
- Producer: Mike Chapman

Nick Gilder singles chronology
"Here Comes the Night" (1978)	"Hot Child in the City" (1978)	"She's One of the Boys" (1979)

"Hot Child in the City" is a song by English-Canadian musician Nick Gilder. It was released in June 1978 as a single from the album City Nights. It went to No. 1 both in Canada (October 14, 1978) and in the United States (October 28, 1978). It was not his first No. 1 single: as the lead singer of Sweeney Todd, he had hit No. 1 in Canada on June 26, 1976 (in the RPM listing) with the single "Roxy Roller", which remained at the top for three weeks. He won 2 Juno Awards in Canada and a People's Choice Award in the US. According to The Billboard Book of Number 1 Hits, it held the record for taking the longest amount of weeks to reach No. 1 at the time, taking 21 weeks to reach the summit. The song became a platinum record.

== Content ==
The tune is based on Gilder's experiences witnessing child prostitution in Los Angeles. "I've seen a lot of young girls, 15 and 16, walking down Hollywood Boulevard with their pimps. Their home environment drove them to distraction so they ran away, only to be trapped by something even worse. It hurts to see that so I tried writing from the perspective of a lecher – in the guise of an innocent pop song."

Speaking with the Canadian Songwriters Hall of Fame, Gilder backed away from the prostitution backstory. “In Los Angeles, you see every walk of life ….You see a lot of would-be actors, the adventurous, the disenfranchised,” he explained. “[The song is] a celebration of life, ultimately, of going out and finding yourself. L.A. was a magnet for people trying to find themselves. I wanted to write this song about what I’d experienced and seen.”

== Charts ==
=== Weekly charts ===
Chart (1978)	Peak position
Australia (Kent Music Report)	18
Canada Top Singles (RPM)	1
New Zealand (Recorded Music NZ)	3
US Billboard Hot 100	1
US Cash Box Top 100	1

=== Year-end charts ===
Chart (1978)	Rank
Canada Top Singles (RPM)	7
New Zealand (Recorded Music NZ)	36
US Billboard Hot 100	22
US Cash Box Top 100	6

== Certifications ==
Region	Certification	Certified units/sales
Canada (Music Canada)	Gold	75,000^{^}
United States (RIAA)	Platinum	2,000,000^{^}
^{^} Shipments figures based on certification alone.

== See also ==
- List of Billboard Hot 100 number ones of 1978
