= Nick Gilder =

British-Canadian musician (born 1951)

- Born: November 7, 1951 (age 75); London, England
- Origin: Vancouver, British Columbia, Canada
- Genres: Rock, glam rock
- Occupation: Singer-songwriter composer actor
- Instrument: Vocals
- Years active: 1975–present
- Website: nickgilder.com

Nick Gilder is a British-Canadian musician who first came to prominence as the frontman for the glam rock band Sweeney Todd. He later had a successful solo career as a singer/songwriter.

== Biography ==
Born Nicholas George Gilder in London, Nick Gilder was raised in Vancouver, British Columbia. He began his career as front-man for the glam rock band Sweeney Todd, which later briefly featured a very young Bryan Adams. Sweeney Todd had a number one hit, "Roxy Roller," which had the top spot in the Canadian music charts for three weeks in 1976. It went on to win a Juno Award for "Best Selling Single" in 1977.

Feeling they had international scope, Gilder and fellow band member, guitarist, and songwriting partner James McCulloch left the band and signed a US record deal. His second solo album City Nights spawned the hit "Hot Child in the City" and it gave Gilder chart success in the United States. The song went to No. 1 both in Canada and the US. It earned him two more Juno Awards: "Single of the Year" and for "Most Promising Male Vocalist of the Year" in Canada as well as a People's Choice Award in the US. It failed to chart in the United Kingdom, although it was featured on Top of the Pops and also in a Hot Gossip dance routine on The Kenny Everett Video Show. Since that success, Gilder has had only minimal success in Canada and none of his releases have hit the US Top 40.

Gilder has also been successful as a songwriter for artists including Bette Midler, Joe Cocker, Pat Benatar and Toni Basil. In 1984, the band Scandal featuring Patty Smyth had a US Top 10 hit with "The Warrior" which was written by Gilder and Holly Knight; it earned him a BMI Airplay Award. The song also reached No. 1 in Canada, making him the first Canadian artist to reach the Top of the Canadian chart as lead singer for a band (Sweeney Todd with "Roxy Roller"), a solo artist ("Hot Child in the City"), and songwriter for another artist.

Gilder's songs have been used in several movies such as Youngblood with Rob Lowe, The Wraith with Charlie Sheen, Barb Wire with Pamela Anderson, Scenes From the Goldmine (it included a cameo appearance in the movie by Gilder), and in TV series Sex and the City, That '70s Show, Ed, and Nip/Tuck. Most recently one of his songs was used in the 2010 movie The Runaways, where "Roxy Roller" was featured in the beginning of the film.

Armand van Helden sampled "Rockaway" on his 2005 club hit, "When the Lights Go Down." The next year Nemesis recorded "Hot Child in the City" for their 2006 debut CD, Rise Up and Rocket recorded "Backstreet Noise" for the band's CD, Girls with Candy Hearts.

Gilder was set to release an album called A Night on the Town, A Day in the Country in 2005, but it was shelved. He returned to Canada in the mid-1990s, where he continues to tour as of 2020 (until the COVID-19 pandemic began). He has settled in the Vancouver, British Columbia area where he lives with his family.

== Discography ==
=== Solo ===
Studio albums:

- 1977: You Know Who You Are, Chrysalis Records
- 1978: City Nights, Chrysalis Records (No. 13 Can, No. 33 Billboard)
- 1979: Frequency, Chrysalis Records (No. 71 Can, No. 127 Billboard)
- 1980: Rock America, Casablanca Records
- 1981: Body Talk Muzik, Casablanca Records
- 1985: Nick Gilder, RCA Records
- 1997: Stairways, Spinner Music Group/Gilder Records
- 1999: Longtime Coming, Page Music/Oasis/Orchard

Compilations:

- 2001: The Best of Nick Gilder, EMI- Capitol Music/Razor & Tie Entertainment (The Chrysalis Years)

=== Singles ===
Year	Single	Peak chart positions		
Year	Single	US	AUS	CAN
1976	"She's a Star (in Her Own Right)"	—	—	70
1976	"Roxy Roller" (w/ Sweeney Todd)	—	29	1
1976	"Roxy Roller"	—	—	—
1977	"Runaways in the Night"	—	—	—
1977	"Rated X"	—	—	—
1978	"Hot Child in the City"	1	18	1
1978	"Here Comes the Night"	44	—	21
1978	"(She's) One of the Boys"	—	—	—
1978	"Got to Get Out"	—	—	—
1979	"(You Really) Rock Me"	57	95	35
1979	"Electric Love"	—	—	—
1979	"Metro Jets"	—	—	—
1979	"Into the 80s"	—	—	—
1980	"Wild Ones (Feeling Electric)"	—	—	26; CanCon
1980	"Catch 22"	—	—	10; CanCon
1980	"Rock America"	—	—	—
1980	"I've Got Your Number"	—	—	—
1981	"Prove It"	—	—	—
1981	"(She Talks) Body Talk"	—	—	—
1985	"Let Me In"	—	—	50
1985	"Footsteps"	—	—	93
1997	"Café Heaven"	—	—	—
1997	"You're Everything (I Want to Do)	—	—	—
2000	"Roxy Roller 2000"	—	—	—

=== With Sweeney Todd ===
Album:

- 1975: Sweeney Todd, London Records (No. 14 Can)

Singles:

- 1975: "Rock 'N' Roll Story", London Records
- 1975: "Sweeney Todd Folder", London Records (No. 36 Can)
- 1975: "Roxy Roller", London Records written by J.McCulloch (No.1 Can.)
- 1978 " Hot Child in the City " (No.1 U.S.) written by J. McCulloch

=== Songwriting contributions ===
Song	Artist	Album	Year/label
"Rated X" (N. Gilder, J. McCulloch)	Pat Benatar	In the Heat of the Night	1979 Chrysalis Records
"Is It Love" (N. Gilder, J. McCulloch)	Bette Midler	No Frills	1983 Atlantic Records
"Body Talk" (N. Gilder, Herndon)	Kix	Cool Kids	1983 Atlantic Records
"Think of Me" (N. Gilder, Martin S. Briley)	Martin Briley	Dangerous Moments	1984 Mercury Records
"The Warrior" (N. Gilder, Holly Knight)	Scandal featuring Patty Smyth	Warrior	1984 Columbia Records
"Footsteps"	Nick Gilder	Youngblood (Original Movie Soundtrack)	1985/1986 RCA/Ariola International
"Tough Love" (N. Gilder, D. Hitchings)	Patty Smyth	Never Enough	1987 Columbia Records
"Hot Child in the City" ‡‡	Nick Gilder	Hot Child in the City (Original Movie Soundtrack)	1987 Prism Entertainment/Paramount Home Video
"Scream of Angels" ‡‡	Nick Gilder	The Wraith (Original Movie Soundtrack)	1987 Live Home Video
"Don't Walk Away" (N. Gilder, Duane Hitchings) ‡	Pat Benatar	Wide Awake in Dreamland	1988 Chrysalis Records
"You Know We're Gonna Hurt" (N. Gilder, Rick Boston)	Joe Cocker	One Night of Sin	1989 Capitol Records
"You're Everything (I Want to Do)" (N. Gilder, Brett Walker)	Brett Walker	Nevertheless	1994 Empire Records
"Hot Child in the City" ‡‡	Nick Gilder	Went to Coney Island on a Mission from God...Be Back by Five (Original Movie Soundtrack)	1998 Evenmore Entertainment
"The Battle Hymn of the Republic"	Voices of Classic Rock	Voices for America (Various Artists) provided vocals	2001 Intersound Records
"Hot Child in the City" ‡‡	Nick Gilder	Going the Distance (Original Movie Soundtrack)	2010 WaterTower Music
"Roxy Roller"	Nick Gilder	The Runaways (Original Movie Soundtrack)	2010 Atlantic Records

‡ Also provided background vocals on "Don't Walk Away" & "Cool Zero"
‡‡ Not included in the soundtrack release
