= Trumpet Cornet =

1878 song by Thomas Mason

Song by Thomas Mason
- Recorded: June 22, 1878
- Genre: instrumental, nursery rhyme?
- Length: 0:23
- Songwriter(s): Thomas Mason

Audio sample
- The 23-second audio dubbed "Trumpet Cornet": file; help

"Trumpet Cornet" is a placeholder name for an 1878 song performed by Thomas Mason in a tinfoil phonograph.

== Background and recording ==
The song was recorded in St. Louis, at a hat store named Steinberg & Co, on June 22, 1878. It used a tinfoil phonograph, which had been invented by Thomas Edison in 1877.

The recording also featured the nursery rhymes "Mary Had a Little Lamb" and "Old Mother Hubbard".

== Composition ==
"Trumpet Cornet" is a rather short instrumental song set to the tune of B-flat. Its instrumentation only consists of Mason's cornet playing.

== Personnel ==
- Thomas Mason - cornet

== See also ==
- "How Long" (Paula Toledo song)
- Lostwave
- "Subways of Your Mind"
- Panchiko
- Rare groove
- "Ready 'n' Steady"
- "Ulterior Motives" (song)
