= WatZatSong =

Song identification website created in 2006

- Image of the WatZatSong website in May 2024
- Website type: Song identification and social networking service
- Available in: English and French
- Founded: 2005; 21 years ago
- Country of origin: France
- Employees: 3+
- Website: watzatsong.com
- Registration: Yes
- Launched: 2006
- Current status: Active

WatZatSong is a French music identification and social networking website created by French programmers and co-founders Raphaël Arbuz and Thibault Vanhulle in 2006.

== History ==
In 2005, Raphaël Arbuz and Thibault Vanhulle, intrigued by online music quizzes, encountered a song they couldn't recall during one of their quizzes. Vanhulle conceived an idea of creating a platform where users could hum a tune to identify songs. Arbuz embraced the concept, leading to their collaboration on coding and early production efforts from 2005 to 2006. Additionally, they hired one of Arbuz's classmate, Erez Abittan, to further develop the website.

During the website's development, Arbuz identified the creation of a Java applet for an audio recording system as the most challenging aspect. Neither Arbuz nor Vanhulle had access to a Flash server from Adobe, which provides simpler technologies for developing recording systems.

The creators subsequently published WatZatSong in 2006 following the creation of a functioning recording system. The website did not start gaining significant attention until the 2010s, when users visited the platform to identify and listen to elusive songs shared by users. One of the most popular examples is "Subways of Your Mind" by Fex, which was one of the main contributors to the site's popularity during the 2010s. The majority of website visits are still made to solve song requests, and as a result, WatZatSong averages 800,000 visits monthly. Another contributor to the sites popularity is that the website has become a notable hotspot for lost media, particularly lostwave songs. A notable example is "Ulterior Motives".

== See also ==
- Lostwave
- Lost media
- Rare groove
