= MyHouse.wad =

Doom II map

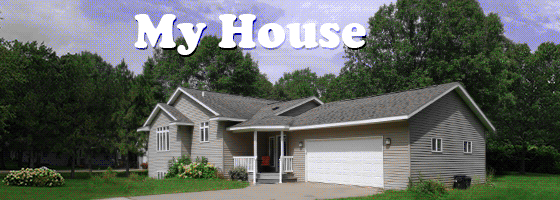
- Title screen of the map
- Developer: Steve Nelson (Note: Real name not public) ("Veddge")
- Composers: Sarah Mancuso ("esselfortium"); James Paddock
- Engine: GZDoom
- Platforms: Windows; macOS; Linux
- Release: March 3, 2023
- Genres: Psychological thriller, puzzle, subversive horror
- Mode: Single-player

MyHouse.wad (known also as MyHouse.pk3, or simply MyHouse) is a mod for Doom II created under the pen name Steve Nelson, more commonly known by "Veddge". The map is a subversive horror-thriller that revolves around a house that continues to change in shape, sometimes drastically through the use of impossible spaces. It poses as a recreation of a real suburban house made in tribute to the creator's deceased friend. The map draws inspiration from the 2000 novel House of Leaves by Mark Z. Danielewski and later reveals itself to be a horror game as the player discovers more areas of the house. MyHouse is non-linear and follows no particular plot sequence; its areas may be explored and completed at will to achieve any of six available endings. It makes extensive use of modern Doom modding features, such as portals, seamless teleportation, and scripting.

It was released to the Doom forums website, Doomworld, on March 3, 2023. Prior to its release, the author had made sporadic and small posts on the forum, detailing their progress with the development of the map; these posts act to strengthen MyHouse's backstory. Since its release it has received critical acclaim for its technical advancement, story, literary themes, and plot. It has been cited as an example of video games as literary adaptations and has been awarded a Cacoward. The map is licensed under CC BY 4.0.

== Plot ==
A journal included with the map download purports to document the process of creating it. After the death of the author's estranged childhood friend, they are gifted some of his personal effects, including an old floppy disk containing an unfinished Doom map of his house. They decide to finish the house in honor of their friend; however, as they continue work, they experience nightmares and strange events (such as new material appearing in the map, despite no recollection of doing such work). The author continues to experience insomnia and progressively more surreal and impossible dreams as they work on the map. They grow paranoid, and the map consumes the author's life, causing them to work on the project for days on end. At the end of the journal, the author believes that the map has become a sentient entity and that it is too dangerous to be shared. They intend to upload the standalone house without any of the mysterious new content but mistakenly post the "sentient" version.

In the journal, the word "house" is highlighted in blue, a reference to the odd formatting in House of Leaves. Other abnormal formatting and further similarity to House of Leaves are present in the diary as well.

== Contents ==
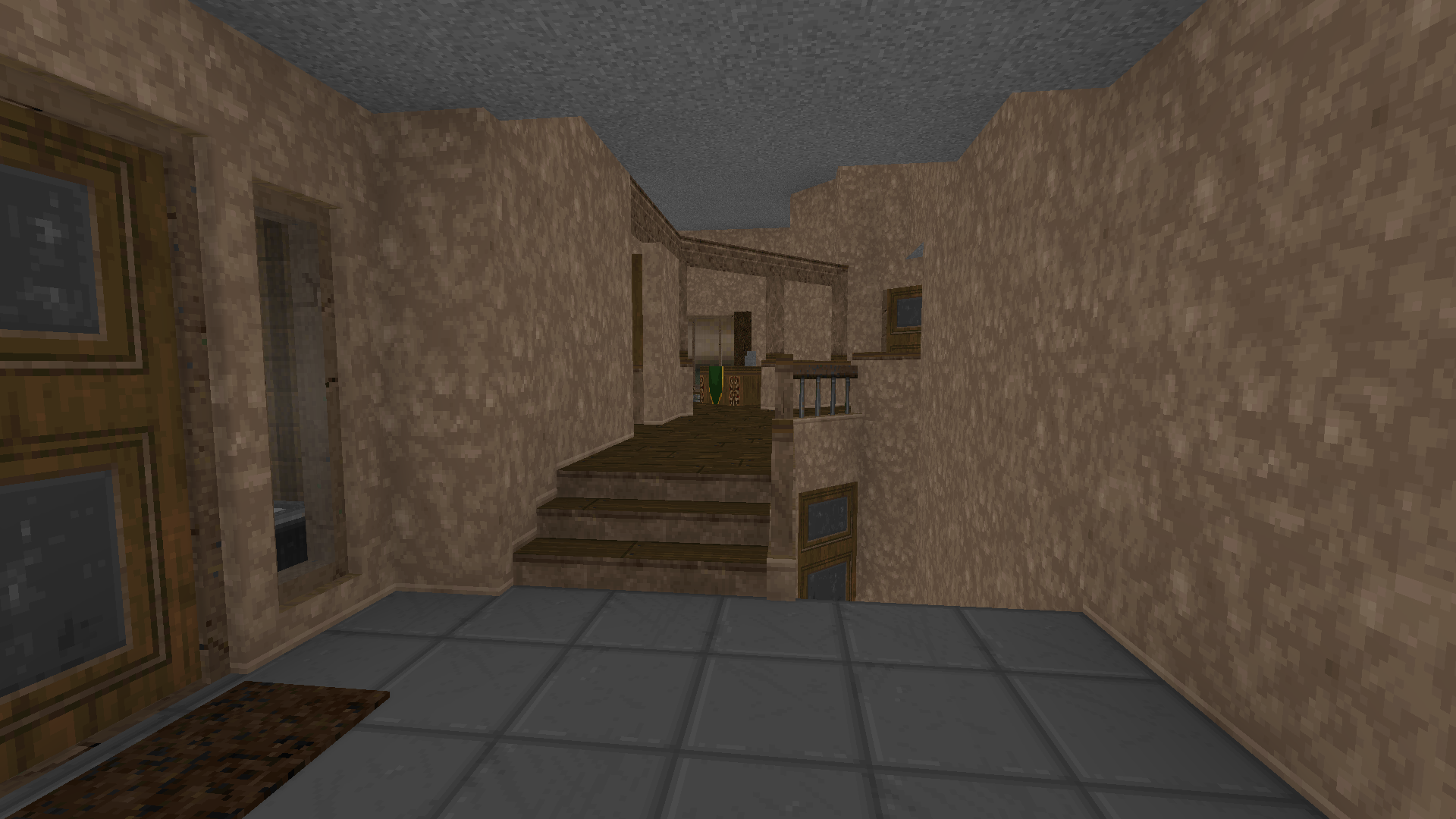
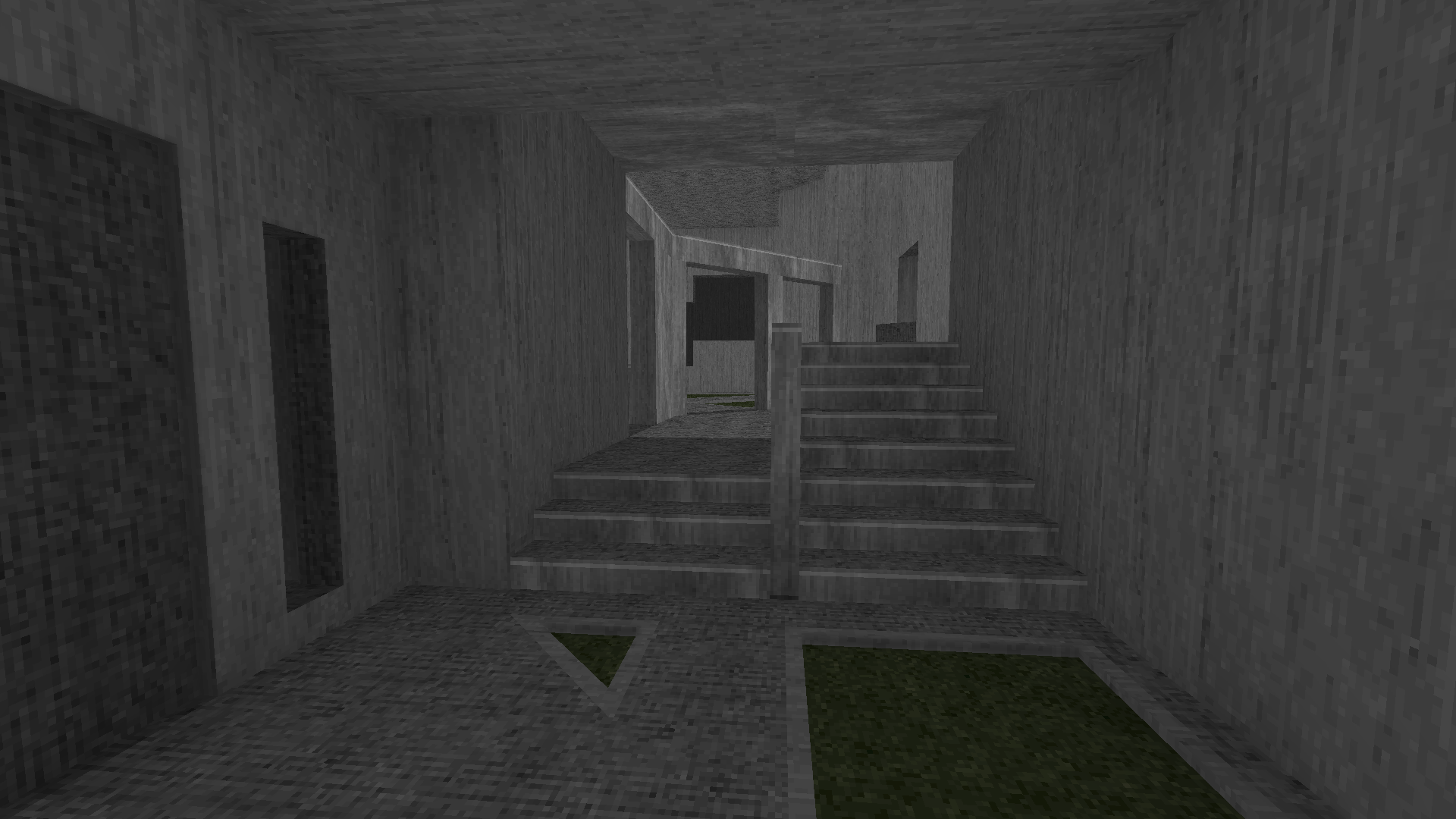
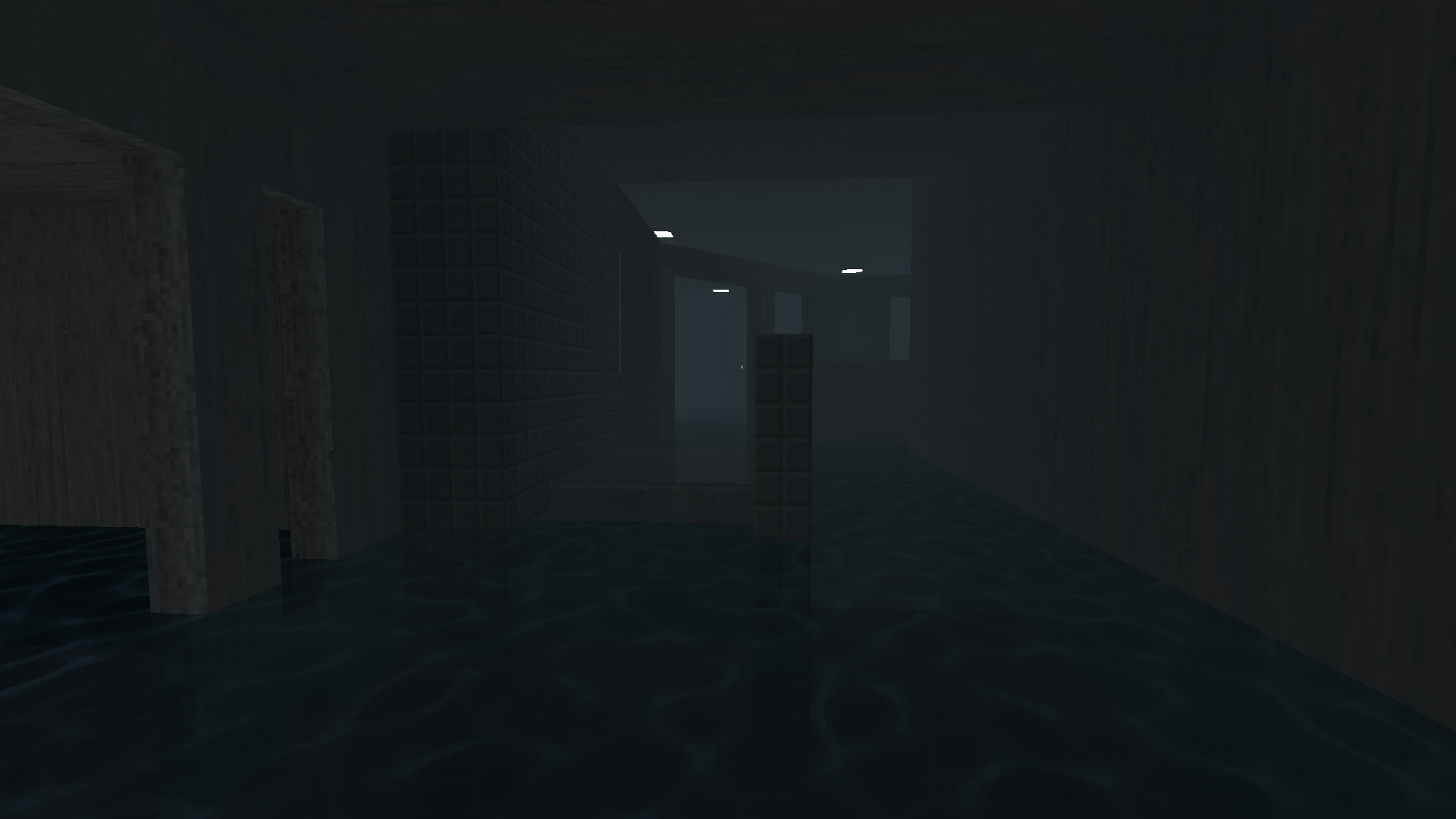
A view of inside the house from 3 versions (normal, brutalist, bathhouse), looking towards the main interior area from the front door

The map's download is a link to an online folder containing a myriad of information about MyHouse. Both a standalone WAD and PK3 file are available. Despite mass adoption of the name "MyHouse.WAD", only the PK3 file contains the vast majority of the map and is said to be forcefully added to the original Doomworld post. Alongside the file itself, there are screenshots of the map, photos of the supposed actual house, sketches of various elements of MyHouse, and a journal.

The map starts in the front yard of a suburban house, surrounded by a wooden fence with a boundless plane of grass beyond it. Inside the house are a collection of standard Doom enemies. The house begins to distort as the player explores it; at first via subtle engine tricks difficult for inexperienced players to notice, and eventually by the introduction of doors into impossible spaces which grow in size as the map progresses. At first, these are simple new rooms in the house, before evolving into new iterations of the house entirely, as well as distinct, seemingly unrelated spaces. These include a "Brutalist House" concrete apartment; a "Daycare" containing a boss fight with a mural of Shrek; a "Bathhouse" of water, lockers, and white swimming pool tiles; a "Mirrored House" containing subtle gameplay hints; a vast, featureless "Labyrinth" extremely similar to the one depicted in The Navidson Record in House of Leaves; and an "Airport" with a cryptic bathroom area and a plane ride. A looping staircase connects several of these locations through one-way doors. At a certain point, the player can interact with a breaker that sends them to a "Burnt House" variation; this locks the player out of several of the other areas as well as two endings. Areas often retain some of the house's architectural features and/or layout. The layouts of the upper floor, basement, and bedroom recur in several sections of MyHouse.

Further, more secretive areas can require greater effort to access. Eventually, the player can discover a large, looping forest road with a Shell gas station, where a car plays "Subways of Your Mind" (Note: At the time of the mod's release, the song was considered "The Most Mysterious Song on the Internet") on loop. The mirrored house provides access to "sllahrednU", (Note: Backwards for "Underhalls", the second level of Doom II) a flipped version of Doom II's second level, as well as to a mirrored version of the aforementioned "Gas Station". Dying and leaving the game idle afterwards takes the player to a circular "Hospital" area once per playthrough. Furthermore, if the player attempts to traverse MyHouse using noclip mode, going outside of the playable area of the map will teleport the player to an adaptation of The Backrooms.

These areas, beyond just the Backrooms, are commonly modeled after well-known liminal spaces. For example, the Bathhouse resembles one kind known as "poolrooms".

The player's apparent goal is to retrieve a simple Doom key gating an exit in the driveway. However, in the process, the exterior doors disappear, preventing the player from leaving. The keys the player picks up eventually become custom items with custom textures and descriptions, and "unlock" new areas by triggering subtle environment changes on pickup. Sixteen of these items, known as "artifacts", are required to obtain one ending.

Areas reference and draw connections to the sketches and journal that accompany the map's download. In one instance, the sketch drawing of many dog heads resembling Cerberus is found in the Brutalist House. Inside this area are two entities: a domesticated dog and a hellhound, separated by different scales of the area. The two dogs are invariably linked together; if either dog is killed, the other also dies.

=== Endings ===
The map contains six endings, each possible depending on either how many artifacts are collected or what areas are visited. (Note: The endings are not named, so they are commonly referred to by the order in which they are defined in the map's data, or by other community-designated names)

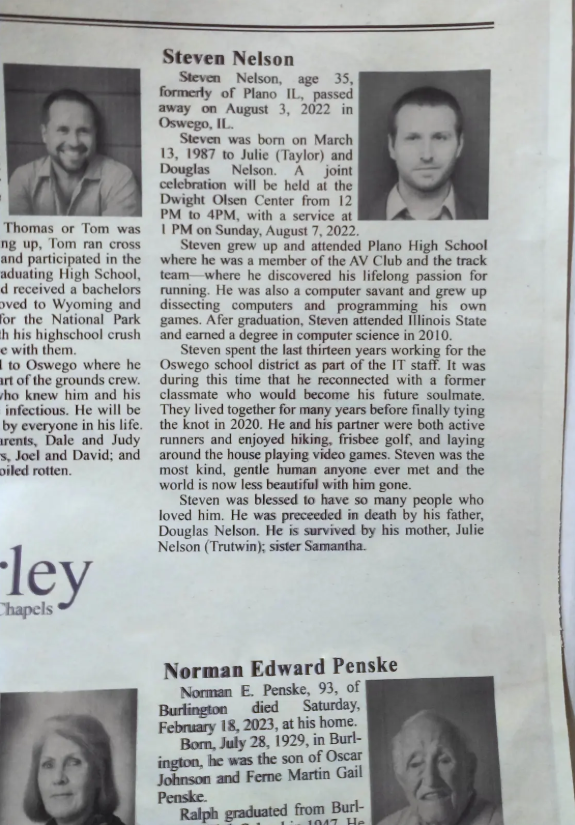
The obituary of Steven Nelson, the pen name of the mod's creator

- Ending 0 (Blue Key Ending) is achieved shortly after beginning the map, by retrieving the blue key and opening the gate. It is technically the easiest ending, as it does not require any artifacts and needs only one key item to use. Also you can jump over the barrier and get the same ending. However, it is also easy to be inadvertently and invisibly locked out of this ending by exploring the house. Going through the subsequent Doom II level, Underhalls, will send the player back to the My House level.
- Ending 1 (Abandoned House Ending) is achieved by leaving the airport with fewer than fourteen artifacts. Exiting the house will cause it to disappear instantly, and a for-sale sign to appear in its place. The sign reads "Navidson Realty", a House of Leaves reference. This ending also leads to Underhalls, similar to ending zero.
- Ending 2 (Fake Beach Ending) is achieved by going through a secret door in the mirrored version of the Gas Station. It features a fake beach placed on a movie set; the foliage and bushes are made of cardboard, and the beach view is a projected image on a sheet. The game ends on a black screen when the clapperboard at the rear of the area is used.
- Ending 3 (True Ending) is achieved by collecting all sixteen artifacts and going through the secret door in the non-mirrored Gas Station. It is the opposite of ending two, as it is a real beach. Because of this, it is also referred to as the "real beach" ending. This is considered to be the "good" ending, as it is the only Doom secret defined in the map's data. If neither dog in the Brutalist House was killed, the small dog is present, resting on the sand.
- Ending 4 (Burnt House Ending) is achieved by activating the Burnt House after having obtained sixteen artifacts. Attempting to subsequently enter the Gas Station will instead show a gravestone with a QR code showing Steve Nelson's obituary.
- Ending 5 (Sitcom Ending) was added in an update in April 2025 that made MyHouse compatible with newer versions of GZDoom. By turning a hidden TV in the brutalist house off and on again, the player can escape the fake beach from ending two, navigating areas filled with television static that play studio audience sound effects. The mirror back to the normal house no longer works, and the player can instead access a mirrored version of the gravestone area from ending four. They are then led to a mirrored version of the empty field from ending one, at which point their only option is to enter "Sllahrednu."

== Literary themes ==
The map takes direct inspiration from the novel House of Leaves in its design and references. The central setting for the map, a house that gradually changes and shifts in both appearance and function as the game progresses, is similar to the novel's subject, a mysterious house that is "bigger on the inside than on the outside". Many other areas of MyHouse bear similar architectural features to the original house, and some areas directly make reference to the novel. For example, in an ending where the house is sold, the for-sale sign reads "Navidson Realty", a reference to a main character in the novel. Another major sequence in the map contains a monstrous dog in an all-concrete maze space which directly parallels the invisible monster that haunts the dark grey endless hallways in the book. The map's supplementary information and journals also make extensive reference to the novel.

== Soundtrack ==
No.	Title	Writer(s)	Length
1.	"Entryway at the End of Time"	James Paddock	11:43
2.	"memory=entryrrrr/////"	Sarah Mancuso	7:49
Total length:			19:32

The map features two original tracks. The first is "Entryway at the End of Time" and is a remix of "Running From Evil", a Doom II track. It was composed by James Paddock. It features loops, discordant notes, and out-of-rhythm instruments as the song goes on. The second track is "memory=entryrrrr/////", [sic] composed by Sarah Mancuso ("esselfortium"). It contains many sudden cuts, noise, and splices from "Running From Evil", drawing inspiration from Everywhere at the End of Time by the Caretaker.

The map plays the unmodified "Running From Evil" in the beginning stages, as well as a version with reversed midi sequencing upon entering the map from the mirrored "Underhalls" level.

In the Shell gas station level, the NDR version of the song "Subways of Your Mind" by the band FEX can be heard from a car crashed against a tree. At the time of the mod's release, the song was unidentified, and was commonly called "The Most Mysterious Song on the Internet". After the identification of the song, articles mentioned its use in the mod; although Michael Hädrich, the band's keyboardist, expressed interest in discovering the game, the band have not reacted directly to the use of the song in the game. In the gas station itself, the track "Elevator" by Rakohus can be heard.

== Reception ==
John Romero, a cofounder of id Software and designer for Doom II, played the map over livestreams on Twitch. He praised its playtime and design, calling it "very cool" throughout his playthrough.

The map has been featured in YouTube playthroughs, documentaries, and livestreams. It has been showcased by Jacksepticeye, Vinesauce's Vinny, and others.

Mark Z. Danielewski, the author of the book that the map is modeled after, acknowledged the map's existence and impact by linking to a YouTube video explaining the connections between the game and the book.

On May 11, 2023, YouTuber Power Pak uploaded a one hour and forty-two-minute video essay detailing MyHouse's plot and mechanics. The video was viewed several million times and was listed as one of the best video essays of 2023 by the British Film Institute.

YouTuber DavidXNewton has also created a 5 part series on the map, providing a technical description on how its various design tricks are performed.

=== Critical reception ===
In a review for Rock Paper Shotgun, Saleh Karaman said that "if MyHouse isn’t already an icon of horror gaming, it soon will be" and that "there are endless layers of subtext and meta-textual connections in House of Leaves, and MyHouse mimics these, but with the copypasta horror of the internet."

Cal Jeffrey of TechSpot said: "If you play it, remember that MyHouse is like an onion. It has many layers, each revealing more lore while raising questions about the next layer." Jeffrey made reference to the accompanying story of MyHouse. He also focused on its technical advancements for a Doom map, such as areas with two floors, which is not normally possible.

PC Gamer's Wes Fenlon praised the map's creativity and design, despite the age of its underlying engine. He wrote that "Doom is 30 years old, and yet someone still used it as the vessel to build one of the smartest, most intricate games of the year. What a legacy! Play it once without looking up where to go or what to do—just explore. When you think you've seen what there is to see, look up a guide and figure out just how much more this house is hiding."

=== Awards ===
It was awarded a 2023 Cacoward, an annual award given by the Doom community for "honoring the year's top releases". The theme for the 2023 Cacowards was "Doom at 30", celebrating the release of Doom 30 years earlier.

The track "memory=entryrrrr/////" won an "Odyssey of Noises" award for Best Original Soundtrack.

== See also ==
- Doom modding – Modding in the Doom video game series
