= How Long (Paula Toledo song) =

- Cover for the 2023 Bandcamp release; on other platforms, the title reads "How Long (Will It Take)"

Single by Paula Toledo
- Released: December 13, 2023
- Recorded: c. 2003
- Genre: Jangle pop
- Length: 4:20
- Songwriter: Paula Toledo
- Producers: Paula Toledo; Jonathan Anderson

Paula Toledo singles chronology
"How Long" (2023)	"Riddle" (2024)

"How Long", officially released as "How Long (Will It Take)", or abbreviated as HLWIT, is a song recorded by the Canadian singer Paula Toledo around 2003, known for being considered a lostwave track for 16 years. Initially, it was not released commercially, being only licensed to appear in the film Secret Lives and the TV series 15/Love in 2005. Two years later, a user posted online about a bootleg DVD that contained a snippet of "How Long", prompting a search for its origin that attracted the attention of the lostwave community. In December 2023, the origin of "How Long" was discovered, and Toledo released it as a single that same month in response. Musically, "How Long" has been compared to the Cranberries.

== Background and composition ==
Paula Toledo is an artist, songwriter, and motivational speaker. She grew up in Montreal before relocating to Vancouver for college. Toledo recorded "How Long" in Langley, British Columbia, around 2003. It was co-produced by Jonathan Anderson of the Canadian band Jonathan Inc., and guitarist David Odlum of the Irish band the Frames mixed it in France. While it was initially written for her debut studio album, it was not included there. Despite this, it was well-liked in her setlists. After a show at a neighborhood restaurant, an employee from Lionsgate Entertainment inquired about licensing it. In 2005, "How Long" was licensed for Secret Lives, a made-for-TV film, and 15/Love, a youth sitcom. Because of this, and for "artistic reasons", Toledo also did not include it in her extended play. Toledo left the music field, after the death of her husband left her as a single mother.

"How Long"
"How Long" speaks to living authentically.

Toledo wrote "How Long" from her personal perspective, and believes it resonates with modern audiences because it conveys the importance of living authentically. A four-minute song, it was musically compared to the Irish band the Cranberries. Miles Klee of Rolling Stone and V. S. Wells of The Georgia Straight described it as a "yearning" track. Klee described it as jangle rock, while Wells perceived inspiration from 1980s rock and early 2000s "guitar-driven pop". Jon Azpiri of CBC News felt that "How Long" would fit well with modern adult contemporary radio and film soundtracks, due to the "wistful" vocals of Toledo and the guitar usage. Toledo tagged its Bandcamp release under folk rock, indie folk, and indie pop.

== Search and discovery ==
"How Long" was first mentioned online in August 2007, when a user on a Ukrainian forum mentioned that a snippet was featured on the menu of a Russian bootleg DVD. A small group of fans formed to uncover its origin. Only a low-quality, 45-second snippet of its chorus was available. The search became popular in the lostwave community, which is dedicated to trying to identify the provenance of songs considered unknown or lost. Because it was never released commercially, it was not possible to find it through Google or apps like Shazam. Fans initially named it "How Long Will It Take", based on a line from the chorus. Some people made tribute videos for "How Long" featuring images of teddy bears, while others created remixes and covers of it. Additionally, video essays were made about the mystery. In October 2023, a subreddit, r/HLWIT, was created, named after the initials of the unofficial title, and had one thousand members by December.

On December 8, 2023, sixteen years after "How Long" was first mentioned on the Internet, Reddit user "the-arabara" posted that he had found its origin. Initially, he tried to find the creators of the DVDs, "track[ed] down a movie mentioned on a job application", and found another obscure song in its credits. Ultimately, he found "How Long" when searching for songs titled "How Long" on the Society of Composer, Authors and Music Publishers of Canada's database. This led him to another Reddit post and ultimately to a podcast containing the full song. Reddit users commemorated the discovery on r/HLWIT.

That same day, Toledo got multiple emails about the discovery, which surprised her; she initially believed the messages to be scams. In response, she released the full version of "How Long" on Bandcamp on December 13. All proceeds from its sales in 2023 went to the Music Heals Charitable Foundation, which supports and raises awareness of music therapy. Later, Toledo released "How Long" on streaming services, including Spotify and Apple Music. However, as a result of an unofficial duplicate version of it appearing on streaming platforms, the official version was taken down, which she suspected to be because of streaming fraud. In May 2024, it was officially reuploaded to streaming services under the title "How Long (Will It Take)".

== Personnel ==
Adapted from the 2023 release on Bandcamp.

- Paula Toledo — lead and background vocals, guitar, writing, production
- Jonathan Anderson — guitar, keyboard, percussion, background vocals, production, mastering
- David Odlum — mixing
- Trevor Grant — drums
- John Bews — bass
- Lonely Girl Productions — photography

== See also ==
- Deathmetal (EP)
- Rare groove
- "Ready 'n' Steady"
- "Subways of Your Mind"
- "Trumpet Cornet"
- "Ulterior Motives" (song)
