= Slamfest '99 =

1999 Super Smash Bros. promotional event

Super Smash Bros. Slamfest '99, also known as Super Smash Bros. LIVE or simply Slamfest '99, was an official promotional event for the North American release of Super Smash Bros. on the Nintendo 64, held at the MGM Grand Adventures Theme Park in Las Vegas, Nevada, on April 24, 1999. Organized by Nintendo of America and public relations firm Golin/Harris, the event featured a real-life, staged wrestling match involving four costumed Super Smash Bros. characters performed in front of a live audience.

The wrestling match was live-streamed on the web via RealPlayer by the web broadcasting service InternetBroadcast.com. While a rebroadcast of the match was hosted on the event's official website for several months following its conclusion, no Slamfest '99 video footage is known to exist. A search effort by fans and internet archivists to find the lost footage has been active since May 2020.

== Description ==
Slamfest '99 took place in the 'Salem Waterfront' district at Las Vegas' MGM Grand Adventures Theme Park on April 24, 1999, from 11:00 AM to 1:00 PM PST. The event's primary attraction was a real-life, staged wrestling match between four costumed Super Smash Bros. characters—Donkey Kong, Mario, Pikachu, and Yoshi. Additionally, interactive demo kiosks were set up nearby, allowing attendees to preview the game. Ed Espinoza of Golin/Harris served as the event's producer and wrote the script for the wrestling match.

Performed in front of a live audience, the wrestling match had a duration of approximately 17 minutes and was performed by Cirque du Soleil actors, who choreographed the fight themselves. The match was held in a boxing ring initially slated for use in an upcoming Mike Tyson fight.

The character costumes were designed by mascot-crafting company KCL Productions, who had no involvement in the production of Slamfest '99 beyond initially providing the costumes to Nintendo. The costumes were previously used in the North American commercial for Super Smash Bros.

Promotion for Slamfest '99 was deliberately limited in scope as a cautionary exercise in the wake of the Columbine school shooting earlier that week, as it had spurred controversy surrounding violence in video games. More than 100 children from the Andre Agassi Foundation were invited to attend, as well as six members of the media, including an Associated Press photographer.

At the time, Slamfest '99 received coverage in video game magazines N64 Magazine, X64, and Nintendo Magazine System. An Associated Press photograph from Slamfest '99 was published in The Sacramento Bee, and an image of Donkey Kong from the event was published in Steven L. Kent's book The Ultimate History of Video Games.

== Firsthand accounts ==
Mario and Donkey would start the match. Donkey Kong, being much larger than our favorite plumber, quickly took Mario out. Yoshi came in and got his revenge on the gorilla. Pikachu would come in for the monkey only to be knocked down by Yoshi's lethal tail. Then, before anyone knew it, Mario went crazy. He wiped out Donkey Kong, Pikachu, and his own teammate, Yoshi. Ultimately, the match would end in a crash which knocked out everyone resulting in a draw. "Everyone's a winner!" the announcer yelled.

— Zelda 64 Planet

Even the ref got in on the act, biting Pikachu’s ear and declaring that it tasted ‘like chicken’. Mario shocked us with his low blow antics and Kong knocked himself out with his own magic hammer, but they all wound up best of friends at the end, the match being declared an honourable draw.

— N64 Magazine

Mario and Yoshi were on one team, Donkey Kong and Pikachu were on the other. It was quite funny to see the life-size mascots bouncing around a wrestling ring. Mario went on a crazed rampage hitting everyone in sight, and instead of Yoshi, Donkey Kong accidentally hit himself with his 'mallet of doom.' And in the most heated moment, all four mascot smashed into each other in the center of the ring, and all fell to the mat. That's right, in true Nintendo fashion, it was a draw...and everyone is a winner!

— Nintendorks

== Broadcast ==
The wrestling match was broadcast live on the web via Real Time Streaming Protocol (RTSP) and could be viewed in an application that supported the protocol, namely RealPlayer G2. Nintendo's website provided a link to an InternetBroadcast.com domain, which hosted an informational webpage for Slamfest '99 as well as the data for the broadcast. At the time, InternetBroadcast.com was a web broadcasting service owned by MediaOnDemand.com, Inc.

A Real Audio Metadata (.ram) file was available to download from the event's website following its conclusion, which allowed users to view a rebroadcast of the stream when loaded into RealPlayer. The .ram file was not an encoded video file, but rather metadata that would direct RealPlayer to stream the video from the URL it contained.

The URLs which hosted both the .ram file and the address it streamed the video from are currently non-functional, as are their archived counterparts in the Wayback Machine. The .ram file was originally available to download until the event's website was taken down, some seven to eleven months after Slamfest '99 occurred.

== Retrospective interest ==
In the years since it took place, Slamfest '99 has never been referenced by Nintendo; it has also maintained an extremely obscure status even among fans of Super Smash Bros. Currently, no video footage of Slamfest '99 is known to exist in any capacity.

In May 2020, André Segers of the YouTube channel GameXplain published a tweet vaguely recalling Slamfest '99, which garnered attention from members of the Lost Media Wiki. A coordinated search effort to find the broadcast footage was launched by the Lost Media Wiki in the following months. The search effort has since uncovered a variety of content related to Slamfest '99, such as photographs, magazine articles, written firsthand accounts, and references to the event on archived websites in the Wayback Machine. Additionally, a talking Donkey Kong plush figure from the 'Nintendo Collectibles' line was found featuring promotional material for the event.

In February 2023, a collection of new high-quality photographs from Slamfest '99 were uploaded to social media by members of the Lost Media Wiki. The photos were provided to the Lost Media Wiki by Slamfest '99's producer, Ed Espinoza.
