= LMW =

LMW or lmw may refer to:

- Lakshmi Machine Works, an Indian textile machinery manufacturer
- LMW, the station code for Laki Marwat Junction railway station, Pakistan
- lmw, the ISO 639-3 code for Lake Miwok language, United States
- Lost Media Wiki
