= Rare groove =

Music that is obscure or very hard to source

Rare groove is music that is obscure or very hard to source. Rare groove is primarily associated with funk, R&B and jazz funk, but is also connected to subgenres including jazz rock, reggae, Latin jazz, soul, rock music, northern soul, and disco. Vinyl records that fall into this category generally have high re-sale prices. Rare groove records have been sought by not only collectors and lovers of this type of music, but also by hip-hop artists and producers.

Online music retailers sell a wide selection of rare groove at more affordable prices, offering fast downloads in digital format. This availability and ease of access has brought about a resurgence of the genre in recent years.

== History and development ==
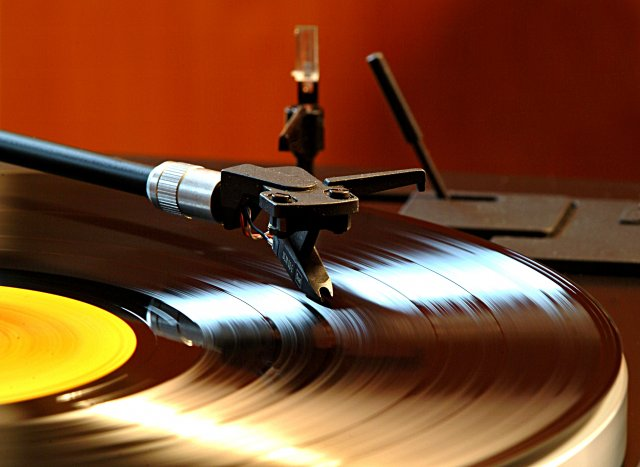
Collecting rare vinyl records is an important aspect of the rare groove scene.

In the UK, the term 'rare groove' was originally coined by the British DJ Norman Jay, after his The Original Rare Groove Show on pirate radio station Kiss 94 FM (the progenitor of Kiss 100 London). While Norman Jay was actually a witness to, and participant in, the 1970s underground sub-culture of American obscure import music, the person who actually gave rise to the genre (some even credit him with the revival of James Brown's career), although there was no name for it at the time, was underground DJ Barrie Sharpe and Lascelles Gordon (previously with the Brand New Heavies). Both played that brand of obscure American import records, 7" and albums ("looking back retrospectively"), that they had in their collection. These were bought from such specialist import record shops such as Moondogs in East Ham, and Contempo record shop at 42 Hanway Street in the West end of London, owned by John Abbey, founder of Blues & Soul magazine. The magazine also had their own record label (also called Contempo), releasing music from the 1970s which, starting in 1984, played at a club previously known as Whisky-A-Go-Go, founded by Rene Gelston in Wardour Street, Soho (which would later become known as The Wag).

Norman Jay's show was a collaboration with DJ Judge Jules and featured a mainly urban soundtrack from the 1970s and 1980s mixed with early house music. Tracks similar to "rare grooves" had begun to see a following in the 1970s Northern soul movement, which curated a collection of rare and obscure soul records for play in dance clubs.

The rare groove scene began when DJs presented an eclectic mix of music, that placed a particular emphasis on politically articulate dance-funk recordings, connected to the US Black Power movement. Pirate radio stations and DJs participated in a "recovery, repackaging and retrieval" of obscure music that reflected, related to or translated inequalities of race and gender and the struggles of the civil rights movement. Music that had failed to gain acceptance in a previous time was given a "new lease on life" by DJs on pirate radio stations. Rare groove also provided a musical space where the "symbolic capital" of the music became very important. Northern soul is a part of the rare groove scene since the term was first given by deep soul collector Dave Godin from the record shop Soul City in Covent Garden, London. The scene has many record collectors and DJs who pay large sums of money for rare songs from the 1960s/'70s/'80s/'90s that are original copies.

In America, DJ Kool Herc, Grandmaster Flash and Africa Bambaataa played 70s rare groove records. James Brown, Jimmy Castor Bunch, and Incredible Bongo Band were on their playlists. A popular source of breakbeats was the bootleg series Ultimate Breaks and Beats. The longest-running rare groove radio show in the United States is Soul Power on WWOZ 90.7 FM (New Orleans) and wwoz.org, and is hosted by DJ Soul Sister, who is cited as the "queen of rare groove". The show began in 1996.

== Sampling ==
Sampling is one of the biggest aspects of hip-hop and rap, and these types of records provide breaks for artists to use in their songs. Examples of rare groove samples, such as Eazy-E's "Eazy Duz It" (which samples the Detroit Emeralds, Bootsy Collins, Funkadelic, Isley Brothers, Sly and the Family Stone, the Temptations and even Richard Pryor), can be found in modern hip-hop (notably G-funk's heavy sampling of Funkadelic).

Schoolly D used samples such as James Brown, Lyn Collins, the J.B.'s, and Maceo & the Macks on album Am I Black Enough for You (1989). DJ Chuck Chillout used samples such as Kool & the Gang, Cameo, Cymande, Talking Heads and Incredible Bongo Band. Stezo also used Lyn Collins, George Clinton, Kool & the Gang and Spoonie Gee.

After the 1970s disco boom was over, many musicians (Bee Gees, Donna Summer, Village People, etc.) who had fame and spotlight in the genre's heyday faded away. Much of the obscure music rediscovered as samples in newer house or hip-hop tracks is labeled "rare groove" retroactively.

== See also ==
- Record collecting
- Lost media
- Lostwave
- Ready 'n' Steady
- "Subways of Your Mind"
- "Ulterior Motives" (song)
- P-Funk
- Vinyl revival
- Hip-hop culture
- "How Long" (Paula Toledo song)
- Panchiko
