= Love or Nothing (disambiguation) =

Love or Nothing is the 22nd studio album by Japanese singer-songwriter Miyuki Nakajima, released in October 1994.

Love or Nothing may also refer to:

- Love or Nothing, third collection of poetry of Douglas Dunn 1974
- "Love or Nothing", single by Uriah Heep from Fallen Angel 1978
- "Love or Nothing", single by Diana Brown & Barrie K. Sharpe 1991
