= Paul Baskerville =

English radio DJ (born 1961)

- Born: 3 March 1961 (age 65); Manchester, England
- Occupation: Radio DJ
- Children: 1

Paul Baskerville (born 3 March 1961) is an English radio disc jockey (DJ) on the German radio station Norddeutscher Rundfunk (NDR).

== Life ==
Baskerville was born and grew up in Manchester. As a teenager, he joined the punk band The Limit. He moved to Germany in 1980. Initially, he worked for Karstadt. He started working for NDR in 1981 with features about music from England and especially Manchester. In 1982, he got his first weekly show, Musik für junge Leute which he moderated every Thursday from 13:20 to 14:30. He also moderated the shows "No Wave", "Kopfhörer", and "Offbeat". Over the years, he got different slots. He also did shows for Radio Bremen, Deutschlandfunk, DT64, and reportages for Arte. He also wrote a music column for the weekly paper Freitag ("Friday"). Currently, he broadcasts the show Nachtclub ("nightclub") which ran from 2003 to 2020 on NDR Info on Saturdays from 0:05 to 2:00 and moved in 2021 to NDR Blue on Thursdays at 21:00. One of the most important record stores for his program Musik für junge Leute was the now defunct unterm durchschnitt based in Hamburg.

Baskerville is married and has a daughter named Emely. He lives in Hamburg.

In 2019, Baskerville was one of many people who were contacted during the search for "The Most Mysterious Song on the Internet", which was recorded from the radio in the early 1980s in Northern Germany and eventually identified in November 2024. He suspected that the song was a demo recording that was played once by an NDR presenter and then thrown away.
