= Diana Brown & Barrie K. Sharpe =

Diana Brown & Barrie K. Sharpe were the act behind the early 1990s music style of groundbeat, an acid jazz/rare groove offshoot that had its roots in the London area and old soul vinyl record shops.

The duo first came to attention in the late 1980s, signing to London Records dance offshoot label, FFRR. They released singles such as "The Masterplan", "Love or Nothing" and "The Sun Worshippers (Positive Thinking)", as well as the album, The Black, the White, the Yellow and the Brown.

== UK singles discography ==
Year	Single	UK	Album
1989	"Blind Faith"	—	Single only
1990	"The Masterplan"	39	The Black, the White, the Yellow and the Brown (And Don't Forget the Redman)
1990	"Sun Worshippers (Positive Thinking)"	61	The Black, the White, the Yellow and the Brown (And Don't Forget the Redman)
1991	"Love or Nothing"	71	The Black, the White, the Yellow and the Brown (And Don't Forget the Redman)
1992	"Eating Me Alive"	53	The Black, the White, the Yellow and the Brown (And Don't Forget the Redman)
"—" denotes releases that did not chart.
