= Lost Media Wiki =

Lost media database

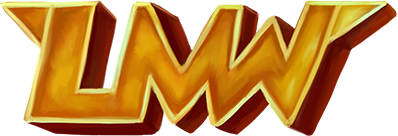
- Website type: Wiki
- Available in: English
- Founded: November 2012; 13 years ago
- Founder: Daniel "Dycaite" Wilson
- Website: lostmediawiki.com

The Lost Media Wiki (LMW) is a wiki dedicated to listing and organizing lost or hard-to-find media, as well as promoting events to search for specific lost media. It was created in 2012 by Daniel Wilson, better known as Dycaite.

== Creation ==
The idea for the site emerged in 2011 when Dycaite participated in an online investigation forum on the 4chan website about paranormal subjects, after discovering the 2000 film Cry Baby Lane, which had been broadcast on Nickelodeon. In November 2012, Dycaite founded the Lost Media Wiki group after a suggestion from one of the members to move his personal list to a complete website.

== Reception ==
As of April 21, 2020, the Lost Media Wiki recorded over 3,000 items separated into categories of found, partially found, partially lost, existence unconfirmed, non-existent confirmed, and lost.

The site also organizes searches for specific media in online forums and petitions for the archiving of other content. One of the most notable campaigns promoted by the site was the search for a removed cutscene from the PlayStation game Spider-Man 2: Enter: Electro which featured Thor, as well as the prototype for the video game sequel to George Orwell's Nineteen Eighty-Four. Other lost media cases include the pilot episode of Family Guy, which was found; Slamfest '99, a promotional event for Super Smash Bros. that remains lost; Mean Girls, an unreleased video game based on the film of the same name that was found, but left unreleased to the public; and O parádivé Sally, a Czech short that aired on the series Pinwheel. Search efforts for O parádivé Sally began after an Internet user known as Commander Santa shared his recollection of it online in 2012, with the short being found in 2017.
