= Subways of Your Mind =

1985 former lostwave song by FEX

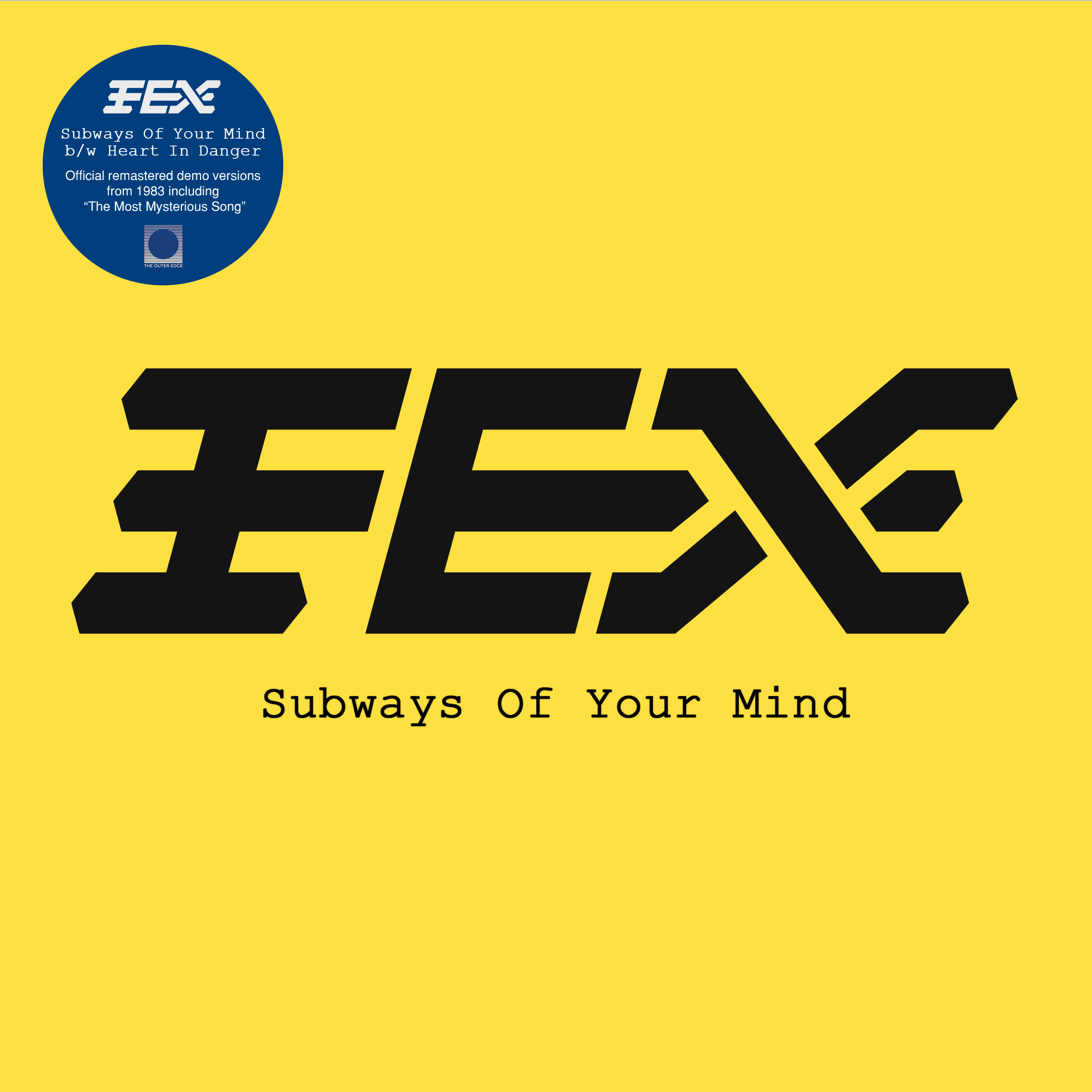
- Official artwork of the 2024 digital/vinyl studio version rerelease

Single by Fex

from the album Skyscraper
- B-side: "Heart in Danger" (2024 single) "Talking Hands" (2025 single)
- Released: 1985 (Note: 1985 (original studio release) 20 December 2024 (official studio rerelease) 26 December 2024 (official 1985 live performance release) 14 January 2025 (NDR radio version digital release) 14 March 2025 (NDR radio version physical release) 1 October 2025 (official music video release))
- Recorded: July-August 1984
- Studio: Hawkeye Studio, Ganderkesee (studio version) "Löffelstudios"/Heikendorf practice room (NDR version); Heikendorf practice room (Rehearsal version)
- Genre: New wave
- Length: 3:06 (NDR demo version); 3:54 (1985 studio version); 4:25 (Heikendorf rehearsal recording)
- Composers: Ture Rückwardt; Michael Hädrich
- Lyricist: Ture Rückwardt

"The Most Mysterious Song" version single cover
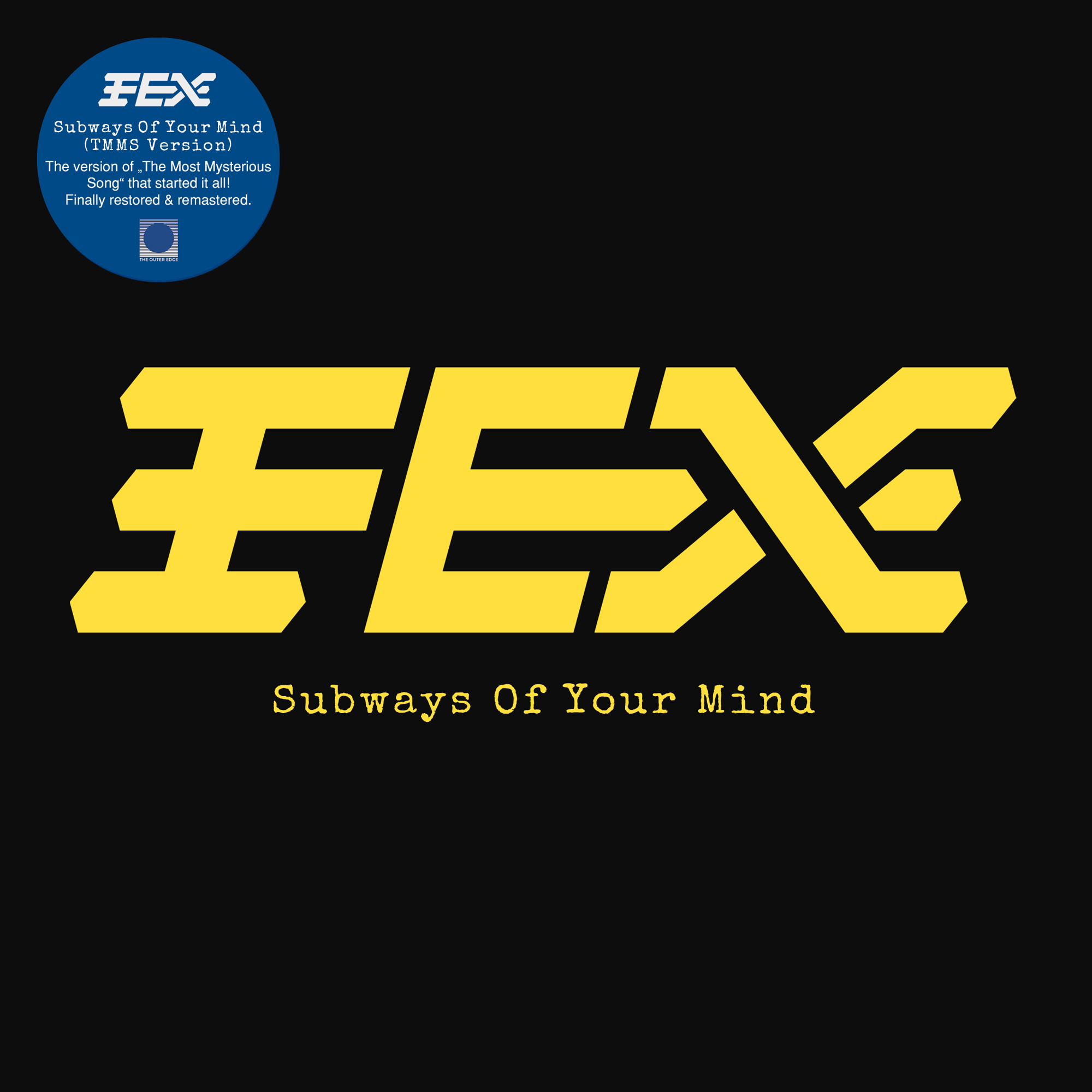
- Cover of "The Most Mysterious Song" vinyl single release, February 2025

Live single cover
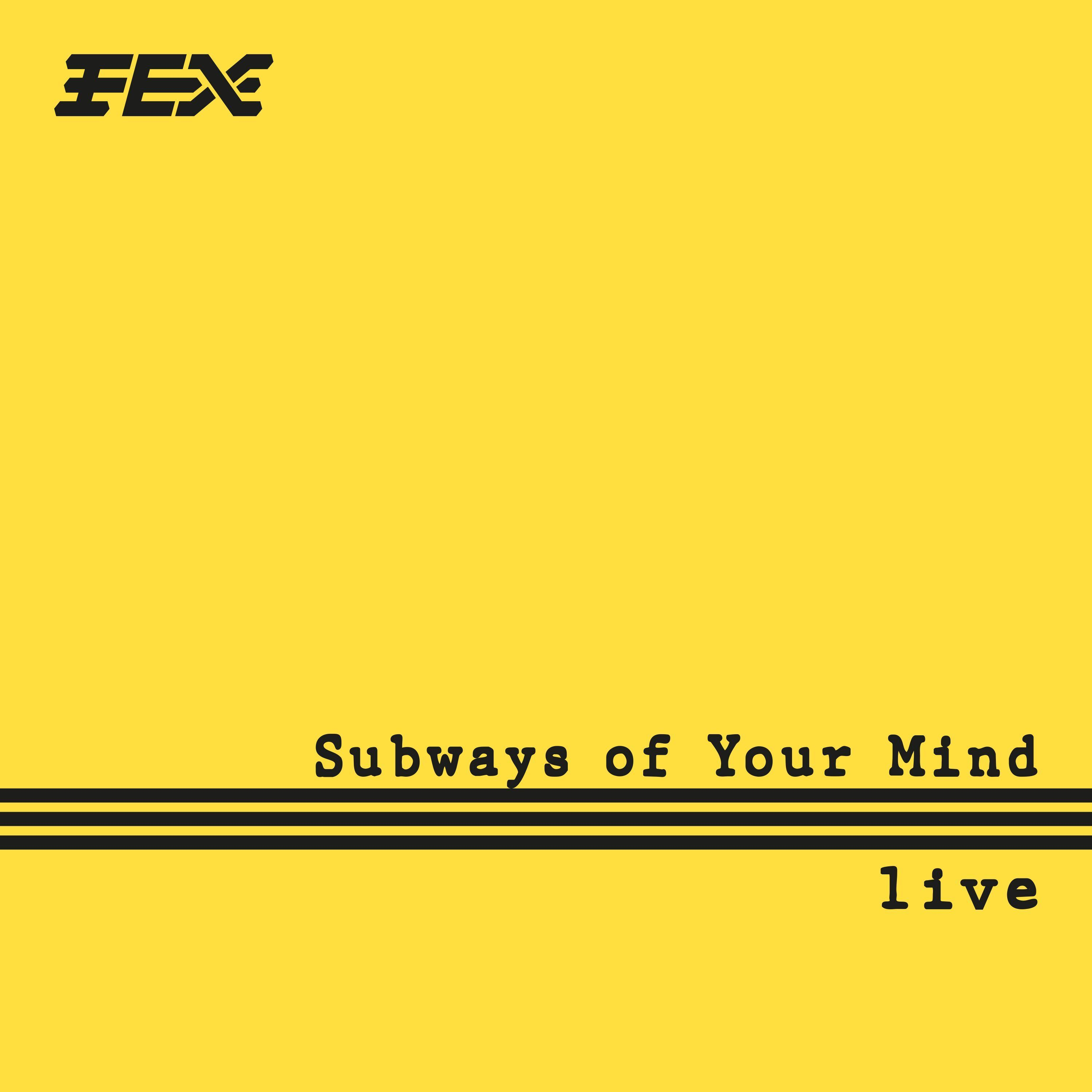
- Cover of the 1985 live single, released 26 December 2024

Music video
- "Subways of Your Mind" on YouTube

"Subways of Your Mind" is a single by German new wave band Fex, recorded in 1984. In 1985, a demo cassette tape containing the song was released to promote the band's live tour across Northern and Central Germany, with the tape itself being primarily sold at the tour. On 18 March 2007, a cassette tape recording from a radio broadcast in the mid-1980s was uploaded online and garnered significant attention. The song remained unidentified, even after being uploaded to the Internet. This prompted a 17-year-long search to identify the artist and song title. During this search, the song earned the nickname "The Most Mysterious Song on the Internet". (Note: Also known as "Like the Wind", "The Sun Will Never Shine", "Blind the Wind", "Check It In, Check It Out", "Take It In, Take It Out", and "Summer Blues" after lines in fan-interpreted lyrics. "Subways of Your Mind" was also correctly speculated to be the name. Sometimes referred to as "The Mysterious Song". Often acronymed as LTW, TMMS, TMS and TMMSOTI.)

The song was recorded privately in Wilhelmshaven from a radio broadcast during the mid-1980s, possibly around 1984. In 2019, it became the subject of a viral Internet phenomenon, with many users of sites such as Reddit and Discord collaborating to identify the song and recording artist.

On 4 November 2024, the song was identified by Reddit user u/marijn1412 as "Subways of Your Mind" by Fex, a rock band from Kiel. Confirmation came with the release of a 1985 EP featuring a studio version of the song, as well as a recording of a live performance in the same year. On 12 January 2025, the daughter of the band's keyboardist Michael Hädrich posted to the Reddit community formed around the song that her father had found a cassette copy of the NDR version that had been played on German radio around 1984. The copy was released as a digital single the following day. However, the ¼ master tape containing this version has yet to be found. On 4 November, a higher-quality version of the NDR broadcast version of the track was found on tape in lead singer Ture Rückwardt's archives and uploaded to Bandcamp, containing an extended fadeout.

"Subways of Your Mind" is one of the most famous examples of lostwave, music of obscure or unknown origins.

== Composition ==
The song has been described by Rolling Stone as a new wave track. In an interview shortly after the song had been found, Fex's keyboardist, Michael Hädrich, gave an account of the song's inspiration and meaning:

Well, Ture, he's the composer, so he could answer this best, but I know what his opinion is on this. It is the mixture of the "no future" atmosphere at that time – remember, it was the Cold War in the eighties, everyone thought eventually someone is going to hit the red button, so this was the atmosphere, and so the song had this "sun will never shine" parts in it – but also "the young and restless dreamers". So there are always positive lines in it that give a contrast to the melancholic part of the song. And I think this contrast, this mixture of positive and fear, makes the song so attractive, yes? Simplicity – somehow, it has a simplistic charm to it, and it transports this atmosphere.

— Michael Hädrich, After Hours Café, WRDV

== Recordings ==
=== Studio ===
Three different studio recordings of Subways of Your Mind are known to exist. The first time the song was recorded was in June 1984, about a month before the NDR version, at the practice room building of the band, located in Heikendorf. This recording is of worse sound quality than the later recordings due to having been recorded from a microphone next to a bass amp, and due to time. The recording also does not have finished lyrics, or a complete line-up, as Michael Hädrich was not present for this rehearsal, and as such does not play on this recording. The bassist on this recording is Jörg Lemcke, who also provided the recording.

The second recording of the song took place between the rehearsal and studio sessions, featuring the same line-up as the rehearsal albeit with Michael Hädrich on keyboard. It was once believed to have been released in 1983 with Volker Schenk, Lemcke's predecessor in Fex, due to his remembering about it and an alleged vinyl release. However, this was proven false by Jörg Lemcke, who recalled the day Rückwardt first came up with the song and started rehearsing it with the band, debunking the possibility of the song being recorded in 1983 with Volker, as he had left before the song was composed. Prior to the confirmation that Lemcke played on this version, it was rumoured that the bassist might have been Rückwardt. This recording, named "NDR recording" by the community, was recorded in "Löffelstudio", a name used by Hase, Fex's sound engineer at the time, for any place where he kept his mixing equipment, while the session took place in the same practice room as the rehearsal. This is the version of the song that was aired on NDR, although it's unknown how it was broadcast there. The intro on this recording is shorter than the other two, with a fade-out ending. On one of the copies, the beginning of a new keyboard part can be heard. According to Hädrich, each copy of the song had an individual fadeout. It was later found out that Hase had painstakingly ripped cassette copies from the reel-to-reel tape for each band member because he had to add different fade-outs for each cassette.

The third and professional studio recording of this song, which is featured on their 1985 EP sold during their tour, was recorded in November 1984 at Hawkeye Studios in Ganderkesee, produced by Jeff Burke and mixed by Hase. The longer intro and ending from the Heikendorf recording are kept, with NDR keyboard parts being kept and developed. Norbert Ziermann plays bass on this recording. Additionally, the lyrics between all three recordings feature differences.

== Radio broadcast ==
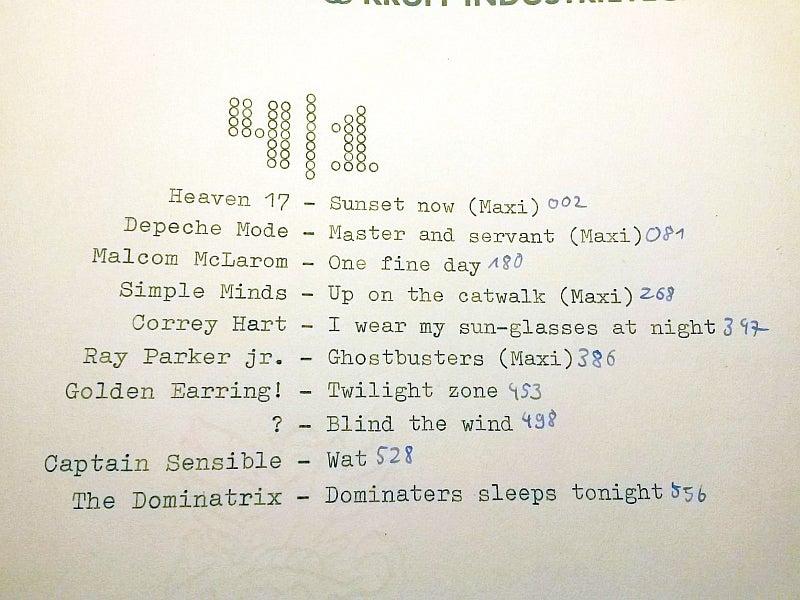
The track list of Darius' BASF 4|1 tape that includes "Subways of Your Mind" (labelled as "Blind the Wind"), and a question mark indicating that the artist was unknown

A German teenager named Darius S. (from Wilhelmshaven) recorded the song from a German public radio station program in the 1980s. He recorded the song on a cassette tape and made a mixtape, which also included songs from XTC and the Cure. To get clean recordings of songs, Darius purposely removed dialogue from the radio hosts, which is likely why the exact airplay date and the title were unknown.

Later on, Fex determined the song was probably broadcast at the beginning of September 1984, having no idea in which show or how the song could be broadcast on the NDR.

== Online search ==
In 2004, Darius' older sister, Lydia H., bought him a website domain as a birthday present, which he used to raise awareness of the unidentified songs in his collection. He then digitised his radio recordings, saving the songs as .aiff and .m4a files, and uploaded them to his site, named Unknown Pleasures after the 1979 album by English post-punk band Joy Division.

On March 18, 2007, Lydia began her online search for the song on a Usenet group, but later migrated to websites with song identification tools. She posted a 1:15 excerpt of the song to best-of-80s.de (a German forum devoted to eighties synth-pop) and to The Spirit of Radio (a fan site dedicated to Canadian radio station CFNY-FM). The song slowly spread across the Internet, being uploaded to WatZatSong in 2009 and to YouTube in 2011. Spanish indie record label Dead Wax Records posted the excerpt of the song to their YouTube channel in 2017. This caught the attention of Gabriel Pelenson, a friend of Dead Wax owner Nicolás Zúñiga, who began searching for the song's origin in 2019.

Pelenson uploaded the excerpt of the song to his YouTube channel and many music-related Reddit communities, and eventually founded r/TheMysteriousSong. Searchers made contact with individuals potentially pertinent to the search, such as NDR disc jockey Paul Baskerville, German performance rights organization GEMA, and YouTube channel "80zforever", which posts obscure music. Baskerville agreed to play the song on his then-current radio show Nachtclub on July 21, 2019. Although no new leads came of it, it did make Lydia and Darius aware of the new wave of investigation, and Lydia subsequently became involved with the Reddit community in August.

=== Theories ===
"Subways of Your Mind"
The ending section of "Subways of Your Mind". During the search of the song, some users had theorized that the Yamaha DX7 synthesizer, which was released in late 1983, was heard in the ending of the song. This was later confirmed by Fex's keyboardist Michael Hädrich.

Searchers generally agreed that the singer had a European accent, but the specific type was unclear at the time. Some users had theorized that the Yamaha DX7 synthesizer, which was released in late 1983, was used in the leads. This was later confirmed by Fex's keyboardist Michael Hädrich.

There had been some speculation that the song was recorded in 1984, since most of the other songs on the cassette tape were released around that time. Further evidence for this is that the Technics tape deck which Darius S. likely used to record the song was manufactured that year. NDR Radio disc jockey Paul Baskerville was approached in 2019 but did not remember playing the song. He suspected that it was a demo recording that was played once by a radio presenter and then thrown away.

One article from March 2021 claimed that the song was likely written and performed by Viennese singer Christian Brandl and drummer Ronnie Urini in 1983, with both German and English versions. The song would have been recorded in the studio of the late Fred Jakesch on Mariahilferstraße in Vienna. Alto saxophonist Heinz Hochrainer said he was present for a planned saxophone element, but that was never recorded. A preliminary mix of the song then would have made its way to a radio station in 1984. Urini corroborated the story and also provided an old typewritten version of the German lyrics as evidence. However, Robert Wolf, Brandl's musical colleague and the frontman of their band Chuzpe, invalidated the argument, saying that he did not recognize Brandl's voice in the song and that the drums sounded more like an electronic drum machine than Urini. Following the discovery of the song's name and band, Urini claimed to the press that the recordings that surfaced were forged by AI, and that he did not want to be further involved with the search.

== Viral internet phenomenon ==
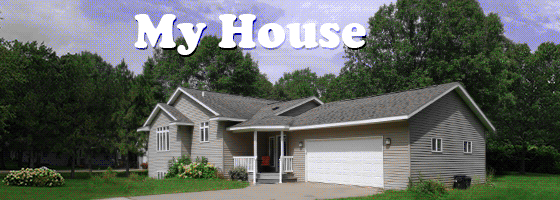
In pop culture, "Subways of Your Mind" was used in the 2023 Doom II mod MyHouse.wad. At the time of the mod's release, the song was still considered "The Most Mysterious Song on the Internet".

On May 27, 2019, Australian music news website Tone Deaf wrote the earliest article focusing on the song, with author Tyler Jenke discussing the preliminary stages of the search for the track and noting that the search was similar to a 2013 search for a song which was ultimately identified as "On the Roof", the English version of "Lämna någonting kvar" by Swedish musician Johan Lindell.

Between 2019 and 2021, American YouTuber Justin Whang posted five episodes of his series Tales from the Internet discussing the song and the progress of the search. His videos further galvanized Internet users to contribute to the effort to identify the song.

In addition, a number of covers and remixed versions of the song have been created, including a cover by American band Mephisto Walz titled "Like the Wind" and released on their 2020 album All These Winding Roads. In March 2023, the song was used in MyHouse.wad, a Doom II mod posted to the Doomworld forums by the pseudonymous user "Veddge". As described in PC Gamer, "you can find it playing from the open door of a lonely car, several layers deep into the inception-style madness that plagues the mod". The song's cryptic nature led it to be widely associated with the "liminal space" internet aesthetic.

== Identification and aftermath ==
On November 4, 2024, Reddit user u/marijn1412 claimed to have identified the song as "Subways of Your Mind" by the German band Fex. While researching bands who participated in Hörfest, an annual event highlighting lesser-known musical artists, the user contacted a Fex band member listed in an issue of the German newspaper Nordwest-Zeitung. According to the user, the band member confirmed that Fex was the creator of the song and planned to re-release it as a result of it being unearthed. One member of Fex, Michael Hädrich, confirmed the story to German tabloid tz, while the band's lead singer, Ture Rückwardt, participated in an interview with the Kiel newspaper Kieler Nachrichten, further corroborating the story.

On November 7, 2024, three of the four original members of the band, Hädrich, Rückwardt and bassist Norbert Ziermann, performed an acoustic version of the song for the German radio station NDR 1 Welle Nord in Kiel. Sievers had not yet rejoined Fex at the time and was absent from this recording, which does not feature any drums.

The song later made a licensed appearance in the 2025 horror film Black Phone 2; the film is set in 1982, and an early scene has the character Finney (Mason Thames) watching an episode of the variety series Night Flight, which airs a "Subways of Your Mind" music video. On October 1, 2025, the band officially released the music video for the song, featuring Darius as a special guest.

== Track listing ==
=== Studio version ===
All tracks are written by Ture Rückwardt and Michael Hädrich.

No.	Title	Length
1.	"Subways of Your Mind"	3:53
2.	"Heart in Danger"	4:37
Total length:		8:30

=== TMMS version ===
No.	Title	Writer(s)	Length
1.	"Subways of Your Mind (TMMS Version)"	Ture Rückwardt, Michael Hädrich	3:06
2.	"Talking Hands"	Ture Rückwardt	4:04
3.	"Subways of Your Mind (TMMS version) (1st Remaster)"	Ture Rückwardt, Michael Hädrich	2:54
Total length:			10:04

== Personnel ==
=== Studio versions ===
- Ture Rückwardt – composer, lead vocals, guitar
- Norbert Ziermann – bass (1984 studio version)
- Michael Hädrich – keyboards, guitar, backing vocals (NDR radio version, 1984 studio version (Note: Michael Hädrich was not present during the Heikendorf rehearsal overall.))
- Hans-Reimer Sievers – drums
- Jörg Lemcke – bass (NDR radio version, Practice room rehearsal version)

=== Live versions ===
- Ture Rückwardt – lead vocals, electric guitar, acoustic guitar (2024 NDR Unplugged performance)
- Norbert Ziermann – bass, acoustic bass guitar (2024 NDR Unplugged performance)
- Michael Hädrich – keyboards, electric guitar, backing vocals, acoustic guitar (2024 NDR Unplugged performance), drum machine (2025 Lutterbeker concert)
- Hans-Reimer Sievers – drums
- Jörg Lemcke – bass (1984 Lutterbeker concert)
- Ilona Rückwardt – backing vocals (1984 Lutterbeker concert)

== See also ==
- Lost media
- Rare groove
- Deathmetal (EP)
- "How Long" (Paula Toledo song)
- "Ready 'n' Steady"
- "Ulterior Motives"
