= Lostwave =

Music of unknown origin

Lostwave is a term for music with little to no information available about its origins, including song titles, names of the musicians or bands who were involved, and recording and release dates. Lostwave songs have been the subject of online crowd-sourced efforts to uncover their origins.

== History ==
Lostwave gained prominence from two sources. The first was the search for "Ready 'n' Steady", a song that briefly appeared on the 'bubbling under' addendum to the Billboard Hot 100 and was noted by musical historians and collectors as seemingly not existing anywhere. Decades of searching and speculations of it being a copyright trap ended when the song was found in 2016. The second was with the search for "The Most Mysterious Song on the Internet", recorded from the German radio station Norddeutscher Rundfunk (NDR) in the mid-1980s, likely in or after 1984, by Darius S. In 2007, Darius' sister, Lydia H., uploaded the song to best-of-80s.de and The Spirit of Radio, sparking widespread interest across various internet fora. In 2024, the song was identified as "Subways of Your Mind" by German new wave band Fex.

With other examples of lostwave appearing online, a Reddit community of the same name was created in 2019 to distinguish it from the search for "The Most Mysterious Song on the Internet" and bring more attention to the topic. This was the first usage of the term 'lostwave', which uses the same naming format which stems from "new wave", similar to internet microgenres, such as vaporwave and chillwave.

== Notable examples ==
=== "Ammunition" ===
"Ammunition" is the third track on the album Fetish Fetish (1994) by Canadian alternative rock band All Good Children. The song was recorded in 1993 from a Hamilton, Ontario radio broadcast by Robin and Erin Hanson, who compared the song to U2. The song remained unidentified until late 2015, when it was identified after being broadcast on CBC Radio One to bring attention to the search.

=== "CIA" ===
"CIA" is the placeholder title of an unidentified new wave song circulating online as a taped radio broadcast from Ontario-area station CFNY-FM that is believed to have been recorded onto cassette in the mid-1980s, or more specifically in 1984. "CIA"'s earliest online appearance dates back to February 2020, when user datafreq posted the song onto Reddit. A few months later on July 20, 2020, its presence spread to YouTube by user DJFormaldehyde, who reposted "CIA" asking for others to "help me find this song." CBC.ca journalist Kate Bueckert remarked that "the song sounds topical of the 1980s, with a vibe that may remind listeners of bands like A Flock of Seagulls, Platinum Blonde, The Cure, The Romantics or Duran Duran."

A common theory is that the band behind "CIA" hails from the Kitchener-Waterloo metropolita located in Southern Ontario, or somewhere "a little bit" beyond the nearby Greater Toronto Area. Joe Gaschler, a moderator of a Reddit subforum dedicated to tracing the song's origin, recounted to Canadian news outlet CBC.ca that he spoke to many people who worked with CFNY-FM in the 1980s about "CIA". Most notable among them are Liz Janick and Ivar Hamilton, who have once hosted programs (Streets of Ontario and The Original Import Show, respectively) on the station. Janick stated to Gaschler that "there is no record of it ['CIA'] anywhere. Trust me.", after finding no traces of the song in CFNY-FM's archives.

=== D>E>A>T>H>M>E>T>A>L ===
In 2016, a 4chan user asked for help identifying a demo EP of D>E>A>T>H>M>E>T>A>L by Panchiko which he had found in an Oxfam shop in Britain. Despite the band name, album name, and cover art being visible, the band members (Owain, Andy, Shaun, and John) were identified only by their first names. Further, there was no information about the band or its members online. In 2020, the band members were identified by using metadata from the price sticker to geolocate the charity shop to Sherwood, Nottingham, and contacting Facebook users with the same first names in the Sherwood area. The band has since reunited and gone on multiple international tours; they also made a debut album.

=== "How Long (Will It Take)" ===
"How Long (Will It Take)" is a song by Canadian musician Paula Toledo that was licensed for use in the TV film Secret Lives and the series 15/Love. Snippets from the song were used on the menus of two Russian bootleg DVDs containing multiple movies each. The search for the song began when it was posted to a Ukrainian message board in August 2007, where it became known as "How Long Will It Take". In December 2023, user the-arabara found the song after searching the database of Society of Composers, Authors and Music Publishers of Canada. After Toledo learned of the search for her song, she uploaded it to Bandcamp and other streaming services, with the funds from the Bandcamp page being donated to the Music Heals Charitable Foundation. Soon after, fake versions of the song began to appear on streaming services, which she suspected to be streaming fraud.

=== "On the Roof" / "Stay (The Second Time Around)" ===
"On the Roof" is a song by Swedish musician Johan Lindell, initially known as "Stay (The Second Time Around)". It remained unidentified until 2013 when a listener of Swedish radio show PP3 played the song in hopes that others would recognize it. Lindell had since abandoned music to pursue a career in painting, and was unaware of the search.

=== "Ready 'n' Steady" ===
"Ready 'n' Steady" is a song by American musicians Dennis Lucchesi and Jim Franks, credited as D.A, which was recorded in 1979. Despite never being publicly or commercially released, the song debuted on the Billboard's Bubbling Under Hot 100 chart at number 106, rising to number 102 before disappearing from the chart. To date, the song is the only song without an official release to appear on a Billboard chart. The song's existence was in question for many years; however, the track was confirmed to be real in 2016. It was aired on KFAI in Minneapolis, Minnesota, US, that same year. This is the only known instance of it being aired on radio.

=== "Spelling on the Stone" ===
"Spelling on the Stone" is a single recorded by an Elvis impersonator and released in 1988 by LS Records with no credited artist. The song peaked at number 82 on the Billboard Hot Country Songs chart. The song is from the perspective of Elvis Presley and alludes to speculation that he faked his death. Music historians have speculated that Dan Willis, who recorded with LS Records, was the vocalist; however, this is unconfirmed.

=== "Subways of Your Mind" / "The Most Mysterious Song on the Internet" ===
"Subways of Your Mind" was recorded by teenager Darius S. from a radio program that aired on the West German public radio station Norddeutscher Rundfunk. The song was recorded to a cassette tape, which also included other songs by the bands XTC and the Cure. To get a clean copy of the songs, the DJ chatter was removed, which is possibly why the song's exact airplay date was unknown.

The song was first posted online between 2004 and 2007. However, the search for it did not gain traction until 2019, when Brazilian teenager Gabriel da Silva Vieira learned of it from Nicolás Zúñiga of Spanish independent record label Dead Wax Records. He uploaded the excerpt of the song to YouTube and several music-related Reddit communities, eventually founding r/TheMysteriousSong.

On 27 May 2019, Australian music news website Tone Deaf wrote the earliest article focusing on the song. Author Tyler Jenke discussed the preliminary stages of the search. He also noted its similarities to the 2013 search for a song eventually identified as "On the Roof" by Swedish musician Johan Lindell.

Also in 2019, DJ Paul Baskerville was thought to be related to the song, as it was believed to have been taped off of his program Musik für junge Leute ("music for young people"). He suspected, before the song was found to be by Fex, that it was a demo recording that was played once by an NDR presenter and then discarded.

On 4 November 2024, Reddit user marijn1412 identified the song as "Subways of Your Mind" by the band Fex. An alternate recording of the song was attached. On November 7, 2024, three members of Fex performed an acoustic version on NDR.

=== "Ulterior Motives" / "Everyone Knows That" ===
In 2021, WatZatSong user carl92 uploaded a 17-second snippet of a song recorded between 1982 and 1999; he claimed to have found the recording amongst files in a DVD backup, and speculated that it was a leftover from when he was learning to record audio. He also claimed that the snippet was from 1999 and possibly from Spain, where he claimed to live. Initially, users referred to the song as "Everyone Knows That" due to the lyrics of the snippet.

The search for the song was initially slow to gain traction, but gained a dedicated following over time. A subreddit dedicated to finding the song was created, with two of its members being interviewed by French commercial TV network TF1 on 7 January 2024. Theorized sources for the song included a 1990s MTV broadcast, production music, or a commercial jingle.

On 28 April 2024, the song was identified by Reddit users u/One-Truth-5867 and u/south_pole_ball as "Ulterior Motives" by Christopher and Philip Booth, from the 1986 pornographic film Angels of Passion.

== See also ==
- Lost media
- Rare groove
- Search by sound
- List of Internet phenomena
