= Ready 'n' Steady =

1979 song by D.A.

Song by D. A.
- Recorded: 1979
- Genre: Pop rock
- Length: 3:15
- Label: Rascal
- Songwriters: D. A. Lucchesi; Jim Franks

Audio sample
- file; help

"Ready 'n' Steady" is a song by American musicians Dennis Lucchesi and Jim Franks, recorded in 1979. The song appeared on Billboard's Bubbling Under the Hot 100 chart for three weeks in June 1979, despite not being released as a record, and possibly not even receiving airplay. The song was credited to Lucchesi's first and middle initials, D. A., which he had used as his stage name as a regional performer.

For decades, the identity of D.A. was unknown. Further, no evidence of the song, nor any recording of it, could be found. This led many record collectors to consider the song a "phantom record" that possibly did not even exist. In 2016, researcher Paul Haney used copyright records to trace and find the recording, giving the song its first known public exposure.

== On the Billboard Bubbling Under chart ==
The June 16, 1979, issue of Billboard listed 10 records on its Bubbling Under Hot 100 Singles chart, a chart which lists songs ranking just below entry onto the magazine's main chart, the Billboard Hot 100; the Bubbling Under rankings began with position number 101. One of these was "Ready 'n' Steady" by D.A., listed at the number 106 position (sixth among the ten Bubbling Under records). The record, listed as being released on the Rascal label, moved up to number 103 on June 23, then up to number 102 the following week before disappearing from the chart.

== Whitburn's research ==
American author and music historian Joel Whitburn, whose company, Record Research Inc., specializes in researching the Billboard charts, published various books containing chart data over the years. He collected thousands of records, including all of the 45s ever to hit the Hot 100 or Bubbling Under charts—all except "Ready 'n' Steady".

In a 1995 interview, Whitburn said he had never actually seen or heard the record. He added, "We think—we think—that it's a girl's rock group from Chicago. Punk group, we think—1979. And we think that the Rascal label was out of a guy's home in Detroit." The Chicago female band DA! denied any link to the record, though Whitburn had suggested a connection. Whitburn had found a small ad for a Rascal label located in Detroit in a punk rock publication, but by then the address was a boarded-up vacant house. The entry in Billboard shows "Ready 'n' Steady" had a catalog number of 102; if there was a Rascal 101 released, it remains unknown to collectors.

In the fourth edition of Whitburn's Bubbling Under the Hot 100 book, published in 2005, the entry for "D. A." was amended with a note stating, "The existence of this record and artist is in question", and quotes a price of $150 as its value. In 2009, Whitburn published his latest Top Pop Singles book, which includes both Hot 100 and Bubbling Under singles—but D. A. was not listed at all. In an interview with the website CelebrityAccess, Whitburn noted he still had not been able to find "Ready 'n' Steady" and said, "I don't think it exists". Whitburn also thought the song's listing on the chart could have been a copyright trap by Billboard.

The 2002 16th edition of Jerry Osbourne's Official Price Guide to Records listed the record, with a value of $75–125, along with an unnamed LP on the Frontline label, dated 1985 or 1986. This is actually the album Fearful Symmetry by the Christian rock band Daniel Amos, which sometimes used the abbreviation "D.A.".

== Resurfacing ==
The United States Copyright Office catalog contains a registration of a song titled "Ready & Steady" with authorship credited to D. A. Lucchesi and Jim Franks; it was registered on September 16, 1986, with a creation date of 1979. Dennis Armand "D. A." Lucchesi (June 5, 1945 – August 18, 2005) was an American mortgage broker and part-time musician from California who performed locally as "D. A. and the Dukes."

In 2016, further investigation into this copyright registration by Paul Haney, of Record Research Inc., led to co-author Jim Franks, who provided Haney with a recording of the song. According to Haney, the song was recorded by Steve Cropper, but never released. As for how it appeared on the charts without any records for sales or airplay, according to Haney, a record promoter with a major label took an interest in the band and somehow managed to get the song listed on the Billboard chart; this makes "Ready 'n' Steady" the only song ever to appear on any Billboard listing without actually being released. The Rascal label, at that time, existed only on paper and was owned by a relative of one of the band members; in 1984, Rascal (based in Hollywood) would issue a few independent singles, though nothing by D.A.

"Ready 'n' Steady" was most likely never played on radio until Haney appeared on the Crap from the Past radio show on KFAI in Minneapolis, Minnesota, on July 8, 2016, during which the recording was aired.

On May 19, 2017, Crap from the Past did a phone interview with Jim Franks. He stated that the personnel for the song was:

- Dennis Lucchesi – lead vocals
- Jim Franks – guitar
- Ira Walker – bass
- Stu Blank – piano
- Dean Revelo – drums
- Meredith Lucchesi – background vocals
- 2 unknown female background singers

== See also ==
- Lostwave
- "Subways of Your Mind"
- "How Long" (Paula Toledo song)
- Lost media
- "Ulterior Motives" (song)
