= Ulterior Motives (song) =

1986 song by Christopher and Philip Booth

- This image of the NextPlay "Pink Funk" boombox became closely associated with the song.

Song by Christopher and Philip Booth
- Published: 1986
- Released: 22 June 2024 (re-recorded version); 29 May 2026 (original master from 1985)
- Recorded: August 1985 mid-2024 (re-recorded elements)
- Studio: Master Control Studios, Burbank, California
- Genre: New wave; synth-pop
- Length: 3:40 (Original 1985 master); 3:48 (2024 remake)
- Label: NWS Music Group & Spooked Music Releasing
- Songwriters: Christopher Booth; Philip Booth
- Producers: Christopher Booth; Gary Goetzman

"Ulterior Motives" is a song recorded by British-Canadian musicians and filmmakers Christopher and Philip Booth, first appearing in the 1986 pornographic film Angels of Passion. It has gained popularity since 2021 after a seventeen-second snippet of the song, at the time unidentified, was posted online. The song was colloquially dubbed "Everyone Knows That" (commonly abbreviated EKT) or "Ulterior Motives", both derived from the then-debated lyrics of the snippet. (Note: "Ulterior Motives" was correctly implied to be the song's name, and the lyric turned out to be "Everyone knows it".)

The snippet was uploaded to song identification website WatZatSong in 2021 by Spanish user carl92 who claimed to have discovered the recording in an old DVD backup. He speculated that the file was leftover from when he was learning to record audio. It was shared across various social media sites and internet communities, initiating a widespread search for the full song and information about its origin. In February 2024, The Guardian named it "one of the biggest and most enduring musical mysteries on the internet".

On 28 April 2024, Reddit users identified the snippet's origin as being from Angels of Passion. At the time, the vocals, guitar and synth tracks for the original recording were deemed lost. As such, the Booth brothers re-recorded the song and included it on their album Ulterior Motives (The Lost Album), released on 22 June 2024. The album was credited to Who's Who?, a name the Booth brothers had performed under at various points in the 1980s.

In October 2024, the Booth brothers announced that they were investigating a 'new lead' in the search for the original master of "Ulterior Motives." They suggested that a tape recording of the original version is in the possession of a copyright registration office whom they contacted to request its release. Christopher stated that if the office can return the tape to them, they will release it "as soon as [they] find it". On 28 April 2026, the Booth brothers announced that the original studio master of Ulterior Motives had been found. The following month, the re-recording was included in a scene in the horror film Backrooms (2026).

== Background and composition ==
"Ulterior Motives" was recorded and produced by Gary Goetzman and Mike Piccirillo in August 1985 under the band "T42", also known as "Tea For Two", at Master Control Studios in Burbank, California. The song was intended to be released by Capitol Records, alongside with "Nothing Lasts Forever", but they were dropped by the label due to internal issues. Because they were "doing anything to make money", they worked as production assistants on films. One of their friends, who made pornographic films, needed music for one of their works. According to Christopher, "they gave us quite a bit of money just to give them some music to use behind the scenes". As such, "Ulterior Motives", which was originally recorded as a pop song, was used in the soundtrack of the 1986 pornographic film Angels of Passion.

The song was created using a LinnDrum for the drums, a Fender Stratocaster for both lead guitar and rhythm guitar, a Kurzweil K250 for additional backing synthesizer and lead synthesizers (koto) and a Yamaha DX7 for the backing synthesizers (E-Piano)s. The bass and bass player is unknown. Samples were obtained from a Fairlight CMI and then sampled on a Ensoniq Mirage. The song has three distinct orchestra hits samples: the first appears in the intro and the instrumental break and is an edited version of the "Orch 2" sound. The second appears several times throughout the track, particularly in the chorus, its origin is unknown, although Christopher stated it is a heavily modified version of "Orch 2". The third also plays in the chorus, its origins are unknown too.

Christopher stated that the song has different meanings like "a girl that cheating", saying "she was saying one thing and you found out that she did another thing", or about "the reflection of the music industry being ruthless", saying "that they were often taken advantage of, with people promising to make them stars while "offering them nothing in return". Described as a new wave and synth-pop song, "Ulterior Motives" was written by the Booth brothers, with Christopher serving as the song's producer and lead vocalist, and Philip providing background vocals and an electric guitar track. Its 2024 re-recording would involve Philip providing the electric guitar and Christopher on keyboards.

== Online search ==
Original snippet
The original 17-second snippet of the song that was uploaded to WatZatSong by carl92 in 2021

On 7 October 2021, user carl92 uploaded a 17-second snippet of the song to WatZatSong and asked for help identifying it. He wrote that he "rediscover[ed] this sample between a bunch of very old files in a DVD backup. Probably I was simply learning how to capture audio and this was a left over." The song was thought to have been recorded in the 1980s due to its stylistic similarities to pop music of that time, specifically after 1983, since the LinnDrum drum machine and the Yamaha DX7 synthesizer were thought by the sleuths to have been used in the song. Some users created reconstructions from the original snippet to have an idea of what the full song could be like, while others theorised that the song was a hoax "planted by a troll". It became WatZatSong's "most infamous and enduring submission", receiving the most comments since the site's launch in 2006. The song gained popularity online in late 2022 and 2023, and a subreddit dedicated to finding the song and its artist was launched in June 2023. On 7 January 2024, two members of the subreddit were interviewed by French commercial television network TF1.

Following carl92’s post, one of the first people to upload the clip to YouTube was a user named JayKay. They accompanied the clip with an edited photo of a portable CD player, a “boombox”, from the brand NextPlay, specifically the “Pink Funk” model. The original photo had been posted on Depop by a user named gettheseclothes, who was attempting to sell the boombox. After the video was released, people started using the photo of the boombox to represent the song.

The search for the song was initially slow to gain traction, but gained a dedicated following over time. Search participants theorised that the source for the song might be a 1990s MTV broadcast, a piece of production music, or a commercial jingle. Carrie O'Grady of The Guardian named it "one of the biggest and most enduring musical mysteries on the internet". In August 2023, user u/HeyScarlett found a registered song by the name "Ulterior Motives" in Canadian music database SOCAN under the shareholders' names "Booth Christopher David" and "Booth Philip".

=== Discovery and legacy ===
On 28 April 2024, following a lead from Reddit user u/One-Truth-5867 who had found a similar sounding song by the same artist, user u/south_pole_ball identified the song, including its name and artists. The snippet was discovered to be from the 1986 pornographic film Angels of Passion. On 29 April, Christopher publicly made an Instagram post regarding the discovery of the song's source and the artists. He later uploaded a reel showcasing the original lyrics for the song within his recording studio, revealing that the original lyrics were "everyone knows it" instead of "everyone knows that". In a CBC News podcast, Booth claimed that the song was not written exclusively for the film. On 1 May, in a Rolling Stone interview, the duo revealed plans to release a new album with songs similar to "Ulterior Motives"; he had already found the song's original "rhythm track" but not the vocal track. Several days later, Christopher gave an interview with a Redditor, in which he clarified that he located the guitar, bass, and drum tracks, but not the original vocal or synth tracks. In another interview the Booth brothers conducted on 15 May, Christopher stated that he believed the rest of the masters for "Ulterior Motives" to be in the possession of his recently deceased friend, whose niece had planned to send the Booths a box of masters once in the possession of her relative.

On 7 June, when responding to a Redditor asking if the vocal track was indeed in that box of masters, Christopher confirmed that the masters had arrived and that he had located other songs from them, but not the vocal track, which he would re-record along with the guitar track. On 19 June, the Booth brothers released a trailer for Ulterior Motives – The Lost Album, showcasing their new version of "Ulterior Motives". The album was finally released on all streaming platforms on 22 June, under the name Ulterior Motives (The Lost Album). In an Instagram Q&A conducted on 29 June, Christopher confirmed the rhythm track of the original "Ulterior Motives" was used in the remake.

In October 2024, the Booth brothers announced that they had begun investigating a "new lead" in the search for the original master of "Ulterior Motives". They suggested that a tape recording of the original version is in the possession of a copyright registration office whom they had contacted to request its release. Christopher stated that if the office can return the tape to them, they will release it "as soon as [they] find it".

John Booth, the older brother of Christopher and Philip and former drummer of the 1970s Canadian rock band Sweeney Todd, sent the twins a batch of tapes containing several recordings of music they had made. The brothers received the tapes on 12 March 2026. Later that same day, at 6:00 p.m., "Ulterior Motives" and the song "Nothing Lasts Forever" were discovered on a tape labeled "T42 – Aug 1985."

On 28 April 2026, the Booth brothers announced on YouTube the finding of the cassette containing the original 1985 master recording of "Ulterior Motives". At the end of the video, it was also announced that the song would be released on a bonus CD to be bundled with a DVD containing a documentary about the search. On 29 May, the full version of the master recording was released. It was also included in a scene in the horror film Backrooms (2026) that same month. On 11 June, Christopher announced publicly of the death of Phillip via an Instagram post.

== Ulterior Motives (The Lost Album) ==
Ulterior Motives (The Lost Album)

Studio album by Christopher and Philip Booth (as Who's Who?)
- Released: 22 June 2024
- Recorded: 1981–1989; 2024 (Ulterior Motives re-recording)
- Genres: New wave; synth-pop
- Length: 53:19
- Label: Spooked Music Releasing
- Producer: Christopher Saint Booth

Christopher and Philip Booth (as Who's Who?) chronology
| Ulterior Motives (The Lost Album) (2024) | Animal in Me (The Lost Album Vol. 2) (2024) |

Ulterior Motives (The Lost Album) is the debut album by the British-Canadian music duo Who's Who?. Released on 22 June 2024 through Spooked Music Releasing, it contains both the Booth brothers' remake of its title track as well as twelve other 1980s-era recordings found while searching for the masters to said song. The album was credited to Who's Who?, a name the Booth brothers had performed under at various points in the 1980s.

=== Tracklist ===
All tracks are written by Christopher Saint Booth and Philip Adrian Booth.

| No. | Title | Length |
|---|---|---|
| 1. | "Chemistry" | 3:18 |
| 2. | "Your Guy" | 4:12 |
| 3. | "Ulterior Motives (2024 re-recording)" | 3:48 |
| 4. | "Man Needs Love" | 2:48 |
| 5. | "So in Love" | 5:04 |
| 6. | "You Turn Me On" | 5:00 |
| 7. | "Rock Me to Sleep" | 6:43 |
| 8. | "Think I'm Gonna Cry" | 2:17 |
| 9. | "Potion of Emotion" | 4:18 |
| 10. | "One Last Look" | 3:37 |
| 11. | "Nothing Lasts Forever" | 4:20 |
| 12. | "Language of Love" | 3:50 |
| 13. | "Lie School" | 4:04 |
| Total length: | | 53:19 |

== Personnel ==
Credits are adapted from Tidal.

Original recording (2026 release)

- Christopher Saint Booth – vocals, writing, production
- Philip Adrian Booth – writing, background vocals, electric guitar
- Gary Goetzman – production
- Mike Piccirillo – keyboards
- Alex Savant – mastering second engineer
- Blake Arnold – mastering second engineer
- JJackB – mastering second engineer

2024 re-recording

- Christopher Saint Booth – vocals, writing, production, Keyboards
- Philip Adrian Booth – writing, electric guitar,

== See also ==
- "Subways of Your Mind"
- "How Long" (Paula Toledo song)
- "Ready 'n' Steady"
- Lostwave
- Lost media
- Panchiko
