= Fex (band) =

German new wave band

FEX
- FEX in 1984

Background information
- Also known as: Modulators (1980-1983)
- Origin: Kiel, West Germany
- Genres: Post-punk; new wave; synthpop; Neue Deutsche Welle (early)
- Years active: 1980–1988; 2024–present
- Label: The Outer Edge
- Members: Michael Hädrich; Ture Rückwardt; Norbert Ziermann
- Past members: Hans-Reimer Sievers; Ilona Rückwardt; Dirk Reichardt; Jörg Lemcke; Volker Schenk; Karl-Heinz Eckert; Manfred Fox; Heino R.; Hase
- Website: fex-band.com

Fex (stylized as FEX) is a German post-punk and new wave band based in Kiel, having formed there in October 1980. They are best known for their song "Subways of Your Mind", also known as "The Most Mysterious Song on the Internet", the subject of a 17-year-long internet search to identify the song title and original artist.

Although the band only released a six-track tape during their original tenure, keyboard player Michael Hädrich revealed during a Reddit AMA that FEX "had songs for a full 2 set concert". One of the tape's songs, "Jenny", also appeared on the compilation album Zeus Top Hits in 1985. Fex reformed in the wake of the search for "Subways of Your Mind" and began releasing more songs in late 2024, the first being "Goldrush". In December 2024, Hädrich discovered the NDR version of "Subways of Your Mind" in his storage; it was made available for streaming in January 2025.

== History ==
=== Formation and original tenure (1980–1988) ===
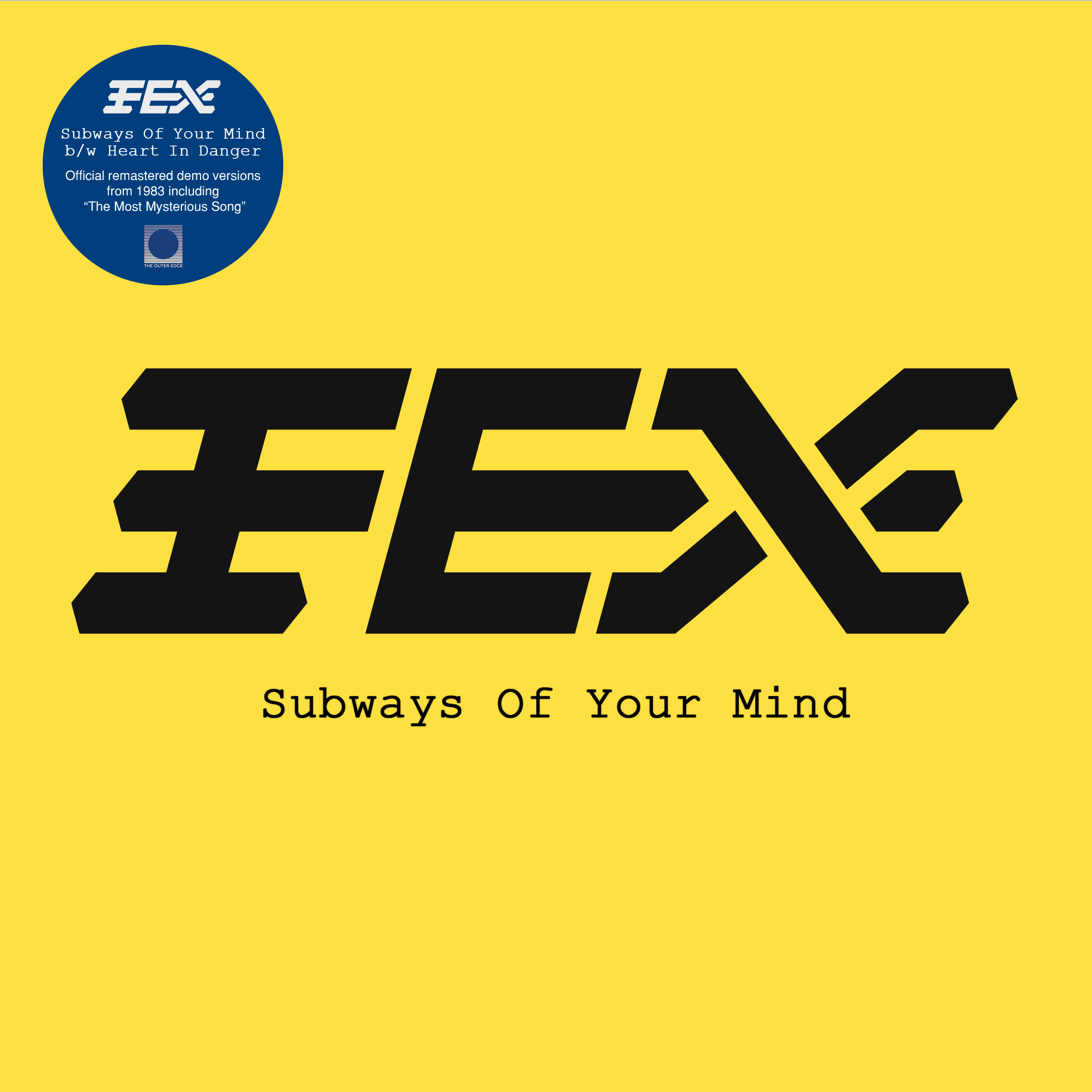
Official artwork of the 2024 digital/vinyl studio version rerelease of Subways of Your Mind.

Fex was originally known as Modulators, which formed in the fall of 1980 after the disbanding of lead singer Ture Rückwardt's previous band Sunshine Caravan. Initially, the band consisted of Rückwardt on guitar and vocals, Karl-Heinz "Kalle" Eckert on keyboard, Norbert Ziermann on bass, and Rückwardt's cousin Manfred Fox on drums. The band was reconfigured a year later, adding Rückwardt's wife Ilona as a vocalist and Michael Hädrich as a second keyboardist. Heino R replaced Fox as drummer.

Modulators combined German lyrics with elements of new wave, punk, and electronic music. They released a four-track vinyl titled Hygiene in 1982 recorded at "Löffelstudios" with engineer Hase. Hädrich, Ziermann, and Heino all left the band shortly afterwards. Ziermann and Heino were replaced with Volker Schenk and Hans-Reimer Sievers, respectively, while Hädrich was not replaced.

In summer 1983, Modulators changed their name to Fex and started rehearsing in a bunker at the Heikendorf industrial area. The band name derives from the Southern German slang word Fex, akin to "zealot" or "nerd", describing someone passionately enthusiastic about something. Karl-Heinz Eckert left the band in November 1983, and Schenk left to join a jazz band shortly afterward in the same month. Michael Hädrich returned to replace Eckert, while Schenk was replaced by Jörg Lemcke. Hädrich also played guitar for the band. Hase continued to be the mixing engineer for the band. By August, Ilona Rückwardt had gone on maternity leave. Ture Rückwardt became lead vocalist, with Hädrich providing backing vocals and second guitar in addition to keyboards. Around this time, Fex recorded several songs on a demo tape, including "Subways of Your Mind", which was broadcast on NDR 2 in September. In the same time, Fex started to gain more exposure outside Kiel with their participation in the Newcomer Show music competition, which was hosted in 1984 by radio and television personality Manfred Sexauer and organized by Hamburg-based insurance broker Zeus. The competition was held nationwidem Fex performed in September at the Glocke concert hall in Bremen and managed to beat seven other bands. One of the rewards was the contribution of a track to the Top-Hits compilation album released in April 1985. The band decided on "Jenny", which they recorded at Planet Wave Studio.

Not long after the Newcomer Show performance, Lemcke decided to depart, as the band's growing professional commitments clashed with his university studies. He was replaced by returning member Norbert Ziermann. With this lineup, Fex entered the newly built Hawkeye Studios in Ganderkesee to record the A-side of a six-track tape in November 1984 (Note: The B-side is composed of "Jenny" and two songs recorded in Heikendorf, which are "I Got My Eyes On You" and "Goldrush". These songs have been transferred from Jörg Lemcke's tape.). A newspaper report on this undertaking also mentioned their plans to release a vinyl record sometime in spring and tour Northern and Central Germany in March 1985. While a vinyl release did not materialize, the band obtained a contract with an agency; the latter obtained them a tour in various venues across Germany from March to May. The tour culminated in an appearance as the opening act of the Bruchhausen-Festival in Bruchhausen-Vilsen on May 26. Not long after the ending of it, Hädrich decided to relocate to Munich and left the band. Fex continued with a varying constellation of band members, most notably Dirk Reichardt as Hädrich's replacement and the return of Ilona Rückwardt as vocalist, but eventually disbanded in 1988.

In 1994, the Rückwardts formed a new band named Raindogs, which Volker Schenk joined as well.

=== Reunion and Skyscraper (2024–present) ===
FEX reunites for their performance on NDR, November 7, 2024.

On November 4, 2024, the song "Subways of Your Mind", also known as "The Most Mysterious Song on the Internet", was identified as being from Fex. On November 7, Rückwardt, Hädrich and Ziermann reunited to perform a live acoustic version of "Subways of Your Mind" on German radio station NDR 1 Welle Nord. This was the band's first performance since dissolving in 1988. On November 8, Sievers contacted NDR 1 for an interview after reading about the band's reunion in a local newspaper, and was subsequently put in contact with the other band members. The four musicians eventually got together recording sessions in a Hamburg studio on December, including a new version of "Subways of Your Mind".

Around this time, the band was contacted by different labels, before signing to the Berlin-based label The Outer Edge. On December 9, the label announce Fex's first release, a 7" vinyl of the 1985 tape version of "Subways of Your Mind" as a single, with "Heart in Danger" on the B-side, for a 20th December release in streaming, and a January 2025 release physically. On Christmas Day 2024, a tape containing the original NDR version of "Subways of Your Mind" was found by the band and made available on streaming platforms in January. Sievers announced shortly after that he would be leaving Fex due to personal and family commitments.

On May 16, 2025, The Outer Edge announced Fex's full-length debut album Skyscraper, which was released on July 8. The album contains remastered versions of all six songs from their six-track tape and three additional tracks, "Skyscraper", "Strange Feeling" and "Dirty Slapstick", also recovered from original 1980s recordings. The original 1984 recording of "Subways of Your Mind" from the cassette owned by Darius S., whose sister Lydia had initiated the search for the track, was also included as a bonus track. Darius also made the cover art for the album.

On January 23, 2026, a NDR report on television announced that FEX is working on a new album of original songs for the first time since 1988. The first single from their proposed album, "Alright", was released on July 17, 2026.

== Band members ==
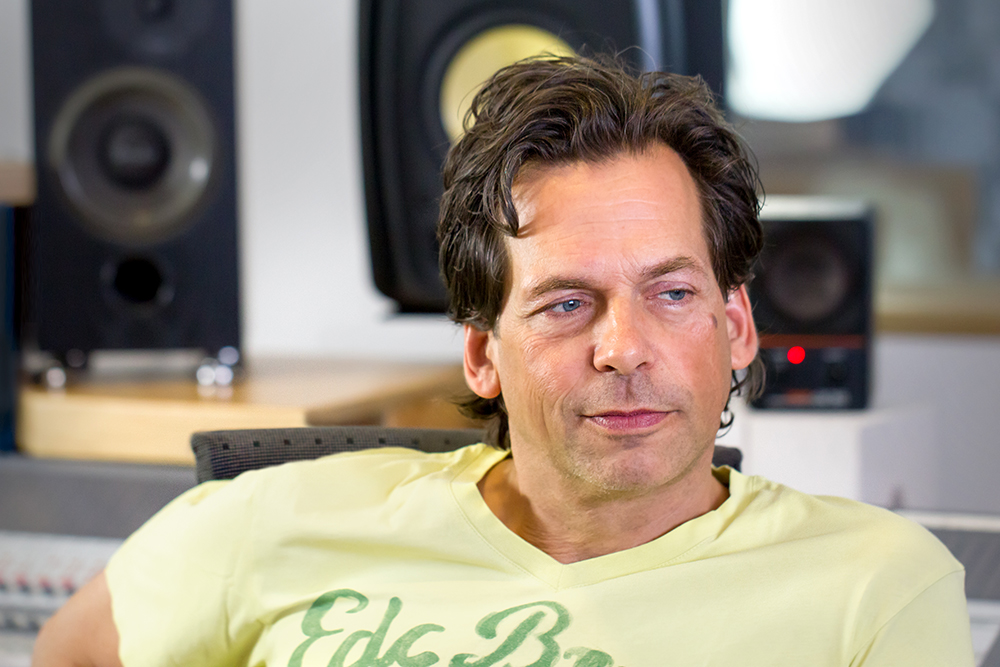
Composer Dirk Reichardt replaced Michael Hädrich as the band's keyboardist from 1985 until the band's dissolution.

Current members

- Michael Hädrich – keyboards, vocals, guitar (1981–1982; 1984–1985; 2024–present)
- Ture Rückwardt – composer, vocals, guitar (1980–1988; 2024–present)
- Norbert Ziermann – bass (1980–1982; 1984–1988; 2024–present)

Former members

- Hans-Reimer Sievers – drums (1982–1988; 2024–2025)
- Ilona Rückwardt – vocals (1980–1984; 1986–1988)
- Dirk Reichardt – keyboards (1985–1988)
- Jörg Lemcke – bass (1983–1984)
- Volker Schenk – bass (1982–1983)
- Hase - producer (1982-1985)
- Karl-Heinz "Kalle" Eckert – keyboards (1980–1983)
- Manfred Fox – drums (1980–1981)
- Heino R. – drums (1981–1982)

== Discography ==
=== Studio albums ===
Year	Title	Label
2025	Skyscraper: Waves from the Past	The Outer Edge

=== EPs ===
Year	Title	Notes
1982	Hygiene (Modulators)	Self-produced vinyl EP
1985	FEX	Self-produced cassette containing studio recordings sold at live shows
2025	More Waves from the Past	Limited-edition EP, bundled with the Skyscraper album

=== Live albums ===
Year	Title	Notes
2026	Don't Look Back	Album containing FEX performances from 2 concerts of 1985, at Uelzen and Roxi Paderborn

=== Singles ===
Year	Title	Notes
2024	Subways of Your Mind b/w Heart in Danger	
2024	Subways of Your Mind (live)	Recorded in May 1985 at the Roxi in Paderborn
2025	Subways of Your Mind (original version of TMMS)	Original version that aired on NDR
2025	Subways of Your Mind (TMMS version) b/w Talking Hands	
2025	Dead End b/w Sarah, Promise	All songs are sung by vocalists Ture and Ilona Rückwardt (Note: The label claims on the Bandcamp page and the vinyl cover that Ilona was a "featuring", implying she was present only for the songs on the single. However, Ilona was indeed a member of Fex, and participated in the songs as a member and not as a "featuring".)
2026	Alright	First song written and recorded after FEX's reunion
2026	You - Living In Your Fantasy	
2026	Wednesday	

=== Compilation appearances ===
Year	Title	Compilation name
1985	"Jenny" (Fex)	Zeus Top-Hits
2007	"Du Bist Anders" (Modulators)	Kein Kiel. Post-Punk & No Wave - Kieler Musikszene 1977-1982

=== Unreleased songs ===
- "Second Hand Love"
- "Killing Joke"
- "Epcot"
- "Talk About"
- "Don't Call Me Loser"
- "Bad Influence"
- "Cry In Your Eyes"
- "Metropolis"
- "Hollywood"
- "Honeymoon Sweetest"
- "Is That The Way You Look For Love?"
