= Lost media =

General term for inaccessible media

Theatrical release poster for the lost film London After Midnight; its last known copy was destroyed in the 1965 MGM vault fire

Lost media is any type of media thought to no longer exist in any format, or for which no copies can be located, partial or otherwise. The term primarily encompasses visual, audio, or audiovisual media, such as films, television, radio broadcasts, music, and video games.

Many television and radio broadcast masters, recorded onto magnetic tape, may be lost due to the industry practice of wiping. Motion picture studios also often destroyed their original nitrate film elements, as film and broadcast material was often considered ephemeral and of little historical worth after they had made their revenue. Some media considered lost may exist in studio or public archives, but may not be available to most people due to copyright or donor restriction rules, or for the most part, complete disinterest by anyone in an outdated program or subject matter. Due to the inherently unstable nature of any physical format, all naturally degrade over time, especially if not kept in correct storage conditions.

Preservation efforts attempt to avoid the loss of works; this is usually done by storing them in archives.

== Lost films ==
A large portion of silent films made in the United States are now considered lost. A 2013 report made by the United States Library of Congress estimates that 70 percent of silent films made in the United States have been completely lost.

== Lost television broadcasts ==
Most lost television broadcasts are early television programs which cannot be accounted for in studio archives or in personal archives. A majority of lost television broadcasts are lost due to deliberate destruction (such as a technique used in the early days of television called wiping) or neglect. The earliest television broadcasts were live broadcasts that were never recorded in any capacity to begin with due to a lack of recording equipment or interest at the time.

== Lost music ==
The Library of Congress estimates that a large portion of the earliest musical recordings, from the late 19th century to the early 20th century, have been lost. For example, only two percent of the over 3,000 wax cylinders produced by the North American Phonograph Company between 1889 and 1894 are part of the National Recording Preservation Board's sound recording library as of 2024.

A concept related to lost music is "lostwave", a term coined on the Internet for extant recordings of music for which little to no information about its authors or origin exists. Some examples of lostwave, such as "Subways of Your Mind" and "Ulterior Motives" (both of which were identified in 2024), have been the subjects of online crowdsourced research.

== Lost video games ==
Video games, including digital downloads, often fade from existence when digital game stores close, as demonstrated by the Wii Shop Channel, Xbox Live Arcade, V Cast Network, and the Nintendo eShop. P.T., a teaser to the unreleased Silent Hill game Silent Hills, became unable to be redownloaded after its removal from the PlayStation Network within a year. The Wii U and Nintendo 3DS digital download games Dodge Club Party and Dodge Club Pocket were removed from Nintendo eShop in 2019 and 2022; the games became publicly unavailable due to reasons beyond Nintendo's control.

According to the Video Game History Foundation, 87% of American video games released before 2010 are out of print and cannot be acquired outside of the grey market or piracy. Many of these titles are in danger of becoming lost or already are. Some video game enthusiasts argue that out of respect for both the original designers and the fans of the game, video game publishers have a duty to make sure that the game remains accessible. Video game preservationists, including both organizations such as the Video Game History Foundation and hobbyists, seek to preserve video game history that would have otherwise been lost to time due to a variety of factors, such as degrading storage mediums, digital game stores closing, or the game becoming unavailable because of licensing or financial issues. Their motivations include that the games hold cultural and historical value or can be educational material for the future.

== Lost electronic data ==
Data stored in electronic computers risks being lost if it is not frequently migrated into more recent file formats. This happens because as new computer systems are developed and new technologies are built, now obsolete systems may break down over time, leaving the data inside inaccessible. Electronic data preservation is further complicated by the fact that unless an emulator for a given computer system which can decode the data is present at the time of the preservation, the original data may become inaccessible as the original hardware breaks down, as it may depend on the original hardware to be decoded; in some cases, however, the original data may be recoverable through lengthy reverse engineering work with the objective of understanding the original computer system enough to decode the most original electronic data possible.

To mitigate the loss of their data, the Arctic World Archive has been the chosen location for the preservation of the code on public repositories on GitHub. The Arctic World Archive also stores a wide range of data of interest to multiple companies, institutions and governments; including the Constitutions of Brazil and Norway.

=== Lost internet media ===
Media released on the internet, such as file sharing, livestreams and blog posts, are especially vulnerable to loss. Media released solely to streaming services or other digital platforms without a physical release is sometimes withdrawn from further distribution; this leaves no means to obtain the media outside of piracy. The Electronic Frontier Foundation describes it as "a whole new kind of lost media [that is] only going to be preserved by those individuals who did the work to make and save copies of it, often risking draconian legal liability, regardless of how the studio feels about that work".

== See also ==
- Archival science – Science of storage, registration and preservation of historical data
- Data archaeology – Study of old data sources
- Data preservation – Conserving and maintaining safety and integrity of data
- Digital preservation – Practice to keep digital assets accessible in long term
- Digital hoarding – Excessive acquisition of digital material
- List of unpublished books
- Lost artworks
- Lost literary work
- Lost Media Wiki – Lost media database
- Lostwave – Music of unknown origin
- Media archaeology – Sub-discipline of archaeology
- Media preservation
- Orphan work – Copyright-protected work for which rightsholders are positively indeterminate
