= Eric Ambel discography =

- Studio albums: 3
- Live albums: 1
- Compilation albums: 2

Eric "Roscoe" Ambel is an American, New York City–based guitarist and record producer. His discography consists of three studio albums, one live album, and two compilations. In addition, he has been featured a performer and producer on many albums by other artists.

== Solo albums ==
=== Studio ===
- 1988: Roscoe's Gang (Enigma) reissued on Lakeside Lounge Records in 2004
- 1995: Loud & Lonesome (East Side Digital) reissued on Lakeside Lounge in 2004
- 2016: Lakeside (Lakeside Lounge)

=== Live ===
- 2017: Roscoe Live: Vol 1 (Lakeside Lounge)

== Compilations ==
- 2004: Knucklehead (Lakeside Lounge)
- 2022: You Asked for It: The Shut-In Singles Series (Lakeside Lounge)

== With The Yayhoos ==
- 1996: Fear Not the Obvious (Bloodshot)
- 2006: Put The Hammer Down (Lakeside Lounge)

== With the Del Lords ==
- 1984: Frontier Days (EMI America)
- 1986: Johnny Comes Marching Home (EMI America)
- 1988: Based on a True Story (Enigma)
- 1989: Howlin' at the Halloween Moon (Restless)
- 1990: Lovers Who Wander (Enigma)
- 2013: Elvis Club (Gb / MRI)

== With Steve Earle ==
- 2000: Live from Austin TX November 12, 2000 CD, DVD (New West) released 2006
- 2002: Jerusalem (E-Squared / Artemis)
- 2004: The Revolution Starts Now (E-Squared / Artemis)

== As producer ==
=== 1990 - 1995 ===
- 1992: Blood Oranges - Lone Green Valley EP (East Side Digital)
- 1992: Nils Lofgren - Crooked Line (Rykodisc)
- 1994: Blood Oranges - The Crying Tree (East Side Digital)
- 1994: Go To Blazes - Any Time ... Anywhere (East Side Digital)
- 1994: The Bottle Rockets - The Brooklyn Side (East Side Digital)
- 1995: Blue Mountain - Dog Days (Roadrunner)
- 1995: Cheri Knight - The Knitter (East Side Digital)
- 1995: Simon And The Bar Sinisters - Look At Me I'm Cool!!! (Upstart)
- 1995: The Cowslingers - That's Truckdrivin' (Sympathy For The Record Industry)
- 1995: Mojo Nixon - Whereabouts Unknown (Ripe & Ready)
- 1995: Mojo Nixon - "Girlfriend in a Coma" (Ripe & Ready)

=== 1996 - 1999 ===
- 1996: Go To Blazes - Waiting Around For The Crash (East Side Digital)
- 1996: Martin's Folly - Martin's Folly (Johnson's Wax)
- 1996: Mary Lee's Corvette - Mary Lee's Corvette (Ripe & Ready)
- 1997: The Bottle Rockets - 24 Hours A Day (Atlantic)
- 1997: Love Riot - Killing Time EP (Squirrel Boy)
- 1997: Simon Chardiet - Bug Bite Daddy (New Rounder / Upstart)
- 1998: The Blacks - Dolly Horrorshow (Bloodshot)
- 1999: The Backsliders - Southern Lines (Mammoth)
- 1999: Mary Lee's Corvette - True Lovers Of Adventure (Wild Pitch)
- 1999: The Bottle Rockets - Brand New Year (Doolittle / New West)

=== 2000 - 2009 ===
- 2000: Freedy Johnston - Live At 33 1/3 (Singing Magnet)
- 2001: Big In Iowa - Green Pop (Blue Rose)
- 2001: Demolition String Band - Pulling Up Atlantis (Okra-Tone)
- 2002: Mary Lee's Corvette - Blood On The Tracks (Bar/None)
- 2002: Miss Tammy Faye Starlite and the Angels Of Mercy - On My Knees (self-released)
- 2004: The Bottle Rockets - Leftovers (New West)
- 2006: Sugar Mountain - In the Raw (Brewery)
- 2007: Kasey Anderson - Reckoning (Terra Soul / Blue Rose)
- 2007: Spanking Charlene - Dismissed With a Kiss - (Slacker)
- 2009: The Bottle Rockets - Lean Forward (Bloodshot)
- 2009: Kasey Anderson - Nowhere Nights (Red River)

=== 2010 - 2017 ===
- 2010: Esquela - The Owl Has Landed (Bovina)
- 2011: Ben Hall - Ben Hall! (Tompkins Square)
- 2012: Jimbo Mathus and the Tri-State Coalition - White Buffalo (Fat Possum)
- 2013: Esquela - Are We Rolling? (Bovina)
- 2014: [Girls, Guns and Glory - Good Luck (Lonesome Day)
- 2015: The Bottle Rockets - South Broadway 0Athletic Club (Bloodshot)
- 2015: Jimbo Mathus - Blue Healer (Fat Possum)
- 2016: Esquela - Canis Majoris (Bovina)
- 2017: Jack Grace - Everything I Say Is A Lie (self-released)

=== 2018 - present ===
- 2018: Sarah Borges - Love's Middle Name (Blue Corn Music)
- 2021: Ward Hayden & the Outliers - Free Country (self-released)
- 2022: Sarah Borges - Together Alone (Blue Corn Music)
- 2023: Jerry Joseph - Baby, You're the Man Who Would Be King (Cosmo Sex School)
- 2025: Sarah Borges - "Mercy of the Moon" (single) (Lakeside Lounge)

== As primary artist/song contributor ==
- 1999: various artists - This Note's for You Too! A Tribute to Neil Young (Inbetweens Records) - track 2-3, "Revolution Blues"
- 2005: various artists - Lowe Profile: A Tribute To Nick Lowe (Brewery) - track 1-1, "12 Step Program (To Quit You Babe)"
- 2007: various artists - More Barn: A Tribute to Neil Young (Slothtrop) - track 17, "Cocaine Eyes" with the Roscoe Trio

== As composer ==
- 1995: Dan Zanes - Cool Down Time (Private Music) - track 2, "No Sky" (co-written with Dan Zanes and Mitchell Froom)
- 1999: Steve Wynn - My Midnight (Zero Hour) - track 1, "Nothing But The Shell" (co-written with Steve Wynn)
- 2011: Kasey Anderson and the Honkies - Heart Of A Dog (Red Parlor Records) - track 1, "The Wrong Light" (co-written with Kasey Anderson)
- 2016: The Bullhounds - To Rock & to Serve (Mighty / Rock Bastard / Traffic) - track 1, "Ain't Easy Being Cool" (co-written with James Marshall and Jeremy Tepper)

== Other appearances ==
- 1981: Joan Jett - Bad Reputation (Boardwalk) - guitar on "What Can I Do for You?" (2006 reissue)
- 1981: Joan Jett - I Love Rock 'n Roll (Boardwalk) guitar on "Crimson and Clover" and "Little Drummer Boy"
- 1989: Syd Straw - Surprise (Virgin) - guitar on "Think Too Hard"
- 1990: Mojo Nixon - Otis (Enigma) - guitar
- 1991: Joey Skidmore - Welcome To Humansville (MOP-TOP) - guitar
- 1994: Joey Skidmore - Joey Skidmore (DixieFrog)
- 1996: The Kennedys - Life Is Large (Green Linnet) - guitar on "Heart Of Darkness"
- 1996: The Bludgers - Better Off At Home (Hammerhead) - guitar on "Tomorrow In Australia"
- 2001: Run DMC - Crown Royal (Arista) - guitar on "Take The Money And Run"
- 2003: Marshall Crenshaw - What's In The Bag? (Razor & Tie) - Dulcitar, bass on "Take Me With U"
- 2005: Terry Anderson - Terry Anderson And The Olympic Ass-Kickin Team (Doublenaught) - guitar on "Purple GTO"
- 2006: Casey Neill - Brooklyn Bridge (In Music We Trust)
- 2006: Thea Gilmore - Harpo's Ghost (Sanctuary) - guitar, harmonium
- 2007: Keri Noble - Let Go (Seoul Records)
- 2007: Miss Ohio - Low (L'Oceanic) - keyboards
