= Get Tough: The Best of the Del-Lords =

Greatest hits album by The Del-Lords
- Released: June 29, 1999
- Genre: Roots rock, Rock and roll
- Length: 73:08
- Label: Restless

The Del-Lords chronology
| Lovers Who Wander (1990) | Get Tough: The Best of the Del-Lords (1999) | Under Construction (2010) |

Professional ratings
Review scores
| Source | Rating |
|---|---|
| AllMusic | 3.5/5 stars |
| Robert Christgau | A− |
| Tom Hull – on the Web | B+ |

Get Tough: The Best of the Del-Lords a greatest hits compilation by The Del-Lords, released in 1999 through Restless Records.

== Track listing ==
All songs written by Scott Kempner, except where noted.

| No. | Title | Writer(s) | Album | Length |
|---|---|---|---|---|
| 1. | "How Can a Poor Man Stand Such Times and Live?" | Alfred Reed | Frontier Days | 3:03 |
| 2. | "Get Tough" | | Frontier Days | 4:16 |
| 3. | "Livin' on Love" | | Frontier Days | 4:15 |
| 4. | "Burning in the Flame of Love" | | Frontier Days | 3:45 |
| 5. | "I Play the Drums" | | Frontier Days | 3:36 |
| 6. | "Heaven" | | Johnny Comes Marching Home | 2:58 |
| 7. | "St. Jake" | | Johnny Comes Marching Home | 5:25 |
| 8. | "Love Lies Dying" | | Johnny Comes Marching Home | 5:51 |
| 9. | "Everlovin'" | | Johnny Comes Marching Home | 5:41 |
| 10. | "Carry On" | Mac Rebennack/David Seth | previously unreleased | 2:11 |
| 11. | "Crawl in Bed" | | Based on a True Story | 3:57 |
| 12. | "Cheyenne" | | Based on a True Story | 3:45 |
| 13. | "Judas Kiss" | | Based on a True Story | 4:27 |
| 14. | "About You" | | Lovers Who Wander | 3:25 |
| 15. | "You and I" | | Lovers Who Wander | 4:29 |
| 16. | "Love on Fire" | | Lovers Who Wander | 3:46 |
| 17. | "Hand to Mouth" | | previously unreleased | 3:32 |
| 18. | "Folsom Prison Blues" | Johnny Cash | previously unreleased | 4:46 |

== Personnel ==
The Del-Lords

- Scott Kempner – lead vocals, guitar
- Eric Ambel – guitar, vocals
- Manny Caiati – bass guitar, vocals
- Frank Funaro – drums, vocals

Additional CD credits

- Pat Benatar – background vocals
- Snooky & Tish Bellamo – background vocals
- Lenny Castro – percussion
- Saul Davis – compilation director
- Neil Giraldo – producer
- Charlie Giordano – keyboards
- Frank Linx – background vocals
- Thom Panunzio – producer
- Lou Whitney – producer
