= Roscoe's Gang =

Studio album by Eric Ambel
- Released: 1988
- Recorded: 1988
- Studio: Column One, Springfield, Missouri
- Genre: Rock, country rock
- Label: Enigma
- Producer: Lou Whitney, Eric Ambel

Eric Ambel chronology
Roscoe's Gang (1988)	Loud & Lonesome (1995)

Roscoe's Gang is the debut album by the American musician Eric Ambel, released in 1988. Its title is a reference to the band Ambel would use for casual New York City bar gigs. He supported the album with a North American tour.

== Production ==
The album was recorded at Column One in Springfield, Missouri, with members of the Morells, and coproduced by the band's bass player, Lou Whitney. The cover of Neil Young's "Vampire Blues" was recorded in one take. "Total Destruction to Your Mind" is a cover of the Swamp Dogg song. "If You Gotta Go, Go Now" was written by Bob Dylan. "Loose Talk" is a version of the song made famous by Buck and Bonnie Owens. "Don't Wanna Be Your Friend" and "I Waited for You" were written by Ambel's Del-Lords bandmate Scott Kempner. "Next to the Last Waltz" was cowritten by Peter Holsapple. "Power Lounger Theme" is an instrumental. Syd Straw and Skid Roper contributed to the recording sessions.

== Critical reception ==
Professional ratings
Review scores
Source	Rating
All Music Guide to Rock	4/5 stars
Chicago Tribune	2.5/4 stars
The Encyclopedia of Popular Music	3/5 stars
The Great Alternative & Indie Discography	5/10
Houston Chronicle	4/5 stars
MusicHound Rock: The Essential Album Guide	3.5/5 stars
New York Daily News	3/4 stars
The Ottawa Citizen	2/3 stars
The Philadelphia Inquirer	4/4 stars
SouthtownStar	3/5 stars

Newsday said that Roscoe's Gang is "what a solo album should be: an off-hand, unaffected, underproduced busman's holiday." The Chicago Tribune opined that "Ambel's true talents still seem to lie in rock 'n' roll territory, the best songs here being some strutting, full-power rockers." The New York Times praised the "cheerfully rowdy material". The Calgary Herald labeled the music "raunchy rock and gritty country-rock". The Morning Call concluded that Ambel "does [rock] better than Jason & the Scorchers or the Georgia Satellites".

The Ottawa Citizen noted that unlike Ambel's work with the Del-Lords and the Blackhearts, the music is "less contrived and exudes pure intentions." The Philadelphia Inquirer stated that "this is wonderfully raw, passionate music that never loses its sense of humor." The Boston Globe admired the "inspired primitivism" and "loose and unencumbered" performances. The SouthtownStar likened the music to "the Rolling Stones meet the dB's". Playboy noted that "Ambel's guitar expertise ranges from country to hard rock to pop metal".

== Track listing ==
No.	Title	Length
1.	"If You Gotta Go, Go Now"
2.	"Total Destruction to Your Mind"
3.	"The Girl That I Ain't Got"
4.	"Forever Came Today"
5.	"30 Days in the Workhouse"
6.	"Power Lounger Theme"
7.	"Don't Wanna Be Your Friend"
8.	"I Waited for You"
9.	"Next to the Last Waltz"
10.	"Loose Talk"
11.	"You Must Have Me Confused"
12.	"Vampire Blues"
13.	"Power Lounger Theme Part 2" (Guitar)
