= Frontier Days =

Frontier Days may refer to:

- Frontier Days (rodeo), a rodeo event held by multiple cities
- Frontier Days (album), an album released in 1984 by Del-Lords
- Cheyenne Frontier Days, an annual 10-day-long outdoor rodeo and festival in Cheyenne, Wyoming
- Frontier Days (film), a 1934 film starring Bill Cody
