= Everybody Lay Down =

1993 single by Pat Benatar

Single by Pat Benatar

from the album Gravity's Rainbow
- Released: July 21, 1993
- Studio: Spyder Mae's Soul Kitchen (Los Angeles, CA)
- Length: 4:25 (album version); 3:57 (single version)
- Label: Chrysalis
- Songwriters: Neil Giraldo; Pat Benatar
- Producers: Don Gehman; Neil Giraldo

Pat Benatar singles chronology
"So Long" (1991)	"Everybody Lay Down" (1993)	"Somebody's Baby" (1993)

"Everybody Lay Down" is a song by American singer Pat Benatar, released in 1993 as the lead single from her ninth studio album, Gravity's Rainbow. The song was written by Neil Giraldo and Benatar, and produced by Don Gehman and Giraldo. "Everybody Lay Down" reached No. 3 on the Billboard Album Rock Tracks chart in June 1993.

== Background ==
Speaking of the song's lyrical message, Benatar told the Southtown Star in 1993, "'Everybody Lay Down' is really about complacency. You see it, you don't do anything about it, but you whine. That's the thing I hate. Put up or shut up. You know, nobody will vote, but then they'll sit there for five hours at the dinner table complaining about the person that they were too lazy to go and not vote for. So that's what it's about. It's like talk shows. Everybody is so ready to just get on there and spill their guts and I'm like, who's interested?"

== Release ==
In the US, "Everybody Lay Down" was released as a radio single from Gravity's Rainbow on April 26, 1993. It reached No. 3 on the Billboard Album Rock Tracks chart. The senior director of album promotion for Chrysalis/EMI, Neil Lasher, told Billboard in 1993, "When I started traveling around the country talking about Pat, I was told that some of her older stuff wasn't being played anymore, and that the blues album [True Love] was not relevant. Then I started playing people 'Everybody Lay Down' and they literally wanted to grab the tape from me."

== Critical reception ==
Upon its release as a single, Larry Flick of Billboard described "Everybody Lay Down" as a "catchy throwdown that takes Benatar back to the days of now-classic hits like 'Promises in the Dark'". He added, "The difference is a more worldly vocal delivery and a lyric depth that is the true meat of this track." In light of the song's strong airplay, he considered it would be "wise" of Chrysalis to give the single a full, commercial release.

In a review of Gravity's Rainbow, Andrea Odintz of Rolling Stone described the song as a "rhythmic anthem" and the "type of melodic hard rock that remains Benatar's winning formula". Odintz added, "In fact, it's so catchy that the irony of the lyrics may be lost." Gerry Krochak of the Regina Leader-Post felt the song "shows that she hasn't lost one ounce of the powerful, throaty vocals that made a copycat out of Alannah Myles". He added, "It's a well structured number, with a funky bass line and solid chorus that complement Benatar's obvious vocal assets." Chuck Campbell of the Scripps Howard News Service wrote, "Benatar refamiliarizes her audience with her vocal prowess on the choruses of 'Everybody Lay Down,' an invective against apathy."

== Track listing ==
7–inch single (Jukebox release)

1. "Everybody Lay Down" – 4:25
2. "Promises in the Dark" (Live) – 5:11

CD single (US promo)

1. "Everybody Lay Down" (Edit Version) – 3:57
2. "Everybody Lay Down" (Album Version) – 4:25

CD single (Japanese release)

1. "Everybody Lay Down" (Edit Version) – 3:57
2. "Everybody Lay Down" (Album Version) – 4:25

== Personnel ==
Everybody Lay Down

- Pat Benatar – vocals
- Neil Giraldo – guitar
- Frank Linx – bass
- Myron Grombacher – drums, percussion

Production

- Don Gehman – producer, engineer
- Neil Giraldo – producer
- Rick Will – engineer
- Ed Thacker – mixing
- Danny Alonso – assistant mixer

== Charts ==
Chart (1993)	Peak position
Canada Top Singles (RPM)	50
US Mainstream Rock (Billboard)	3
