= Tenement Angels =

Studio album by Scott Kempner
- Released: 1992
- Studios: Column One, Springfield, Missouri
- Genres: Rock, roots rock
- Label: Razor & Tie
- Producers: Lou Whitney, Manny Caiati, Scott Kempner

Scott Kempner chronology
Tenement Angels (1992)	Saving Grace (2008)

Tenement Angels is an album by the American musician Scott Kempner, released in 1992. Kempner supported the album by touring with Jason & the Scorchers.

== Production ==
Recorded in Missouri, the album was produced by Lou Whitney, Manny Caiati, and Scott Kempner. Kempner was backed by the Skeletons, a roots rock band; Caiati, Kempner's bandmate in the Del-Lords, contributed bass parts. The album contains a cover of "(Just Like) Romeo and Juliet", by the Reflections.

== Critical reception ==
Professional ratings
Review scores
Source	Rating
AllMusic	4.5/5 stars
Chicago Sun-Times	3/4 stars
Houston Chronicle	4/4 stars
MusicHound Rock: The Essential Album Guide	3.5/5 stars
Rocky Mountain News	A
The State	4/5 stars

The Washington Post thought that, "like Chuck Berry's, Kempner's lyrics seem at first glance to concern nothing more complicated than cars, girls and street corners, but like Berry's, Kempner's songs are full of sly humor and satiric commentary." Trouser Press wrote that, "consistent with his work in the Del-Lords, the album has an easygoing urban roots-rock sound—'60s AM radio given a heartland kick, a taste of country and a little musical poetry." The St. Louis Post-Dispatch praised "the outstanding drumming of Bobby Lloyd Hicks, who has rarely been given so many chances to power a band in the way that he and only a few others can do."

Stereo Review determined that "Kempner gets a crateload of rapport and expertise from the Skeletons ... enabling him to come up with a modest rock-and-roll classic... The emphasis is on 'modest', as Kempner achieves the companionable naturalism that eludes Springsteen, Seger, and all the other well-intended overreachers." The Chicago Tribune concluded that "Kempner heads deeper into back-to-basics rock territory, uses the trip for some personal exploration as well and, when you fear things might get a bit too heavy, tosses in some great old throw-away pop." The State described Tenement Angels as "Fender guitars, Vibralux amps, biker boots and a pounding back beat." The Rocky Mountain News opined that "the musical/lyrical inspirations range from Booker T. and the MG's and the Beach Boys to AC/DC and Allen Ginsberg... It all works effortlessly."

MusicHound Rock: The Essential Album Guide deemed the album "bar-band magic."

== Track listing ==
All tracks are written by Scott Kempner, except where noted.

No.	Title	Writer(s)	Length
1.	"You Move Me"		4:29
2.	"Bad Intent"		2:50
3.	"I.C.U."		4:26
4.	"Hot Rod Angel"		3:15
5.	"Love Among the Ruins"		3:20
6.	"Lonesome Train"		3:45
7.	"Precious Thing"		3:36
8.	"Livin' with Her, Livin' with Me"		3:09
9.	"Do You Believe in Me?"	Kempner, David Roter	4:00
10.	"(Just Like) Romeo and Juliet"	Bob Hamilton, Freddie Gorman	2:29
11.	"Tender Mercies"		5:22
12.	"I Wanna Be Yours"		3:54

== Personnel ==
The Skeletons

- D. Clinton Thompson, Scott Kempner – guitar, vocals
- Lou Whitney – bass, vocals
- Joe Terry, Kelly Brown – keyboards, vocals
- Bobby Lloyd Hicks – drums, percussion, vocals

with:

- Jim Wunderle – backing vocals
- Manny Caiati – bass on "I.C.U.", "Lonesome Train", "Do You Believe in Me?" and "I Wanna Be Yours"
