= Lovers Who Wander (The Del-Lords album) =

Studio album by the Del-Lords
- Released: 1990
- Genre: Rock, roots rock
- Length: 54:08
- Label: Enigma
- Producer: Manny Caiati, Thom Panunzio

The Del-Lords chronology
Howlin' at the Halloween Moon (1989)	Lovers Who Wander (1990)	Get Tough: The Best of the Del-Lords (1999)

Lovers Who Wander is the fourth studio album by the Del-Lords, released in 1990 through Enigma Records. The band supported the album with a North American tour. The album title comes from a Dion song.

== Critical reception ==
Professional ratings
Review scores
Source	Rating
AllMusic	3.5/5 stars
Robert Christgau	(dud)

The Washington Post wrote that "this band has been moving toward a traditional early-'60s New York rock sound: Springsteen territory, though the Lords aren't quite so overweening as the Boss." The Dallas Morning News determined that "the band displays its seemingly unerring knack for melding melodies that are as lasting as they are immediate with lyrics that act more as stories being told than merely words that sound good strung together." The Palm Beach Post concluded that "singer-guitarist Scott Kempner's thoughtful songs about the exhilaration and disappointment of love and romance deserve a hearing."

== Track listing ==
All songs written by Scott Kempner, except "Learn to Let Go" co-written by David Roter and "Stay with Me" co-written by Andy Shernoff.

No.	Title	Length
1.	"Touch One Heart"	4:25
2.	"You and I"	4:30
3.	"I Need Love"	4:02
4.	"Love on Fire"	3:50
5.	"About You"	3:25
6.	"Learn to Let Go"	4:25
7.	"I Stand in Your Light"	4:27
8.	"Kiss Away"	3:53
9.	"Hellbent"	5:01
10.	"Rockabye"	4:00
11.	"Stay with Me"	4:10
12.	"The Wild Boys"	3:55
13.	"A Lifetime of Trouble"	4:05

== Personnel ==
The Del-Lords

- Scott Kempner – lead vocals, guitar, twelve-string guitar, illustration
- Eric Ambel – guitar, twelve-string guitar, acoustic guitar, Rickenbacker, vocals
- Manny Caiati – bass guitar, Rhodes piano, vocals, production, mixing
- Frank Funaro – drums, vocals

Additional personnel

- Steve Aiken – illustration
- Frank Caiati – vocal harmony
- Charlie Giordano – keyboards
- Jim Goatley – engineering
- Mark Harder – engineering
- Jerry – tambourine
- Kenny Laguna – tambourine
- Kenny Margolis – keyboards, organ, Hammond organ, piano
- Manny Margolis – Hammond organ
- Mike Meehan – assistant engineering
- N.J. Nightingales – guitar
- Thom Panunzio – production, mixing, tambourine
- Jeannine Pinkerton – photography
- Gray Russell – engineering, tambourine, vocals
- Jenine Saccente – illustration, design
- Snookie – additional vocals
- Robert Spencer – illustration, art direction, photography, design, photography
- Lisa Sutton – design, typography
- Tish – additional vocals
- Lou Whitney – associate producer, engineer
- Jim Wunderle – vocals
