= Boxcar Satan =

Post-industrial blues band

- Origin: San Antonio, Texas, United States
- Genres: Post-punk, industrial rock
- Years active: 1990–present
- Labels: Compulsive Records, DogFingers Recordings
- Members: Sanford Allen; Patrick Sane; Aaron Seibert
- Website: www.boxcarsatan.com

Boxcar Satan is a three-piece post-industrial blues band from San Antonio, Texas.

Formed in 1990 by guitarist and vocalist Sanford Allen and bassist Patrick Sane; at the time, both were members of the band Evil Mothers. The band has churned out a substantial catalog of releases that have received critical praise from home and abroad. The angular, genre-jumping disks have drawn comparisons to Pere Ubu, Howlin’ Wolf, The Birthday Party, Muddy Waters, Captain Beefheart, Eric Dolphy and The Fall, among others. Sane has also played with Pigface, Genesis P-Orridge, Reverend Vince Anderson & s.p.a.s.m.

The band has changed personnel numerous times, frequently shuffling drummers. Its current percussionist is Aaron Seibert, previously of the bands Gorch Fock and the Snails.

In addition to his work with Boxcar Satan, Allen is a published author of horror and dark fantasy short stories and prose poems.

== Discography ==
Boxcar Satan's first full-length studio recording, Days Before the Flood was released in July 1999 on Compulsive Records. It was recorded at Tribal Studios in San Antonio, Texas by Chad Garrett and Bobdog Catlin and featured cover art by James Cobb.

The follow-up, Crooked Mile March was released in October 2001 on DogFingers Recordings. Again recorded at Tribal Studios in San Antonio, Texas by Chad Garrett and Bobdog Catlin with cover art by James Cobb.

October 2003 saw the release of Boxcar Satan's third long player Upstanding and Indigent, again for DogFingers, expanding its already diverse sonic palette by ornamenting its noisy, post-punk take on pre-war blues with touches of Cajun music, gospel and even tasteful prog rock. Honing their songs with a newfound melodicism and complexity, the Boxcars spin tales of train-wreck lives, bandit queen Phoolan Devi and carnival freakshow stars. And their take on the Depression-era song "How Can a Poor Man Stand Such Times and Live?" seems all too appropriate in the current political environment. Recorded after the addition of former Worm, 1.0 and Shit City Dreamgirls drummer Ken Robinson, at Tribal Studios in San Antonio, Texas by Chad Garrett. Cover art by James Cobb.

In April 2006 Boxcar Satan released their first DVD collecting videos for seven of their songs by Texas filmmaker Brant Bumpers along with a 10-song live concert.

No One at the Wheel features videos for the songs Calamity Jones, Slow Learner, Traveling Man, Best Be Gone, Ghost of a Chance, Pig in a Dress, and Silent and Automatic. It also includes Boxcar Satan's full performance at the San Antonio Contemporary Art Month's 2004 CAM Carnival. It was released on DogFingers Recordings with cover art by James Cobb.

In 2007, Boxcar Satan collaborated with "folk-punk troubadour" Ghostwriter on the full-length CD Hobo Nouveau. The release features songs written both by Ghostwriter and Boxcar Satan in addition to a handful of folk and country covers. It has a more raw feel than previous disks since it was rehearsed and recorded over a four-day period.

The band recorded and released another studio CD, Trouble All Its Own, in 2009. The 15-track disk is more of a return to the band's stylistic roots, pairing up raw, swampy blues with abrasive no-wave elements. It includes a cover of Blue Öyster Cult's "Dominance and Submission", which the band often played at live performances.

== Touring and shows ==
Boxcar Satan has toured the United States numerous times, playing everywhere from smoky dive bars and bingo halls to highbrow art galleries and San Francisco's Church of Satan. They were staples of the seminal San Antonio rock and punk bar Taco Land before the murder of owner Ram Ayala.

== Reviews ==
The Austin Chronicle called Boxcar Satan's 2004 Album Upstanding & Indigent one of the 10 best Texas releases. The band was also the San Antonio Current's critic's pick for best punk band in the 2004 "Best of San Antonio" issue and they tied for top Blues band in the 2003 issue. Boxcar Satan has even been mentioned on National Public Radio's Day to Day in an article about gig posters.
