= Blackgrass: From West Virginia to 125th St =

Studio album by Swamp Dogg
- Released: May 31, 2024
- Length: 41:33
- Label: Oh Boy
- Producer: Ryan Olson

Swamp Dogg chronology
I Need a Job...So I Can Buy More Auto-Tune (2022)	Blackgrass: From West Virginia to 125th St (2024)	Swamp Dogg Contemplates the Afterlife (2026)

Blackgrass: From West Virginia to 125th St is a studio album by American singer and record producer Swamp Dogg. It was released on May 31, 2024, via Oh Boy Records. Produced by Ryan Olson, it features guest appearances from Jenny Lewis, Margo Price and Vernon Reid. The album debuted at number 2 on the Billboard Bluegrass Albums chart in the United States.

== Critical reception ==
Professional ratings
Aggregate scores
Source	Rating
Metacritic	85/100
Review scores
Source	Rating
AllMusic	4/5 stars
Robert Christgau	A−
Tom Hull	B+
PopMatters	9/10
Spectrum Culture	75/100%

Blackgrass: From West Virginia to 125th St was met with generally favorable reviews from music critics. At Metacritic, which assigns a normalized rating out of 100 to reviews from mainstream publications, the album received an average score of 85 based on five reviews.

Avery Gregurich of PopMatters called the album "a timeless collection of American music that could only be created and delivered by the 81-year-old self-proclaimed 'original D-O-double G'". Robert Christgau praised the album, stating: "on John Prine's label, with Margo Price, Jenny Lewis, and closet bluegrass adept/adaptor Vernon Reid contributing cameos, he revs up the songwriting. The Price feature "To The Other Woman" is a special standout, with "Your Best Friend" a made-to-order B side. And the racial charge of the "Murder Ballad" closer is more than a little eerie". AllMusic's Mark Deming noted: "Blackgrass shows he can make a memorable bluegrass album as easily as he can craft a potent soul groove. The surroundings are unexpected, the quality is not". Tom Hull resumed: "while he's always had a fair bit of country in him, he waited until he turned 80 to indulge it here".

== Track listing ==
No.	Title	Writer(s)	Length
1.	"Mess Under That Dress"	Jerry Williams Jr.	2:38
2.	"Ugly Mans Wife"	Williams Jr.	2:55
3.	"Curtains on the Window"	Williams Jr.; Wayne Stegall; Dwayne Stegall	2:30
4.	"Have a Good Time"	Boudleaux Bryant; Felice Bryant	3:50
5.	"To the Other Woman" (featuring Margo Price)	Williams Jr.; Gary Bonds	3:54
6.	"Songs to Sing"	Williams Jr.	4:25
7.	"Count the Days" (featuring Jenny Lewis)	Yvonne Williams; Brooks O'Dell	2:43
8.	"Gotta Have My Baby Back"	Floyd Tillman	3:54
9.	"Your Best Friend"	Williams Jr.; Larry Harrison	2:33
10.	"This Is My Dream"	Williams Jr.	2:44
11.	"Rise Up" (featuring Vernon Reid)	Williams Jr.	3:25
12.	"Murder Ballad"	Williams Jr.	6:02
Total length:			41:33

== Personnel ==
- Jerry "Swamp Dogg" Williams Jr. – vocals, producer
- Christopher Alan "Chris" Scruggs – backing vocals (tracks: 1, 7), bass, percussion (track 7), lap steel guitar (track 8)
- Harry Stinson – backing vocals (tracks: 1, 7)
- Rory Hoffman – backing vocals (tracks: 1, 7), banjo & 12-string mandolin (track 6), mandolin & accordion (track 8), whistle (tracks: 8, 12), cello banjo (track 12)
- The Cactus Blossoms – backing vocals (track 2)
- Blake Morgan – backing vocals (tracks: 4, 8)
- Margo Rae Price – vocals (track 5)
- Channy Leaneagh – backing vocals (track 5)
- Lauren Alford – backing vocals (track 5)
- Madison Hallman – backing vocals (track 5)
- Jennifer Diane Lewis – vocals (track 7)
- Sid Sriram – backing vocals (track 7)
- Justin Vernon – backing vocals (track 9)
- Kenneth W. Vaughan – guitar (tracks: 1–5, 7, 9, 10), acoustic guitar (tracks: 8, 11)
- Noam Pikelny – banjo (tracks: 1–5, 7, 9–11)
- Billy Contreras – fiddle
- Sierra Hull – mandolin (tracks: 1–5, 7, 9, 10)
- Jerry Douglas – dobro (tracks: 2–5, 9)
- Tim Fain – violin (track 6)
- Alistair Sung – cello (track 6)
- Carmen Jonathan Camerieri – french horn (track 6)
- Larry "MoogStar" Clemon – keyboards (track 10)
- Vernon Reid – electric guitar (track 11)
- Ryan Olson – producer
- Alex Nutter – additional producer (track 12)
- Mark Nevers – engineering
- Zack Pancoast – engineering assistant
- David McMurry – photography

== Charts ==
=== Weekly charts ===
Chart (2024)	Peak position
US Bluegrass Albums (Billboard)	2

=== Year-end charts ===
Chart (2024)	Position
US Bluegrass Albums (Billboard)	15
