= Love, Loss, and Auto-Tune =

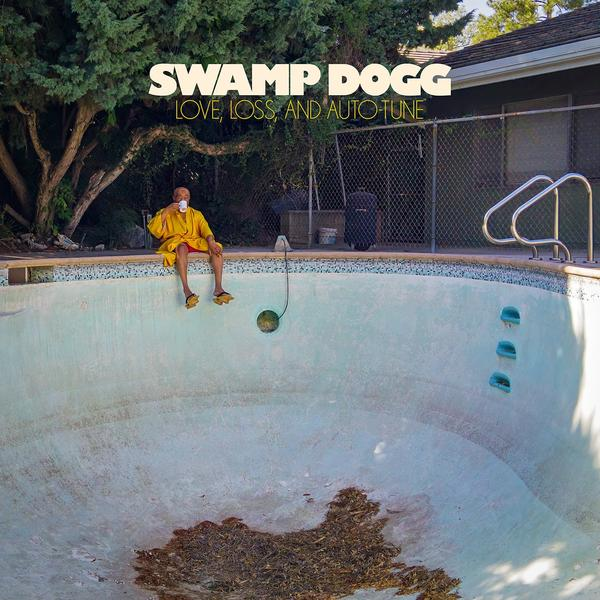

Studio album by Swamp Dogg
- Released: September 7, 2018
- Genre: Rhythm and blues; soul
- Length: 35:56
- Label: Joyful Noise
- Producer: MoogStar; Andrew Broder; Taskforce; Psymun; Sen 09; Trever Hagen

Swamp Dogg chronology
The White Man Made Me Do It (2014)	Love, Loss, and Auto-Tune (2018)	Sorry You Couldn't Make It (2020)

Love, Loss, and Auto-Tune is a studio album by Swamp Dogg. It was released via Joyful Noise Recordings on September 7, 2018. It peaked at number 7 on the Billboard Heatseekers Albums chart, as well as number 28 on the Independent Albums chart.

== Production ==
The album was inspired by Kanye West's 808s & Heartbreak. After Swamp Dogg and MoogStar recorded a rough version of the album, Ryan Olson and Justin Vernon spent several years "refining, fine-tuning, and deconstructing" these recordings. The album includes the cover versions of "Answer Me, My Love" and "Star Dust". In a 2018 interview with Los Angeles Times, Swamp Dogg said, "It's the best thing I've done since the '70s."

== Music videos ==
Music videos were created for "I'll Pretend", "Lonely", "Sex with Your Ex", and "Star Dust".

== Critical reception ==
Professional ratings
Aggregate scores
Source	Rating
Metacritic	74/100
Review scores
Source	Rating
AllMusic	3.5/5 stars
Pitchfork	7.3/10
PopMatters	8/10 stars
Rolling Stone	3.5/5 stars

At Metacritic, which assigns a weighted average score out of 100 to reviews from mainstream critics, the album received an average score of 74, based on 8 reviews, indicating "generally favorable reviews".

Mark Deming of AllMusic wrote, "with Love, Loss, and Auto-Tune, Swamp Dogg takes a very deep dive into the electronic side of contemporary pop, hip-hop, and R&B, and he predictably pushes it to the wall." Elias Leight of Rolling Stone wrote, "On Love, Loss, and Auto-Tune's best songs, [Ryan] Olson's synth-heavy backdrops evoke the late Eighties, landing somewhere between early Chicago house music and twitchy hip-hop." Jon Pareles of The New York Times commented that "Swamp Dogg sets off into a bizarre, unsettled realm of computer-manipulated vocals and surreal, anything-can-happen electronic backdrops." Stephen M. Deusner of Pitchfork wrote, "The experiment succeeds because Swamp Dogg delivers on all three aspects of his album title: the ecstasies of love, the misery of loss, and the way Auto-Tune can be used to magnify those feelings."

Mojo placed it at number 56 on the "Top 75 Albums of 2018" list.

== Track listing ==
No.	Title	Writer(s)	Producer(s)	Length
1.	"Answer Me, My Love"	Fred Rauch; Carl Sigman; Gerhard Winkler	MoogStar; Andrew Broder; Taskforce	2:53
2.	"Lonely"	Jerry Williams Jr.; Larry Clemon; Bob Jones	MoogStar	2:38
3.	"I'll Pretend" (featuring Guitar Shorty and Justin Vernon)	Jerry Williams Jr.; Larry Clemon; Delayne Stegall; Wayne H. Stegall	MoogStar	4:24
4.	"I'm Coming with Lovin' on My Mind"	Jerry Williams Jr.	MoogStar; Psymun; Sen 09	4:05
5.	"$$$ Huntin'"	Jerry Williams Jr.; Larry Clemon; Bob Jones	MoogStar; Psymun; Andrew Broder	5:30
6.	"I Love Me More"	Jerry Williams Jr.; Larry Clemon; Bob Jones	MoogStar	4:31
7.	"Sex with Your Ex"	Jerry Williams Jr.; Larry Clemon; Bob Jones; Beverly Green	MoogStar; Andrew Broder; Trever Hagen	4:31
8.	"She's All Mind All Mind"	Jerry Williams Jr.; Larry Clemon	MoogStar; Taskforce	4:32
9.	"Star Dust"	Hoagy Carmichael; Mitchell Parish	MoogStar	3:48
Total length:				35:56

== Personnel ==
Credits adapted from liner notes.

- Swamp Dogg – vocals, keyboards (1)
- MoogStar – production, vocals (1)
- Andrew Broder – production (1, 5, 7)
- Justin Vernon – messina (1–8), vocals (3), keyboards (4)
- Romain Bly – French horn (1, 7), arrangement (1, 7, 9)
- Alistair Sung – cello (1, 7, 9)
- Thora Margret Sveinsdottir – viola (1, 7, 9)
- Shelley Soerensen – violin (1, 7)
- Marlies van Gangelen – oboe (1, 7)
- Maaike van der Linde – flute (1, 7)
- Taskforce – production (1, 8)
- Amire Johnson – keyboards (1)
- Brian Nichols – keyboards (2, 5, 6)
- Erik Andersen – keyboards (2, 5)
- Lazerbeak – boom bap (2, 5)
- Jake Hanson – guitar (2, 6)
- Charles Hayes – saxophone (2, 8)
- Chris Bierden – bass guitar (2, 9)
- Ryan Olson – keyboard bass (3), bass guitar (6), piano (9)
- Bobby Raps – snare (3), handclap (7)
- Guitar Shorty – guitar (3), headphone bleed (3)
- Seth Rosetter – deep noise (3)
- Psymun – production (4, 5)
- Sen 09 – production (4)
- Elliot Kozel – keyboards (4)
- Morgan Whirledge – keyboards (4)
- Isaac Gale – bass guitar (4)
- V*agra – shaker (4)
- Chris Eagan – drums (5)
- Josh Berg – beat (6)
- Trever Hagen – production (7)
- Jeremy Ylvisaker – guitar (7)
- Decarlo Jackson – bass guitar (7)
- Mark McGee – shaker (7)
- Drew Christopherson – hi-hat (9)
- Andre de Ridder – violin (9)
- Mayah Kadish – violin (9)
- David McMurry – photography
- Erik Madigan Heck – photography
- David J. Woodruff – layout

== Chart history ==
Chart (2018)	Peak position
US Heatseekers Albums (Billboard)	7
US Independent Albums (Billboard)	28
