= I Need a Job...So I Can Buy More Auto-Tune =

Studio album by Swamp Dogg
- Released: February 25, 2022
- Genre: Rhythm and blues; soul
- Length: 43:48
- Label: Don Giovanni
- Producer: MoogStar; Norman Whitfield, Jr.; Swamp Dogg

Swamp Dogg chronology
Sorry You Couldn't Make It (2020)	I Need a Job...So I Can Buy More Auto-Tune (2022)	Blackgrass: From West Virginia to 125th St (2024)

Professional ratings
Review scores
Source	Rating
Mojo	3/5 stars
Pitchfork	6.2/10
Record Collector	2/5 stars
Spectrum Culture	70%
Uncut	7/10

I Need a Job...So I Can Buy More Auto-Tune is a studio album by American musician and producer Swamp Dogg. It was released on February 25, 2022, via Don Giovanni Records. The album was recorded by Swamp Dogg and Moogstar in Los Angeles, and features contributions from Guitar Shorty and Willie Clayton.

== Track listing ==
No.	Title	Writer(s)	Length
1.	"I Need a Job"	Jerry Williams Jr.	4:48
2.	"Cheating in the Daylight" (featuring Willie Clayton)	Williams Jr.; Bob Jones	5:28
3.	"Soul to Blessed Soul"	Williams Jr.	5:36
4.	"She Got That Fire"	Williams Jr.; Larry Clemon	5:32
5.	"I Need Your Body"	Williams Jr.	4:57
6.	"Darlin' Darlin' Darlin'"	Williams Jr.; Clemon	4:07
7.	"Full-Time Woman"	Williams Jr.; Beverly Green	4:33
8.	"Cheating All Over Again"	Williams Jr.; Jones	4:20
9.	"Show Me"	Joseph Arrington Jr.	4:30
Total length:			43:48

== Personnel ==
- Jerry "Swamp Dogg" Williams Jr. – vocals, producer
- Willie Clayton – vocals
- Larry "MoogStar" Clemon – producer
- Norman Whitfield, Jr. – producer
- Guitar Shorty- guitar
- Crazy Tomes- guitar
- Lao Delozada – mixing
- Ben Clark – design
- Matt Dilmore – photography
- Ian Dillon – lacquer cut
