= Sorry You Couldn't Make It =

Studio album by Swamp Dogg
- Released: March 6, 2020
- Recorded: 2019–2020
- Studios: Sound Emporium (Nashville, Tennessee)
- Genres: Country; rhythm and blues; soul
- Length: 38:06
- Labels: Joyful Noise; Pioneer Works Press
- Producer: Ryan Olson

Swamp Dogg chronology
Love, Loss, and Auto-Tune (2018)	Sorry You Couldn't Make It (2020)	I Need a Job...So I Can Buy More Auto-Tune (2022)

Sorry You Couldn't Make It is a studio album by American musician and producer Swamp Dogg. It was released on March 6, 2020, via Joyful Noise Recordings in partnership with Pioneer Works Press. The recording sessions took place at Sound Emporium in Nashville. It was contributed to by John Prine, Justin Vernon, Jenny Lewis, and Ryan Olson, among others.

== Critical reception ==
Professional ratings
Aggregate scores
Source	Rating
Metacritic	79/100
Review scores
Source	Rating
AllMusic	3.5/5 stars
Exclaim!	7/10
God Is in the TV	8/10
Tom Hull	B+
Paste	8.2/10
Pitchfork	7.1/10
PopMatters	8/10 stars
Spectrum Culture	3.5/5 stars
Uncut	4/5 stars

Sorry You Couldn't Make It was met with generally favorable reviews from critics. At Metacritic, which assigns a weighted average rating out of 100 to reviews from mainstream publications, this release received an average score of 79, based on eight reviews. The aggregator Album of the Year has the critical consensus of the album at a 77 out of 100, based on eleven reviews.

Steven Edelstone of Paste praised the album saying "Sorry You Couldn't Make It represents yet another late-career experiment in a lengthy one filled with them, a back-to-basics approach by an artist who's seen it all. There’s no telling where Swamp Dogg goes from here, but if his most recent handful of releases are anything to go off of, it'll likely sound nothing like Sorry You Couldn't Make It. But it also means that no matter what genre he tries on next, the results will be astounding". Scott Zuppardo of PopMatters stated "Sure, he loves his horns, we all do, but his country roots are showing on this record, and it's glorious". John Lewis of Uncut said "The lyrics are presented with such conviction that it becomes quietly devastating. Rather like Swamp Dogg himself". Allison Hussey of Pitchfork said "His new album Sorry You Couldn't Make It restores him to a more even keel, examining grief from greater distance while savoring life's little sweetnesses. Billed as Williams' country album, Sorry You Couldn't Make It hits its thematic marks within funkified arrangements". AllMusic's Mark Deming said "Sorry You Couldn't Make It declares there should be a place for Swamp Dogg in the country pantheon alongside Charley Pride, Stoney Edwards, Darius Rucker, and the other brave artists who've confronted the color line in Nashville". Kaelen Bell of Exclaim! said "Though it still flirts with the blues, soul and R&B that he's built his name on, the record has a country-fried warmth, coloured by slide guitar and Southern rhythms. That those Southern rhythms are played mostly by chintzy drum machine, that they're undermined by hip-hop-biting guitar samples or artificial horns, is the record's vaguely outlandish appeal". Music critic Tom Hull said "Jerry Williams, started out as an Atlantic r&b producer, released a brilliant debut as Swamp Dogg in 1970, and has been fading in and out ever since, his best moments the ones farthest out. Plays it safe here with a round of soulful blues, but lured John Prine in to cameo on two nostalgic ones, which are daring enough".

== Track listing ==
No.	Title	Length
1.	"Sleeping Without You Is a Drag"	4:01
2.	"Good, Better, Best"	2:50
3.	"Don't Take Her (She's All I Got)"	4:59
4.	"Family Pain"	3:08
5.	"I Lay Awake"	3:42
6.	"Memories"	4:47
7.	"I'd Rather Be Your Used to Be"	4:15
8.	"Billy"	2:44
9.	"A Good Song"	2:54
10.	"Please Let Me Go Round Again"	4:40
Total length:		38:06

== Personnel ==
- Jerry "Swamp Dogg" Williams Jr. – vocals

Vocalists

- Channy Leaneagh – vocals (tracks: 1, 7)
- Jenny Lewis – vocals (tracks: 1, 7)
- Mina Moore – vocals (tracks: 1, 7)
- Justin Vernon – vocals (tracks: 2, 4), piano (track 1), guitar (tracks: 2–10)
- Carmen Marks – vocals (track 3)
- Courtland Williams – vocals (track 3)
- Harry Watkins – vocals (track 3)
- Leona Leshon – vocals (track 3)
- Sherron Crenshaw – vocals (track 3)
- Taj' London – vocals (track 3)
- John Prine – vocals (tracks: 6, 10)

Instrumentalists

- Jim Oblon – guitar (tracks: 1, 4)
- Chris Bierden – bass (tracks: 1–7, 9, 10)
- Larry "MoogStar" Clemon – synth (tracks: 1–3, 5–9), congas (track 6)
- Carmen J. Camerieri – horns (tracks: 2, 3, 9)
- Derrick Lee – Hammond B-3 (tracks: 1, 3, 10), Rhodes piano (tracks: 1, 2, 4, 5, 7, 10), piano (tracks: 3, 5–9), chorus arrangement (track 3)
- Jacob Hanson – guitar (track 3)
- Alistair Sung – cello (tracks: 3–5, 7)
- Sam Amidon – fiddle (track 4)

Technicals

- Ryan Olson – producer
- Mark Nevers – engineering, mixing
- Zack Pancoast – assistant engineering
- Robert Weston – mastering
- David McMurry – photography
- Daniel Kent – design, layout
- Ryan Hover – design, layout
