= How Can a Poor Man Stand Such Times and Live? =

Song performed by Bruce Springsteen

"How Can a Poor Man Stand Such Times and Live?" is an American folk song originally recorded on December 4, 1929, in New York City. It was written, composed, and performed by Blind Alfred Reed, accompanying himself on the violin. The song tells of hard times during the Great Depression. It is considered an early example of a protest song. In 2020, the song was added to the Grammy Hall of Fame.

There was once a time when everything was cheap.
But now prices almost puts a man to sleep.
When we pay our grocery bill,
We just feel like making our will.
Tell me how can a poor man stand such times and live?

== Cover versions ==
- The New Lost City Ramblers on their 1959 album Songs from the Depression.
- Ry Cooder on his 1970 self-titled album Ry Cooder. This version reorders the verses compared with Reed's original and is a very different arrangement; however, all of the lyrics come from the original version recorded by Reed.
- Bobby Doyle on his 1973 album Nine Songs.
- Paul Millns in the middle 1980s in Copenhagen together with Peter Thorup on guitar.
- Del Lords on their 1984 debut album Frontier Days. This ramped up version begins with the last verse of Reed's version and also includes several verses written by the band.
- Eric Burdon on his 1985 live album That's Live.
- The Blues Band on their 1993 album Homage.
- David Lindley accompanied by Hani Naser on the 1995 album, Official Bootleg #2: Live All Over the Place. This version uses the first, last and fifth original verses and takes minor lyrical liberties common to live performance.
- Boxcar Satan on their 2003 album Upstanding and Indigent. This version includes most of Reed's original lyrics but features a noisy, post-punk arrangement.
- Bruce Springsteen on his 2006 Seeger Sessions Band Tour, and then recorded and included on his October 2006 We Shall Overcome: The Seeger Sessions - American Land Edition album reissue. The Springsteen version only shares the lyrics of one of Reed's original verses, and owes more to Cooder's version musically than it does to the original. The rest of the verses were written by Springsteen about Hurricane Katrina and the subsequent criticism of the government response to Hurricane Katrina.
- Murray Head Trio on their 2009 album Blues & Beyond.
- UB40 on their 2013 album Getting Over the Storm. Many of the lyrics have been changed to reflect the 2008 financial crisis and differences between rich and poor.
- Dave Kelly on his 2015 live compilation album "Solo Performances Live in Germany 1986 to 1989"
- Joe Bonamassa on his 2017 album "Live at Carnegie Hall - An Acoustic Evening"
- Polo Hofer - Arme Maa
