= Howlin' at the Halloween Moon =

Live album by the Del-Lords
- Released: 1989
- Genre: Roots rock, rock and roll
- Length: 35:57
- Label: Restless

The Del-Lords chronology
Based on a True Story (1988)	Howlin' at the Halloween Moon (1989)	Lovers Who Wander (1990)

Professional ratings
Review scores
Source	Rating
AllMusic	2/5 stars
Chicago Tribune	2.5/4 stars

Howlin' at the Halloween Moon is a live album by the Del-Lords, released in 1989 through Restless Records.

== Track listing ==
All songs written by Scott Kempner, except "Jumpin' in the Night" by Cyril Jordan and Chris Wilson and "Tallahassee Lassie" by Bob Crewe, Frank Slay, and Frederick Picariello.

No.	Title	Length
1.	"True Love"	4:37
2.	"Jumpin' in the Night"	5:23
3.	"Wastin' Time Talkin'"	3:11
4.	"The Cool 'n' the Crazy"	7:43
5.	"Judas Kiss"	6:14
6.	"I Play the Drums"	5:37
7.	"Tallahassee Lassie"	3:11

== Personnel ==
- Scott Kempner – lead vocals, guitar
- Eric Ambel – guitar, vocals
- Manny Caiati – bass guitar, vocals
- Frank Funaro – drums, vocals
