= Neil Giraldo =

American musician (born 1955)

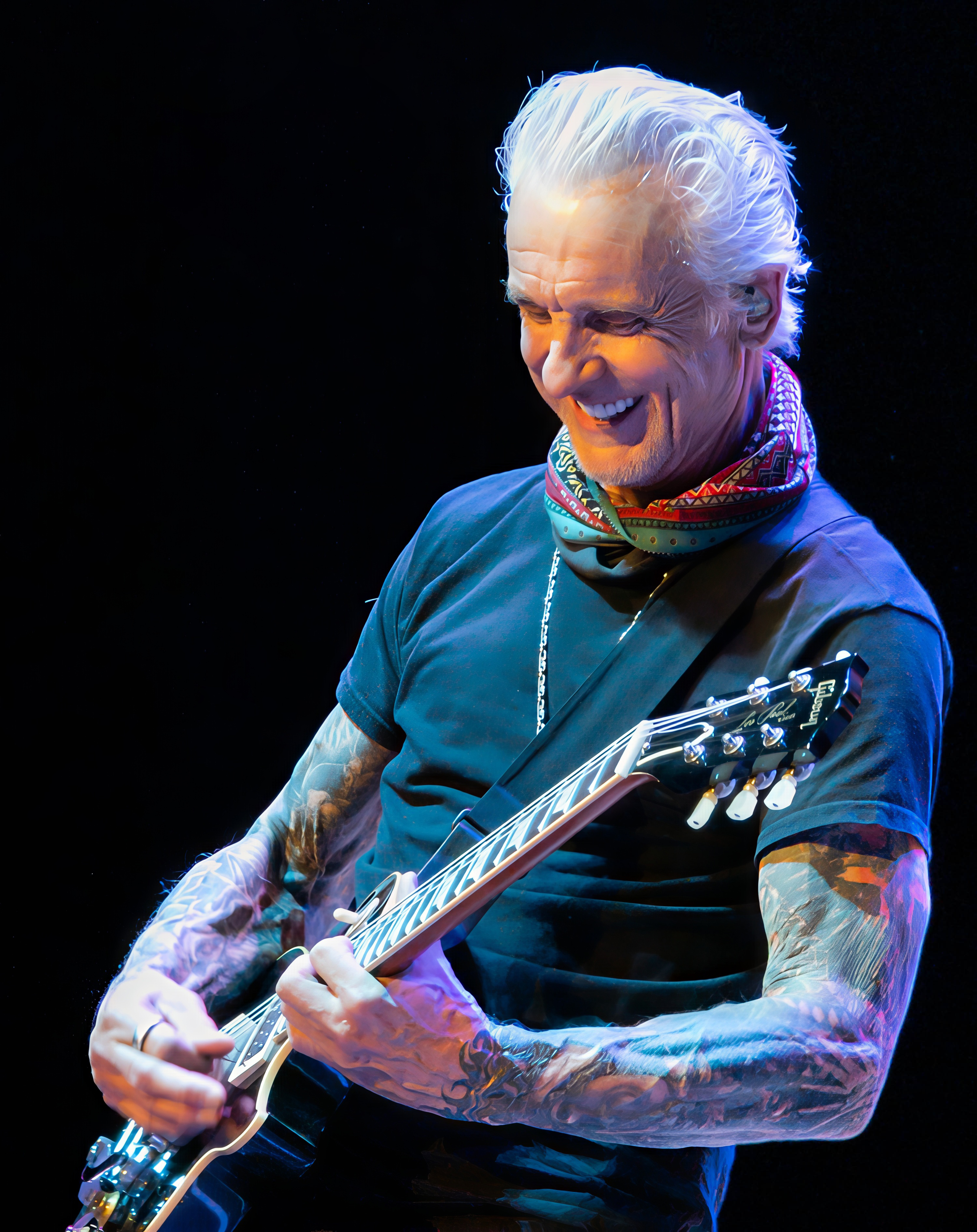
- Giraldo in 2025

Background information
- Also known as: Spyder James; Neil Geraldo
- Born: December 29, 1955 (age 70); Cleveland, Ohio, U.S.
- Origin: Parma Senior High School, Ohio
- Genres: Hard rock; blues; pop rock
- Occupations: Musician; songwriter; producer; arranger; guitarist
- Instruments: Guitar; piano; drums; vocals
- Years active: 1978–present
- Labels: Chrysalis; CMC International; Bel Chaisso Records
- Spouse: Pat Benatar (m. 1982)
- Children: 2
- Website: threechordbourbon.com www.benatargiraldo.com

Neil Thomas Giraldo (born December 29, 1955) is an American musician, record producer, arranger, and songwriter best known as the musical partner of Pat Benatar since 1979 – and husband since 1982. He has also performed, written and produced for artists including Rick Derringer, John Waite, Rick Springfield, Kenny Loggins, Steve Forbert, The Del-Lords, Scott Kempner, and Beth Hart. Giraldo's diverse work has sold over 45 million records and his contributions have produced five Grammy Awards and an additional four Grammy nominations. In 2022, he was inducted into the Rock and Roll Hall of Fame alongside Benatar.

== Early life ==
Giraldo was born on December 29, 1955, in Cleveland, Ohio, graduating from Parma Senior High School in Parma, Ohio, to Sicilian parents, Anthony and Angela Giraldo. At the age of six, Giraldo received his first guitar as a gift from his parents. Giraldo notes his first live performances as playing Italian songs after church for family and friends, alongside his sister Priscilla, who played the accordion. He later started playing in local bands at the age of 14, venturing into nightclubs with his uncle, who sang while Giraldo played the guitar. He learned to play the piano at the age of 12, and afterwards learned the drums. Throughout his childhood, Giraldo credits being influenced by revolutionary bands of the 1960s and 1970s such as The Yardbirds, The Kinks, and The Who. Jazz artists such as bandleader Count Basie, jazz pianist Jay McShann, and blues shouter Big Joe Turner provided inspiration and deepened Giraldo's respect and admiration for the genre.

== Professional career ==
Giraldo began his professional music career in 1978 as a member of the Rick Derringer band after competing alongside 200 fellow guitarists for the position. Giraldo provided his guitar, as well as piano skills for Derringer's 1979 recording of Guitars and Women. In the spring of 1979, Mike Chapman introduced Giraldo to Pat Benatar who had recently signed a recording contract with Chrysalis Records. Chapman felt Giraldo's affinity for arranging and musical direction would facilitate the creation of a sound both identifiable and powerful. Over the years Giraldo has produced some of Benatar's biggest hits including "Love Is a Battlefield" and "We Belong". Giraldo has performed on every Benatar album and produced all but two.

Benatar's debut album In the Heat of the Night was released in August 1979 and reached No. 12 in the US in early 1980. The album was certified platinum by the Recording Industry Association of America in December 1980. The album featured the Giraldo penned hit "We Live for Love".

The release of Crimes of Passion, in August 1980, featured the single "Hit Me with Your Best Shot," which reached No. 9 on the Billboard Hot 100 and sold over a million copies in the United States, achieving a platinum certification by the RIAA. Also on the album was the controversial song "Hell Is for Children," co-written by Giraldo, which was inspired by a New York Times article about child abuse in America The album peaked for five consecutive weeks at No. 2 in the US and was featured in the 1981 adult animated musical drama film American Pop.

Precious Time marked the first of many Benatar albums produced by Giraldo, and was released in July 1981, reaching No. 1 on the Billboard US Top 200 LP chart, followed in late 1982 by Get Nervous, which reached No. 4 in the US and earned RIAA and CRIA platinum certifications. Live from Earth, recorded during the band's Get Nervous world tour, reached No. 13 and received RIAA and CRIA platinum certification.

On August 1, 1981, MTV launched and debuted the music video "You Better Run" as the second-ever video to air on the network, thus distinguishing Giraldo as the first guitarist to appear on MTV.

The 1981 album Working Class Dog by Rick Springfield featured Giraldo as the guitarist, bassist, and producer for "I’ve Done Everything for You" and the number one hit "Jessie's Girl".

Giraldo was also the producer for the John Waite album Ignition, released on May 21, 1982. The album featured the single "Change", which also appeared on the soundtrack for the 1985 film, Vision Quest.

Tropico was released in August 1984, featuring a new sound, less hard rock. It, too, earned RIAA and CRIA platinum certification. A year later, Seven the Hard Way, was released, earning an RIAA gold certification. Giraldo and Benatar's success continued with Wide Awake in Dreamland in the summer of 1988, again earning RIAA gold certification.

In late April 1991, True Love was released, followed by Gravity's Rainbow in 1993, which was the last album recorded with Chrysalis Records.

Innamorata was released in June 1997 and was recorded under the CMC International record label. The album featured the single "Strawberry Wine".

Giraldo began film scoring in 2001 with his debut work for the film Nailed, starring Harvey Keitel.

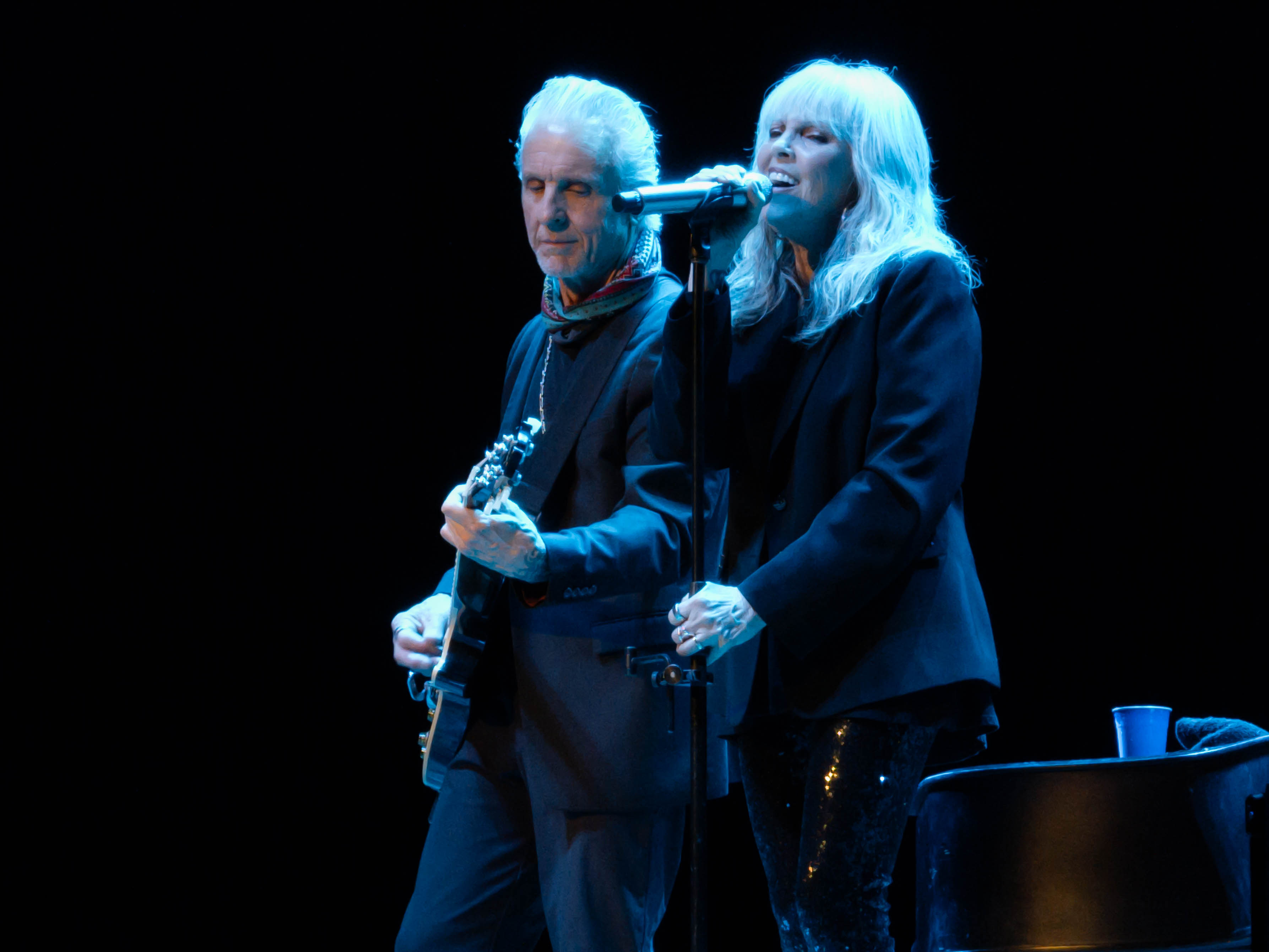
Giraldo performing with his wife Pat Benatar, 2025

The Pat Benatar album Go was released in August 2003 under the Bel Chiasso label. The album included the 9/11 charity single, "Christmas in America".

In 2004 Giraldo was the film composer for the film Smile, which featured Sean Astin, Beau Bridges, and Linda Hamilton.

In September 2019, Giraldo received the AFMX 2019 Music Award, as part of the Albuquerque Film and Music Experience Festival.

== Other ventures ==
In 2017, Giraldo founded and is the chairman of Steel Bending Spirits LLC. Based in Ann Arbor, Michigan, the spirits company released its inaugural offering, Three Chord Bourbon in July 2018. In July 2019, Steel Bending Spirits expanded its Three Chord Bourbon product line, introducing two new variations, Twelve Bar Reserve and Amplify Rye.

== Personal life ==
Neil Giraldo married singer Pat Benatar in 1982. They have two daughters, Haley Giraldo and Hana Giraldo (who have both appeared on the E! reality television series Filthy Rich: Cattle Drive and Relatively Famous: Ranch Rules in late 2005 and early 2022).

Giraldo is called "Spyder" because his wife gave him the nickname early in their relationship after they saw a club called "Spyder's Dinner Club" painted in his favorite colors, black and yellow, and he loved fast cars (Spyders). She thought the name suited his fast, intense energy, and it stuck as a term of endearment.

While Benatar and Giraldo are both Roman Catholic, the two did not marry within the Church due to the former's divorce. The two were married in Hana, Hawaii, by Rev. Henry Kahula of the nondenominational Wainanalua Church on February 20, 1982, just days before the 24th Grammy Awards.

== Charitable work ==
Giraldo has been a long time advocate for the support of children and their well-being. Since 1996 Giraldo has been hosting and performing at fundraising events and lending assistance to the non-profit organization, The Children's Lifesaving Foundation. The Children's Lifesaving Organization supports the lives of homeless and high-risk youth in Los Angeles by providing social, academic and domestic support.

In 2016 Giraldo became involved with the Oakland School for the Arts, a charter school located in Oakland California. In April 2016, the school unveiled the Neil Giraldo Recording Studio as a welcome gift to the music department.

In 2019 the United Outreach Foundation welcomed Giraldo as a member of the board of directors. United Outreach Foundation is a 501c3 organization providing community support for homelessness, food scarcity, education and animal welfare.

== Recognition ==
In 2016 Giraldo and Benatar were awarded the Children's LSF foundation's Angel of the Year Award for their continued service with the organization.

On April 12, 2016, Giraldo and Benatar were honored with the Artistic Award of Courage, celebrating both artists for their advocacy toward the ending of child abuse. The award was presented in conjunction with the Jane and Terry Semel Institute for Neuroscience and Human Behavior at the University of California, Los Angeles, and the Board of Advisors, via The Stewart and Lydia Resnick Neuropsychiatric Hospital at UCLA.

In September 2019, Giraldo received the AFMX 2019 Music Award, as part of the Albuquerque Film and Music Experience Festival.

On October 15, 2019, Giraldo was co-nominated with his wife for induction in the Rock and Roll Hall of Fame. His nomination came for his co-creating the Pat Benatar band, where he was lead guitarist, songwriter and producer for 40 years. Although the duo was not chosen for induction in 2020, they were again nominated in 2022 and were chosen as one of seven inductees.

== Discography ==
=== Studio albums ===
List of albums, with selected chart positions, sales, and certifications (all with Benatar, unless otherwise noted)
Title	Album details	Peak chart positions			Certifications
Title	Album details	US	UK	CAN	Certifications
Guitars and Women (piano, guitar) – (Rick Derringer)	Release date: 1979; Label: Blue Sky; Format: LP, cassette, audio cd	–	—	—	—
In the Heat of the Night (songwriter, guitar, keyboards, vocals)	Release date: August 27, 1979; Label: Chrysalis; Format: LP, 8-track, cassette, cd	12	98	3	RIAA: Platinum; MC: 4× Platinum; SNEP: Gold
Crimes of Passion (songwriter, guitar, keyboards, vocals)	Release date: August 6, 1980; Label: Chrysalis; Format: LP record, 8-track, cassette, cd	2	—	2	RIAA: 4× Platinum; MC: 5× Platinum; SNEP: Gold
Precious Time (producer, songwriter, guitar, keyboards, vocals)	Release date: July 6, 1981; Label: Chrysalis; Format: LP, 8-track, cassette, cd	1	30	2	RIAA: 2× Platinum; MC: 2× Platinum; SNEP: Gold
Ignition (producer) – John Waite	Release date: June 29, 1982; Label: Chrysalis; Format: LP, vinyl	68	—	—	—
Get Nervous (producer, songwriter, guitar, keyboards, harmonica)	Release date: October 29, 1982; Label: Chrysalis; Format: LP	4	73	16	RIAA: Platinum; MC: Platinum; SNEP: Gold
Live from Earth (producer, songwriter, guitar, keyboards)	Release date: September 22, 1983; Label: Chrysalis; Format: LP	13	60	25	RIAA: Platinum; MC: Platinum
Tropico (producer, songwriter, guitar, keyboards)	Release date: November 1, 1984; Label: Chrysalis; Format: LP	14	31	21	RIAA: Platinum; MC: Platinum; BPI: Silver
Seven the Hard Way (producer, guitar, songwriter, keyboards)	Release date: October 30, 1985; Label: Chrysalis; Format: LP	26	69	36	RIAA: Gold; MC: Platinum
Johnny Comes Marching Home (producer and mixer) – The Del-Lords	Release date: 1986; Label: EMI America; Format: LP	–	–	–	—
Based on a True Story (producer and mixer) – The Del-Lords	Release date: 1988; Label: Enigma; Format: LP	–	–	–	—
Wide Awake in Dreamland (songwriter, guitar, keyboards, producer)	Release date: June 22, 1988; Label: Chrysalis; Format: LP	28	11	11	RIAA: Gold; BPI: Gold; MC: Platinum
True Love (guitar, songwriter, producer)	Release date: April 9, 1991; Label: Chrysalis; Format: LP	37	40	22	MC: Gold
Gravity's Rainbow (songwriter, guitar, keyboards, producer)	Release date: May 24, 1993; Label: Chrysalis; Format: LP	85	–	44	—
Innamorata (songwriter, producer, guitar, keyboards, vocals)	Release date: June 3, 1997; Label: CMC International; Format: LP	171	—	—	—
Go (producer, guitar, songwriter, vocals, keyboards)	Release date: August 12, 2003; Label: Bel Chiasso Records; Format: CD	187	–	—	—

=== Singles and collaborations ===
Year	Singles/Collaborations	Role	Artist
1981	Working Class Dog, "Jessie's Girl", "I've Done Everything for You"	Producer, Guitar, Bass	Rick Springfield
1982	"Don't Fight It"	Arranger, Guitar	Kenny Loggins
1983	Down in Flames	Producer	Steve Forbert
1985	Vision Quest (soundtrack)	Producer	Multiple
1997	Intimacy	Songwriter	The Corrs
2001	Nailed	Film composer	Multiple
2001	California Dreamin'	Producer	Beth Hart
2004	SMILE	Film composer	Multiple
2015	One December Night	Keyboards, songwriter, guitar, producer	Pat Benatar
2017	Shine	Producer, guitar, drums, keyboards	Pat Benatar
2018	Dancing Through the Wreckage	Songwriter	Pat Benatar
2023	"Heartbreaker"	Featured artist alongside Pat Benatar	Dolly Parton
