= Based on a True Story (The Del-Lords album) =

Studio album by the Del-Lords
- Released: 1988
- Genre: Rock
- Length: 44:26
- Label: Enigma
- Producer: Neil Giraldo

The Del-Lords chronology
Johnny Comes Marching Home (1986)	Based on a True Story (1988)	Howlin' at the Halloween Moon (1989)

Based on a True Story is an album by the American band the Del-Lords, released in 1988 on Enigma Records. The band supported the album with a North American tour.

== Production ==
Recorded in Los Angeles, the album cost $120,000. It was produced by Neil Giraldo. Pat Benatar duetted with Scott Kempner on "Poem of the River".

== Critical reception ==
Professional ratings
Review scores
Source	Rating
AllMusic	4/5 stars
Chicago Tribune	2.5/4 stars
Robert Christgau	B+

The Washington Post wrote that "Kempner spreads on the working-class persona a little thick at times, but this is still the equal of any previous Del-Lords set." The Toronto Star deemed the album "a rip-snorting, noisy, trashy little garage opus."

The Chicago Tribune determined that "the album, energy and polish notwithstanding, emerges as a good but not great package with a faintly 'generic' feel." The New York Times concluded that "the straightforward, stomping rock songs on the band's third album ... insist on independent thinking and truthfulness."

== Track listing ==
All songs written by Scott Kempner.

No.	Title	Length
1.	"Crawl in Bed"	3:57
2.	"Judas Kiss"	4:36
3.	"Ashes to Ashes"	4:19
4.	"I'm Gonna Be Around"	3:01
5.	"Poem of the River"	5:58
6.	"The Cool and the Crazy"	5:18
7.	"Cheyenne"	3:47
8.	"A Lover's Prayer"	4:45
9.	"Whole Lotta Nothin' Goin' On"	3:34
10.	"River of Justice"	5:10

== Personnel ==
The Del-Lords

- Scott Kempner – lead vocals, guitar
- Eric Ambel – guitar, vocals, keyboards on "The Cool and the Crazy" and "River of Justice", lead vocals on "Judas Kiss" and "A Lover's Prayer"
- Manny Caiati – bass guitar, vocals
- Frank Funaro – drums, vocals

Additional musicians and production

- Scotty Bem – gong
- Pat Benatar – backing vocals on "Judas Kiss" & "Poem of the River"
- Lenny Castro – percussion
- Spyder Curtis James – keyboards on "Judas Kiss", "Poem of the River" and "Ashes to Ashes"
- Frank Linx – vocals on "Cheyenne", "Whole Lotta Nothin' Goin' On", "A Lover's Prayer", "Judas Kiss" and "River of Justice"
- Rev. Mojo Nixon – sermon on "River of Justice"
- Johnny Powers – harp on "River of Justice" and "A Lover's Prayer"
- Kevin Savigar – keyboards on "Whole Lotta Nothin' Goin' On" and "Poem of the River"
- Kim Shattuck & Karen Blankfeld of The Pandoras – vocals on "The Cool and the Crazy"
- Syd Straw – backing vocals on "Judas Kiss", "River of Justice" and "Ashes to Ashes"
- Gordon Fordyce – engineer
- Michael Frondelli – mixing
- Neil Geraldo – production
- Assistant engineers: Bill Cooper, Angus Davidson, Scott E. Gordon
