= Swamp Dogg =

American songwriter (born 1942)

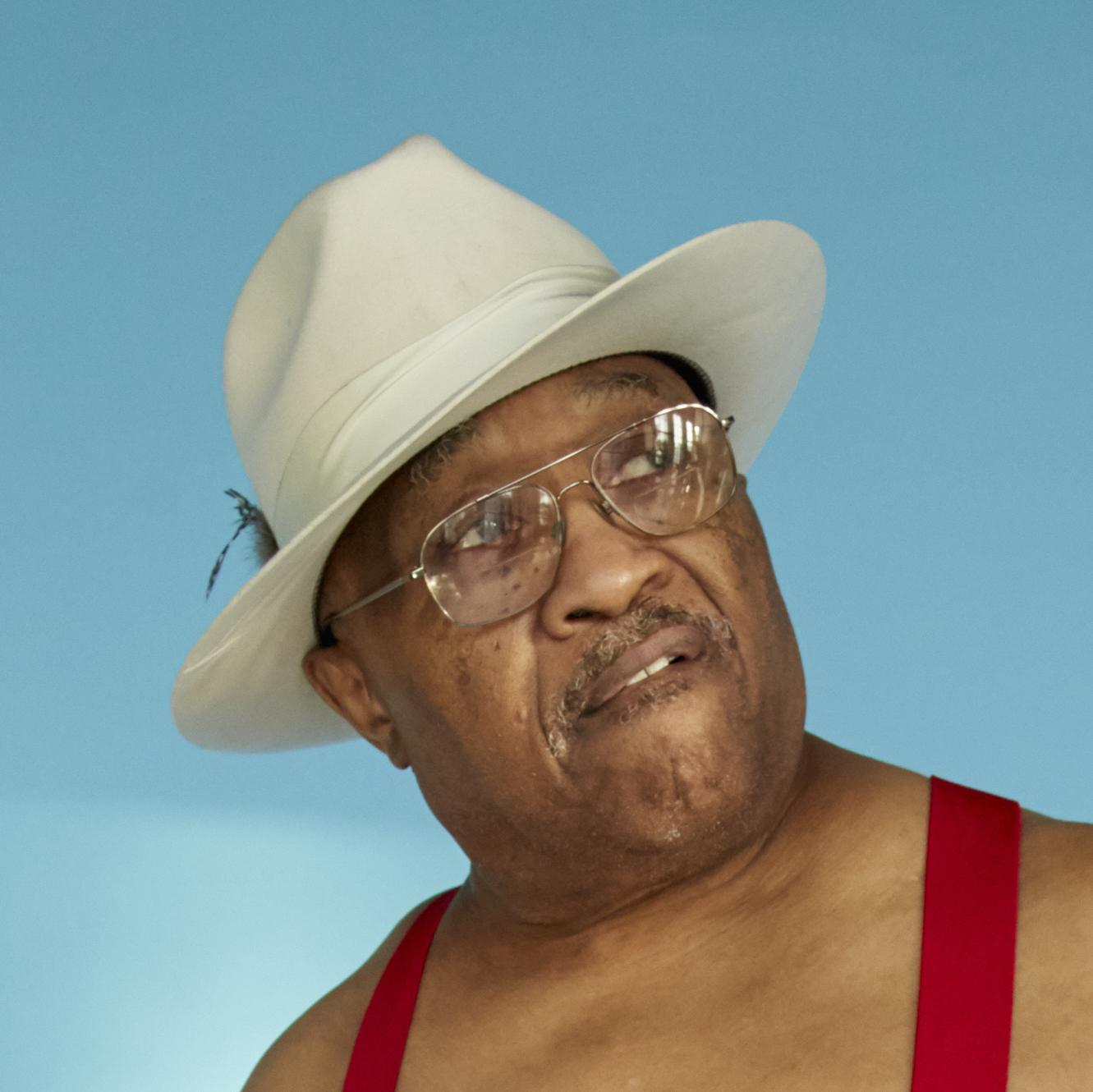
- Born: Jerry Williams Jr. 12 July 1942 (age 84); Portsmouth, Virginia, U.S.
- Other names: Little Jerry; Little Jerry Williams
- Occupations: Singer; songwriter; record producer
- Years active: 1954–present
- Musical career
- Genres: Psychedelic soul; R&B; country soul; disco
- Instruments: Vocals; Piano
- Labels: Sunglasses, Oh Boy Records, S-Curve Records
- Website: theswampdogg.com

Jerry Williams Jr. (born July 12, 1942), generally credited under the pseudonym Swamp Dogg after 1970, is an American country soul and R&B singer, musician, songwriter and record producer. Williams has been described as "one of the great cult figures of 20th century American music."

After recording as Little Jerry and Little Jerry Williams in the 1950s and 1960s, he reinvented himself as Swamp Dogg, releasing a series of satirical, offbeat, and eccentric recordings, as well as continuing to write and produce for other musicians. He debuted his new sound on the Total Destruction to Your Mind album in 1970. In the 1980s, he helped to develop Alonzo Williams' World Class Wreckin' Cru, which produced Dr. Dre among others. He continues to make music, releasing Love, Loss, and Auto-Tune on Joyful Noise Recordings in 2018, Sorry You Couldn't Make It in 2020, and I Need a Job...So I Can Buy More Auto-Tune in 2022 on Don Giovanni Records. In 2024, he released Blackgrass: From West Virginia to 125th St on Oh Boy, a label founded by the late John Prine. In 2026 he released his cover of Jenny Lewis's song "Acid Tongue" as the first single from his album "Swamp Dogg Contemplates the Afterlife," set for release in June, 2026 on S-Curve Records. The album was produced by Swamp Dogg together with Steve Greenberg, Sam Hollander, and Michael Mangini.

== Biography ==
=== Early life and recording career ===
Williams was born in Portsmouth, Virginia. He made his first recording, "HTD Blues (Hardsick Troublesome Downout Blues)", for the Mechanic record label in 1954, when he was aged 12, with his parents and uncle and backing musicians, and was regularly hired to play private parties. From 1960, he released occasional singles for a variety of labels, including the self-written "I'm The Lover Man" in 1964, which was first issued on the Southern Sound label and was then picked up by the larger Loma label, almost breaking into the national Billboard Hot 100. He also wrote successfully for other musicians, including "Big Party" for Barbara and the Browns.

As Little Jerry Williams, he had his first national chart success in 1966, when "Baby You're My Everything", which he co-wrote and produced, was released on the Calla label and rose to #32 on the R&B chart, again just missing the Hot 100. He released several more singles on Calla through to 1967, by now credited simply as Jerry Williams, but with little commercial success, although some of his records such as "If You Ask Me (Because I Love You)" later became staples of the Northern Soul movement in the UK.

By late 1967 he started working in A&R and other duties for the Musicor label in New York. In 1968 he co-wrote, with Charlie Foxx, Gene Pitney's up-tempo hit, "She's a Heartbreaker", which Williams also claimed to have produced, saying: "I produced the motherfuck out of it... [and] Charlie Foxx put me down on the label as "vocal arranger." What the fuck is that? When they took out full-page ads in Billboard and Cashbox, there was a picture of Charlie on one side and a picture of Gene Pitney on the other and no mention of me."

Later in 1968 Williams began working as a producer at Atlantic Records with Jerry Wexler and Phil Walden, on artists including Patti LaBelle & the Blue Belles, though he found the administration frustrating. He established a songwriting partnership with Gary Anderson, who performed as Gary U.S. Bonds, and the pair wrote the R&B chart hits "To the Other Woman (I'm the Other Woman)" by Doris Duke, and "She Didn't Know (She Kept on Talking)" by Dee Dee Warwick. He also recorded a single, "I Got What It Takes", in a duo with Brooks O'Dell, and released two singles under his own name on the Cotillion label, a subsidiary of Atlantic.

=== Work as Swamp Dogg ===
Williams later wrote:

I became Swamp Dogg in 1970 in order to have an alter-ego and someone to occupy the body while the search party was out looking for Jerry Williams, who was mentally missing in action due to certain pressures, mal-treatments and failure to get paid royalties on over fifty single records.... Most all of the tracks included were recorded in Muscle Shoals, Alabama, and Macon, Georgia, which brings me to how the name Swamp Dogg came about. Jerry Wexler, Atlantic Records v.p. and producer/innovator second to none, was recording in the newly discovered mecca of funk Muscle Shoals, Alabama. He coined the term "Swamp Music" for this awesome funk predominately played by all white musicians accompanying the R'n'B institutions e.g., Wilson Pickett, Aretha Franklin, King Curtis... I was also using the same "swamp" players. I was tired of being a jukebox, singing all of the hits by Chuck Jackson, Ben E. King, etc., and being an R'n'B second banana. I couldn't dance as good as Joe Tex, wasn't pretty like Tommy Hunt, couldn't compare vocally to Jackie Wilson and I didn't have the sex appeal of Daffy Duck. I wanted to sing about everything and anything and not be pigeonholed by the industry. So I came up with the name Dogg because a dog can do anything, and anything a dog does never comes as a real surprise; if he sleeps on the sofa, shits on the rug, pisses on the drapes, chews up your slippers, humps your mother-in-law's leg, jumps on your new clothes and licks your face, he's never gotten out of character. You understand what he did, you curse while making allowances for him but your love for him never diminishes. Commencing in 1970, I sung about sex, niggers, love, rednecks, war, peace, dead flies, home wreckers, Sly Stone, my daughters, politics, revolution and blood transfusions (just to name a few), and never got out of character. Recording in Alabama and sincerely singing/writing about items that interested me, gave birth to the name Swamp Dogg.

Having adopted his moniker before Snoop Dogg was born, he has claimed to be "the original D-O double G".

In 1970, he emerged in his new Swamp Dogg persona, with two singles on Wally Roker's Canyon label, "Mama's Baby, Daddy's Maybe", again co-written with Bonds, and "Synthetic World". He also produced the first Swamp Dogg album, Total Destruction to Your Mind. The album sleeve showed Williams sitting in his underwear on a pile of garbage. Williams' new direction apparently followed an LSD trip, and was inspired by the radical politics of the time and by Frank Zappa's use of satire, while showing his own expertise in, and commitment to, deep soul and R&B music. According to Allmusic: "In sheer musical terms, Swamp Dogg is pure Southern soul, anchored on tight grooves and accentuated by horns, but the Dogg is as much about message as music..." Although not a commercial success at the time, Swamp Dogg started to develop a cult following and eventually the album sold enough to achieve gold record status. Record critic Robert Christgau wrote that "Soul-seekers like myself are moderately mad for the obscure" album and has called it "legendary". It was reissued in 2013 by Alive Naturalsound Records.

Around the same time, one of the songs Williams had co-written with Gary Bonds, "She's All I Got", became a top-ten R&B hit for Freddie North, and was recorded with even greater success by country star Johnny Paycheck, whose version reached #2 on the country music chart in late 1971. In a later interview on NPR's Studio 360, Williams stated he was raised on country music: "Black music didn't start 'til 10 at night until 4 in the morning and I was in bed by then... If you strip my tracks, take away all the horns and guitar licks, what you have is a country song." However, he also continued to write and produce deep soul songs for other musicians, including Z. Z. Hill and Irma Thomas. In 1971 in collaboration with co-producer and writer the legendary George Semper he released "Monster Walk Pt. 1 and 2" by the Rhythm 'N' Blues Classical Funk Band on Mankind Records label. Produced for Jerry Williams Productions, Inc.and in spite of modest sales the record once again demonstrated his entrepreneurial skill as an artist.

As Swamp Dogg, he was signed by Elektra Records for his second album, Rat On! in 1971. The sleeve showed him on the back of a giant white rat, and has frequently been ranked as one of the worst album covers of all time. Sales were relatively poor, and he joined Jane Fonda's anti-Vietnam War Free the Army tour. His next albums Cuffed, Collared and Tagged (1972) and Gag a Maggott (recorded at the TK Studio in 1973) were released on smaller labels, though his 1974 album, Have You Heard This Story??, was issued by Island Records. In 1977 he had another minor R&B hit with "My Heart Just Can't Stop Dancing", credited to Swamp Dogg & the Riders of the New Funk. He continued to release albums through the 1970s and into the mid-1980s as Swamp Dogg, on various small independent labels and in a variety of styles including disco and country and maintained a healthy cult following. He also set up his own publishing and recording company, Swamp Dogg Entertainment Group (SDEG).

In 1999, "Slow Slow Disco" was sampled by Kid Rock on the track "I Got One for Ya", sparking a revival of interest in Swamp Dogg, who began performing live gigs for the first time. Several other of his recordings were sampled, and in 2009 he released two new albums, Give Em as Little as You Can...As Often as You Have To...Or...A Tribute to Rock N Roll, and An Awful Christmas and a Lousy New Year. He also released some further singles, and a compilation album of the best of his work as both Little Jerry Williams and Swamp Dogg, It's All Good, was released in 2009. Most of his early Swamp Dogg albums have also been reissued on CD.

=== Recent work ===
Swamp Dogg released a full-length album of new songs in 2014, The White Man Made Me Do It, which Williams described as being a sort of sequel to Total Destruction To Your Mind. Shortly thereafter, Swamp Dogg teamed up with Ryan Olson from Poliça to produce the tracks for his 2018 album Love, Loss & Autotune, Justin Vernon (aka Bon Iver) fine-tuning the vocal tracks. The song also features instrumentation by Guitar Shorty. The music video for "I'll Pretend" premiered at NPR and was later featured at Rolling Stone, Pitchfork, Spin and elsewhere. Swamp Dogg described the song as a character study about "a guy sitting in a restaurant by himself losing his fucking mind because he's hoping his woman is gonna walk by, but she's at a Ramada Inn somewhere fucking somebody else to death."

In 2020, he released the album Sorry You Couldn't Make It, a country-styled record recorded in Nashville with producer Ryan Olson and musicians including Justin Vernon, John Prine, and Jenny Lewis.

In 2022, he released I Need a Job...So I Can Buy More Auto-Tune on Don Giovanni Records.

He co-produced the album "Crazy on the Island" by singer/guitarist Crazy Tomes, and sang on some of the tunes, including the radio hit single "King of Pot".

In 2024, he was profiled in the documentary film Swamp Dogg Gets His Pool Painted.

== Discography ==
=== Albums ===
- Total Destruction to Your Mind (Canyon, 1970)
- Rat On! (Elektra Records, 1971)
- Cuffed, Collared & Tagged (Cream Records, 1972)
- Gag a Maggott (Stone Dogg, 1973)
- Have You Heard This Story?? (Island Records, 1974)
- ??? Greatest Hits ??? (Stone Dogg, 1976)
- You Ain't Never Too Old to Boogie (DJM Records, 1976)
- An Opportunity... Not a Bargain!!! (Wizard Records, 1977)
- Finally Caught Up with Myself (Musicor Records, 1977)
- Doing a Party Tonite (Cream Records, 1980)
- I'm Not Selling Out - I'm Buying In! (Takoma Records, 1981)
- Swamp Dogg (Ala, 1982)
- I Called for a Rope And They Threw Me a Rock (SDEG, 1989)
- Surfin' in Harlem (Volt Records, 1991)
- The Re-Invention of Swamp Dogg (SDEG, 2000)
- If I Ever Kiss It .... He Can Kiss It Goodbye! (SDEG, 2002)
- Resurrection (SDEG, 2007)
- Swamp Dogg Droppin's (SDEG, 2008)
- Give 'em as Little as You Can...As Often as You Have To...or...A Tribute to Rock 'n' Roll (S-Curve Records, 2009)
- An Awful Christmas and a Lousy New Year (SDEG, 2009)
- The White Man Made Me Do It (2014)
- Don't Give Up on Me: The Lost Country Album (Essential Media Group, 2014)
- Love, Loss, and Auto-Tune (Joyful Noise Recordings, 2018)
- Sorry You Couldn't Make It (Joyful Noise Recordings, 2020)
- I Need a Job...So I Can Buy More Auto-Tune (Don Giovanni Records, 2022)
- Blackgrass: From West Virginia to 125th St (Oh Boy Records, 2024)
- Swamp Dogg Contemplates the Afterlife (S-Curve, 2026)

=== Compilations ===
==== Little Jerry Williams ====
- Little Jerry Williams Anthology (1954-1969), aka Swamp Dogg (SDEG, 2000)

==== Swamp Dogg ====
- Best of 25 Years of Swamp Dogg...or F**k the Bomb, Stop the Drugs (Pointblank Records, 1995)
- The Excellent Sides of Swamp Dogg, Vol. 1 (contains albums Total Destruction To Your Mind and Rat On!) (SDEG, 1996)
- The Excellent Sides of Swamp Dogg, Vol. 2 (contains albums Cuffed, Collared & Tagged and Gag A Maggott) (SDEG, 2001)
- The Excellent Sides of Swamp Dogg, Vol. 3 (contains albums Have You Heard This Story?? and I Called For A Rope And They Threw Me A Rock) (SDEG, 2007)
- The Excellent Sides of Swamp Dogg, Vol. 4 (contains albums ??? Greatest Hits ??? and Finally Caught Up With Myself) (SDEG, 2007)
- The Excellent Sides of Swamp Dogg, Vol. 5 (contains albums You Ain't Never Too Old To Boogie and Don't Give Up On Me: The Lost Country Album) (SDEG, 2007)
- It's All Good: A Singles Collection 1963-1989 (Kent Records, 2011)
- 13 Prime Weiners, Everything on It!: Best of Swamp Dogg (Essential Media Group, 2014)
- Hits Anthology: Swamp Dogg, a.k.a. Little Jerry Williams (Essential Media Group, 2014)

=== Multiple-artist compilations ===
- "Southern Soul" on Safe In Sound (Home Recordings From Quarantine) (Joyful Noise Recordings, 2020)

=== Chart singles ===
==== Little Jerry Williams ====
- "Baby, You're My Everything" (Calla Records, 1966, #32 R&B chart)

==== Swamp Dogg ====
- "Mama's Baby - Daddy's Maybe" (Canyon, 1970, #33 R&B chart, #113 Pop)
- "My Heart Just Can't Stop Dancing" (Musicor, 1977, #71 R&B chart)
