= Loud & Lonesome =

Studio album by Eric Ambel
- Released: 1994, Belgium; 1995, United States
- Genre: Rock, roots rock
- Label: Survival Europe; East Side Digital
- Producer: Eric Ambel

Eric Ambel chronology
Roscoe's Gang (1988)	Loud & Lonesome (1994)

Loud & Lonesome is an album by the American musician Eric Ambel. The album is credited to Eric Ambel and Roscoe's Gang, with Ambel adopting his Roscoe persona. It was first released by Belgium's Survival Europe record label.

The album was reissued in 2004, via Ambel's Lakeside Lounge Records.

== Production ==
The album was written with Dan Baird, Kevin Salem, and Dan Zanes, among others. Produced by Ambel, it was recorded with drummer Keith Lervreault, of Blood Oranges, and bass player Andy York, who had played with John Mellencamp.

A hidden track at the end of the album, "Frozen Head State Park", marked the recording debut of Ambel's Yayhoos.

== Critical reception ==
Professional ratings
Review scores
Source	Rating
AllMusic	3/5 stars
Entertainment Weekly	A−
MusicHound Rock: The Essential Album Guide	4/5 stars
The Province	3/4 stars
The Record	3/4 stars

No Depression thought that Ambel's "urgent guitar playing repeatedly breaks through the themes of self-imposed isolation." Trouser Press wrote that, "with his overdriven, wailing guitar and reedy vocals, [Ambel] favors the more rock side of the (don’t-call-it) cowpunk equation, sounding like a less-ravaged Neil Young." The Record praised the "ferocious guitar work."

Entertainment Weekly opined that Loud & Lonesome "evokes Texas via the Lower East Side, on the strength of rough-hewn stylings and achy ballads." Guitar Player wrote: "Blending tremoloed chords, searing feedback, clanging riffs, ringing flat-top, and tangy country bends, Ambel conjures a desolate campfire lit by blinking neon and littered with empty beer cans." The Philadelphia Inquirer deemed the album "a rugged platter ... delivered with the authority of Zuma-era Neil Young."

AllMusic wrote: "A tougher and darker effort than one might expect from Ambel, Loud and Lonesome isn't always an easy listen, but it's certainly a rewarding one."

== Track listing ==
No.	Title	Length
1.	"Song for the Walls"
2.	"Miles from the Machine"
3.	"Way Outside"
4.	"Three Feet Under"
5.	"I'm Not Alone"
6.	"One More Moment Gone"
7.	"Downtown at Midnight"
8.	"The Rain Won't Stop"
9.	"Long Gone Dream"
10.	"Autumn Rose"
11.	"Red Apple Juice"
