= Johnny Comes Marching Home =

Studio album by the Del-Lords
- Released: 1986
- Genre: Rock and roll, rock
- Length: 46:42 (vinyl edition); 67:30 (CD edition)
- Label: EMI America
- Producer: Neil Giraldo

The Del-Lords chronology
Frontier Days (1984)	Johnny Comes Marching Home (1986)	Based on a True Story (1988)

Johnny Comes Marching Home is the second album by the American band the Del-Lords. It was released in 1986 on EMI America Records.

== Critical reception ==
Professional ratings
Review scores
Source	Rating
AllMusic	3/5 stars
Robert Christgau	B+

The Philadelphia Inquirer wrote that the album "offers old-fashioned rock-and-roll with earnest, even patriotic principles that nonetheless rarely sounds strained or sentimental." The Globe and Mail deemed the album "as unpretentious as rock can get while still maintaining its spark." The Los Angeles Times noted that, "on paper, the lyrics look a bit corny, but the music and obvious passion lift them." The New York Times determined that "the music has a newfound toughness, with clanging guitars and explosive drums."

== Track listing ==
All songs written by Scott Kempner, except "Drug Deal" written by the Del-Lords.

Side one
No.	Title	Length
1.	"Heaven"	2:58
2.	"Love Lies Dying"	5:50
3.	"Drug Deal"	3:34
4.	"Soldier's Home"	5:34
5.	"Saint Jake"	5:23

Side two
No.	Title	Length
1.	"Dream Come True"	5:00
2.	"True Love"	3:46
3.	"Everlovin'"	5:41
4.	"Against My Will"	4:48
5.	"No Waitress No More"	3:07

CD Version
No.	Title	Length
1.	"Heaven"	3:02
2.	"Love Lies Dying"	5:55
3.	"Drug Deal"	3:37
4.	"Soldier's Home"	5:41
5.	"Saint Jake"	5:28
6.	"Dream Come True"	5:08
7.	"True Love"	3:50
8.	"Everlovin'"	5:45
9.	"Against My Will"	4:53
10.	"No Waitress No More"	3:21
11.	"Some Summer"	2:52
12.	"Obsessed with Mary"	4:54
13.	"Mickey Paid for What Mickey Done"	4:09
14.	"St. Jake"	4:48
15.	"True Love"	4:06

== Personnel ==
The Del-Lords

- Scott Kempner – lead vocals, guitar
- Eric Ambel – guitar, vocals
- Manny Caiati – bass guitar, vocals
- Frank Funaro – drums, vocals

Additional musicians and production

- Lenny Castro – percussion
- Scott Church – assistant engineering
- David Eaton – assistant engineering
- Michael Frondelli – engineering, mixing
- Neil Geraldo – production, mixing
- Dave Hernandez – assistant engineering
- George Marino – mastering
- Jenine Saccente – photography
- Brian Scheuble – assistant engineering
- George Tutko – engineering
- Mark Wilczak – assistant engineering
