= Kasey Anderson =

American singer-songwriter

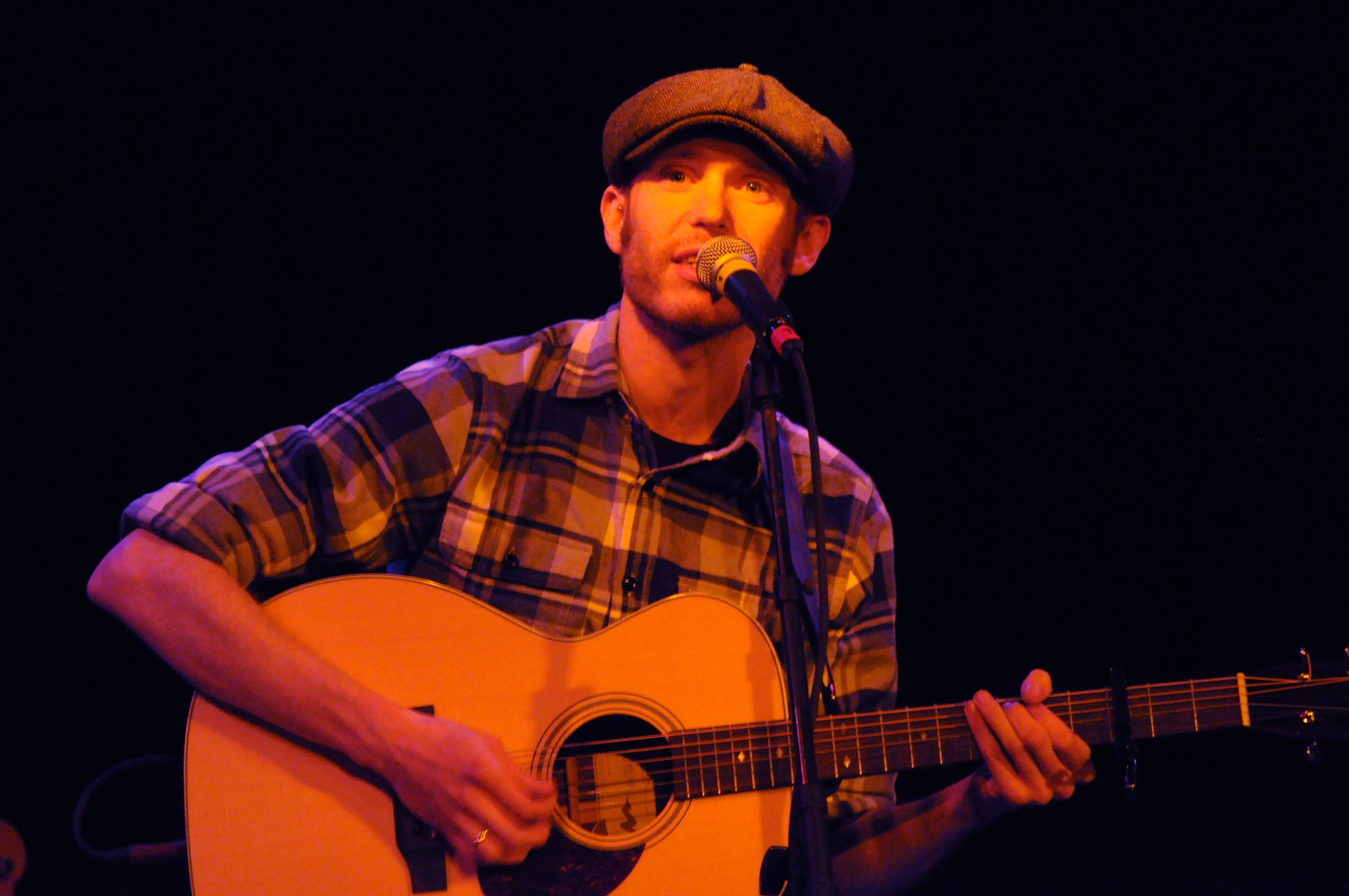
- Kasey Anderson

Background information
- Born: Kasey E. Anderson; 1979 (age 46–47); Portland, Oregon, U.S.
- Genres: Alternative country; alternative rock
- Occupations: Singer-songwriter; musician
- Instruments: Electric guitar; acoustic guitar; harmonica; vocals
- Years active: 2001–2012; 2018-present
- Labels: Terra Soul Records, Red River Records, Jullian Records
- Website: kaseyandersonmusic.com

Kasey Anderson (born 1979) is an American singer, songwriter, guitarist, producer and musician who has released six albums—three as a solo artist, two with his band the Honkies, and one with his band Hawks and Doves. Anderson was diagnosed as bipolar in 2012 and entered intensive outpatient treatment the same year. In August 2013 Anderson pleaded guilty to federal wire fraud charges and was sentenced to four years in prison. He served two years in prison and was released in April 2016. Anderson's band, Hawks and Doves, released their debut album, From a White Hotel, in 2018.

== History ==
Anderson was born in Portland, Oregon and moved to Bellingham, Washington when he was 18. He variously lived and worked in Seattle, New York, and Los Angeles. When he was active, he was based in the American North Pacific Coast. As both a solo act and as front man for The Honkies, Anderson toured with Jason Isbell, Counting Crows, Steve Earle, the Supersuckers, and others. Counting Crows recorded a cover of Anderson's song "Like Teenage Gravity" on their 2012 album Underwater Sunshine. Anderson's music has been described as Americana and alt-country and lauded by No Depression, Paste, The Onion AV Club and the Pazz & Jop Critics poll. Musical influences include Chuck Berry, The Rolling Stones, Bo Diddley, The Faces, The New York Dolls, The Replacements, Bob Dylan, and Goodie Mob.

In late 2012, Anderson was diagnosed with Type 1 Bipolar Disorder and entered an intensive outpatient treatment program for alcohol and cocaine addiction.

== Federal wire fraud indictment ==
On January 28, 2013, Kasey Anderson was indicted in the United States District Court for the Western District of Washington on five counts of wire fraud. Among the charges were allegations that Anderson engaged in a scheme to defraud investors by falsely informing them he intended to produce a benefit album and host a benefit concert in support of the West Memphis Three. The indictment also alleged Anderson falsified emails from Jon Landau, Bruce Springsteen's manager, as part of the effort to defraud the investors. On August 21, 2013, Anderson pleaded guilty to the federal wire fraud charges. On July 23, 2014, he was sentenced to four years in prison by U.S. District Judge Ronald B. Leighton.

== The Honkies ==
The Honkies were formed in 2010 by Kasey Anderson and Andrew McKeag, the guitarist for the band The Presidents of the United States of America. The Honkies lineup included:

- Kasey Anderson (vocals, guitar, percussion)
- Andrew McKeag (guitar, vocals)
- Eric Corson (bass)
- Will Moore (bass)
- Ty Bailie (keyboard)
- Mike Musburger (drums)

== Hawks and Doves ==
Hawks and Doves were formed in 2016 by Kasey Anderson, Ben Landsverk, and Jesse Moffat. Their debut album, From a White Hotel, was released July 27, 2018 on Jullian Records and features guest performances by Eric Ambel, Kurt Bloch, Ralph Carney, Kay Hanley and Andrew McKeag.

== Discography ==
Kasey Anderson released three solo recordings as well as two with his group the Honkies. Let the Bloody Moon Rise was not distributed via retail outlets but instead was made available by Kasey Anderson for download from the internet for a 72 hours period in October 2012.

=== Solo recordings ===
- Dead Roses (2004)
- Reckoning (2007)
- Nowhere Nights (2010)
- Daytrotter Sessions (2021)
- To the Places We Lived (upcoming)

=== With the Honkies ===
- Heart of a Dog (2011)
- Let the Bloody Moon Rise (2012)

=== With Hawks and Doves ===
- From a White Hotel (2018)
