= Total Destruction to Your Mind =

Studio album by Swamp Dogg
- Released: 1970
- Label: Canyon
- Producers: Jerry Williams, Jr.

Swamp Dogg chronology
Total Destruction to Your Mind (1970)	Rat On! (1971)

Total Destruction to Your Mind is the debut album by the American musician Swamp Dogg (Jerry Williams, Jr.), released in 1970. It is considered to be a cult album, a classic, and a neglected masterpiece. It was rereleased in 2013, along with 1971's Rat On!

Some of its songs have been recorded by other musicians, including Jimmy Cliff, Eric Ambel, and the Isley Brothers with Santana. Total Destruction to Your Mind was among the albums that inspired Ben Greenman's novel Please Step Back; after emailing with Greenman, Swamp Dogg recorded a song that used the protagonist's lyrics.

Total Destruction to Your Mind had sold more than 500,000 copies by 1992.

== Production ==
After years as a minor, and conventional, songwriter and singer, Williams adopted the Swamp Dogg persona due to disgust with the music industry, and in order to write about more personal topics; the inspiration came to him while looking through old Atlantic albums in Tom Dowd's office. Total Destruction to Your Mind is regarded as an attempt to combine the rock music of the late 1960s with Stax Records-esque soul music, as well as protest with comedy.

Recorded at Capricorn Studios, in Macon, Georgia, the album was produced by Williams. Swamp Dogg later claimed to have recorded some of the songs after ingesting LSD. "Mama's Baby, Daddy's Maybe" is about taking a paternity test. The title track references "I Am the Walrus"; "The World Beyond" was written by Bobby Goldsboro.

== Critical reception ==
Professional ratings
Review scores
Source	Rating
AllMusic	4.5/5 stars
The Encyclopedia of Popular Music	4/5 stars

AllMusic concluded that "perhaps Dogg's obsession with drugs, sleazy sex, and cultural satire kept the album from being embraced by soul fans, and this genuinely odd blend also keeps Swamp Dogg's debut from blowing the minds of latter-day listeners, at least upon the first listen." The New Yorker labeled Total Destruction to Your Mind "a crazed, brilliant blast of protest soul that compared favorably with the best work of Sly Stone, Curtis Mayfield, and Funkadelic." The New York Times determined that it is "a soul album that, from its first hard, wild groove, announces itself as a classic."

Robert Christgau, in 1992, deemed the album "in-your-face black rock." In 2018, Pitchfork called it "an irreverent, rollicking spin on the southern soul music of Muscle Shoals Sound Studio." Reviewing the 2013 rerelease, The Sunday Times called Swamp Dogg "the missing link between Otis Redding and Frank Zappa."

== Track listing ==
All tracks written by Jerry Williams, Jr., unless otherwise noted.

Side one

1. "Total Destruction to Your Mind" – 3:24
2. "Synthetic World" – 3:23
3. "Dust Your Head Color Red" – (Jerry Williams, Jr., Gary Bonds) – 2:48
4. "Redneck" – (Joe South) – 2:47
5. "If I Die Tomorrow (I've Lived Tonight)" – 2:50
6. "I Was Born Blue" – (Jerry Williams, Jr., Dee Erwin) – 2:58

Side two

1. "Sal-A-Faster" – 2:48
2. "The World Beyond" – (Bobby Goldsboro) – 3:39
3. "These Are Not My People" – (Joe South) – 2:36
4. "Everything You'll Ever Need" – (Jerry Williams, Jr., Gary Bonds) – 2:51
5. "The Baby Is Mine" – 2:48
6. "Mama's Baby, Daddy's Maybe" – (Jerry Williams, Jr., Gary Bonds) – 4:08

== Personnel ==
- Jerry Williams, Jr. – lead vocals, piano, arrangements, production
- Jackie Avery Singers – backing vocals
- The Maconites – horns
- Jesse "Beaver" Carr – guitars
- Paul "Berry" Hornsby – organ, piano
- Robert "Pop" Popwell – bass
- Johnny "Duck" Sendlin – drums
