= Frontier Days (album) =

Studio album by The Del-Lords
- Released: 1984
- Genre: Roots rock, rock and roll
- Label: EMI America
- Producer: The Del-Lords, Lou Whitney

The Del-Lords chronology
Frontier Days (1984)	Johnny Comes Marching Home (1986)

Professional ratings
Review scores
Source	Rating
Allmusic	3.5/5 stars
Robert Christgau	A−

Frontier Days is the debut album released in 1984 by The Del-Lords on EMI America Records.

== Track listing ==
All songs written by Scott Kempner, except "How Can a Poor Man Stand Such Times and Live?" by Alfred Reed

Side one
No.	Title	Length
1.	"How Can a Poor Man Stand Such Times and Live?"	3:02
2.	"Get Tough"	4:13
3.	"Livin' on Love"	4:14
4.	"Double Life"	4:40
5.	"I Play the Drums"	3:37

Side two
No.	Title	Length
1.	"Burnin' in the Flame of Love"	3:45
2.	"Pledge of Love"	2:59
3.	"Shame on You"	3:45
4.	"Mercenary"	5:27
5.	"Feel Like Going Home"	4:28

CD Version
No.	Title	Length
1.	"How Can a Poor Man Stand Such Times and Live?"	3:08
2.	"Get Tough"	4:16
3.	"Livin' on Love"	4:19
4.	"Double Life"	4:46
5.	"I Play the Drums"	3:42
6.	"Burnin' in the Flame of Love"	3:50
7.	"Pledge of Love"	3:03
8.	"Shame on You"	3:49
9.	"Mercenary"	5:33
10.	"Feel Like Going Home"	4:32
11.	"Wastin' Time Talkin'"	2:34
12.	"Love Among the Ruins"	3:20
13.	"Shame on You"	3:39
14.	"Love on Fire"	3:19
15.	"Heaven"	3:01

== Personnel ==
The Del-Lords

- Scott Kempner – lead vocals, guitar
- Eric Ambel – guitar, vocals
- Manny Caiati – bass guitar, vocals
- Frank Funaro – drums, vocals

Additional musicians and production

- Warren Bruleigh – engineering
- The Del-Lords – production
- James Hamilton – photography
- Michael Hodgson – design
- Scott James – engineering
- Bob Ludwig – mastering
- Terry Manning – mixing
- Henry Marquez – art direction
- Bob Richey – illustrations
- Jon Smith – engineering
- Lou Whitney – production
