= The Del-Lords =

American rock and roll band

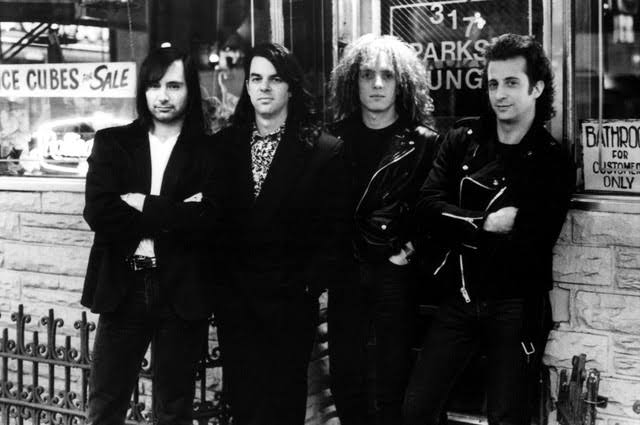
- The four original members of The Del-Lords

Background information
- Origin: Bronx, New York, United States
- Genres: Roots rock, Rock and roll, cowpunk
- Years active: 1982–1990, 2008–present
- Labels: Enigma, EMI America, Restless, Megaforce
- Members: Eric "Roscoe" Ambel; Frank Funaro; Steve Almaas
- Past members: Manny Caiati; Scott Kempner
- Website: del-lords.com

The Del-Lords are an American rock and roll band that formed in New York City in 1982, founded by The Dictators' guitarist Scott Kempner. The band combined elements of 1960s garage rock with country, blues and folk influences to become one of the early originators of urban, roots-rock. The band members were Scott Kempner, Manny Caiati, Eric Ambel and Frank Funaro.

== History ==
Modeled on British bands of the 1960s that used several singers – The Kinks, Beatles, The Who - Kempner's vision was to create an act featuring four singers, that some said was like an "East Coast Beach Boys".

The band took its name from Del Lord, director of many early Three Stooges shorts. The four Del-Lords studio albums, released between 1984 and 1990 – Frontier Days, Johnny Comes Marching Home, Based on a True Story and Lovers Who Wander – were released on CD in 2008 by the American Beat label.

Twenty-six years after they began, The Del-Lords began work on new recordings. They released their work in progress, Under Construction EP of rough mixes on their website on March 9, 2010. Their first four albums were re-released by Collector’s Choice-American Beat with bonus tracks and expanded liner notes.

In February 2010, The Del-Lords played their first live gigs in 20 years, starting with two unannounced gigs in the northeast US. They played a house concert in Rhode Island, and a sneak show at the Lakeside Lounge in New York before embarking on a seven city tour of Spain.

On May 14, 2013, Elvis Club, a new album, was released on the GB Music label.

== Discography ==
=== Studio albums ===
- Frontier Days (1984, EMI America)
- Johnny Comes Marching Home (1986, EMI America)
- Based on a True Story (1988, Enigma)
- Lovers Who Wander (1990, Enigma)
- Elvis Club (2013, GB Music)

=== EPs ===
- Under Construction (2010)

=== Compilation albums ===
- Get Tough: The Best of the Del-Lords (1999, Restless)

=== Live albums ===
- Howlin' at the Halloween Moon (1989, Restless)

=== Singles ===
- "Get Tough" / "Pledge of Love" (1985, EMI America)
- "How Can a Poor Man Stand Such Times and Live" (1985, EMI America)
- "Get Tough" (1986, EMI America)
- "True Love" (1986, EMI America)
- "Soldier's Home" (1986, EMI America)
- "Heaven" (1986, EMI America)
- "Cheyenne" (1989, Enigma)
- "Poem of the River" (1989, Enigma)
