= Scott Kempner =

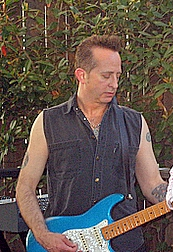
- Kempner in 2006

Background information
- Born: February 6, 1954; The Bronx, New York City, U.S.
- Died: November 29, 2023 (aged 69) Connecticut, U.S.
- Instrument: Guitar
- Years active: 1972–2021
- Formerly of: The Brandos; The Del-Lords; The Dictators
- Spouse: Sharon Ludtke

Scott "Top Ten" Kempner (February 6, 1954 – November 29, 2023) was an American rock musician who was the rhythm guitarist of The Dictators. He was also a founding member of The Del-Lords and later a member of The Brandos.

== Background and career ==
Kempner was born in the Bronx on February 6, 1954. He began his musical career in 1972, with friends Andy Shernoff and Ross Friedman, when they started The Dictators. The band broke up for the first time in 1975, though they frequently reunited over the following decades, and Kempner continued to play with them until his retirement in 2021.

Kempner released a solo in 1992 called Tenement Angels. He released his second solo album, Saving Grace, in July 2008 on 00:02:59 Records.

In the early 1990s, Dion DiMucci joined Kempner and Frank Funaro of the Del-Lords and Mike Mesaros of the Smithereens in a short-lived band called Little Kings. A live album was later released, but not widely circulated or promoted.

Kempner contributed "Apache Tears" to the 2007 compilation album Song of America.

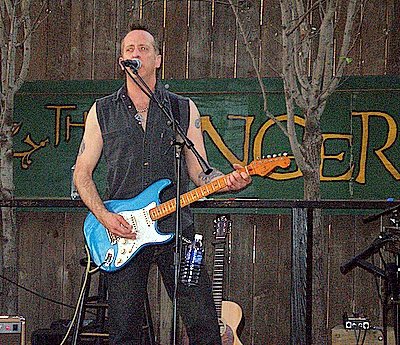
Kempner singing in 2006

In summer 2008, Variety said about Kempner: "If the world were a just and fair place, Scott Kempner would be stopped regularly by musicians and music fans thanking him for the effect the records he made with the Del-Lords and the Dictators had on their lives. Kempner's music is impossible to not like: He's the rare master at making three-chord rock 'n' roll - inspired by the 1950s and '60s - sound fresh and vital, simultaneously urban and twangy, heartfelt, political and personal."

A Del-Lords reunion album and tour were done in 2013, and Kempner sang and played guitar on the Carla Olson album Have Harmony Will Travel, performing Little Steven's "All I Needed Was You".

== Personal life and death ==
Kempner was married to Sharon Ludtke. He retired from his musical career in 2021, after being diagnosed with dementia, and died at a nursing home in Connecticut on November 29, 2023, at the age of 69.
