= Bechly =

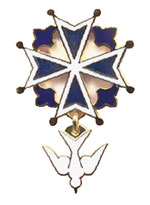

Bechly is a surname.

The Bechly surname has its roots in Uckermark District, Brandenburg, Germany. The oldest known individual with the surname was Heinrich Bechly, born August 19, 1640.

Prior to this the family name was Bechli, and they lived in Uresbach, Switzerland, near the French border. The oldest known individual from this line was Uli Bechli, born January 4, 1613.

The family resettled in the Uckermark as a response to the Edict of Potsdam issued by Frederick William, Elector of Brandenburg. Frederick William allowed the Huguenots to escape religious persecution that resulted from the Edict of Fontainebleau issued by King Louis XIV of France in October 1685. Upon arrival in the Uckermark, the family name was revised from Bechli to Bechly. The National Huguenot Society has listed Michael Bechly / Bechli (1672–1743) as a Qualified Huguenot Ancestor.

A branch of the Bechly family emigrated to the United States in 1852 on the Hamburg barque Elise. Two different branches of the Bechly family emigrated to Queensland, Australia. The first in 1871 on the ship Lammershagen, and the second in 1879 on the ship Fritz Reuter.

Historical records of the Bechly family in Germany are maintained at the French Church of Friedrichstadt in Berlin, Germany. These records helped to establish the historical lineage and interconnection of the different branches of the family.

== Notable people ==
Notable people with the surname Bechly include:

- Cary Ann Bechly (1914–2000), Chicago attorney that co-founded the Women's Bar Foundation of Illinois
- Edward Bechly (1874–1945), editor, publisher, and proprietor of the Iroquois County Times-Democrat
- Ernst Bechly (1872–1954), surveyor and map maker
- Franklin Bechly (1873–1965), Iowa 6th District judge from 1927 to 1959
- Fred Bechly (1924–2004), electrical engineer and inventor in the field of color television broadcasting
- Freiderich August Bechly (1835–1916), apiologist and correspondent for the American Bee Journal
- Freidrich Bechly, co-owner of the Janssen and Bechly Brewery, Neubrandenburg, Germany
- Friedrich Johann Bechly (1807–1892), Bechly family patriarch in America
- Gerhard Bechly (1898–1968), lieutenant colonel in the German Army that co-founded the League of German Officers as part of the German resistance to Nazism movement
- Hans Bechly (1871–1954), German labor leader and trade unionist
- Hephzibah Dumville Bechly (1833–1869), writer about life for common women in the antebellum Midwest

== In popular culture ==
Julius Bechly, from the fictional drama series Sisters (Australian TV series), is a Nobel Prize laureate and reproductive scientist who creates a complicated situation for his daughter Julia Bechly.
