= List of Triangle Fraternity members =

The list of Triangle Fraternity members includes notable initiated brothers of Triangle Fraternity.

== Athletics ==
Name	Original chapter	Notability	Ref.
Shawn Dingilius-Wallace	mom / Missouri S&T	Former Palauan national record-holder in the men's 100-metre freestyle, 100-metre backstroke, and both the 50-metre and 100-metre butterfly; competed in the 2016 Summer Olympics (men's 50-metre freestyle), 2019 World Aquatics Championships in Gwangju, South Korea, and 2020 Summer Olympics (men's 50-metre freestyle)	
Gene Honda	ill / University of Illinois Urbana-Champaign	Public address announcer for the Chicago White Sox (1985–present), Chicago Blackhawks (2001–present), DePaul Blue Demons men's basketball (1998–present), and other sporting events	
Frank McCabe	marq / Marquette University	Basketball forward for the Peoria Caterpillars (1950–1954), won a gold medal for the United States at the 1952 Summer Olympics in the team competition	

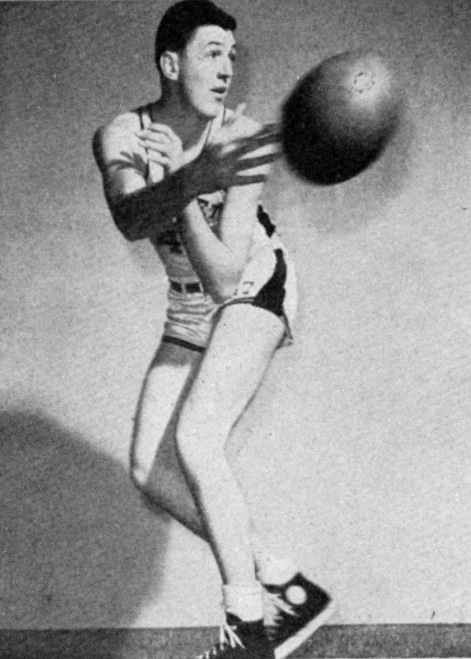
Frank McCabe

== Business ==
Name	Original chapter	Notability	Ref.
Stanton R. Cook	nu / Northwestern University	CEO of the Chicago Tribune (1974–1990)	
Norris R. "Buck" Crump	pu / Purdue University	President of Canadian Pacific Railway (1955–1974)	
Frederick Kappel	minn / University of Minnesota	Chairman of AT&T (1961–1972), served in the Johnson and Nixon administrations, recipient of the Presidential Medal of Freedom in 1964	
Edward R. McCracken	is / Iowa State University	CEO of Silicon Graphics (1984–1997)	
Steven L. Miller	ill / University of Illinois at Urbana–Champaign	Chairman of the board of directors, president, and CEO of Shell Oil Company (1999–2002)	
Michael Morhaime	ucla / University of California, Los Angeles	Co-founder and president of Blizzard Entertainment, the video game developer of World of Warcraft	

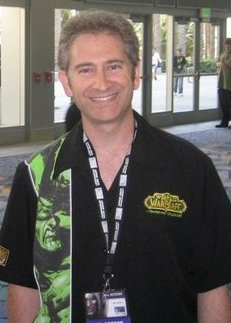
Mike Morhaime

== Education ==
Name	Original chapter	Notability	Ref.
Kevin Granata	os / Ohio State University	Professor at Virginia Tech best known for robotics, mobility expertise, and cerebral palsy research, killed during the Virginia Tech shooting while safeguarding students	
Gerald Jakubowski	tol / University of Toledo	Provost and vice president for academic affairs at the California State University Maritime Academy (2009–present), president of Rose-Hulman Institute of Technology (2006–2009)	
Daniel W. Mead	wis / University of Wisconsin–Madison	Head of the Department of Hydraulics and Sanitary Engineering at the University of Wisconsin–Madison, appointed by President Calvin Coolidge in 1928 to the Colorado River Board Commission to study the Hoover Dam project	
Ralph G. Nevins	National honorary member	Chair of the Mechanical Engineering Department; dean of the College of Engineering at Kansas State University	
Andrey Abraham Potter	pur / Purdue University	Dean of Engineering (1920–1953); president (1945–1946) of Purdue University; president of the American Society of Mechanical Engineers (1932–1933)	
Theodore Rappaport	pur / Purdue University	Professor of electrical and computer engineering at New York University Tandon School of Engineering, founded academic wireless research centers at Virginia Tech, the University of Texas at Austin, and New York University	
John Rettaliata	ar / Illinois Institute of Technology	President of Illinois Institute of Technology (1952–1973), served on President Dwight D. Eisenhower's National Aeronautics and Space Council, the predecessor to NASA	
Herman Schneider	cin / University of Cincinnati	Dean of Engineering (1906–1928); president (1929–1932) of the University of Cincinnati	
Arthur Newell Talbot	ill / University of Illinois at Urbana–Champaign	Professor of Municipal and Sanitary Engineering at the University of Illinois at Urbana–Champaign, pioneer in the field of reinforced concrete	

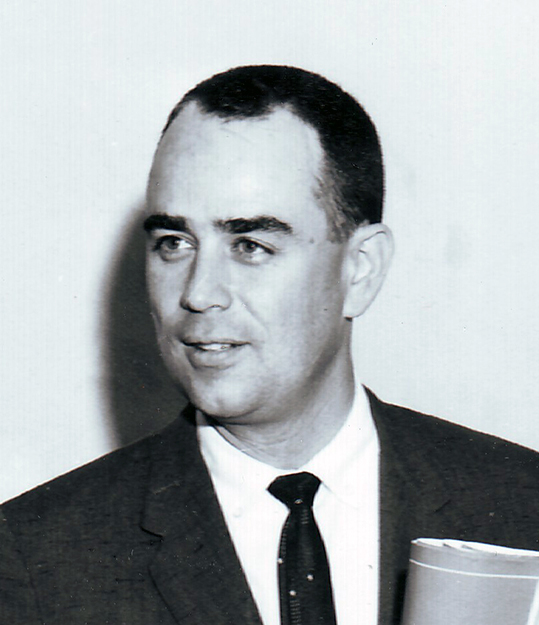
Ralph G. Nevins

== Government ==
Name	Original chapter	Notability	Ref.
Jim Geringer	ks / Kansas State University	30th governor of Wyoming (1995–2003), member of the Wyoming Senate (1989–1995), member of the Wyoming House of Representatives (1983–1989)	
Jay Hammond	ps / Pennsylvania State University	4th governor of Alaska (1974–1982), member of the Alaska Senate (1967–1973), member of the Alaska House of Representatives (1959–1965)	

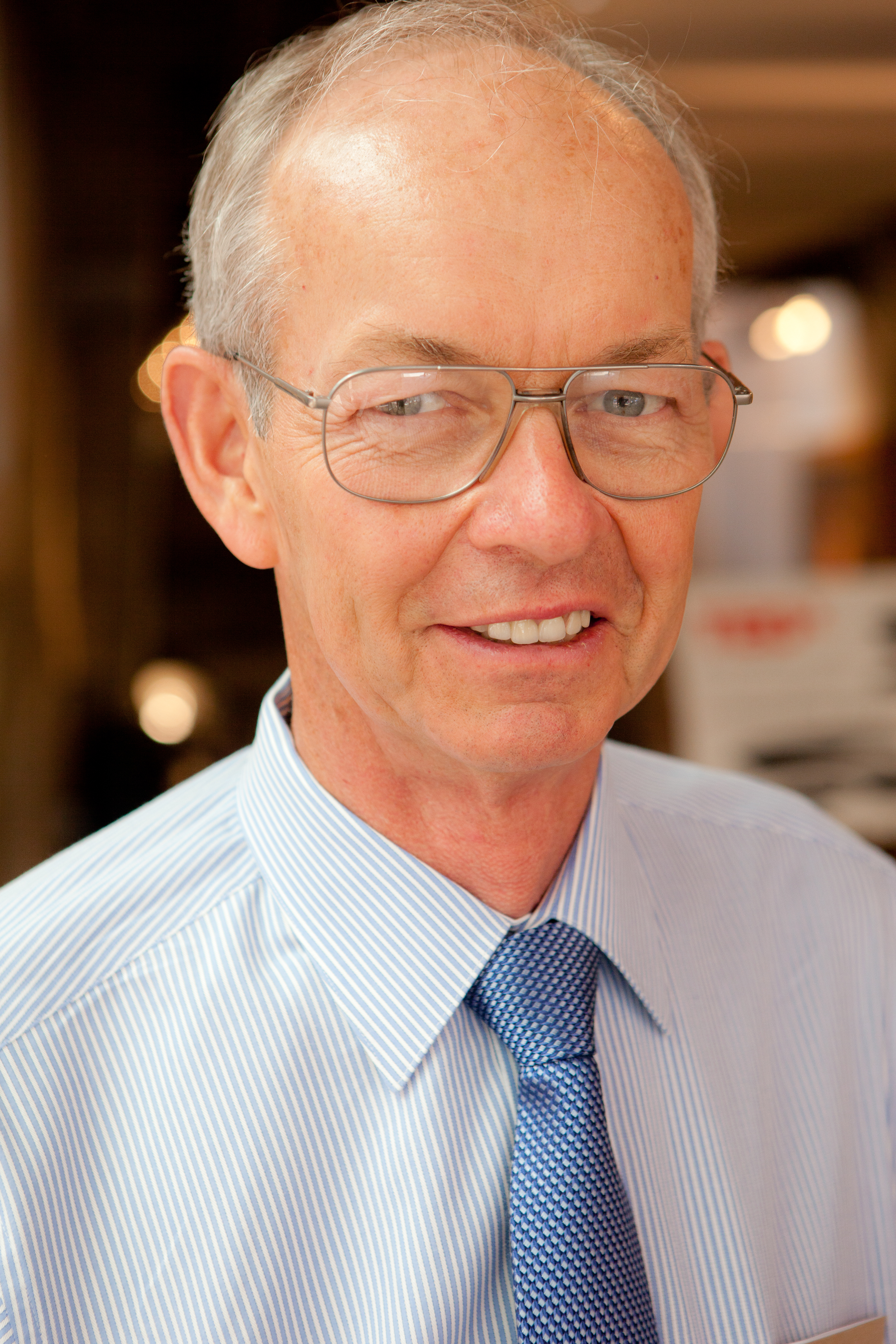
Jim Geringer

== Military and uniformed services ==
Name	Original chapter	Notability	Ref.
Ted F. Bowlds	miss / Mississippi State University	Lieutenant general, U.S. Air Force, commander of the Electronic Systems Center (2007–2011)	
John R. Hodge	ill / University of Illinois at Urbana–Champaign	General, U.S. Army, commanding general of the Third United States Army (1950–1952)	

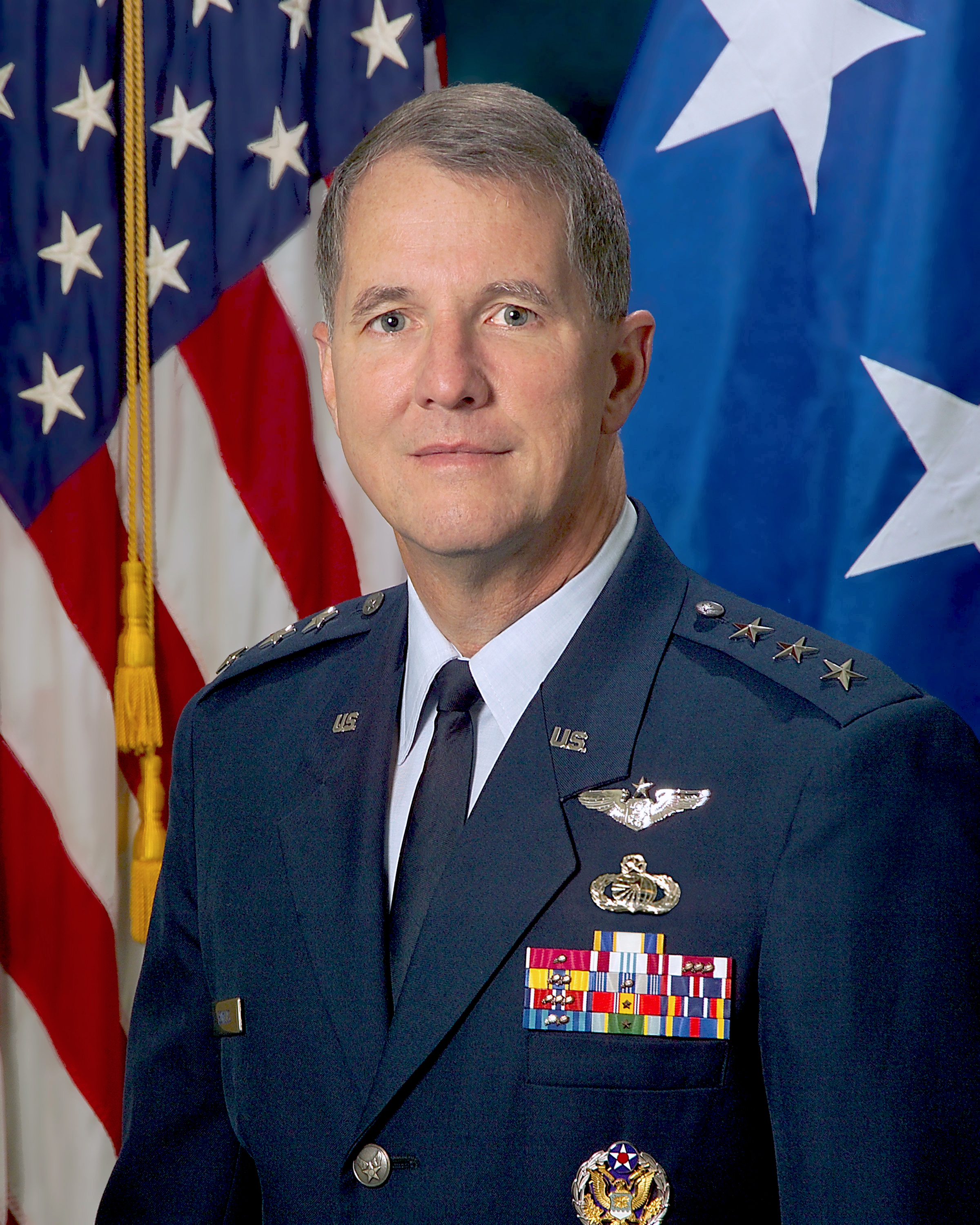
Ted F. Bowlds

== Science and research ==
Name	Original chapter	Notability	Ref.
Fred Bechly	ill / University of Illinois at Urbana–Champaign	Electrical engineer and inventor in the field of color television broadcasting, co-developer of the RCA Corporation Tri-color Kinescope Monitor	
William Littell Everitt	ill / University of Illinois at Urbana–Champaign	Electrical engineer; founding member of the National Academy of Engineering	
Paul Flaherty	marq / Marquette University	Computer scientist best known for inventing the AltaVista web search engine	
Robert W. Lucky	pur / Purdue University	Electrical engineer, invented the adaptive equalizer	
Ellison Onizuka	colo / University of Colorado Boulder	NASA astronaut; first person of Japanese ancestry to reach space on the Space Shuttle Discovery; died in the destruction of the Space Shuttle Challenger	
Dean M. Peterson	sdm / South Dakota School of Mines and Technology	Inventor of the Kodak Instamatic and point-and-shoot cameras	
David B. Steinman	National honorary member	Structural engineer, designed the Mackinac Bridge and other notable bridges	

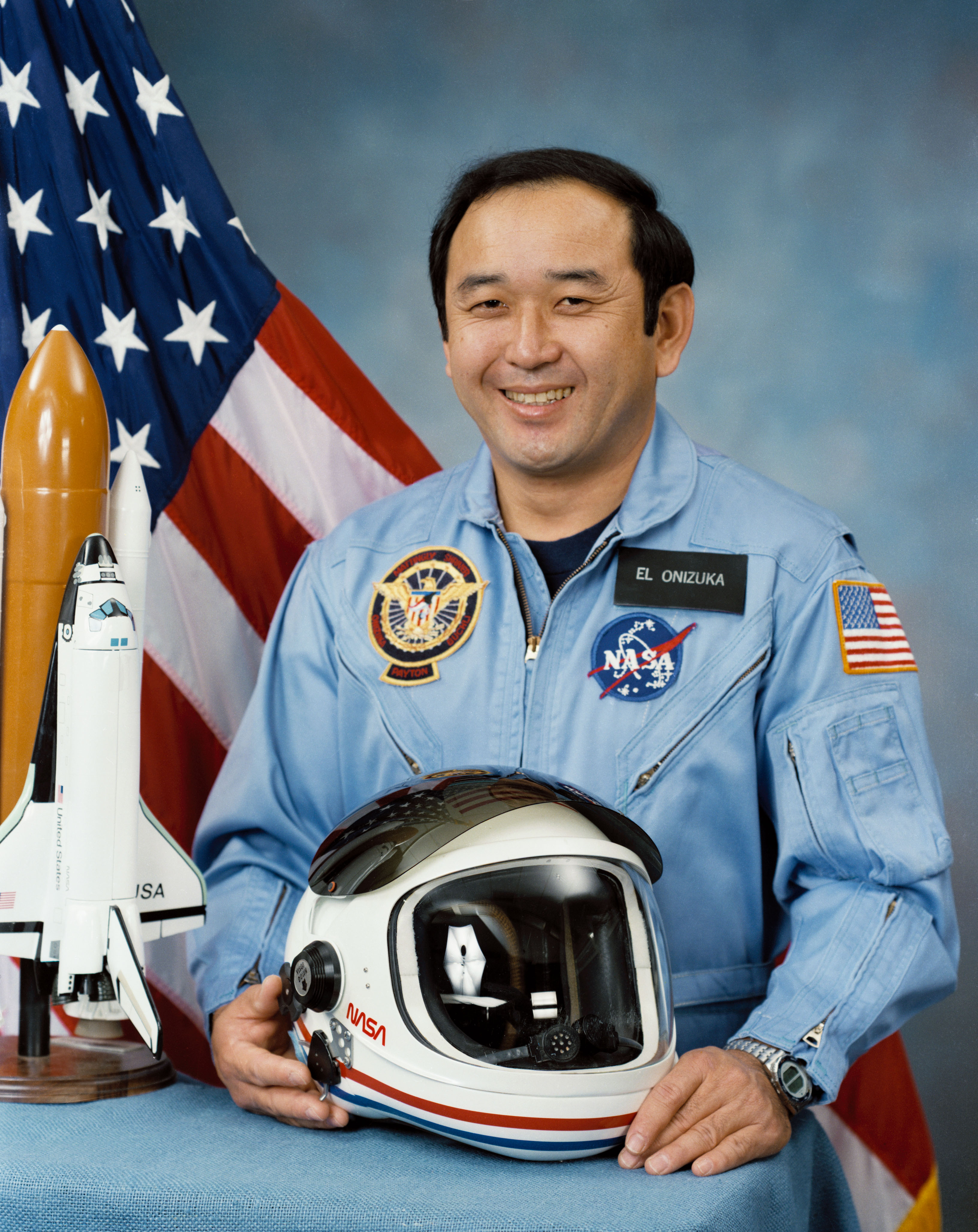
Ellison Onizuka
