= Edward Bechly =

American editor

- Edward Bechly
- Born: March 23, 1874; Searsboro, Iowa, US
- Died: August 31, 1945 (aged 71); Urbana, Illinois, US
- Other names: Beckly, Bechley
- Occupation(s): Journalist, editor, publisher, proprietor
- Spouse: Ferne Smiley
- Children: 3

Edward Bechly (March 3, 1874 – August 31, 1945) was an American editor, publisher, and proprietor of the Iroquois County Times-Democrat.

== Family ==
Edward Bechly (sometimes spelled Beckly or Bechley) was the second son of Freiderich August Bechly (1835–1916) and Lydia Marie Weesner (1850–1899). His older brother Franklin Bechly was appointed 6th District Judge in 1927 by Iowa Governor Hammill. Edward married Ferne Smiley (1887–1968) in 1912 and they had three children while living in Watseka, Illinois.

== Adventurer ==
"Captain" Bechly rafted the homemade houseboat "Ruin No. 13" down the Missouri and Mississippi River systems. Starting point in November 1907 with his first mate, Charles Bateman, was Sioux City, Iowa. The journey continued past St. Louis onto the Mississippi. The original destination was New Orleans, but the voyage ended in March 1908 near Memphis when Bechly learned via forwarded mail that a reporter job was waiting for him in Chicago. The sale of the boat generated funds sufficient to cover transportation expenses back to Chicago. The trip lasted four months and extended nearly 900 miles.

== Career ==
After graduating with a Bachelor of Philosophy from Iowa State University, Bechly worked as a reporter for several local Midwest newspapers including The Muscatine Journal, the St. Joseph Gazette, the Des Moines Capital, the Des Moines Daily News, the Sioux City Tribune; and Chicago newspapers the Inter-Ocean, the Record-Herald, and the Chicago Tribune. While in Watseka, Illinois during March 1910, he accepted an opportunity to become editor of the Iroquois County Times-Democrat. Following his marriage to Ferne in 1912, he purchased the Times-Democrat and became its publisher.

== Role in Ray Lamphere confession ==
In his 16-page narrative "Lanphere's Confession", using the pen name Edward Beckly, the author recounts his secret assignment from Walter Howey, City Editor of the Chicago Tribune to travel to Mount Pleasant, Iowa to meet with Iowa Wesleyan University president Edwin A Schell. His objective was to obtain exclusive access, for the Chicago Tribune, to the signed confession of Ray Lamphere who was central to the famous Belle Gunness serial murderer case. In 1908 farm hand Ray Lamphere was charged with murder and arson for the burning of the Gunness farm house, and on November 26, he was sentenced to a 20-year term at the Indiana State Prison in Michigan City, Indiana. While in prison, Lamphere called for Reverend Edwin Schell who was then minister of the Methodist church of LaPorte, Indiana. Realizing the importance, Reverend Schell recorded Lamphere's verbal confession on paper, had him sign it, and then sealed it and locked it in his personal safe. Ray Lamphere subsequently died in prison on December 30, 1909.

Reporter Beckly took the first available train to Mount Pleasant, Iowa to meet with Edwin Schell. In the president's office, he tried to convey why it was vitally important to release the information held within the confession of Ray Lamphere. President Schell's counter argument was that a confession made to a minister is a sacred and privileged communication, and that the document must remain in safekeeping. With that said the meeting ended, but the president asked Beckly to return after lunch to meet again. When Beckly returned Schell informed him that he had sent a telegram to Bishop William Fraser McDowell requesting guidance on the matter, and to stay local until the response arrived. The following day the telegram response from the Bishop was to 'use personal judgement'. President Schell called for Beckly and agreed to provide the confession document which was locked in his safe at home. At the president's residence, Schell's wife became aware of the purpose of the visit and refused to allow the document to be released stating that 'this would not be right with the church'. Reporter Beckly took the first available train back to Chicago empty-handed.

The following Thursday (January 13, 1910), the St. Louis Post-Dispatch issued a feature story regarding the Gunness Farm murders, and offered speculation regarding the confession of Ray Lamphere. City Editor Howey sent reporter Beckly back to Mount Pleasant to try again with President Schell. In the president's office, Schell was more receptive to using the confession as a way to clear the nationwide speculation that was causing strain for the family members of the victims, but he still feared bringing discredit to the Methodist Church. Schell asked Beckly to meet him later in the day at his residence. At that meeting, reporter Beckly was presented with two envelopes. The first contained the signed and sealed confession of Ray Lamphere. The second contained a statement from Edwin Schell as to why the confession was being released, which was to be published at the same time. Beckly wired the story to the Tribune at his first opportunity, and the return telegram came from Chicago Tribune legend, James Keeley, with the simple message "Good work".

The Chicago Tribune subsequently published the feature story about Lamphere's confession, including President Schell's statement, on January 15, 1910.

== Notability ==
Edward Bechly gained notability early in his career as the Chicago Tribune reporter that broke the story of Ray Lamphere's confession in the famous Belle Gunness case.

He gained regional notability as owner and publisher of the Iroquois County Times-Democrat from 1912 to about 1923.

He was also appointed representative of the 10th District of Indiana for the 1924 Presidential Electoral College.
