= Reetz =

Reetz may refer to:

- Gülitz-Reetz, municipality in Brandenburg, Germany
- Recz, Poland
- Reetz, a village in the municipality of Wiesenburg, Germany
- Willy Reetz (1892–1963), German painter
- Manfred T. Reetz (1943–2026), German chemist and academic
- Harold Reetz (born 1948), American agronomist
- Jakson Reetz (born 1996), American baseball player
