= Dumville =

Dumville is a surname. Notable people with the surname include:

- Bush Dumville (born 1945), Canadian politician
- David Dumville (born 1949), British medievalist and Celtic scholar
- Hephzibah Dumville (1833–1869), writer about life for common women in the antebellum Midwest
