= Belle Gunness =

Norwegian-American serial killer

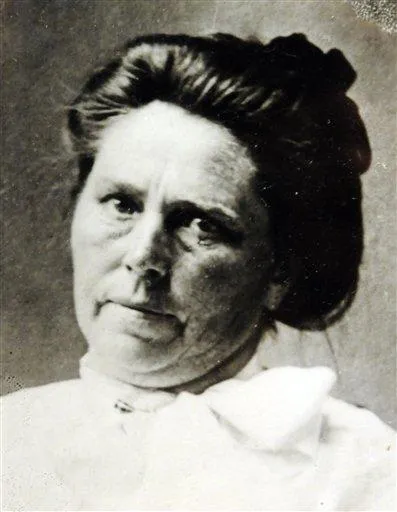
- Gunness, c. 1904
- Born: Bella Paulsdatter or Brynhild Paulsdatter Størset; November 11, 1859; Selbu, Søndre Trondhjem, Norway
- Died: April 28, 1908 (aged 48) (unverified); La Porte, Indiana, U.S.
- Motive: Monetary gain

Details
- Victims: 14+
- Span of crimes: 1884–1908
- States: Illinois, Indiana
- Date apprehended: N/A

Belle Gunness (born Brynhild Paulsdatter Størseth; November 11, 1859 – possibly April 28, 1908), nicknamed Hell's Belle, was a Norwegian-American serial killer who was active in Illinois and Indiana between 1884 and 1908. Gunness is thought to have killed at least fourteen people (most of whom were men she enticed to visit her rural Indiana property through personal advertisements), while some sources speculate her involvement in as many as forty murders, making her one of the most prolific female serial killers in history. Gunness seemingly died in a fire in 1908, although her actual fate is unconfirmed.

== Early life ==
Belle Gunness was born Brynhild Paulsdatter Størseth in Selbu Municipality in Søndre Trondhjem county, Norway, on November 11, 1859, to Paul and Berit Størseth; she was the youngest of eight children. She was confirmed at the Church of Norway in 1874. At age 14, Gunness began working for neighboring farms by milking and herding cattle to save enough money for the journey to New York City. She moved to the United States in 1881.

When she was processed by immigration at Castle Garden, her first name was recorded as Belle on the passenger list. She then travelled to Chicago to join her sister, Nellie, who had immigrated several years earlier. In Chicago, while living with her sister and brother-in-law, Gunness worked as a domestic servant, then got a job at a butcher's shop cutting up animal carcasses. She was at least 170 centimetres (5 ft 7 in) tall and weighed around 95–113 kilograms (209–249 lb) and was physically strong in appearance.

== Deaths associated with Gunness ==
=== Mads Sørensen and children ===
Gunness married Mads Ditlev Anton Sørensen in 1884. The couple owned a candy store which later burned to the ground. Their home had also burned down, and both instances granted the couple insurance payouts. Two babies in Gunness' home died from inflammation of the large intestine. Gunness had insured both of the children and collected a large insurance check after each death. Neighbors gossiped about the babies, since Gunness never appeared to be pregnant.

Sørensen had purchased two life insurance policies. On July 30, 1900, both policies were active at the same time, as one would expire that day and the other would enter into force. Sørensen died of cerebral hemorrhage that day. Gunness explained he had come home with a headache and she provided him with quinine powder for the pain; she later checked on him and he was dead. Gunness collected money from both the expiring life insurance policy, and the one that went into effect that day, making a total of $5,000. With the insurance money, she moved to La Porte, Indiana, and bought a pig farm.

=== Peter Gunness ===
Belle married Peter Gunness on April 1, 1902. The following week, while Peter was out of the house, his infant daughter died of unknown causes in Belle's care. Peter died eight months later due to a skull injury. Belle explained that Peter reached for something on a high shelf and a meat grinder fell on him, smashing his skull. The district coroner convened a coroner's jury, suspecting murder, but nothing came of the case. Belle collected $3,000 insurance money for Peter's death.

=== Disappearances ===
Gunness began placing marriage ads in Chicago newspapers in 1905. One of her ads was answered by a Wisconsin farmhand, Henry Gurholt. After travelling to La Porte, Gurholt wrote his family, saying that he liked the farm, was in good health, and requesting that they send him seed potatoes. When they failed to hear from him after that, the family contacted Gunness. She told them Gurholt had gone off with horse traders to Chicago. She kept his trunk and fur overcoat. John Moe of Minnesota answered Gunness's ad in 1906. After they had corresponded for several months, Moe travelled to La Porte and withdrew a large amount of cash. Although no one ever saw Moe again, a carpenter who did occasional work for Gunness observed that Moe's trunk remained in her house, along with more than a dozen others.

=== Andrew Helgelien and discovery of multiple graves ===
Her criminal activities came to light in April 1908, when the Gunness farmhouse in La Porte, Indiana burned to the ground. In the ruins, authorities found the bodies of a headless adult woman, initially identified as Belle Gunness, and her three children. Further investigation unearthed the partial remains of at least eleven additional people on the Gunness property. Among the first victims identified was Jennie Olson, whose body was identified so positively that the coroner issued a death certificate; Gunness had told neighbors that Olson had gone to Los Angeles.

After the fire at the Gunness homestead led to the discovery of bodies believed to be Gunness and her children, La Porte police authorities were contacted by Asle Helgelien, who had found correspondence between his brother, Andrew Helgelien, and Gunness; the letters included petitions for him to relocate to La Porte, to bring money, and to keep the move a secret. A visit by Asle Helgelien to the Gunness farm with a former hired hand led to attention being paid to "soft depressions" in what had been made into a pen for hogs; after briefly digging one of the depressions in the lot, a gunny sack was found that contained "two hands, two feet, and one head", which Helgelien recognized to be those of his brother.

Immediate inspection of the site revealed that there were dozens of such "slumped depressions" in the Gunness yard, and further digging and investigation at the site yielded multiple burlap sacks containing "torsos and hands, arms hacked from the shoulders down, masses of human bone wrapped in loose flesh that dripped like jelly", from trash-covered depressions that proved to be graves. In each case, the body had been butchered in the same manner—the body decapitated, the arms removed at the shoulders, and the legs severed at the knees. Blunt trauma and gashes characterized the skulls that were found that had been separated from the bodies.

After finding the parts of five bodies on the first day, and an additional six on the second—some in shallow graves under the original hog pen, others near an outhouse or a lake—"the police stopped counting". With these discoveries, the perceptions of Belle Gunness, as reported in newspaper descriptions of a praiseworthy woman—dying in the fire that consumed her house, "in a desperate attempt to save her children"—were reassessed. Despite the initial success with the identification of Andrew Helgelien, and despite the fact that widening news coverage of the mass murders invited inquiries from families with men that had gone missing, "[m]ost of the remains could not be identified."

== Involvement of Ray Lamphere and Gunness legacy ==
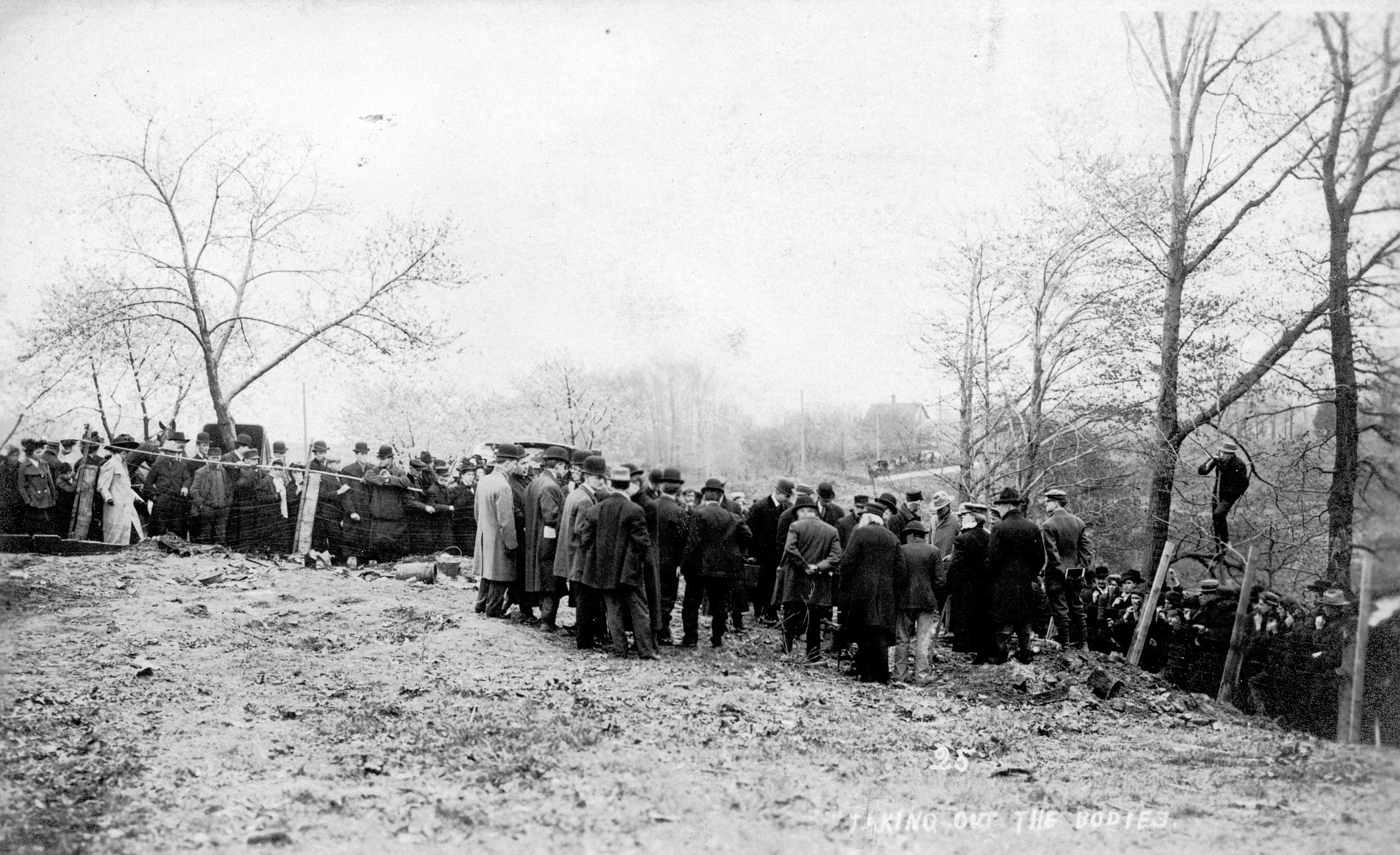
Removing bodies from Gunness' farm, LaPorte, Indiana, 1908

Ray Lamphere was Gunness' hired hand and on-and-off lover. In November 1908, Lamphere was convicted of arson in connection with the fire at Gunness' house. Lamphere later confessed that Gunness had placed advertisements seeking male companionship, only to rob and murder the men who responded and subsequently visited her on the farm. Lamphere stated that Gunness asked him to burn down the farmhouse with her children inside. Lamphere also asserted that the body thought to be Gunness's was in fact a murder victim, chosen and planted to mislead investigators. The brother of one victim had warned Gunness that he might arrive at the farm shortly to investigate his brother's disappearance. According to Lamphere, this impending visit motivated Gunness to destroy her house, fake her own death, and flee. When Lamphere was arrested, he was wearing John Moe's overcoat and Henry Gurholt's watch.

Edward Bechly, a journalist, was given a secret assignment to acquire access to a confession and publish it, thus bringing a second, inconsistent Lamphere account to public knowledge. The second confession was made to Reverend Edwin Schell, who was minister of the Methodist church of LaPorte, Indiana, who was personally requested by Lamphere to visit him at the Indiana State Prison in Michigan City, Indiana, where he was being held. Realizing the importance of this confession, Reverend Schell recorded Lamphere's verbal confession on paper, had him sign it, and then sealed it and locked it in his personal safe. Bechly attempted to convince Schell to allow him to publish this later confession, but was denied by both Schell and his wife. However, a separate newspaper published a story with speculation regarding the second Lamphere confession. Schell offered the confession to Bechly, which was later published. The publication of Lamphere's confession resulted in the subsequent arrest of his accomplice Elisabeth Smith.

Three rings found on a charred hand of the body initially suggested near-conclusive identification: two were gold bands, one set with a diamond that had been given to Gunness by her first husband Mads Sorenson on their wedding day. Investigators noted, however, that the rings were not fully conclusive evidence; given Gunness's reputation for cunning, it was suggested she could have placed the rings on a planted corpse specifically to create the impression of her own death. Gunness was pronounced dead, even though Dr. Harry Long of La Porte, who had known Gunness personally, stated unequivocally on May 9 that the body was not hers: it weighed approximately 160 pounds against Gunness's 325 or more, was nearly five inches shorter, had well-formed and rounded arms unlike Gunness's, and, most tellingly, had carefully manicured fingernails, something Gunness was not known to do. "It is not that of Mrs. Gunness," he said. "I am sure of that." Gunness's dentist, identified as Innorton, positively identified a gold crown found in the ruins as one he had placed in her mouth, which some investigators took as conclusive proof of her death. No explanation was provided for what happened to the body's head. Whether Gunness died in the fire or escaped remained uncertain, although the sheriff blamed a Chicago American reporter for inventing the "escaped" story. Reported "sightings" of Gunness in the Chicago area continued long after she was declared dead. In 2008, DNA tests were performed on the headless corpse in an attempt to compare the DNA in the corpse against a sample from a letter Gunness had sent to one of her victims, but due to its age the sample was not able to be properly tested. After Gunness' crimes came to light, the Gunness farm became a tourist attraction. Spectators came from across the country to see the mass graves, and concessions and souvenirs were sold.

== Legacy ==
Gunness has been the subject of at least two American musical ballads. Stewart H Holbrook wrote a short account of Gunness' murders in 'Belle of Indiana', in his book From Murder Out Yonder, in 1941, which was also published in All Mystery Magazine in 1950. Method, a 2004 film, stars Elizabeth Hurley as Rebecca who portrays Gunness in a film within the film, shot in Romania. In 2017, true crime podcast My Favorite Murder released a live episode detailing Gunness' crimes. The Farm, a 2021 film starring Traci Lords, is based on Gunness.

Hell's Princess: The Mystery of Belle Gunness, Butcher of Men is a 2018 non-fiction book by Harold Schechter on the life of Gunness. In the Garden of Spite: A Novel of the Black Widow of LaPorte is a 2021 novel by Camilla Bruce based on Gunness. It was published in the UK with the title Triflers Need Not Apply. My Men, a 2023 Norwegian novel by Victoria Kielland, is a fictionalized account of Gunness's life. In 2024, the novel Bajo tierra seca by César Pérez Gellida, which was awarded the Spanish Premio Nadal, was inspired by Gunness.

== See also ==
- Béla Kiss, a Hungarian serial killer believed to have murdered at least 23 young women and one man.
- List of fugitives from justice who disappeared
- List of unsolved murders (1900–1979)
- Lonely hearts killer

General:

- List of serial killers in the United States
- List of serial killers by number of victims
