= Watseka Union Depot =

- U.S. National Register of Historic Places
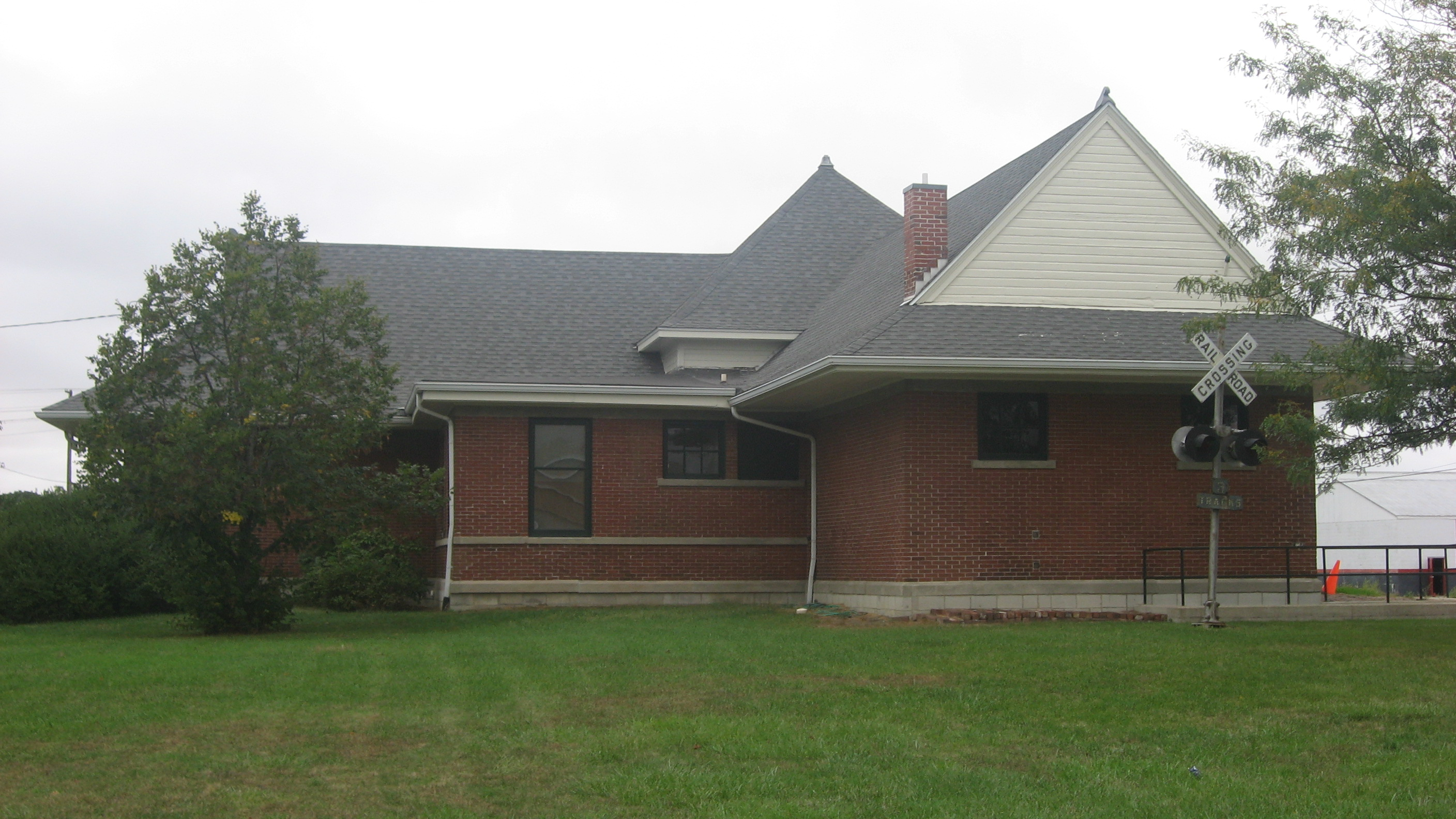

- Location within Illinois Location within the United States
- Location: 121 South Second St., Watseka, Illinois
- Coordinates: 40°46′32″N 87°44′12″W
- Area: less than one acre
- Architectural style: Tudor Revival
- NRHP reference No.: 99001595
- Added to NRHP: December 22, 1999

The Watseka Union Depot is a historic railway station located on South Second Street in Watseka, Illinois. The depot was built in 1906 to accommodate traffic on the Chicago and Eastern Illinois Railroad through the city; it also served the Toledo, Peoria and Western Railway's line.

Railway service through Watseka began in 1858, when the Peoria and Oquawka Railroad (a predecessor of the TP&W) opened a line through the city; the Chicago, Danville and Vincennes Railroad, which became part of the C&EI, began passenger service to Watseka in 1871 and soon accounted for the bulk of the city's rail traffic.

The TP&W provided a plan for the new depot in 1904, which was similar to other stations along its line. The Watseka Women's Club provided planning input on the city's behalf; their influence resulted in the addition of a women's waiting room and a more monumental station with a depot park, both uncommon elements in a station serving a city of Watseka's size.

By 1916, the new station served six trains which started or ended service in Watseka and twelve through routes; the line through Watseka remained profitable through the 1940s, and the city retained C&EI service until 1971.

The depot was nominated for the National Register of Historic Places in 1988; it was determined eligible, but was not listed due to an objection from the railways that owned the station. In 1989–90, the building was moved to save it from demolition; its National Register eligibility was revoked due to the move, but it was nominated again and listed on December 22, 1999.

Preceding station	Chicago and Eastern Illinois Railroad	Following station
Coaler toward St. Louis	Chicago – St. Louis	Ben toward Chicago
