= Frank M. Crangle =

American lawyer and politician

Frank M. Crangle (January 3, 1861 – January 29, 1934) was an American lawyer and politician.

Crangle was born in Grundy County, Illinois. He went to the public schools and to Grand Prairie Seminary in Onarga, Illinois. He then taught school and was superintendent of schools for Iroquois County, Illinois. He studied law at Valparaiso University and was admitted to the Illinois bar in 1900. Crangle practiced law in Watseka, Illinois. Crangle was involved with the Democratic Party. He served in the Illinois House of Representatives in 1901 and 1902, in 1905 and 1906, and in 1911 and 1912. He served as master-in-chancery from 1912 until his death in 1934. Crangle died at Iroquois Hospital in Watseka, Illinois from complication from diabetes which resulted in the amputation of his legs.
