= Watseka, Illinois =

- City
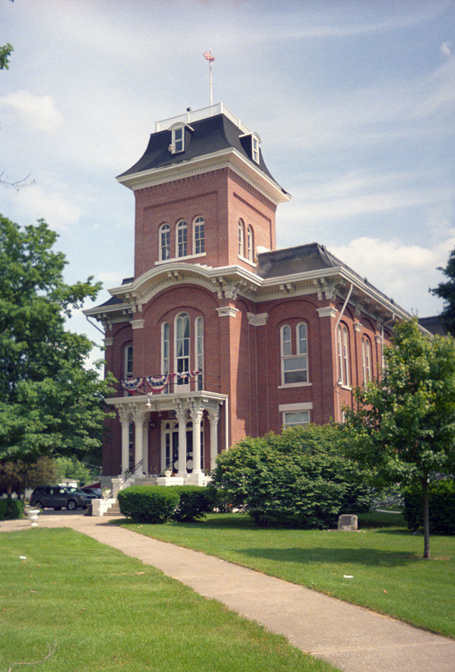
- Old Iroquois County Courthouse in Watseka
- Interactive map of Watseka, Illinois
- Location within Illinois Location within the United States
- Coordinates: 40°46′34″N 87°44′11″W
- Country: United States
- State: Illinois
- County: Iroquois
- Township: Belmont, Middleport

Government
  - Type: City Council

Area
  - Total: 2.95 sq mi (7.63 km^{2})
  - Land: 2.95 sq mi (7.63 km^{2})
  - Water: 0 sq mi (0.00 km^{2})
- Elevation: 640 ft (200 m)

Population (2020)
  - Total: 4,679
  - Density: 1,589.2/sq mi (613.59/km^{2})
- ZIP Code: 60970
- Area code: 815
- FIPS code: 17-79228
- GNIS feature ID: 2397217
- Website: www.watsekacity.org

Watseka is a city in and the county seat of Iroquois County, Illinois, United States. It is located approximately 15 miles (24 km) west of the Illinois-Indiana state line on U.S. Route 24.

The population of Watseka was 4,679 as of the 2020 Census.

== History ==
Incorporated in 1865, the name "Watseka" derives from the Potawatomi name "Watch-e-kee", "Daughter of the Evening Star", the wife of early eastern Illinois settler Gurdon Saltonstall Hubbard.

The Old Iroquois County Courthouse was constructed in 1866, with two additions built in 1881 and 1927. In the early 1960s, an Iroquois County resident, Mrs. Katherine Clifton, bequeathed to the county in her will a large sum of money and a site upon which to build a new courthouse. It is the only courthouse in the United States built entirely with private funds.

The old courthouse was advertised for sale and fell into disuse. In 1967, during the Centennial Celebration of Watseka, the Iroquois County Historical Society was organized, and circulated petitions throughout the county not to sell the Old Courthouse. The petitions were approved by the County Board of Supervisors, and the Old Courthouse re-opened as a museum that same year. In 1975, the Old Courthouse was listed on the National Register of Historic Places.

The Watseka Union Depot, built in 1906 to serve the two railroads that passed through the town, was moved to a new location in 1989 and listed on the U.S. National Register of Historic Places in 1999.

== Geography ==
Watseka is located near the center of Iroquois County, at the intersection of U.S. Route 24 and Illinois Route 1. The Iroquois River winds along the north side of the town and is joined by Sugar Creek on the west side of town. The south half of the town is in Belmont Township; the north half is in Middleport Township.

According to the 2021 census gazetteer files, Watseka has a total area of 2.94 square miles (7.61 km^{2}), all land.

=== Climate ===
Climate data for Watseka, Illinois (1991–2020 normals, extremes 1893–present)
Month	Jan	Feb	Mar	Apr	May	Jun	Jul	Aug	Sep	Oct	Nov	Dec	Year
Record high °F (°C)	68 (20)	73 (23)	86 (30)	91 (33)	99 (37)	104 (40)	107 (42)	105 (41)	104 (40)	95 (35)	81 (27)	71 (22)	107 (42)
Mean daily maximum °F (°C)	32.7 (0.4)	37.4 (3.0)	49.6 (9.8)	62.3 (16.8)	73.5 (23.1)	82.1 (27.8)	84.8 (29.3)	83.2 (28.4)	78.7 (25.9)	65.9 (18.8)	50.7 (10.4)	38.0 (3.3)	61.6 (16.4)
Daily mean °F (°C)	24.1 (−4.4)	27.9 (−2.3)	39.1 (3.9)	50.3 (10.2)	61.8 (16.6)	70.9 (21.6)	73.7 (23.2)	71.6 (22.0)	65.4 (18.6)	53.6 (12.0)	40.8 (4.9)	29.7 (−1.3)	50.7 (10.4)
Mean daily minimum °F (°C)	15.5 (−9.2)	18.4 (−7.6)	28.5 (−1.9)	38.3 (3.5)	50.2 (10.1)	59.8 (15.4)	62.7 (17.1)	60.0 (15.6)	52.2 (11.2)	41.3 (5.2)	30.9 (−0.6)	21.4 (−5.9)	39.9 (4.4)
Record low °F (°C)	−28 (−33)	−27 (−33)	−13 (−25)	3 (−16)	26 (−3)	35 (2)	42 (6)	38 (3)	20 (−7)	11 (−12)	−9 (−23)	−26 (−32)	−28 (−33)
Average precipitation inches (mm)	2.07 (53)	1.98 (50)	2.42 (61)	3.65 (93)	4.41 (112)	5.02 (128)	4.20 (107)	3.50 (89)	3.19 (81)	3.24 (82)	2.65 (67)	2.10 (53)	38.43 (976)
Average snowfall inches (cm)	5.4 (14)	4.7 (12)	1.6 (4.1)	0.3 (0.76)	0.0 (0.0)	0.0 (0.0)	0.0 (0.0)	0.0 (0.0)	0.0 (0.0)	0.0 (0.0)	0.7 (1.8)	4.4 (11)	17.1 (43)
Average precipitation days (≥ 0.01 in)	10.2	8.3	9.7	12.0	12.4	11.1	9.4	9.4	8.6	9.8	9.7	10.2	120.8
Average snowy days (≥ 0.1 in)	4.4	3.2	1.5	0.2	0.0	0.0	0.0	0.0	0.0	0.0	0.8	2.9	13.0
Source: NOAA

== Demographics ==
Historical population
Census	Pop.	Note	%±
1870	1,551		—
1880	1,507		−2.8%
1890	2,017		33.8%
1900	2,505		24.2%
1910	2,476		−1.2%
1920	2,817		13.8%
1930	3,144		11.6%
1940	3,744		19.1%
1950	4,235		13.1%
1960	5,219		23.2%
1970	5,294		1.4%
1980	5,543		4.7%
1990	5,424		−2.1%
2000	5,670		4.5%
2010	5,255		−7.3%
2020	4,679		−11.0%
U.S. Decennial Census

=== 2020 census ===
As of the 2020 census, Watseka had a population of 4,679.

The median age was 45.3 years. 20.8% of residents were under the age of 18 and 23.0% of residents were 65 years of age or older. For every 100 females there were 96.6 males, and for every 100 females age 18 and over there were 90.9 males age 18 and over.

99.7% of residents lived in urban areas, while 0.3% lived in rural areas.

There were 2,063 households and 1,284 families in Watseka, of which 23.8% had children under the age of 18 living in them. Of all households, 37.4% were married-couple households, 20.8% were households with a male householder and no spouse or partner present, and 33.2% were households with a female householder and no spouse or partner present. About 38.1% of all households were made up of individuals and 20.3% had someone living alone who was 65 years of age or older.

The population density was 1,589.33 inhabitants per square mile (613.64/km^{2}). There were 2,444 housing units at an average density of 830.16 per square mile (320.53/km^{2}), of which 15.6% were vacant. The homeowner vacancy rate was 3.8% and the rental vacancy rate was 18.0%.

Racial composition as of the 2020 census
Race	Number	Percent
White	4,058	86.7%
Black or African American	77	1.6%
American Indian and Alaska Native	18	0.4%
Asian	31	0.7%
Native Hawaiian and Other Pacific Islander	1	0.0%
Some other race	114	2.4%
Two or more races	380	8.1%
Hispanic or Latino (of any race)	370	7.9%

=== Income and poverty ===
The median income for a household in the city was $38,162, and the median income for a family was $58,641. Males had a median income of $30,449 versus $25,827 for females. The per capita income for the city was $24,915. About 6.7% of families and 12.9% of the population were below the poverty line, including 13.9% of those under age 18 and 10.0% of those age 65 or over.

== Notable people ==
- Fern Andra (1893–1974; birth name Vernal Andrews), circus performer, actress, early film director
- Henry Bacon (1866–1924), architect of Lincoln Memorial in Washington, D.C.
- Fred Bechly (1924–2004), electrical engineer in the field of color television broadcasting
- Edward Bechly (1874–1945), editor and proprietor of Iroquois County Times-Democrat
- Craig Calhoun (1952–), economist and educator, President of Berggruen Institute (2016–)
- Sam Campbell (1895–1962), popular author and nature enthusiast
- P.C. Cast, young adult author (House of Night series)
- Frank M. Crangle (1861–1934), Illinois state representative and lawyer
- Rex Everhart (1920–2000), musical theatre and voice actor
- Mike L. Fry, original Happy the Hobo on the children's television series Happy's Place
- A.E. Henning, City Council member of Los Angeles (1929–1933)
- Curtis Painter (born 1985), NFL quarterback 2009–2014
- Harold Reetz (born 1948), former President of the Foundation for Agronomic Research.
- Sam Rice, Hall of Fame baseball outfielder, 1924 World Series champion
- Vaughn Walker (born 1944), chief judge of the Northern District of California
- Mary Margaret Whipple (born 1940), former Virginia state senator
- Gordie Windhorn (1933-2022), former Major League Baseball player

== See also ==
- Watseka Wonder
