= Freiderich August Bechly =

American bee researcher

- Born: 13 August 1835; Prenzlau, Brandenburg, Kingdom of Prussia
- Died: 21 January 1916 (aged 80); Searsboro, Iowa, U.S
- Other name: Fred Bechly
- Occupations: beekeeper and researcher
- Known for: Apiology
- Spouses: Hephzibah Dumville (m. 1833; died 1869) Lydia Maria Weesner (m. 1850; died 1899)
- Children: 7

Freiderich August Bechly (13 August 1835 – 21 January 1916) was a Kingdom of Prussia-born American bee researcher, apiologist, and farmer.

== Personal life ==
Freiderich Bechly was born in Prenzlau, Brandenburg, Kingdom of Prussia to Friedrich Johann Bechly (1807-1892) and Charlotte Beutel (1812-1876). He emigrated to America with his parents and siblings in 1852. Freiderich had two children with his first wife, Hephzibah Dumville, who died in 1869. He had five children with his second wife, Lydia Marie Weesner (1850–1899), but two died from scarlet fever as children.

Bechly died on January 21, 1916, while visiting his children on the family farm in Searsboro, Iowa. At Bechly's funeral, Iowa Judge William Robinson Lewis read a tribute for Fred Bechly that was published in the Poweshiek County Palladium. The tribute describes the family's arrival in New York City, learning to cope with the challenges of immigration, and settlement with a German-speaking community in Sheboygan, Wisconsin. The father, Freiderick John Bechly, purchased land at a crossroads outside of Sheboygan which became known as Bechly's Corners where he owned and operated a blacksmiths shop. At age 21 Fred Bechly set out on his own to Chicago, but was unable to find employment there so he traveled further south to Jacksonville, Illinois, where he found work as a farm hand. It was there in 1864 that he married Hephzibah Dumville and they moved to Searsboro, Iowa where he purchased a farm of 80 acres.

== Career ==
Fred Bechly owned a farm in Searsboro, Iowa, was a noted Apiologist, and a correspondent for the American Bee Journal.

His technique for introducing new queen bees to an existing hive was published in 1874. New queens are usually rejected by an existing hive. In his technique, Mr. Bechly removes a comb from the hive, places the comb and hive bees into an empty hive, and closes them in with the new queen. The bees being stressed by foreign imprisonment are unconcerned about the new queen. The old hive is left queenless and is also closed. Over the next several days, as the hives are reopened, the bees return to the old hive along with their new queen.

== Publications ==
Selections from the E. F. Phillips Beekeeping Collection at Mann Library, Cornell University:

"How I Introduce a New Queen", American Bee Journal, Vol. 10, No. 10, October 1874

"Introducing Queens, etc.", American Bee Journal, Vol. 22, No. 7, February 17, 1886

"Laying Workers. My Experience with Laying Workers, etc.", American Bee Journal, Vol. 25, No. 3, January 19, 1889

"Hearing of Bees. Worker in a Queen Cell", American Bee Journal, Vol. 30, No. 24, December 8, 1892

"Bee Paralysis. Laying Queens Fighting, etc.", American Bee Journal, Vol. 37, No. 43, October 28, 1897

=== Other publications ===
"Wintered on Honey-Dew, etc.", American Bee Journal, Vol. 30, No. 22, November 24, 1892

"Queen-Mating Attempted in a Small Cage", Gleanings in Bee Culture, Vol. 31, page 677, August 1, 1903

"Extra Good Report for Iowa", American Bee Journal, Vol. 52, page 378, December 1912

== See also ==
- Honey bee
- Apiology
- Beekeeping
