= Sam Campbell (writer) =

American author

- Born: Samuel Arthur Campbell; August 1, 1895; Watseka, Illinois
- Died: April 13, 1962 (aged 66); Barrington, Illinois
- Occupations: writer, lecturer, photographer
- Spouse: Virginia ("Giny") Adams (m. 1941)
- Writing career
- Genres: Children's literature Nature writing

Samuel Arthur Campbell (August 1, 1895 – April 13, 1962) was an American nature writer, sometimes known as the "Philosopher of the Forest". He wrote for children and adults, and lectured widely.

== Life ==
Campbell was born on August 1, 1895, in Watseka, Illinois, the youngest of two children of Arthur J. and Katherine "Kittie" (née Lyman) Campbell. He married Virginia ("Giny") Adams on June 10, 1941. Among his friends was environmentalist Sigurd F. Olson. Campbell contributed an article to the inaugural issue of Olson's magazine North Country in spring 1951.

Campbell died April 13, 1962, in Barrington, Illinois. A trail near his home in Three Lakes, located in the Chequamegon–Nicolet National Forest, is named after him.

== Writing and lectures ==
Campbell was a writer, lecturer, photographer, and filmmaker.

From 1934 to 1958, he lectured on behalf of the Chicago and North Western Railway, which sought to promote its lines as a means for vacationers to visit attractions in northern Wisconsin and the Upper Peninsula of Michigan.

He studied wild animals from his home in Three Lakes, Wisconsin, which he called the "sanctuary of Wegimind"—reportedly after an Ojibwe word for "mother"—and during his various travels. He had visited the Three Lakes area from boyhood.

== Works ==
=== For children ===
- Campbell, Sam (1943). How's Inky? A Porcupine and His Pals Offer Some Highlights on Happiness. Indianapolis: Bobbs-Merrill. ISBN 9781881545194. OCLC 5181860. Illustrated by Bob Kuhn. Translated into French, as Bob et mes bêtes, 1956.
- Campbell, Sam (1944). Too Much Salt and Pepper. Mountain View, California: Pacific Press. ISBN 9781881545675. OCLC 689626730.
- Campbell, Sam (1945). Eeny, Meeny, Miney, Mo - and Still-Mo. Indianapolis: Bobbs-Merrill. ISBN 9781881545552. OCLC 171051368.
- Campbell, Sam (1946). A Tippy Canoe and Canada Too. Indianapolis: Bobbs-Merrill. ISBN 9781881545712. OCLC 765766449.
- Campbell, Sam (1948). On Wings of Cheer: A red-winged blackbird shares his happy heart. Indianapolis: Bobbs-Merrill. ISBN 9781881545514. OCLC 22096785.
- Campbell, Sam (1950). Moose Country. Indianapolis: Bobbs-Merrill. ISBN 9781881545538. OCLC 1011866200.
- Campbell, Sam (1952). The Seven Secrets of Somewhere Lake. Indianapolis: Bobbs-Merrill. ISBN 9781572582026. OCLC 1011809909. Translated into French, as Le Lac aux sept secrets, 1953.
- Campbell, Sam (1954). Loony Coon. Indianapolis: Bobbs-Merrill. ISBN 9781881545248. OCLC 56386632.
- Campbell, Sam (1955). Fiddlesticks and Freckles. Indianapolis: Bobbs-Merrill. ISBN 9781881545965. OCLC 1034667361.
- Campbell, Sam (1957). Beloved Rascals. Indianapolis: Bobbs-Merrill. ISBN 9781881545590. OCLC 659860249.
- Campbell, Sam (1959). Sweet Sue's Adventures. Indianapolis: Bobbs-Merrill. ISBN 9781881545217. OCLC 1036875145.
- Campbell, Sam (1962). Calamity Jane. Indianapolis: Bobbs-Merrill. ISBN 9781881545163. OCLC 56387841.

=== For adults ===
- Campbell, Sam (1933). Sanctuary Letters. Eagle River, Wisconsin. OCLC 7370933.
- Campbell, Sam (1933). Conquest of Grief.
- Campbell, Sam (1937). Nature's Messages of Peace. Chicago: Associated Authors. OCLC 16567525.
- Campbell, Sam (1952). Nature's Messages: A Book of Wilderness Wisdom. Chicago: Rand McNally. hdl:2027/mdp.39076002249006. OCLC 752875148.
- Campbell, Sam (1974). Woodland Portraits. Milwaukee: Ideals Publishing. OCLC 1036966705. Illustrated by Harry Moeller.

== Sources ==
- Bournoville, Justin J.; Knudson, Douglas; Brewster, Carlone (2016). Sam's Trees: A Guide to the Sam Campbell Memorial Trail (PDF). Three Lakes Historical Society and Museum.
- Henson, Shandelle Marie (2002). Sam Campbell: Philosopher of the Forest. TEACH Services. ISBN 9781572582217.
- Yahr, Steve (February 17, 2008). Sam Campbell: "Philosopher of the Forest" (PDF). Chicago & North Western Historical Society.
- Yahr, Steven (2019). Letters from the Sanctuary: The Sam Campbell Story. A B Publishing. ISBN 9781597655422.
