= Old Iroquois County Courthouse =

- U.S. National Register of Historic Places
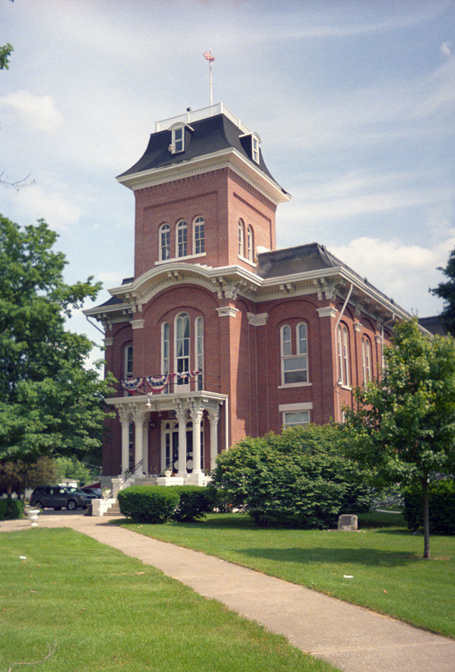
- The courthouse in 2006, photographed by Calvin Beale

- Location within Illinois Location within the United States
- Interactive map showing the location of Old Iroquois County Courthouse
- Location: Cherry St. at 2nd St., Watseka, Illinois
- Coordinates: 40°46′28″N 87°44′8″W
- Area: 1.3 acres (0.53 ha)
- Built: 1866
- Built by: Mantor, A.C.
- Architect: Leach, C.B.
- Architectural style: Italianate
- NRHP reference No.: 75000663
- Added to NRHP: June 13, 1975

The Old Iroquois County Courthouse, now known as the Iroquois County Museum, is a history museum in Watseka, Illinois, which served as the Iroquois County courthouse from 1866 until 1964. The Italianate building was designed by C.B. Leach and built by contractor A.C. Mantor. In addition to housing county courts and offices, the building also served as the county jail and sheriff's residence. In 1881, an addition was placed on the building, and the courthouse's octagonal tower was replaced by a square tower. A second addition was constructed in 1927; in the same year, the courthouse's copper dome was removed and replaced by a mansard roof.

When a new courthouse was built in 1964, county officials planned to demolish the old courthouse; however, local outcry convinced the county to temporarily save the building. The courthouse sat disused and neglected until 1967, when the Iroquois County Historical Society formed and purchased the building for a museum. The museum is the home of the county's genealogical records library and includes collections of minerals and fossils, Native American artifacts, antique dolls, and numerous other historical items. The original courtroom is now used as a theater and concert hall.

The courthouse was added to the National Register of Historic Places on June 13, 1975.
