= Hans Bechly =

German labour leader, trade unionist (1871–1954)

- Born: Hans Georg Wilhelm Bechly; November 20, 1871; Neubrandenburg, Mecklenburg-Strelitz, German Empire
- Died: 1954 (aged 82–83)
- Occupation: Labor leader
- Known for: German trade unions

Hans Georg Wilhelm Bechly (1871–1954) was a German labor leader and trade unionist.

== Early life ==
Hans Georg Wilhelm Bechly was born on November 20, 1871, to Adolph and Anna (Gragow) Bechly in Neubrandenburg, Mecklenburg-Strelitz, Germany. He married Clara Graf in 1909, and they had two children.

Hans trained as an apprentice from 1889 to 1893 in Rostock, Germany, and he served the military with the Queen Elisabeth Grenadier Guards Regiment in Charlottenburg 1893–1894.

== Career ==
Bechly worked for several years in clerical positions, and became employed with the German National Retail Clerks Association (DHV) in July 1900. He rose within the association and became interim president of the DHV in 1909.

Bechly was Chairman of the German National Retail Clerks Association (DHV) from 1911 to 1933, and also Chairman of the General Association of German Professional Employees (Gedag) from 1923 to 1933.

On May 2, 1933, Adolf Hitler used his powers as the new Chancellor of Germany to dissolve all trade unions and issue arrest warrants for unionist leadership. Bechly went into seclusion to avoid arrest, but emerged after 1945 to help form the German Salaried Employees' Union (DAG) which was established April, 1949. In 2001 the DAG merged with four unions of the Confederation of German Trade Unions (DGB) to form Vereinte Dienstleistungsgewerkschaft, which is currently known as Ver.di.

== Recognition ==
Bechly was a recipient of the Order of the Crown (Prussia), 4th Class. In 1952, he was awarded the Grand Cross of the Order of Merit of the Federal Republic of Germany.

== See also ==
- List of trade unions in Germany
