= Steven L. Miller =

- Born: 1945; Kansas City, Missouri, United States
- Education: BS chemical engineering, 1967
- Alma mater: University of Illinois at Urbana-Champaign
- Occupation: Retired CEO of Shell Oil
- Spouse: Sheila
- Children: 2

Steven L. Miller is a businessman who has been a prominent leader in the American oil industry, serving as chairman of the board of directors, president, and CEO of Shell Oil Company from 1999 to his retirement in 2002. A native of Kansas City, Missouri, he was born in 1945, and graduated from the University of Illinois at Urbana-Champaign in 1967. He currently resides in Houston, Texas, where he promotes volunteer work through his company, SLM Discovery Ventures.

== Early and personal life ==
Miller was born in 1945 in Kansas City, Missouri, but spent most of his childhood in Bismarck, North Dakota. It was there, living next to 5 baseball fields and a golf course, that he developed his lifelong passion for both sports.

Miller's family moved to the Chicago, Illinois, area during high school, and from there he went to the University of Illinois at Urbana-Champaign. He chose to major in chemical engineering, within the College of Liberal Arts and Sciences, later stating that he preferred the wider range of education provided by a liberal arts education. He has also credited part of his later success in management to this decision.

During his time at the University of Illinois, Miller joined Triangle Fraternity, a fraternity aimed specifically at those in the fields of engineering, architecture, and science. He has remained quite active in the organization on the national and alumni levels, donating both experience and money. His most visible accomplishment is the Steven L. Miller President's Leadership Academy, an annual leadership training program for chapter presidents.

Miller currently resides with his wife, Sheila, in Houston. They have two children. He remains active in both baseball and golf, and holds an avid interest in American history. As a result of these hobbies, his current office is located at the Houston Astros' Minute Maid Park, overlooking the field, and he has served as a member of the board and trustee for the World Golf Association and First Tee, respectively, as well as being an honorary member of the Houston Golf Association. He is also a member and former trustee of the George C. Marshall Foundation. Miller is a practicing Presbyterian, and has served as an elder at three different churches.

== Career ==
Upon graduating from the University of Illinois with a B.S. in chemical engineering, Miller went to work with Shell at the Deer Park refinery outside of Houston, Texas, in the cracking and distillation operations. He moved on to a stint at Shell's head office in New York, and then in the Netherlands at the Hague, in 1973. By 1988, he had become the VP of marketing and refining, and in 1992, he was promoted to the Royal Dutch/Shell Group Management Team, in London, where he oversaw global supply and marketing operations.

Miller became one of the five managing directors of Shell in 1996, where he started the Grassroots Leadership Program. This was an effort designed to improve the company's operations through acquiring feedback from employees at all levels and departments, and helping those employees develop and implement new business strategies to address the problems they saw. His work in employing grassroots leadership was instrumental in turning around several of Shell's troubled and failing operations worldwide, most notably in Malaysia, Austria, and France – where brought profits into the double-digits.

Because of his success with grassroots leadership, Miller became the president, CEO, and chairman of the board of directors for the Royal Dutch/Shell Group in 1999. He succeeded the previous president and C.E.O., Jack Little, and Chairman Mark Moody-Stuart. He held this position until his retirement on September 30, 2002.

=== Retirement ===
In his time at Shell, Miller was noted for his dedication to community service, and after retirement, was able to give more of his time to charitable causes. He has done this primarily through SLM Discovery Ventures, Inc., which supports community outreach, higher education, and volunteer efforts through commercial projects.

Miller's other philanthropic efforts include serving as a trustee and chairman of the board for the United Way of Texas Gulf Coast from 2003 to 2005, and chairman of the board of directors of the Points of Light Foundation, one of America's leading volunteer organizations. He has also been on the board of directors of the America's Promise Alliance, which aims to reduce dropout rates, since 2002, served as chairman of the Center for Houston's Future, and a director of the National Urban League.

Additionally, Miller has remained active in the business community, serving on the boards of Applied Materials, a semiconductor wafer fabrication company in Santa Clara, California (1999–2005), and Reliant Energy in Houston (2003–present); and as chairman of the board of the Greater Houston Partnership (2002), Momentum Bio Ventures, Inc. (2003–2004). In 2003 and 2004, he chaired CEO Diversity Initiative for Diversity Best Practices in Washington, D.C., and is a former member of the Business Roundtable and National Petroleum Council. He has also served on the Texas Governor's Business Council and as a director for the American Petroleum Institute.

In the academic world too, Miller has made his share of contributions. He has been a director, chairman of the board, and trustee of the University of Illinois Foundation, coordinating alumni fundraising efforts for his alma mater, and is a senior member of the board of visitors of the University of Texas M.D. Anderson Cancer Center. He has also been very involved at Rice University, serving on the board of trustees, as well as the board of advisors for their James A. Baker III Institute for Public Policy.

== Awards ==
- Point of Light Award, Points of Light Foundation, 2002
- Volunteer Of The Year Award, United Way, 2007
- Alumni Achievement Award, University of Illinois, 2002
- Father of the Year, Houston Community Partners, 2002
- Man of Vision Award, Prevent Blindness, 2002
- Muriel Folloder Phillips Award for Advocacy of Children and Charitable Causes, ChildBuilders, 2002
- Diversity CEO Leadership Award, Diversity Best Practices, 2002
- Executive Communicator of the Year, Houston Business Journal, 2001
- City Proclamation for United Way Fundraising, Mayor of Houston, 2001
- The Agenda Award for Grassroots Leadership, Fast Company Magazine, 1998

== See also ==
- Notable Triangle Alumni
- Shell Oil Company
- University of Illinois at Urbana-Champaign
- Petroleum industry
