= Fred Bechly =

American electrical engineer and inventor

Fred Lorin Bechly
- H.J. Benzuly (left) and F.L. Bechly with the RCA Tri-color Kinescope Monitor (1952)
- Born: May 8, 1924; Watseka, Illinois, US
- Died: October 31, 2004 (aged 80); West Chester, Pennsylvania, US
- Resting place: Westminster Presbyterian Church Memorial Garden in Wilmington, Delaware
- Occupation: Electrical engineer
- Known for: Color video technology

Fred Lorin Bechly (May 8, 1924 – October 31, 2004) was an American electrical engineer and inventor in the field of color television broadcasting.

== Early life ==
Fred Bechly was born in Watseka, Illinois, to Edward Bechly and Ferne Smiley. He married and had two children.

In 1944, Bechly graduated from the University of Illinois with a Bachelor of Science in electrical engineering. As a student, Bechly was a member of Triangle Fraternity, and the American Institute of Electrical Engineers.

== Career ==
Fred Bechly began his career at RCA Corporation in Camden, New Jersey, in 1944, and he worked there for 40 years in the field of color television broadcasting.

Bechly was recognized early in his career, along with engineer H.J. Benzuly, for development of the Tri-color Kinescope Monitor. This development offered significant advantage over the prior RCA technology that used three kinescopes which combined three images using a mirror system to produce a single color picture. The RCA mirror system had been judged inferior to the CBS mechanical method by the Federal Communications Commission. The new Tri-color Kinescope technology was considered to be the RCA "secret weapon" vs. competitor CBS during establishment of the NTSC standard for color television by the U.S. Federal Communications Commission in 1953. RCA assigned model MI-40206 as the prototype which used the NTSC standard as its input. RCA ultimately prevailed with the NTSC standard on December 17, 1953. The Tri-color Kinescope Monitor was then commercialized to become the RCA TM-10A Color Monitor, which was the prototype for subsequent versions of the cathode ray tube color monitor in common use thereafter.

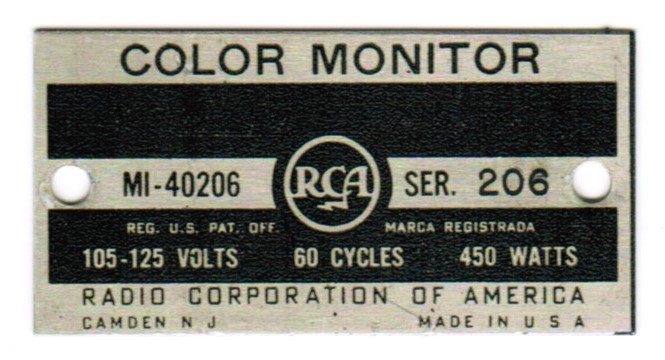
Identification plate for the original RCA MI-40206 color monitor designed by Fred Bechly in 1953.

In 1975, Bechly received a special achievement award for outstanding contribution to the RCA TR-600 (color video recorder) program.

Bechly was confirmed as a life member of the Institute of Electrical and Electronics Engineers (IEEE).

== Inventor ==
Fred Bechly was granted two United States patents, that were important to the field of color television broadcasting, as an employee of the RCA Corporation.

U.S. Patent # 2,874,212 was granted February 17, 1959, for Generation of Color Images from Monochrome Television Signals. This technology was applied commercially with the RCA Color Synthesizer program.

U.S. Patent # 3,893,168 was granted July 1, 1975, for Technique for Minimizing Interference in Video Recorder Reproducer Systems. Jing Jue Young was co-applicant for this patent. This technology was applied commercially with the RCA TR-600 program.

Mr. Bechly began work on a third patent for Tracking Head in support of the technology associated with the TR-800 project, but the rapid pace of technical advancement in video recording equipment at that time eclipsed the need for patent protection on the project.

== Emmy nomination ==
Fred Bechly was a member of the RCA Corporation team that was nominated for the 1958-1959 award of the National Academy of Television Arts and Sciences for Development of Color Video Tape.

The Emmy Award was a combination of several nominations described as "Industry-wide improvement of editing of Video Tape as exemplified by ABC – CBS – NBC".

== Death ==
Bechly died in West Chester, Pennsylvania, on October 31, 2004, at the age of 80.

== See also ==
- Triangle Fraternity
- Cathode ray tube
- Video tape recorder
- Quadruplex videotape
- Hagley Museum and Library
