= Franklin Bechly =

American judge (1873–1965)

- Born: Mar 13. 1873; Searsboro, Iowa, United States
- Died: April 2, 1965; Montezuma, Iowa, United States
- Other names: Frank Bechly
- Occupation: Iowa 6th District Judge
- Known for: 1938 Maytag strike injunctions

Franklin Bechly (1873-1965) was Iowa 6th District Judge from 1927 to 1959. Bechly presided during the 1938 Maytag Corporation labor dispute. The strike by UE Local 1116 was a test of the National Labor Relations Act of 1935 against the back-to-work movement of the Maytag Corporation. The Governor of Iowa declared martial law in Newton, Iowa to break the strike, and Bechly continued to preside until agreements were reached and martial law was lifted.

== Early life ==
Franklin Bechly was born to Freiderich August Bechly and Lydia Marie Weesner in Searsboro, Iowa. In 1903, Bechly married Edith Morgan (1880-1960). Although they had no children of their own, they parented two foster children.

== Career ==
Following graduation from Iowa State College, Bechly became Clerk of Court at the Poweshiek County Courthouse in Montezuma, Iowa.

In 1927, he was appointed 6th District Judge by Iowa Governor John Hammill, and served until his retirement in 1959.

Bechly formed the law firm Bechly, McNeil & Bonham, and also formed Bechly & Company, the first property abstract company in Poweshiek County, Iowa.

== Role in the Maytag Corporation 1938 labor dispute ==
In 1938 the Maytag Corporation instituted a 10% pay cut for its workforce at its manufacturing facility in Newton, Iowa. This action prompted a labor dispute and historic strike by the United Electrical, Radio and Machine Workers of America (UE) Local 1116 which had been formed there the prior year. The strike began May 9, 1938 and set the UE Local 1116, which was empowered by the National Labor Relations Act of 1935, against the back-to-work movement of the Maytag Corporation.

In her 2006 book, Radical Unionism in the Midwest, Rosemary Feurer details the role of Bechly in establishing injunctions against union activities that would interfere with the back-to-work movement by Maytag Corporation. On June 10, Bechly issued an injunction prohibiting union activists from dissuading Maytag workers from crossing the lines. On June 22, Bechly expanded the injunction to prohibit the union from mass picketing, trespassing on company property, and interfering with employees who wished to return to work.

On June 23, UE Local 1116 leader Hollis Hall defied Bechly's injunction by organizing a takeover of the Maytag plant that lasted until July 1. Hall and two others were arrested on July 7 and charged with kidnapping for holding five foremen as prisoners during the takeover. Hall was also charged with criminal syndicalism. Iowa Judge Homer Fuller was brought in for the trial of these and other union leaders, including UE President James B. Carey, who had been arrested for violating Bechly's injunctions. Fuller offered to dismiss charges if the union leaders would agree to end the strike. With no agreement, the union leaders were convicted and sentenced on July 13. Injunction violations continued and additional arrests of unionists occurred on July 18. UE Local 1116 held a rally on July 19 and planned for mass picketing to prevent the reopening of the Maytag plant. Confrontations on the picket line continued, prompting Iowa Governor Nelson Kraschel to declare martial law. Despite National Labor Relations Board requests for hearings regarding violations of the Wagner Act by Maytag, Kraschel used his powers to order workers back to reopen the plant.

The strike attracted national attention, and ended August 4 following military intervention by four companies of the Iowa National Guard. However, Governor Kraschel ordered martial law to continue until Bechly resolved the state cases against the union. In mid August, Bechly offered dismissal of the indictments and contempt of court citations against the union, if the union dismissed charges of unfair labor practices against Maytag. Ultimately these agreements were reached, martial law was lifted, and the Maytag workers continued to make washing machines, but at a 10% reduction in pay.

== Notable cases ==
The following cases are among those that progressed to the Iowa Supreme Court :

Boyles v. Hotel Maytag Co., February 18, 1936

Allison v. Daugherty, March 10, 1942

Quinn v. Bechly, July 28, 1952

Emmert v. Neiman, June 15, 1954

Hall v. Town of Keota, December 11, 1956

Rhodes v. Iowa State Highway Comm., January 13, 1959

Gingerich v. Protein Blenders, March 10, 1959

== See also ==
- Martial law
- State court (United States)
- Poweshiek County Courthouse
- Iowa District Courts
- Iowa Court of Appeals
- Iowa Supreme Court
- Iowa State Bar Association
