= Harold Reetz =

American agronomist

Dr. Harold F. Reetz Jr.
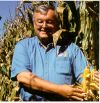
- Harold Reetz
- Born: March 10, 1948 (United States) Watseka, Illinois, U.S.
- Died: August 15, 2022 (aged 74)
- Occupations: Director of External Support and FAR, International Plant Nutrition Institute,

Harold F. Reetz Jr. (March 10, 1948 – August 15, 2022) was an American agronomist.

== Early life and education ==
He was born in 1948 at Watseka, Illinois, and grew up on a dairy/grain farm in the east central part of the state. After receiving his B.S. degree in 1970 at the University of Illinois, he earned his M.S. and Ph.D. degrees at Purdue University in crop physiology and ecology.

== Career ==
From 1974 to 1982, he was with the Purdue Agronomy Department as Extension/research specialist in corn production for Indiana. He joined the staff of the Potash & Phosphate Institute (PPI) in 1982 and has been involved with a number of innovative agronomic research and education programs in the Midwest region.

On January 1, 2004, Dr. Reetz became President of the Foundation for Agronomic Research (FAR). On January 1, 2007, he became Director of External Support and FAR, for the International Plant Nutrition Institute (IPNI). In that capacity, he coordinated fund raising efforts for research and education programs in close association with the IPNI regional staff. Dr. Reetz has been a leader in the Certified Crop Adviser (CCA) program from its beginning, and served as International CCA Board Chairman. He was an originator of the Information Agriculture (InfoAg) Conference series, beginning in 1995.

He was widely known for encouraging the development of high yield crop and soil management systems through efficient agronomic applications for new technology, including remote sensing, geographic information systems, and site-specific management. Dr. Reetz retired from IPNI on March 31, 2010, and formed Reetz Agronomics, LLC, and continued to provide agronomic consulting services for a variety of companies and organizations. In 2016, Dr. Reetz published a new book, Fertilizers and their Efficient Use, through the IFA.
