= Friedrich Johann Bechly =

Bechly family patriarch in America

- Born: January 21, 1807; Prenzlau, Brandenburg, Kingdom of Prussia
- Died: January 26, 1892 (aged 85); Sheboygan, Wisconsin, U.S
- Other names: Tenacresmith
- Occupation: knife maker
- Known for: Bechly family patriarch in America
- Spouse: Charlotte Beutel
- Children: 14

Friedrich Johann Bechly (1807–1892) was patriarch of the Bechly family in America.

== Personal life ==
Friedrich Johann Bechly was born to Friedrich Georg Bechly (1778–1844) and Christina Krummrey (1779-1844) in Prenzlau, within the Uckermark region of what is now Brandenburg, Germany. Friedrich married Charlotte Christine Beutel (1812-1876) in 1833 and they had 14 children together. Eight of their children died as infants in Germany. Their German family records are maintained at the French Church of Friedrichstadt in Berlin, Germany. Bechly died in 1892 and is buried in Wildwood Cemetery in Sheboygan, Wisconsin with his wife and four of his children.

== Immigration to America ==
Friedrich Johann Bechly is the patriarch of the Bechly family in America. In 1852 Bechly emigrated from the Kingdom of Prussia with his wife and six children. They arrived in New York City with no friends to greet them. They were alone in a great crowd with little knowledge of their new environment. They had followed other emigrants from Germany who had already dispersed to other parts of the nation. Bechly traveled by boat to Albany, and then by rail to Buffalo where he learned that there was a sizable German settlement near Milwaukee, Wisconsin. He brought his family there to Town Herman where they found friends from their homeland.

== Bechly Corners ==
Bechly purchased ten acres of land at a crossroads in Mosel, Wisconsin, within Sheboygan County. He used his remaining funds to purchase sawmill lumber to build a temporary house and a blacksmith shop which became known as Bechly Corners. The first house was little more than a board shanty that used four equidistant trees that served as columns to which he used the sawmill lumber to build crude walls and a roof. Bechly later built a log cabin on the property as a permanent residence for his family. He became a knife maker known as "Tenacresmith", with the nickname being that he owned ten acres and worked as a smith. Two of his children became involved in Sheboygan's thriving cigar industry in the late 1800s with son Ferdinand owning a cigar box factory, and son Charles owning the Charles Bechly Cigar Store on the corner of Eighth Street and Pennsylvania Avenue in Sheboygan City.

== See also ==
- Bechly
- Immigration to the United States
