= Searsboro, Iowa =

- Unincorporated community
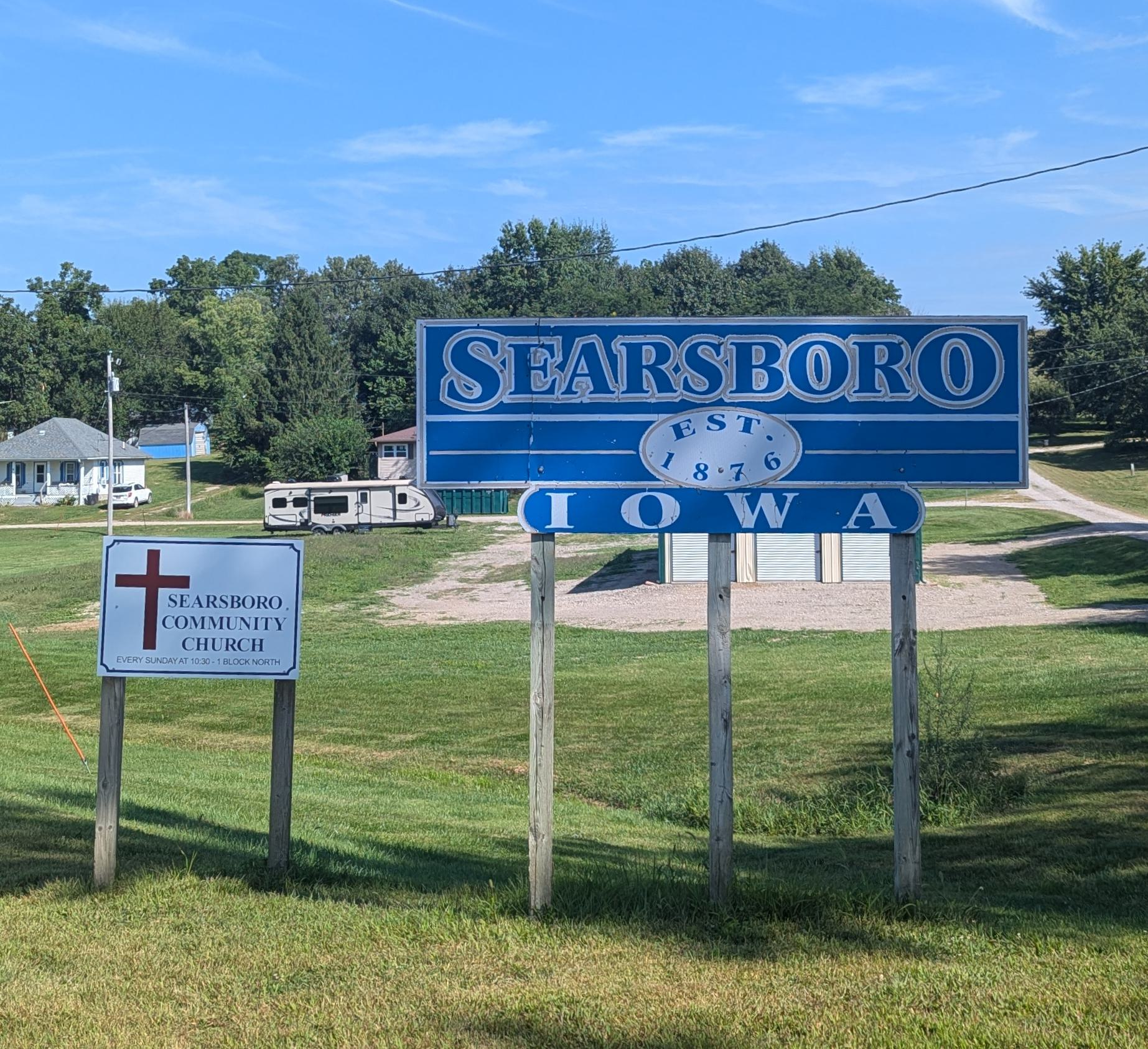
- Welcome sign

- Location of Searsboro, Iowa
- Coordinates: 41°34′46″N 92°42′13″W
- Country: United States
- State: Iowa
- County: Poweshiek

Area
  - Total: 0.45 sq mi (1.17 km^{2})
  - Land: 0.45 sq mi (1.17 km^{2})
  - Water: 0 sq mi (0.00 km^{2})
- Elevation: 843 ft (257 m)

Population (2020)
  - Total: 129
  - Density: 286.2/sq mi (110.51/km^{2})
- Time zone: UTC-6 (Central (CST))
  - Summer (DST): UTC-5 (CDT)
- ZIP code: 50242
- Area code: 641
- FIPS code: 19-71355
- GNIS feature ID: 0461495

Searsboro is an unincorporated community in Poweshiek County, Iowa, United States. The population was 129 at the 2020 census. The city attempted to disincorporate in 2011, but the move failed when Poweshiek County refused to take control of the city's infrastructure.

== Geography ==
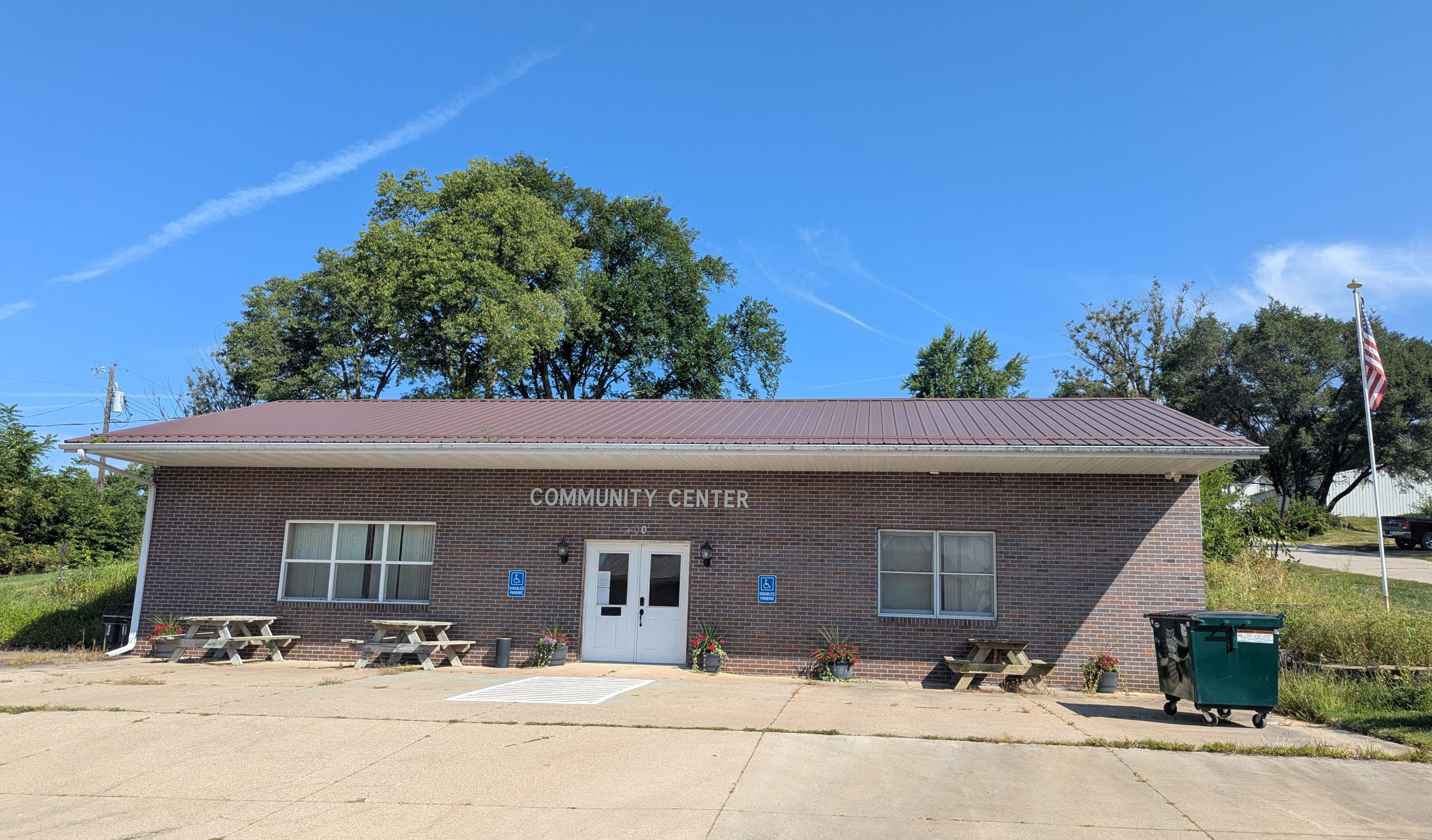
Community Center

Searsboro is located at 41°34′46″N 92°42′13″W (41.579519, -92.703703).

According to the United States Census Bureau, the city has a total area of 0.45 square miles (1.17 km^{2}), all land.

== Demographics ==
Historical populations
Year	Pop.	±%
1880	225	—
1890	153	−32.0%
1900	263	+71.9%
1910	226	−14.1%
1920	204	−9.7%
1930	171	−16.2%
1940	195	+14.0%
1950	183	−6.2%
1960	165	−9.8%
1970	140	−15.2%
1980	134	−4.3%
1990	164	+22.4%
2000	155	−5.5%
2010	148	−4.5%
2019	147	−0.7%
2020	129	−12.2%
Source:"U.S. Census website". United States Census Bureau. and Iowa Data Center; Source: U.S. Decennial Census

=== 2020 census ===
As of the census of 2020, there were 129 people, 64 households, and 38 families residing in the city. The population density was 286.2 inhabitants per square mile (110.5/km^{2}). There were 71 housing units at an average density of 157.5 per square mile (60.8/km^{2}). The racial makeup of the city was 97.7% White, 0.0% Black or African American, 0.0% Native American, 0.8% Asian, 0.0% Pacific Islander, 0.8% from other races and 0.8% from two or more races. Hispanic or Latino persons of any race comprised 0.8% of the population.

Of the 64 households, 26.6% of which had children under the age of 18 living with them, 43.8% were married couples living together, 4.7% were cohabitating couples, 28.1% had a female householder with no spouse or partner present and 23.4% had a male householder with no spouse or partner present. 40.6% of all households were non-families. 31.2% of all households were made up of individuals, 7.8% had someone living alone who was 65 years old or older.

The median age in the city was 51.8 years. 20.9% of the residents were under the age of 20; 3.1% were between the ages of 20 and 24; 19.4% were from 25 and 44; 36.4% were from 45 and 64; and 20.2% were 65 years of age or older. The gender makeup of the city was 48.1% male and 51.9% female.

=== 2010 census ===
As of the census of 2010, there were 148 people, 71 households, and 41 families living in the city. The population density was 328.9 inhabitants per square mile (127.0/km^{2}). There were 77 housing units at an average density of 171.1 per square mile (66.1/km^{2}). The racial makeup of the city was 99.3% White and 0.7% from two or more races.

There were 71 households, of which 19.7% had children under the age of 18 living with them, 46.5% were married couples living together, 8.5% had a female householder with no husband present, 2.8% had a male householder with no wife present, and 42.3% were non-families. 35.2% of all households were made up of individuals, and 9.8% had someone living alone who was 65 years of age or older. The average household size was 2.08 and the average family size was 2.63.

The median age in the city was 45.3 years. 15.5% of residents were under the age of 18; 7.6% were between the ages of 18 and 24; 26.4% were from 25 to 44; 39.2% were from 45 to 64; and 11.5% were 65 years of age or older. The gender makeup of the city was 51.4% male and 48.6% female.

=== 2000 census ===
As of the census of 2000, there were 155 people, 70 households, and 39 families living in the city. The population density was 392.4 inhabitants per square mile (151.5/km^{2}). There were 79 housing units at an average density of 200.0 per square mile (77.2/km^{2}). The racial makeup of the city was 99.35% White and 0.65% Native American.

There were 70 households, out of which 22.9% had children under the age of 18 living with them, 47.1% were married couples living together, 5.7% had a female householder with no husband present, and 42.9% were non-families. 32.9% of all households were made up of individuals, and 14.3% had someone living alone who was 65 years of age or older. The average household size was 2.21 and the average family size was 2.90.

In the city the population was spread out, with 21.9% under the age of 18, 7.1% from 18 to 24, 25.8% from 25 to 44, 25.8% from 45 to 64, and 19.4% who were 65 years of age or older. The median age was 42 years. For every 100 females, there were 101.3 males. For every 100 females age 18 and over, there were 101.7 males.

The median income for a household in the city was $25,795, and the median income for a family was $26,528. Males had a median income of $28,929 versus $27,917 for females. The per capita income for the city was $11,958. About 5.1% of families and 5.2% of the population were below the poverty line, including 8.8% of those under the age of eighteen and 5.9% of those 65 or over.

== Education ==
The Lynnville–Sully Community School District operates local public schools.

== Notable people ==
Searsboro is the hometown of Jeff Criswell, a former offensive lineman for the New York Jets and Kansas City Chiefs.

Franklin Bechly (1873-1965) was born in Searsboro. He became Iowa 6th District Judge, serving from 1927 to 1959.
