= Hephzibah Dumville Bechly =

- Born: Hephzibah Beulah Dumville; September 9, 1833; Lancashire, England
- Died: April 6, 1869 (aged 35); Poweshiek County, Iowa, U.S.
- Occupation: Author
- Known for: The Dumville Family Letters
- Spouse: Freiderich August Bechly
- Children: 2

Hephzibah Beulah Bechly (née Dumville; September 9, 1833 – April 6, 1869) was a writer who wrote about the life of common women in the pre-American Civil War era in the Midwest of the United States.

== Family life ==
Hephzibah Beulah Dumville was born in Lancashire, England to Thomas Dumville (1793-1842) and Ann Johnson (1795-1873). She emigrated to the United States with her parents and siblings, arriving in New York Harbor on September 16, 1840. The family settled on a farm in Macoupin County, Illinois where her father Thomas intended to form a colony. The venture failed when Thomas died in 1842, forcing the remaining family to move to find work. Life was difficult for Hephzibah, her mother Ann, and her sisters Elizabeth and Jemima; as was detailed in their writings.

== Marriage ==
She married Freiderich August Bechly on August 16, 1864, and relocated to farm in Poweshiek County, Iowa. Freiderich and Hephzibah had two children, Frederick William and Mary Elizabeth. Hephzibah died eleven months after the birth of her second child, and was buried in Iowa at Forest Home Cemetery.

== The Dumville Family Letters ==
The Dumville Family Letters are currently in the custody of the archives of the Abraham Lincoln Presidential Library. There are 117 letters in the collection that were written by Dumville family members, neighbors, Civil War soldiers, and Methodist clergy. The letters were written over the period 1851 through 1863. Most of the letters in the collection were written by Hephzibah Dumville.

What makes the Dumville Family letters important is that the letters reflect the trials and tribulations of a family of Midwestern women that lacked social status and economic means. Such primary sources that cover the lives of ordinary women in this time period are rare. The Dumville letters provide first-person accounts of the lives of ordinary Midwestern women from their own perspective. The Dumville letters act as a counterweight to the dominant elite and male perspective of the period. The writings of women in this period who lacked social status seldom survived.

== Bechly's thoughts and writings ==
Bechly wrote the majority of The Dumville Family Letters. In her writings, Bechly was concerned about her future, and how she should make decisions regarding work and career, as she viewed the two options as distinct. She thought and wrote about the benefits of education and intellectual development for her own situation. She contemplated and expressed in writing the purpose of marriage as it relates to romance, children, and financial security.

The degree of political understanding and outspokenness seen with Bechly's writings is unexpected for her time, as the general historical account would suggest that such political engagement would have been regarded as inappropriate.

== See also ==
- Feminism in the United States
- Abraham Lincoln Presidential Library
