= Don Dixon (musician) =

American record producer

- Born: December 13, 1950 (age 75); Lancaster, South Carolina, U.S.
- Genres: Alternative country; rock; folk; jangle pop
- Occupations: Record producer; musician; songwriter
- Instruments: Bass guitar; vocals
- Years active: 1980s–present
- Labels: Enigma; Capitol; Gadfly; 123; Arcade; Sugar Hill; Dixon Archival Remnants

Donald Allen Dixon (born December 13, 1950) is an American record producer and musician. He is considered to be one of the key producers of what is called the jangle pop movement of the early 1980s, including working with R.E.M. and the Smithereens.

== Early life ==
Dixon was born in Lancaster, South Carolina. He says he learned to play the bass guitar in junior high school "because of the control that it offered". He said, "I bought a bass, one of those great Danelectro Silvertones, and I wish I had it back. From Sears for $79. Then a few months later I really liked upright, so I found an old upright in a church in Charlotte, and just was sort of self-taught on those things, but I could read music." At the age of fifteen, he made his first recording, playing upright bass with jazz musician Louis McGloughn in Charlotte, North Carolina. He also sang in church.

Dixon attended the University of North Carolina at Chapel Hill (UNC-Chapel Hill), where his roommate was the writer Bruce Brooks.

== Career ==
=== Arrogance ===
Dixon and several fellow freshmen at the UNC-Chapel Hill formed the band Arrogance. He shared lead vocals, played the bass, and also wrote songs. Arrogance recorded six albums and helped create a local music scene. Before breaking up in 1983, Arrogance became North Carolina's top local act. Dixon spent thirteen years as a member of Arrogance and learned the essence of record production during this time, producing all of the band's independent albums. He says, "Even though Arrogance never made it big nationally, we did play all over the eastern part of the country and we did release six albums. In fact, we really did help pioneer the independent approach to putting out albums in the '70s. ...We took it upon ourselves to play original music in clubs, to force club owners and audiences to realize that new music doesn't have to come from someplace else."

=== Producer ===
Dixon was working as an engineer at Charlotte's Reflection Sound Studios in the mid-1970s. His first production credit was on a 1973 album by Michael Greer; he received both production and engineering credit on the 1975 album Cuttin' Loose by local group Brotherhood of Peace. He continued work as a producer with local acts while maintaining a parallel career as a musician. Dixon was still playing with Arrogance in 1982 when Mitch Easter asked him to co-produce R.E.M.'s debut LP Murmur (1983) and their 1984 follow–up LP Reckoning. Dixon and Easter are credited in the Reckoning liner notes as "Machinists". Dixon says, "We thought R.E.M. had a neat, unique thing, and we wanted to protect it and allow it to grow without putting it in that pressure to sell as many records as possible. We didn't feel we had to change their arrangements that much, because they were eccentric enough already. We did add an underpinning, a substrata to hold it together and make it sound like something more than just another guitar, bass and drums band. There's all kinds of found art on those records: slowed-down tapes of them playing pool, noises coming in and out, additional guitars. It's not like we sat around and talked about it for months; we did it as we did it, which is still my approach to producing."

Dixon then spent several years producing artists such as Chris Stamey (formerly of the dB's), the Smithereens, Fetchin Bones, Richard Barone (formerly of the Bongos), Guadalcanal Diary, and Marshall Crenshaw. Tommy Keene's Run Now EP is considered to be a highlight of this era of Dixon's work.

Dixon met with Nirvana as a potential producer for Nevermind. According to Dixon, both the label and the band were agreeable to the collaboration. Dixon said, "I loved these demos that he [Gary Gersh of Geffen Records] sent me and I flew out days after I got my first cassette. They still didn't have words for 'Smells Like Teen Spirit.' 'Lithium' was done and it was almost exactly like it is on the record. They sent me four or five songs, I loved them and I thought it was great. So I went out and spent some time in Tacoma. It looked like it was going to happen and then I asked for too much money—well, me and my people did." However, Dixon concludes, "I was really sad that I didn't get to make the record, because I liked those songs, but I think Butch [Vig] probably made a better record than I would have. I wouldn't have made him doubletrack his voice."

Working with Easter at Fidelitorium Recordings in Kernersville, North Carolina, Dixon produced Mixed Reality, the sixth studio album by American alternative rock band Gin Blossoms. It was released on June 15, 2018, on Cleopatra Records.

=== Solo artist ===
Dixon became a solo performer in 1983. In 1985, success as a producer led to Dixon's solo debut Most of the Girls Like to Dance but Only Some of the Boys Like To, a collection of early demos. This album reflected his love of classic pop melodies and spiky, Nick Lowe-inspired word play. In 1987, Dixon recorded Romeo at Juilliard described as Big Star–style power pop. Chi-Town Budget Show (1988) was a recording of a Chicago's Park West nightclub broadcast. In 1989, his album EEE featured the Uptown Horns.

In 1992 Restless Records released a Don Dixon "Best Of" album entitled (If) I'm A Ham, Well You're A Sausage. In 1995, after taking time off to raise a family, Dixon released Romantic Depressive, a somewhat darker–themed album. In 1996, he produced the original cast recording of King Mackerel & The Blues Are Running (Songs And Stories of the Carolina Coast) which featured Bland Simpson (Red Clay Ramblers) and author/composer Jim Wann.

After four years, he released The Invisible Man (2000), an album about mortality, with songs from the viewpoints of people of various ages. Note Pad #38 in 2001 was an odds–and–ends collection of unreleased material from his solo career. In 2006, he released The Entire Combustible World in One Small Room, a concept album revolving around rooms in a house. In 2014, Dixon released High & Filthy & Borderline, based on the lives of a male and a female assassin.

=== Collaborations ===
Dixon and wife Marti Jones released the download-only album Lucky Stars: New Lullabies for Old Souls in 2008. A departure from their previous sound, this project began as a request from a friend who was putting together an album of lullabies to sell in hospitals to new parents. The album featured six songs with vocals and five instrumentals.

Although Dixon and his wife Marti Jones have collaborated on each other's albums for years, in 2011 they released Living Stereo, their first proper duet album. On June 23, 2011, they played a five-song set together on NPR's Mountain Stage. Dixon says, "It's really a pleasure working with Marti because we have a lot of common sensibilities. When we get a nice creative thing going, it keeps on going without little stumbling blocks. It ends up being challenging without being frustrating."

In 2008, Dixon released The Nu-Look with The Jump Rabbits, his bandmates of more than 20 years: Jamie Hoover of The Spongetones and Jim Brock.

Around 2009, Dixon began playing bass with Mary Chapin Carpenter's touring band.

=== Acting ===
- Dixon played an alcoholic composer in Todd Graff's 2003 film Camp.
- Dixon appeared onstage in the musical King Mackerel & the Blues Are Running: Songs & Stories of the North Carolina Coast, co-created with Jim Wann (Pump Boys and Dinettes) and Bland Simpson (Red Clay Ramblers).

== Publications ==
In 2009, a book of his song lyrics, Songs 101: the Lyrics of Don Dixon, was published by VanZeno Press.

== Personal life ==
While producing for A&M Records, Dixon met singer/artist Marti Jones who was from Uniontown, Ohio. Dixon said, "We became friends while working on her first album, Unsophisticated Time. Good platonic friends, not just professional friends. Later on, after that first record was released, I realized that I wanted to be with her all the time." They married in 1988. The couple have a daughter, born in 1991. The family lives in Canton, Ohio.

In 2001, Dixon suffered a heart attack while running with his wife near their home in Canton. As he was uninsured, having purposely let it lapse a few months earlier, Dixon incurred a sizeable medical bill from his hospital visit. In July 2001, an R.E.M. tribute show at Cat's Cradle in Carrboro, North Carolina, doubled as a benefit for Dixon, to help defray the medical costs.

== Discography ==
=== Studio albums ===
- 1985: Most of the Girls Like to Dance but Only Some of the Boys Like To (Enigma Records)
- 1987: Romeo at Juilliard (Enigma Records)
- 1989: EEE (Enigma Records)
- 1995: Romantic Depressive (Sugar Hill Records)
- 2000: The Invisible Man (Gadfly Records)
- 2006: The Entire Combustible World in One Small Room (125 Records)
- 2010: Don Dixon Sings the Jeffords Brothers (Arcade Records)
- 2014: High & Filthy & Borderline (Dixon Archival Remnants Records)

=== Compilations ===
- 1992: (If) I'm a Ham, Well You're a Sausage (Restless Records)
- 2001: Note Pad #38 (Dixon Archival Remnants Records)

=== Live album ===
- 1988: Chi-Town Budget Show (Restless Records)

=== Arrogance ===
- 1973: Give Us a Break (Reflection Sound Studio)
- 1975: Prolepsis (Reflection Sound Studio)
- 1976: Rumors (Vanguard Records)
- 1981: Lively (Moonlight Records)
- 1980: Suddenly (Warner Bros.)
- 2002: The 5'11" Record (Gaff Music)

=== Don Dixon and Marti Jones ===
- 2008: Lucky Stars: New Lullabies for Old Souls (Lava Head Music)
- 2011: Living Stereo (Dixon Archival Remnants Records)

=== Don Dixon & the Jump Rabbits ===
- 2008: Nu-Look (Dixon Archival Remnants Records)

=== Performs on ===
- 1979: Mike Cross – Bounty Hunter (Sugar Hill Records)
- 1983: Chris Stamey – It's a Wonderful Life (DB Records)
- 1984: Beat Rodeo – Staying Out Late with...Beat Rodeo (I.R.S. Records)
- 1985: Marti Jones – Unsophisticated Time (A&M Records)
- 1985: The Windbreakers – Terminal (Mark Records/Minotauro)
- 1985: Marti Jones – Match Game (A&M Records)
- 1986: Dumptruck – Positively Dumptruck (Enigima Records)
- 1986: The Golden Palominos – Blast of Silence (Charly Records)
- 1986: Welcome to Comboland (Making Waves)
- 1986: The Smithereens – Especially for You (Enigma Records)
- 1986: Mathew Sweet – Inside (Columbia Records)
- 1987: Marshall Crenshaw – Mary Jean & 9 Others (Warner Bros.)
- 1988: Marti Jones – Used Guitars (A&M Records)
- 1989: Mike Cross – Prodigal Son (Sugar Hill Records)
- 1990: Mary Chapin Carpenter – Shooting Straight in the Dark (Columbia)
- 1990: Richard Barone – Primal Dream (Line Records)
- 1990: Marti Jones – Any Kind of Lie (RCA Records)
- 1991: Chris Stamey – Fireworks (Rhino Records)
- 1993: Kim Carnes – Gypsy Honeymoon: Best of Kim Carnes (EMI)
- 1993: Michael McDermott – Gethersmane (SBK Records)
- 1994: Mary Chapin Carpenter – Stones in the Road (Columbia Records)
- 1994: The Moody Brothers – Guitar Boogie (Lamon Records)
- 1995: James McMurtry – Where'd You Hide the Body (Columbia/Sony)
- 1996: Marti Jones – Live at Spirit Square (Sugar Hill Records)
- 1996: Marti Jones – My Long Haired Life (Sugar Hill Records)
- 2020: King Mackerel & The Blues Are Running (Sugar Hill Records)
- 1997: Pat DiNizio – Songs and Sounds (Velvet Records)
- 1998: Kyle Davis – Raising Heroes (N2K Encoded Music)
- 1999: astroPuppees – Pet (High Tone Records)
- 1999: Robert Crenshaw – Full-Length Stereo Recordings (Gadfly)
- 1999: The Smithereens – God Save the Smithereens (Koch Records)
- 2000: Mark Bryan – Thirty on the Rail (Atlantic Records)
- 2000: Robert Crenshaw – Victory Songs (Gadfly)
- 2000: Kyle Davis – Don't Tell the World (KIk Records)
- 2000: Ruth Gerson – Fools & Kings (The Orchard)
- 2000: Carrie Newcomer – The Age of Possibility (Rounder Records)
- 2000: The Pinetops – Above Ground and Vertical (Soundproof/Monolyth)
- 2001: The Orange Humble Band – Humblin' Across America (Half A Cow)
- 2001: Red Clay Ramblers – Yonder (RCA)
- 2002: Marti Jones – My Tidy Doily Dream (Dixon Archival Records)
- 2003: Caitlyn Cary – I'm Staying Out (YEP Rock Records)
- 2003: Robert Crenshaw – Dog Dreams (Gadfly)
- 2003: Dottie Pearson – A House Made of Love (Grapevine)
- 2004: Bill Lloyd – Back to Even (New Boss Sounds)
- 2004: Carrie Newcomer – Bettie's Diner: The Best of Carrie Newcomer (Rounder Select)
- 2004: Jeff O'Kelley - Just Passing Through (Buddy Dog Records)
- 2004: Bishop Leonard Scott – Hymns for the Nations (Tyscot Records)
- 2004: Chris Stamey – Travels in the South (Yep Roc/Orange)
- 2005: astroPuppees – Sugar Beat (Manatee Records)
- 2005: Jeffrey Dean Foster – Million Star Hotel (Angel Skull Records)
- 2006: Michael Stanley – American Road (ItsAboutMusic)
- 2006: Volatile Baby – Traveling Lights (SilverMeteor)
- 2007: Angel and the Love Mongers – The Humanist Queen (Rock Snob)
- 2007: The Nomads – Evolution (A&R Recording)
- 2007: GB Leighton – Shake Them Ghosts (CC Entertainment / MTM Music)
- 2007: Patrick Park – Everyone's in Everyone (Curb Appeal Records)
- 2007: Carey Sims – Wheels
- 2008: Bell & Cooper – Postcards Out of the Blue (Dogjaw)
- 2008: Otis Gibbs – Grandpa Walked a Picketline (Wannamaker)
- 2008: Robin Schaffer – Hillbilly Fever (New Rounder)
- 2008: Michael Stanley – The Soft Addictions (Its All About Music)
- 2009: Rebecca Rippy – Telling Stories (DV)
- 2010: Sid Selvidge – I Should Be Blue (Archer Records)
- 2010: Kelley Ryan – Twist (CD Baby/Manatee Records)
- 2012: A Fragile Tomorrow – Be Nice Be Careful (Piewillie)
- 2013: The Del Shannon Tribute: Songwriter, vol. 1 (Rockbeat Records)
- 2013: Michael Stanley – The Ride (Its About Music)
- 2018: The Sounds of Summer, Vol. 1 (Beat)
- 2019: Chris Stamey – New Songs for the 20th Century (Omnivore Recordings)
- 2020: For the Record: A Tribute to John Wicks (Kool Kat Musik)
- 2021:Yesterday's Tomorrow: Celebrating the Winston-Salem Sound (Omnivore Recordings)

== Production credits ==
=== As producer ===
Artist	Title	Label	Year	Reference
Rod Abernethy	Solo	Avanti		
The Accelerators	Leave My Heart	Dolphin Records	1983	
The Accelerators	The Accelerators	Profile Records	1987	
Chris Allen	Goodbye Girl and the Big Apple Circus	Rosa		
Chris Allen	Things Unbroken	Rosa		
Mark & Micah Atkinson	Land of Broken Angels	Independent	2017	
The Backsliders	Southern Lines	Mammoth Records	1999	
John Bare	Lassie James Songbook Vol. I		2019	
Richard Barone	Primal Dream	Paradox/MCA Records	1990	
Matt Barrett	The Ruse	Moonlight		
Beat Rodeo	Staying Out Late with Beat Rodeo	Zensor/IRS		
Bell & Cooper	Forty Words for Fear	Gaff	2003	
Bell & Cooper	Postcards Out of the Blue	Dogjaw	2008	
Jim Brock	Tropic Affaire	Reference	1989	
Brotherhood Of Peace	Cuttin' Loose	Avanti Records	1976	
Mark Bryan	30 On A Rail	Atlantic Records	2000	
The Buzz of Delight	Sound Castles	DB Records	1984	
Kim Carnes	Gypsy Honeymoon	EMI	1993	
The Carpenter Ants	Picnic with the Lord	Alpo Records	2000	
The Carpenter Ants	Insect Ball	Alpo Records	2004	
The Carpenter Ants	Ants in Your Pants	Alpo Records	2005	
The Carpenter Ants	Ants & Uncles	Alpo Records	2012	
Andrew Cash	Boomtown	Island Canada	1989	
David Childers and the Modern Don Juans	Room 23	Silver Meteor/Ramseur Records	2011	
David Childers	Run Skeleton Run	Ramseur Records	2017	
John Cody		Duke Street Records/MCA Canada	2012	
The Connells	Darker Days	TVT Records	1985	
Contenders	The Contenders	Gadfly	2002	
Marshall Crenshaw	Mary Jean & 9 Others	Warner Bros.	1987	
Kyle Davis	Raising Heroes	N2K Encoded Music	1998	
Pat DiNizio	Songs And Sounds	VelVel/BMG Records	1997	
Don Dixon	Most of The Girls Like To Dance...But Only Some of the Boys Do	Mega DK / Demon UK / Enigma US	1985	
Don Dixon	Romeo at Juilliard	Enigma Records	1987	
Don Dixon	Chi-Town Budget Show	Enigma Records	1988	
Don Dixon	EEE	Enigma Records	1989	
Don Dixon	If I'm a Ham, Well You're a Sausage	Restless Records	1993	
Don Dixon	Notepad #38	Dixon Archival Records	2001	
Don Dixon	The Entire Combustible World in One Small Room	125 Records	2006	
Dumptruck	Positively Dumptruck	Enigma Records	1986	
The Edison Project	Do You Remember Rock and Rock?	Edison Project	2007	
emmet swimming	Arlington To Boston	Epic Records/Sony	1996	
The Fabulous Knobs	The Fabulous Knobs	Moonlight	1980	
Fast Annie	Unsafe at Any Speed	Chelsea Records	1976	
Dip Ferrell	Unplugged House Party	CB Baby / Patman & Robin	2012	
Dip Ferrell & The Truetones	Central Avenue	Arcade Records	2009	
Fetchin Bones	Cabin Flounder	DB Records	1984	
Fetchin Bones	Bad Pumpkin	Capitol	1985	
Fetchin Bones	Galaxie 500	DB Records / Capitol	1987	
Moxy Früvous	Thornhill	Bottom Line / BMG Records	1999	
Ruth Gerson	Fools & Kings	Orc	2000	
Gin Blossoms	Mixed Reality	Cleopatra Records	2018	
The Graphic	People in Glass	Dolphin Music	1984	
Greer	Between Two Worlds	Sugarbush	1973	
Guadalcanal Diary	Walking in the Shadow of the Big Man	DB Records	1984	
Guadalcanal Diary	2x4	Elektra	1987	
Guadalcanal Diary	Flip-Flop	Elektra	1989	
The Hangups	Second Story	Restless Records / BMG Records	1999	
Hey Mavis	Red Wine	Self-Release	2010	
Hey Mavis	Honey Man	Self-Release	2013	
Mary Hott & The Carpenter Ants	Devil in the Hills: Coal Country Reckoning	Mary Hott	2021	
Hootie & the Blowfish	"City By A River"			
Hootie & the Blowfish	Scattered Covered & Smothered	Atlantic Records	2000	
Hootie & the Blowfish	"Use Me"	Atlantic Records	2000	
In Tua Nua	The Long Acre	Virgin UK	1988	
Marti Jones	Unsophisticated Time	A&M Records	1985	
Marti Jones	Match Game	A&M Records	1986	
Marti Jones	Used Guitars	A&M Records	1988	
Marti Jones	Any Kind of Lie	RCA Records	1990	
Marti Jones	Live at Spirit Square	Sugar Hill Records	1996	
Marti Jones	My Long-Haired Life	Sugar Hill Records	1996	
Marti Jones	My Tidy Doily Dream	Dixon Archival Remnants	2002	
Tommy Keene	Places That Are Gone	Dolphin Music	1984	
Tommy Keene	Back Again...Try	Dolphin Music	1984	
Tommy Keene	Songs from the Film	Geffen Records	1986	
Tommy Keene	Run Now	Geffen Records	1986	
Tommy Keene	The Real Underground	Alias Records	1993	
Tommy Keene	Tommy Keene You Hear Me: A Retrospective 1983 – 2009	Second Motion Records	2010	
The Killer Whales	The Killer Whales	Moonlight	1981	
Kevin Lee	Resless	MCA	1993	
GB Leighton	Shake Them Ghosts	CC Entertainment / MTM Music	2007	
Let's Active	Cypress	IRS	1984	
Little Eden	Back to...Little Eden	Parlophone / Warner	2012	
Michael McDermott	Gethsemane	SBK	1993	
James McMurtry	Where'd You Hide The Body	Columbia/Sony	1995	
Jeff O'Kelley	Just Passing Through	Buddy Dog Records	2004	
Dottie Pearson	A House Made of Love	Grapevine	2003	
The Pinetops	Above Ground And Vertical	Soundproof/Monolyth	2000	
The Pressure Boys	Rangledoon	Root-a-Doot	1984	
Red Clay Ramblers	Yonder	RCR Records	2001	
The Reivers	Saturday	DB/Capitol	1987	
R.E.M.	Murmur	I.R.S. Records	1983	
R.E.M.	Reckoning	I.R.S. Records	1984	
R.E.M.	Dead Letter Office	I.R.S. Records	1987	
R.E.M.	Eponymous	I.R.S. Records	1988	
R.E.M.	Part Lies, Part Heart, Part Truth, Part Garbage: 1982 – 2011	Warner Bros.	2011	
Rosavelt	The Story of Gasoline	Gaff	2004	
Kelley Ryan	Twist	CB Baby / Manatee	2010	
Kelley Ryan	Telescope	Manatee Records	2017	
Sid Selvidge	I Should Be Blue	Archer Records	2010	
Bland Simpson	Follow You All Over the World	Gaff	2003	
The Smithereens	Especially for You	Enigma	1986	
The Smithereens	Green Thoughts	Capitol	1988	
The Smithereens	A Date with the Smithereens	RCA	1994	
The Smithereens	Attack of the Smithereens	Capital	1995	
The Smithereens	God Save the Smithereens	Velvet / Koch	1999	
The Smithereens	From Jersey It Came! The Smithereens Anthology	Capital	2004	
The Smithereens	2011	E1 Music	2011	
Snagglepuss	The Country Club Sessions		2001	
Snagglepuss	Parading Around in the Altogether	Coolidge Records	2003	
Snagglepus	The Sound Report	Coolidge Records	2007	
Sneakers	Sneakers	Carnivorous	1976	
Sneakers	In The Red	Carnivorous	1978	
Sneakers	Nonsequitur of Silence	Collector's Choice Music	2007	
The Spongetones	Where-Ever-Land	Permanent Press Records	1987	
Treva Spontaine	S'il Vous Plait	Moonlight	1982	
Chris Stamey	It's a Wonderful Life	DB Records	1983	
Chris Stamey	Instant Excitement	Coyote / TwinTone / A & M	1984	
Surfaholics	Tiki-A-Go-Go	Pixler Discs	2020	
Matthew Sweet	Inside	Columbia	1986	
Treva	Better Late than Never	Avert	1999	
US Secret Service	US Secret Service	Moonlight	1980	
Volatile Baby	Traveling Light	SilverMeteor	2006	
Jim Wann	Sings Johnny Mercer; Pardon My Southern Accent vol 1	Creekmore	2002	
Wednesday Week	What We Had	Enigma	1987	
The Windbreakers	Terminal	Mark Records / Minotauro	1985	
X-teens	Big Boy's Dream	Moonlight	1980	
X-teens	Eponymous	Dolphin Music	1982	
X-teens	Love & Politics	Dolphin Music	1984	
Original Cast Recording	King Mackerel & The Blues Are Running	Sugar Hill Records	1996	
various artists	Jesus: The Epic Mini-series (soundtrack)	Sparrow / Capitol	2000	
various artists	Four Decades of Folk Music	Time-Life Music	2007	
various artists	A Very Special Christmas Playlist Plus	Hip O Records / Universal	2008	
various artists	The Del Shannon Tribute: Song Writer, vol. 1	Rockbeat Records	2013	
various artists	Strum & Thum: The American Jangle Underground 1983–1987	Captured Tracks	2021	

=== Additional credits ===
Artist	Title	Label, Other notes	Date	Contribution	Reference
Arrogance	Rumors	Vanguard Records	1976	arrangements	
Arrogance	Suddenly	Warner Bros.	1980	engineer	
Arrogance	The 5'11" Record	Gaff Music	2002	engineer	
austroPuppees	You Win the Bride	Hightone	1996	engineer, mixing	
John Bare	Lassie James Songbook Vol. I		2019	composer	
Blood Incarnation	Timewave Zero	Century Media Records	2022	cover art	
Bop Dead	Where Robots Go to Die	Fishhead Records	1997	mixing	
Rosanne Cash	She Remembers Everything	Blue Note Records	2018	photography	
David Clayton-Thomas	A Blues for the New World	ILS Group	2013	cover photo	
David Clayton-Thomas	Canadiana	Antoinette / Linus Entertainment	2016	photography	
Joe Cocker	Night Calls	Capital Records	1992	composer	
Joe Cocker	Heart & Soul	EMI	2004	composer	
Marshall Crenshaw	Live: My Truck is My Home	Razor & Tie	1994	composer	
Counting Crows	August and Everything After: Live at Town Hall	Eagle Records	2011	composer	
Mike Cross	Bounty Hunter	Sugar Hill Records	1979	engineer, remixer	
Escape from Earth	Three Seconds Test	Cupcake	2004	cover art	
Feedbag	Stickfigure	Monolyth	1998	mixer	
Gee Dawg 'n' Joe Boy	They Don't Understand	Menace Entertainment	1996	engineer	
The Golden Palominos	Blast of Silence	Charly Records	1986	composer	
The Golden Palominos	Surrealistic Surfer	Dressed to Kill	2001	composer	
The Golden Palominos	Run Pony Run: An Essential Collection	Full 2000	2002	composer	
Michael Kaeshammer	Something New	Linus Records	2018	photography	
Michael Kaeshammer	No Filter	Idia	2017	photography	
Fred Koller	Sweet Baby Fred	Appaloosa	1998	composer	
Bill Mulls	Dreamland	The Orchard	1999	composer	
Amy Rigby	Little Fugitive	Signature Sounds Recordings	2005	audio engineer, mixing	
Robin Rogers	Treat Me Right	Blind Pig Records	2008	horn arrangements	
Ronnie Spector	Unfinished Business	Lemon Recordings	1987	composer	
The Spongetones	Odd Fellows	Gadfly Records	2000	sequences	
Sally Spring	Made of Starrs	Sniffinpup Record	2010	tray photographs	
Sue Thompson	Golden Classic	Collectibles	1995	composer	
Daniel Whittington	Taking You Home	Daniel Whittington / Rhodes	2010	mixing	
