= Silent Tongue =

1993 film

- Directed by: Sam Shepard
- Written by: Sam Shepard
- Produced by: Ludi Boeken
- Starring: Alan Bates; Richard Harris; Dermot Mulroney; River Phoenix; Sheila Tousey; Jeri Arredondo; Bill Irwin; David Shiner; Tim Scott; Tantoo Cardinal
- Music by: Patrick O'Hearn
- Production companies: Le Studio Canal+ Belbo; Alive Productions
- Distributed by: Trimark Pictures (North America); Entertainment Film Distributors (United Kingdom); Le Studio Canal+ (Overseas)
- Release dates: January 28, 1993 (Sundance Film Festival); February 1, 1994 (Theatrical premiere)
- Running time: 102 minutes
- Countries: United States; United Kingdom; France; Netherlands
- Languages: English; French; Dutch
- Budget: $8.5 million
- Box office: $61,274

Silent Tongue is a 1993 American horror Western film written and directed by Sam Shepard. It was filmed in the spring of 1992 and premiered at the Sundance Film Festival on January 28, 1993 but not released theatrically until a year later in 1994. It was filmed near Roswell, New Mexico and features Richard Harris, Sheila Tousey, Alan Bates, Dermot Mulroney and River Phoenix.

== Plot ==
The film is about a young man named Talbot Roe (Phoenix), who has gone insane over the death of his wife. Talbot's father, Prescott Roe (Harris) feels his son's pain and wants to find him a new wife. He goes back to the place where he bought Talbot's first wife, from Eamon McCree (Bates). He finds the dead wife's sister (Arredondo), who is a champion horse rider and Mr. McCree's daughter, which makes her only half-Indian.

Roe asks McCree if he could have his last daughter for his son, but McCree refuses. Then, Roe kidnaps her and tries to get her to help him, and she takes the deal for gold and four horses. But Talbot is not taking any chances for her. He is too afraid that she will try to take his wife's corpse from him. And for the last few nights, he sees the ghost of his dead wife. She wants him to destroy her corpse, but he refuses.

== Cast ==
- Richard Harris as Prescott Roe
- Sheila Tousey as Awbonnie / Ghost
- Alan Bates as Eamon McCree
- River Phoenix as Talbot Roe
- Dermot Mulroney as Reeves McCree
- Jeri Arredondo as Velada McCree
- Tantoo Cardinal as Silent Tongue
- Jill Momaday as Prostitute
- Bill Irwin as Comic
- David Shiner as Straight Man
- Tommy Thompson as Medicine Show Band Performer
- Jack Herrick as Medicine Show Band Performer
- Bland Simpson as Medicine Show Band Performer
- Clay Buckner as Medicine Show Band Performer
- Chris Frank as Medicine Show Band Performer
- Arturo Gil as Little Person Acrobat #1
- Timothy Scott as The Lone Man

== Production ==
Sam Shepard was inspired to write Silent Tongue after researching medicine shows and the gullible idea of a magic potion or cure all. Shepard's script for Silent Tongue found its way to producer, Gene Rosow, with Shepard's editor, Bill Yahraus, telling Rosow the story at a Passover seder at Rosow's home. Rosow was impressed by the story and took the project to Ludi Boeken of French production company Belbo Films who helped secure financing from Groupe Canal+ and Hachette Premiere. Following the film's initial showing at the 1993 Sundance Film Festival, Shepard re-edited the movie.

== Delay in release ==
The film was shot in 1992 and premiered at the Sundance Film Festival on January 28, 1993 but its release was delayed until early 1994, marking the penultimate film appearance of River Phoenix who died four months before its release. It was the final film to feature Phoenix for 19 years until the release of his unfinished film Dark Blood in 2012.

The film opened in the United Kingdom on January 27, 1995 on just one screen, grossing £832 for the weekend.

== Reception ==
On Rotten Tomatoes, the film holds an approval rating of 38% based on 16 reviews, with a weighted average rating of 4.9/10. Peter Travers from Rolling Stone awarded the film 4/4 stars, calling it "a demanding chunk of Shepard frontier poetry that shuns pretty-boy posturing". Film critics Siskel & Ebert both disliked the film and included it on their Worst of 1994 show; Ebert in particular claimed that "I've seen whole movies that seemed shorter than the last half hour of Silent Tongue" and ridiculed its plot.

== See also ==
- List of ghost films
