= Romantic Depressive =

Studio album by Don Dixon
- Released: 1995
- Label: Sugar Hill
- Producer: Mark Williams, Don Dixon

Don Dixon chronology
(If) I'm a Ham, Well You're a Sausage (1992)	Romantic Depressive (1995)	The Invisible Man (2000)

Romantic Depressive is an album by the American musician Don Dixon, released in 1995 via Sugar Hill Records. The album was part of an attempt by Sugar Hill to expand its roster beyond a traditional acoustic style. Dixon supported the album with a North American tour that included shows opening for Hootie & the Blowfish. Romantic Depressive was nominated for a NAIRD Indie Award.

== Production ==
Produced by Mark Williams and Dixon, the songs were recorded over a period of four years. Dixon pulled from a pool of 30 songs. He played most of the instruments. The first half of the album is about romantic relationships; Dixon considered turning Romantic Depressive into a kind of concept album. "Lottery of Lives" is about the military draft. "Good Golly Svengali" is an instrumental. "25,000 Days" was cowritten by Marti Jones, Dixon's wife; Sugar Hill had originally wanted an album of Dixon-Jones duets. Bland Simpson played piano on "I Should Know Better".

== Critical reception ==
Professional ratings
Review scores
Source	Rating
AllMusic	4/5 stars
The Charlotte Observer	2/4 stars
MusicHound Rock: The Essential Album Guide	3.5/5 stars
USA Today	3/4 stars

USA Today praised Dixon's "well-crafted songs and bluesy, Southern-soul rasp." The Santa Fe New Mexican called the album "a tuneful journey through the convolutions of a gently twisted sensibility," writing that "the real genius of these songs is how deceptively simple they seem." The St. Louis Post-Dispatch determined that "Dixon once again fashions a sound that mixes the melodic qualities of Beatles-styled pop, the gritty groove of soul and a bit of country twang." Stereo Review stated that "Dixon's subject matter is evenly divided between doleful reminiscences about love's labors and reflections on himself and the world from the vantage point of midlife." The Charlotte Observer opined that "the songs are too laid-back."

AllMusic noted that "everything here sheds new light on old traditions ... the sound is dense without being muddy, snappy without being shallow." The Star-Gazette listed the album among the 10 best of 1995. In 2008, the Pittsburgh City Paper deemed Romantic Depressive "old-school soul-pop."

== Track listing ==
No.	Title	Length
1.	"Righteous Side of Love"
2.	"Giving Up the Ghost"
3.	"I Should Know Better"
4.	"Angel Angel"
5.	"Everytime I Think of Home"
6.	"What You Saw"
7.	"Peace for the Last Time"
8.	"Good Golly Svengali"
9.	"25,000 Days"
10.	"Lottery of Lives"
11.	"Never Slow Down"
