= PMT =

PMT may refer to:

== Technology and engineering ==
- Pole-mount transformer
- Padmount transformer
- Photomultiplier tube, a light detector

== Medicine ==
- Premenstrual tension
- Pacemaker-mediated tachycardia, caused by artificial pacemaker
- Pasteurella multocida toxin

== Political parties ==
- Malian Party of Labour (le Parti malien du travail)
- Mexican Workers' Party (Partido Mexicano de los Trabajadores)

== Transport ==
- PMTair, Cambodian airline, ICAO code
- Polmont railway station, Scotland, National Rail station code
- First Potteries Limited, formerly PMT Ltd, UK bus company
- Pune Municipal Transport, merged into Pune Mahanagar Parivahan Mahamandal Limited, India

== Other uses ==
- Packaging Machinery Technology, a magazine
- Pardon My Take, a comedy sports podcast
- Parent Management Training
- PMT Dance Studio, of New York City, US
- PMT Italia, a paper machinery company
- Professional Music Technology, a UK musical instrument retailer
- Program Map Table in an MPEG transport stream
- Protection motivation theory
- Proto-Manchu–Tungus, another name for the Proto-Tungusic language
- Physics and Maths tutor, a revision website
