= Used Guitars =

Studio album by Marti Jones
- Released: 1988
- Label: A&M
- Producer: Don Dixon

Marti Jones chronology
Match Game (1986)	Used Guitars (1988)	Any Kind of Lie (1990)

Used Guitars is an album by the American musician Marti Jones, released in 1988. Jones supported the album by playing shows that included many of the album's guest musicians. The album was a commercial disappointment, and A&M Records dropped Jones shortly after its release.

== Production ==
Recorded over five weeks in Charlotte, North Carolina, the album was produced by Don Dixon. Jones described Used Guitars as a concept album about women discussing the nature of love. Marshall Crenshaw, the Uptown Horns, and Mitch Easter contributed to the album.

Jones and Dixon cowrote three of the album's songs. Janis Ian wrote two songs. "Each Time" is a cover of the Jackie DeShannon song. Sonny Landreth played dobro on "If I Can Love Somebody". "Tourist Town" is about a squabble with a boyfriend.

== Critical reception ==
Professional ratings
Review scores
Source	Rating
AllMusic	4.5/5 stars
Chicago Sun-Times	3.5/4 stars
Robert Christgau	C+
MusicHound Rock: The Essential Album Guide	4/5 stars
The Philadelphia Inquirer	3/4 stars
The Rolling Stone Album Guide	4/5 stars

The Washington Post wrote that Jones "still isn't really an interpretive, emotive singer, [but] has a distinctive sound and has never appeared so confident and risk-taking." The Philadelphia Inquirer praised Jones's "crystalline vocal testimony."The New York Times opined that Jones "has one of those flexible, innately emotional voices that, with only the most minor adjustments in inflection, can accommodate rock, country, pop-soul and sophisticated torch music with equal facility."

The Ottawa Citizen concluded that "Jones twists folk music into the new shapes necessary to make it a pertinent music form again." The Houston Chronicle deemed Jones "a spooky cross between Dusty Springfield and Joni Mitchell." Robert Christgau regarded the Graham Parker cover to be the album's best song. The Kingston Whig-Standard considered the album to be among the best of 1988.

== Track listing ==
Side one

No.	Title	Writer(s)	Length
1.	"Tourist Town"	Don Dixon, Marti Jones	2:43
2.	"Wind in the Trees"	Bland Simpson	3:03
3.	"The Real One"	John Hiatt	4:00
4.	"Ruby"	Janis Ian, Kye Fleming	4:26
5.	"Back of the Line"	Dixon, Jones	4:29

Side two

No.	Title	Writer(s)	Length
1.	"Twisted Vines"	Dixon, Jones	3:30
2.	"Keep Me in the Dark"	Ian, Fleming	3:17
3.	"You Can’t Take Love for Granted"	Graham Parker	3:43
4.	"I Don’t Want Him (Anymore)"	David Enloe	3:22
5.	"Each Time"	Jackie DeShannon	2:30
6.	"If I Can Love Somebody"	Hiatt	3:16
