= Stefan Haves =

American clown and theatre director (born 1958)

- Born: December 20, 1958 (age 67); Los Angeles, California, U.S.
- Occupations: Actor, comedian, clown, theatre director
- Website: stefanhaves.com

Stefan Haves (born December 20, 1958) is an American actor, theatre director, comedian and clown.

== History ==
Born and raised in Los Angeles, Haves acted in television as a teenager.

Haves attended California State University and Brandeis University, while at Brandies he joined the ‘Dell Arte Players. He studied theatre with Czechoslovak director Antonín Hodek who inspired Haves' interest in juggling and the physical aspect of theatre.

Haves worked as a street performer in Europe where he first met David Shiner in 1981 and in 1984 he studied with Philippe Gaulier in his workshop on Lecoq movement training in Paris. Haves' work is based on the tradition of the French movement of commedia-style.

He later worked with Teatro ZinZanni in San Francisco and with Cirque du Soleil, which he joined in 2006, as a designer in the fields of comedy and clown for such Cirque shows as David Shiner's Koozå and Drawn to Life.

Haves was a creative consultant for the Tony Award winning show Fool Moon starring Bill Irwin and David Shiner.

Haves' comedy contortion act "Back Man" won $10,000 on the television series America's Funniest People.
