= Most of the Girls Like to Dance but Only Some of the Boys Like To =

Studio album by Don Dixon
- Released: 1985
- Genre: Pop
- Length: 41:06
- Label: Enigma
- Producer: Don Dixon

Don Dixon chronology
Most of the Girls Like to Dance but Only Some of the Boys Like To (1985)	Romeo at Juilliard (1987)

Most of the Girls Like to Dance but Only Some of the Boys Like To is the debut album by the American musician Don Dixon, released in Europe in 1985. The title is taken from the lyrics to "Girls L.T.D." Dixon supported the album by touring with his future wife, the musician Marti Jones. "Praying Mantis" was a minor album-oriented rock hit. The album was rereleased with additional tracks in 2000.

== Production ==
Produced by Dixon, the album was recorded over a period of five years and includes songs performed with Dixon's first band, Arrogance; other tracks were recorded at Mitch Easter's studio and at Dixon's house. Dixon's initial plan was to release singles every month and a half, but he encountered resistance from his record label. Most of the songs are about romantic relationships. "Skin Deep" is a cover of the Nick Lowe song, on which Easter played guitar. "When a Man Loves a Woman" is a version of the song made famous by Percy Sledge.

== Critical reception ==
Professional ratings
Review scores
Source	Rating
AllMusic	4.5/5 stars
Robert Christgau	A−
The Gazette	8.5/10
Los Angeles Daily News	B
MusicHound Rock: The Essential Album Guide	3.5/5 stars
The Philadelphia Inquirer	3/4 stars

The Philadelphia Inquirer opined that "this is lots of fun, particularly on the cleverly worded 'Praying Mantis' and the marvelous 'Renaissance Eyes', one of the best pop-art parodies ever." The Sun Sentinel said that Dixon "combines a husky voice with a lyrical sense of humor, wraps it in clean, sparse production and comes up with an album of winning music". The Gazette praised the "hot 'n' smoky vocals, casual production, loose playing and lyrics that are just sly enough for their own good." The Chicago Reader concluded that "the tunes are excellent pure pop for now people; the lyrics are varied and assured and familiar in an often surprising way".

The Vancouver Sun called the album "great '60s-style pop". The Toronto Star considered it a "sheer pleasure from beginning to end, a genuine collectible and the work of an artist who has not just helped re-direct the course of modern pop, but is also now one of its most promising stars." The Los Angeles Daily News labeled the album "good-natured, unpretentious average-Joe pop". Robert Christgau praised the "hooky songs with a twist".

In 2003, The Herald stated that Most of the Girls Like to Dance but Only Some of the Boys Like To "firmly [established] his consummate skills in the realm of melodic and classic pop."

== Track listing ==
No.	Title	Length
1.	"Praying Mantis"	3:58
2.	"Talk to Me"	2:52
3.	"Southside Girl"	2:55
4.	"Renaissance Eyes"	3:18
5.	"Skin Deep"	2:51
6.	"Just Rites"	4:35
7.	"Girls L.T.D."	2:54
8.	"Ice on the River"	3:15
9.	"(You're A) Big Girl Now"	3:04
10.	"Cliche"	2:00
11.	"Andy"	3:16
12.	"Wake Up"	1:56
13.	"When a Man Loves a Woman"	4:12
Total length:		41:06
