= 30 on the Rail =

Studio album by Mark Bryan
- Released: March 14, 2000
- Recorded: Reflection Studios at Charlotte, North Carolina in July 1996 and August 1997
- Genre: Rock, Gospel
- Length: 45:41
- Label: Atlantic; 83283-2
- Producer: Don Dixon

Mark Bryan chronology
30 on the Rail (2000)	End of the Front (2008)

Professional ratings
Review scores
Source	Rating
Allmusic	3/5 stars

30 on the Rail is the debut solo studio album by Hootie & the Blowfish lead guitarist Mark Bryan. Released in March 2000, every song on the album was written exclusively by Bryan; "City by a River" is the exception, as it is credited to Hootie & the Blowfish.

== Track listing ==
All songs written by Mark Bryan, unless noted otherwise

1. "If It Happens" – 2:56
2. "All That I Believe" – 3:29
3. "The Story Goes On" – 3:36
4. "City by a River" – 5:38 (Dean Felber, Darius Rucker, Jim Sonefeld, and Mark Williams)
5. "Last Light" – 4:15
6. "Together in Our Minds" – 3:47
7. "Drinkin’ You Pretty" – 2:56
8. "I’ll Fade Away" – 3:42
9. "Fall into Fall, Pt. 2" – 3:09
10. "Just Takes Time" – 4:17
11. "Halfway to Nowhere" – 2:03
12. "2 Guys Named Tim" – 3:16
13. "She Stays in Love" – 2:37

== Personnel ==
- Mark Bryan – lead vocal
- Don Dixon, Hank Futch, Danielle Howle – Additional vocals
- Mark Bryan, Don Dixon – guitar
- Don Dixon, Hank Futch, Andy Ware – bass
- Steve Hill, Fred LeBlanc – drums
- Peter Holsapple – accordion, organ, piano, recorder, wurlitzer piano, vibraphone, harmonica
- Dwayne Ellen – banjo
- Claire Bryant – cello
- Gary Greene – congas, percussion
- Greg Humphries – electric guitar
- Steve Lipton – mandolin
- Dan Cook – violin
- Mark Bryan – art direction, design
- Christina Dittmar – art direction, design
- Mark Williams – engineer
- Gerald Harbarth – illustrations
- Jim Sonefeld – photography
