= EEE (album) =

Studio album by Don Dixon
- Released: 1989
- Studio: Reflection
- Genre: Rock
- Label: Enigma
- Producer: Don Dixon

Don Dixon chronology
Chi-Town Budget Show (1989)	EEE (1989)	Romantic Depressive (1995)

EEE is an album by the American musician Don Dixon, released in 1989.

The album's first single was "Bad Reputation".

== Production ==
Recorded at Reflection Sound Studios, in Charlotte, North Carolina, the album was produced by Dixon. The Uptown Horns contributed to EEE, part of Dixon's efforts to incorporate elements of soul music in to the album's sound. Sonny Landreth played guitar on EEE; the John P. Kee New Life Community Choir sang on "I Can Hear the River".

Dixon's wife, Marti Jones, duetted with him on a cover of "Gimme Little Sign"; Dixon also covered "Dark End of the Street". "Calling Out for Love (At Crying Time)" was written by Dixon and Marshall Crenshaw. "EEE/T.O.T.T.V." is a sound collage that incorporates bits of indiscriminately taped television audio.

== Critical reception ==
Professional ratings
Review scores
Source	Rating
AllMusic	3/5 stars
Chicago Sun-Times	3/4 stars
Chicago Tribune	3/4 stars
The Encyclopedia of Popular Music	3/5 stars
MusicHound Rock: The Essential Album Guide	4/5 stars
Ottawa Citizen	2/5 stars

Trouser Press wrote that Dixon's songs "mine quirky rock-soul territory more persuasively than ever." The Washington Post thought that "his husky voice and self-assured soul delivery suggest that Dixon really doesn't have any doubts about the material or his ability to put it across." The Windsor Star called the album "a bracing release," writing that "the playing and arranging is superb."

The Los Angeles Times stated that, "as always, Dixon has the skill to construct immaculate bridges, hooks, rhyme schemes, et al., and the passion to make all that care seem effortlessly irrelevant." The Chicago Tribune determined that "Dixon continues to pen some of the most pessimistic, and powerfully alluring, love songs around." The Ottawa Citizen concluded that "only the Uptown Horns provide the needed excitement, but an album cannot stand on the flash of a good brass section alone." The Fayetteville Observer lamented that EEE "is essentially the same solo album Mr. Dixon has been making since his Triangle-based group Arrogance broke up—the stray pop gem mixed in with lots of catchy melodies that somehow don't add up to satisfying tunes."

== Track listing ==
No.	Title	Length
1.	"Oh Cheap Chatter (Why Don't I Seem Like a Man to You?)"
2.	"Silent Screen"
3.	"Love Gets Strange"
4.	"I Can Hear the River"
5.	"Dark End of the Street"
6.	"Gimme Little Sign"
7.	"One Lonely Question"
8.	"Calling Out for Love (At Crying Time)"
9.	"Bad Reputation"
10.	"EEE/T.O.T.T.V."
11.	"Roots of Truth"
12.	"Sweet Surrender"
