= Ruth Gerson =

American singer and song writer

Ruth Gerson is an American singer and song writer.

A native of New York City, Ruth Gerson grew up on the Upper West Side, the daughter of Michael and Cheryl Gerson. She was a student at the High School of Performing Arts and studied Jewish existentialism at Princeton University, graduating magna cum laude.

She began a career as a self-supporting musician, performing her own booking, hiring musicians and doing her own promotion. Her 1997 album Fools and Kings was produced by veteran producer Don Dixon. She has opened for Dave Matthews, Hootie and the Blowfish, Suzanne Vega and Roger McGuinn, and performed at the Newport Folk Festival in 1994 and the New Orleans Jazz & Heritage Festival. She also performed on Late Night with Conan O'Brien, and The Late Late Show with Craig Ferguson. In a reader's poll of Italy's largest music magazine Buscadero, she was named the second-best female vocalist of 1997, coming in behind Patti Smith. In the same year, Ruth Gerson collaborated with the Italian singer Massimo Bubola as the female vocalist in the song "Mio Capitano" by Bubola himself.

After teaching at Princeton, in 2009, following her divorce, she moved to San Francisco where she founded San Francisco Vocal Coaching. In 2010 she released her album, This Can't Be My Life, about her emotional experiences while living in New York. She is the inventor of the Singingbelt, which is an accessory designed to train singers how to use the diaphragm to perfect breath support.

== Discography ==
- "Very Live", 1995
- Fools and Kings, 1997
- "Not Around Town", 1998
- WISH, 1999
- Wake to Echo, 2003
- This Can't Be My Life, 2010
- "Deceived", May 17, 2011
