= Fool Moon (play) =

Play by David Shiner and Bill Irwin

- Original language: English
- Written by: David Shiner; Bill Irwin
- Genre: Comedy, slapstick

Premiere
- Date: 1993
- Place: New York City, New York, United States

Fool Moon is a 1993 comedy sketch and slapstick show written and performed by David Shiner and Bill Irwin. The show debuted on Broadway at the Richard Rogers Theater in 1993, and had two more Broadway runs in 1995 and 1998.

Alongside Shiner and Irwin, Fool Moon features the Red Clay Ramblers, who composed and performed music for the Broadway production of the play. The show won a Special Tony Award in 1999 and a Drama Desk Award for Unique Theatrical Experience.

Director and performer Stefan Haves worked as a consultant for Fool Moon.
