= 620 W. Surf =

Studio album by Michael McDermott
- Released: 1991
- Studio: Rumbo
- Length: 53:33
- Label: Giant
- Producer: Don Gehman; Brian Koppelman

Michael McDermott chronology
620 W. Surf (1991)	Gethsemane (1993)

620 W. Surf is the debut album by the American musician Michael McDermott, released in 1991. The album is named after McDermott's former address in Chicago.

"A Wall I Must Climb" peaked at No. 34 on Billboard's Mainstream Rock chart. McDermott supported the album with a North American tour that included shows with the BoDeans.

== Production ==
The album was produced by Don Gehman and coproduced by Brian Koppelman, who had signed McDermott. On many songs, McDermott's voice is supported only by his guitar and harmonica; McDermott wrote all of the songs. Bruce Hornsby contributed to 620 W. Surf.

== Critical reception ==
Professional ratings
Review scores
Source	Rating
AllMusic	4/5 stars
Chicago Sun-Times	2.5/4 stars
The Encyclopedia of Popular Music	3/5 stars
MusicHound Rock: The Essential Album Guide	3/5 stars
The Republican	3/5 stars

The Austin American-Statesman wrote that "A Wall I Must Climb" "suggests that his most stirring songcraft also is the simplest, while much of the rest practically begs for McDermott to lighten up a little and submit to some judicious editing." Newsday concluded that "McDermott squanders his feelings and insight on excessive verbiage." The Republican opined that, "though far too musically derivative at this point, McDermott is a very capable lyric writer."

The Philadelphia Inquirer stated that Gehman "unleashes a full-throttle rhythm section only where necessary (as on the rocking 'Sacred Ground'), which gives the album a sense of drama and development." The Washington Post concluded that "it probably will take a couple of albums before McDermott sheds some of the stylistic affectations that occasionally get in the way of his storytelling."

AllMusic noted that "the arrangements throughout the record are very effective, and are generally enhanced by McDermott's passionate vocals, though his occasional vocal excesses can become grating and interfere with the introspective tone of his songs."

== Track listing ==
All tracks are written by Michael McDermott.

No.	Title	Length
1.	"A Wall I Must Climb"	3:45
2.	"Fool's Avenue"	4:53
3.	"Shadow of the Capitol"	4:18
4.	"No. 49"	3:28
5.	"Your Silence I Will Always Admire for Its Being"	9:57
6.	"Sacred Ground"	4:10
7.	"620 W. Surf"	3:19
8.	"Murder in the First Degree"	4:05
9.	"Death in the Autumn Air"	4:28
10.	"Mr. Simmons' Arkansas Christmas Blues"	3:33
11.	"Trembling Hour"	7:17

== Personnel ==
Band

- Michael McDermott: vocals, electric and acoustic guitars, guitar solo on track 6
- Jack Holder: electric and acoustic guitars, piano and organ, accordion, hammered dulcimer
- Don Teschner: violin, dobro, backing vocals on track 2
- John K. Pierce: bass
- Denny Fongheiser: drums, percussion

Additional personnel

- Wendy Fraser, Portia Griffin, Marcy Levy: backing vocals
- Bruce Hornsby: keyboards and piano
- Kevin Savigar: Hammond organ
