= Lively (album) =

Live album by Arrogance
- Released: 1981
- Recorded: March 1981
- Genre: Rock
- Length: 45:29
- Label: Moonlight Records
- Producer: Arrogance

Arrogance chronology
Suddenly (1980)	Lively (1981)	The 5'11" Record (2002)

Professional ratings
Review scores
Source	Rating
Allmusic	3/5 stars

Lively is the fifth album by the North Carolina band Arrogance, released in 1981 (see 1981 in music). It was recorded live in March 1981 around various clubs in North Carolina. Most of these songs were unreleased at the time of its release, although a few existed as singles or B-Sides. Some also existed as unreleased demos. In its initial release, a bonus "Dog Breath" EP (referring to their pre-Arrogance band name) was included, which featured six 1960s cover songs such as "Born to Be Wild." This would be their final record until the release of 2002's The 5'11" Record.

== Track listing ==
Side One

1. "Money" (Bradford, Gordy)
2. "Backseat Rider" (Abernethy)
3. "Secrets" (Kirkland)
4. "New York" (Dixon)
5. "What's Done Is Done" (Kirkland)

Side Two

1. "Your Sister Told Me" (Dixon)
2. "Feel This Way" (Abernethy)
3. "Take A Chance" (Dixon)
4. "Angel Open" (Dixon)
5. "Eight-Ball Roll" (Abernethy)

Side Three

1. "I Want You" (Abernethy)
2. "Me No Know" (Dixon)
3. "Judy" (Kirkland)
4. "Open Window" (Kirkland)
5. "Yellow Fever" (Abernethy)
6. "Where Does The Time Go?" (Dixon)

Side Four

1. "Puff The Magic Dragon" (hidden track)

== Personnel ==
Arrogance

- Don Dixon – bass, vocals
- Robert Kirkland – guitars, vocals
- Marty Stout – keyboards
- Rod Abernethy - guitar, vocals
- Scott Davison – drums, vocals
