= Suddenly (Arrogance album) =

Studio album by Arrogance
- Released: Early 1980
- Recorded: 1979
- Studio: Reflection Sound Studios and Cherokee Studios
- Genre: Rock
- Length: 45:29
- Label: Warner Bros./Curb Records
- Producer: Phil Gernhard

Arrogance chronology
| Rumors (1976) | Suddenly (1980) | Lively (1981) |

Professional ratings
Review scores
| Source | Rating |
|---|---|
| Allmusic | 4/5 stars |

Suddenly is the fourth album by the North Carolina band Arrogance, released in 1980 (see 1980 in music).

== Track listing ==
Side One

1. "Burning Desire" (Kirkland) – 3:42
2. "I'm Not Your Taxi" (Dixon) – 2:53
3. "Bad Girl" (Kirkland) – 2:48
4. "City Woman" (Kirkland) – 3:15
5. "Bring It On Home" (Dixon) – 4:00

Side Two

1. "Suddenly" (Kirkland) – 4:56
2. "What It Takes" (Abernethy) – 3:11
3. "Get Her Out Of My Life" (Kirkland) – 3:14
4. "It Ain't Cool To Be Cruel" (Kirkland) – 2:22
5. "Cost Of Money" (Stout) – 3:20

=== Bonus tracks on 2000 CD reissue ===
1. "Secrets" (Kirkland) – 3:35
2. "Your Sister Told Me" (Dixon) – 4:07
3. "What's Done Is Done " (Kirkland) – 5:07
4. "The Little Drummer Boy" (Katherine Kennicott Davis) – 2:45

== Personnel ==
Arrogance

- Don Dixon – bass, vocals
- Robert Kirkland – guitars, vocals
- Marty Stout – keyboards
- Rod Abernethy – guitar, vocals
- Scott Davison – drums, vocals
