= This Can't Be My Life =

Studio album by Ruth Gerson
- Released: 2010
- Recorded: 2010
- Studio: The Shed
- Language: English
- Label: Wrong Records
- Producer: Nic Hard

This Can't Be My Life is a 2010 studio album by American singer-songwriter Ruth Gerson.

== Reception ==
In American Songwriter, Mike Berick gave this album three out of five stars, criticizing recurring themes and "the sense of sameness that slips into the listener’s mind during this set of 11 mainly mid-tempo soul-searching tracks", but calling out several tracks as "strong tunes".

== Track listing ==
1. "Fresh Air" – 4:41
2. "This Can't Be My Life" – 3:28
3. "Bulletproof" – 3:47
4. "Stay with Me" – 4:17
5. "Someday Soon" – 2:52
6. "Don't Go (For Em)" – 4:14
7. "Does Your Heart Weep" – 4:34
8. "Hazel" – 6:13
9. "You Lie" – 4:05
10. "Black Water" – 7:32
11. "Take It Slow" – 5:26

== Personnel ==
- Ruth Gerson – piano, vocals

Additional musicians

- David Boyle
- Eva Burmeister
- Andy Burton
- Phill Cimino
- Lance Doss
- Julia Kent
- Byron Isaacs
- Libby Johnson
- Dan Lubell
- Jack Petruzzelli
- Marc Shulman
- Adam Stern
- Daniel Wise

Technical personnel

- Rob Goodman – design
- Nic Hard – production
- Chris Gehringer – mastering
- Lisa-Marie Mazzucco – photography
- Daniel Wise – recording and mixing

== See also ==
- List of 2010 albums
