= Rumors (album) =

Studio album by Arrogance
- Released: Spring 1976
- Recorded: December 1975
- Studio: Vanguard's 23rd Street Studios, New York.
- Genre: Rock
- Length: 35:46
- Label: Vanguard
- Producer: John Anthony

Arrogance chronology
Prolepsis (1975)	Rumors (1976)	Suddenly (1980)

Professional ratings
Review scores
Source	Rating
Allmusic	4/5 stars

Rumors is the third album by the American band Arrogance, released in 1976. It was their first album on a major label, Vanguard Records. In 2000, Don Dixon re-released all of Arrogance's albums on his own label, Dixon Archival Records. The version of "Rumors" contained two bonus tracks, demos of "Open Window" and "Final Nickel" recorded at Charlotte's Reflection Sound Studios in 1975.

== Track listing ==
All tracks composed by Don Dixon; except where noted.
Side One

1. "We Live to Play" - 00:25
2. "Sunday Feeling" (Kirkland) - 3:56
3. "Final Nickel" - 3:04
4. "Two Good Legs" (Kirkland) - 3:27
5. "Dying To Know" (Kirkland) - 4:17
6. "Open Window" (Kirkland) - 3:48

Side Two

1. "Why Do You Love Me" - 2:57
2. "Lady Luck and Luxury" - 4:08
3. "Pitchin' Woo" (Kirkland) - 2:33
4. "I Doubt It" - 3:37
5. "It's Sad (But You Can't Really Hear Me at All)" - 3:34

== Bonus tracks on 2000 CD reissue ==
1. "Open Window" (Demo) - 4:21
2. "Final Nickel" (Demo) - 3:46

== Personnel ==
Arrogance

- Scott Davison – drums, percussion
- Don Dixon – bass, vocals, arranger, calliope, conductor, guitar, percussion
- Robert Kirkland – guitar, percussion, vocals
- Marty Stout – calliope, organ, piano, tack piano

with:

- Sanford Allen – concertmaster, strings, violin
- Ann Barak – violin
- Don Brooks – harmonica
- Charles Libove – violin
- Kermit Moore – cello
- Larry Packer – fiddle
- John Pintavalle – violin
- Matthew Raimondi – violin
- Eric Weissberg – banjo

Technical

- Captain Jeff Zaraya – engineer
- Ann Purtill – production supervisor
- Jules Halfant – art direction, design
