= Give Us a Break (Arrogance album) =

Studio album by Arrogance
- Released: Spring 1973
- Recorded: Late 1972
- Studio: Reflection Sound Studios, Charlotte, North Carolina
- Genre: Country Rock
- Length: 38:17 (Original LP); 44:45 (Remastered CD)
- Label: Sugarbush Records; Dixon Archival Records
- Producer: Arrogance

Arrogance chronology
Give Us a Break (1973)	Prolepsis (1975)

Professional ratings
Review scores
Source	Rating
Allmusic	3/5 stars

Give Us a Break is the first album by the North Carolina band Arrogance, released in 1973 (see 1973 in music). Only 300 copies of this album were pressed on Sugarbush Records, based in Chapel Hill.

== Track listing ==
Side One

1. "Not Unusual" (Kirkland) – 2:44
2. "Searchin'" (Kirkland) - 5:01
3. "To See Her Smile" (Kirkland) - 5:38
4. "Our Love Will Last" (Dixon) - 2:57
5. "Ma and Pa" (Kirkland) - 3:10
6. "Why Do You Love Me" (Dixon) - 3:40

Side Two

1. "A Foreshadowing" (Dixon) - 4:51
2. "I Can See It In Your Eyes" (Kirkland) - 2:25
3. "Pirates, Princes, and Kings" (Dixon) - 3:30
4. "Congratulations" (Kirkland) - 3:56

=== Bonus tracks on 2000 CD reissue ===
1. "Black Death" (Dixon)- 3:24
2. "Race With The Devil" (Greer) - 3:04

== Personnel ==
Arrogance

- Don Dixon – bass, vocals
- Robert Kirkland – guitars, vocals
- Marty Stout – keyboards
- Ogie Shaw – bongos, percussion

with:

- Rob Thorne – drums

On 2000 reissue bonus tracks (Arrogance's first recording session, 1970)

- Don Dixon – bass, vocals
- Robert Kirkland – guitars, vocals
- Mike Greer – guitars, keyboards, vocals
- Jimmy Glasgow – drums
