= Judith (album) =

Studio album by Judy Collins
- Released: March 17, 1975
- Recorded: 1975, A&R Studios, New York
- Genre: Folk
- Length: 43:39
- Label: Elektra
- Producer: Arif Mardin

Judy Collins chronology
True Stories and Other Dreams (1973)	Judith (1975)	Bread and Roses (1976)

Professional ratings
Review scores
Source	Rating
AllMusic	3/5 stars
The Encyclopedia of Popular Music	3/5 stars
The Rolling Stone Album Guide	3/5 stars

Judith is the tenth studio album by American singer and songwriter Judy Collins, released in 1975 by Elektra Records in both stereo (7E-1032) and CD-4 quadraphonic (EQ-1032) versions. Collins recorded Judith three years after her precedent album True Stories and Other Dreams, having been focused during the interim on producing Antonia: A Portrait of the Woman a documentary about Antonia Brico.

Peaking at No. 17 on the Billboard Pop Albums chart, Judith became Collins' best-selling studio album to date: certified Gold by the RIAA in 1975, for sales of over 500,000 copies, Judith would be certified Platinum in 1996, for sales of over 1,000,000 copies.

Collins received a Grammy Award nomination for Best Pop Vocal Performance, Female for her cover of Stephen Sondheim's "Send in the Clowns". Sondheim won the Grammy Award for Song of the Year that same year, based on the popularity of Collins' performance of the song on this album. The single peaked at No. 36 on Billboard's Pop singles chart in 1975, and then reentered the chart in 1977, reaching No. 19; it spent a total of 27 non-consecutive weeks on this chart.

The album also includes material by Steve Goodman, Danny O'Keefe, Wendy Waldman, Jimmy Webb, the Rolling Stones, and the 1930s standard "Brother, Can You Spare a Dime?", as well as three of Collins' own compositions- "Houses", "Song for Duke", and "Born to the Breed".

== Track listing ==
1. "The Moon Is a Harsh Mistress" (Jimmy Webb) – 2:59
2. "Angel Spread Your Wings" (Danny O'Keefe) – 3:05
3. "Houses" (Judy Collins) – 4:32
4. "The Lovin' of the Game" (Pat Garvey) – 3:03
5. "Song for Duke" (Judy Collins) – 3:33
6. "Send in the Clowns" (Stephen Sondheim) – 3:57
7. "Salt of the Earth" (Mick Jagger, Keith Richards) – 3:59
8. "Brother, Can You Spare a Dime?" (E.Y. "Yip" Harburg, Jay Gorney) – 3:13
9. "City of New Orleans" (Steve Goodman) – 4:07
10. "I'll Be Seeing You" (Sammy Fain, Irving Kahal) – 3:44
11. "Pirate Ships" (Wendy Waldman) – 2:42
12. "Born to the Breed" (Judy Collins) – 4:45

== Personnel ==
- Judy Collins – vocals, guitar, piano
- George Marge – English horn, flute, recorder
- Bill Slapin – alto flute
- Romeo Penque – flute, bass flute
- Steve Goodman – guitar, backing vocals
- Emanuel Vardi – viola
- Gene Orloff – violin
- Kenny Ascher – electric piano
- Charlie Brown, Steve Burgh, Hugh McCracken, David Spinozza – guitar
- Tony Levin – bass guitar
- Steve Gadd – drums
- Ralph MacDonald – percussion
- Kenneth Bichel – ARP synthesizer
- Eric Weissberg – bass guitar, backing vocals, guitar, steel guitar, dobro
- Paul Griffin, Pat Rebillot – organ, electric piano
- Don Brooks – harmonica
- Arthur Clarke, Seldon Powell, Tony Studd, Frank Wess, Randy Brecker, Garnett Brown – horns
- Denver Collins, Cissy Houston, Sylvia Shemwell, Eunice Peterson – background vocals
- Corky Hale – harmonica, harp
- Dom Cortes – accordion
- George Ricci – cello

== Production notes ==
- Arif Mardin – producer
- Jonathan Tunick – arranger, conductor ("Houses", "Send in the Clowns" and "I'll Be Seeing You")
- Arif Mardin – arranger, conductor (remaining songs)
- Phil Ramone – recording engineer
- Glenn Berger – assistant recording engineer
- Glen Christensen – art direction
- David Larkham, Ron Wong– design
- Francesco Scavullo – photography

== Charts ==
=== Weekly charts ===
Weekly chart performance for Judith
Chart (1975)	Peak position
Australian Albums (Kent Music Report)	19
Canada Top Albums (RPM)	19
UK Albums (OCC)	7
US Top LP's & Tape (Billboard)	17
US Top 100 Albums (Cash Box)	22
US The Album Chart (Record World)	17

=== Year-end charts ===
Year-end chart performance for Judith
Chart (1975)	Position
Canada Top Albums (RPM)	73
US Top LP's & Tape (Billboard)	17
US Top 100 Albums (Cash Box)	94

== Certifications and sales ==
Certifications for Judith
Region	Certification	Certified units/sales
United States (RIAA)	Platinum	1,000,000^{^}
^{^} Shipments figures based on certification alone.
