= My Long-Haired Life =

Studio album by Marti Jones
- Released: 1996
- Label: Sugar Hill
- Producer: Don Dixon

Marti Jones chronology
Live at Spirit Square (1996)	My Long-Haired Life (1996)	My Tidy Doily Dream (2002)

My Long-Haired Life is an album by the American musician Marti Jones, released in 1996. It was released the same year as a live album, Live at Spirit Square, which was recorded in 1990. The albums marked a return from a six-year recording hiatus. My Long-Haired Life's title alludes to Jones's career before motherhood. The album's first single was "It's Not What I Want".

== Production ==
The album was produced by Don Dixon. Eight of the album's 11 songs are covers; the other three were cowritten by Jones and Dixon. The pair duetted on the cover of Joe Tex's "You Got What It Takes"; "Sleep of the Just" is a cover of the Elvis Costello song. Jones played a 1940 000-18 Martin guitar on the album.

== Critical reception ==
Professional ratings
Review scores
Source	Rating
AllMusic	3/5 stars
The Austin Chronicle	2.5/5 stars
Chicago Tribune	2.5/4 stars
Daily Herald	3/4 stars
MusicHound Rock: The Essential Album Guide	2.5/5 stars
The Republican	3/5 stars
The San Diego Union-Tribune	3/4 stars

No Depression called the album "too adult for alternative rock, too pure pop for adult alternative, too smart for Top 40... Banished to eclectic public radio shows forever." The Austin Chronicle wrote that "the real surprise ... is that Jones shines brightest when pouring over her own songs penned with longtime cohort Don Dixon." The St. Louis Post-Dispatch concluded that My Long-Haired Life "is a lean, beautiful record and one of the best of 1996."

The Chicago Tribune stated: "Embracing folk, pop and blue-eyed soul, Jones displays a nimble vocal style and a broad range of influences." The San Diego Union-Tribune praised the "Marti-in-Memphis take" on Otis Redding's "Champagne and Wine". The Charleston Daily Mail thought that "the tunes showcase Jones' smooth, lilting alto and Dixon's ear-pleasing sense of 'what goes where'."

AllMusic called the album "a wonderfully eclectic pool of material."

== Track listing ==
No.	Title	Length
1.	"I Love the Sound of Breaking Glass"
2.	"It's Not What I Want"
3.	"Life's a Game"
4.	"Black Coffee in Bed"
5.	"Champagne and Wine"
6.	"Sleep of the Just"
7.	"Put Me on Top"
8.	"You Got What It Takes"
9.	"Feather on a Stone"
10.	"Silent Partner"
11.	"Songs to Aging Children Come"
