= Treva Spontaine and The Graphic =

Indie band

Treva Spontaine and The Graphic, later The Graphic was a Greensboro, North Carolina indie band popular in colleges of the southeast USA during the 1980s. In 1984 Don Dixon produced the 6-track album People In Glass for Treva Spontaine and The Graphic. People In Glass was reissued in 1985 in Denmark as Way of the World.

== Discography ==
=== People In Glass ===
1. "Way of the World" – 3:58 (Brad Newell)
2. "Magical Equation" – 3:30 (Newell)
3. "It's My Dance" – 3:55 (Newell)
4. "It's Lonely Out Here" – 4:15 (Newell)
5. "Entrer Dans L'Amour" – 4:35 (Newell)
6. "I Dream Alone" – 2:22 (Tréva Spontaine)

Credits:

- Drums: Jim Hoyle
- Bass/Vocals: Dwight Mabe
- Guitars/Keyboards/Vocals: Brad Newell
- Vocals/Guitars: Treva Spontaine
- Produced and Recorded by Don Dixon at Reflection Sound Studios, Charlotte, NC
- Additional percussion: Gary Collins
- Sax: Dixonics
- Mastered by Greg Calbi at Sterling Sound, NYC
- Blended by Don Dixon
- Band photo: Laura Levine
- Cover design: Bob Murray
- Thanks to: Wayne Jerrigan, Steve Haigler, Anne Echerd, Susan Needham, R. Tim Embry

The track "Magical Equation" earned air play on regional campus radio. The track "Entrer Dans L'Amour" is unusual for a North Carolina band since it is in French. Treva Spontaine previously played in two Chapel Hill Bands, Treva and Graham Forge.
