= Prolepsis (album) =

Studio album by Arrogance
- Released: April 4, 1975
- Recorded: May–June 1974
- Studio: Reflection Sound Studios, Charlotte, North Carolina
- Genre: Country Rock
- Length: 45:29
- Label: Sugarbush Records
- Producer: Arrogance

Arrogance chronology
| Give Us a Break (1973) | Prolepsis (1975) | Rumors (1976) |

Professional ratings
Review scores
| Source | Rating |
|---|---|
| Allmusic | 3/5 stars |

Prolepsis is the second album by the North Carolina band Arrogance, released in 1975 (see 1975 in music).

== Track listing ==
Side One

1. "Six Wings" (Kirkland) – 3:20
2. "Bad Girl" (Dixon) – 2:42
3. "Barely Alive" (Kirkland) – 2:23
4. "Sun Sweet" (Dixon) - 8:50
5. "North End of Town" (Kirkland) – 3:17

Side Two

1. "We Live To Play" (Dixon) - :26
2. "Slaughtered Elves" (Kirkland) - 2:29
3. "Can't I Buy A Song" (Dixon) - 2:39
4. "Sunday Feeling" (Kirkland) - 4:14
5. "People Aren't Free" (Dixon) - 4:09
6. "Cost Of Money" (Stout) - 4:18
7. "My Final Song" (Dixon) - 6:24

== Personnel ==
Arrogance

- Don Dixon – bass, vocals
- Robert Kirkland – guitars, vocals
- Marty Stout – keyboards
- Steve Herbert – drums, vocals

with:

- Brian Cumming – French horn on "Sun Sweet"
- Bob Ennis - violin on "North End of Town"

Technical

- Wayne Jernigan - recording
- Randy Crittenden - art direction
- Susan Dixon, John Locher, Richard Carter - photography
