= Bread and Roses (album) =

Studio album by Judy Collins
- Released: August 1976
- Recorded: 1976
- Genre: Folk
- Label: Elektra
- Producer: Arif Mardin

Judy Collins chronology
Judith (1975)	Bread and Roses (1976)	So Early in the Spring (1977)

Professional ratings
Review scores
Source	Rating
AllMusic	2.5/5 stars
The Encyclopedia of Popular Music	3/5 stars
The Rolling Stone Album Guide	2.5/5 stars

Bread and Roses is the eleventh studio album by American singer and songwriter Judy Collins, released by Elektra Records in 1976. The album peaked at No. 25 on the Billboard Pop Albums charts.

Merging the singer's political convictions with the commercial success of the previous year's Judith, political statements like the title song, originally a poem by James Oppenheim commonly associated with a 1912 garment workers strike in Lawrence, Massachusetts, were balanced with such pop compositions as Elton John's "Come Down in Time".

Released as the single from the album was "Special Delivery" by Billy Mernit. Luther Vandross sang background on this album, one of his earliest commercially recorded vocal performances.

== Track listing ==
1. "Bread and Roses" (Mimi Fariña, James Oppenheim) – 3:05
2. "Everything Must Change" (Benard Ighner) – 4:25
3. "Special Delivery" (Billy Mernit) – 3:55
4. "Out of Control" (Judy Collins) – 3:00
5. "Plegaria a un Labrador (Prayer to a Laborer)" (Víctor Jara) – 4:04
6. "Come Down in Time" (Elton John, Bernie Taupin) – 3:23
7. "Spanish Is the Loving Tongue" (Charles Badger Clark, Billy Simon) – 4:32
8. "I Didn't Know About You" (Duke Ellington, Bob Russell) – 3:29
9. "Take This Longing" (Leonard Cohen) – 5:25
10. "Love Hurts" (Andrew Gold) – 3:17
11. "Marjorie" (Judy Collins) – 0:43
12. "King David" (Walter De La Mare, Herbert Howells) – 4:27

== Personnel ==
- Judy Collins – Guitar, keyboards, vocals
- Gloria Agostini – Harp
- Rubens Bassini – Percussion
- Sy Berger – Trombone
- Jay Berliner, Hugh McCracken, Mark Doyle – Guitar
- Kenneth Bichel – Synthesizer
- Don Brooks, Corky Hale – Harmonica
- Robin Clark – Vocals
- Dom Cortese – Accordion
- Richard Davis, Tony Levin – Bass guitar
- Erin Dickins – Vocals
- Mark Doyle – Guitar
- Steve Gadd – Drums
- Mickey Gravine, Urbie Green – Trombone
- Hank Jones – Piano
- Gail Kantor – Vocals
- George Marge – Horn
- Charles McCracken – Cello
- Merle Miller – Vocals
- Andy Pratt – Piano
- David Sanborn – Saxophone
- Les Scott – Wind
- Alan Shulman – Steel guitar
- Billy Slapin – Flute
- G. Diane Sumler – Vocals
- Luther Vandross – Vocals

Note: In a detailed writeup of the "King David" session, Modern Recording magazine lists instrumentation and shows the unnamed personnel: eight cellos, two basses, two harps, flute—conducted by arranger Jonathan Tunick.

Technical

- Godfrey Diamond – Engineer
- Phil Ramone – Recording supervisor
- Glen Christensen – Art direction
- Mary Ellen Mark – Photography

== Charts ==
Chart performance for Bread and Roses
Chart (1976)	Peak position
Australian Albums (Kent Music Report)	96
US Top LPs & Tape (Billboard)	25
US Top 100 Albums (Cash Box)	38
US The Album Chart (Record World)	48
