= David Shiner (clown) =

American clown (born 1953)

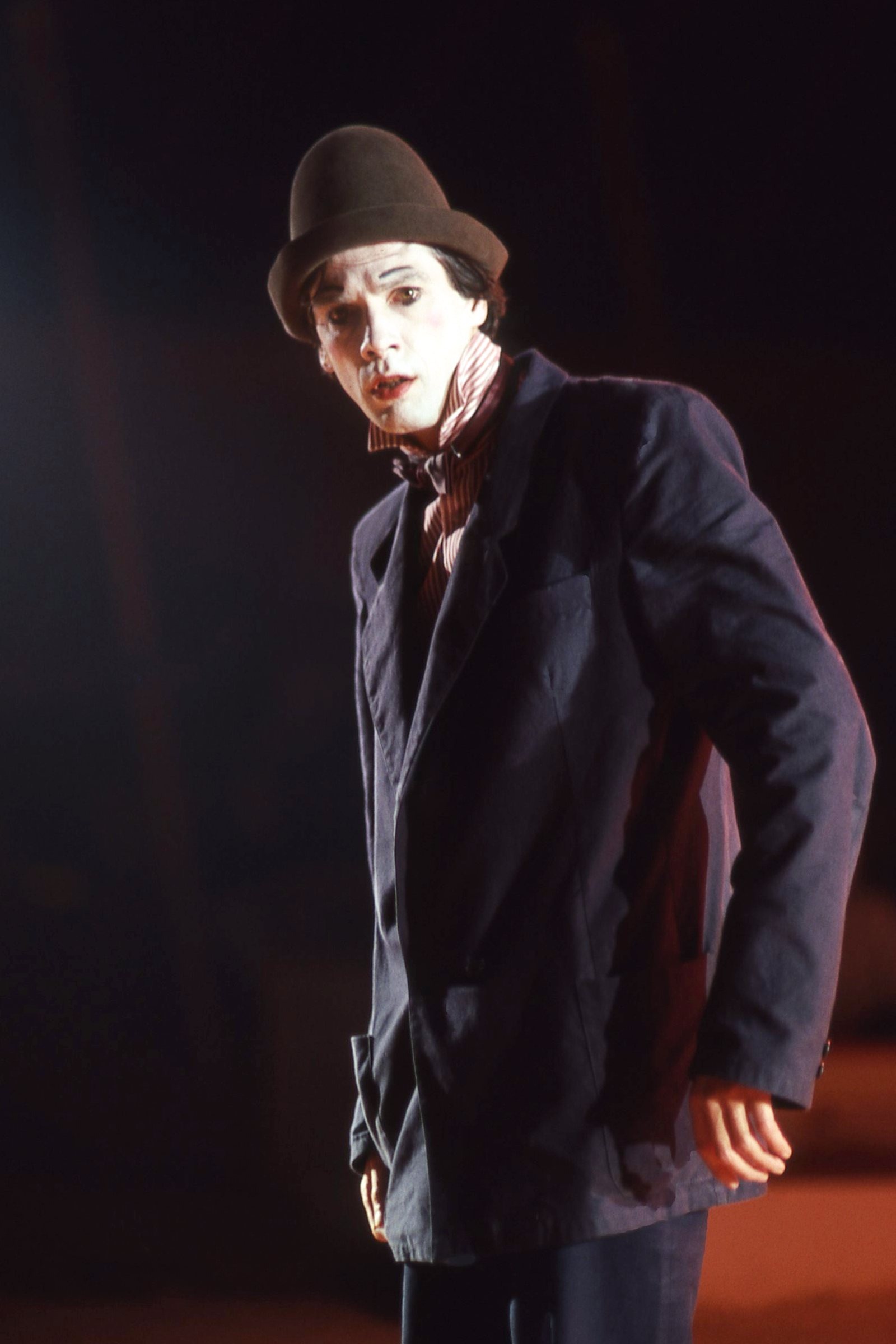
- David Shiner (Circus Roncalli 1984)
- Born: September 13, 1953 (age 72); Boston, Massachusetts, U.S.
- Occupations: Actor, clown, playwright, theater director

David Shiner (born September 13, 1953) is an American actor, clown, physical comedian, playwright and theater director.

== Background and career ==
David Shiner is an American clown and physical comedian who has worked in various fields of entertainment, including circus, theater, film, and television. He is best known for his work with Cirque du Soleil and with Bill Irwin.

Shiner was born in Boston, Massachusetts. Shiner began his career as a street mime, first in Colorado, and later moved to Paris, where he worked with the French clown, Marcel Marceau. Not long after, the German Circus Roncalli and the Swiss National Circus (Circus Knie) invited Shiner to perform in the Big Top, in between he toured performing a dual act with René Bazinet.

In 1990, he starred in Cirque du Soleil's production Nouvelle Expérience, as a clown and co-creator.

In 1993, Shiner and Bill Irwin then created the two-man, wordless Broadway show Fool Moon, featuring music by the Red Clay Ramblers. Fool Moon ran from 1993–99, including three separate runs at Broadway. The show won a special Tony for "Live Theatrical Presentation" in 1999, a Drama Desk Award for Unique Theatrical Experience, and an Outer Critics Circle "Special Achievement" Award plus Shiner won a Tony Award for his performance in Fool Moon in 1993.

In 1995, he also starred in Man of the House. The production was filmed for HBO and Shiner's popularity rendered him film roles in Lorenzo's Oil and in Sam Shepard's Silent Tongue.

In 2000, Shiner originated the lead role of The Cat in the Hat in the Broadway stage musical Seussical.

Later he toured Europe and Seattle with his shows David Shiner in the Round and Drop Everything. He made additional appearances on The Tonight Show, and is a guest director at the Wintergarden Theatre in Berlin and the Apollo Theatre in Düsseldorf.

In addition to his work as a performer, Shiner wrote and directed Cirque du Soleil's touring production Koozå, in 2007. Using such performers as Gordon White, Jason Berrent, Stephan Laundry, Michael Halvarson, Joshua Ryan Zehner and Christian Fitzherris for the original cast. Koozå is the most successful touring show of Cirque du Soleil to this day.

Shiner developed the Shiner Method to mentor actors and clowns in his masterclass-ensemble-program.

In 2009, Shiner wrote and directed the Cirque du Soleil show Banana Shpeel.

In 2013, Shiner co-wrote and starred in the Off-Broadway revue show Old Hats with his Fool Moon co-star Bill Irwin. Musician Nellie McKay also performed in the 2013 show. In 2016, Old Hats was revived in New York City with Shiner and Irwin returning and a new third performer, musician Shaina Taub, performing original songs with a band in between sketches. Old Hats won the 2013 Drama Desk Award for Outstanding Revue.

He also was featured in the American Theatre Wing's Working in the Theatre series that was centered on clowning.
