= PMT Dance Studio =

New York City dance school and company

- Formation: 2001
- Founder: Pavan Thimmaiah
- Type: Dance school, Repertory company, Non-profit showcase company
- Purpose: Hip Hop, Funk, Jazz dance
- Location: New York City, U.S.
- Key people: Pavan Thimmaiah (Founder & Director); Alan Watson (Assistant Director)

PMT Dance Studio is a New York City based company founded by dancer and choreographer Pavan Thimmaiah in 2001. It currently comprises a dance school, repertory company and the PMT Seasonal Showcase Company.

== History ==
Founded by Pavan M. Thimmaiah, PMT Dance Company is a New York City based company that has performed both locally and internationally.

They have performed at various venues, including the International Bollywood Movie Awards (2003) at the Trump Taj Mahal, the International Dance Festival – “Men at Work” (2006) in NYC, and at the Canadian National Exhibition (2006) in Toronto, Canada and as half-time acts at Madison Square Garden (2014-2016). PMT Dance Company was featured on the Today Show on 2 occasions in 2015 – the latter resulting in them achieving the Guinness World Record for the World's Largest Street Dance (in conjunction with PMT Dance Studio). In 2008, PMT Dance Company put on their first full-length stage production entitled “Struck”. The production run was well received and was eventually featured on the Sundance Channel's “Young Revolutionaries” TV Special (2009).

== Performances and Repertory ==
PMT Dance Studio consists of two sub-companies: PMT Seasonal Showcase Company and PMT Dance Company. The PMT Seasonal Showcase Company – is a non-profit company that is responsible for the production of various showcases, including showcases by PMT's repertory company. It produces dozens of showcases annually, usually in the Spring and Fall seasons. These productions showcase various dance companies, many of which are up and coming. The showcase company also provides rehearsal space and other means of assistance to its presenters. 1-2 companies a year are selected to be an artist in residence, which involves the production of showcases highlighting the work of the artist in residence. The PMT Seasonal Showcase company has been in existence since the Fall of 2001, assisting with the development of hundreds of dance companies and choreographers since that time.

PMT Dance Company is the repertory company for the studio. It is under the direction of Pavan Thimmaiah and its assistant director is Alan Watson. PMT Dance Company incorporates original music and a storyline into elements of Hip Hop, Funk, and Jazz dance. Its credits include the International Bollywood Movie Awards and Sensing Peace Documentary Gala and the International Dance Festival where Pavan Thimmaiah was a featured choreographer in a night honoring male choreographers entitled "Men at Work." In addition, PMT Dance Company was chosen to perform in Toronto at the Canadian National Exhibition in July 2006. In 2008, PMT Dance Company completed a run of their first feature-length production called "Struck..." "Struck..." was a collaborative effort which featured a culmination of work by Pavan Thimmaiah as well as the choreography of Jed Forman, Yesid Lopez and Alan Watson. The show was eventually featured on the Sundance Channel. "Struck..." is scheduled for a 2011 production.
