= Dolphin Music =

Online retailer

Dolphin Music.
- Type: Private
- Industry: Musical instruments
- Founded: 1999
- Headquarters: Venture Point West, 70-72 Evans Rd, Liverpool, L24 9PB
- Products: Musical instruments, recording equipment and accessories
- Owner: S&T Audio
- Number of employees: 25
- Website: dolphinmusic.co.uk

Dolphin Music was an online retailer selling musical instruments and recording equipment online. It was set up in Liverpool, England in 1999.

== History ==
Robert Williams (11 September 1979 — 2 March 2009) and Jason Tavaria, while still at Liverpool University, used their credit cards & student loans to set up a company that would sell musical equipment by mail order and over the internet.

In 2009 Robert Williams died whilst snowboarding in Switzerland. In 2011 Dolphin Music was purchased by S&T Audio Ltd, who also own Play Music Today (PMT) retail stores and the PMTonline webstore.

In June 2025, S&T Audio Ltd entered administration, and its 11 UK stores and online operations were shut down. Following the administration, Gear4music acquired assets from the administrators, including stock, websites, trademarks, and commercial data, but did not take on PMT’s ongoing trading business or liabilities, and has no plans to resume trading under the PMT name.
