= Play Music Today =

UK based music company

S & T Audio Limited
- Trade name: Play Music Today
- Type: Limited
- Industry: Musical Instrument retail
- Founded: 1991
- Founders: Simon Gilson; Terry Hope
- Defunct: 11 June 2025
- Headquarters: Speke, Liverpool, United Kingdom
- Products: Musical instruments, PA
- Website: gear4music.com/information/PMT

S & T Audio Limited, trading as Play Music Today (often shortened to PMT Online, PMT, or PMT Music; formerly known as Professional Music Technology), was a musical instrument retailer with stores across England and Wales. The warehouse, logistics, sales marketing and e-commerce teams were based in Speke, Liverpool. The original store was located in Southend-on-Sea, UK. PMT's Birmingham store was the biggest music shop in the UK.

PMT’s online store offered a range of musical instruments including guitars, drums, keyboards and PA systems along with a blog that provided information on newly released products, how-to guides and ‘Best of’ instrument lists.

Play Music Today also had a YouTube channel (called PMTVUK) which reviewed new musical instruments and offered advice to musicians of all levels. The company entered administration in June 2025.

== History ==
The first PMT store was opened on 17 August 1991 in Southend-on-Sea, UK by owners Simon Gilson and Terry Hope under the holding company of S&T Audio. The company expanded to 15 locations across the UK, selling musical instruments such as guitars, bass, drums/percussion, keyboards, 'vocal solutions', PA and studio/recording equipment, DJ/producer equipment and musical instrument accessories, both in-store and online via their own website.

In May 2011, PMT acquired Liverpool-based Dolphin Music, continuing to trade under both names before closing Dolphin and merging the site with PMT Online in 2017.

In 2013, members of local bands Radiohead and Supergrass helped to prevent PMT's Oxford location from being converted into a cafe and restaurant as part of a hotel development.

In March 2016, PMT acquired Nevada Music in Portsmouth, re-branding the existing Nevada Music store to PMT.

In 2022, PMT was rebranded from Professional Music Technology to Play Music Today, with an emphasis on community, inclusivity, and making music available to all regardless of skill. The flagship Southend store closed that year.

On 11 June 2025, the company entered administration and ceased trading. Gear4music subsequently bought from the administrators certain stock, together with certain intangible assets including websites and trademarks, but none of the trading business.

== YouTube ==
The Play Music Today YouTube channel, was started to provide viewers with information on current product reviews as well as ‘How To’ guides and ‘Best Of’ lists. PMTVUK now has over 354,000 subscribers (March 2023).
