= Mike Cross (musician) =

American singer-songwriter and musician

- Born: October 25, 1946 (age 78)
- Genres: Folk
- Occupation(s): Musician, singer-songwriter
- Instrument(s): Vocals, guitar, fiddle, foot
- Years active: 1970s–present
- Labels: Sugar Hill
- Website: mikecross.com

Mike Cross (born October 25, 1946, in Maryville, Tennessee) is an American singer-songwriter and musician. His music blends rock, country, pop and folk. Signed to prominent label Sugar Hill (notable for releases by Doc Watson, Jerry Douglas, Sam Bush, Dolly Parton and numerous others), Cross enjoys a strong fan following at live performances across the nation. Best known for his humorous songs such as "The Scotsman," his catalog features a wide variety of musical genres and moods.

== Discography ==
Year	Title	Label	Number	Notes
1976	Child Prodigy	GHE	GR1001	
1977	Born in the Country	GHE	GR1002	TCS TGS1003
1979	Bounty Hunter	GHE	GR1003	Moonlight MLR 1002
1980	Rock 'n Rye	GHE	GR1004	produced by Steve Burgh
1981	Live & Kickin	Sugar Hill	SH1005	live
1983	Carolina Sky	Sugar Hill	SH1006	
1985	Solo at Midnight	Sugar Hill	SH1007	
1989	Prodigal Son	Sugar Hill	SH1008	
1990	Irregular Guy	Sugar Hill	SH1009	
1994	Creme de la Cross – Best of the Funny Stuff	Sugar Hill	SH1010	compilation
1994	High Powered, Low Flying	Sugar Hill	SH1011	
1998	Michael's Magic Music Box	MiMa-MuBo	101	children's music
	At Large in the World	MiMa-MuBo	102	
2012	Crossin' Carolina	MiMa-MuBo	105	
