= Michael McDermott (musician) =

American singer-songwriter

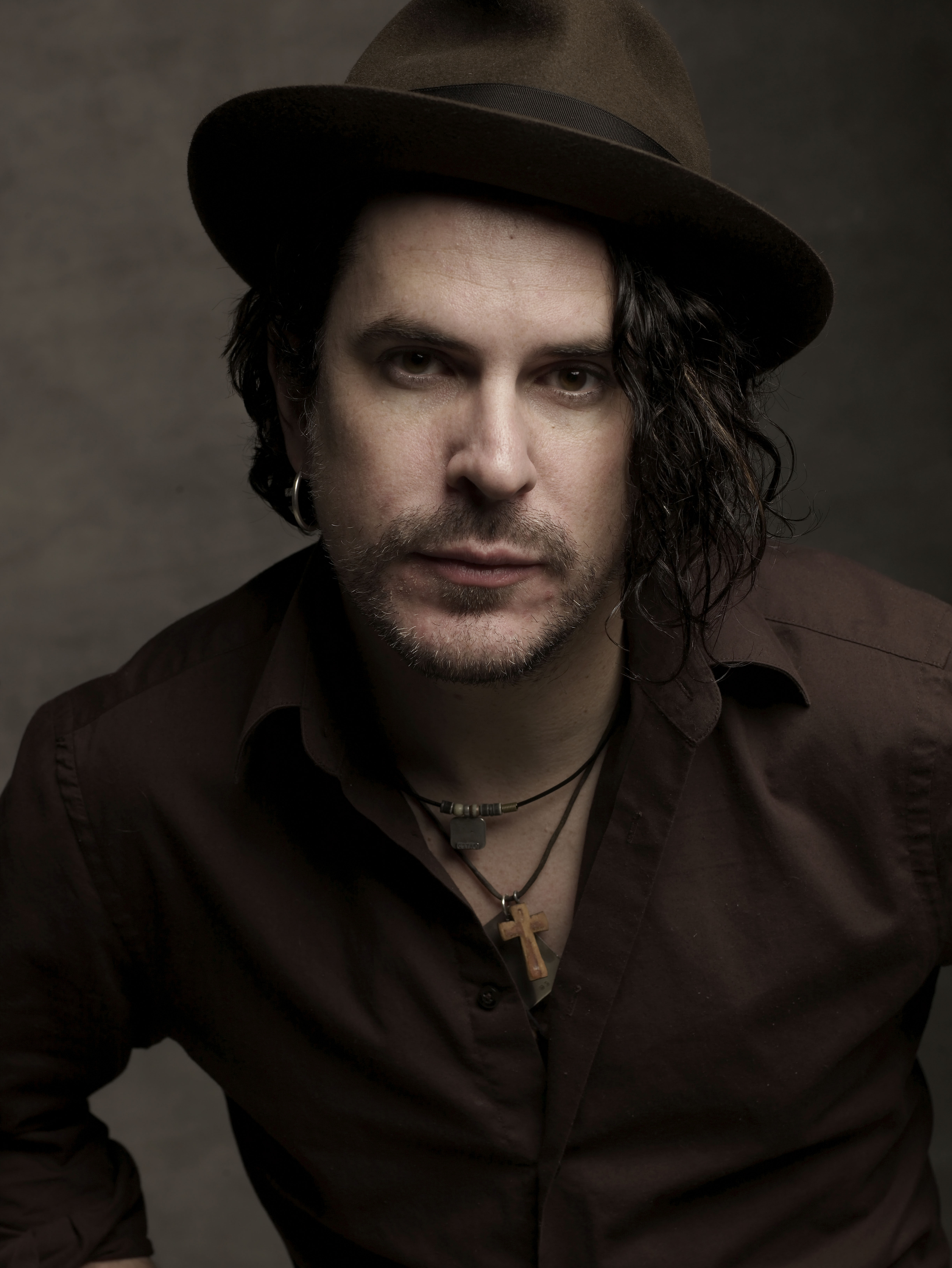

Background information
- Born: August 24, 1968 (age 58)
- Origin: Chicago, Illinois, United States
- Genre: Americana
- Instruments: Vocals, guitar, piano
- Years active: 1990–present
- Labels: EMI Records (USA); SBK Records; E1 Music; One Little Indian Records; Pauper Sky Records
- Website: Michael-mcdermott.com

Michael McDermott (born August 24, 1968) is an American singer-songwriter. His music is enjoyed by Stephen King, who wrote liner notes for one of McDermott's albums.

== Career ==
=== 1991: Record deal & 620 W. Surf ===
McDermott started performing in Chicago coffeehouses in the early 1990s, incorporating elements of Irish music into an American folk rock sound. He was signed by Brian Koppelman to Giant Records; his 1991 single A Wall I Must Climb from the album 620 W. Surf reached No. 34 on the Billboard Mainstream Rock tracks chart.

McDermott released several albums in the 1990s and toured extensively behind them. His lyrics were quoted in the Stephen King books Insomnia, and in the book Rose Madder, one of the characters constantly wears a shirt of his that reads "I'm in love with a girl called Rain".

=== 1996: Michael McDermott ===
In January 1996, McDermott released his 3rd major label album: the self-titled Michael McDermott. The album's liner notes were written by super-fan Stephen King, who opined about the prior album: "My first listen to Gethsemane is one of the great events of my life as a rock music fan. It wasn't so much the record itself, good as it was, as the man on the record. Not since I first heard Bruce Springsteen singing 'Rosalita' had I heard someone who excited me so much as a listener, who turned my dials so high, who just made me feel so fucking happy to have ears."

=== 2013: The Westies ===
In 2013, McDermott formed The Westies with Heather Horton, Ian Fitchuk, Joe Pisapia and Lex Price. On May 13, 2014, the band released an album of new songs in Italy on Appaloosa Records. The album's US release was in the spring of 2015 on Pauper Sky Records.

On January 29, 2016, The Westies released another album entitled Six On The Out. This album was released on the same record labels as their debut.

=== 2016: Willow Springs ===
In 2016, McDermott released Willow Springs, named for the small town where he now resides with his wife and daughter. Recorded at his home in the country and fan-funded, Willow Springs was produced by McDermott with longtime producer and collaborator Lex Price mixing the record. Performers on the record include Price, guitarist Will Kimbrough, keyboardist John Deaderick and McDermott's wife, Heather Horton on backing vocals. The record went to No. 1 on the Euro Americana album chart.

=== 2018: Orland Park District 230 Legacy Hall of Fame ===
In April 2018, McDermott released Out From Under and followed it with extensive domestic and international touring. In the spring of 2018, he was inducted into his school's hall of fame. On February 8, 2019, McDermott released Orphans. The album includes tracks recorded during the sessions for both Willow Springs and Out From Under, as well as some earlier recordings. The release of Orphans was followed by another tour.

=== 2022: St. Paul's Boulevard, memoir and Tenco Award for Songwriting ===
On May 20, 2022, McDermott released St. Paul's Boulevard. It received critical acclaim from journalists such as John Apice, who wrote in Americana Highways: "McDermott isn't a song & dance man. He's a serious artist. Not necessarily a folk singer either. He's about as important, pertinent & reinforcing as James Taylor, Cat Stevens (Yusef Islam), Peter Himmelman, & John Hiatt. There's a Tin Pan Alley quality, with intense songwriter delicacy that isn't mainstream pop music. 'Pack the Car', though — is an ass-kicking beauty of a rocker."

On September 2, 2022, McDermott released his memoir, Scars From Another Life. Written over a few years prior, it covers the arc of his career to date as well as personal struggles and triumphs. According to the Chicago Sun-Times, "In his new memoir, Scars From Another Life, McDermott writes about his near-fatal life journey through alcohol and cocaine addiction, self-destruction, guns, financial ruin and the music that became his salvation."

In September 2022, McDermott was announced as a winner of the Tenco Award for Songwriting. On the subject, the New Jersey Stage wrote, "McDermott is now part of a lofty winner's circle as the Tenco Award has previously gone to luminaries in the singer-songwriter pantheon such as Leonard Cohen, Joni Mitchell, Tom Waits, Sting, Jackson Browne, Elvis Costello, Randy Newman, and David Crosby. A few international past winners include Caetano Veloso, Jacques Brel, Joan Manuel Serrat, and Milton Nascimento."

McDermott has performed "God Bless America" and "The Star Spangled Banner" at arenas and stadiums across the United States. Teams that have invited him to sing include: the Chicago Cubs, the Chicago White Sox, the Illinois Fighting Illini Basketball team, the Green Bay Packers, the Chicago Bears, the Los Angeles Lakers, the Los Angeles Kings, and NASCAR.

== Personal life ==
In May 2009, McDermott married Heather Lynne Horton in Italy. They have one child.

McDermott has previously suffered from alcohol and substance abuse. He has been clean and sober since January 2014.

== Discography ==
- 620 W. Surf (Giant Records/Reprise Records, 1991) – recorded in Los Angeles; it was produced by Don Gehman and Brian Koppelman. Bruce Hornsby was a guest player.
- Seattle Record (unreleased) – produced by Rich Parashar in Seattle for Giant Records. The record was sold to EMI, but never released. Dave Navarro was a guest guitar player. As of January 2026, the album is available on streaming services.
- Gethsemane (SBK Records, 1993) – recorded in Charlotte NC, produced by Don Dixon
- Michael McDermott (EMI Records, 1996) – recorded in Memphis, produced by Joe Hardy. Author Stephen King wrote liner notes for the album and was a guest guitar player.
- Bourbon Blue (Wanted Man Records, 1999) – recorded in Chicago, produced by Michael McDermott
- Last Chance Lounge (Koch Records, 2000) – recorded in Memphis, produced by Joe Hardy
- Ashes (Pauper Sky Records, 2004) – recorded in Houston & Los Angeles, produced by Joe Hardy and Dan Petty
- Beneath the Ashes (Pauper Sky Records, 2004)- outtakes from Ashes sessions, produced by Joe Hardy and Dan Petty
- Noise From Words (One Little Indian, 2007) – recorded in Chicago and Los Angeles, produced by Michael McDermott and Jim Wirt
- Hey La Hey (Pauper Sky Records, 2009) – recorded in Nashville, produced by Lex Price
- Hit Me Back (Pauper Sky Records/Rock Ridge Music, 2012) – recorded in Chicago, produced by CJ Eiriksson
- Willow Springs (Pauper Sky Records, 2016) – recorded in Chicago, produced by Michael McDermott and Lex Price
- Out From Under (Pauper Sky Records, 2018) – recorded in Chicago and Nashville, produced by Michael McDermott and Lex Price
- Orphans (Pauper Sky Records, 2019)
- What In The World... (Pauper Sky Records, 2020)
- Stories, Lies, & Legends (Pauper Sky Records, 2020) - 66 song collection of home demo's and outtakes spanning 30 year career
- House Arrest (Pauper Sky Records, 2021) - live album of songs recorded on StageIt! during the COVID-19 pandemic
- St. Paul's Boulevard (Pauper Sky Records, 2022)
- Lighthouse on The Shore/East Jesus (Pauper Sky Records, 2024)
- Lost City Seattle (Pauper Sky Records, 2026)
- Flowers From the Graveyard (Pauper Sky Records, 2026)

=== The Westies (Band) Releases ===
- West Side Stories (Appaloosa/Pauper Sky Records, 2015) – recorded in Nashville at The Casino, produced by Lex Price
- Six on the Out (Appaloosa/Pauper Sky Records, 2016) – recorded in Nashville at The Casino, produced by Lex Price

=== Independent Releases ===
- In a Godless Night (2-Disc) (Wanted Man Music, 1998)
- ...and in the meantime (Wanted Man Music, 2001)
- My Soul's Unfettered (Wanted Man Music, 2002)
- Best of Michael McDermott (Wanted Man Music, 2004)
- Someone Else's Clothes (Pauper Sky Records, 2015)
- XXV (Pauper Sky Records, 2016)
