= Arrogance (band) =

American rock band

- Origin: Chapel Hill, North Carolina, US
- Genres: Rock
- Years active: 1970s – present
- Labels: Vanguard; Warner/Curb; Moonlight; GAFF
- Members: Rod Abernethy; Don Dixon; Scott Davison; Robert Kirkland; Marty Stout
- Past members: Mike Greer; Jim Glasgow; Ogie Shaw

Arrogance is a rock band from Chapel Hill, North Carolina. In the 1970s and early 1980s, they were considered one of the most popular local bands in the state. All Music Guide stated that Arrogance was “one of the architects of the alternative trend of the 1980s”.

Arrogance made a run of appearances at Raleigh's Village Subway, and were the first group to play some chords at the Pier back in 1973. The group has released six full length albums in its history and an early non-LP single.

In 1983, the group entered a dormant period, and the members did not perform together again until 2000, when the band reunited for a few select concerts and gigs in the Triangle area in celebration of Arrogance's 30th anniversary. The most notable was the "Reunion" concert at the North Carolina Museum of Art Amphitheatre in Raleigh in 2000. After large turnouts at the band's 2000 performances, Arrogance began performing again in local clubs, bars, and at special events, averaging about one show a year. The band's current lineup consists of Rod Abernethy, Don Dixon, Scott Davison, Robert Kirkland, and Marty Stout.

== History ==
Arrogance began in a dorm room at the University of North Carolina at Chapel Hill when Don Dixon and Robert Kirkland began singing together in 1969. Robert's roommate, Mike Greer, and a drummer from East Carolina University, Jimmy Glasgow, helped form the band. The first sets included a mix of covers from The Beatles, Black Sabbath, Muddy Waters, Cream and Mountain. They dubbed the group Arrogance, a concept of Dixon's referring to their reputation of upstaging other bands. A few months later at Crescent City Studios in Greensboro, the band made its first recording—a 45-rpm single of two original tunes, “Black Death” and “An Estimation”, that was released in the summer.

As the artistic partnership between Dixon and Kirkland strengthened, the band personnel changed, with Mike and Jimmy being replaced by pianist Marty Stout and percussionist Ogie Shaw. Arrogance's debut album, the self-released, self-produced LP Give Us a Break came out in 1973. A more acoustic folk style had, by then, replaced the early hard-rock, but the trademark vocals, harmonies and lyrics were very much in evidence. The sound became more upbeat when percussionist Ogie Shaw was replaced by drummer Steve Herbert and the result was Arrogance's second album, Prolepsis in 1975. Late in 1974, before the release of Prolepsis, Steve Herbert left the band and was replaced by Scott Davison.

Rumors was released in 1976 but unfortunately Vanguard, then a New York City independent label, was ill-equipped to properly support and promote an up-and-coming rock band since its roster was primarily folk artists. Arrogance parted from Vanguard after the one release. By this time folk rock was waning in popularity, so the band changed its focus back to its roots in rock and roll. Rod Abernethy, the final member of Arrogance, joined on lead guitar in 1976.

In 1980, Arrogance signed a label agreement with Warner Brothers' Curb Records and recorded Suddenly in California. After parting ways with Warner/Curb, they captured their live energy on Lively in 1981, under Moonlight Records, including an EP of covers by their alter ego, Dogbreath. In 2002, GAFF Music published a collection of their 1982 work and unreleased tracks as The 5’11” Record.

== Discography ==
- "Black Death" (single) (1970)
- ”Knights Of Dreams” (Unreleased debut studio album recorded April 1971, officially released 2016 by Numero Group.)
- Give Us a Break (1973)
- Prolepsis (1975)
- Rumors (1976)
- Suddenly (1980)
- Lively (1981)
- The 5'11" Record (2002)

== See also ==
- Music of North Carolina
