= Red Clay Ramblers =

US musical group

- Origin: North Carolina, U.S.
- Genre: Old time
- Website: redclayramblers.com

The Red Clay Ramblers are a North Carolina–based band founded in Durham, North Carolina, performing continuously since their formation in 1972. The current touring band has been together since 1987, with Jack Herrick (trumpet, bass), Bland Simpson (piano), Clay Buckner (fiddle), and Chris Frank (guitar). The original members included Mike Craver (guitar, piano) Tommy Thompson (banjo), Bill Hicks (fiddle), and Jim Watson (mandolin, guitar).

== Career ==
Mike Craver joined Red Clay Ramblers in 1973, and recorded with them on their first record (with Tom Carter, Fiddlin’ Al McCanless, and Laurel Urton), which was released by Folkways under the title The Red Clay Ramblers with Fiddlin' Al McCanless. The quartet continued their recording career with Stolen Love on the Flying Fish label, recorded in 1974 and released in 1975 during their successful run in "Diamond Studs." Jack Herrick joined the band in 1976 as a bass and trumpet player. The band recorded, concertized and performed in theatrical productions, most notably Diamond Studs (Bland Simpson/Jim Wann) off-Broadway in 1975. Their 1977 recording, Merchants Lunch, described a trucker's disastrous visit to a Nashville diner. (The diner still exists at the same location, but has been renamed the "Merchant's Restaurant").

The recordings produced by the Red Clay Ramblers during their first decade include Stolen Love, Twisted Laurel, Merchants Lunch, Meeting in the Air, Chuckin' the Frizz, and Hard Times, all on the Flying Fish label, and all available as CDs through Rounder Records. The first decade of the Ramblers also produced album-collaborations with other musicians, including Debby McClatchy in 1976 and Si Kahn in 1981. Chuckin' the Frizz is noteworthy as a live album. Meeting is an album of all Carter Family songs featuring the singing of Tommy Thompson, Mike Craver, and Jim Watson. These early albums featured several writing collaborations by Mike Craver and Tommy Thompson, the most "famous" of which are "Merchants Lunch" and "The Ace." Debby McClatchy recorded Hicks' most infamous original composition, "You Were Only F**king, While I Was Making Love."

Fiddler Clay Buckner joined the band when fiddler Bill Hicks left the band in 1981. The Red Clay Ramblers continued to perform steadily, including an Off-Broadway production of Sam Shepard's Lie of the Mind in 1985–86. Following that production the personnel of the group changed, with Shawn Colvin and Bland Simpson replacing Watson and Craver. Colvin left the band August 1987, replaced by Chris Frank on guitar-accordion-tuba.

The lineup of Thompson, Herrick, Buckner, Simpson and Frank toured internationally from 1987 through 1993, including scoring two Sam Shepard movies (Far North, 1988 and Silent Tongue, 1994). They acted in Silent Tongue, appearing as an 1870s medicine show band, where they met clowns Bill Irwin and David Shiner and spawned the seeds of what became Fool Moon, which they first performed on Broadway between February and September 1993. Fool Moon returned to Broadway twice more (1995, 1998) and won a Special Tony Award in June, 1999.

Cartoonist Doug Marlette collaborated with Bland Simpson and Jack Herrick of the Red Clay Ramblers on a musical comedy adaptation of his Kudzu (comic strip), as "Kudzu, A Southern Musical," produced in North Carolina and Washington, D.C., in 1998. The Ramblers issued a CD of songs from the show, with cover art by Marlette.

Founder Tommy Thompson, who retired from the band at the end of 1993, suffering from Alzheimers, died on January 24, 2003.. Bill Hicks, who left the band in 1981, died on November 11, 2018.

The band continues to perform and record as a quartet, with banjoist Rick Good of Dayton, Ohio, and drummer Rob Ladd, including composed works for the Atlanta Ballet (2003) and the Carolina Ballet (2005), and the musical Lone Star Love, which played off-Broadway in 2004–2005, and had a failed pre-Broadway tryout in Seattle in 2007.

== Partial discography ==
- The Red Clay Ramblers with Fiddlin' Al McCanless (1974)
- Stolen Love (1975)
- Twisted Laurel (1976)
- Debby McClatchy with the Red Clay Ramblers (Innisfree/Green Linnet, 1976)
- Merchants Lunch (1977)
- Chuckin' the Frizz (1979)
- Hard Times (1981)
- It Ain't Right (1986)
- The Music of Sam Shepard's 'A Lie of a Mind' (1986)
- Sam Shepard's 'Far North' (1989)
- Rambler (Sugar Hill, 1992)
- Live (1997)
- Yonder (2002)
- Kudzu (2003)
- Rambleshoe (2005)
- Lone Star Love (2006)
- Fool Moon, the Music (2007)
- Old North State (2009)
