= Bill Irwin =

American actor, choreographer, clown and comedian (born 1950)

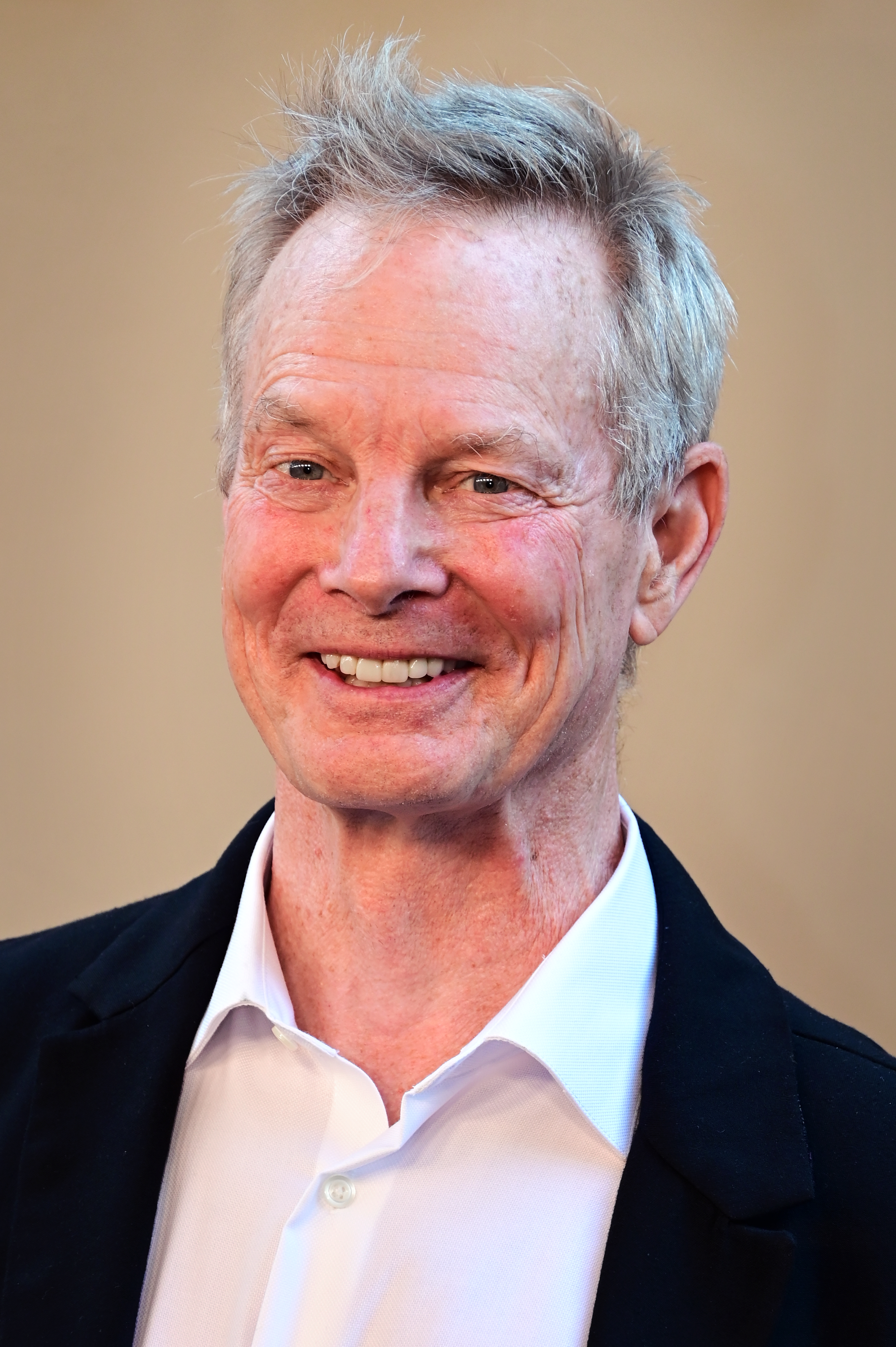
- Irwin in 2026
- Born: William Mills Irwin; April 11, 1950 (age 76); Santa Monica, California, U.S.
- Education: Oberlin College (BA)
- Occupations: Actor; choreographer; clown; comedian
- Years active: 1974–present
- Spouses: Kimi Okada (m. 1977; div. 1982); Martha Roth (m. 1990)
- Children: 1

William Mills Irwin (born April 11, 1950) is an American actor, choreographer, clown, and comedian. He began as a vaudeville-style stage performer and has been noted for his contribution to the renaissance of American circus during the 1970s. He won a Tony Award for his role in Who's Afraid of Virginia Woolf?. He also worked as a choreographer on Broadway and was nominated for the Tony Award for Best Choreography in 1989 for Largely New York. He is also known as Mr. Noodle on the Sesame Street segment Elmo's World, and he appeared in the Sesame Street film short Does Air Move Things?

Irwin has made a number of appearances on film, including Stepping Out (1991), Hot Shots! (1991), How the Grinch Stole Christmas, Rachel Getting Married (2008), and the Christopher Nolan films Interstellar (2014) and The Odyssey (2026).

On television, he recurred as Dr. Peter Lindstrom on Law & Order: Special Victims Unit, and as "The Dick & Jane Killer" on CSI: Crime Scene Investigation. From 2017 to 2019, he appeared as Cary Loudermilk on the FX television series Legion.

== Early life ==
Irwin was born on April 11, 1950, in Santa Monica, California, to Elizabeth (née Mills), a teacher, and Horace G. Irwin, an aerospace engineer. He attended the theater school at California Institute of the Arts from 1970 to 1972. After CalArts theater instructor Herbert Blau obtained a new position at Oberlin College in 1972, Irwin transferred to Oberlin to continue studies with Blau. Irwin graduated from Oberlin College in 1974 with a degree in theatre arts and attended Ringling Brothers and Barnum & Bailey Clown College the following year. In 1975, he helped found the Pickle Family Circus in San Francisco, California. He credits his experience with the circus, and performing in schools under the Comprehensive Employment and Training Act, as having made him a working artist. In 1979, Irwin left the company to pursue stage work.

== Career ==
=== Creator and writer ===
Irwin has created several highly regarded stage shows that incorporate elements of clowning, often in collaboration with composer Doug Skinner. These works included The Regard of Flight (1982), which ran on Broadway at the Vivian Beaumont Theatre in April 1987 for 17 performances, Largely New York (1989), Fool Moon (1993), The Harlequin Studies (2003), and Mr. Fox: A Rumination (2004). Mr. Fox is a production that Irwin has worked on for years, a biography of 19th century clown George Washington Lafayette Fox that also has autobiographical elements. In 2013, he teamed with his occasional partner David Shiner to create and perform in the Off-Broadway "clowning revue-with-music" Old Hats along with actress and musician Nellie McKay. Old Hats won the 2013 Drama Desk Award for Outstanding Revue. Old Hats was revived in New York City in 2016, with Shiner and Irwin returning and a new third performer, musician Shaina Taub, performing with her band between the sketches.

He adapted Molière's play Les Fourberies de Scapin as a comedy called Scapin, and has played the title role in several productions. He appeared in the play at the off-Broadway Roundabout Theatre Company Laura Pels Theatre in January through March 1997, after performing in the play at the Seattle Rep. His adaptation allowed him to incorporate his signature clowning routines into the course of the action.

Irwin performed with The Cadets Drum and Bugle Corps at the 1996 Summer Olympics, in a "band on the run" sequence where he played Dr. Hubert Peterson of the fictitious Federation of United Marching Associations of America.

=== Actor ===
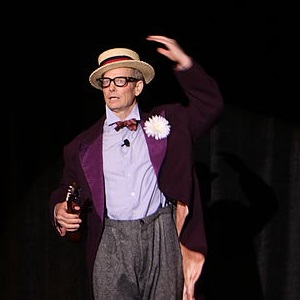
Irwin in 2013

Although Irwin is best known for his theatrical clown work, he has also been featured in a number of dramatic plays. Irwin appeared with Steve Martin and Robin Williams in the Lincoln Center Off-Broadway production of Waiting for Godot, in 1988, in the role of Lucky. Lucky's only lines consist of a famous 500-word-long monologue, an ironic element for Irwin since much of his clown-based stage work was silent.

He directed the 1998 Roundabout Theatre Company production of A Flea in Her Ear. He appeared in 2002 with Sally Field in the replacement cast of The Goat or Who is Sylvia? In 2005, he starred as George alongside Kathleen Turner in a revival of Edward Albee's Who's Afraid of Virginia Woolf?, for which he won a Tony Award. He played Vladimir (Didi) in the 2009 Broadway revival of Waiting for Godot, and Mr. McAfee in the Broadway revival of Bye Bye Birdie. In 2011, he appeared in King Lear at the Public Theatre. In 2023, he played Clov in the Irish Repertory Theatre's Off-Broadway production of Endgame.

=== Film and television ===
Irwin's first featured film role was in 1980, appearing as Harold Hamgravy in Robert Altman's Popeye starring Robin Williams. He has appeared in over 20 films, mainly in supporting roles. Irwin's principal film roles include playing Eddie Collins in Eight Men Out, which tells the story of the "Black Sox" gambling scandal of 1919, and My Blue Heaven, a 1990 comedy with Steve Martin and Rick Moranis. Irwin tap-danced in a leading role in 1991's Stepping Out with Liza Minnelli, appeared as a mime in the Paul Mazursky film Scenes from a Mall alongside Woody Allen and Bette Midler, and played Charlie Sheen's father in Hot Shots! (1991). His authentic vaudevillian skills landed him a role in the Sam Shepard film Silent Tongue in 1994, and he appeared in film adaptations of How the Grinch Stole Christmas, The Laramie Project and A Midsummer Night's Dream. He played an ex-brain surgeon and house salesman in the Nickelodeon series The Adventures of Pete & Pete. In 2006, Irwin played the solitary Mr. Leeds in M. Night Shyamalan's Lady in the Water and had a small role as Uncle Teddy in 2007's Across the Universe. He received critical acclaim for his role as Paul, father to Anne Hathaway's character Kym, in the 2008 drama Rachel Getting Married.

Irwin's most notable television roles have been Enrico Ballati, "The Flying Man", on the television series Northern Exposure, Mr. Noodle in the Elmo's World segment of the PBS children's show Sesame Street, and the "Dick & Jane" serial killer Nate Haskell on CSI: Crime Scene Investigation. He was featured in the 1988 music video of "Don't Worry, Be Happy" by Bobby McFerrin (along with McFerrin and Robin Williams) and the 1996 music video of "Let Me into Your Heart" by Mary Chapin Carpenter. Irwin was also featured in HBO's 1997 production Subway Stories. He has also appeared on The Cosby Show, Saturday Night Live, 3rd Rock from the Sun, Law & Order, and Lights Out.

In 2011, Irwin guest starred in the pilot episode of the CBS television drama A Gifted Man. He starred in the 2013 medical drama TNT television series, Monday Mornings as Buck Tierney. In 2014, he guest starred in the episode "The One Percent Solution" of CBS' Elementary.

Irwin voices the robot TARS in the film Interstellar and puppeteers the robot in most scenes (those which are not computer-generated). He is featured in the PBS series Great Performances, in the episode titled "Bill Irwin, Clown Prince", initially broadcast in December 2004.

He regularly appears on the NBC crime series Law & Order: Special Victims Unit as therapist Dr. Peter Lindstrom. Lindstrom normally appears on the show while counseling main character Captain Olivia Benson. Irwin also appeared on the television series Sleepy Hollow, playing the character of Atticus Nevins. Between 2017 and 2019, he appeared in the FX television series Legion.

In 2020, he appeared as Su'Kal in Star Trek: Discovery. In 2022, Irwin guest starred on The Gilded Age on HBO.

In 2026, Irwin played the gargantuan 60-foot Cyclops, using animatronics, puppetry and voice work, in Christopher Nolan's The Odyssey.

== Personal life ==
He is married to Martha Roth, an "actress-turned-nurse midwife", whom he met while seeking treatment for a stiff neck. They have an adopted son who was born in Guatemala in 1991.

== Awards and honors ==
Irwin was awarded the National Endowment for the Arts Choreographer's Fellowship in 1981 and 1983. In 1984, he was named a Guggenheim Fellow and was the first performance artist to be awarded a five-year MacArthur Fellowship. For Largely New York, he won a New York Drama Critics Circle Special Citation in 1988, and an Outer Critics Circle Award and Drama Desk Award in 1989. This show also received five nominations for Tony Awards.

In 1992, he won an Obie Award for his performance in Texts for Nothing. Together with David Shiner, he won a special Tony Award for Live Theatrical Presentation in 1999 for their show, Fool Moon. In 1993, this show had already won a Drama Desk Award for "Unique Theatrical Experience" and an Outer Critics Circle "Special Achievement" Award.

In 2000, the Jazz Tap Ensemble in Los Angeles received a $10,000 grant from the National Endowment for the Arts (NEA) "for a commission of a new work by Bill Irwin."

In 2004, the Signature Theatre Company (New York), received a $40,000 NEA grant for "the world premiere production of 'Mr. Fox: A Rumination' by Bill Irwin."

In 2005, he won the Tony Award for Best Actor in a Play for his appearance as George in the revival of Edward Albee's Who's Afraid of Virginia Woolf?

Irwin received a 2008 Chicago Film Critics Association Award nomination for "Best Supporting Actor" for his role in Rachel Getting Married. In 2010, The New Victory Theater presented Irwin with the first-ever New Victory Arts Award. He was honored for "bringing the arts to kids and kids to the arts." Nathan Lane and Jonathan Demme spoke at the ceremony. Irwin is also on the board of The New 42nd Street, Inc.

== Acting credits ==
=== Film ===
Key
†	Denotes films that have not yet been released

Film roles
Year	Title	Role	Notes
1980	Popeye	Ham Gravy, the Old Boyfriend	
1988	A New Life	Eric	
1988	Eight Men Out	Eddie Collins	
1990	My Blue Heaven	Kirby	
1991	Scenes from a Mall	Mime	
1991	Hot Shots!	Buzz Harley	
1991	Stepping Out	Geoffrey	
1993	Silent Tongue	Comic	
1993	Manhattan by Numbers	Floyd	
1993	Sister Act 2: Back in the Habit	Unnamed Brother #1	Uncredited
1994	Water Ride	The Man in the Gray Hat	Short film
1998	Illuminata	Marco	
1999	Just the Ticket	Ray Charles	
1999	A Midsummer Night's Dream	Tom Snout	
2000	How the Grinch Stole Christmas	Lou Lou Who	
2001	Elmo's World: The Wild Wild West	Mr. Noodle	Direct-to-video
2002	Igby Goes Down	Lt. Smith	
2004	The Truth About Miranda	Emile	
2004	The Manchurian Candidate	Scoutmaster	
2005	Elmo Visits the Doctor	Mr. Noodle	Direct-to-video
2006	Elmo's World: Reach for the Sky	Mr. Noodle	Direct-to-video
2006	Elmo's World: Pets!	Mr. Noodle	Direct-to-video
2006	Lady in the Water	Mr. Leeds	
2007	Dark Matter	Hal Silver	
2007	Elmo's World: What Makes You Happy?	Mr. Noodle	Direct-to-video
2007	Across the Universe	Uncle Teddy	
2008	Rachel Getting Married	Paul Buchman	
2010	Goldstar, Ohio	Chief Jeff 'Goob' Garver	Short film
2011	Higher Ground	Pastor Bud	
2011	Elmo's World: Penguins and Friends	Additional voices	Direct-to-video
2011	Elmo's World: People in Your Neighborhood	Additional voices	Direct-to-video
2012	Elmo's World - Favorite Things	Additional voices	Direct-to-video
2014	Interstellar	TARS (voice)	Provides puppetry for TARS and CASE
2014	Frozen on Broadway: First Look	Director	Short film
2015	Identity Theft	Mark	Short film
2015	Ricki and the Flash	Single Dad	
2016	Old Hats	Himself	
2018	Ballet Now	Himself	Documentary
2020	Irresistible	Elton Chambers	
2022	Spoiler Alert	Bob	
2023	Rustin	A. J. Muste	
2024	High Tide	Scott	
2026	The Odyssey	Polyphemus	
2026	All That She Wants	TBA	

=== Television ===
Television roles
Year	Title	Role	Notes
1979	Struck by Lightning		Episode: "Frank Meets the Press"
1982	Saturday Night Live	The Dancing Man	Segment: "The Dancing Man"
1983	The Regard of Flight	Performer	TV movie
1987	The Cosby Show	Eddie Bartholomew	Episode: "The Show Must Go On"
1990	The Circus	Pierrot The Clown / Miranda's Father	TV movie
1991–1992	Northern Exposure	Enrico Bellati	2 episodes
1992	The Last Mile	The Maestro	TV short
1992–2010; 2017–present	Sesame Street	Mr. Noodle, Air Mime, Professor Television	Recurring; 25 episodes
1993	Great Performances	Master of Ceremony	Episode: "Sondheim: A Celebration at Carnegie Hall"
1993	TriBeCa	Gene Kelly Clone	Episode: "The Loft"
1994	Monte Video	Clown	Episode: "Erntedankfest"
1996	The Adventures of Pete & Pete	The Broker	Episode: "35 Hours"
1997	Subway Stories	Himself	TV movie; segment: "Subway Car from Hell"
1998	3rd Rock from the Sun	Pickles	Episode: "Pickles and Ice Cream"
2002	The Laramie Project	Harry Woods	TV movie
2006	Law & Order: Criminal Intent	Nate Royce	Episode: "Masquerade"
2008	Law & Order	Ellison Conway	Episode: "Bogeyman"
2008	Life on Mars	Dr. Schwahn	Episode: "Tuesday's Dead"
2008–2011	CSI: Crime Scene Investigation	Nate Haskell	Recurring
2011	The Good Wife	Fred Medkiff	Episode: "Ham Sandwich"
2011	Lights Out	Hal Brennan	Recurring
2011	A Gifted Man	Ron Vinetz	Episode: "Pilot"
2013	Monday Mornings	Dr. Buck Tierney	Main cast
2013–2022	Law & Order: Special Victims Unit	Dr. Peter Lindstrom	Recurring; 17 episodes
2014	Elementary	Richard Balsille	Episode: "The One Percent Solution"
2014	Blue Bloods	Cardinal Brennan	2 episodes
2015	South of Hell	Enos Abascal	Main cast
2015–2016	Sleepy Hollow	Atticus Nevins	4 episodes
2016	Confirmation	Jack Danforth	TV movie
2016	Quarry	Harlowe	Episode: "Seldom Realized"
2017	Julie's Greenroom	Himself	2 episodes
2017	Doubt	Judge	2 episodes
2017–2019	Legion	Cary Loudermilk	Main cast
2018, 2022	This Is Us	Dr. Spencer	2 episodes
2020–2021	Star Trek: Discovery	Su'Kal	3 episodes
2021	New Amsterdam	Grandpa Calvin	3 episodes
2022	The Gilded Age	Cornelius Eckhard	Episode: "Face the Music"
2022	The Dropout	Channing Robertson	4 episodes
2022	The Andy Warhol Diaries	Andy Warhol (voice)	6 episodes
2025	The Beast in Me	James Ingram	2 episodes

=== Music videos ===
Music videos
Year	Title	Role	Notes
1988	"Don't Worry, Be Happy"	Himself	Music video; Bobby McFerrin
1996	"Let Me into Your Heart"	Himself	Music video; Mary Chapin Carpenter

=== Stage ===
Stage work
Year	Title	Role	Notes
1984	Accidental Death of an Anarchist	The Sergeant	Broadway
1987	The Regard of Flight	Writer and performer	Broadway
1988	Waiting for Godot	Lucky	Off-Broadway; Drama Desk Award nomination
1989	Largely New York	The Post-Modern Hoofer; Director, choreographer, and writer	Broadway; Drama Desk Award for Unique Theatrical Experience; Tony Award nominations for Best Actor in a Play, Best Choreography, Best Direction of a Play, and Best Play
1993	Fool Moon	Creator and performer	Broadway
1995	Fool Moon	Creator and performer	Broadway
1998	Fool Moon	Creator and performer	Broadway
2002	The Goat, or Who Is Sylvia?	Martin	Broadway
2005	Who's Afraid of Virginia Woolf?	George	Broadway; Tony Award; Drama Desk Award nomination
2007	Who's Afraid of Virginia Woolf?	George	National tour
2009	Waiting for Godot	Vladimir	Broadway; Drama Desk Award nomination
2009	Bye Bye Birdie	Harry MacAfee	Broadway
2011	King Lear	The Fool	Off-Broadway; Drama Desk Award nomination
2014	Show Boat	Cap'n Andy Hawks	San Francisco Opera
2018	The Iceman Cometh	Ed Mosher	Broadway
2019	Gary: A Sequel to Titus Andronicus	Movement choreographer	Broadway
2023	Endgame	Clov	Off-Broadway
2024	On Beckett	Himself	Guthrie Theater
2024	Eureka Day	Don	Broadway
2026	The Imaginary Invalid	Argan; Adaptation by	Broadway
