= Bland Simpson =

American novelist

Bland Simpson is an American author, professor, and musician from North Carolina.

== Early life ==
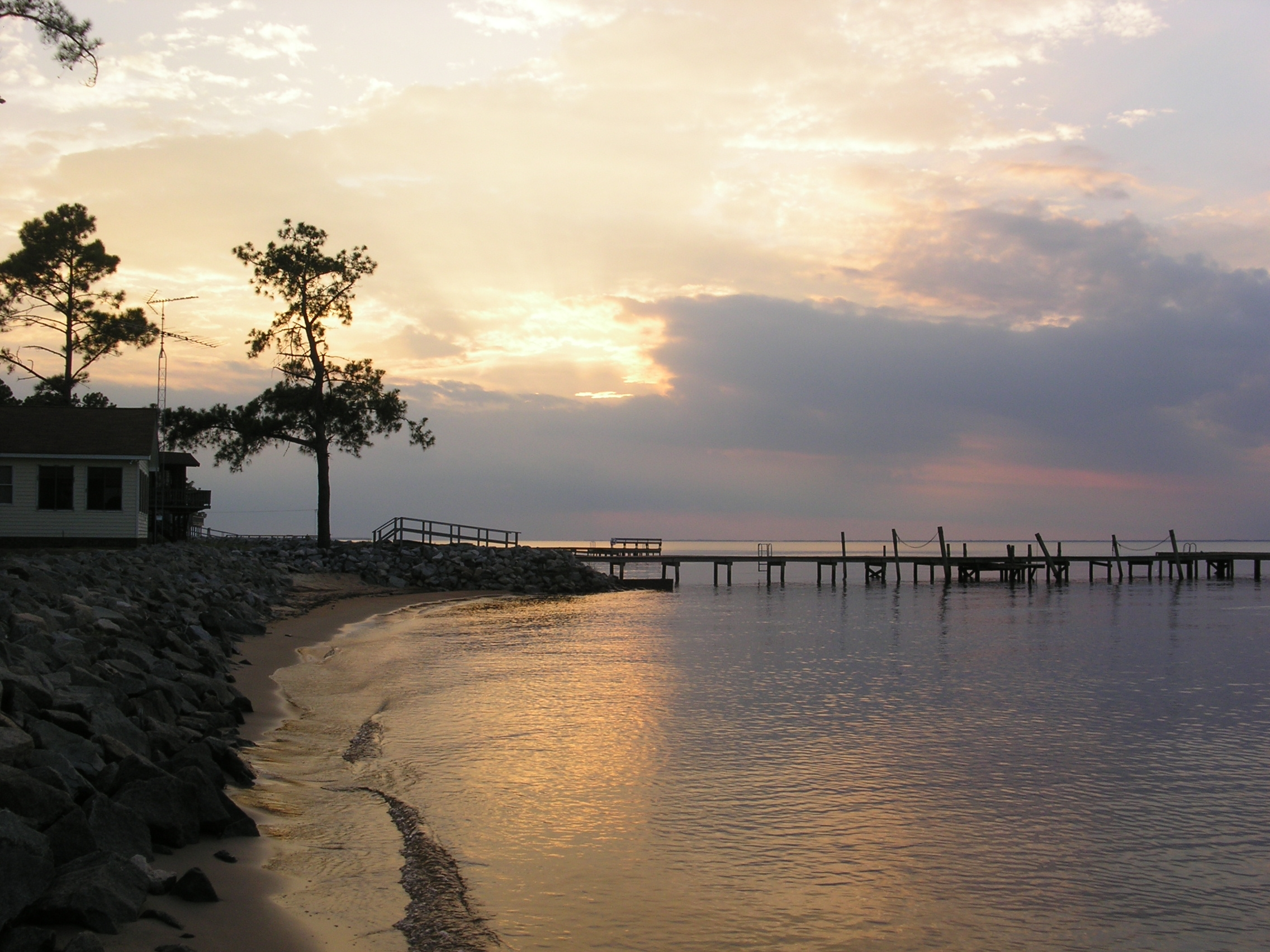
Albemarle Sound, NC

Simpson grew up in the northeastern area of North Carolina in Elizabeth City and spent much of his time around the Albemarle Sound. He completed his undergraduate degree at the University of North Carolina at Chapel Hill. In the middle of his undergraduate career, Simpson left the university to spend time songwriting in New York, particularly for musical theater. He later returned to UNC-Chapel Hill to finish his degree, and graduated in 1973 with a major in political science.

== Career ==
=== Teaching ===
Simpson began teaching creative writing at his alma mater in 1982. He is the Kenan Distinguished Professor of English and creative writing at University of North Carolina at Chapel Hill. Simpson was the creative writing program's director from 2002 to 2008, and the faculty representative for the UNC-Chapel Hill General Alumni Association's Board of Directors from 2011 to 2012.

Simpson was awarded many awards for writing and teaching. Among them are the Chapman Award for Excellence in Teaching, which he received twice, and the Tanner Award for Excellence in Undergraduate Teaching.

=== Writing ===
He has written several books, including The Great Dismal and The Mystery of Beautiful Nell Cropsey. Some of his books also feature photography by his wife, conservationist Ann Cary Simpson (Into the Sound Country, Inner Islands, Little Rivers & Waterway Tales).

Simpson is well-versed Eastern North Carolina's mysteries, geography and culture. His works focus on North Carolina's coast and natural elements and enforce the appreciation and protection of these resources.

Simpson is also a member of the North Carolina Coastal Federation. His work with the Coastal Federation allows him to learn about the systems of eastern Carolina estuaries. Simpson draws inspiration from this information when writing about the coast and coastal plain.

=== Music and Performances ===
Simpson has written music and lyrics for, as well as performed in, a number of plays which have been performed Off-Broadway, at Ford's Theater in Washington, and other prominent venues; his plays include Diamond Studs, Kudzu, Fool Moon, and King Mackerel And The Blues Are Running. Simpson also wrote a song for Tony-nominated musical Pump Boys & Dinettes.

Simpson also wrote "Follow You All Over the World" by Marti Jones, from her 1985 debut solo album Unsophisticated Time.

He was awarded the North Carolina Award for Fine Arts in November 2005.

Simpson is also the long-time pianist for The Red Clay Ramblers, the Tony Award-winning string band. After his time songwriting in New York, he and Jim Wann, another UNC-Chapel Hill alumnus, wrote the musical Diamond Studs. This musical led Simpson to work and perform with The Red Clay Ramblers.

When Simpson and Wann were writing Diamond Studs, they were in a band called the Southern States Fidelity Choir. They invited The Red Clay Ramblers to perform with them in a show about outlaw Jesse James. When they performed this show in Chapel Hill in 1974, the Chelsea Theater Center of Brooklyn noticed and took interest, moving the show to New York. Simpson continued to work closely with The Red Clay Ramblers, even as band members continuously changed. Despite his constant work with the band, he did not become an official member until the end of 1986.

Simpson has toured North America, Europe, the Middle East, and North Africa with The Red Clay Ramblers.

Starting in September 2001, he has also worked with The Red Clay Ramblers and others to produce choreographed ballets of their music. These ballets have been performed in places such as the Fox Theater in Atlanta, GA and the Raleigh Memorial Auditorium in Raleigh, NC.

== Bibliography ==
- Heart of the Country, A Novel of Southern Music
- The Great Dismal, A Carolinian’s Swamp Memoir
- The Mystery of Beautiful Nell Cropsey, A Nonfiction Novel
- Ghost Ship of Diamond Shoals, The Mystery of the Carroll A. Deering, A Nonfiction Novel
- Into the Sound Country: A Carolinian’s Coastal Plain
- The Inner Islands, A Carolinian's Sound Country Chronicle
- The Coasts of Carolina, Seaside to Sound Country
- North Carolina, Land of Water, Land of Sky
- Clover Garden: A Carolinian's Piedmont Memoir
