= Marti Jones =

American singer and visual artist

- Genres: Alternative country Rock music Folk music Jangle pop
- Occupation: Singer-songwriter
- Instrument(s): Vocals, guitar
- Years active: 1980s-present
- Labels: A&M Records; RCA Records; Sugar Hill Records; Dixon Archival Remnants
- Website: martijonesdixon.com

Marti Jones is an American singer and visual artist known for her albums (solo and with husband Don Dixon) and her paintings. She exhibits visual art as "Marti Jones Dixon."

== Early life ==
Marti Jones grew up in Uniontown, Ohio, United States near Akron, Ohio. She performed with her sisters in a folk music group and graduated from Kent State University in 1979 with a degree in studio art. While in school, she performed in solo, duo, and trio contexts.

== Career ==
=== Color Me Gone ===
Producer and songwriter Liam Sternberg gave Jones her first studio experience singing demos, and suggested she join Akron band Color Me Gone who needed a lead singer. The band recorded one EP for A&M Records in 1983. Jones also recorded a demo of the Sternberg-composed "Walk Like an Egyptian." After hearing Jones' rendition, the Bangles recorded the song and it became a worldwide number one hit.

=== A&M Recordings ===
Her first solo album, 1985's Unsophisticated Time (A&M Records), was produced by Don Dixon. Jones covered songs by The dB's, The Bongos, Elvis Costello, and Dixon. The album featured Anne Richmond Boston (vocals) and Mitch Easter (guitar).

Jones and Dixon married in 1988, and Dixon produced and wrote songs for all of her subsequent albums.

She recorded two more albums for A&M Records – Match Game (1986) and Used Guitars (1988) – featuring a wide range of supporting musicians (including Marshall Crenshaw, Mitch Easter, The Uptown Horns, Paul Carrack, T Bone Burnett, Darlene Love and others). These albums featured original material (written by Dixon, or Dixon and Jones together), and covers of songs by Janis Ian, Elvis Costello, John Hiatt, Jackie DeShannon, Richard Barone, and Graham Parker. Jones' sound encompassed jangle pop, ballads, and southern-style soul. Her voice and singing style reminded some observers of Dusty Springfield, who mined a similarly eclectic field of pop music; others compared her voice to that of Linda Ronstadt, Bonnie Raitt, or Annie Lennox.

=== Any Kind of Lie ===
In 1990, Jones moved to RCA Records to record Any Kind Of Lie. She relied more on original material and adapted an adult-contemporary sound. She was dropped by RCA after one album.

=== Sugar Hill Recordings ===
After losing her label, Jones, 35, decided to settle down and have a child (Shane Marie Dixon). In 1996, Sugar Hill Records released a pair of Jones albums only a few months apart. Live at Spirit Square was an August 29, 1990, live recording at the Spirit Square Center for the Arts, documenting the Any Kind of Lie tour.

My Long-Haired Life was a return to her previous method of blending original songs and covers. Having cut her characteristically long hair when she became a mother, the album title alludes to her life of singing back when her hair was long. The album's cover shows a self-painted portrait of Jones sitting in a barber's chair, her golden locks strewn on the floor.

=== Dixon Archival Remnants Recordings ===
2002's My Tidy Doily Dream was a slower tempo album, featuring songwriting collaborations with Richard Barone and Kelley Ryan of astroPuppees.

After that, Jones curtailed her singing career for a time, and focused on painting.

In 2003, Jones recorded the song "Room With a View" for a tribute to Let's Active's Every Word.

In 2006, she toured with singer-songwriter Amy Rigby as The Cynical Girls.

In 2008, Jones and Dixon released the download-only album Lucky Stars: New Lullabies for Old Souls A departure from Jones' and Dixon's previous sound, this recording began as a request from a friend who was putting together an album of lullabies to sell in hospitals to new parents. The album featured six vocal songs and five instrumentals.

In fall of 2009, Jones and Dixon toured, performing a series of live acoustic performances.

In 2010, Jones and Dixon recorded Living Stereo, a proper duet album.

In 2014, Jones released You're Not the Bossa Me, which incorporates bossa nova rhythms and sensibilities into her own musical themes.

== Discography ==
=== Marti Jones ===
- 1985: Unsophisticated Time (A&M Records)
- 1986: Match Game (A&M Records)
- 1988: Used Guitars (A&M Records)
- 1990: Any Kind Of Lie (RCA Records)
- 1996: My Long-Haired Life (Sugar Hill Records)
- 1996: Live From Spirit Square (Sugar Hill Records)
- 2002: My Tidy Doily Dream (Dixon Archival Remnants Records)
- 2014: You're Not The Bossa Me (Dixon Archival Remnants Records)

=== Marti Jones and Don Dixon ===
- 2008: Lucky Stars: New Lullabies for Old Souls (Dixon Archival Remnants Records)
- 2011: Living Stereo (Dixon Archival Remnants Records)

=== Appears on ===
- 1984: Color Me Gone – Color Me Gone (A&M Records SP-12504)
- 1987: Don Dixon – Romeo at Juilliard (Enigma Records 3243-1)
- 1987: Marshall Crenshaw – Mary Jean & 9 Others (Warner Bros. Records 9 25583-1
- 1988: The Smithereens – Green Thoughts (Capitol Records C1-48375)
- 1988: Various Artists – Back to the Beach (Columbia Records 460118 1)
- 1989: Andrew Cash – Boomtown (Island Records 842 597)
- 1989: Don Dixon – EEE (Enigma Records 3356-1)
- 1989: Don Dixon – Chi-Town Budget Show (Enigma Records 4D-0601)
- 1990: Mary Chapin Carpenter – Shooting Straight in the Dark (Columbia Records CK-46077)
- 1991: Various Artists – Yuletide (Black Vinyl Records BV12591-2)
- 1992: Don Dixon – If I'm A Ham, Well You're A Sausage (Restless Records 7 72584-2)
- 1992: Joe Cocker – Night Calls (Capitol Records C2-97801)
- 1992: Various Artists – Back to the Garden: A Tribute to Joni Mitchell (Intrepid Records N21-00016)
- 1994: The Moody Brothers – Guitar Boogie (Lamon Records 10235)
- 1995: The Smithereens – Attack of the Smithereens (Capitol Records 32247)
- 1997: Robert Shafer – Hillbilly Fever (New Rounder / Upstart UPSTART 028)
- 1999: Julie Adams – I Don't Mind Walking (Gadfly Records 246)
- 1999: The Smithereens – God Save the Smithereens (Koch KOCCD 8057)
- 1999: Treva – Better Late Than Never (Avert)
- 2000: Don Dixon – The Invisible Man (Gadfly Records 262)
- 2000: Robert Crenshaw – Victory Songs (Gadfly Records 267)
- 2000: Various Artists – Forever Dusty: A Tribute To Dusty Springfield (R & D Records 31012)
- 2001: Various Artists – Shoe Fetish: A Tribute To Shoes (Parasol Records PAR-CD-065)
- 2003: Robert Crenshaw – Dog Dreams (Gadfly Records 285)
- 2003: Various Artists – Every Word: A Tribute to Let's Active (Laughing Outlaw Records 61)
- 2005: astroPuppees – Sugar Beat (Manatee Records 9302)
- 2005: Jeffrey Dean Foster – Million Star Hotel (Angel Skull Records 0818)
- 2006: Don Dixon – The Entire Combustible World in One Small Room (125 Records 12)
- 2007: Bell & Cooper – Postcards out of the Blue (Dogjaw Records 03378)
- 2007: Michael Stanley – The Soft Addictions (ItsAboutMusic.com / Line Level IAM 8567)
- 2009: Don Dixon – The Nu-Look (Dixon Archival Remnants Records 012)
- 2010: Kelley Ryan – Twist (Manatee Records 004)
- 2012: Kelley Ryan – Cocktails (Manatee Records 5638023745)
- 2013: Various Artists – The Del Shannon Tribute: Songwriter, Vol. 1 (Rockbeat Records ROC-CD-3192)
