= The Fabulous Knobs =

American rock band

- Origin: Raleigh, North Carolina, United States
- Genres: Rock and roll; Rhythm and blues
- Years active: 1978–present
- Label: Moonlight Records
- Spinoffs: The Woodpeckers; The Woods; Terry Anderson and the Olympic Ass Kickin' Team
- Members: Terry Anderson - drums Jack Cornell – bass Debra DeMilo – lead vocals Keith Taylor – lead guitar Dave Adams – keyboards
- Past members: David Enloe – guitar

The Fabulous Knobs is an American rock band formed in Raleigh, North Carolina, in 1978. They were one of the key players in the North Carolina music scene during the 1980s, frequently performing at venues in downtown Raleigh. One contemporary reviewer noted, "With skin-tight rhythms and spare, jangling guitar lines, The Fabulous Knobs play punchy dance music that vacillates between R&B and new wave".

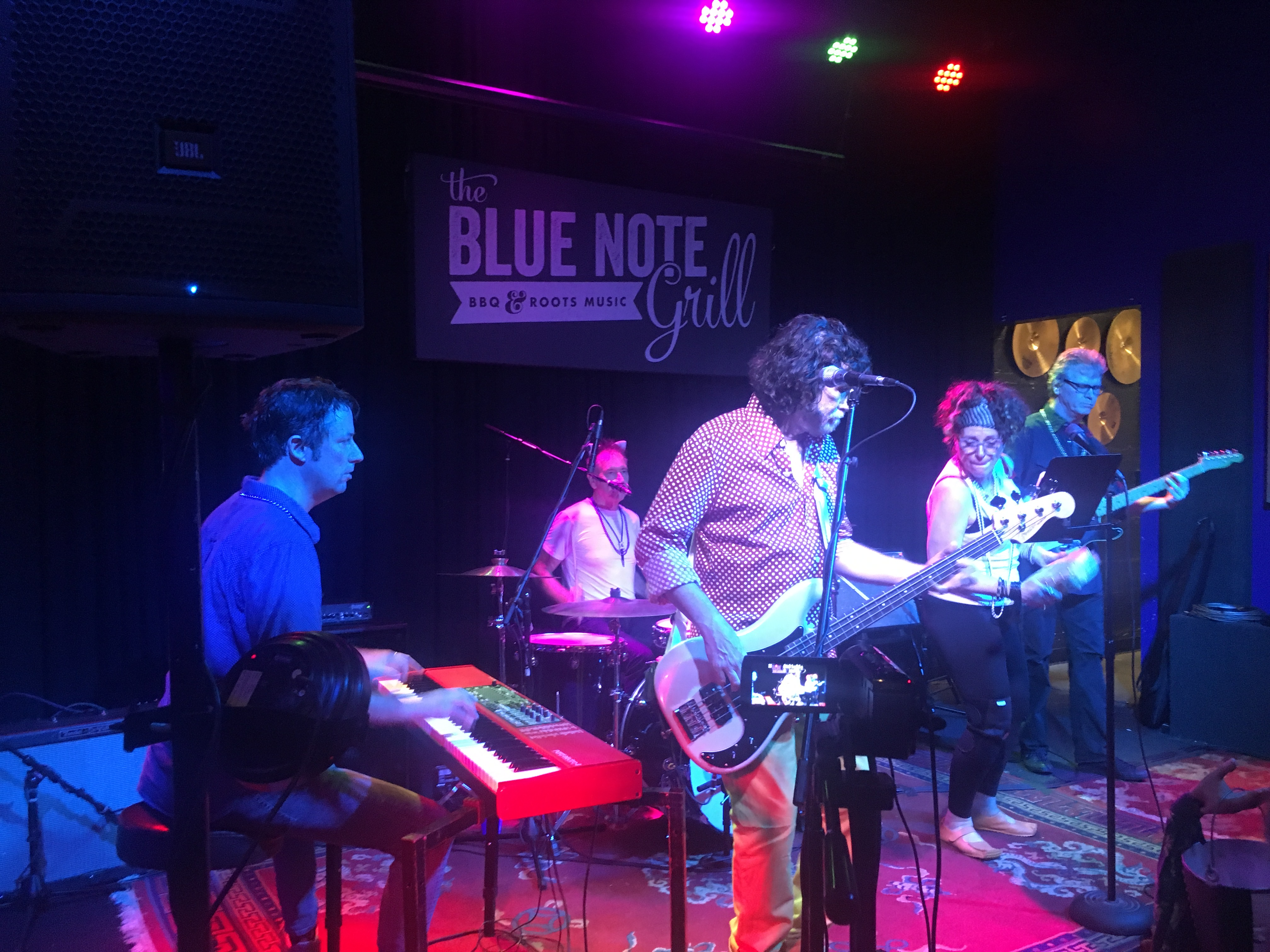
Performing at The Blue Note Grill (Durham, NC) on July 28, 2018

== Background ==
Future band leader Terry Anderson and David Enloe, both born on Christmas Day 1956 in Southern Pines, North Carolina, met over music, playing recorders in a fourth–grade class at Powell Elementary in Raleigh. At the age of 14, Anderson started playing drums at his father's bluegrass country combo, The Wake County Ramblers. When Enloe got a Gibson ES–335 guitar, they decided to create a band of their own. Their little band was called Rooster and performed only once, at William G. Enloe High School.

After graduation, Terry and David both went to Sandhills Community College, where they continued to play occasionally. When they put up a notice for a bass player, they got a response from someone named Jade Cordero, who turned out to be Jack Cornell. Soon, they were also joined by Debra DeMilo on vocals and Bob Wallace on lead guitar to form the core of The Fabulous Knobs. According to Cornell, they picked the band's name "because we thought it sounded funny."

After graduating from Sandhills Community College, the band relocated to Raleigh in 1978, where they were joined by Keith Taylor, who replaced Bob Wallace on lead guitar, and Dave Adams of Glass Moon on keyboards. Lead singer DeMilo quickly became known as "Mick [Jagger] with the voice of Aretha Franklin", with her trademark thrift-shop style and quirky haircut.

== The Band ==
The Fabulous Knobs began performing in local clubs in 1979, becoming a full–time band that played four or five times a week along the East Coast. They consistently packed the Raleigh bars such as The Brewery, Free Advice, and The Pier. At that time, they lived together at their “Knob World Headquarters,” a big yellow house on Edenton Street in Raleigh's historic Oakwood where they wrote songs by day and practiced at night, They hauled their own gear in an orange box truck nicknamed The Big O that lacked air conditioning”.

A typical Knobs show included a 50/50 split between original songs written by Anderson, Enloe, and Cornell and their rock spin on R&B covers of songs by Chuck Berry, Eddie Cochran, The Rolling Stones, Aretha Franklin, Smokey Robinson, and Stevie Wonder—along with their infamous original mini-plays or skits. Their "experimental theater... irritated club owner". "In one of their onstage skits, Enloe would lie on the ground and pretend to be sleeping while the rest of the band pretended to push lawn mowers around the stage. Eventually, he [Enloe] would holler, 'Go to Hell!' And playing would resume." Taylor liked to play comedian Jerry Clower's "stories about coon hunting and fried chicken" from a cassette player that he held up to the microphone. Despite the fact that Clower's routines could last as long as five minutes, Taylor recalls that, "Terry would hit you with a frickin' drumstick" if you talked during Clower. Other antics involved the band Arrogance who played The P–, the biggest club in Raleigh, as often as The Fabulous Knobs. It was common for these bands to crash each other's sets. One night, when both bands were playing at The Pier, the bands switched songs, playing the other's music their entire performance.

In 1984, the Knobs auditioned for the television show Star Search, but were not selected. Anderson says DeMilo was "too bawdy" and "scared the judges".

=== Next Big Thing (1980) / The Fabulous Knobs (1981) ===
The Fabulous Knobs released their first EP Next Big Thing in 1980 with regional label Moonlight Records. The EP was recorded at Lets Active member Mitch Easter's Drive-In Studio in Winston-Salem. It was produced by Don Dixon and Robert Kirkland of Arrogance, with Dixon and Easter serving as engineers Their label reissued Next Big Thing as The Fabulous Knobs in 1981. Reviewers noted the recording was "a bit of a disappointment" and "captures only about half the intensity of their live performance." In 1981, the band recorded a low-budget video of the track "Please You No More," directed by Steve Boyle.

All music is composed by The Fabulous Knobs.

No.	Title	Length
1.	"Next Big Thing"	4:05
2.	"Fool For Your Love"	3:18
3.	"Please You No More"	3:36
4.	"I'm Tired Of Hearin' About It"	3:28

=== Hugs and Kisses (1981) ===
The Fabulous Knobs’ 1981 album Hugs and Kisses or OXOXOXOX was the first local hit for Moonlight Records, and was heavily promoted by regional record chain Record Bar. Once again, the band went to Mitch Easter's Drive-In Studio to record. The seven tracks on the album were already well–known to fans from shows, giving it an automatic audience. Again working with director Steve Boyle, the band created corresponding videos for the tracks "Don't Stop" and "Make It Stick." The latter was recorded live at The Pier on February 26, 1982.

All music is composed by The Fabulous Knobs.

No.	Title	Length
1.	"Don't Stop"	2:20
2.	"Make It Stick"	3:54
3.	"Why"	1:02
4.	"Edge"	2:55
5.	"Long Dark Night"	3:45
6.	"String of Pearls"	3:19
7.	"I Don't Know Why"	3:45

== Breakup ==
The Fabulous Knobs never secured a major label deal and broke up in 1984. Music critic Josh Shaffer wrote, "It's a puzzle why a band with such a consistent and devoted following never got bigger... except that the Fabulous Knobs experience was much better up–close and in person than on their records." In an interview, the band noted, "It became kind of pointless without a major label deal. We didn't want to remain a bar band forever". However, the band did play occasional "reunion" shows in 1990. Reviewer David Manconi wrote, "Back in their heyday... The Fabulous Knobs were North Carolina's very own version of the Rolling Stones—local royalty and rock stars, even if they never got any bigger than nightclubs. But they were pretty much the last word in liquor-fueled good times before scattering".

In 2015, the Cameron Village Subway, Raleigh's "live-music epicenter" from 1971 to 1984 and home of the "flagship club" The Pier, opened its doors for the first time in 30 years before becoming a supermarket The event was called One Night Only: The Underground Comes Alive and included display of photos popular bands who used to play there—The Fabulous Knobs were included, alongside photos of Marshall Crenshaw and R.E.M.

== Aftermath ==
=== The Woods ===
Post break–up, Anderson, Cornell, and Enloe created a band called the Collard Boys, then Woodpeckers, with Dan Baird. When Baird left the band in 1986 for a recording contract with his other band, Georgia Satellites, he had a Billboard charting Gold record with "Battleship Chains," a song Anderson had composed for the Woodpeckers.

The remaining members of the Woodpeckers, continued on as The Woods, often playing with Adams on keyboards or Ron Bartholomew (The Hanks, The Accelerators) on bass. A unique characteristic of The Woods was Anderson, Cornell, and Enloe all contributed songs and took turns singing lead vocals.

In 1985. The Woods' singled "Battleship Chains" was included in Welcome From Comboland: A Collection of Twelve Artists from North Carolina released by the British indie label Waking Waves Records. The expression "comboland" was coined by Mitch Easter and referred to the music scene in the Raleigh area, This project happened because writer Geoffrey Cheshire III convinced Raleigh's Spectator Magazine to sponsor Greetings From Comboland, a three-cassette promotional sampler of 26 North Carolina bands, including tracks by The Woods, that Cheshire personally delivered in Europe while on vacation.

The Woods recorded their only release, the album It's Like This with the independent 2 Tone Records in 1987. Unfortunately, this album was "poorly produced." For its European release, the album was reissued by Demon and included additional tracks.

The Woods frequently served as the backing band for local performances Don Dixon and toured with Marti Jones as her backing band. The Woods played on Jones' record Used Guitars (A&M, 1988) and Dixon's solo albums Romeo at Juilliard (Enigma, 1987) and Chi-Town Budget Show (Restless Records, 1989). On Used Guitars, Jones recorded her version of The Woods song "I Don't Want Her (Anymore)" written by Enloe, as "I Don't Want Him ( Anymore)".

In 1991, RCA Records paid for The Woods to record a demo with Baird and Bill Lloyd producing, but passed on offering the band a full contract. Enloe said, "There was a big letdown after that [RCA] fell through, and it was hard to be enthusiastic about the band, with no next level to go to." The Woods began recording their second album, but were unable to find a label to release it.

In 1993, The Woods announced they were going on extended hiatus. However, Anderson said, It's just one of them things. Nobody's feelings are hurt, we're all just tired of spinnin' our wheels. It will be a long hiatus, if not a permanent split." The band had a farewell show at The Brewery on October 1, 1993, along with friends Dan Baird, Don Dixon, Jeff Foster (Right Profile), Jamie Hoover (The Spongetones), Marti Jones, and Bill Lloyd. Despite the hiatus announcement, The Woods had, in fact, broken up.

Although never picked up by a major label, The Woods were "Raleigh's favorite Rock and Roll music club band". Cornell said, "We still love it, but nobody else seems to. We just can't seem to move it to another level. And at this point, there's not enough cash, energy or desire to make that happen."

=== The O.A.K. Team ===
After The Woods, Anderson created a new band, along with Cornell, called Terry Anderson and the Olympic Ass Kickin' Team (or O.A.K. Team). For this band, Anderson was the frontman, along with his usual drums. The rest of the O.A.K. team is Cornell on bass, Dave Bartholomew (The Accelerators, Tres Chicas, Caitlyn Cary) on guitar, and Greg Rice on keyboards. The band recorded several albums: Terry Anderson and the Olympic Ass Kickin' Team (2005), You Can't Bite Me with a Monkey in Your Mouth (2005), When the O.A.K. Team Comes to Town (2007), National Champions (2009), More Smooth James & Sweet Sweet Jams (2011)—all on Doublenaught Records.

=== The Yayhoos ===
Anderson and Baird formed a new band, The Yayhoos, with Eric Ambel (Joan Jett & The Blackhearts) on guitar, Keith Christopher on bass, Anderson on drums, and Baird on guitar. The Yahoos recorded two albums, Fear Not the Obvious (Bloodshot Records, 2001) and Put the Hammer Down (Lakeside Lounge Records, 2006). The Yahoos toured the South with Drivin N Cryin, and then played across the U.S and Europe. However, their formula of four singers did not find its audience or a major label.

=== Terry Anderson ===
After The Woods, Anderson worked with NRBQ guitarist Al Anderson with a band, Little T & A, but they were unsuccessful in getting the Nashville deal they were seeking. In addition to his work with various bands, Anderson recorded several solo albums including You Don't Like Me (Eastside Digital,1995), What Else Can Go Right (Eastside Digital, 1996), I'll Drink To That (Not Lame Recordings, 2001), All My Worst.... (2002), and Jimmy's Arcade (Doublenaught, 2017). Cornell played on three of those albums, and Taylor and DeMilo also make guest appearances.

Anderson gained a reputation as a songwriter, with his songs being recorded by Etta James, Jo Dee Messina, Tim McGraw, Volbeat, and others. When Dan Baird issued his first solo album in 1994, Love Songs for the Hearing Impaired, he recorded another Woods' standard written by Anderson, and had another hit with "I Love Your Period," which peaked at number 26 on the Billboard Hot 100. Baird's album also included four songs that Anderson co-wrote with Baird, and Anderson provided backing vocals for the album. One of those songs, "The One I Am." was also released as a single and climbed to number 17 on Billboards' Album Rock Tracks Chart.

Overall, Anderson "is the most commercially successful act in the Triangle…in terms of publishing and songwriting".

=== David Enloe ===
Although not as prolific a writer as Anderson, Enloe did share some of his songs with other artists. Marti Jones recorded "I Don't Want Her (Anymore)" for her 1988 album Used Guitars. Enloe also wrote "Who Let the Cat Out of the Bag," which Don Dixon recorded on both his 1987 album Romeo at Juilliard and his 1988 album Chi-Town Budget Show. After the breakup of The Woods in 1993, Enloe's plan was to complete his English degree at North Carolina State University. Enloe moved to Los Angeles to work with blues/rock singer Sass Jordan. After the end of that partnership, he moved to Minnesota with a new wife, returning to Raleigh in 2006. In November 2007, Enloe died in Raleigh at the age of 50 from complications due to Hepatitis C.

=== Keith Taylor ===
Post-breakup, Taylor played with the house band at Longbranch Saloon in Raleigh. In March 1988, he replaced guitarist David Thrower in Hege V, when that band became known as the solo act George Hedge Hamilton V. Then, Taylor spent over a decade in Nashville, Tennessee, playing with Hamilton V. He toured nationally and internationally with multiple artists including Del Reeves and Billy Joe Royal. His current band Rattle and Shakes is an Americana band based in North Carolina with some former members of Gasoline Stove.

=== Dave Adams & Slackmates ===
In 1986, Adams recorded an unsuccessful solo album, Dancing in my Sleep with Elektra Records, and also did some production work for the Connells. In 1997, he formed The Slackmates to record the album Hot Car Girls with Cornell on bass, Whitt Helton and Clarence Carter on drums, Jeff Anderson and Rod Abernathy (Arrogance, Glass Moon) on guitar, and Adams on keyboards. Later, Adams and Abernathy reformed as the duo Slackmates, writing scores for commercials and games such as "The Hobbit." The latter was also released as an album, The Hobbit - The Complete Original Soundtrack in 2003. Adams also plays in the cover band Suicide Blonde.

=== Soul Mates and DeMilo With Arms ===
After the Knob's breakup, DeMilo worked in promotion and accounting for a Record Bar-owned advertising company. In June 1987, she married Brian Barnes, the bass player for the Chapel Hill band The Blazers. After a two-year hiatus from music, DeMilo expressed an interest in returning, telling reporter Melanie Sill of The News and Observer, "I miss performing. I miss the audiences."

In 1987, DeMilo asked a group of local musicians to back her solo showcase for label executives. She didn't get a recording contract but did continue to play with the group as Soul Mates, enjoying two years of sold-out shows. Soul Mates was a modernized "soul review" that included DeMilo on lead vocals, drummer Scott Davison (Arrogance), bassist Bobby Patterson (Glass Moon), guitarist Terry McInturff (Safehouse), along with Eddie Blair (Nantucket) on Tenor sax, Phil Mazarick on keyboards, Rodney Marsh on baritone sax, and Don Eagle (North Carolina Symphony) on trumpet.

Then, DeMilo moved out of state and out of the local music scene. Eventually, she made it back to North Carolina and was a floral designer in Winston-Salem. One day, she was recognized by musician Ed Baumgardner who "persuaded Debra to go on-stage with an eclectic group of musicians known as The Liquor House Soul Revue." DeMilo realized she could still sing. So, when Davison suggested revising their 1980s the soul review, DeMilo agreed. The group came back as DeMilo With Arms and played several shows in the Raleigh area starting in January 2003. Except for their two backup vocalists, all of the Soul Mates returned to play in DeMilo With Arms.

== 2016–present ==
The Fabulous Knobs decided to reform In 2016. According to Anderson, Debra said, "Why don't we do this?", and he replied "Yeah. Before we die". The Fabulous Knobs, less Enloe, played their first show in 27 years at the Groove in the Garden Festival at Raleigh Little Theater on August 13, 2016. Other occasional shows followed, including New Year's Eve at The Pour House Music Hall in Raleigh where they were joined on stage with Terry McInturff (DeMilo With Arms) Bob Passerelli, and Bob Wallace.

Cornell released his first solo album, One in Wins, on Doublenaught Records in 2021, with original songs written by Cornell, Anderson, and Taylor. Former bandmates DeMilo, Anderson, and Taylor played on the recording, along with Slakemate Abernethy and O.A.K. Team members Bartholomew and Rice.

In May 2018, The Fabulous Knobs confirmed on Instagram the band was back in the studio, recording their new album to be released by end of 2018. The album will consist entirely of new material, while having the spirit and familiar signature sound of The Fabulous Knobs. However, as of January 2022, the album has yet to release.

== Social activism ==
In 2016, The Fabulous Knobs were one of the bands who raised their voice against North Carolina House Bill 2, the Public Facilities Privacy & Security Act, helping to raise funds to help support LGBT advocacy group EqualityNC's fight against the discriminatory law. Previously, the Knobs participated in benefits for the N.C. Symphony and the Columbia Ballet.

== Discography ==
- Next Big Thing EP (1980)
- The Fabulous Knobs EP (1981)
- Hugs and Kisses (1981)
