= Buffalo Nickel (album) =

Studio album by Dan Baird
- Released: 1996
- Recorded: 1995
- Label: American
- Producer: Brendan O'Brien

Dan Baird chronology
Love Songs for the Hearing Impaired (1992)	Buffalo Nickel (1996)	Redneck Savant (2001)

Buffalo Nickel is an album by the American musician Dan Baird, released in 1996. The first single was "Younger Face". Baird supported the album with a North American tour.

== Production ==
The album was produced by Brendan O'Brien, who also played guitar. Baird cowrote or wrote nine of the songs; he ignored musical trends when forming the songs. Two songs were written by Terry Anderson, Baird's bandmate in the Yayhoos. Georgia Satellite Mauro Magellan played drums. "Hush" is a cover of the song made famous by Deep Purple, with backing vocals by Joe South. "I Want You Bad" is a cover of the NRBQ song. "Cumberland River" and "Younger Face" are about washed-up characters. "Hell to Pay" is about a friend who destroys his life. The album contains a hidden track about a Tennessee state park.

== Critical reception ==
Professional ratings
Review scores
Source	Rating
AllMusic	3/5 stars
Audio	A
Calgary Herald	3.5/5 stars
Chicago Tribune	3.5/4 stars
The Indianapolis Star	2.5/4 stars
Los Angeles Times	2/4 stars
MusicHound Rock: The Essential Album Guide	3/5 stars
Orlando Sentinel	4/5 stars

The Atlanta Journal-Constitution wrote that "Dan Baird plays guitar like the cockiest rooster stalking the walk and sings like a Faces-era Rod Stewart weaned on stock car races and homemade sin." The Denver Post determined that Baird "is making the kind of footstomping, rude, seat-of-the-pants rock 'n' roll you hardly hear anymore." The New York Times concluded that, "in an era of grunge power chords, he's dedicated to twangy, down-home, cowbell-socking rockers steeped in Chuck Berry and the Rolling Stones." The Los Angeles Times deemed the album "not profound, exactly, but a sloppy good time."

Stereo Review noted that "Baird's an old-school rocker who kicks the blues and boogie around with a salty wit underscored by a love of the sweaty, footstompin' fun that can be had when guitars, bass, and drums fall into the lockstep of Faces and Humble Pie by way of Sun and StaxVolt." The Toronto Star stated that "Baird remains one of southern rock's finest writers of toe-tapping tunes and dispensers of home truths." The Austin American-Statesman opined that O'Brien "seems obsessed with trying to keep the careers of former Georgia Satellites alive ... [he] only helps point out why the Satellites were one-hit wonders."

AllMusic wrote that "Baird's approach is so basic it borders on the generic, except when he comes up with striking lyrics to supplement the simple sound."

== Track listing ==
No.	Title	Length
1.	"Younger Face"
2.	"Cumberland River"
3.	"I Want You Bad"
4.	"On My Way"
5.	"L'il Bit"
6.	"Hell to Pay"
7.	"Woke Up Jake"
8.	"Birthday"
9.	"Hush"
10.	"Trivial as the Truth"
11.	"Hit Me Like a Train"
