= 24 Hours a Day (album) =

Studio album by the Bottle Rockets
- Released: August 12, 1997
- Genre: Rock, country rock
- Label: Atlantic
- Producer: Eric "Roscoe" Ambel

The Bottle Rockets chronology
The Brooklyn Side (1994)	24 Hours a Day (1997)	Leftovers (1998)

24 Hours a Day is the third album by the American band the Bottle Rockets, released on August 12, 1997. The band supported the album by touring with John Fogerty and then Todd Snider. Bass player Tom V. Ray left the band around the time of the album's release.

It was the band's only album for Atlantic Records, and was underpromoted, according to the Bottle Rockets. Frontman Brian Henneman also blamed the "alternative country" label that sometimes stuck to the band for the lack of rock radio airplay.

== Production ==
Recorded in Bloomington, Indiana, the album was produced by Eric "Roscoe" Ambel. Its release was delayed almost a year due to label reorganization. The passage of time is a recurring motif of the album; inspired by '70s albums, the band tried to give their songs thematic links. Henneman's songwriting was also influenced by the "rednecks" he grew up with. "Slo Toms" is about a bar in Missouri. "Perfect Far Away" is about attending a Dolly Parton concert. "Indianapolis" is about the band being stuck in the capital city due to a broken fuel pump. "Waitin' On a Train" is narrated by a man reflecting on his first marriage and family. Additional songs from the recordings sessions were released on 1998's Leftovers.

== Critical reception ==
Professional ratings
Review scores
Source	Rating
AllMusic	3.5/5 stars
Chicago Tribune	3/4 stars
Robert Christgau	A−
Lincoln Journal Star	4.5/5 stars
Orlando Sentinel	4/5 stars
(The New) Rolling Stone Album Guide	4/5 stars

The St. Louis Post Dispatch wrote that "unless you've got a high tolerance for pseudo-redneck hokum, the stuff's bound to leave you cold." The San Diego Union-Tribune noted that, "by making great, straightforward rock 'n' roll, the Bottle Rockets have created some of the best crying-in-your-beer music of the year." Robert Christgau determined that, "like Wilco, only not so generically or formalistically, this is a rock band... They love Lynyrd Skynyrd; they love the Ramones." The New York Times stated that "rock songwriters don't get any more plainspoken than Brian Henneman."

The Lincoln Journal Star concluded that the band "gets slapped with the country tag because Brian Henneman is the '90s musical poet of the common man, turning songs about the kitchen clock into meditations on time and using details to spin funny insightful songs about real people." The Rocky Mountain News advised to consider the music "working-class, Midwestern rock that taps into the same vein that John Mellencamp once did when he went by John Cougar." The Chicago Tribune praised the "greasy-gas-station firepower." The Dallas Morning News labeled 24 Hours a Day "a bona fide masterpiece."

AllMusic wrote that "much of it is simply solid, craftsmanlike country-rock that sounds like it could have been done by any alt-country band."

== Track listing ==
No.	Title	Length
1.	"Kit Kat Clock"
2.	"When I Was Dumb"
3.	"24 Hours a Day"
4.	"Smokin' 100's Alone"
5.	"Slo Toms"
6.	"Indianapolis"
7.	"Things You Didn't Know"
8.	"One of You"
9.	"Perfect Far Away"
10.	"Waitin' On a Train"
11.	"Dohack Joe"
12.	"Rich Man"
13.	"Turn for the Worse"
