= Open All Night (Georgia Satellites album) =

Studio album by the Georgia Satellites
- Released: June 1988
- Genres: Southern rock; roots rock
- Label: Elektra
- Producer: Jeff Glixman

The Georgia Satellites chronology
Georgia Satellites (1986)	Open All Night (1988)	In the Land of Salvation and Sin (1989)

Open All Night is the second album by the American band the Georgia Satellites, released in June 1988.

The band promoted the album by opening for Robert Plant on a North American tour. Open All Night peaked at No. 77 on the Billboard 200.

== Production ==
The album was produced by Jeff Glixman. Frontman Dan Baird penned "Dunk 'n' Dine" on the same day that he wrote the band's biggest hit, "Keep Your Hands to Yourself". Ian McLagan played piano on three of the album's tracks. "Don't Pass Me By" is a cover of the Beatles song.

== Critical reception ==
Professional ratings
Review scores
Source	Rating
AllMusic	3.5/5 stars
Robert Christgau	B+
The Encyclopedia of Popular Music	3/5 stars
The Philadelphia Inquirer	3/4 stars
The Rolling Stone Album Guide	3.5/5 stars

Robert Christgau concluded that "they'd like to be the Stones, but they're smart enough to know they won't make it and young enough to take their fun where they can get it." The St. Petersburg Times thought that, "although lead singer Baird's original songs are blatantly derivative, he usually adds enough colorful, good ol' boy slang and roadside imagery to turn basic, three-chord bashers into inventive Southern rock updates, evoking a more-authentic sense of roots than most of his Midwest peers." The Gazette wrote that "the Satellites end up beating hell out of anything they play, in the style of a former cover band that was too good to remain merely a cover band."

The Philadelphia Inquirer determined that "the obvious low point is a version of Jerry Lee Lewis' 'Whole Lotta Shakin''—you'd think this band would be smart enough to know that some performances can't be topped." The Ottawa Citizen noted that Open All Night "is not so much a progression from the band's debut album as it is a response to the challenge of maintaining the raw spirit that accounted for its success." The Omaha World-Herald deemed it "a rehash of the sounds from the band's popular debut effort."

AllMusic wrote that, "if this recording had been issued in another era, it would have been truly appreciated for what it was: a solid and punchy, loud and proud rock & roll album." The Rolling Stone Album Guide opined that "Baird puts across his randy tales with verve and a beguiling humility."

== Track listing ==
All tracks are written by Dan Baird, except where noted.

No.	Title	Writer(s)	Length
1.	"Open All Night"		2:51
2.	"Sheila"	Dan Baird, Neill Bogan	3:38
3.	"Whole Lotta Shakin'"	David Curlee Williams	2:30
4.	"Cool Inside"		2:56
5.	"Don't Pass Me By"	Richard Starkey	4:48
6.	"My Baby"		4:07
7.	"Mon Cheri"		4:37
8.	"Down and Down"		3:48
9.	"Dunk 'n' Dine"	Baird, David Michaelson	2:28
10.	"Baby So Fine"		3:36
11.	"Hand to Mouth"		4:49
Total length:			40:18
