= Brand New Year (The Bottle Rockets album) =

Studio album by the Bottle Rockets
- Released: August 10, 1999
- Genre: Rock
- Label: Doolittle/Mercury
- Producer: Eric "Roscoe" Ambel

The Bottle Rockets chronology
| Leftovers (1998) | Brand New Year (1999) | Songs of Sahm (2002) |

Brand New Year is an album by the American band the Bottle Rockets, released on August 10, 1999. The first single was "Nancy Sinatra". The band supported the album with a North American tour.

== Production ==
After leaving Atlantic Records, the Bottle Rockets decided to focus on recording a rock album, concluding that their recent rock songs were stronger than their country ones. Brand New Year was produced by Eric "Roscoe" Ambel. Many its songs were inspired by people and stories from the band's hometown of Festus, Missouri. Bass player Robert Kearns joined the band prior to the recording sessions. The band and Ambel listened to Shania Twain's Come On Over during the sessions and decorated the studio with Twain posters and artwork; frontman Brian Henneman thought that the band was the loosest it had been in a studio. The title track appears in two versions, one electric and one acoustic; Henneman half-jokingly likened it to a "Hey Hey, My My" effort, saying that it was an attempt to give thematic weight to the album. "Gotta Get Up" is about the unchanging daily grind of work. "Headed for the Ditch" alludes to Neil Young's Decade liner notes. "White Boy Blues" is about old guitars that are so expensive that only very wealthy consumers can afford them.

== Critical reception ==
Professional ratings
Review scores
| Source | Rating |
|---|---|
| AllMusic | 3/5 stars |
| Chicago Sun-Times | 3.5/4 stars |
| Robert Christgau | (3-star Honorable Mention) |
| Lincoln Journal Star | 5/5 stars |
| (The New) Rolling Stone Record Guide | 3/5 stars |
| Spin | 6/10 |
| The Virgin Encyclopedia of Nineties Music | 3/5 stars |

The Chicago Tribune called the Bottle Rockets "the thinking person's hillbilly bar band". The Village Voice said that the band uses "foursquare riffs and dual-lead lines to kick up some boogie dust in their wake-kinda like Georgia Satellites, but with real grime under their fingernails." Stereo Review concluded, "When a roots-rock band's songs start wearing hangdog expressions, the sense of unbridled fun that is the genre's calling card is lost." Spin noted that "it's easy to mistake the Bottle Rockets for a musical goof."

The Independent said that "one of America's very best bar bands return with a darker, denser and generally louder disc, with their biting humour intact." Robert Christgau praised "Headed for the Ditch" and "Gotta Get Up". The Lincoln Journal Star called the Bottle Rockets "America's last great rock 'n' roll band." The Chicago Sun-Times labeled the album the band's "grungiest set of bar rock yet". The Santa Fe New Mexican included Brand New Year on its list of the 20 best albums of 1999.

== Track listing ==
| No. | Title | Length |
|---|---|---|
| 1. | "Nancy Sinatra" |
| 2. | "Alone in Bad Company" |
| 3. | "I've Been Dying" |
| 4. | "Sometimes Found" |
| 5. | "Headed for the Ditch" |
| 6. | "Helpless" |
| 7. | "Let Me Know" |
| 8. | "Brand New Year" |
| 9. | "Dead Dog Memories" |
| 10. | "The Bar's on Fire" |
| 11. | "White Boy Blues" |
| 12. | "Gotta Get Up" |
| 13. | "Love Like a Truck" |
| 14. | "Another Brand New Year" |
