= Lincoln Journal (disambiguation) =

Lincoln Journal was a daily afternoon newspaper that merged with the Lincoln Star in 1995 to form the Lincoln Journal Star.

Lincoln Journal may also refer to:

- Lincoln Journal (Lincoln, Massachusetts), defunct newspaper in Lincoln, Massachusetts
