= Sandhills Community College =

College in Pinehurst, North Carolina, U.S.

- Motto: Learn • Engage • Belong
- Type: Public community college
- Established: 1963
- Parent institution: North Carolina Community College System
- President: Alexander Stewart
- Students: 4000 curriculum students
- Location: Pinehurst, North Carolina, U.S. 35.2211°N 79.4077°W
- Campus: Small town
- Colors: Burgundy, black, gray
- Nickname: The Flyers
- Sporting affiliations: NJCAA Division III
- Mascot: Marty McFlyer
- Website: www.sandhills.edu

Sandhills Community College is a public community college in Pinehurst, North Carolina. Sandhills was chartered in 1963 and officially opened October 1, 1965. It was the first comprehensive community college authorized and established as the result of legislation passed by the 1963 General Assembly of North Carolina. It is part of the North Carolina Community College System. Sandhills Community College has about 4,000 students enrolled in college-credit curriculum courses and over 11,000 students who take continuing-education courses annually.

== History ==
Shortly after the passage of legislation establishing Sandhills Community College, H. Clifton Blue of Aberdeen, NC, led a group of prominent Moore County, NC, citizens in petitioning the State Board of Education to establish a community college in Moore County. Upon approval of the petition, the citizens of Moore County voted in favor of a $1 million bond issue for capital construction and a tax levy for the maintenance of college facilities.

The first board of trustees meeting occurred on December 4, 1963. On December 27, Raymond Stone was named the first president of the college. Sandhills was chartered in 1963.

The buildings were designed by local architects Hayes-Howell and Associates, and built on 180 acres donated by Mrs. Mary Luman Meyer. The groundbreaking was in November 1964. Legend has it that Stone and a few others were having lunch at The Gray Fox in downtown Pinehurst and Stone admired the courtyard of the restaurant (now Theo's Taverna). He requested courtyards be implemented into the design of the college buildings. The palladium windows were said to be inspired by the Boyd House in downtown Southern Pines.

Sandhills Community College officially opened October 1, 1965, with classes being held in nine different temporary locations in the downtown area of Southern Pines. The administrative offices were above Patches Department Store, which is now The Ice Cream Parlor. The college moved to the current location in September 1966.

John Dempsey assumed the presidency in 1989 and served until December 2022. On July 1, 2023, Alexander “Sandy” Stewart became the college’s third president.

== Administration ==
A board of trustees governs the college and is composed of appointees by the governor, the Moore County Board of Commissioners, and the Moore County Board of Education.

== Academics ==
In addition to the university studies college transfer program, Sandhills Community College offers 34 two-year Associate in Applied Science degrees (AAS). Certain programs offer 2+2 transferable agreements with several four-year institutions. Degrees from Sandhills are accredited by the Southern Association of Colleges and Schools.

=== SandHoke Early College High School ===
SandHoke Early College High School is a partnership between the Hoke County School System and Sandhills Community College. At the conclusion of the five-year plan of study, graduates receive a high-school diploma from Hoke County schools and an associate of arts degree from Sandhills Community College. "The mission of SandHoke Early College High School is to provide a smaller, more personalized learning community that will prepare all students for a challenging program of study by developing academic rigor, providing relevant coursework, and building student/community relationships." In addition to completing courses required by Hoke County Schools for the high school diploma, students will also complete the required plan of study for the Associate in Arts degree.

Admission to SandHoke Early College High School begins when Hoke County middle school students are in the eighth grade. Students and their parents complete an application form with Hoke County Schools.

== Athletics ==
The college revived its athletic program in 2009. It comprises men's and women's golf teams, a women's volleyball team, and a men's basketball team. Competition is through Region X of the NJCAA. The teams are called the "Flyers".

== Notable alumni ==
- Terry Anderson, songwriter and musician
  - The Fabulous Knobs, rock band consisting of alumni Terry Anderson, Jack Cornell, David Enloe, and Debra DeMilo
- Matt Hardy, professional wrestler
