= Blue Sky (Bottle Rockets album) =

Studio album by the Bottle Rockets
- Released: October 28, 2003
- Recorded: April 2003
- Studio: Walter, Hoboken
- Genre: Rock, roots rock
- Label: Sanctuary
- Producer: Warren Haynes, Michael Barbiero, the Bottle Rockets

The Bottle Rockets chronology
Songs of Sahm (2002)	Blue Sky (2003)	Zoysia (2006)

Blue Sky is an album by the American band the Bottle Rockets, released on October 28, 2003. They supported it with a North American tour.

== Production ==
Recorded in April 2003 at Walter Music Studios in Hoboken, New Jersey, the album was produced by Warren Haynes, Michael Barbiero, and the band. It was recorded as a trio, following the departure of guitarist Tom Parr. Mark Spencer contributed on guitar. Frontman Brian Henneman thought that Blue Sky was a more mature album, noting that the bandmembers were older and that some were in solid, sober relationships. "Baggage Claim" is about how romantic partners need to reunite at the baggage claim rather than at the terminal gate due to the September 11, 2001, attacks. "Man of Constant Anxiety" lampoons the song "Man of Constant Sorrow" by describing the lives of the working poor rather than embracing folk nostalgia. "Baby's Not My Baby Tonight" is about a couple attempting to move past relationship problems. "Lucky Break" is about making the best of a workplace injury.

== Critical reception ==
Professional ratings
Review scores
Source	Rating
AllMusic	3.5/5 stars
Robert Christgau	A−
The Gazette	2.5/5 stars
Lincoln Journal Star	4/5 stars
Pitchfork	3.0/10
(The New) Rolling Stone Album Guide	2/5 stars
USA Today	2.5/4 stars

The Hartford Courant noted that "Henneman always added a few touching numbers to previous albums, but here they're more dominant as the standard barroom ditties fall into the background." The Lincoln Journal Star called Henneman "a poet of the working man, an observant writer who gets at real people's lives with a bit of humor and lots of soul". The New York Times said that the Bottle Rockets "play gruff, straightforward roots-rock songs that measure small triumphs and inevitable disappointments." Pitchfork labeled the album "their bleakest and most humbled record to date".

USA Today concluded that "four years of songwriting time should have produced more consistent material." The Village Voice said that Henneman "has brought brains, chops, and firsthand experience to provocative songs of working-class men and women, semi-rural division, for 10 years now." The Gazette concluded that "in avoiding the mythic in favor of the quotidian ... they become quite everyday... Best experienced live." The Chicago Tribune stated that on the first half of Blue Sky "the Rockets play pop-oriented material that resembles rewrites of Tom Petty and Warren Zevon songs". Robert Christgau wrote, "The Drive-By Truckers having jumped the Bottle Rockets' claim as the social-realist Lynyrd Skynyrd ... Warren Haynes avoids a dick-size contest by accentuating their strength—Brian Henneman's Midwestern declarative."

== Track listing ==
No.	Title	Length
1.	"Lucky Break"
2.	"Man of Constant Anxiety"
3.	"I Don't Wanna Go Back"
4.	"Baggage Claim"
5.	"Men & Women"
6.	"Baby's Not My Baby Tonight"
7.	"Cartoon Wisdom"
8.	"Cross by the Highway"
9.	"Pretty Little Angie"
10.	"Blue Sky"
11.	"Mom & Dad"
12.	"I.D. Blues"
13.	"The Last Time"
