= The Western Sizzlers =

American rock band

The Western Sizzlers are an American rock band established in 2013 by ex Georgia Satellites manager Kevin Jennings and guitarist/singer of the Satellites, Rick Richards.

Jennings, along with Richards, enlisted the talents of Charlie Starr of Blackberry Smoke on guitar and vocals along with Steve Marriott's son Toby Marriott and Nicky Ford on guitars. Drummers in the band were Larue Riccio, Wayne Glass, and Kevin "Snit" Fitzpatrick. Jeff Bakos recorded and engineered their first album, "For Ol' Times Sake", which was released in May 2013 on the Roar Hide label; he also played bass on all tracks.

Jennings subsequently secured a European deal with Proper Distribution (the UK's largest independent record distributor), and was added to JCPL Agency & Label UK's roster of acts. Sharing the roster with the likes of Dan Baird and Homemade Sin, Mott the Hoople, Mick Ralphs, the Bluefields, Ian Hunter, and the Del-Lords. In 2013, the Sizzlers, in support of their debut album, toured Europe with the Del-Lords and again in 2014 with Bad Company and Mott the Hoople guitarist Mick Ralphs.

With the 2014 addition of new drummer Michael "Mikey Von Hammer" Wray, the band's second album 1-4-5-Go was released on 15 August 2016.

== Links ==
- http://sonicshocks.tumblr.com/post/57558044032/review-the-western-sizzlers-for-ol-times-sake
- http://classicrock.teamrock.com/reviews/2013-06-19/the-western-sizzlers-for-ol-times-sake
- http://www.jcplmusic.com/category/agency-roster/
- http://www.propermusic.com/search?term=the+Western+Sizzlers&filterOption=all
