= The Brooklyn Side =

Album by The Bottle Rockets

Studio album by the Bottle Rockets
- Released: 1994
- Genre: Roots rock
- Length: 51:59
- Labels: East Side Digital; TAG; Atlantic
- Producer: Eric Ambel

The Bottle Rockets chronology
Bottle Rockets (1993)	The Brooklyn Side (1994)	24 Hours a Day (1997)

The Brooklyn Side is the second studio album by St. Louis, Missouri-based roots rock band the Bottle Rockets. It was released on East Side Digital in 1994, and was produced by Eric Ambel. It soon received many favorable reviews from critics, which prompted Atlantic Records to sign the band to their roster, after which they reissued the album in 1995.

== Critical reception ==
Professional ratings
Review scores
Source	Rating
AllMusic	4.5/5 stars
The Austin Chronicle	4/5 stars
Entertainment Weekly	A
Orlando Sentinel	4/5 stars
Q	4/5 stars
Rolling Stone	4/5 stars
The Rolling Stone Album Guide	4/5 stars
The Village Voice	A−

The Brooklyn Side placed at number 35 on The Village Voice's year-end Pazz & Jop critics' poll.

== Track listing ==
No.	Title	Length
1.	"Welfare Music"	3:18
2.	"Gravity Fails"	3:21
3.	"I'll Be Comin' Around"	2:43
4.	"Radar Gun"	3:15
5.	"Sunday Sports"	4:59
6.	"Pot of Gold"	3:28
7.	"1000 Dollar Car"	4:46
8.	"Idiot's Revenge"	3:45
9.	"Young Lovers in Town"	3:33
10.	"Take Me to the Bank"	2:37
11.	"What More Can I Do?"	4:23
12.	"Stuck in a Rut"	4:45
13.	"I Wanna Come Home"	3:12
14.	"Queen of the World"	3:54
Total length:		51:59

== 2013 reissue with Bottle Rockets ==
Bottle Rockets/The Brooklyn Side

Compilation album by The Bottle Rockets
- Released: November 19, 2013
- Genre: Roots rock
- Length: 2:25:34
- Label: Bloodshot

On November 19, 2013, Bloodshot Records reissued a remastered version of both The Brooklyn Side and the band's previous album, 1993's Bottle Rockets. This reissue also included live and demo versions of some of the albums' songs.

2013 reissue
Aggregate scores
Source	Rating
Metacritic	89/100
Review scores
Source	Rating
AllMusic	4.5/5 stars
American Songwriter	4/5 stars
Blurt	4/5 stars
Chicago Tribune	4/4 stars
Exclaim!	9/10
The Guardian	4/5 stars
PopMatters	8/10
Uncut	9/10
