= The Yayhoos =

American country rock band

- Genres: Rock and roll; Alternative Country; Country Rock
- Years active: 1995–present
- Members: Eric "Rosco" Ambel; Terry Anderson; Dan Baird; Keith Christopher
- Website: yayhoos.com

The Yayhoos are an American country rock group led by Eric "Rosco" Ambel (Joan Jett & The Blackhearts) with Dan Baird (The Georgia Satellites). They were called "the Traveling Wilbury's of Now Americana" and "the rig-rock supergroup from heck".

== Background ==
The Yayhoos formed as a "temporary band" in 1993 and consisted of "an all-star lineout of country punk veterans," including Eric "Rosco" Ambel on guitar/vocals, Dan Baird on guitar/vocals, Keith Christopher on bass, and Terry Anderson on drums/vocals. With three solo artists from singer-songwriter backgrounds—Anderson, Ambel, and Baird—the band features three lead vocalists as well as three songwriters.

=== Members ===
Eric "Rosco" Ambel was a founding member of both Joan Jett & The Blackhearts and The Del-Lords. He has released three solo albums and played with his band Roscoe's Gang and Rosco's Trio. He has produced several records for The Bottle Rockets, Blood Oranges and other Americana and rock and roll bands. Ambel toured and recorded as the guitarist for Steve Earle & the Dukes from 2000 to 2005, appearing on two studio and two live albums, including Earle's 2005 Grammy Award-winning album The Revolution Starts Now. Ambel owns Cowboy Technical Services Recording Studio and The Lakeside Lounge in New York City.

Terry Anderson played in The Woodpeckers with Baird, The Fabulous Knobs, The Woods, and Terry Anderson and the Olympic Ass Kickin' Team. He also toured with Don Dixon and Marti Jones. Anderson songs have been recorded by Etta James, Jo Dee Messina, Tim McGraw, Volbeat, and others. He wrote songs recorded by both The Georgia Satellites and Dan Baird, including the hits "Battleship Chains" and "I Love You Period".

Dan Baird was the frontman of The Georgia Satellites and is also a solo recording artist. He has been a producer and guitarist with several other bands, including of Will Hoge and Chris Knight and the Dusters. His current band, Homemade Sin, includes Warner E. Hodges and former Satellite Mauro Magellan.

Keith Christopher was an original member of The Georgia Satellites and played on both of Baird's solo albums. He has also played Billy Joe Shaver, Tony Joe White, Todd Snider, Paul Westerberg, Aaron Lee Tasjan, and Kenny Wayne Shepherd.

=== History ===
When Anderson's band The Fabulous Knobs broke–up, Baird's band The Georgia Satellites did not have a recording contract. In 1984, the two became part of a new band out of Raleigh, North Carolina called the Woodpeckers. Even though the Woodpeckers only lasted for one year—Baird left when The Georgia Satellites were signed by a label—Baird and Anderson continued to collaborate on songwriting and have played together on and off.

After the breakup of The Woods (the name of the Woodpeckers without Baird) in 1993, Anderson recorded a solo album, You Don't Like Me. Ambel, like Anderson, also had a new solo album, Loud & Lonesome. Baird had one solo album and was working on another. Amber said, "All of our paths have been crossing since the 1980s. We all got together round [1993] to write songs for our solo careers. Then we thought it might be a good idea if we all went out on the road together to promote our solo records at the same time." Anderson noted, "It's one band trying to sell three records." Add Christopher and the result was the "temporary" band The Yayhoos. The name was Anderson and Baird's spin on the chocolate drink YooHoo.

In 1995, The Yahoos toured the South with Dillon Fence and headliners Drivin N Cryin, playing their individual greatest hits with a sprinkle of new material from their solo projects. The Yayhoos then set out on their own tour across the United States and Europe. For some shows, they were billed as Dan Baird and The Yayhoos. However, this tour was not arena shows, but rather smaller bars. In addition, The Yayhoos themselves appeared somewhat relaxed—one reviewer noted, "The band played up the sloppy drunk angle at the Mercury Lounge…with the three front men following the lead of noticeably intoxicated Christopher." However, Baird said, "That's what a rock–and–rock show should be. We just follow the outline as best we can and let Keith take us over the cliff."

Around 1996, the band gathered in a barn owned by Anderson's father and began writing songs. Those songs were later recorded as demos for Almo Records using just six microphones and an eight-track console. When Dan Baird released his second solo album, Buffalo Nickel in 1996, he included a hidden 12th track, "Frozen Head State Park," from The Yayhoos' recording sessions. The rest of The Yayhoo's songs "sat on a shelf for nearly five years."

However, the demo tracks were circulated amongst friends bringing the band to the attention of the independent label Bloodshot Record who wanted to release an album. The result was Fear Not the Obvious( 2001), but the band's ability to tour in support of this album was limited by the member's schedules with other acts and the events of 9/11. Ultimately, The Yahoos played 13 shows in 16 days in support of Fear Not the Obvious.

In 2006, The Yayhoos spent three holiday weekends in Ambel’s Cowboy Technical Services Recording Studio working on a new album. Released on Ambel's DIY label Lakeside Lounge Records in 2006, the resulting album, Put the Hammer Down, is a mix of original songs with a few covers.

Ultimately, The Yayhoos have been challenged to find time to play together, given their busy and diverse schedules with other groups. In addition, their formula of three singers did not find its audience or a major label.

=== The Return ===
In 2017, The Yayhoos announced their first tour in ten years, dubbed the Test the Water Tour, with two weeks in the U.S. and a month in Europe. However, the tour was canceled because Baird was undergoing treatment for leukemia. In 2020, The Yayhoos were selected to participate in the 5th Outlaw Country Cruise.

== Discography ==
- 2001: Fear Not The Obvious (Bloodshot Records)
- 2006: Put The Hammer Down (Lakeside Lounge Records)
