= It's All Over but the Crying =

It's All Over but the Crying may refer to:

- "It's All Over but the Crying", a 1947 song by The Ink Spots
- "All Over But the Cryin'", a song by The Georgia Satellites from their 1989 album In the Land of Salvation and Sin
- "It's All Over but the Crying", a song by Garbage from their 2005 album Bleed Like Me
