= In the Land of Salvation and Sin =

Studio album by The Georgia Satellites
- Released: October 1989
- Genre: Southern rock
- Length: 55:32
- Label: Elektra
- Producer: Joe Hardy; The Georgia Satellites

The Georgia Satellites chronology
Open All Night (1988)	In the Land of Salvation and Sin (1989)	Shaken Not Stirred (1996)

In the Land of Salvation and Sin is the third studio album by U.S. southern-rock band The Georgia Satellites, released in 1989 on Elektra Records. It was produced by Joe Hardy, who had previously produced recordings by ZZ Top and Steve Earle, and who was known for his traditional style. AllMusic's Thom Jurek gave the album 3 out of 5 stars, describing it as "...the band's most consistent and innovative recording." As of 2022, this is the most recent studio album to contain original material by The Georgia Satellites, although they did record eight new songs on their next album Shaken Not Stirred (1996).

Professional ratings
Review scores
Source	Rating
AllMusic	3/5 stars
Chicago Tribune	3/4 stars
Orlando Sentinel	4/5 stars
The Rolling Stone Album Guide	3.5/5 stars
The Village Voice	C+

== Track listing ==
All songs written by Dan Baird except as indicated.

1. "I Dunno" – 3:10
2. "Bottle O' Tears" – 3:52
3. "All Over But The Cryin'" – 5:11
4. "Shake That Thing" – 5:12
5. "Six Years Gone" – 3:09
6. "Games People Play" (Joe South) – 3:40
7. "Another Chance" – 4:33
8. "Bring Down the Hammer" – 4:23
9. "Slaughterhouse" (Rick Richards) – 2:47
10. "Stellazine Blues" – 4:11
11. "Sweet Blue Midnight" – 6:26
12. "Days Gone By" – 3:34
13. "Crazy" (Baird, Gina Webb) – 3:24
14. "Dan Takes Five" – 3:24

== Personnel ==
- Dan Baird – vocals, guitar, dobro, piano, percussion
- Rick Richards – lead and 12-string guitar, vocals
- Rick Price – bass, mandolin, bouzouki, vocals
- Mauro Magellan – drums, percussion, acoustic bass, vocals
- Ian McLagan – piano, organ
- Nicolette Larson – vocals
- Steve Winstead – gang vocals
- Kevin Jennings – gang vocals, harmonica
