= The Brain of the Dog in Section =

Live album by Peter Brötzmann and Fred Lonberg-Holm
- Released: 2008
- Recorded: November 28, 2007
- Venue: The Hideout, Chicago
- Genre: Free improvisation
- Length: 37:53
- Label: Atavistic; ALP186CD

Peter Brötzmann chronology
At Molde 2007 (2008)	The Brain of the Dog in Section (2008)	In Amherst 2006 (2008)

The Brain of the Dog in Section is a live album by saxophonist Peter Brötzmann and cellist and electronic musician Fred Lonberg-Holm. It was recorded on November 28, 2007, at the Hideout in Chicago, and was released in 2008 by Atavistic Records.

Regarding the experience of performing with Brötzmann, Lonberg-Holm remarked: "there is no playing around the edges, no sizing each other up. There will be no teeny little sounds. It's like, 'Here I am. This is me.' And from there, we work through the music. After we throw down our hands, the negotiations get started and we get into some areas that only the two of us can get into."

== Reception ==
Professional ratings
Review scores
Source	Rating
AllMusic	3.5/5 stars
Tom Hull – on the Web	B+

In a review for AllMusic, Thom Jurek stated that the musicians make "an excellent case for showcasing the importance of listening in free improvisation," and acknowledged the "wealth of sonic textures and dynamics" on the album. He wrote: "The sparks on this set fly fast, but never loose. This is a deeply focused affair that gives listeners the best of both players on display at full-bore."

Ted Gordon of All About Jazz described the album as "a solid expression, a sonically interesting meeting of musical voices, a simple, graceful exhalation," and commented: "This is healthy music—the sounds of vim and vigor, the exhaust of physical, musical and mental exertion... Like attending a Bikhram yoga session of the will and the mind... the music... is full of health, a spirulina-wheat grass shake spiked with kombucha and cayenne pepper."

Paris Transatlantic's Massimo Ricci remarked: "this set... is so jam-packed with slicing shards, rusty spikes and Tasmanian Devil whirls-and-sputters that any attempt at description is doomed to failure... These artists may have become known quantities in the world of improvisation, but their encounter here offers previously overlooked facets of their musical personalities with every listen."

Writing for JazzWord, Ken Waxman noted that Brötzmann's "reed command is so entrenched that his range overwhelms even if the textures exposed can resemble the death rattle of a carnivorous animal or the warning cries of a carrion-seeking bird of prey," and stated that "Lonberg-Holm's harsh oscillations, ring modulator-suggested vamps and agitated sul ponticello flanges are perfect in this context, since they set up abrasive counterpoint to the reedist's blustering multiphonics."

A writer for the Downtown Music Gallery commented: "Although The Brain of the Dog was recorded in an ultra-industrial urban warehouse district, the resulting music is uber-organic, almost onomatopoeic at points. Certainly, fans of Schwarzwaldfahrt, Brotzmann and Han Bennink's now classic free-jazz camping trip deep into Germany's Black Forest, are strongly urged to check into this seminal blast!"

== Track listing ==
1. "Section 1" – 13:52
2. "Section 2" – 19:39
3. "Section 3" – 4:22

== Personnel ==
- Peter Brötzmann – tenor saxophone, alto saxophone, B♭ clarinet, tárogató
- Fred Lonberg-Holm – cello, electronics
