= On a Carousel =

1967 song by the Hollies

- US Picture Sleeve

Single by the Hollies
- B-side: "All the World Is Love"
- Released: 10 February 1967
- Recorded: 11 and 13 January 1967
- Studio: EMI, London
- Genre: Psychedelic pop
- Length: 3:07
- Label: Parlophone (UK); Imperial (US)
- Songwriters: Graham Nash, Allan Clarke, Tony Hicks
- Producer: Ron Richards

The Hollies singles chronology
"Stop Stop Stop" (1966)	"On a Carousel" (1967)	"Carrie Anne" (1967)

"On a Carousel" is a song written by Allan Clarke, Graham Nash and Tony Hicks. It was released by the Hollies as a single in February 1967, having been recorded the previous month, on the Parlophone label in the UK and Imperial in the US. Nash would opine: "We knew it was a hit from the get-go."

== Original recording ==
Nash would recall that prior to "On a Carousel", "our biggest hits were Graham Gouldman songs ... Tony, Allan and I wanted desperately to write a monster A-side ... We thought we were good enough writers, we knew the combination, how to come up with a universal theme, the right kind of hook. So we went through a shitload of ideas until inspiration struck. I'm not sure which of the three of us came up with funfairs ... We [realized] a love affair was pretty much like going round and round and round on a carousel. And before we knew it the song just took shape. It was all there, the words, the tune, there was no stopping it. And Tony and Bobby [Elliott] wrapped it up in an exceptional arrangement."

"On a Carousel" was the Hollies first A-side on which Nash sang lead vocals; he sang the first verse alone, and shared lead vocals with Clarke for the remainder of the song. It was the Hollies' second-last single to be released in the US by Imperial before the band switched to the Epic label. The song was a hit in the UK, peaking at #4 on the single charts, and in Canada it made #7 in the RPM Magazine charts. It was also a hit in the United States, peaking at #11 on the Billboard chart.

=== Charts ===
Chart (1967)	Peak position
Australia (Go-Set)	14
Finland (Soumen Virallinen)	25
West Germany (GfK)	8
Netherlands (Single Top 100)	16
New Zealand (Listener)	3
Norway (VG-lista)	10
UK Singles (OCC)	4
US Billboard Hot 100	11

== Other versions ==
- Mike Vickers, formerly a member of Manfred Mann, recorded the song for his 1968 debut album, I Wish I Were a Group Again.
- Progressive rock band Glass Moon covered the song in 1982 on their second studio album Growing in the Dark.
- American rock duo Shaw Blades recorded a version in 2007 for their covers album Influence.
