= Eric Ambel =

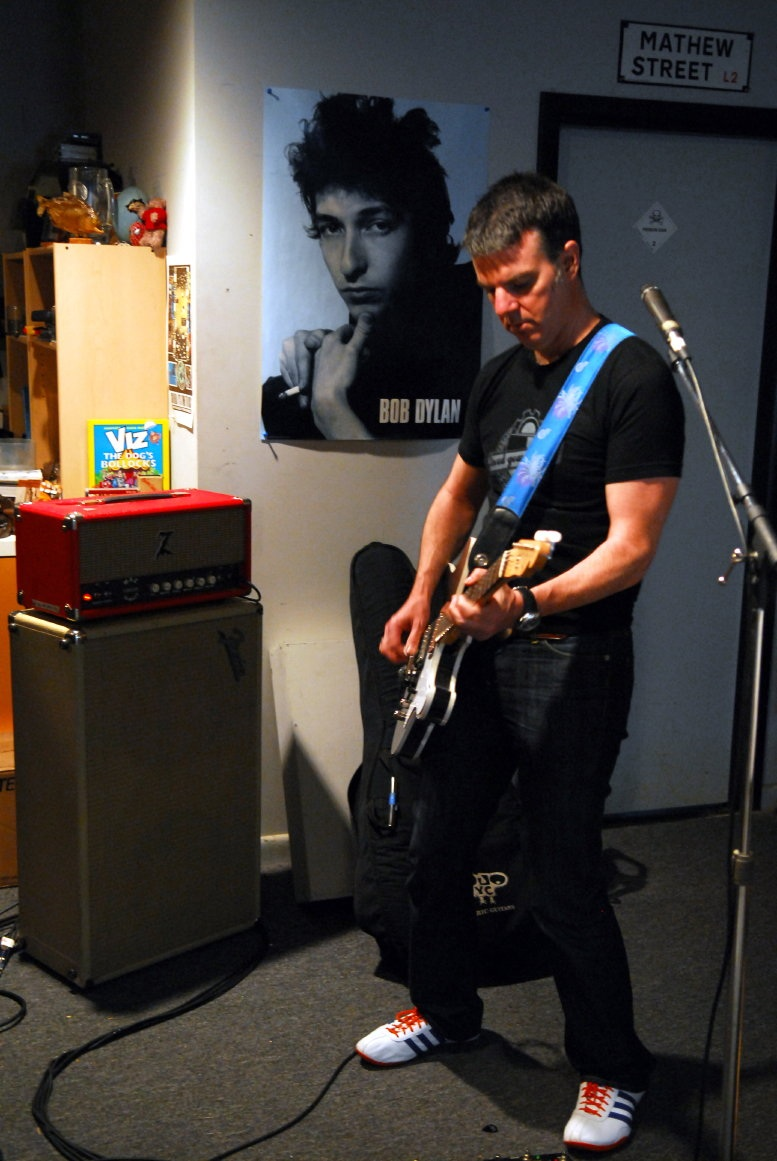

Background information
- Also known as: Eric "Roscoe" Ambel; Eric Roscoe Ambel
- Born: August 20, 1957 (age 68); Kankakee, Illinois, U.S.
- Genres: Americana; folk rock; rock; alternative country
- Occupations: Musician; record producer
- Instruments: Guitarist; multi-instrumentalist
- Years active: Late 1970s-present
- Labels: Enigma; EMI; Bloodshot
- Website: ericambel.com

Eric "Roscoe" Ambel (born August 20, 1957) is an American guitarist and record producer.

He has worked with a wide range of artists including Nils Lofgren, Steve Earle, the Yayhoos, Del Lords, The Bottle Rockets, Joan Jett, Mojo Nixon, Blood Oranges, Blue Mountain, Freedy Johnston and Mary Lee's Corvette.

== Early life and education ==
Eric "Roscoe" Ambel was born August 20, 1957, in Kankakee, Illinois, and grew up in Batavia, Illinois. He began playing music in school, taking up piano and trumpet, and attended the University of Wyoming, where he played trumpet in the marching band.

== Career ==
=== Early bands and Joan Jett ===
Ambel has credited a 1976 Ramones and Dictators concert in Chicago, which he attended on tickets won from the radio station WXRT, with drawing him toward punk rock. He formed a band called the Dirty Dogs in Laramie, Wyoming, which relocated to Los Angeles and was renamed the Accelerators. After the group disbanded, he played with Rik L Rik and with Top Jimmy.

In 1979, Ambel joined Joan Jett's backing band, the Blackhearts, as lead guitarist, and played on the album I Love Rock 'n' Roll before leaving in 1981. He then moved to New York City and became a founding member of the Del-Lords, alongside former Dictators guitarist Scott Kempner and drummer Frank Funaro. The band released four studio albums and a live album between 1984 and 1990.

=== Production work and Lakeside Lounge ===
Ambel began producing in the 1980s, recording singles for the Brooklyn truck-driving label Diesel Only Records during his time with the Del-Lords. He has cited his production of Nils Lofgren's Crooked Line (Rykodisc) as an early breakthrough. His production credits since have included albums for the Bottle Rockets, Blue Mountain, the Backsliders, Blood Oranges and Sarah Borges, among others.

The Yayhoos, a group Ambel formed with former Georgia Satellites frontman Dan Baird, bassist Keith Christopher and drummer Terry Anderson, grew out of a 1993 songwriting gathering; the group wrote and recorded its debut album in 1996, though Bloodshot Records did not release Fear Not the Obvious until 2001. In April 1996, Ambel and disc jockey James Marshall opened the East Village bar the Lakeside Lounge, which Ambel booked and co-owned until its closure in April 2012.

In 1999, Ambel and engineer Tim Hatfield established Cowboy Technical Services, a recording studio in Williamsburg, Brooklyn that later relocated to Greenpoint. The studio has hosted artists including Ryan Adams, Steve Wynn, Marshall Crenshaw, Los Lobos and Laura Cantrell.

Ambel founded Lakeside Lounge Records to release his own music. Its first release was the 2004 compilation Knucklehead, which collected previously unreleased tracks recorded over the preceding decade with collaborators including the Del-Lords, the Bottle Rockets, the Yayhoos and Steve Earle.

=== Steve Earle and later work ===
In 2000, Ambel became lead guitarist in Steve Earle's backing band, the Dukes, recording and touring with Earle through 2005. He appeared on Earle's Jerusalem, the documentary Just an American Boy and the Grammy Award-winning The Revolution Starts... Now.

The Yayhoos released a second album, Put the Hammer Down, on Lakeside Lounge Records in 2006. In 2013, Ambel reunited with the Del-Lords for the album Elvis Club. In 2016, he released Lakeside, his first solo studio album in over a decade, named for the bar he had co-owned. He continues to work as a producer and performer at Cowboy Technical Services in Brooklyn.

== Selected Production & Session Credits ==
2016	Canis Majoris	Esquela	Producer
2015	#392: The EP Collection	Marshall Crenshaw	Mixing
2015	Blue Healer	Jimbo Mathus	Primary Artist
2015	South Broadway Athletic Club	The Bottle Rockets	Mixing, Photography, Vocals, Guitars, Composer
2014	Face the Music	Nils Lofgren	Guitar, Producer, Vocals
2014	The Box Set Series	Run-D.M.C.	Guitar
2013	Bottle Rockets/The Brooklyn Side	The Bottle Rockets	Transfers, Reissue Coordination, Guest Artist, Mixing
2013	Elvis Club	The Del-Lords	Engineer, Guitar, Vocal Harmony, Soloist, Inside Photo, Composer, Keyboards, Vocals
2013	Let Me Turn You On!		Composer, Guitar, Instrumentation
2013	Are We Rolling?	Esquela	Producer
2011	Heart Of A Dog	Kasey Anderson and the Honkies	Composer
2011	Not So Loud: An Acoustic Evening	The Bottle Rockets	Mixing
2010	The Music of Run DMC	Run-D.M.C.	Guitar
2010	The Owl Has Landed	Esquela	Producer
2009	A New Beginning	Ted Morris	Mixing
2009	Lean Forward	The Bottle Rockets	Producer, Engineer, Mixing, Vocals, Guitar, Keyboards
2009	Royal City	Royal City	Engineer
2009	This Song Kills Cancer, Vol. 1		Producer
2008	Live from Austin TX November 12, 2000	Steve Earle	Main Personnel, Vocals, Guitar
2007	Brooklyn Bridge	Casey Neill	Guitar (Electric)
2007	Dismissed With a Kiss	Spanking Charlene	Producer, Photography, Guitar, Guitar (12 String Acoustic), Guitar (Electric), Wah Wah Guitar, Soloist, Dulcitone
2007	Let Go	Keri Noble	Guitar (Electric)
2007	Low	Miss Ohio	Mixing, Keyboards
2007	Reckoning	Kasey Anderson	Producer, Guitar (Acoustic), Guitar (Electric), Guitar (12 String), Guitar (Baritone), E-Bow, Trumpet, Keyboards, Tambourine, Vocals (Background), Hi String Guitar, Mando-Guitar
2007	Songbird: Rare Tracks & Forgotten Gems	Emmylou Harris	Vocals, Guitar
2006	Harpo's Ghost	Thea Gilmore	Engineer, Guitar (Electric), Harmonium
2006	In the Raw	Sugar Mountain	Producer, Mixing, Guitar (Acoustic), Pump Organ, Vocals (Background), Vocal Harmony, Fuzz Guitar, Telecaster
2006	Love, Loss & Lunacy	Mary Lee's Corvette	Producer, Guitar (12 String), Drum Programming
2006	Put the Hammer Down	The Yayhoos	Producer, Liner Notes, Vocals, Guitar, Guitar (12 String Acoustic), Guitar (Electric), Piano, Drums, Percussion, Clapping, Dulcitone, Fuzz Guitar, Group Member, Composer
2006	Slither [Music from the Motion Picture]	Allan Wilson	Composer
2006	Wire Waltz	The Last Town Chorus	Engineer
2005	Best: 1991–2003	Joe d'Urso & Stone Caravan	Producer, Musician
2005	Favorites 1990–2005	Nils Lofgren	Producer, Audio Production, Main Personnel, Vocals, Guitar, Guitar (Electric), Timpani
2005	For a Decade of Sin: 11 Years of Bloodshot Records		Producer, Mixing, Group Member
2005	Keri Noble	Keri Noble	Guitar (Electric)
2005	Lowe Profile: A Tribute to Nick Lowe		Producer, Vocals, Guitar, Bass, Primary Artist
2005	My Own Backyard	Ann Klein	Guitar (Acoustic)
2005	Terry Anderson and the Olympic Ass-Kickin Team	Terry Anderson	Guitar
2004	Austin City Limits Music Festival: 2003		Guitar
2004	Dead Roses	Kasey Anderson	Producer, Guitar (Acoustic), Guitar (Electric), Guitar (12 String Electric), E-Bow, Piano, Wurlitzer, Tambourine, Dulcitone
2004	Knucklehead	Eric Ambel	Primary Artist, Producer, Engineer, Mixing, Photography, Vocals, Guitar, Lap Steel Guitar, Organ, Soloist, Dulcitone, Composer
2004	Shimmer	Mark McKay	Producer, Guitar (Electric), Guitar (Baritone), E-Bow, Piano, Organ, Wurlitzer, Tambourine, Vocals (Background), Dulcitone
2004	The Q People: A Tribute to NRBQ		Guitar (Electric), Vocals (Background)
2004	The Revolution Starts...Now	Steve Earle	Main Personnel, Vocals, Guitar, Group Member
2003	700 Miles	Mary Lee's Corvette	Producer, Mixing, Audio Production, Photography, Guitar (Acoustic), Guitar (12 String), Organ, Drum Programming, Vocals (Background), String Arrangements, Dulcitone
2003	From Hope	Martin's Folly	Producer, Mixing, Recorder, Horn, Percussion
2003	Split Personality	The Gamma Rays	Vocals, Guitar
2003	The Songs of Hank Williams Jr.: A Bocephus Celebration		Mixing
2003	Used Country Female	Tammy Faye Starlite	Producer, Guitar (Acoustic), Tambourine, Vocals (Background), Guitar (Rhythm)
2003	What's in the Bag?	Marshall Crenshaw	Producer, Guitar (Bass), Dulcitone
2002	Chooglin': A Tribute to the Songs of John Fogerty		Producer, Vocals, Guitar, Drums
2002	Come Along	The Dark Horses	Producer, Vocals, Guitar, Organ, Tambourine
2002	Don't Let the Bastards Get You Down: A Tribute to Kris Kristofferson		Producer, Engineer, Mixing, Trumpet, Trombone, Drums, Bass
2002	Jerusalem	Steve Earle	Vocals, Guitar
2002	Perfect City	Florence Dore	Producer, Mixing, Guitar (Acoustic), Guitar (Electric), Guitar (12 String), Piano, Organ, Vocals (Background), Dulcitone
2002	The Lowdown: 1997–2002	Tandy	Trumpet
2001	Cripplin' Crutch	Joe Flood	Producer, Engineer, Mixing, Guitar (12 String Acoustic), Guitar (Electric), Guitar (12 String Electric), Percussion, Vocals (Background)
2001	Fear Not the Obvious	The Yayhoos	Producer, Engineer, Photography, Vocals, Guitar, Composer
2001	Green Pop	Big In Iowa	Producer, Mixing, Vocals (Background), Guitar (Acoustic, Electric, 12-String, Baritone), Tambourine, Trumpet
2001	Pulling up Atlantis	Demolition String Band	Producer
2001	The Bloodroot Transcriptions	Tandy	Trumpet
2000	Boarding House Rules	Tom Heyman	Mastering
2000	Down to the Promised Land: 5 Years of Bloodshot Records		Producer, Engineer, Vocals, Guitar, Lap Steel Guitar, Dulcimer, Keyboards, Drums, Percussion, Bass
2000	Lot No. 99-0038	Robert Becker	Guitar (Acoustic), Guitar (Electric), Bass
2000	Tarheel Boogie	Jimmy Nations	Guitar (Acoustic)
1999	Brand New Year	The Bottle Rockets	Producer, Vocals, Guitar, Guitar (12 String), Slide Guitar, Guitar (Baritone), Wah Wah Guitar, Organ, Shaker, Dulcitone
1999	Crown Royal	Run-D.M.C.	Guitar
1999	Get Tough: The Best of the Del-Lords	The Del-Lords	Mixing, Guitar, Bass
1999	It's Heartbreak That Sells: A Tribute to Ray Mason		Producer, Engineer, Performer, Primary Artist
1999	Man, It's Cold	Martin's Folly	Producer, Mixing, Guitar, Trumpet, Keyboards
1999	Sessions from the Flats	Ghosts of the Canal	Production Coordination
1999	Southern Lines	The Backsliders	Producer, Mixing, Guitar (Electric), Composer
1999	Stir of Echoes		Composer
1999	This Ain't No Tribute Blues Cube		Guitar
1999	This Note's for You Too!: A Tribute to Neil Young		Performer, Primary Artist
1999	True Lovers of Adventure	Mary Lee's Corvette	Producer, Guitar, Guitar (Electric)
1999	Ultimate Collection	Nils Lofgren	Producer, Guitar (Electric)
1999	West Virginia Dog Track Boogie	The Cowslingers	Producer
1998	Dolly Horrorshow	The Blacks	Producer
1998	Leftovers	The Bottle Rockets	Producer, Engineer, Mixing, Guitar, Guitar (Acoustic), Slide Guitar, Organ (Hammond), Harmony
1998	Little Big Man	Jono Manson	Producer, Mixing
1998	Popular Demons	Greg Trooper	Composer
1998	What's So Funny	Angry Johnny & The Killbillies	Guitar, Organ (Hammond)
1997	24 Hours a Day	The Bottle Rockets	Producer, Vocals, Guitar, Guitar (Electric), Guitar (12 String), Piano, Organ, Mellotron, Tambourine, Percussion, Clapping, Harmony
1997	Bug Bite Daddy	Simon Chardiet	Producer
1997	Characters		Producer
1997	Gadzooks: The Homemade Bootleg	Mojo Nixon	Guest Artist, Producer, Vocals, Guitar
1997	Killing Time [EP]	Love Riot	Producer
1997	Mexican Blackbird	The Cowslingers	Producer, Guitar
1997	Paint It Blue: Songs of the Rolling Stones		Guitar
1997	Straight Outta Boone Country		Producer, Drums, Vocals (Background), Bass
1997	Surf Guitar Greats		Producer
1996	Buffalo Nickel	Dan Baird	Composer
1996	East Side Story, Vol. 1		Performer, Composer, Primary Artist
1996	Life Is Large	The Kennedys	Guest Artist, Guitar (Electric)
1996	Martin's Folly	Martin's Folly	Producer, Vocals, Guitar, Trumpet, Piano, Percussion
1996	Mary Lee's Corvette	Mary Lee's Corvette	Producer, Mixing
1996	Maybe She Will	Love Riot	Producer, Mixing, Guitar, Percussion, Mastering
1996	Rig Rock Deluxe: A Musical Salute to the American Truck Drivers		Producer, Vocals, Guitar
1996	That's Truckdriving	The Cowslingers	Producer, Mixing
1996	The Knitter	Cheri Knight	Guest Artist, Producer
1996	Trucker's Last Dollar	The Cowslingers	Producer, Guitar (Acoustic)
1996	Waiting Around for the Crash	Go to Blazes	Producer, Mixing, Guitar (Acoustic), Guitar (Electric), Penny Whistle, Trumpet, Vocals (Background)
1996	Wooden Leg	Wooden Leg	Guest Artist, Mixing
1995	Cool Down Time	Dan Zanes	Composer
1995	Dog Days	Blue Mountain	Guest Artist, Producer, Mixing, Guitar (Acoustic), Guitar (Electric), Shaker
1995	Look at Me I'm Cool!	Simon & the Bar Sinisters	Producer, Photography, Guitar (Acoustic), Shaker, Vocal Harmony
1995	Loud & Lonesome	Eric Ambel & Roscoe's Gang	Producer, Arranger, Mixing, Liner Notes, Primary Artist, Vocals, Guitar, Composer
1995	Sing Hollies in Reverse		Producer, Performer, Primary Artist
1995	The Brooklyn Side	The Bottle Rockets	Producer
1995	The Live from Mountain Stage, Vol. 8		Guitar
1995	Whereabouts Unknown	Mojo Nixon	Producer
1994	Anytime...Anywhere	Go to Blazes	Producer, Mixing, Guitar, Guitar (Electric), Guitar (12 String), Dobro, Percussion, Vocals (Background), Composer
1994	Love & A .45		Producer
1994	Star Power		Producer, Vocals, Slide Guitar
1994	The Crying Tree	Blood Oranges	Producer, Mixing
1993	Marijuana's Greatest Hits Revisited		Producer, Guitar
1993	Rig Rock Truck Stop		Producer, Vocals, Guitar
1992	Crooked Line	Nils Lofgren	Producer, Vocals, Guitar, Timpani
1992	Just a Little	Nils Lofgren	Producer, Vocals, Guitar
1992	Lone Green Valley	Blood Oranges	Producer
1992	Rig Rock Jukebox		Producer, Guitar, 6-String Bass, Bass
1991	20 Explosive Dynamic Super Smash Hit Explosions!		Guitar, Fuzz Guitar
1990	Lovers Who Wander	The Del-Lords	Featured Artist, Vocals, Guitar, Guitar (Acoustic), Guitar (12 String), Vocal Harmony, Performer, Guitar (Rickenbacker)
1990	Otis	Mojo Nixon	Guitar, Vocals (Background)
1989	Howlin' at the Halloween Moon	The Del-Lords	Guitar
1989	Live at Raji's	The Del-Lords	Guitar
1989	Surprise	Syd Straw	Guitar, Guitar (Electric)
1988	Based on a True Story	The Del-Lords	Vocals, Guitar, Keyboards
1988	Roscoe's Gang	Eric Ambel	Primary Artist, Producer, Liner Notes, Vocals, Guitar, Composer
1986	Johnny Comes Marching Home	The Del-Lords	Vocals, Guitar, Group Member, Composer
1986	Luxury Condos Coming to Your Neighborhood Soon		Producer, Vocals, Guitar
1984	Frontier Days	The Del-Lords	Vocals, Guitar
1981	Bad Reputation	Joan Jett	Guitar
