= Keep Your Hands to Yourself =

Single by Georgia Satellites

from the album Georgia Satellites
- B-side: "Can't Stand the Pain"
- Released: November 1986
- Studio: Axis Studios and Cheshire Sound Studios (Atlanta, Georgia)
- Genre: Rock and roll
- Length: 3:26
- Label: Elektra
- Songwriter: Dan Baird
- Producer: Jeff Glixman

Georgia Satellites singles chronology
"Keep Your Hands to Yourself" (1986)	"Battleship Chains" (1986)

Video
- "Keep Your Hands to Yourself" on YouTube

"Keep Your Hands to Yourself" is the debut single by the American Southern rock group the Georgia Satellites. The song was written by the band's lead singer, Dan Baird, and was released in November 1986. The single reached number 2 on the Billboard Hot 100 during the week of February 21, 1987. The song was kept from the top spot by Bon Jovi's smash hit "Livin' on a Prayer".

== Content ==
The song is a twelve-bar blues in the key of A major with a moderate tempo of about 112 beats per minute. It follows the chord pattern A-D-A-E-A, with vocals ranging from D4 to A5.

The lyrics tell the story of a woman who refuses to become more intimate with her boyfriend until he marries her. Baird said the song "basically wrote itself" on a bus ride home from his construction job.

== Critical reception ==
Stephen Thomas Erlewine of Allmusic wrote that the song "rocked as hard as an old Chuck Berry song, as well as being almost as clever." In the book 99 Red Balloons: And 100 All-Time One-Hit Wonders, Brent Mann wrote that "it's just a timeless, kick-out-the-jams rock 'n' roll number. Dan Baird digs into the song's vocals with a no-holds-barred zest straight out of a Texas honky-tonk."

== Music video ==
The video for the single begins with the band riding on a flatbed cruising down a highway, along with flashbacks of Dan Baird and his fiancee preparing for their wedding. These scenes continue, until just before the last verse, where they arrive at the wedding, and are greeted by the guests. The band continue to play on the now-parked flatbed. During the instrumental outro, Baird is stripped of his guitar, and carried by two men over to the bride as the wedding cake comes out and is placed on the table. As Baird (now dressed in a tuxedo) kisses his new bride (after being forced by her shotgun-carrying father), it is finally revealed that the bride is quite heavily pregnant. In an overhead shot, the same flatbed, now with tin cans tied to it and "just married" painted on the bed of it, is seen cruising down the highway.

== Chart performance ==
Chart (1986–1987)	Position
Australian (Kent Music Report)	20
US Billboard Hot 100	2
US Billboard Album Rock Tracks	2

Year-end chart (1987)	Position
US Top Pop Singles (Billboard)	35

== Certifications ==
Region	Certification	Certified units/sales
New Zealand (RMNZ)	Gold	15,000^{‡}
^{‡} Sales+streaming figures based on certification alone.
