= Love Songs for the Hearing Impaired =

Studio album by Dan Baird
- Released: 1992
- Genre: Rock and roll
- Length: 41:22
- Label: Def American
- Producer: Brendan O'Brien

Dan Baird chronology
Love Songs for the Hearing Impaired (1992)	Buffalo Nickel (1996)

Love Songs for the Hearing Impaired is the debut solo album by Dan Baird, the former lead singer of the Georgia Satellites. It was released in 1992 on the Def American label, and was produced by Brendan O'Brien.

== Critical reception ==
Professional ratings
Review scores
Source	Rating
AllMusic	4/5 stars
Billboard	(favorable)
Chicago Tribune	3/4 stars
Christgau's Consumer Guide	(3-star Honorable Mention)
Entertainment Weekly	B
People	(favorable)
Q	3/5 stars
Rolling Stone	3.5/5 stars

The Los Angeles Times noted that "there's enough playful energy, wit and winsome hard-luck reflection to satisfy virtually all the jukebox needs of a Saturday night barroom crowd."

== Track listing ==
All tracks are written by Dan Baird, unless otherwise noted.

No.	Title	Writer(s)	Length
1.	"The One I Am"	Dan Baird; Terry Anderson	3:57
2.	"Julie + Lucky"		4:57
3.	"I Love You Period"	Terry Anderson	4:24
4.	"Look At What You Started"	Dan Baird; Terry Anderson	5:10
5.	"Seriously Gone"		2:52
6.	"Pick Up The Knife"		4:29
7.	"Knocked Up"	Dan Baird; Terry Anderson	3:08
8.	"Baby Talk"		3:54
9.	"Lost Highway"		3:49
10.	"Dixie Beauxderaunt"	Dan Baird; Terry Anderson	4:42
Total length:			41:22

== Personnel ==
- Terry Anderson – background vocals
- Dan Baird – guitar, primary artist, slide guitar, vocals
- Shawn Berman – assistant engineer, engineer, mixing assistant
- Pat Buchanan – background vocals
- Keith Christopher – bass, primary artist
- Tommy Cooper – engineer
- George D. – organ
- Nick "Danger" Didia – engineer
- Russ Fowler – engineer
- John Jackson – engineer, mixing assistant
- Mauro Magellan – drums, primary artist
- Gary McGachan – assistant engineer, engineer, mixing assistant
- Norman Moore – design
- Brendan O'Brien – engineer, guitar, mixing, organ, organ (Hammond), piano, primary artist, producer, background vocals
- Rick Rubin – executive producer, producer
- Benmont Tench – guest artist, piano
- Howie Weinberg – mastering
- Michael Wilson – photography
