= The Bottle Rockets =

American rock band

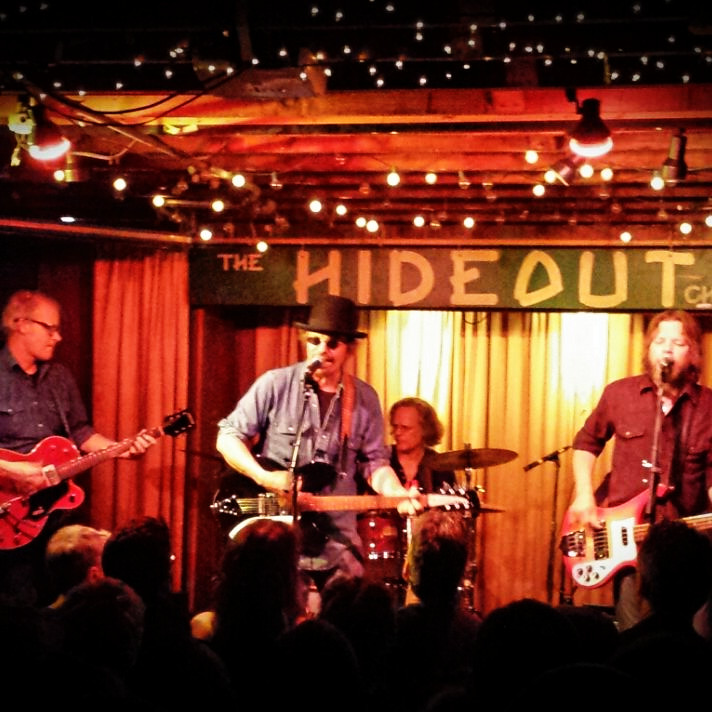
- The Bottle Rockets performing at The Hideout in Chicago in 2015

Background information
- Origin: Festus, Missouri, U.S.
- Genres: Alternative country, roots rock, outlaw country, cowpunk, Heartland rock, Southern rock
- Years active: 1992–2021
- Labels: Bloodshot, Blue Rose, ESD, TAG, Atlantic Records
- Past members: Brian Henneman; Mark Ortmann; John Horton; Keith Voegele; Robert Kearns; Tom Parr; Tom V. Ray
- Website: www.bottlerocketsmusic.com

The Bottle Rockets were an American rock band formed in Festus, Missouri in 1992, and based in St. Louis. Its founding members were Brian Henneman (guitar, vocals), Mark Ortmann (drums), Tom Parr (1992–2002, guitar, vocals) and Tom Ray (1992–1997, bass guitar); the most recent lineup consisted of Henneman, Ortmann, John Horton (joined 2003, guitar) and Keith Voegele (joined 2005, bass, vocals). Most members of the band have contributed to their catalog of original songs, as have Robert Parr (Tom's brother) and schoolteacher Scott Taylor (who writes lyrics for some of Henneman's tunes).

As noted in The New York Times by William Hogeland, the Bottle Rockets' songwriting has been likened to Woody Guthrie's folk style in spirit, smarts, and satire. The band's lyrics encapsulate the common experiences of the everyman, and are set to rousing and searing rock 'n' roll. The band has been named as one of the leaders of the '90s alt-country/roots rock revival, alongside Uncle Tupelo. The strong social commentary of their songs reflects the influences of Woody Guthrie, Neil Young and The Replacements.

== History ==
=== The 1990s ===
For much of the Nineties, Missouri's Bottle Rockets were the torchbearers for smart Southern-style rock.—Mark Kemp, Rolling Stone

The Bottle Rockets released their self-titled first album in 1993. The Brooklyn Side followed on East Side Digital, in 1994, to resounding critical acclaim. In 1995, the Bottle Rockets then signed with Atlantic Records, which re-released The Brooklyn Side. In January of that same year, the Bottle Rockets appeared on the FX morning talk show Breakfast Time in what was supposed to be an episode-long appearance, but after performing only one song, they left the studio because they were annoyed by the shows puppet Bob, and they would not return to the studio unless he was gone. Bob stayed and the band didn't return. The single "Radar Gun" was a hit on rock radio—reaching No. 27 on Billboard's rock chart—and the band toured extensively to support the album. The band appeared on the television show Late Night with Conan O'Brien performing one of their original songs as well as being featured in a comedic skit. The relationship with Atlantic Records turned out to be difficult. Most of the original staff who promoted The Brooklyn Side had been laid off or fired from Atlantic. The release of the Bottle Rockets' next record, 24 Hours a Day, was delayed until late 1997. The band parted ways with Atlantic in 1998.

The Bottle Rockets are featured in the PBS documentary The Mississippi River of Song: The Grassroots of American Music. In the series, which is narrated by Ani DiFranco, Brian Henneman says that he and the band are "reporters from the heartland" writing stories about their friends. The Bottle Rockets performed live at the Smithsonian Institution in Washington, DC at the premiere for the film, and also appear on the Smithsonian Folkways Recordings soundtrack.

Bottle Rockets then signed with Doolittle records, which later became New West Records. Doolittle released an EP of outtakes from 24 Hours A Day called Leftovers in 1998. About this time, Tom Ray was replaced on bass by Robert Kearns. The Bottle Rockets' fourth full-length record, Brand New Year, was released on Doolittle in 1999. "Power hooks and muscular guitar fights that would make Skynyrd proud" and "'70s power rock with a dirty edge—sort of ZZ Top meets Lynyrd Skynyrd meets Bad Company" is the calling card of Brand New Year.

=== 2000–2005 ===
The Bottle Rockets performed at the Horseshoe Tavern in early 2000. The band again had problems with their record label, and did not record anything else until Songs of Sahm, a collection of songs by Doug Sahm, which came out on Chicago label Bloodshot Records in early 2002. Shortly after finishing this record, Parr left the band. Bottle Rockets toured as a three-piece for a while, and recorded their fifth full-length record Blue Sky (which was released in 2003 on the Sanctuary label), before adding multi-instrumentalist John Horton to the band.

Kearns amicably split with the band in the spring of 2005. After a brief search the Bottle Rockets named Keith Voegele as their new bassist. Voegele is from Saint Louis and has played in bands including the Phonocaptors.

After the Bottle Rockets' eponymous debut, having a radio hit ("Radar Gun") on their second album, extensive touring, and critical acclaim, the band endured a decade of subsequent hard luck, including problems with record companies, a UPS strike holding up distribution of one of their new records, band personnel changes, and family emergencies. Concurrent with the band's business difficulties, grunge and alternative rock came to prominence. As a result, the music industry effectively abandoned traditional rock artists, in favor of marketing more trendy acts. The path Henneman and the Bottle Rockets had been on seemed to disappear.

Despite those struggles, in 2005, founders Brian Henneman and Mark Ortmann got the band back on course, along with the newest additions John Horton and Keith Voegele, the current line-up of band members. The band also re-hired their manager from the early days, Bob Andrews.

=== 2006–2007 ===
The Bottle Rockets' first live album Live in Heilbronn Germany was released in February 2006. The double-disc set was recorded on July 17, 2005 at the Burgerhaus, Heilbronn-Bockingen, Germany with the band's current roster. It was released in Europe on CD and vinyl by Blue Rose Records.

Bloodshot Records released the band's next album, Zoysia, recorded in Ardent Studios in Memphis with producer Jeff Powell, in June 2006. Zoysia (zoy-zhuh), a metaphor for tolerance and centered values and common ground, is a hardy grass, plentiful in Festus/Crystal City and Saint Louis, Missouri, where these hardworking musicians grew up. After years of misleading portrayals of the band's music as "hillbilly", the band's catalog proves otherwise with themes of maturity, generosity of spirit, neighborliness, insightful self-reflection, personal roots and modern society, individualism, pride of place, slow-mending hearts, and post-9/11 reality through the filter of a couple's romance. The Bottle Rockets continued with Zoysia:

It would be a mistake to claim that Missouri's answer to Neil Young's Crazy Horse has gone soft but their first release in more than three years shows greater range and reflection than is typical for the rock-solid quartet. The opening "Better Than Broken", the brooding "Happy Anniversary", and the acoustic wistful "Where I Come From" all evoke the aftermath of romantic upheaval.... "Middle Man" could be the band's signature tune defining a sensibility that is Middle American in more than geography. The sage wisdom of frontman Brian Henneman's "Blind" and the twang of "Feeling Down" show the band's countrier side while "I Quit" has the groove of retro soul. Yet the guitar finale of the seven-minute album-closing title song ["Zoysia"] finds the Bottle Rockets as explosive as ever. —Don McLeese

Zoysia received positive reviews, including a spot on novelist/audiophile Stephen King's Best Records of 2006 list in Entertainment Weekly magazine.

=== 2008: 15th anniversary year ===
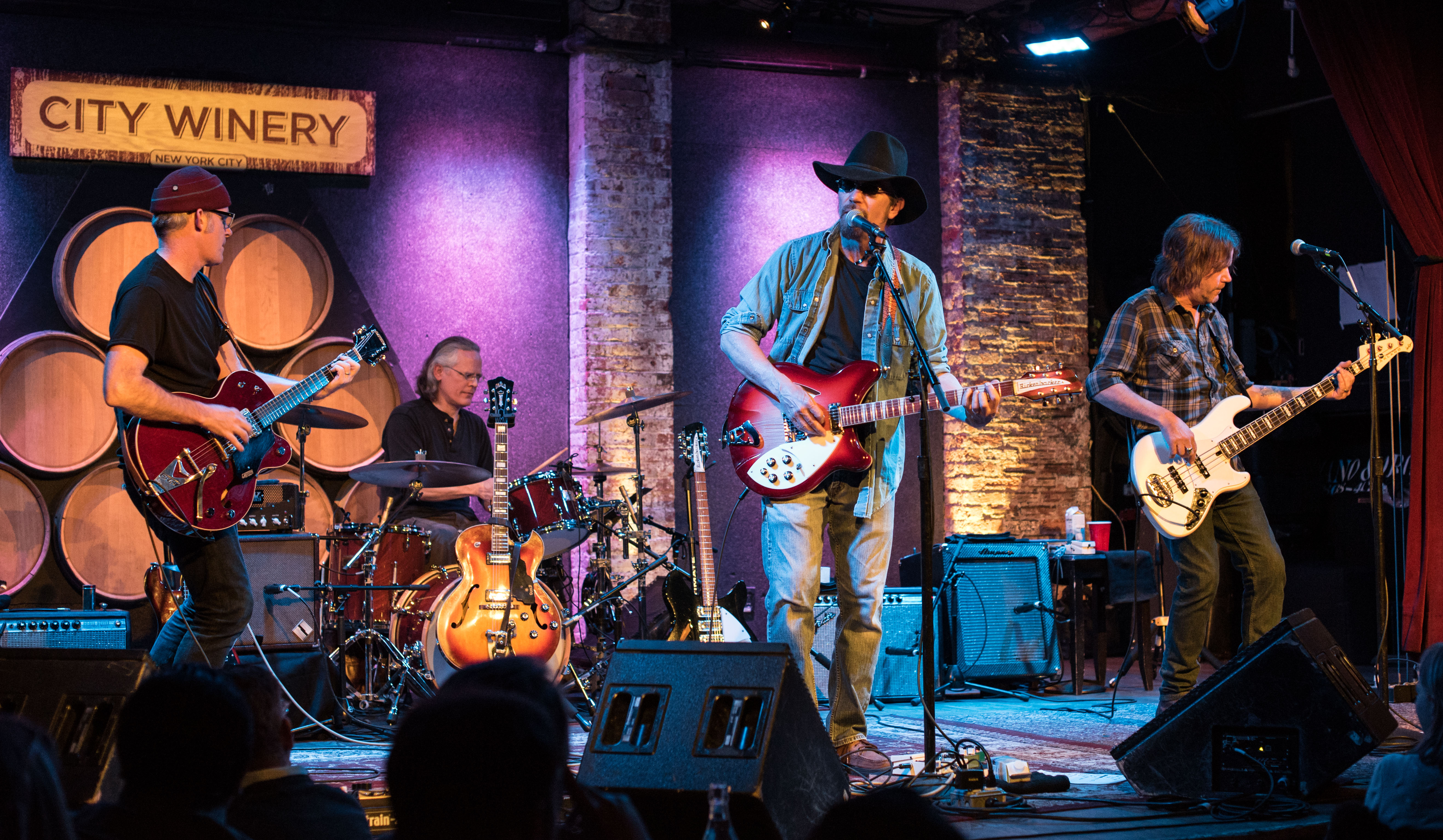
The Bottle Rockets at City Winery (New York City) January 2016

The band celebrated its 15th anniversary throughout 2008. Instead of extensive touring like in previous years, the band played only 15 shows in select cities during the entire year.

The Bottle Rockets' reputation as the underdog spokesmen translated into a collaboration with fans in 2008. Fans of the Bottle Rockets had a voice in the band's 15th Anniversary Tour, having been invited to design set lists for the 2008 tour from the Bottle Rockets’ catalog plus one cover song suggestion. The band hand-picked a fan's set list for each of the special anniversary shows and entered the set list winners in a year-long contest to win one of 2 grand prizes, a $1500.00 custom Golden Rocket guitar by Creston Electric Instruments or the "Bottle Rockets for life" prize package.

The results of the first such collaboration were detailed by Roy Kasten and Barry Gilbert in their reviews of the performance, in the Riverfront Times and the St. Louis Post-Dispatch, respectively.

While other artists have covered Bottle Rockets’ songs, including John Hiatt, (Hiatt recorded "Welfare Music" for Don Imus’ Ranch Record), Peter Blackstock of No Depression implores:

"...somebody, SOMEBODY record [the Bottle Rockets’ song] 'Kerosene' on your next album. Big band, little band, country rock band, rock band,...punk rock band,...somebody just get smart and give this song the respect, and legs, it deserves."

In July 2008, The Bottle Rockets reunited with producer Eric Ambel (Brooklyn Side, 24 Hours A Day, Leftovers, Brand New Year) at his Cowboy Technical Services Recording Studio in Williamsburg, Brooklyn, New York for their latest album, Lean Forward (Bloodshot).

=== 2009 ===
On May 2, The Bottle Rockets played a special concert at the High Dive in Champaign, IL that was filmed for an upcoming live concert documentary DVD release. The set list included "Hard Times," "Done It All," "Shame On Me," "Give Me Room," "Way It Used to Be" and "The Long Way" from the then-forthcoming Lean Forward album.

Lean Forward was released by Bloodshot Records. The album charted on the Billboard Heatseekers Albums chart at No. 23.

=== 2017 ===
On November 27, 2017, permission was granted to the Live Music Archive at the Internet Archive to add a collection for live audio recordings for public download and noncommercial, royalty-free circulation. As of March 2018, over 100 live recordings had been posted to that site.

=== 2021 ===
On March 2, 2021, the band announced its retirement, for reasons as posted to its public Facebook account: "It’s with a sad heart that we announce this uneasy news: Brian has decided to retire from the Bottle Rockets. Although he’s in good health, he’s been feeling the passage of time and has lost interest in anything that distracts from or takes him away from home. Unfortunately, this means the Bottle Rockets can’t continue as we know it."

== Band members ==
- Brian Henneman – guitar, vocals (1992–2021)
- Tom Parr – guitar, vocals (1992–2002)
- John Horton – guitar (2003–2021)
- Tom V. Ray – bass (1992–1997)
- Robert Kearns – bass, vocals (1997–2004)
- Keith Voegele – bass, vocals (2005–2021)
- Mark Ortmann – drums (1992–2021)

== Discography ==
=== Studio albums ===
| Year | Title | Label |
|---|---|---|
| 1992 | The Bottle Rockets | East Side Digital |
| 1994 | The Brooklyn Side | TAG Recordings |
| 1997 | 24 Hours a Day | Atlantic |
| 1998 | Leftovers | Doolittle Records |
| 1999 | Brand New Year | Doolittle Records |
| 2002 | Songs of Sahm | Bloodshot Records |
| 2003 | Blue Sky | Sanctuary Records |
| 2006 | Zoysia | Bloodshot Records |
| 2009 | Lean Forward | Bloodshot Records |
| 2015 | South Broadway Athletic Club | Bloodshot Records |
| 2018 | Bit Logic | Bloodshot Records |

=== Live albums ===
| Year | Title | Label |
|---|---|---|
| 2006 | Live In Heilbronn Germany | Blue Rose Records |
| 2011 | Not So Loud | Bloodshot Records |

== Videography ==
- Bottle Rockets Live in Heilbronn, Germany. Blue Rose
- The Mississippi River Of Song: The Grassroots of American Music. Smithsonian Institution and the Filmmakers Collaborative.
