= Esquela =

Esquela is an American roots rock band from Bovina, a small rural town in Upstate New York. Formed in 2010 by John "Chico" Finn and Keith Christopher, Esquela's current lineup includes John "Chico" Finn (vocals, bass), Rebecca Frame (vocals), Brian Shafer (lead guitar), and Matt Woodin (mandolin, guitar). Esquela has released three albums, "The Owl Had Landed" (2010), "Are We Rolling?" (2013), and "Canis Majoris" (2016). All of Esquela's albums were produced by Eric Ambel, an experienced musician and studio producer.

== History ==
Esquela formed from a series of songwriting sessions between John "Chico" Finn and his friend Keith Christopher, which evolved into a 2010 recording session that included vocalist Becca Frame. Those songs became Esquela's first album, "The Owl Has Landed." Esquela returned to the studio in 2013 for their second album, "Are We Rolling?" and added members Todd Russell (drummer) Brian Shafer (guitar), and Matt Woodin (mandolin, guitar). Ira McIntosh also played guitar on the record and played gigs with Esquela during this period. Esquela's third album, "Canis Majoris" was recorded in 2014 and 2015 and was released on February 20, 2016. Todd Russell left the band in 2016. In 2017, Esquela released a kids album called, "For The Sake of the Parents". The songs on "For The Sake of the Parents" were all written by Chico, Becca and Brian Shafer. Keith Christopher played drums on all tracks, while Chico, Becca, Brian and Matt contributed on bass, vocals, and guitar, respectively. In 2020, Esquela recorded their fifth studio album, "A Sign From God", with Eric "Roscoe" Ambel at the helm, producing and adding guitar and vocals as well. Mike Ricciardi played all drum tracks, while Keith Christopher played bass on all tracks. All recording was done remotely due to the pandemic. Chico Finn wrote nine of the ten songs. Becca Frame and Brian Shafer contributed the music to the poem "Wait For Me", written by Konstantin Simonov.

== Band members ==
- John "Chico" Finn - vocals, bass
- Rebecca Frame - vocals
- Brian Shafer - lead guitar
- Matt Woodin - mandolin, guitar

== Discography ==
=== Studio albums ===
- The Owl Has Landed (2010)
- Are We Rolling? (2013)
- Canis Majoris (2016)

== Awards ==
On September 12, 2015, Esquela took first place in The Playoff at the Rock & Roll Hall of Fame in Cleveland, a battle-of-the-bands competition that featured bands from all over the world.
