= Georgia Satellites (album) =

Studio album by the Georgia Satellites
- Released: October 1986
- Studio: Axis Studios and Cheshire Sound Studios (Atlanta, Georgia)
- Genre: Southern rock; hard rock
- Length: 37:26
- Label: Elektra
- Producer: Jeff Glixman

The Georgia Satellites chronology
Georgia Satellites (1986)	Open All Night (1988)

Professional ratings
Review scores
Source	Rating
AllMusic	4.5/5 stars
Christgau's Consumer Guide	B
Kerrang!	5/5 stars

Georgia Satellites is the debut studio album by American Southern rock band the Georgia Satellites. It contains their biggest hit, "Keep Your Hands to Yourself" (which reached No. 2 on the Billboard Hot 100, behind Bon Jovi's "Livin' on a Prayer"), and another minor hit, "Battleship Chains," written by Terry Anderson. It also contains a cover of "Every Picture Tells a Story," written by Rod Stewart and Ron Wood. Most of the other songs were written by lead singer/rhythm guitarist Dan Baird, except "Red Light," which he co-wrote with Neill Bogan, and "Can't Stand the Pain," written by lead guitarist Rick Richards, who also takes lead vocal on the tune. The album was produced by Jeff Glixman, known for his work with Black Sabbath.

== Release and reception ==
The album was a commercial success and was certified Gold by the RIAA in February 1987 and then Platinum on August of the same year. Rich Stim in Spin described it as a 'six-pack boogie-rock record.'

"Battleship Chains" was originally written by Terry Anderson and recorded by his band The Woods. The Georgia Satellites cover reached number 86 on the US Billboard Hot 100, and 44 on the UK Official Charts.

The band would release two more studio albums after this one, but none featured a song with nearly the radio and MTV success as "Keep Your Hands to Yourself," and the band finally split in 1990.

== Track listing ==
All tracks are written by Dan Baird, except where noted.

No.	Title	Writer(s)	Length
1.	"Keep Your Hands to Yourself"		3:26
2.	"Railroad Steel"		4:11
3.	"Battleship Chains"	Terry Anderson	2:55
4.	"Red Light"	Dan Baird, Neill Bogan	2:45
5.	"The Myth of Love"		4:12
6.	"Can't Stand the Pain"	Rick Richards	3:40
7.	"Golden Light"		3:35
8.	"Over and Over"		3:35
9.	"Nights of Mystery"		4:44
10.	"Every Picture Tells a Story"	Rod Stewart, Ronnie Wood	5:23
Total length:			37:26

== Personnel ==
Adapted credits from the album's liner notes.

Georgia Satellites

- Dan Baird – lead vocals (tracks: 1, 2, 4, 5, and 7–9), backing vocals, rhythm guitar
- Rick Richards – lead guitar, lead vocals (tracks: 3, 6, and 10), backing vocals
- Rick Price – bass
- Mauro Magellan – drums

Additional musicians

- Randy DeLay – drums (track: 1)
- Dave Hewitt – bass (track: 1)

Production

- Jeff Glixman – producer
- Cheryl Bordagaray – assistant engineer
- Howie Weinberg – LP mastering (Masterdisk)
- Barry Diament – CD mastering (Atlantic Studios)
- Hale Milgrim – creative director

Artwork

- David Michael Kennedy – photography
- Bob Defrin – art direction

== Charts ==
=== Weekly charts ===
Chart (1987)	Peak position
Australian Albums (Kent Music Report)|	28
New Zealand Albums (RMNZ)	42
Swiss Albums (Schweizer Hitparade)	26
UK Albums (OCC)	52
US Billboard 200	5

=== Year-end charts ===
Chart (1987)	Position
US Billboard 200	36

=== Singles ===
"Battleship Chains"
Chart (1987)	Position
Australian (Kent Music Report)	82
UK Singles (OCC)	44

== Certifications ==
Region	Certification	Certified units/sales
United States (RIAA)	Platinum	1,000,000^{^}
^{^} Shipments figures based on certification alone.
