= Glass Moon =

American rock band

- Origin: Raleigh, North Carolina, United States
- Genres: Rock, progressive rock, power pop
- Labels: Radio Records, MCA Records
- Past members: John Wheliss; Rodney Barbour; Nestor Nunez; Chris Jones; Dave Adams; Dick Smith; Bobby Patterson; Doug Morgan; Rod Abernethy; Don Ruzek

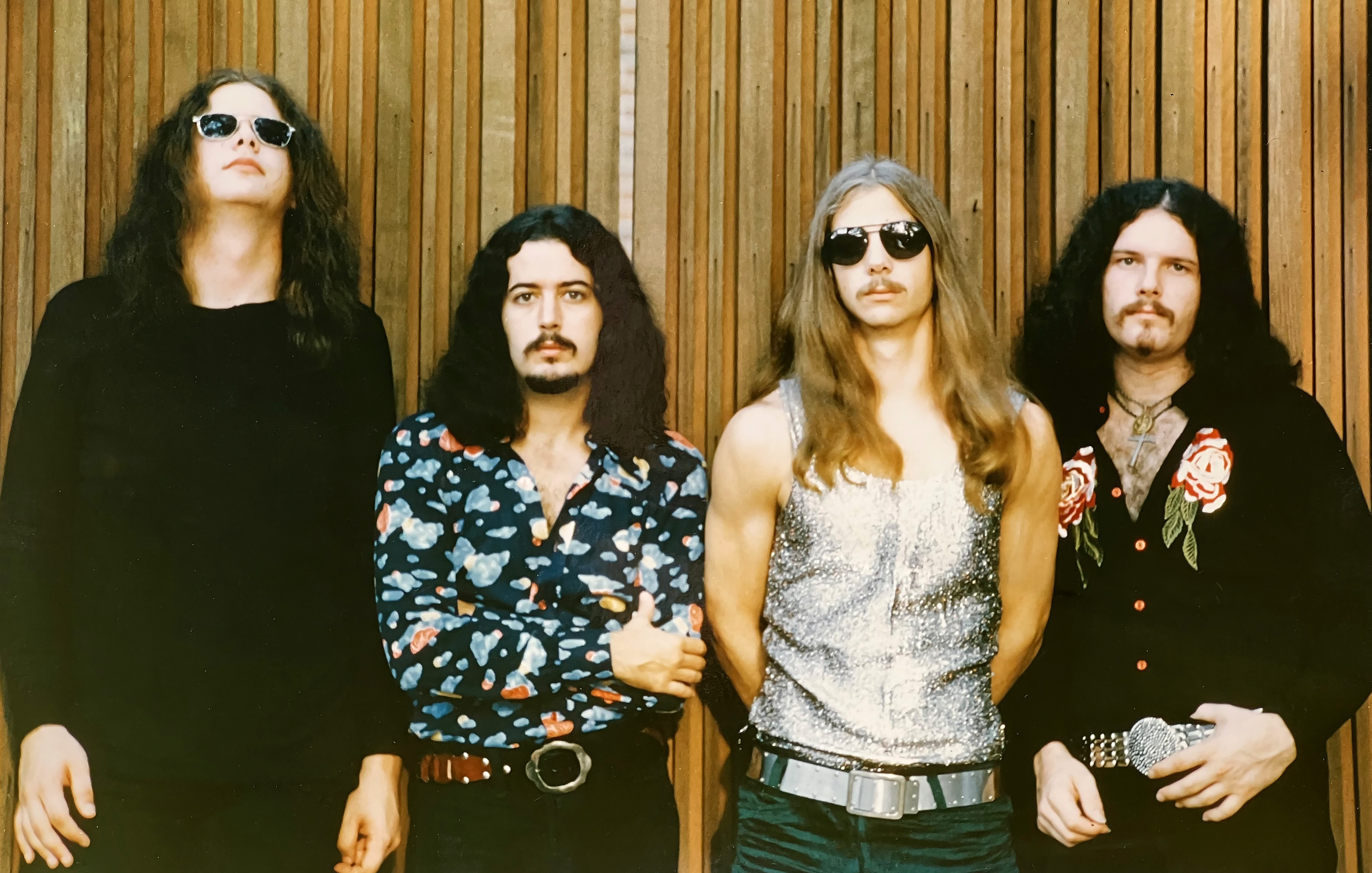
GLASS MOON ORIGINAL BAND MEMBERS

Glass Moon was an American rock band from Raleigh, North Carolina. The group released three albums and charted three singles between 1980 and 1984.

The American progressive rock group, Glass Moon was formed in the early 1970s by guitarist John Wheliss, with lead vocalist Rodney Barbour on guitar and flute, and Nestor Nunez on bass and vocals. Drummer Chris Jones joined in 1972; David Adams, on vocals and keyboards, in 1974. The band toured the east coast until 1977 when they temporarily disbanded; then reformed as a trio, with Adams as lead vocalist, and Nunez and Jones in 1978. Sideman guitarist Jamie Glaser filled Wheliss' place as session guitarist on the group's recording sessions for their first album, and after live performances with the group in 1981, was elevated to full membership for the group's second album.

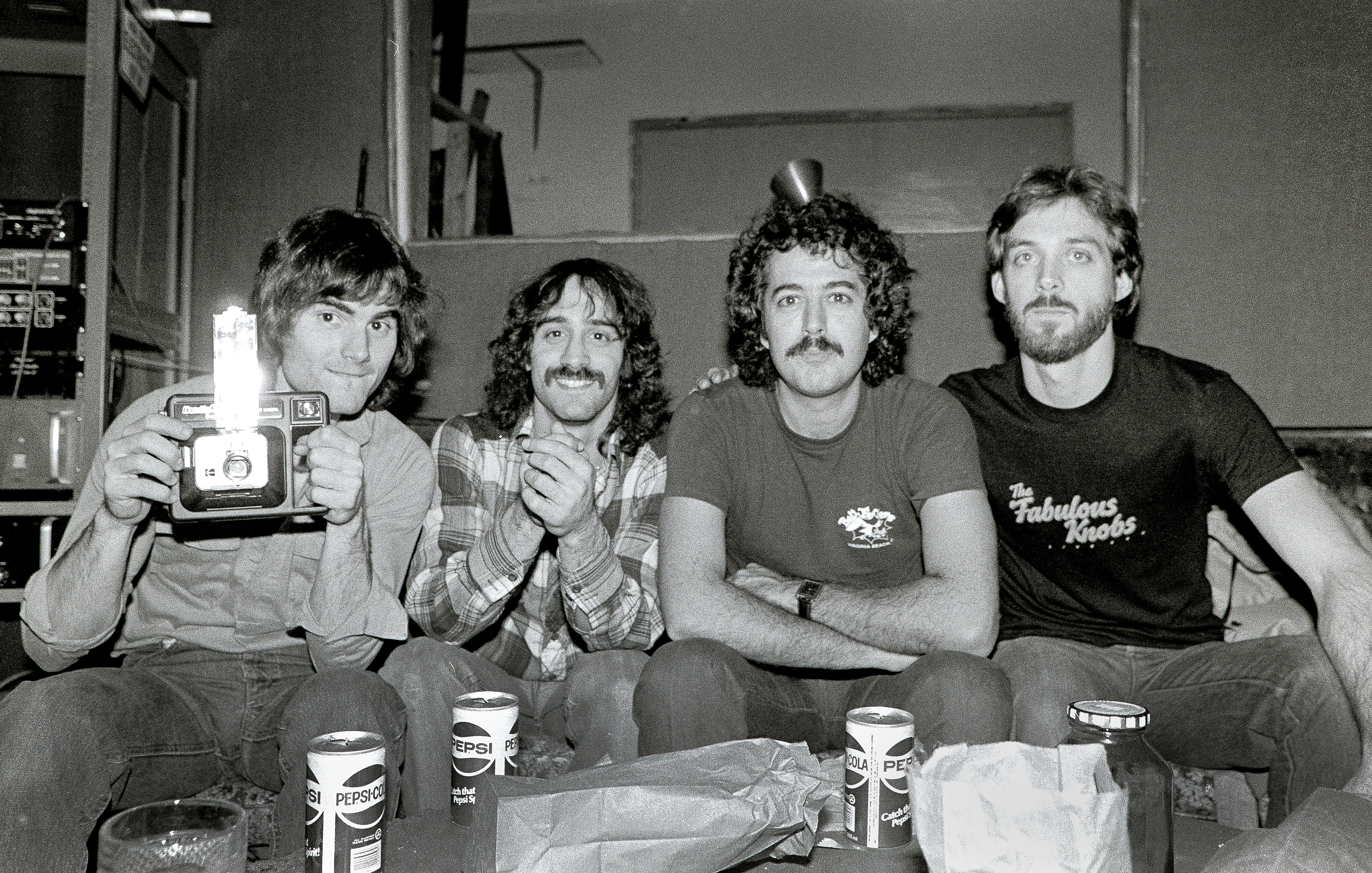
Glass Moon members in Electric Lady Studios,1981, from left, Dave Adams, Jamie Glaser, Nestor Nunez, Chris Jones

== Career ==
In 1980 Glass Moon were the first act signed to Electric Lady Productions, the company formed by Alan Selby, owner of the Electric Lady Studios in New York City, with Glass Moon, the band's debut album, recorded at Electric Lady Studios and released by the independent label Radio Records with distribution through RCA Records. Despite the lead single "(I Like) The Way You Play" stalling in the Bubbling Under Hot 100 Singles chart in Billboard at #108, the success of the Glass Moon album; which reached #148 on the Billboard album chart; was sufficient for Radio Records to have Glass Moon record a second album at Electric Lady Studios in 1981.

Release of this second album, Growing in the Dark, was delayed until February 1982, after Radio Records had secured a distribution deal with Atlantic Records. Nunez and Jones departed the band soon after the album was completed due to lack of touring support. In spite of being unable to mount a national tour, Growing in the Dark album yielded a Billboard Hot 100 single with a remake of the Hollies' "On a Carousel" which peaked at #50 in April 1982. Even though the single had only modest chart performance, Dave Adams would later state: "Needless to say, I made a good living off that song for fourteen years", while praising Atlantic Records, who had eventually agreed to distribute the Growing in the Dark album, with "On a Carousel" as its lead single: "The stellar Atlantic promotion team certainly made all the difference in making 'On a Carousel' the hit it became."

In 1984, Dave Adams reformed Glassmoon, with the group's name adjusted to one word, with drummer Doug Morgan, (formerly of 3PM); guitarist Rod Abernethy, (billed while with Glassmoon as Rod Dash), and Bob Patterson on bass. Abernethy and Patterson had appeared in the three 1982 videos prepared to promote the album Growing in the Dark, in the absence of departed Glass Moon members. (Abernethy had appeared in all three videos including the first which was for "On a Carousel": Patterson only appeared in the second and third videos which were for the album tracks "Simon" and "Telegram Song".)

In January and February 1984 Glassmoon recorded the album Sympathetic Vibration at the Bath, Somerset studio of producer David Lord. Adams co-produced the album which was released by MCA Records (with whom Glassmoon had a two album deal), in June 1984, by which time Abernethy had left the group. With Dick Smith as guitarist, Glassmoon toured into 1986. The Sympathetic Vibration single "Cold Kid" having stalled at #103 on the Bubbling Under Hot 100 Singles chart, MCA cancelled the second album and the group soon afterwards disbanded permanently. Dave Adams would record the solo album Dancing in My Sleep in 1986, and would subsequently front a band named Suicide Blonde based in the Raleigh area. Dick Smith went on to tour with both Earth, Wind & Fire, and Kenny Loggins as lead guitarist.

Adams, Jones, Nunez and Abernethy reunited in 2010 for a one-night only benefit performance at Raleigh's Lincoln Theater.

== Members ==
- John Wheliss (1971-1977) - guitar
- Rodney Barbour (1971-1977) - vocals, acoustic guitar, flute
- Nestor Nunez (1971–1983) - bass, vocals
- Chris Jones (1972–1983) - drums
- Jamie Glaser (1979-1982) guitar
- Dave Adams - (1974–1986) - vocals, keyboards
- Dick Smith (1984–1986) guitar
- Bobby Patterson (1984–1986) - bass, vocals
- Doug Morgan (1984–1986) - drums
- Rod Abernethy (1984) - guitar (as "Rod Dash")

== Discography ==
=== Albums ===
Year	Album	Peak Chart Position (US)	Label
1980	Glass Moon	148	Radio Records
1982	Growing in the Dark	-	Radio Records
1984	Sympathetic Vibration	-	MCA Records
"—" denotes releases that did not chart.
"Sympathetic Vibration" released as by "Glassmoon".

=== Singles ===
Year	Title	Peak chart positions	Album
Year	Title	US	Album
1980	"(I Like) The Way You Play"	108	Glass Moon
1980	"Solsbury Hill"	-	Glass Moon
1982	"On a Carousel"	50	Growing in the Dark
1982	"The Telegram Song"	-	Growing in the Dark
1984	"Cold Kid"	103	Sympathetic Vibration
1984	"Day After Day After Night"	-	Sympathetic Vibration
"—" denotes releases that did not chart.
