= Creston Electric Instruments =

- Founded: 2004; 21 years ago in Burlington, Vermont
- Founder: Creston Lea
- Website: crestonguitars.com

Creston Electric Instruments is a producer of vintage-style custom solid body and chambered electric guitars and basses. Known to players as "Crestons", these guitars are sometimes made using unconventional woods for bodies such as sugar pine and butternut. Lifelong musician and former carpenter, founder Creston Lea combined two passions to create Creston Electric Instruments in 2004 after several years of repairing and producing guitars in Burlington, Vermont. Creston Guitars are played by several notable musicians in the alt-country, country, blues and rock genre. Crestons have been made from centuries-old barn beams, spare instrument parts from customers, and common lumber yard 2x12 planks. While customers can specify unorthodox materials, many choose traditional hardwoods for solid body guitars such as ash, poplar, mahogany and basswood. The company outsources its guitar necks.
