= Fear Not the Obvious =

Studio album by the Yayhoos
- Released: September 26, 2001
- Recorded: 1996
- Genre: Rock
- Length: 46:50
- Label: Bloodshot
- Producer: Eric Ambel

The Yayhoos chronology
Fear Not the Obvious (2001)	Put The Hammer Down (2006)

Fear Not the Obvious is the first album by the Yayhoos, released in 2001.

"Bottle and a Bible" was included on the Ace Records compilation of songs played on Bob Dylan's Theme Time Radio Hour.

== Production ==
The album was recorded and produced by band member Eric Ambel at drummer Terry Anderson's father's barn in rural North Carolina. It was released about five years after it was recorded.

== Critical reception ==
Professional ratings
Review scores
Source	Rating
AllMusic	3/5 stars
Robert Christgau	(2-star Honorable Mention)

No Depression wrote that the band sound "like every band that ever staggered through three sets a night for all the beer they could drink." The Washington Post wrote that "the Yayhoos go for the most reliable basics of rock 'n' roll — a whomping 4/4 beat, lyrics full of barroom jokes and pick-up lines, noisy guitars, three chords and a cloud of dust." Exclaim! wrote: "It's actually a little unnerving how easily Baird and Ambel are able to update the classic Faces vibe when contemporaries like the Black Crowes seem to labour over it." Greil Marcus described the sound as "a foursome with bad teeth in a fearless stumble into the Faces' A Nod Is as Good as a Wink ... to a Blind Horse."

== Track listing ==
1. "What Are We Waiting For" (Eric Ambel, Terry Anderson) – 2:57
2. "Get Right with Jesus" (Dan Baird) – 4:17
3. "Monkey with a Gun" (Ambel) – 3:29
4. "I Can Give You Everything" (Anderson, Anderson) – 3:08
5. "Bottle and a Bible" (Anderson, Baird) – 3:33
6. "For Cryin' Out Loud" (Keith Christopher) – 4:15
7. "Oh! Chicago" (Baird) – 4:19
8. "Wicked World" (Baird) – 5:08
9. "Baby I Love You" (Ambel) – 4:00
10. "Hunt You Down" (Anderson) – 3:20
11. "Hankerin'" (Baird) – 3:48
12. "Dancing Queen" (Benny Andersson, Stig Anderson, Björn Ulvaeus) – 4:23
