= Terry Anderson (musician) =

American musician

Terry Randall Anderson (born December 25, 1956) is an American musician.

Anderson is a drummer, vocalist and songwriter from North Carolina. He was a member of local bands the Woods and the Fabulous Knobs. He first gained widespread attention as the writer of the song "Battleship Chains" by the band The Georgia Satellites on their 1986 debut album Georgia Satellites.

When Dan Baird left The Georgia Satellites he covered Anderson's song "I Love You Period" on his 1992 album Love Songs for the Hearing Impaired. Subsequently Baird and Anderson performed together as part of the band The Yayhoos.

In 1995, Anderson released his first solo album, You Don't Like Me, followed in 1996 by What Else Can Go Right and I'll Drink To That in 2001.

Since 2005, he has been a member of the band Terry Anderson and The Olympic Ass-Kickin Team.

== Discography ==
Albums

- You Don't Like Me (1995)
- What Else Can Go Right (1996)
- I'll Drink To That (2001)
- All My Worst.... (2002)
- Terry Anderson and the Olympic Ass-Kickin Team (2005)
- When The Oakteam Comes to Town (2007)
- National Champions (2009)
- More Smooth Jazz And Sweet Sweet Dreams (2011)
- Jimmy's Arcade (2017)
