= Lincoln Journal Star =

Daily newspaper that serves Lincoln, Nebraska

Coordinates: 40.815°N 96.708°W

- Type: Daily newspaper
- Format: Broadsheet
- Owner: Lee Enterprises
- Publisher: Ava Thomas
- Editor: Shelly Kulhanek
- Founded: Nebraska Commonwealth; September 7, 1867; 158 years ago; Nebraska State Journal; 1869; 157 years ago; Lincoln Star; 1902; 124 years ago; Lincoln Journal Star; August 7, 1995; 30 years ago
- Language: English
- Headquarters: 926 P Street; Lincoln, Nebraska 68508
- Country: United States
- Circulation: 24,985 Daily; 36,977 Sunday (as of 2023)
- ISSN: 1084-5283
- OCLC number: 33075139
- Website: journalstar.com

Location in the United States
Location in Nebraska

The Lincoln Journal Star is an American daily newspaper that serves Lincoln, Nebraska, the state capital and home of the University of Nebraska. It is the most widely read newspaper in Lincoln and has the second-largest circulation in Nebraska (after the Omaha World-Herald). The paper also operates a commercial printing unit.

== History ==
The Lincoln Journal Star is the result of a 1995 merger between the city's two historic longtime daily newspapers. The Lincoln Star, established in 1902 / 1905, was Lincoln's longtime morning newspaper while the Lincoln Journal was distributed in the afternoon / evenings. The Journal was itself the conglomeration over the decades of several previous Lincoln daily newspapers, dating back to 1867 and they beginnings of the change of Nebraska from the old Nebraska Territory (1854-1867) to the 37th state admitted to the federal Union on March 1, 1867, following its southern neighbor of the state of Kansas as the 35th in 1861.

=== The Lincoln Journal ===
On September 7, 1867, Charles Henry Gere founded the Nebraska Commonwealth. A member of the prominent Gere family, Gere was a New York state native and American Civil War (1861-1865) veteran of the United States Army / Union Army. As an attorney-at-law who had studied law in Baltimore, Gere quickly became an important figure in Nebraska, serving as the private secretary of the former Nebraska Territory (1854-1867), and the new state's first elected Governor of Nebraska. Gere spearheaded numerous local issues, specifically favoring the idea that all state government functions should be housed in one city as opposed to scattering them across the state. As such, Gere became an important voice in the nascent state capital town of Lincoln, and the Nebraska Commonwealth became its first newspaper.

In 1869, two years after moving the Commonwealth to Lincoln, Gere changed the name of the publication to the Nebraska State Journal. The following year, the newspaper adopted a more frequent publication schedule and become a daily. As his publication grew, Gere later retired from practicing law to take a more active part of his newspaper publishing work. Having served in the first election Nebraska governor's administration, the state's organizing constitutional convention, the old upper legislative chamber of the State Senate, the education commission, the committee on railroads, and the University of Nebraska Board of Regents, all were part of publisher / editor Gere's long history of involvement in local politics, civic, and educational affairs with strongly-held views impacted the editorial tone and columns of the Lincoln paper. In one editorial in 1890, Gere famously likened the Farmer's Alliance and its associated Democratic Party and future presidential candidate and longtime national standard-bearer William Jennings Bryan (1860-1925) of Lincoln, Nebraska himself, and their allied political offices candidates to "a herd of hogs", criticizing the opposition party of Democrats for disrupting the local Republican Party of Nebraska's political efforts in the state.

In 1897, J.C. Seacrest, a former reporter for the Nebraska State Journal, purchased the Lincoln Evening News, which was published by the State Journal as an evening edition. By 1922, Seacrest had changed the name of the Lincoln Evening News to the Lincoln Evening Journal and become the majority owner of the State Journal Company. Seacrest merged the two publications to create the Lincoln Evening Journal & Nebraska State Journal.

=== The Lincoln Star ===
In 1902, Lincoln gas and electric power utilities tycoon and millionaire D.E. Thompson established the Lincoln Daily Star. Eight years later in 1910, Thompson sold the Daily Star to local grain operator Herbert E. Gooch. Two decades later, the economic / financial and industrial businesses Great Depression of the 1930s, caused publisher / owner Gooch to sell the publication to the Lee Group of Davenport, Iowa, now known as the newspaper / media syndicate of Lee Enterprises, for $1,000,000 (one million dollars) in 1930. As the Great Depression wore on and deepened, financial circumstances forced the Seacrests and the Lee Group to buy minority interest shares in each other's companies in 1931 to stay afloat financially. However, the two publications remained independent in New, features and editorial pages, and controlled their own content.

=== Merger ===
Because the two papers had held minority stakes in each other since 1931, in 1937, J.C. Seacrest created a trust which ensured that the Journal would remain in the possession of the Seacrest family throughout the lifetimes of himself and his sons, Joe W. and Fred S. Seacrest, and their subsequent children. Joe W. and Fred inherited the Journal upon their father's later five years later death in 1942.

However, financial realities forced greater cooperation between the Journal and Star on the business / printing and circulation side. So in 1950, the State Journal Printing Company and Star Printing Company merged into the joint Journal-Star Printing Company. Despite being printed by the same company and sharing offices and printing presses / production facilities, the publications maintained competing news teams and ran separate stories, plus independent editorial staffs. In 1971, Joe W. Seacrest chose his son Joe R. Seacrest and his nephew Mark Seacrest to run the Journal. By 1990, the two papers in Lincoln began running combined thicker editions on Sunday/weekends and major holidays editions.

By 1995, it was obvious that the state capital town of Lincoln could no longer support two separate independent newspapers financially or in face of declining circulation. That March, Lee Enterprises bought the Journal from the Seacrest family, and merged it with the Star. The final separate editions of the Journal and Star were published on August 4, 1995; the first edition of the merged Lincoln Journal Star rolled off the presses on August 7.

In November 2025, The Lincoln Journal Star moved to a six day printing schedule, eliminating its printed Monday edition.

== Awards and alumni ==
- In 1949, the Nebraska State Journal was awarded the Pulitzer Prize for Public Service "for the campaign establishing the "Nebraska All-Star Primary" presidential preference primary which spotlighted, through a bi-partisan committee, issues early in the presidential campaign."
- Mari Sandoz served as proofreader for the Nebraska State Journal.
- Willa Cather wrote for the Nebraska State Journal from 1893 to 1899 as the fine arts critic.
