= The Georgia Satellites =

American Southern rock band

- Also known as: Keith and the Satellites (1980-1982)
- Origin: Atlanta, Georgia, United States
- Genres: Southern rock; hard rock; boogie rock; roots rock
- Years active: 1980–1984; 1985–1990; 1993–present
- Label: Elektra
- Members: Rick Richards; Todd Johnston; Fred McNeal; Bruce Smith
- Past members: Dan Baird; Keith Christopher; David Michaelson; Dave Hewitt; Randy DeLay; Rick Price; Mauro Magellan; Billy Pitts; Jeremy Graf; Kenny Head; Mac Crawford; Joey Huffman

The Georgia Satellites are an American Southern rock band from Atlanta, Georgia. They achieved mainstream success with their 1986 self-titled debut album, featuring their best-known single "Keep Your Hands to Yourself," which peaked at No. 2 on the Billboard Hot 100. Two more albums followed – Open All Night (1988) and the band's last to feature original material In the Land of Salvation and Sin (1989) – before they went on hiatus in 1990.

The Georgia Satellites resurfaced in 1993 and continued to perform live. A 1996 studio album, Shaken Not Stirred, included re-recordings of the band's older material, in addition to eight new songs. They have experienced numerous lineup changes in their career, with lead guitarist and vocalist Rick Richards as the only constant member. Their current lineup includes Richards, drummer Todd Johnston, lead vocalist and rhythm guitarist Fred McNeal, and bassist Bruce Smith.

== History ==
=== Early years (1980–1985) ===
In 1980, Dan Baird (former guitarist for the Atlanta band the Nasty Bucks), lead guitarist Rick Richards, bassist Keith Christopher, and drummer David Michaelson formed a band named Keith and the Satellites in Atlanta, Georgia. After performing in local bars, the band's line-up changed. With a new bassist, Dave Hewitt (previously with Babe Ruth), and a new drummer, Randy DeLay, they recorded a six-track demo at Axis Studios in Atlanta. During this time, the band changed its name to Georgia Satellites and played every Monday at Hedgens, a bar in the Atlanta neighborhood of Buckhead.

Jeff Glixman, who had produced, mixed, and remastered artists such as Paul Stanley, Kansas, Gary Moore, Yngwie Malmsteen, and Black Sabbath, was enlisted for production. However, soon after the demo was recorded, the band broke up in the summer of 1984. DeLay later performed with the Tony Sarno Band and the Hell Hounds around the Atlanta music circuit, before dying of cancer in 1993 at age 40.

Although the band members felt they were not making any progress on their musical path and had disbanded, their English manager, Kevin Jennings, took the demo to a small London record label, Making Waves, who liked the material and released the demo as the Keep the Faith EP in 1985. The press response to the EP was positive and prompted the band to regroup. Baird had been playing with the Woodpeckers in North Carolina. Richards had remained in Atlanta with the Hell Hounds, which included both Mauro Magellan (drums) and Rick Price (bass, formerly of the Brains). With Baird essentially joining the Hell Hounds, the Georgia Satellites were reborn and American record labels started taking notice of the band.

=== Mainstream popularity and hiatus (1986–1993) ===
In 1986, the group signed with Elektra Records and reunited with Glixman to record their debut full-length album at Cheshire Sound Studios in Atlanta. The album, Georgia Satellites, was their most successful LP, featuring the track "Keep Your Hands to Yourself". The song reached No. 2 on the Billboard Hot 100, behind Bon Jovi's "Livin' on a Prayer". It went into heavy rotation on MTV. Other lesser-known songs included "Battleship Chains" (No. 86), written by Terry Anderson, and "Can't Stand the Pain", but the Satellites never had another top 40 hit. That same year, the MTV Video Music Awards came into being. Mary Deacon won for Best Art Director for the music video "Keep Your Hands to Yourself".

In 1988, the band recorded a cover of The Swinging Blue Jeans' 1964 hit "Hippy Hippy Shake" for the movie Cocktail. Released as a single, the song reached No. 45 on the Billboard chart. The band also released its second album that year, Open All Night, which included a cover of the Ringo Starr-written Beatles song "Don't Pass Me By," though the album was not as successful as the band's debut. The lead single, "Open All Night" (backed with "Dunk 'n' Dine"), failed to chart.

A third studio album, In the Land of Salvation and Sin, was released in 1989, which included re-recordings of "Six Years Gone" and "Crazy" from the 1985 EP. Although it received positive reviews, it also failed to do well commercially, and Baird left the band in 1990 to pursue a solo career. Of his departure, Baird said, "It came about by my inability to turn in really good shows." He elaborated, saying, "I developed a very shitty attitude about the band. So, one morning I woke up and fired myself. We were together for 10 years and we weren't able to inspire each other anymore. It's like any relationship that starts getting too old. There was just certain things that started getting lackadaisical."

The band's 1993 compilation Let It Rock: The Best of the Georgia Satellites included a selection of the best tracks from the three studio albums and bonus material that had been released on the Another Chance EP (1989): "Saddle Up," "That Woman," and "I'm Waiting for the Man." Also included was a live version of Chuck Berry's "Let It Rock."

=== Reunion (1993–present) ===
After a brief sabbatical following the departure of Dan Baird, the Georgia Satellites reunited in 1993. Their current lineup, led by original member Rick Richards (lead guitar, backing and lead vocals), along with Fred McNeal (lead vocals, rhythm guitar), Bruce Smith (bass, backing vocals) and Todd Johnston (drums) continues to perform live shows. The album Shaken Not Stirred (1996), was a mix of re-recordings of their earlier material and eight new songs: "Running Out," "Let It Rock (Bye Bye Johnny)," "Deep in the Heart of Dixie," "Anna Lee," "My Fault," "Shaken Not Stirred," "She Fades Away" and "Rain."

Baird performs with his band, Homemade Sin, which features three former members of the Georgia Satellites. Mauro Magellan joined The Crashers after moving to Wisconsin in the early 1990s. Mauro played on both of Baird's solo albums and continues to tour with him as a member of Homemade Sin, which also includes bassist Keith Christopher, formerly of Keith and the Satellites. In addition, Baird performs as a member of the country groups Trent Summar & The New Row Mob and The Yayhoos.

Along with his commitment to the Georgia Satellites, Richards also plays in former Guns N' Roses guitarist Izzy Stradlin's band. They toured in the early 1990s and have recorded 11 albums. Richards, along with ex-Satellites manager Kevin Jennings, released an album entitled For Ol' Times Sake in 2013 as The Western Sizzlers, which enlisted the talents of Charlie Starr of Blackberry Smoke as well as seasoned Atlanta musicians Nicky Ford, Jeff Bakos, and Kevin "Snit" Fitzpatrick.

In September 2015, Richards reported to Hartford Courant that The Georgia Satellites were working on new music. In an April 2021 interview, however, Richards stated that the band has no plans to release a new album. The band released Lightnin' in a Bottle, a live album recorded in 1988 in Cleveland, on March 11, 2022.

== Personnel ==
=== Musicians ===
Current members

- Rick Richards – lead guitar, vocals (1982–1984, 1985–1990, 1993–present)
- Todd Johnston – drums (2001–present)
- Fred McNeal – lead vocals, rhythm guitar (2013–present)
- Bruce Smith – bass, backing vocals (2013–present)

Former members

- Dan Baird – lead vocals, rhythm guitar (1982–1984, 1985–1990)
- Keith Christopher – bass, backing vocals (1980–1982; only with band as Keith and the Satellites)
- David Michaelson – drums (1980–1982; only with band as Keith and the Satellites)
- Rick Price – bass, backing vocals (1985–1990, 1993–2013), lead vocals (1993–2013)
- Dave Hewitt – bass (1982–1984)
- Randy DeLay – drums (1982–1984; died 1993)
- Mauro Magellan – drums (1985–1990)
- Kenny Head – keyboards (1998–2013)
- Billy Pitts – drums (1993–2000)
- Mac Crawford – drums (2000–2001)
- Jeremy Graf – rhythm guitar (1995–1997)

== Discography ==
=== Studio albums ===
Year	Album	US Top 200	AUS	Certifications
1986	Georgia Satellites	5	28	US: Platinum
1988	Open All Night	77	-	
1989	In the Land of Salvation and Sin	130	-	
1996	Shaken Not Stirred	-	-	

=== EPs ===
- Keep the Faith (1985)
- Let It Rock (1989)
- Never Stop Rockin' (1990)

=== Compilations ===
- Let It Rock: The Best of the Georgia Satellites (1993)
- The Georgia Satellites - Greatest & Latest (2001)

=== Live albums ===
- Lightnin' in a Bottle (2022)

=== Singles ===
Year	Song	US Hot 100	US Rock	AUS	UK Singles Chart	CAN
1986	"Keep Your Hands to Yourself"	2	2	20	69	3
1986	"Battleship Chains"	86	11	82	44	—
1986	"Railroad Steel"	—	34	—	—	—
1986	"The Myth of Love"	—	—	—	—	—
1988	"Open All Night"	—	6	—	—	—
1988	"Hippy Hippy Shake"	45	13	37	63	—
1988	"Don't Pass Me By"	—	33	—	—	—
1988	"Sheila" (Remix)	—	—	—	—	—
1989	"Another Chance"	—	47	—	—	—
1990	"All Over But the Cryin'"	—	17	—	—	—
1990	"Shake That Thing" (promo)	—	—	—	—	—
