= Dan Baird =

American musician (born 1953)

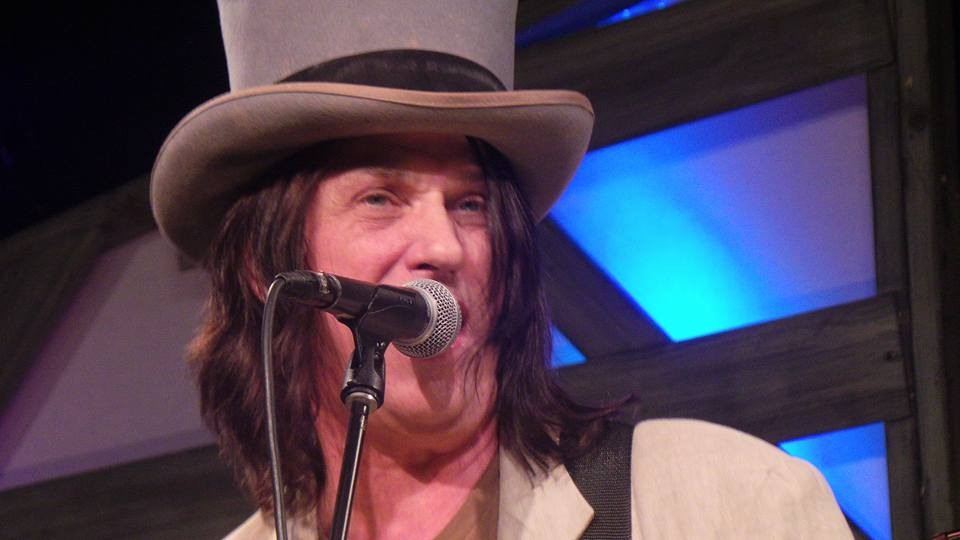
- Baird in 2015

Background information
- Born: Daniel John Baird; December 12, 1953 (age 72); San Diego, California U.S.
- Genres: Southern rock Country rock
- Years active: 1980–present
- Member of: The Yayhoos; Dan Baird & Homemade Sin
- Formerly of: The Nasty Bucks; The Georgia Satellites

Daniel John Baird (born December 12, 1953) is an American singer-songwriter, musician and producer. He is best known as the lead singer and rhythm guitarist from the 1980s rock band The Georgia Satellites. Baird formed The Georgia Satellites in 1980 and left the band in 1990 to pursue a solo career. He is often credited as one of the pioneers in cowpunk and alt-country music, which combines elements of rock music, country music, outlaw country, and punk rock.

== Early life ==
Baird was born in San Diego, California, United States. When he was about three, his family moved to Seattle, Washington, for about a year, then to Atlanta, Georgia. His father was a telecommunications engineer for U.S. Navy nuclear submarines and his mother was a housewife who worked odd jobs after their divorce.

== Career ==
Baird released his debut solo album, Love Songs for the Hearing Impaired, in October 1992, produced by Brendan O'Brien with Executive Producer Rick Rubin, who founded Def American Recordings. A review in Rolling Stone magazine praised its combination of foot-stomping redneck rock and slyly intelligent lyrics:

"This is how bluesed-up macho rock ought to be served: sizzling hot and extra lean, seasoned with a sneaky sense of humor. On his solo debut, Love Songs for the Hearing Impaired, the former Georgia Satellites frontman commands attention like a smart bar-stool bard. Dan Baird spins ribald white-trash tales to familiar Chuck Berry-derived boogie, yet the guitars emit a stinging immediacy. Retro it's not – really."

"I Love You Period", a single from the album, charted on October 10, 1992 and peaked at No. 26 on the Billboard Hot 100. "The One I Am" charted on January 23, 1993 and peaked at No. 13 on Billboard's chart for Album Rock Tracks.

In 2005, Baird began touring with his band Homemade Sin, which today features two ex-members of The Georgia Satellites, Baird and drummer Mauro Magellan. Former member of The Georgia Satellites bassist Keith Christopher was replaced during 2014 by Micke Nilsson. Homemade Sin also includes guitarist Warner E. Hodges, who tours and records with Jason & the Scorchers (a cowpunk originating band as well).

Homemade Sin performs a mixture of Baird's solo material in addition to the hits and fan favorites from his years with The Georgia Satellites. To achieve a similar classic tube amplifier sound with Homemade Sin, Baird relies on a vintage setup similar to what was used during his tenure with The Georgia Satellites. Creating confusion for some fans, there is a reformed version of The Georgia Satellites featuring original guitarist Rick Richards and bassist Rick Price, who joined the group to replace original bassist Keith Christopher, who left the band prior to their fame.

Of their album Screamer, one critic declared, "Dan Baird and Homemade Sin prove once again that they’re one of the last true rock and roll bands carrying the flag first hoisted by Chuck Berry, and they’ll continue to wave it regardless of whatever the flavor of the month happens to be, and no matter how tattered it looks."

He has recorded with other artists, including The Yayhoos and Will Hoge. Baird was one of the original members of Hoge's band before leaving to pursue individual ventures. Baird has also performed as a member of the country music band Trent Summar & the New Row Mob.

Baird also was in saxophonist Bobby Keys' band The Suffering Bastards. He also plays with the band The Bluefields, an American rock band that also includes Warner E. Hodges and Joe Blanton (Royal Court of China).

Besides The Georgia Satellites, Baird has worked on various musical projects and is a record producer. Baird owns numerous vintage guitars and amplifiers. His favorite guitar is an original Fender Esquire which belonged to Steve Marriott, who was the lead singer of English bands Small Faces and Humble Pie. With The Georgia Satellites, Baird worked with producer Ian McLagan, who was also a member of Small Faces. Baird is married and does not drink alcohol. During tours, Baird can often be found exercising in hotel gyms. According to Baird's blog on MySpace, he met Neil Young in a hotel gym locker room late one night. This provided Baird with an opportunity to make amends for his ineptness during a noisy backstage meeting the night before. The two discussed guitars and amplifiers, and Young complimented Baird on his music.

On November 2, 2019, Baird announced on his website that he is retiring from touring. "I won't quit making music, but it'll be in my basement, at my home, where I can walk my dog, go to the gym 4 times a week, shave on Friday and go to sleep with my sweetie beside me every night."

The next year brought a flurry of activity. In addition to releasing a new Bluefields album (Day In The Sun), Baird teamed up with Stan Lynch to create Heated & Treated as The Chefs. Baird formed another new band called The Hangfires during the COVID-19 lockdown with Blanton, keyboardist Jen Gunderman, and drummer Greg Morrow. Working remotely, they recorded Curly Q in 2020.

== Personal life ==
In 2017, Baird was forced to cancel the remainder of a tour with his band Homemade Sin and take the rest of the year off to battle an inherited form of leukemia. In August 2025, Dan married his partner Kim.

== Discography ==
with The Georgia Satellites

- Keep the Faith (1985) [EP]
- Georgia Satellites (1986)
- Inspired By Jack Daniels: Live In Concert (1987)
- Open All Night (1988)
- In the Land of Salvation and Sin (1989)
- Another Chance (1989) [EP]
- Let It Rock: The Best of the Georgia Satellites (1993) [Compilation]
- Lightnin' In A Bottle [2CD] (2022)

with The Harshed Mellows

- "U.S. Blues" from Deadicated: A Tribute to the Grateful Dead (1991)

As a solo artist

- Love Songs for the Hearing Impaired (1992)
- Buffalo Nickel (1996)
- Redneck Savant (2001) [as Dan Baird and the Sofa Kings]
- Out of Mothballs (2003)
- SoLow (2017)

with The Yayhoos

- Fear Not the Obvious (2001)
- Put the Hammer Down (2006)

As Dan Baird and Homemade Sin

- Feels So Good [Live] (2005)
- Dan Baird and Homemade Sin: Live #2 (2005)
- Fresh Out of Georgia LIVE Like a Satellite (Greatest Hits Live) [2CD] (2007)
- Dan Baird and Homemade Sin (2008)
- Viva Nashvegas! [Live DVD] (2012)
- Circus Life (2013)
- Dr. Dixie's Rollin' Bones [LP only] (2013)
- Get Loud (2015)
- Sweden Rock 2016 [CD/DVD] (2016)
- Rollercoaster (2017)
- Screamer (2018)
- Battleship Chains - Live [2CD/DVD] (2019)

with The Mystic Knights of the Sea

- Cadillac Ranch / Johnny 99 (2006)

with The Bluefields

- Pure (2012)
- Ramshackle (2013)
- Under High Cotton (2014)
- Day in the Sun (2020)

with The Hangfires

- Curly Q (2020)

with The Chefs

- Heated & Treated (2020)
- Sing For Your Supper (2022)

Bootlegs & unofficial releases

- Redneck Punk (2005)
- Live at the Borderline London (2007)
