= Oh Yeah =

Oh Yeah, Ooh Yeah, or other variants may refer to:

== Music ==
=== Albums ===
- Oh Yeah (Charles Mingus album), 1962
- Oh Yeah? (album), 2026 album by Steve Lacy
- Ooh Yeah! (album), 1988 album by Hall & Oates
- Oh Yeah! (KC and the Sunshine Band album), 1993
- Oh Yeah! (Spongetones album), 1991
- O, Yeah! Ultimate Aerosmith Hits, 2002
- Oh Yeah?, 1976 album by Jan Hammer Group

=== Songs ===
- "Oh Yeah" (Ash song), 1996
- "Oh Yeah" (Chickenfoot song), 2009
- "Oh Yeah" (Foxy Brown song), 2001
- "Oh Yeah" (GD & TOP song), 2010
- "Oh Yeah" (Rottin Razkals song), 1995
- "Oh Yeah" (Roxy Music song), 1980
- "Oh Yeah" (The Subways song), 2005
- "Oh Yeah" (Taxiride song), 2005
- "Oh Yeah" (Yello song), 1985, featured in Ferris Bueller's Day Off and other films
- "Oh Yeah!" (Big Tymers song), 2002
- "Oh Yeah!" (Green Day song), 2020
- "Oh Yeah!" (Princess Princess song), 1990
- "Oh Yeah?" (song), a 2026 song by Steve Lacy
- "Oh Yeah (Work)", a 2007 song by Lil' Scrappy
- "O Yeah" (End of Fashion song), 2005
- "Ooh Yeah" (song), a 2008 song by Moby
- "Oh Yeah", a 2012 song by Aerosmith from Music from Another Dimension!
- "Oh Yeah", a 2012 song by Bat for Lashes from The Haunted Man
- "Oh Yeah", a 2010 song by Big Time Rush from BTR
- "Oh Yeah", a 1971 song by Can from Tago Mago
- "Oh Yeah", a 2012 song by Chris Brown from Fortune
- "Oh Yeah", a 1997 song by Daft Punk from Homework
- "Oh Yeah", a 2010 song by Jaicko
- "Oh Yeah", a 2017 song by Lil Wayne and T-Pain from T-Wayne
- "Oh Yeah", a 2009 song by MBLAQ from Just BLAQ
- "Oh Yeah", a 2014 song by T.I. from Paperwork
- "Oh Yeah!", a 1991 song by Alanis Morissette from Alanis
- "Oh, Yeah!", a 2002 song by the Big Tymers from Hood Rich
- "Ooh Yeah", a 2003 song by the Riverboat Gamblers from Something to Crow About
- "Ooh-Yeah", a 1998 song by Lee Ritenour from This Is Love

== Other uses ==
- Oh Yeah (music centre), a music centre in Northern Ireland
- Oh, Yeah! (1929 film), an American action film directed by Tay Garnett
- Oh Yeah! (2025 film), a short American documentary film directed by Nick Canfield
- Oh Yeah! Cartoons, an American cartoon program
- Oh Yeah! (advertising slogan), an advertising slogan commonly said in Kool-Aid commercials

== See also ==
- Ah Yeah (disambiguation)
- "Oh Yes", a 2006 song by Juelz Santana
