= November 1940 =

Month of 1940

<<	November 1940					>>
Su	Mo	Tu	We	Th	Fr	Sa
					1	2
3	4	5	6	7	8	9
10	11	12	13	14	15	16
17	18	19	20	21	22	23
24	25	26	27	28	29	30

The following events occurred in November 1940:

== November 1, 1940 (Friday) ==
- Turkey declared neutrality in the Greco-Italian War.
- Italian forces reached the Thyamis River.
- Born: Ramesh Chandra Lahoti, 35th Chief Justice of India, in Guna, British India (d. 2022)

== November 2, 1940 (Saturday) ==
- The Battle of Elaia–Kalamas began.
- One of the most extraordinary aviation incidents of the war took place. Greek Air Force pilot Marinos Mitralexis, after running out of ammunition, rammed an Italian bomber. Mitralexis then landed his plane and captured the Italian crew who had parachuted to safety.
- German submarine U-69 was commissioned, the first Type VIIC U-boat of Nazi Germany's Kriegsmarine which became its most numerous class with 568 commissioned during the War.
- Died: Big Nose Kate, 89, Hungarian-born prostitute and common-law wife of Old West gunfighter Doc Holliday.

== November 3, 1940 (Sunday) ==
- The Greeks recaptured Samarina from the Italians.
- After enduring 57 consecutive nights of bombing since the Blitz began, London went a night without being bombed.
- Born: Harry T. Edwards, jurist and legal scholar, in New York City
- Died: Manuel Azaña, 60, Prime Minister of the Second Spanish Republic; Lewis Hine, 66, American sociologist and photographer

== November 4, 1940 (Monday) ==
- The Royal Navy began Operation MB8 to protect supply convoys in the Mediterranean.
- Born: Delbert McClinton, musician, in Lubbock, Texas
- A Junkers Ju 52 commercial flight going from Roboré to Puerto Suárez crashed during a storm, killing all 14 passengers.

== November 5, 1940 (Tuesday) ==
- The United States presidential election was held. Franklin D. Roosevelt won an unprecedented third term as President of the United States, carrying 38 of 48 states.
- The German heavy cruiser Admiral Scheer located Allied convoy HX 84 in the North Atlantic and sank the British armed merchant cruiser Jervis Bay and five cargo ships.
- Died: Edward Fegen, 49, Royal Navy officer and Victoria Cross recipient (killed in the Jervis Bay sinking); Otto Plath, 55, German-born American author, professor of biology, entomologist and father of poet Sylvia Plath

== November 6, 1940 (Wednesday) ==
- British, Sudanese and Indian troops counterattacked the Italian garrisons at Gallabat and Metemma.
- Born: Dieter F. Uchtdorf, aviator, airline executive and religious leader, in Mährisch-Ostrau, Protectorate of Bohemia and Moravia
- Died: Hubert Adair, 22 or 23, British fighter pilot (killed in action over Southampton)

== November 7, 1940 (Thursday) ==
November 7, 1940: Film of the Tacoma Narrows Bridge collapse.

- Irish Taoiseach Éamon de Valera rejected a British request that strategic naval ports and air bases on Irish territory be rendered or leased to Britain.
- Tacoma Narrows Bridge in Washington collapsed only four months after it opened.
- German submarine U-551 was commissioned.
- The Symphony in C by Igor Stravinsky was premiered by the Chicago Symphony Orchestra.
- Born: Mike Clark, NFL placekicker, in Marshall, Texas (d. 2002)

== November 8, 1940 (Friday) ==
- The Battle of Elaia–Kalamas ended in victory for the Greek defenders.
- The Battle of Gabon began.
- Deutsche Lufthansa Ju 90 crash: A Deutsche Lufthansa Junkers Ju 90 crashed in Schönteichen en route from Berlin to Budapest, killing all 29 aboard.
- The American steamship City of Rayville hit a German naval mine and sank in the Bass Strait off Cape Otway, Australia, the first U.S. vessel lost during World War II.
- The adventure film The Mark of Zorro starring Tyrone Power was released.
- Died: Evandro Chagas, 35, Brazilian physician and biomedical scientist (plane crash)

== November 9, 1940 (Saturday) ==
- Union confederations were banned in Vichy France.
- Died: Neville Chamberlain, 71, Prime Minister of the United Kingdom; John Henry Kirby, 79, American businessman

== November 10, 1940 (Sunday) ==
- The Vrancea earthquake struck Romania, registering 7.7 on the Richter scale and killing 1,000 people.
- The first aircraft to be ferried from Gander, Newfoundland to the United Kingdom took off. The formation of seven Lockheed Hudson bombers landed the next morning at Alder grove, Northern Ireland after a 10-hour-12-minute-43-second flight. Over the course of the war some 10,000 aircraft would travel this route from North America to Europe.
- The Little Norway air force training camp opened in the bay area of Toronto, Canada on the shores of Lake Ontario.
- Fala the Scottish Terrier, one of the most famous presidential pets in American history, moved into the White House.
- The Copacabana nightclub opened in New York City.
- Born: Screaming Lord Sutch, musician and founder of the Official Monster Raving Loony Party, in Hampstead, London, England (d. 1999)
- The 2600th Anniversary Celebrations of the Japanese Empire happened.

== November 11, 1940 (Monday) ==
- Operation MB8 ended in British success.
- The Battle of Taranto began off Taranto, Italy. The Royal Navy launched the first all-aircraft ship-to-ship naval attack in history.
- The Armistice Day Blizzard occurred in the Midwestern United States, causing a total of 145 deaths.
- Died: Hàn Mặc Tử, 28, Vietnamese poet (leprosy)

== November 12, 1940 (Tuesday) ==
- The Battle of Taranto ended in decisive British victory.
- The Battle of Gabon ended in Allied victory.
- The Battle of the Strait of Otranto was fought, resulting in Allied victory.
- German–Soviet Axis talks: Soviet Foreign Minister Vyacheslav Molotov met with Adolf Hitler and Joachim von Ribbentrop in Berlin for a conference that would last through November 14. The main topic of discussion was defining the world spheres of influence between Germany, Italy, Japan and the Soviet Union.
- Hitler issued Directive No. 18 on the German seizure of Gibraltar, codenamed Operation Felix.
- The U.S. Supreme Court decided Hansberry v. Lee.
- Born: Glenn Stetson, singer, concert promoter and television producer, in the Ottawa Valley, Ontario, Canada (d. 2003)
- Died: Joe Quinn, 75, Australian baseball player

== November 13, 1940 (Wednesday) ==
- The Battle of Pindus ended in Greek victory.
- The Handley Page Halifax bomber was introduced.
- German submarine U-149 was commissioned.
- RAF Bomber Command, aware of reports of high-level Nazi-Soviet negotiations in Berlin, conducts air raids over the German capital. The raids do little physical damage, but succeed in embarrassing the hosts by forcing them to re-locate the discussions to an air raid shelter and cause the Soviet delegation to question German claims regarding the supposedly imminent British defeat.
- The Walt Disney animated film Fantasia, the first commercial film shown in stereophonic sound, had its world premiere at the Broadway Theatre in New York City. It was the first box office failure for Disney, though it recouped its cost years later and became one of the most highly regarded of Disney's films.
- Died: Johann Urban, 77, Austrian chemist and industrialist

== November 14, 1940 (Thursday) ==
- The Battle of Morava–Ivan began.
- The most devastating attack of the Coventry Blitz occurred.
- The Nazis legalized the human consumption of dog meat within the German Reich, effective January 1.
- The Queens–Midtown Tunnel was opened to traffic in New York City.

== November 15, 1940 (Friday) ==
- Isoroku Yamamoto was promoted to the rank of admiral in the Imperial Japanese Navy.
- The comedy team of Abbott and Costello made their screen debut in the comedy film One Night in the Tropics.
- Born: Roberto Cavalli, fashion designer, in Florence, Italy (d. 2024); Sam Waterston, actor, producer and director, in Cambridge, Massachusetts

== November 16, 1940 (Saturday) ==
- The Warsaw Ghetto was officially sealed, cutting off 380,000 Jews from the rest of the world.
- The Battle of Korçë began.
- The RAF bombed Berlin, Hamburg, Bremen and other cities in retaliation for the Coventry bombing.
- Germany expelled 70,000 Lorrainers from northeast France.
- In American college football, the famous Fifth Down Game was played between Cornell and Dartmouth. Cornell appeared to have won 7-3 but officials reviewing game film discovered they had made an error that allowed Cornell an extra down during the final seconds of the game that led to a touchdown. Cornell forfeited the game as a result.
- Died: Patrick MacSwiney, 54, Irish Catholic priest and scholar

== November 17, 1940 (Sunday) ==
- The British attempted Operation White, an attempt to deliver fourteen aircraft from the carrier HMS Argus to Malta, but only five planes made it due to bad weather and the presence of the Italian Fleet.
- Sholto Douglas, 1st Baron Douglas of Kirtleside replaced Sir Hugh Dowding as Commander-in-Chief of RAF Fighter Command.
- The Tartu Art Museum was established in Tartu, Estonia.
- Born: Luke Kelly, folk musician, in Sheriff Street, Dublin, Ireland (d. 1984)
- Died: Ralph Barnes, 41, American journalist (plane crash); Eric Gill, 58, English sculptor and printmaker; Raymond Pearl, 61, American biologist

== November 18, 1940 (Monday) ==
- Count Ciano met with Hitler at the Berghof. Hitler was pessimistic over the situation in the Balkans but became enthusiastic on the subject of negotiating an alliance with Yugoslavia.
- Gauleiter Josef Bürckel expelled 100,000 Lorrainers who wanted to keep their French citizenship.
- A large fire destroyed most of The Business District of Mount Washington, Kentucky.
- Born: Qaboos bin Said al Said, Sultan of Oman, in Salalah, Oman (d. 2020)
- Died: Ivane Javakhishvili, 64, Georgian historian

== November 19, 1940 (Tuesday) ==
- About 900 people were killed in a German bombing raid on Birmingham.
- Died: Charles W. Woodworth, 75, American entomologist

== November 20, 1940 (Wednesday) ==
- Hungary joined the Tripartite Pact.
- Born: Helma Sanders-Brahms, film director, screenwriter, producer and actress, in Lower Saxony, Germany (d. 2014)
- Died: Harriot Eaton Stanton Blatch, 84, American writer and suffragist

== November 21, 1940 (Thursday) ==
- Hitler received Ion Antonescu at the Reich Chancellory in Berlin and indicated his plans to attack the Soviet Union.
- Italian forces were pushed well back into Albania.
- German submarine U-110 was commissioned.
- Born: Dr. John, musician, in New Orleans, Louisiana (d. 2019); Richard Marcinko, U.S. Navy SEAL commander, author and radio talk show host, in Lansford, Pennsylvania (d. 2021)

== November 22, 1940 (Friday) ==
- The Battle of Korytsa ended in Greek victory.
- All Star Comics #3 was published, marking the debut of the first team of superheroes, the Justice Society of America.
- Born: Terry Gilliam, filmmaker, animator and member of the Monty Python comedy troupe, in Minneapolis, Minnesota

== November 23, 1940 (Saturday) ==
- The Battle of Morava–Ivan ended in Greek victory.
- Romania joined the Tripartite Pact.
- Southampton Blitz: The first sustained air raid on Southampton occurred. 77 were killed and more than 300 injured.
- The Belgian government in exile declared war on Italy. Belgian Congolese forces would now co-ordinate with the British to fight the Italians in Africa.
- German submarine U-70 was commissioned.
- Born: Luis Tiant, baseball player, in Marianao, Cuba (d. 2024)
- Died: Billy Jones, 51, American singer and co-star of The Happiness Boys radio program

== November 24, 1940 (Sunday) ==
- The Slovak Republic signed the Tripartite Pact.
- The first major air raid of the Bristol Blitz took place.
- Died: James Craig, 1st Viscount Craigavon, 69, 1st Prime Minister of Northern Ireland

== November 25, 1940 (Monday) ==
- Kichisaburō Nomura was named Japanese Ambassador to the United States.
- The Central Hubei Operation began in China.
- Patria disaster: The French-built ocean liner SS Patria was sunk in the Port of Haifa when a bomb exploded on board. 267 were killed and 172 injured. It was not until 1957 that the underground paramilitary group Haganah was revealed to be the party responsible.
- The de Havilland Mosquito and the Martin B-26 Marauder both made their first flights.
- The U.S. Supreme Court decided Helvering v. Horst.
- Woody Woodpecker made his debut in the animated short, Knock Knock.
- The National Advisory Committee for Aeronautics (NACA) announced that it would build a new laboratory in Cleveland, Ohio. The Aircraft Engine Research Laboratory (AERL) would be established in 1941. It was renamed the NACA Lewis Flight Propulsion Laboratory in 1948 and the Lewis Research Center in 1958, the same year that the NACA became the National Aeronautics and Space Administration (NASA). NASA Lewis was renamed again in 1999 as the John H. Glenn Research Center at Lewis Field.
- Born: Joe Gibbs, American football coach, in Mocksville, North Carolina; Percy Sledge, singer, in Leighton, Alabama (d. 2015)

== November 26, 1940 (Tuesday) ==
- The Jilava Massacre took place overnight near Bucharest, Romania. The Iron Guard executed 64 members of the old government of deposed King Carol II of Romania.
- In the wake of the German–Soviet Axis talks, Vyacheslav Molotov told the German ambassador to the Soviet Union that the USSR was willing to join a four-power pact with Germany, Italy and Japan if new Soviet territorial demands were met, including expansion into the Persian Gulf and the annexation of Finland. Hitler called Stalin a "cold-blooded blackmailer" and refused to make any response to the Soviet proposal.
- Died: Gheorghe Argeșanu, 57, Romanian cavalry general and Prime Minister of Romania (killed in the Jilava Massacre); Harold Harmsworth, 1st Viscount Rothermere, 72, English newspaper proprietor

== November 27, 1940 (Wednesday) ==
- The Battle of Cape Spartivento was fought, ending indecisively.
- German submarine U-150 was commissioned.
- A plane bound for Syria piloted by the French aviator Henri Guillaumet with the newly appointed High Commissioner of the Levant Jean Chiappe among the passengers was mistakenly shot down over the Mediterranean by an Italian fighter plane.
- Born: Bruce Lee, martial artist and actor, in Chinatown, San Francisco, California (d. 1973)
- Died: Jean Chiappe, French civil servant; Henri Guillaumet, 38, French aviator

== November 28, 1940 (Thursday) ==
- The Germans bombed Liverpool and killed 166 civilians when a parachute mine caused a blast of boiling water and gas in an underground shelter.
- The antisemitic Nazi propaganda film The Eternal Jew premiered in Berlin.
- Tom Harmon of the University of Michigan won the Heisman Trophy.
- The Ottawa Rough Riders defeated the Toronto Balmy Beach Beachers 8-2 in the first of the two-game series for the 28th Grey Cup of Canadian football.
- Died: Frank Tinney, 62, American blackface comedian and actor

== November 29, 1940 (Friday) ==
- German military leaders issued a draft plan for the German invasion of the Soviet Union.
- The light cruiser HMS Leander bombarded Mogadishu.
- The comedy film The Bank Dick starring W. C. Fields was released.
- Born: Chuck Mangione, flugelhorn player, trumpeter and composer, in Rochester, New York (d. 2025)

== November 30, 1940 (Saturday) ==
- The Central Hubei Operation and the year-long Battle of South Guangxi ended in Chinese victory.
- A six-hour attack occurred in the Southampton Blitz, killing 137 people.
- In Philadelphia on the 50th anniversary of the Army–Navy Game, Navy won 14-0.
- Died: John A. Hartwell, 71, American football player and coach, military officer and physician
