= Glenn Stetson =

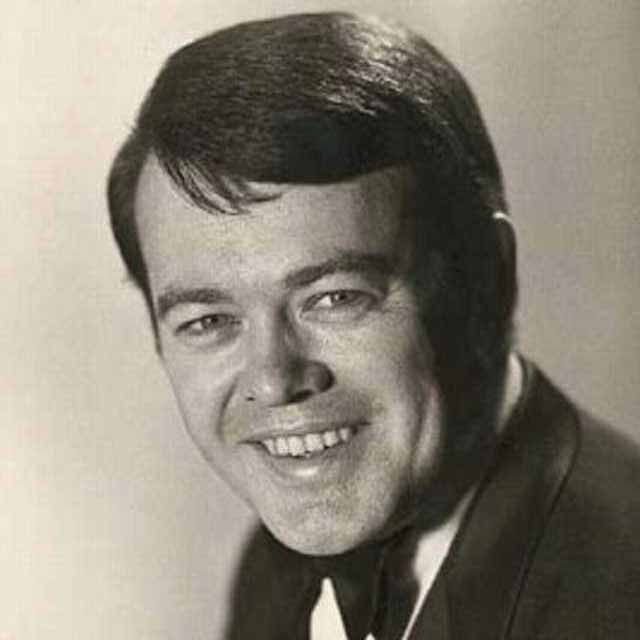

Background information
- Born: November 12, 1940; Ottawa Valley, Ontario, Canada
- Died: August 22, 2003 (aged 62) Orlando, Florida, United States
- Genres: Rock-n-roll, broadway, country, pop
- Occupations: Singer, television producer, entertainer
- Years active: 1959–2000

Glenn Stetson (November 12, 1940 – August 22, 2003) was a Canadian singer, concert promoter and television producer. Glenn Campbell Stetson was born in the Ottawa Valley (Ramsayville) of eastern Ontario and raised in Hamilton, Ontario. He was a lead singer with The Diamonds, whose hits included "The Stroll", "Silhouettes", and "Little Darlin'", from the late 1960s through the 1990s. He studied theater under Sir Tyrone Guthrie, and appeared in the original Broadway productions of H.M.S Pinafore and Funny Girl.

In the mid-1960s, he was a featured performer for Fred Waring and the Pennsylvanians. He toured Vietnam in 1966 with the USO. In 1968, he joined the Diamonds and helped keep their name and music alive through the 1970s and 1980s and 1990s, particularly on oldies tours and TV. The Diamonds toured Australia heavily in the 1970s with Australian rock-n-roll legend Lonnie Lee. Stetson released a solo album in the 1970s entitled Stetson Country that was produced by Wayne Jackson of the famed Memphis Horns. He and the Diamonds were frequent guests on Nashville Now with host Ralph Emery.

Stetson and Richard J. "Dick" Milano were founders of Little Darlin's Rock n' Roll Palace in Kissimmee, Florida (opened in 1986, closed in 1992) which was a highly popular Orlando-area venue in the 1980s. He was co-executive producer for "Live at the Palace" (hosted by Wolfman Jack) on the Nashville Network (TNN). "Little Darlin's Rock-n-Roll Palace" and associated oldies tours revived the careers of many performers, notably Fabian, Dee Clark, Tommy Sands, The Shirelles, Danny & the Juniors, and The Tokens. He was also active in charitable fund-raising and civic organisations such as the Shriners of which he was an honorary member.

Stetson received a heart transplant in 2000 as a result of myocarditis. However, his health began to deteriorate and he died undergoing an operation on August 22, 2003, in Orlando, Florida.

== Discography ==
=== Singles ===
Year	Single	CAN Country
1979	"What Are We Doing" (with Lyoness and Judy Woodstock)	52
