= Counting Stars (disambiguation) =

"Counting Stars" is a 2013 song by OneRepublic from their album Native.

Counting Stars may also refer to:

== Books ==
- Counting Stars (Almond book), 2000 collection of semi-autobiographical stories by David Almond
- Counting Stars, 2007 romance novel by Michele Paige Holmes which won an LDS Whitney Award

== Music ==
- Counting Stars (album), 2010 album by Andrew Peterson
- "Counting Stars", song by Michelle Malone from the 1987 album New Experience
- "Counting Stars", song by Sugarcult from the 2004 album Palm Trees and Power Lines
- "Counting Stars", song by Nujabes from the 2007 album Hydeout Productions 2nd Collection
- "Counting Stars", song by Augustana from the 2011 album Augustana
- "Counting Stars", song by Crossfaith from the 2013 album Apocalyze
- "Counting the Stars", 1958 song by Ladders
- Counting Stars (Be'O song)

== Others ==
- Counting Stars (horse), thoroughbred race horse
- The action creating star counts in astronomy

== See also ==
- "Just Counting Stars", 1961 song by Genie Pace
- Count Your Lucky Stars Records, Michigan independent record label
- Count the Stars, American punk band
