= From the Bottom of My Heart =

From the Bottom of My Heart may refer to:

- "From the Bottom of My Heart" (Chuck Willis song), recorded by both The Clovers and The Diamonds
- "From the Bottom of My Heart" (Stevie Wonder song), 2006
