= Ladder (disambiguation) =

A ladder is a runged climbing aid.

Ladder, The Ladder, or Ladders may also refer to:

== Art, entertainment and media ==
=== Film and television ===
- "Ladders" (Community), the first episode of the sixth season of the sitcom Community
- Ladders, a 2004 documentary narrated by Harry Belafonte
- The Ladder, a mythical burning ladder that is a Meyerism cornerstone and the theme of Cal Roberts's motivational practice in The Path (TV series)

=== Games ===
- Ladder (Go), a formation in the game of Go
- Ladder (video game), a clone of Donkey Kong, written for the CP/M operating system

=== Music ===
- Ladders (band), an American band
- The Ladder (band), a British band
  - The Ladder EP, a 2008 extended play by the British band The Ladder
- The Ladder (album), a 1999 album by Yes
- The Ladder, a 2010 album by Andrew Belle
- "Ladders", a song by Leona Lewis from her 2015 album I Am
- "Ladders", a song by Mac Miller song from his 2018 album Swimming
- "The Ladder", song by John Zorn from The Art of Memory (album)
- "The Ladder", a song by Prince on his 1985 album Around the World in a Day

=== Publications ===
- The Ladder, by Halfdan Rasmussen
- The Ladder (magazine), a US publication for lesbians

== Career-related ==
- Ladder, a career path and reference to organizational and industry hierarchy
- TheLadders, a careers website

== Finance ==
- Ladder (option combination), a combination of three options
- Ladder (exotic option), a type of exotic option

== Science and technology ==
- Cosmic distance ladder, the usage of multiple measurement methods for determining distance to celestial objects
- DNA ladder, a molecular-weight size marker used in gel electrophoresis
- Ladder frame, a vehicle frame type
- Ladder logic, a philosophy of drawing electrical logic schematics
- Ladder operator, a mathematical entity used in quantum mechanics
- Resistor ladder, an analogue circuit

== Sports ==
- Ladder tournament, a type of game or sports tournament
- League table or ladder, a chart or table which compares sports teams, or other entities, by ranking them in order of ability or achievement

== Other uses ==
- Ladder, a vertical split in the fabric of a pair of tights (in UK terminology; "a run in pantyhose" is the US equivalent)
- Jacob's Ladder, a "ladder to heaven" described by biblical Jacob in the Book of Genesis
- Laddering, an investment technique
- Wittgenstein's ladder, a metaphor set out by Ludwig Wittgenstein about learning

== See also ==
- Jacob's Ladder (disambiguation)
