= The Willows (group) =

American vocal group

- The Willows in 1953.

Background information
- Genres: Doo-wop
- Years active: c. 1952–1965, 1973, 1983-1989, 1998-2024

The Willows were an American doo-wop group formed in Harlem, New York, in 1952. The group was an influential musical act that performed into the mid-1960s and had a Top 20 R&B hit with "Church Bells May Ring", a song which was covered with greater commercial success by The Diamonds.

== History ==
Before the Willows, the group was known as the Dovers, which originally built a reputation in Harlem nightclubs and by practicing with other Harlem doo wop acts like Gloria Lynne's all-female group the Deltones. The first line-up included members Bobby Robinson (lead vocals), Richard "Richie" Davis (tenor), Ralph Martin (tenor), Joe Martin (baritone), and John "Scooter" Steele (bass), before Robinson departed to open a record store on 125th Street where he later established Fury Records and Red Robin Records. In 1952, aspiring boxer Tony Middleton joined the Dovers on the nightclub circuit where they became revered for their competitive charisma in battle of the bands-type performances.

Record producer Peter Doraine, present at one of the Dovers gigs, offered the group his services as manager, and change their name to the Five Willows to record the group's debut single, "Please Baby", for his PeeDee label. Soon after Doraine partnered his company with Victor Allen to form Allen Records, and record the Five Willows' follow-up "My Dear Dearest Darling" in late 1953. Even though it was a regional hit in Harlem and Los Angeles, the group's subsequent offerings on the label did not fare as well and by early 1954 Allen Records had dissolved. In June 1954, the Five Willows signed with Herald Records; however, after two unsuccessful singles, the group was cut from the roster the next year.

Spending all of 1955 performing, the Willows (according to music journalist Patrick Prince "they had dropped the 'Five' after Joe had overslept and missed a matinee show during an Apollo engagement") closed the year by signing with Morty Craft's newly established Melba Records. For the first recording session, the Willows brought "Church Bells May Ring" (originally titled "Church Bells"), a song their previous label rejected, and Craft had newcomer Neil Sedaka overdub chimes onto the recording. When the single was released in early 1956, it became a huge seller in New York, and charted at number 14 on the Billboard R&B chart and number 62 on the Billboard Hot 100. Had it not been for a cover version by the Diamonds, whose rendition reached number 12 nationally, the Willows' version may have obtained even more success, an issue which led to a lawsuit against Craft over royalties that the group eventually won.

In April 1956, the Willows appeared at the Paramount Theater in Brooklyn with other notable doo wop groups such as the Flamingos, Frankie Lymon and the Teenagers, and the Platters. Although the group never re-entered the national charts, the Willows still performed regularly and recorded with the Melba, Club, El Dorado, Gone, Warwick, and Heidi labels until they disbanded in 1965. The group also had a profound influence on the next wave of doo wop artists like the Drifters, the Harptones, and the Ladders. After a one-off performance in 1973, the Willows reunited for sporadic tours in 1983 until 1989. Surviving group members came together again in 1998 for an East coast tour and appeared on the PBS special Red White and Rock in 2002. The final line-up consisted of Tony Middleton, Desi Middleton (baritone), Richard Green (tenor), and Bill Pron (bass). Middleton died on February 7, 2024 at the age of 89.
