= Rippy =

Rippy is a surname. Notable people with the surname include:

- J. Fred Rippy (1892–1977), American academic
- Leon Rippy (born 1949), American actor
- Matt Rippy, American actor
- Patsy Rippy, American tennis player
- Rebecca Rippy (born 1977), American singer/songwriter
- Rodney Allen Rippy (born 1968), American child actor
- Stephen Rippy, American composer

== Other uses ==
- Rippy (film), an Ozploitation horror film about a killer kangaroo
