= January 1941 =

Month of 1941

<<	January 1941					>>
Su	Mo	Tu	We	Th	Fr	Sa
			1	2	3	4
5	6	7	8	9	10	11
12	13	14	15	16	17	18
19	20	21	22	23	24	25
26	27	28	29	30	31

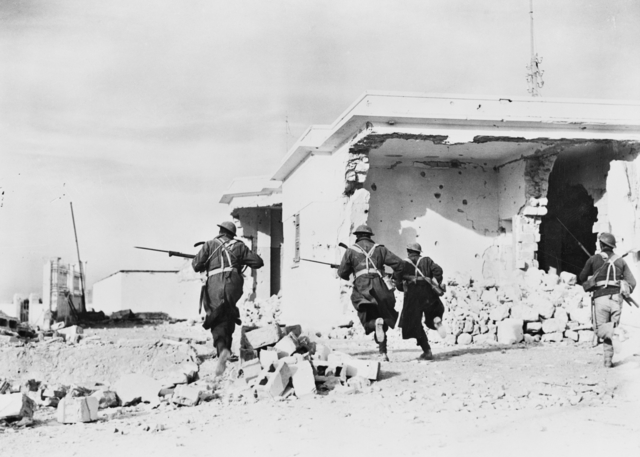
January 3, 1941: Australian troops fight the Battle of Bardia in Egypt against the Axis Powers in first major Australian involvement in World War II.

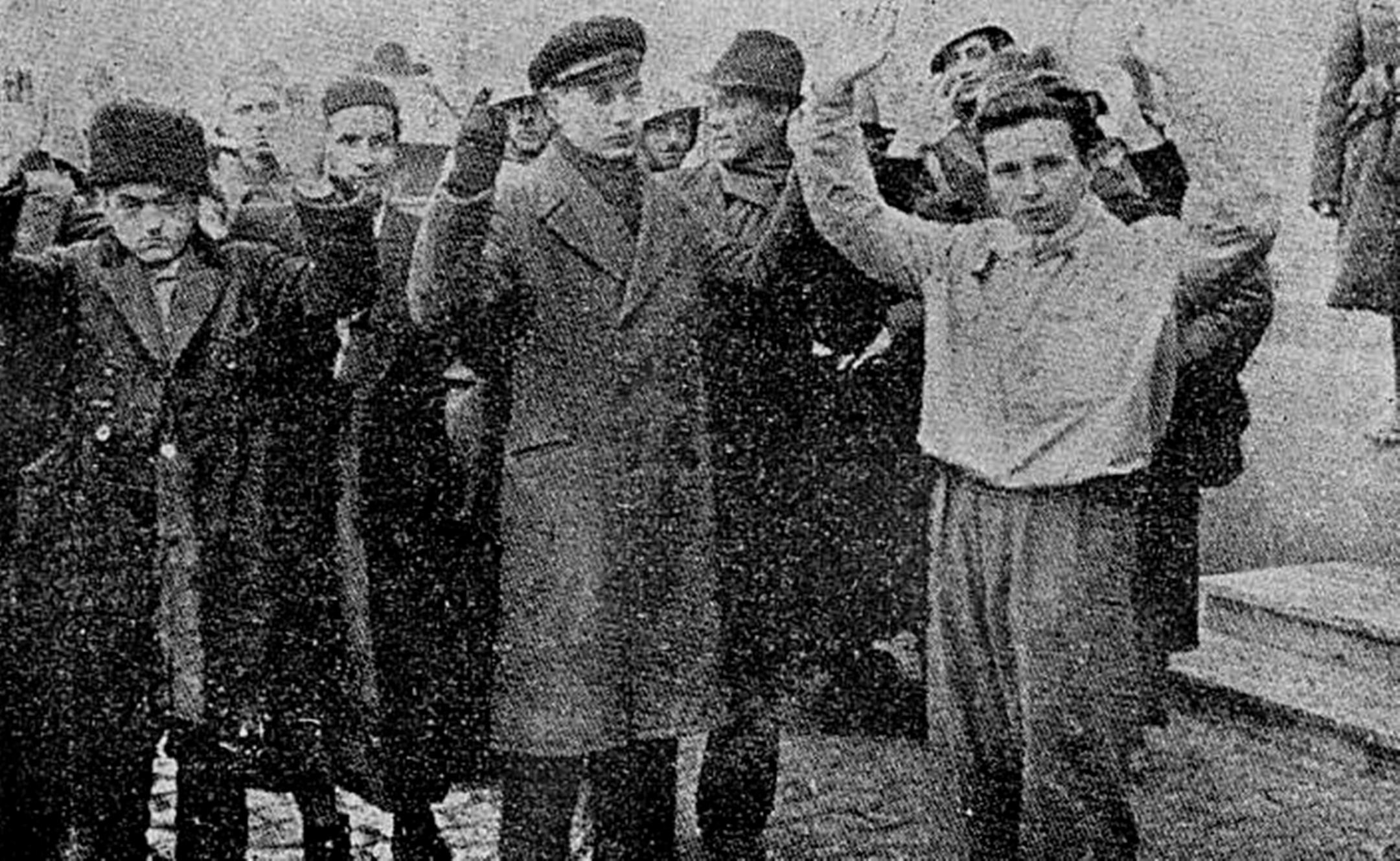
January 23, 1941: Surviving members of Romania's Fascist organization, the Iron Guard, are arrested following massacre of 125 Jewish civilians in Bucharest.

The following events occurred in January 1941:

== January 1, 1941 (Wednesday) ==
- 141 aircraft of the Royal Air Force bombed the Focke-Wulf aircraft production plant south of Bremen.
- British naval officers were encouraged to search all captured ships for encoding machines and related paperwork.
- ASCAP boycott: Music licensed by the American Society of Composers, Authors and Publishers disappeared from American airwaves over a licensing fee dispute. The boycott would last ten months.
- CBC News was founded in Canada.
- The Stanford Indians defeated the Nebraska Cornhuskers 21–13 in the 27th Rose Bowl.
- Following a hockey game between the Chicago Black Hawks and Detroit Red Wings at Chicago Stadium, Jimmy Orlando of the Red Wings exchanged harsh words with a spectator in the stands, then threw a punch over the rail that knocked the fan unconscious. Hundreds of angry fans surged onto the ice and some tried to go after Orlando, but ushers held them back. By the time police arrived to arrest Orlando he was nowhere to be found.

== January 2, 1941 (Thursday) ==
- The first bombing of Dublin occurred when German bombs were dropped on the Terenure area of south Dublin.
- Llandaff Cathedral was damaged by German bombing during the worst night of the Cardiff Blitz.
- The United States announced plans to build 200 utilitarian freighters. These would come to be known as Liberty ships.
- German submarine U-66 was commissioned.

== January 3, 1941 (Friday) ==
- The Battle of Bardia began as part of Operation Compass. The Australian 6th Division assaulted the strongly held Italian fortress of Bardia, Libya.
- The longest raid of the Bristol Blitz began, lasting 12 hours.
- Éamon de Valera held an urgent session with his cabinet and sent a note of protest to Germany over the bombing of Dublin.
- The 77th United States Congress began.
- Martin Bormann promulgated a Nazi decree banning gothic typefaces in all printing and proclaiming roman type as the new standard. The order sought to make Nazi communications more understandable in occupied France, the Netherlands, Belgium, Denmark and Norway, where roman type was used.
- The results of a Gallup poll were published asking Americans, "Do you think our country's future safety depends on England winning this war?" 68% said yes, 26% said no and 6% expressed no opinion.

== January 4, 1941 (Saturday) ==
- Allied forces reached Bardia and took many Italian troops prisoner.
- German actress Marlene Dietrich became a U.S. citizen.
- German submarine U-72 was commissioned.
- Bugs Bunny was identified by name for the first time, in the short cartoon Elmer's Pet Rabbit.
- Died: Henri Bergson, 81, French philosopher and Nobel laureate

== January 5, 1941 (Sunday) ==
- The Battle of Bardia ended in Allied victory when the last remaining Italian forces surrendered.
- The musical play No For An Answer by Marc Blitzstein premiered at Mecca Temple in New York City.
- Born: Hayao Miyazaki, filmmaker, in Bunkyō, Tokyo, Japan
- Died: Amy Johnson, 37, English aviator (plane crash)

== January 6, 1941 (Monday) ==
- U.S. President Franklin D. Roosevelt made the Four Freedoms speech during his State of the Union address. He proposed four fundamental freedoms that all the people of the world ought to enjoy: freedom of speech, freedom of worship, freedom from want and freedom from fear.
- In the Greco-Italian War, Greek forces launched an assault trying to take the strategically important Klisura Pass.
- Adolf Hitler subordinated I Wing of Kampfgeschwader 40 to the Kriegsmarine to support U-boat operations, obliging a request from Karl Dönitz. When Hermann Göring learned of the decision he pressed Hitler to reverse it, which eventually happened but led to the creation of the Fliegerführer Atlantik in its place.

== January 7, 1941 (Tuesday) ==
- Japanese Admiral Isoroku Yamamoto presented Minister of the Navy Koshirō Oikawa with his ideas for a war against the United States in a memorandum titled Gumbi ni kansuru shiken (Views on Preparations for War). Yamamato proposed a crippling first strike on American forces in the first few hours of the war, something that could best be accomplished by an air attack on the U.S. fleet at Pearl Harbor.
- The New Fourth Army incident occurred in China when 80,000 forces of the Kuomintang attacked the Communist New Fourth Army in Maolin, Anhui Province, ending the co-operation of the two factions to fight the Japanese instead of each other.
- A special committee of the Canadian government recommended that Japanese Canadians not be allowed to volunteer for the armed forces on the grounds of strong public opinion against them.
- Born: Iona Brown, violinist and conductor, in Salisbury, England (d. 2004); John E. Walker, chemist and Nobel laureate, in Halifax, West Yorkshire, England

== January 8, 1941 (Wednesday) ==
- The Royal Air Force bombed Naples. Italian battleship Giulio Cesare was damaged during the raid and had to go north for repairs.
- Franco-Thai War: The Royal Thai Air Force attacked French positions at Siem Reap and Battambang.
- Born: Graham Chapman, comedian, writer, actor and member of the Monty Python comedy troupe, in Leicester, England (d. 1989)
- Died: Robert Baden-Powell, 1st Baron Baden-Powell, 83, British Army officer and founder of the Scout Movement

== January 9, 1941 (Thursday) ==
- Hitler held a conference with his generals to discuss plans to attack the Soviet Union. Hitler said that German success in Russia would encourage Japan to attack the United States, thus keeping the Americans too occupied to get involved in the war in Europe.
- The Avro Lancaster had its first flight.
- Born: Joan Baez, folk musician and activist, on Staten Island, New York

== January 10, 1941 (Friday) ==
- The British began Operation Excess, a series of supply convoys to Malta, Alexandria and Greece.
- The British aircraft carrier Illustrious was severely damaged by Stukas as it escorted a convoy to Malta.
- President Roosevelt submitted H.R. 1776, better known as the Lend-Lease bill, to Congress.
- The German civil administration in the Netherlands ordered the registration of all Jews in the country.
- The results of a Gallup poll were published asking Americans, "Which of these two things do you think it is more important for the United States to try to do — to keep out of the war ourselves, or to help England win, even at the risk of getting into the war?" 60% said help England, 40% said keep out. A separate question asked, "If you were asked to vote on the question of the United States entering the war against Germany and Italy, how would you vote — to go into the war, or to stay out of the war?" 88% said stay out, 12% said go in.
- Died: Frank Bridge, 61, English composer, violinist and conductor; John Lavery, 84, Irish painter; Joe Penner, 36, American comedian (heart failure)

== January 11, 1941 (Saturday) ==
- The Greeks completed the Capture of Klisura Pass.
- The British completed Operation Excess with all convoyed freighters reaching their destinations. However, the light cruiser HMS Southampton was bombed and sunk off Malta by the Luftwaffe.
- Hitler issued Directive No. 22, German Support for Battles in the Mediterranean Area.
- A 6.2 M_{w} earthquake in the Jazan Province of Saudi Arabia killed around 1,200.
- Born: Dave Edwards, big-band saxophonist, in Opelika, Alabama (d. 2000); Jimmy Velvit, rock and roll singer, in Coalgate, Oklahoma.
- Died: Emanuel Lasker, 72, German-born chess champion.

== January 12, 1941 (Sunday) ==
- British and Australian troops of XIII Corps surrounded the Italian-held strategic port of Tobruk and prepared an assault. Just a few months later the situation would be reversed in the 2nd Siege of Tobruk.
- The American luxury liner Manhattan ran aground north of Palm Beach, Florida with 750 people on board.
- The Constitution of the Moldavian SSR was adopted.
- Hermann Göring received the 15th-century Sterzinger Altar by Hans Multscher as a 48th birthday present from Benito Mussolini.
- Born: Long John Baldry, blues singer and voice actor, in East Haddon, Northamptonshire, England (d. 2005)

== January 13, 1941 (Monday) ==
- RAF bombers attacked Ostend, Belgium and the German submarine base at Lorient, France.
- The Luftwaffe bombed Plymouth and killed 26 people.
- Hitler met with Boris III of Bulgaria at the Berghof.
- The U.S. Supreme Court decided Sibbach v. Wilson & Co.
- Died: James Joyce, 58, Irish novelist and poet

== January 14, 1941 (Tuesday) ==
- Romanian Conducător Ion Antonescu met with Hitler at Obersalzberg, where it was agreed that Antonescu would liquidate the Iron Guard.
- British Commander-in-Chief Middle East Archibald Wavell met Greek Prime Minister Ioannis Metaxas and General Alexander Papagos in Athens. Papagos requested nine British divisions plus air support, but Wavell replied that he could only offer two or three. Papagos declined the offer.
- The British government announced new price controls to thwart food profiteering. Price freezes were announced for more than 20 food items including coffee, rice, biscuits and jelly.
- Former Belgian Justice Minister Victor de Laveleye suggested in a BBC radio broadcast that Belgians use a V sign as a symbol of resistance, since the French and Flemish words for "victory" both started with the letter V. Within weeks the "V for victory" sign began appearing on walls in Belgium, northern France and Holland.
- German auxiliary cruiser Pinguin captured 14 ships of a Norwegian whaling fleet in a single operation.
- In New York City, brothers Anthony and William Esposito held up a man in a Fifth Avenue office building, shot him dead and then led police in a daytime chase through Manhattan. Both men were eventually apprehended, but not before a police officer was slain and a cab driver wounded in the throat. The trial would become one of the most famous insanity defense cases in history.
- Born: Faye Dunaway, actress, in Bascom, Florida; Milan Kučan, 1st President of Slovenia, in Križevci, Gornji Petrovci, Kingdom of Yugoslavia

== January 15, 1941 (Wednesday) ==
- RAF bombers attacked Wilhelmshaven and Emden.
- Quartet for the End of Time by Olivier Messiaen was given its first performance in the POW camp Stalag VIII-A at Gorlitz, Germany (now Zgorzelec, Poland).
- German submarine U-554 was commissioned.
- Born: Captain Beefheart, born Don Glen Vliet, avant-garde musician and artist, in Glendale, California (d. 2010)

== January 16, 1941 (Thursday) ==
- The Germans bombed Malta for the first time, killing 50 people, destroying 200 buildings and damaging the capital city of Valletta. The British aircraft carrier HMS Illustrious was hit and damaged again in Grand Harbour.
- The British troopship Oropesa was sunk in the Western Approaches by the German submarine U-96.

== January 17, 1941 (Friday) ==
- The Battle of Ko Chang was fought in the Gulf of Thailand, resulting in Vichy French victory.
- The British troopship Almeda Star was sunk north of Rockall by U-96.
- Soviet Foreign Minister Vyacheslav Molotov warned Germany against deploying troops in Bulgaria by stating that the Soviet Union considered Bulgaria a security zone.
- 23,190 people packed Madison Square Garden to watch Fritzie Zivic successfully defend the world welterweight boxing title against Henry Armstrong. The attendance is an all-time record for any of the different versions of the Garden.
- Subhash Chandra Bose's arrest and subsequent release set the scene for his escape to Germany, via Afghanistan and the Soviet Union. A few days before his escape, he sought solitude and, on this pretext, avoided meeting British guards and grew a beard. Late night 16 January 1941, the night of his escape, he dressed as a Pathan (brown long coat, a black fez-type coat and broad pyjamas) to avoid being identified. Subhash Chandra Bose escaped from under British surveillance from his Elgin Road house in Calcutta on the night of 17 January 1941, accompanied by his nephew Sisir Kumar Bose, later reaching Gomoh Railway Station (now Netaji Subhas Chandra Bose Gomoh Station) in the then state of Bihar (now Jharkhand), India.
- Born: Manfred Schellscheidt, footballer and coach, in Söllingen, Germany

== January 18, 1941 (Saturday) ==
- The British destroyer HMS Castleton was damaged by German bombing while undergoing repairs at Portsmouth.
- A diplomatic incident occurred at the German consulate in San Francisco when the office displayed the Reich flag in recognition of the German national holiday (commemorating the anniversary of the country's unification in 1871). At noon the flag was hauled down and an angry crowd tore it to pieces.
- Born: David Ruffin, soul singer (The Temptations), in Whynot, Mississippi (d. 1991)

== January 19, 1941 (Sunday) ==
- The 4th and 5th Indian Division with units of the Sudan Defence Force under the command of General William Platt launched an attack on the Italians in Eritrea, Somaliland and Ethiopia, taking Kassala immediately.
- The exiled Emperor of Ethiopia Haile Selassie re-entered his country behind the advancing British and Commonwealth troops.
- Benito Mussolini met with Hitler at the Berghof for a two-day conference. It was agreed that Germany would help the Italians in North Africa but not on the Greco-Albanian front.
- The British battleship HMS Prince of Wales was commissioned.

== January 20, 1941 (Monday) ==
- Mussolini consented to German troops entering Italy.
- The third inauguration of Franklin D. Roosevelt was held in Washington, D.C.

== January 21, 1941 (Tuesday) ==
- The Legionnaires' rebellion and Bucharest pogrom began in Bucharest, Romania when members of the Iron Guard revolted.
- Bulgaria passed antisemitic legislation modeled after Germany's Nuremberg Laws.
- Home Secretary Herbert Morrison used Defence Regulation 2D to ban the Communist newspaper Daily Worker, on the grounds that it was attempting to hinder the British war effort.
- The United States lifted the trade embargo on the Soviet Union that had been imposed during the Winter War.
- Bob Feller signed a new contract with the Cleveland Indians for $30,000, the highest annual salary for any pitcher in history at the time.
- The heist film High Sierra starring Ida Lupino and Humphrey Bogart was released.
- Born: Plácido Domingo, tenor, in Madrid, Spain; Richie Havens, singer-songwriter and guitarist, in Brooklyn (d. 2013)

== January 22, 1941 (Wednesday) ==
- British and Australian forces captured Tobruk and took 25,000 Italians prisoner.
- Wendell Willkie departed the United States aboard a transatlantic flight for a "fact finding" mission in Britain.
- German submarine U-67 was commissioned.
- The Andrews Sisters recorded "Boogie Woogie Bugle Boy".

== January 23, 1941 (Thursday) ==
- The Legionnaires' rebellion was put down in Romania.
- Charles Lindbergh came before the U.S. House Foreign Affairs Committee to oppose the Roosevelt Administration's Lend-Lease bill. Lindbergh testified that he would prefer to see "neither side win" in the war and hoped to see a "negotiated peace," and also expressed his belief that American entry into the war on Britain's side would still not be enough to defeat Germany without some kind of internal collapse.

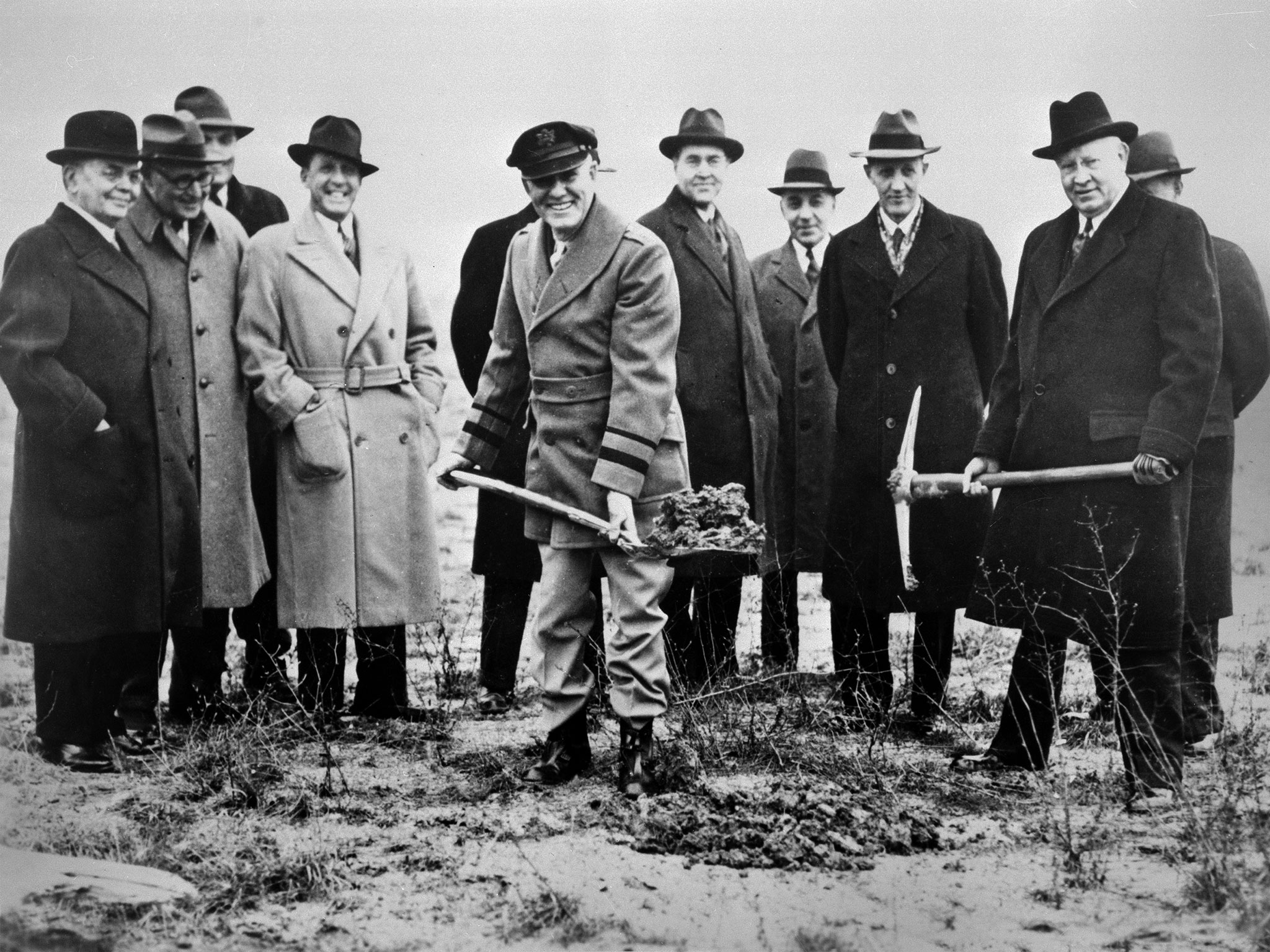
January 23, 1941: Ground is broken for the NACA's Aircraft Engine Research Laboratory.

- The groundbreaking ceremony for the National Advisory Committee for Aeronautics' new Aircraft Engine Research Laboratory (now NASA's John H. Glenn Research Center at Lewis Field) took place in Cleveland, Ohio.
- The stage musical Lady in the Dark with music by Kurt Weill, lyrics by Ira Gershwin and book and direction by Moss Hart premiered at the Alvin Theatre on Broadway.

== January 24, 1941 (Friday) ==
- Thai bombers raided the French airbase at Angkor.
- U.S. Secretary of the Navy Frank Knox sent Secretary of War Henry L. Stimson a letter warning of the possibility of a surprise Japanese attack on Pearl Harbor.
- Born: Neil Diamond, US singer-songwriter, in Brooklyn, New York; Dan Shechtman, Israeli scientist and Nobel laureate, in Tel Aviv

== January 25, 1941 (Saturday) ==
- Panjiayu massacre: The Imperial Japanese Army conducted a massacre of the Chinese village of Panjiayu, Hebei, in accordance with the orders from General Yasuji Okamura that all Chinese villages suspected of harboring communist guerilla fighters were to be wiped out.
- William C. Bullitt told the House Foreign Affairs Committee that invasion of the Western Hemisphere by the Axis powers would be almost certain if the British Navy was eliminated and the Panama Canal blockaded before the United States was prepared. Bullitt said that "for our own self-preservation" the United States should ensure that Britain was not defeated.
- German submarine U-201 was commissioned.

== January 26, 1941 (Sunday) ==
- Allied troops captured Derna, Libya.
- Wendell Willkie arrived in London.
- Died: Oscar Loew, 96, German agricultural chemist

== January 27, 1941 (Monday) ==
- A report circulated claiming that the converted troopship RMS Empress of Australia had been torpedoed and was sinking 200 miles off Dakar.
- Allied shipping docked in the harbor of Tobruk for the first time.
- A conference on economic co-operation between the countries of South America opened in Montevideo. The conference lasted until February 6.
- Constitutional Act No. 7 was passed in Vichy France, requiring state secretaries, high dignitaries and high officials to swear allegiance to the Chief of State. Article 3 stated that if any of them should prove "unfaithful to his obligations", the Chief of State was empowered to impose penalties that included loss of political rights and detention in a fortress.
- Born: Beatrice Tinsley, English-born New Zealand astronomer and cosmologist, in Chester (d. 1981)

== January 28, 1941 (Tuesday) ==
- British naval authorities made a terse announcement maintaining that the Empress of Australia was "safe in port".
- The British steamer Urla was sunk by the Italian submarine Luigi Torelli 250 miles (400 km) west of Ireland; all 42 crew survived.

== January 29, 1941 (Wednesday) ==
- The Battle of Trebeshina began in southeastern Albania.
- Alexandros Koryzis became Prime Minister of Greece upon the death of Ioannis Metaxas.
- The U.S.–British Staff Conference (ABC–1) began in Washington, D.C., in which U.S. and British military staff members worked to co-ordinate a general plan in the event of U.S. entry into the war.
- Franz Schlegelberger became the German Minister of Justice upon the death of Franz Gürtner.
- Died: Ioannis Metaxas, 69, Prime Minister of Greece

== January 30, 1941 (Thursday) ==
- Hitler gave a speech before 18,000 people at the Berlin Sportpalast on the eighth anniversary of the Nazis' coming to power. Hitler declared that any ship carrying aid to England within the range of German U-boats would be torpedoed, and also warned the United States that if anyone on the American continent tried to interfere in the European conflict, Germany's war aims would quickly change.
- The Battle of South Henan began.
- Friedrich Flick and Albert Vögler were among the recipients of the War Merit Cross.
- The Front Flying Clasp of the Luftwaffe was established.
- German submarine U-555 was established.
- Born: Dick Cheney, 46th Vice President of the United States, in Lincoln, Nebraska (d. 2025); Tineke Lagerberg, Olympic swimmer, in Bussum, Netherlands

== January 31, 1941 (Friday) ==
- The battle known as the Capture of Kufra began in Libya.
- The Japanese government arranged a truce in the Franco-Thai War aboard the Japanese cruiser Natori.
- Joe Louis retained the World Heavyweight Boxing Championship with a fifth-round knockout of Red Burman at Madison Square Garden.
- German submarine U-751 was commissioned.
- The service comedy film Buck Privates starring Abbott and Costello was released.
- Born: Eugène Terre'Blanche, politician, in Ventersdorp, South Africa (d. 2010)
