= Ah Yeah =

Ah Yeah may refer to:

== Music ==
=== Albums ===
- Ah Yeah (EP), a 2015 EP by South Korean girl group EXID

=== Songs ===
- "Ah Yeah", song by K-pop girl group EXID from their extended play of the same title
- "Ah Yeah!", song by Australian producer and DJ Will Sparks
- "Ah Yeah!!", song by Japanese jazz fusion duo Sukima Switch
- "Ah-Yeah", song by American rapper KRS-One from his eponymous studio album

== See also ==
- Oh Yeah (disambiguation)
