= The Diamonds =

Canadian pop group

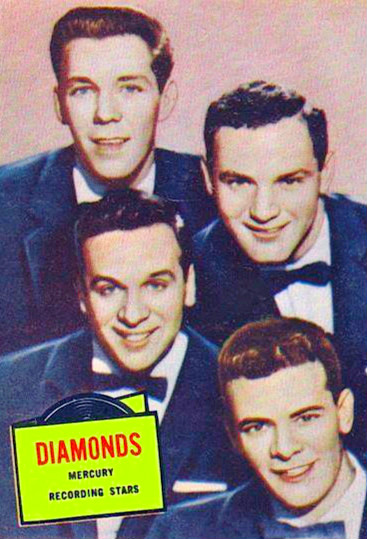
- The Diamonds in 1957

Background information
- Origin: Canada
- Genres: Traditional pop
- Years active: 1953–present
- Label: Mercury
- Members: Gary Owens; Julian McCleary; Daniel Peter Vissers; Jeff Dolan
- Past members: Dave Somerville; Michael Lawrence; Adam Marino; Ted Kowalski; Phil Levitt; Bill Reed; Bill New; Bob Duncan; Glenn Stetson; Mike Douglas; John Felten; Jim Malone; Sean Sooter; Jerry Siggins; Bobby Poynton; Evan Fisher; Steve Smith; Gary Cech; Harry Harding; Danny Rankin; Joe Derise; Jerry Honeycutt; John Wagner; Ron Neuman; Don Wade; Jim Blaine; Mike Dorsey; Don Weir; Joe Finetti; Marty Davis
- Website: www.thediamonds.live

The Diamonds are a Canadian vocal quartet that rose to prominence in the 1950s and early 1960s with 16 Billboard hit records. The original members were Dave Somerville (lead), Ted Kowalski (tenor), Phil Levitt (baritone), and Bill Reed (bass). They were most noted for interpreting and introducing rhythm and blues vocal group music to the wider pop music audience.

== History ==
=== 1950s ===
In 1953, Dave Somerville, while working as a sound engineer for the Canadian Broadcasting Corporation in Toronto, Ontario, Canada, met three other young singers. They decided to form a stand-up quartet called the Diamonds. The group's first performance was in the basement of St. Thomas Aquinas Church in Toronto, singing in a Christmas minstrel show. The audience's reaction to the Somerville-led group was so positive that they decided that night they would turn professional.

After 18 months of rehearsal, they drove to New York City and tied for first place on Arthur Godfrey's Talent Scouts. The prize of being guest artist for a week on Godfrey's show led to a recording contract with Coral Records. Professional musician Nat Goodman became their manager. Coral released four songs, the most notable being "Black Denim Trousers and Motorcycle Boots", written by Jerry Leiber and Mike Stoller.

The next big step was an audition with Cleveland, Ohio, radio disc jockey, Bill Randle, who had aided in the success of some popular groups, such as the Crew-Cuts. Randle was impressed with the Diamonds and introduced them to a producer at Mercury Records, which signed the group to a recording contract.

The Diamonds' first recording for Mercury was "Why Do Fools Fall in Love" (originated by Frankie Lymon and the Teenagers), which reached number 12 in the U.S. as their first hit, and their follow-up hit single, "The Church Bells May Ring" (originally by the Willows), reached number 14 in the U.S.

The Diamonds' biggest hits were 1957's "Little Darlin'" (originally recorded by the Gladiolas, written by Maurice Williams) and "The Stroll" (1957), an original song written for the group by Clyde Otis, from an idea by Dick Clark.

Although they were signed to do rock and roll, Mercury also paired them with jazz composer and arranger Pete Rugolo, in one of his Meet series recordings. The album, entitled The Diamonds Meet Pete Rugolo, allowed them to return to their roots and do some established standards.

The group sang "Little Darlin'" and "Where Mary Go" in the film The Big Beat. They sang the theme song to the 1958 film, Kathy O'.

Their television appearances included the TV shows of Steve Allen, Perry Como, Vic Damone, Tony Bennett, Eddy Arnold, and Paul Winchell. They also appeared on American Bandstand.

In the late 1950s, Reed, Kowalski, and Levitt left the group and were replaced by Mike Douglas, John Felten, and Evan Fisher.

=== 1960s, '70s, and '80s ===
Despite the ever-changing style of rock and roll and their Mercury contract expiring, the Diamonds continued touring the country. After Dave Somerville left the group in 1961 to pursue a folk singing career as "David Troy", he was replaced by Jim Malone. No more records by the Diamonds were hits after Somerville left.

Throughout the 1960s and '70s, the Diamonds performed mostly in Las Vegas, led at first by Mike Douglas, and later being continued by Glenn Stetson. At one time, at least two groups were performing under the Diamonds name, the other principally being led by John Felten until his death on May 17, 1982, in a plane crash. This created an issue in the late '80s that ultimately went to court. The right to the use of the name "The Diamonds" was awarded to Gary Owens (a member of Felten's group) with the original members being allowed to use their name on special occasions each year. Owens, along with members Bob Duncan, Steve Smith (both former members of Lawrence Welk's band and television program), and Gary Cech, released an album in 1987, Diamonds Are Forever, which contained two songs that entered the lower reaches of the country music charts, "Just a Little Bit" and "Two Kinds of Women".

In 1986, Glenn Stetson and Dick Malono opened up Little Darlin's Rock and Roll Palace near Disney in Orlando, Florida, which was a magical success for all the acts of that era to perform. The Country Music Network also starting videos of the groups that went on the TV network. In 1983, the Diamonds with Glenn Stetson were the first rock-and-roll group to go on the Country Music Network on a show called Nashville Now with Ralph Emory.

=== 2000s and beyond ===
The Diamonds received national attention once again in 2000, when the original members were invited to sing in TJ Lubinsky’s PBS production of Doo-Wop 51, and again in the PBS production entitled Magic Moments - The Best of '50s Pop in 2004.

Stetson received a heart transplant in 2000, and died in 2003. Original member Kowalski died on August 8, 2010, from heart disease, at the age of 79.

In 2012, the Diamonds were listed as guest stars with the Fabulous Palm Springs Follies at the Plaza Theatre in Palm Springs, California.

Douglas died in a car accident on July 2, 2012, at age 78.

Somerville died on July 14, 2015, in Santa Barbara, California.

The Diamonds continue to tour to this day with the line-up of Gary Owens (baritone), Dan Vissers (tenor), Julian McCleary (lead), and Jeff Dolan (bass), although none of the members are from the original group who recorded for Mercury Records.

== Original members ==
- Dave Somerville – lead (died 2015), replaced by Jim Malone in 1961
- Ted Kowalski – tenor (died 2010), replaced by Evan Fisher in 1958
- Phil Levitt – baritone, replaced by Mike Douglas in 1957
- Bill Reed – bass (died 2004), replaced by John Felten in 1958 (died 1982), replaced by Gary Cech until 1992 (voluntarily left the group)

== Replacement members ==
- Glenn Stetson, lead vocalist, replaced John Felten in 1968. Mike Douglas remained with the group as the only original member who recorded for Mercury in the 1950s and early '60s. At this time, the Diamonds consisted of Glenn Stetson (Canada), Harry Harding (Canada), Danny Rankin (USA), and Mike Douglas (Canada).
- Joe Derise, vocalist and composer, joined in 1969.
- Jerry Honeycutt was with John Felten during the mid-1970s, until Felten's death.
- Steve Smith, of The Lawrence Welk Show fame, has been with the Diamonds since 1982.
- John Wagner, singing tenor and playing tenor sax, joined Glen Stetson in 1983 and was with Stetson until 2003, when Stetson died. The Diamonds continued to perform until Stetson's death. The group that evolved when Somerville left the Diamonds in 1961 and Mike Douglas continued the group is the same group that Stetson kept going until his death in 2003. The historical continuation that began in 1968 ended with Stetson's death.
- Mike Douglas and Joe Derise rejoined the Diamonds in 1988. Derise eventually died and Mike Douglas (one of the original singers from the group's Mercury days) died in 2012.
- Bob Duncan, tenor, began singing with John Felten in 1979.
- Gary Owens, baritone, joined John Felten in 1975. He sings, plays saxophone and flute, and does most of the vocal arranging for the group.
- Gary Cech, bass, began singing with Bob Duncan in 1982 shortly after John Felten's death and left the group in 1992.
- Jerry Siggins sang bass.
- Carson Church, bass, joined the Diamonds from 2001-2003.

Contrary to a popular myth, the father of Tom Hanks was never a member of the group.

== Discography ==
=== Original albums ===
- The Diamonds (1957)
- America's Number One Singing Stylists (1957)
- The Diamonds Meet Pete Rugolo (Mercury, 1958) (with Pete Rugolo)
- America's Favorite Song Stylists (1959)
- Songs from the Old West (1959)
- Pop Hits (1960)
- Diamonds Are Forever (1987)

=== Compilation albums ===
- Little Darlin' (1981)
- The Best of The Diamonds: The Mercury Years (1996)
- The Diamonds Songbook (2007)
- The Stroll – 2 CD Set (2011)
- The Diamonds – 4 Classic Albums Plus (2015)

=== Singles ===
Year	Titles (A-side, B-side) Both sides from same album except where indicated	Chart positions				Album
Year	Titles (A-side, B-side) Both sides from same album except where indicated	US Pop	US Cashbox	US R&B	UK	Album
1955	"Black Denim Trousers and Motorcycle Boots" b/w "Nip Sip"	—	—	—	—	Non-album tracks
1956	"Smooch Me" b/w "Be My Lovin' Baby"	—	—	—	—	Non-album tracks
1956	"Why Do Fools Fall in Love" b/w "You Baby You" (from America's Favorite Song Stylists)	12	2	—	—	Collection of Golden Hits (Mercury various artists compilation)
1956	"The Church Bells May Ring" b/w "Little Girl of Mine" (from Pop Hits)	14	23	—	—	Collection of Golden Hits (Mercury various artists compilation)
1956	"Love, Love, Love" b/w "Every Night About This Time" (from America's Favorite Song Stylists)	30	—	14	—	Collection of Golden Hits (Mercury various artists compilation)
1956	"Soft Summer Breeze" /	34	—	—	—	Non-album track
1956	"Ka-Ding-Dong"	35	17	8	—	America's Favorite Song Stylists
1956	"My Judge and My Jury" b/w "Put Your House in Order"	—	—	—	—	Non-album tracks
1956	"A Thousand Miles Away" b/w "Every Minute of the Day"	—	—	—	—	America's Favorite Song Stylists
1957	"Little Darlin'" b/w "Faithful and True"	2	2	2	3	America's Favorite Song Stylists
1957	"Words of Love" b/w "Don't Say Goodbye"	13	47	12	—	Pop Hits
1957	"Zip Zip" b/w "Oh How I Wish"	16	36	12	—	The Diamonds
1957	"Silhouettes" b/w "Honey Bird"	10	—	6	—	America's Favorite Song Stylists
1957	"The Stroll" b/w "Land of Beauty" (from Pop Hits)	4	1	5	—	America's Favorite Song Stylists
1958	"High Sign" b/w "Chick-Lets (Don't Let Me Down)"	37	21	—	—	Pop Hits
1958	"Kathy-O" /	16	37	—	—	Non-album tracks
1958	"Happy Years"	73	—	—	—	Non-album tracks
1958	"Walking Along" b/w "Eternal Lovers" (from Pop Hits)	29	19	—	—	Non-album tracks
1959	"She Say (Oom Dooby Doom)" b/w "From the Bottom of My Heart"	18	12	—	—	Non-album tracks
1959	"Gretchen" b/w "A Mother's Love"	—	95	—	—	Non-album tracks
1959	"Sneaky Alligator" b/w "Holding Your Hand"	—	—	—	—	Non-album tracks
1959	"Young in Years" b/w "The Twenty-Second Day"	—	80	—	—	Non-album tracks
1959	"Walkin' the Stroll" b/w "Batman, Wolfman, Frankenstein or Dracula"	—	—	—	—	Non-album tracks
1960	"Tell the Truth" b/w "Real True Love"	—	—	—	—	Non-album tracks
1960	"Slave Girl" b/w "The Pencil Song"	—	—	—	—	Non-album tracks
1960	"You'd Be Mine" b/w "The Crumble"	—	—	—	—	Non-album tracks
1961	"You Short Changed Me" b/w "I Sho' Lawd Will"	—	—	—	—	Non-album tracks
1961	"The Munch" b/w "Woomai-Ling"	—	—	—	—	Non-album tracks
1961	"One Summer Night" b/w "It's a Doggone Shame"	22	43	—	—	Non-album tracks
1962	"The Horizontal Lieutenant" b/w "Vanishing American"	—	—	—	—	Non-album tracks
1963	"The Slide" b/w "Melody of Love"	—	—	—	—	Non-album tracks
"—" denotes releases that did not chart or were not released in that territory.

== Film appearances ==
- The Big Beat (1958)

== TV appearances ==
- The Eddy Arnold Show (1956)
- The Steve Allen Show (1957)
- The Dick Clark Beech Nut Show (1959)

== Awards and honours ==
- In 1984, the Canadian Juno "Hall of Fame" award by the Canadian Academy of Recording Arts and Sciences.
- In October 2004, inducted into the Vocal Group Hall of Fame in Sharon, Pennsylvania.
- In 2006 inducted into the Doo-Wop Hall of Fame.

== See also ==
- Canadian rock
- Music of Canada
