= Maurice Williams and the Zodiacs =

American vocal group

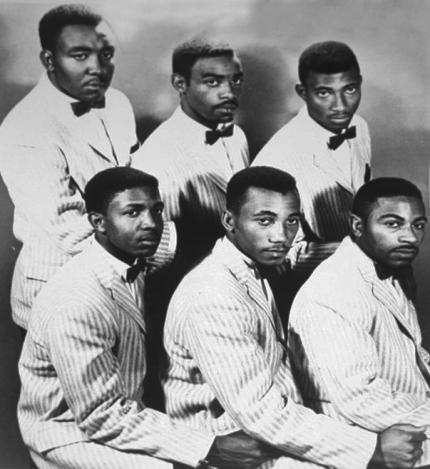
- Williams (front, center) and the Zodiacs in 1960

Background information
- Origin: Nashville, Tennessee, USA
- Genres: Doo-wop
- Labels: Herald, Vee Jay, Excello (The Gladiolas)
- Past members: Maurice Williams (deceased); Henry Gaston (deceased); Wiley Bennett; Charles Thomas; Albert Hill (deceased); Willie Morrow; Earl Gainey (deceased)

Maurice Williams and the Zodiacs were an American doo-wop/R&B vocal group in the late 1950s and early 1960s. Originally the (Royal) Charms, the band changed its name to the Gladiolas in 1957 and the Excellos in 1958, before finally settling on the Zodiacs in 1959.

== Early history ==
Maurice Williams was born on April 26, 1938, in Lancaster, South Carolina. His first experience with music was in the church, where his mother and sister both performed. By the time he was six, Williams was performing regularly there. With his childhood friend Earl Gainey, Williams formed the gospel group the Junior Harmonizers. As rock and roll and doo-wop became their primary interest, the Junior Harmonizers changed their name to the Royal Charms.

== The Royal Charms and the Gladiolas ==
In addition to Williams and Gainey, the Royal Charms were made up of Willie Jones (baritone), William Massey (tenor, baritone, trumpet), and Norman Wade (bass). In the winter of 1956, while still in high school, Williams and his band traveled to Nashville, Tennessee, to record for the Excello label. At the time they were going by the name the Royal Charms, but the founder of Excello Records, Ernie Young, convinced them to change their name to the Gladiolas (at the time, there were at least two other bands using the same name).

The song "Little Darlin'" was a No. 11 hit on the Billboard R&B chart in 1957, but only reached number 41 on Billboard's Top 100. However, when it was covered by the Canadian group the Diamonds, it moved up to No. 2.

== The Zodiacs ==
Williams finished high school and while on the road with the band, their station wagon broke down in Bluefield, West Virginia. The band came across a British-built Ford car known as the Zodiac and changed their name based on this. Shortly thereafter, Henry Gaston replaced Earl Gainey.

In the spring of 1959, Maurice Williams and the Zodiacs performed at the University of South Carolina in Columbia, South Carolina. Around that time, the group split and reformed. The members were Williams, Gaston, Wiley Bennett, and Charles Thomas. Later, Little Willie Morrow and Albert Hill were added. One month later, in the early summer of 1959, the band recorded in a Quonset Hut on Shakespeare Road in Columbia. The recording engineer, Homer Fesperman, recorded several tracks that the band had hoped would include a hit. One of the last tracks that they recorded that day was "Stay", a song that Williams had written in 1953. Williams sang lead and Henry Gaston sang the counter-verse falsetto.

After taking the demo of "Stay" to Al Silver at Herald Records in New York City, the song was pressed and released in early 1960. At 1:36, "Stay" is the shortest recording ever to reach number one on the Billboard Hot 100 chart in the United States.

At the end of 1963, the British band the Hollies recorded "Stay", which gave the group their debut Top Ten hit single in the UK, peaking at No.8 in January 1964, three years after the Zodiacs' version had peaked at No. 14 on the UK Singles Chart (January 1961). Later versions of "Stay", by the Four Seasons (1963) and Jackson Browne (1978), reached the Top 20 in the U.S., each selling over one million copies in the United States alone. The inclusion of the Zodiacs' "Stay" on the soundtrack to the film Dirty Dancing in 1987 led to the song selling more records than it had during its original release.

A 1965 recording by the group, "May I", released by Vee Jay Records and Dee-Su Records, became, over the years, another million-selling record.

== Later life ==
Williams continued to record, tour, and release music until his death. He was inducted into the North Carolina Music Hall of Fame in 2010. He also made several performances for the PBS "Doo Wop 50" show series in 2001.

Henry Gaston died on August 24, 2015, at the age of 79. Maurice Williams died on August 6, 2024, at the age of 86. Earl Gainey died on February 4, 2025, at the age of 87.

== Discography ==
=== Albums ===
- 1961 Stay
- 1965 At the Beach- Live in '65
- 1997 Let This Night Last, produced and arranged by Ron Oates
- 2000 The 21-song album, Back To Basics, was produced and arranged by Ron Oates in Nashville, Tennessee. It contains re-recorded versions of "Stay" and "Little Darlin".

=== Singles ===
Year	Title	Peak chart positions			Record Label	B-side	Album
Year	Title	US Pop	US R&B	UK	Record Label	B-side	Album
1959	"College Girl"	—	—	—	Selwyn	"Say Yeah"	
1959	"Lover (Where Are You)"	—	—	—	Cole	"She's Mine"	
1960	"Stay"	1	3	14	Herald	"Do You Believe"	Stay
1960	"I Remember"	86	—	—	Herald	"Always"	Stay
1961	"Come Along"	83	—	—	Herald	"Do I"	Stay
1961	"Come and Get It"	—	—	—	Herald	"Some Day"	
1961	"High Blood Pressure"	—	—	—	Herald	"Please"	
1965	"So Fine"	—	—	—	Sphere Sound	"The Winds"	Stay
1968	"The Four Corners"	—	—	—	Veep	"My Reason for Livin'"	
1970	"I'd Rather Have a Memory Than a Dream"	—	—	—	440/Plus	"Try"	
1990	"Sweetheart, Please Don't Go"	—	—	—	Ripete	"Let’s Do It Again"	

== See also ==
- List of doo-wop musicians
- List of artists who reached number one in the United States
- Vocal Group Hall of Fame
- List of 1960s one-hit wonders in the United States
- List of people from South Carolina
