= Ripete Records =

American independent record label

Ripete Records is a small, independently distributed record label specializing in the reissue of Carolina Beach Music compilations for shag dance enthusiasts, mainly in the Southeastern US, as well as providing an outlet for newer recordings by R&B artists, such as The Drifters, The Clovers, and Maurice Williams and the Zodiacs. In addition to local Beach Music classics, the label's compilation collections often include a smattering of nationally-known R&B classics from the mid-1950s through the early 1980s, especially those with swing-style back-beats suitable for the Carolina shag style of dancing. Ripete Records was founded by Marion Carter and Pete Smolen in 1979.

Pete Smolen died of cancer on the 2nd of August 2023.

Ripete is based far from any large city, in the quiet rural farming community of Bishopville, South Carolina, in 2150 Elliott Hwy.

== See also ==
- List of record labels
- The Spongetones
- The Clovers
- Grayson Hugh
