= December 1940 =

Month of 1940

| << | December 1940 | | | | | >> |
| Su | Mo | Tu | We | Th | Fr | Sa |
| 1 | 2 | 3 | 4 | 5 | 6 | 7 |
| 8 | 9 | 10 | 11 | 12 | 13 | 14 |
| 15 | 16 | 17 | 18 | 19 | 20 | 21 |
| 22 | 23 | 24 | 25 | 26 | 27 | 28 |
| 29 | 30 | 31 |

The following events occurred in December 1940:

== December 1, 1940 (Sunday) ==
- Greek troops captured Pogradec.
- The last of the three worst nights of the Southampton Blitz occurred.
- Manuel Ávila Camacho became 45th President of Mexico.
- Allied convoy HX 90 was sighted by German submarine U-101. The Germans would sink a total of 11 ships from the convoy from this day through December 3.
- Born: Richard Pryor, stand-up comedian and actor, in Peoria, Illinois (d. 2005)

== December 2, 1940 (Monday) ==
- The British armed merchant cruiser Forfar was sunk west of Scotland by the German submarine U-99.
- The cargo ship Wihelmina was torpedoed and sunk in the North Atlantic by the German submarine U-94.
- Died: Nikolai Koltsov, 68, Russian biologist; Bernard Revel, 55, Lithuanian-American Orthodox rabbi and scholar

== December 3, 1940 (Tuesday) ==
- The Greeks captured Sarandë from the Italians.
- Died: Wolff von Stutterheim, 47, German Generalmajor (died of wounds sustained during Battle of France)

== December 4, 1940 (Wednesday) ==
- The Greeks took Përmet and captured 500 Italians.
- The swashbuckler film The Son of Monte Cristo starring Louis Hayward and Joan Bennett premiered at the Capitol Theatre in New York City.
- Born: Gary Gilmore, murderer, in McCamey, Texas (d. 1977)

== December 5, 1940 (Thursday) ==
- The Hundred Regiments Offensive ended in Chinese victory.
- The Greek II Army Corps broke into Albania.
- German submarine U-109 was commissioned.
- The fantasy film The Thief of Bagdad was released.
- Born: Peter Pohl, German-born Swedish author and short film director and screenwriter, in Hamburg
- Died: Jan Kubelík, 60, Czech violinist and composer

== December 6, 1940 (Friday) ==
- Field Marshal Pietro Badoglio was scapegoated for the Italian military reverses in Greece and made to resign as Chief of Staff of the Italian Army. He was replaced by Ugo Cavallero.
- Benito Mussolini called Dino Alfieri, the Italian ambassador to Berlin, and told him to request any immediate help the Germans could provide. Alfieri met with Joachim von Ribbentrop, who gave him a stern lecture about the Italian government ignoring Hitler's warning not to attack Greece.
- The Greeks occupied Sarandë.
- British submarine HMS Regulus was lost near Taranto, probably to a naval mine.
- The comedy film Go West starring the Marx Brothers was released.

== December 7, 1940 (Saturday) ==
- Ambassador Alfieri met with Adolf Hitler, who gave him a second lecture against Italy attacking Greece. Hitler said that Mussolini should resort to mobile courts-martial and executions if he wanted to turn the situation around. Hitler did agree to authorize fifty heavy troop transport planes to move fresh units from Italy to Albania.
- The British Fairey Barracuda dive bomber plane had its first test flight.
- The Ottawa Rough Riders defeated the Toronto Balmy Beach Beachers 12-5 in the second of the two-game series for the 28th Grey Cup of Canadian football.
- Born: Gerry Cheevers, ice hockey player, in St. Catharines, Ontario, Canada

== December 8, 1940 (Sunday) ==
- The Greeks occupied Gjirokastër and Delvinë.
- Domenico Cavagnari resigned as Chief of Staff of the Italian Navy and was replaced by Arturo Riccardi.
- The British passenger and cargo steamship Calabria was torpedoed and sunk by the German submarine U-103 off County Galway, Ireland.
- The Chicago Bears beat the Washington Redskins 73-0 in the NFL Championship Game at Griffith Stadium in Washington, D.C. It remains the most lopsided victory in NFL history.

== December 9, 1940 (Monday) ==
- The Allies began Operation Compass in North Africa.
- German submarines U-75 and U-76 were commissioned.
- John Philip Sousa Bridge opened in Washington, D.C.
- Died: Pietro Maletti, 60, Italian military officer (killed in action in North Africa)

== December 10, 1940 (Tuesday) ==
- The Battle of Sidi Barrani began as British forces launched an offensive to retake the Egyptian port of Sidi Barrani.
- Hitler issued Directive No. 19 on the German occupation of Vichy France, codenamed Operation Attila.
- Hitler made a speech to munitions workers in Berlin.
- The 1941 NFL draft was held. The Chicago Bears selected Tom Harmon of the University of Michigan as the number one overall pick.
- Died: John Rathbone, 30, British politician and fighter pilot (killed in action)

== December 11, 1940 (Wednesday) ==
- The Battle of Sidi Barrani ended in British victory.
- German submarine U-147 was commissioned.
- Born: Donna Mills, actress and producer, in Chicago, Illinois
- Died: J. Harold Murray, 49, American baritone

== December 12, 1940 (Thursday) ==
- The first of four nights of heavy German bombing of Sheffield, England known as the Sheffield Blitz began.
- In Belgrade, the foreign ministers of Hungary and Yugoslavia signed a treaty of "eternal friendship" between the two countries.
- Born: Sharad Pawar, politician, in Pune, Maharashtra, British India; Dionne Warwick, singer, actress and television show host, in East Orange, New Jersey
- Died: Philip Kerr, 11th Marquess of Lothian, 58, British politician, diplomat and newspaper editor

== December 13, 1940 (Friday) ==
- The Battle of Himara began.
- Hitler issued Directive No. 20 on the German invasion of Greece, codenamed Operation Marita.
- Pierre Laval was dismissed from Philippe Pétain's cabinet and placed under house arrest.

== December 14, 1940 (Saturday) ==
- Plutonium was first isolated and produced at the University of California, Berkeley.
- German submarine U-71 was commissioned.
- Died: Anton Korošec, 68, 10th Prime Minister of Yugoslavia

== December 15, 1940 (Sunday) ==
- The ashes of Napoleon II were brought from Vienna to Paris, exactly one hundred years to the day since the retour des cendres when Napoleon Bonaparte's repatriated remains were interred at Les Invalides. The move was meant as a gesture of reconciliation on the part of Hitler, but a popular joke among the French went that the Parisians would have preferred coal to ashes.
- Born: Barbara Valentin, actress, in Vienna (d. 2002)

== December 16, 1940 (Monday) ==
- Bombing of Mannheim: The first area bombardment of a German city was conducted by the Royal Air Force when 134 bombers attacked Mannheim during the night, starting large fires on both banks of the Rhine.
- Died: Eugène Dubois, 82, Dutch paleoanthropologist; Billy Hamilton, 74, American baseball player

== December 17, 1940 (Tuesday) ==
- The British captured Fort Capuzzo and Sallum near the Egypt-Libya border.
- The British destroyer Acheron sank after hitting a mine off the Isle of Wight.
- U.S. President Franklin D. Roosevelt gave a press conference in which he suggested leasing or selling of arms to Britain "on the general theory that it may still prove true that the best defense of Great Britain is the best defense of the United States, and therefore that these materials would be more useful to the defense of the United States if they were used in Great Britain, than if they were kept in storage here."
- Dorothy O'Grady was sentenced to death in England for spying. Her appeal would reduce the sentence to 14 years in prison.
- The Yugoslav steamship Srebreno, sailing from Dubrovnik to Mersin, struck the Kalafat Reef southeast of Luštica around 04:30 local time; all 35 crew members, including the captain Božo Derikosa, were eventually rescued, while the ship broke in half and sank.

== December 18, 1940 (Wednesday) ==
- Hitler issued Directive No. 21 on the German invasion of the Soviet Union, codenamed Operation Barbarossa.

== December 19, 1940 (Thursday) ==
- German submarine U-37 mistakenly torpedoed and sank the Vichy French submarine Sfax and support ship Rhône off the coast of Morocco. The U-boat captain chose not to record this incident on the ship's logs.
- German submarine U-111 was commissioned.
- US President Franklin D. Roosevelt approved $25 million in aid to the Republic of China, allowing the Nationalist government to buy one hundred P 40 pursuit aircraft.
- Born: Phil Ochs, protest singer, in El Paso, Texas (d. 1976)
- Died: Hendrik Christian Andersen, 68, Norwegian-born American sculptor, painter and urban planner; Kyösti Kallio, 67, 4th President of Finland

== December 20, 1940 (Friday) ==
- Liverpool Blitz: The first of three consecutive nights of bombing referred to as the Christmas blitz took place.
- Two Spitfire fighters of No. 66 Squadron RAF attacked Le Touquet in France, strafing targets of opportunity such as power transformers. This tactic, codenamed Rhubarb, marked a shift in RAF tactics to a more offensive role.
- The first of the two New Hampshire earthquakes struck.
- Issue #1 of Captain America Comics (cover date March) was published, marking the first appearances of Captain America, Bucky and the Red Skull.
- Born: Pat Chapman, food writer, broadcaster and author, in London, England (d. 2022)

== December 21, 1940 (Saturday) ==
- The RAF bombed docks and oil tanks at Porto Marghera, Italy.
- "Frenesí" by Artie Shaw topped the Billboard singles chart.
- Born: Frank Zappa, musician and composer, in Baltimore, Maryland (d. 1993)
- Died: F. Scott Fitzgerald, 44, American author (heart attack)

== December 22, 1940 (Sunday) ==
- The Battle of Himara ended in Greek victory.
- The heaviest raids of the Manchester Blitz began. Over the next two days a total of 654 people were killed and over 2,000 injured.
- Anthony Eden became UK Secretary of State for Foreign Affairs for the second time.
- Died: Nathanael West, 37, American author, screenwriter and satirist (traffic collision)

== December 23, 1940 (Monday) ==
- Winston Churchill broadcast an appeal to the people of Italy, telling them to overthrow Mussolini for bringing them into a war against their wishes. "Surely the Italian army, which has fought so bravely on many occasions in the past but now evidently has no heart for the job, should take some care of the life and future of Italy?" Churchill asked. It is unlikely that many Italians heard the speech since they were forbidden from listening to foreign broadcasts.
- Born:
  - Jorma Kaukonen, guitarist, in Washington, D.C.
  - Robert Labine, politician, in Gatineau, Quebec, Canada (d. 2021)
- Died: Eddie August Schneider, 29, American aviator (plane crash)

== December 24, 1940 (Tuesday) ==
- The Canadian Corps became effective in the United Kingdom.
- An unofficial two-day Christmas truce began in the aerial war between Britain and Germany.
- The second of the two New Hampshire earthquakes struck.
- Mahatma Gandhi wrote his second letter to Hitler, addressing him as "Dear Friend" and appealing to him "in the name of humanity to stop the war. You will lose nothing by referring all the matters of dispute between you and Great Britain to an international tribunal of your joint choice. If you attain success in the war, it will not prove that you were in the right. It will only prove that your power of destruction was greater. Whereas an award by an impartial tribunal will show as far as it is humanly possible which party was in the right."
- Born: Janet Carroll, actress, in Chicago, Illinois (d. 2012); Anthony S. Fauci, American immunologist, in Brooklyn, New York
- Died: Billy Hill, 41, American songwriter

== December 25, 1940 (Wednesday) ==
- Near Beauvais, Adolf Hitler met with the French naval commander François Darlan. Hitler was in a foul mood and declared that he was offering military collaboration with Vichy France one last time, and if France refused again it would be "one of the most regrettable decisions in her history."
- The Rodgers and Hart stage musical Pal Joey premiered at the Ethel Barrymore Theatre on Broadway.
- Died: Agnes Ayres, 42, American actress (cerebral hemorrhage)

== December 26, 1940 (Thursday) ==
- The German cargo ship Baden was scuttled 500 miles west of Cape Finisterre, Spain when it was intercepted by the British light cruiser Bonaventure.
- The romantic comedy film The Philadelphia Story starring Cary Grant, Katharine Hepburn and James Stewart was released.
- The stage comedy production My Sister Eileen by Joseph A. Fields and Jerome Chodorov premiered at the Biltmore Theatre in New York City.
- Born: Edward C. Prescott, economist and Nobel laureate, in Glens Falls, New York (d. 2022)
- Died: Daniel Frohman, 89, American theatrical producer and manager

== December 27, 1940 (Friday) ==
- Admiral Erich Raeder met with Hitler in Berlin and expressed "grave doubts" about starting a war with the Soviet Union before Britain was defeated.
- The drama film Kitty Foyle starring Ginger Rogers, Dennis Morgan and James Craig was released. A style of dress worn by Rogers in the hit film became popular throughout the 1940s, known as a Kitty Foyle dress.
- The science fiction comedy film The Invisible Woman starring Virginia Bruce, John Barrymore and John Howard was released.

== December 28, 1940 (Saturday) ==
- Italy asked Germany for assistance in the Greco-Italian War.
- German submarine U-148 was commissioned.
- Born: Lonnie Liston Smith, jazz, soul and funk keyboardist, in Richmond, Virginia

== December 29, 1940 (Sunday) ==
- President Roosevelt used the phrase "Arsenal of Democracy" during a radio address promising to help the United Kingdom fight Nazi Germany by providing them with war supplies.
- Vichy France created a commission for Jewish affairs.
- The Italian troopship Sardegna was torpedoed and sunk by the Greek submarine Proteus, which was then rammed and sunk by the destroyer Antares.
- The reigning NFL champion Chicago Bears defeated an all-star team 28-14 in the National Football League All-Star Game at Gilmore Stadium in Los Angeles.
- Superman co-creator Joe Shuster was arrested in Miami Beach, Florida for the "suspicious behavior" of looking into an automobile as if preparing to steal it. The following day he was sentenced to 30 days in prison until someone thought to give Shuster a pen and paper so he could prove his identity. Shuster drew a perfect illustration of Superman and the police let him go free.

== December 30, 1940 (Monday) ==
- The famous photograph St Paul's Survives was taken of St Paul's Cathedral in London during the air raid that was nicknamed the Second Great Fire of London.
- U.S. Vice Admiral Claude C. Bloch wrote a letter to the Navy Department complaining of inadequate defenses at Pearl Harbor.
- Born: James Burrows, American television director, in Los Angeles
- Died: Gjergj Fishta, 69, Albanian Franciscan, poet, translator and politician; Childe Wills, 62, American automobile designer

== December 31, 1940 (Tuesday) ==
- RAF bombers attacked Vlorë on the Greco-Italian front, Rotterdam and IJmuiden in the Nazi-occupied Netherlands, and the German cities of Emmerich am Rhein and Cologne.
- Hitler issued a New Year's Order of the Day to Germany's armed forces, declaring "the year 1941 will bring us, on the Western Front, the completion of the greatest victory of our history."
- Film star Bette Davis married businessman Arthur Farnsworth in Rimrock, Arizona.
- The Italian steamship Quinto, sailing from Trieste to Shengjin, sank around 09:20 local time south of Bar after being hit by the Greek submarine Katsonis.
