= February 1941 =

Month of 1941

<<	February 1941					>>
Su	Mo	Tu	We	Th	Fr	Sa
						1
2	3	4	5	6	7	8
9	10	11	12	13	14	15
16	17	18	19	20	21	22
23	24	25	26	27	28

The following events occurred in February 1941:

== February 1, 1941 (Saturday) ==
- On the east African front, the 4th Indian Division captured Agordat while the 5th Indian Division took Metemma.
- The Japanese government announced rice rationing.
- Georgy Zhukov was appointed chief of the Red Army's General Staff.
- General Order 143 split the United States Fleet into separate Atlantic, Pacific and Asiatic Fleets.
- Admiral Husband E. Kimmel became Commander in Chief of the Pacific Fleet.
- German submarine U-68 was commissioned.
- Born: Karl Dall, comedian, singer and television presenter, in Emden, Germany (d. 2020); Jerry Spinelli, children's novelist, in Norristown, Pennsylvania
- Born: Anatoli Firsov, Soviet ice hockey player, three-time Olympic champion (d. 2000)
- Died: William Gibbs McAdoo, 77, American lawyer and statesman

== February 2, 1941 (Sunday) ==
- The Indian 5th Division captured Barentu, Eritrea.
- Benito Mussolini declared the southern portion of Italy to be a war zone and put it under martial law.
- The British aircraft carrier HMS Formidable replaced the damaged Illustrious in the Mediterranean. The Illustrious was sent to the United States for repairs.
- Died: Harris Laning, 67, American admiral; Yanko Sakazov, 80, Bulgarian socialist politician

== February 3, 1941 (Monday) ==
- Erwin Rommel became head of the German military unit soon to be known as the Afrika Korps.
- Cuban President Fulgencio Batista suspended civil liberties and took over personal command of the country's armed forces.
- The refrigerated cargo liner Empire Citizen was torpedoed and sunk in the North Atlantic by the German submarine U-107.
- The People's Commissariat for State Security was created in the Soviet Union.
- The U.S. Supreme Court decided United States v. Darby Lumber Co.
- Born: Dory Funk, Jr., professional wrestler, in Hammond, Indiana; Howard Phillips, politician, in Boston, Massachusetts (d. 2013)

== February 4, 1941 (Tuesday) ==
- The British took Msus, Libya.
- The United Service Organizations (USO) was founded in the United States.
- The refrigerated cargo ship Empire Engineer was torpedoed and sunk in the North Atlantic by the German submarine U-123.
- Born: Gabrielle Roth, dancer and musician, in San Francisco, California (d. 2012)
- Born: Edina Pop, singer and Dschinghis Khan member since 1979, in Munich, Germany

== February 5, 1941 (Wednesday) ==
- In the East African Campaign, the Battle of Keren began.
- The Royal Air Force bombed Düsseldorf, killing 35.
- The Luxembourgish and Belgian francs were withdrawn from circulation and replaced with the Reichsmark.
- Wendell Willkie ended his visit to England with a statement intended for the German people: "I am proud of my German blood, but I hate aggression and tyranny, and I now tell the German people that my convictions are fully shared by the overwhelming majority of Americans of German descent. They, too, believe in freedom and human rights. We German-Americans reject and hate aggression and the lust for power of the present German government."
- The British Air Training Corps was officially established.
- Born: Stephen J. Cannell, television director and producer, in Los Angeles, California (d. 2010); David Selby, actor, in Morgantown, West Virginia; Kaspar Villiger, businessman and politician, in Pfeffikon, Switzerland

== February 6, 1941 (Thursday) ==
- Combeforce captured Benghazi.
- The Battle of Beda Fomm began in Libya.
- The Germans launched Operation Sonnenblume, the dispatch of German troops to North Africa.
- Adolf Hitler wrote to Francisco Franco again urging Spain to enter the war on the side of the Axis.
- Hitler issued Directive No. 23, Directions for Operations against the English War Economy.
- Charles Lindbergh testified before the Senate Foreign Relations Committee to once again oppose the Lend-Lease bill, saying that such aid would only deplete American defenses and prolong the war without materially affecting its course.
- German submarine U-556 was commissioned.
- Died: Maximilien Luce, 82, French artist; Banjo Paterson, 76, Australian bush poet, journalist and author

== February 7, 1941 (Friday) ==
- The Battle of Beda Fomm ended in British victory.
- Died: Aimée Crocker, 78, American socialite and adventurer; Giuseppe Tellera, 58, Italian general (died of wounds sustained in action the previous day during the Battle of Beda Fomm)

== February 8, 1941 (Saturday) ==
- The U.S. House of Representatives voted 265–165 in favor of the Lend-Lease bill.
- Bulgaria agreed to allow German troops to pass within its borders.
- German troops began departing Naples for North Africa.
- German submarine U-83 was commissioned.
- Born: Nick Nolte, actor, in Omaha, Nebraska
- Died: Willis Van Devanter, 81, Associate Justice of the United States Supreme Court from 1911 to 1937

== February 9, 1941 (Sunday) ==
- British forces captured El Agheila. Winston Churchill halted the British advance in North Africa and began withdrawing troops to assist in the defense of Greece.
- Force H of the Royal Navy bombarded Genoa, La Spezia and Livorno, inflicting heavy damage on Italian shore installations.
- Churchill gave an international radio address that concluded with a direct appeal to the United States: "Put your confidence in us. Give us your faith and your blessing, and under Providence all will be well. We shall not fail or falter; we shall not weaken or tire. Neither the sudden shock of battle nor the long-drawn trials of vigilance and exertion will wear us down. Give us the tools and we will finish the job."
- François Darlan became vice-president of the Council of Vichy France.
- Died: Reed Smoot, 79, American senator and leader of the LDS Church

== February 10, 1941 (Monday) ==
- Operation Colossus: A British paratrooper raid destroyed an aqueduct in Calitri, Italy. The operation had negligible impact on the war and 35 paratroopers were captured, but lessons learned from it helped to improve the effectiveness of later airborne operations.
- The Luftwaffe bombed British-held Iceland.
- Britain severed diplomatic relations with Romania due to the presence of 500,000 German troops in the country.
- The U.S. Senate took up H.R. 1776, the Lend-Lease Act which the House of Representatives had passed a month earlier.. Also on Feb. 10, Merwin K. Hart told the Senate Foreign Relations Committee that the Lend-Lease bill would probably lead the country into the war and eventually result in the establishment of a fascist or communist dictatorship in the United States. Lend-Lease passed the Senate on March 8, and was signed into law 3 days. later. It ended US neutrality, led to the US sending $50 billion in aid ($290 billion in 2024 dollars), and was credited with hastening the Allied victory in WWII.
- Born: Michael Apted, film and television director, in Aylesbury, England (d. 2021)

== February 11, 1941 (Tuesday) ==
- The British submarine HMS Snapper was lost in the Bay of Biscay to either a naval mine or a depth charge attack.
- Wendell Willkie, having returned from England, appeared before the Senate Foreign Relations Committee and urged that the United States provide Britain with five to ten destroyers a month.
- Jews fought Germans and Dutch fascists in Amsterdam's Waterlooplein.
- The new Japanese ambassador to the United States, Kichisaburō Nomura, arrived in Washington.
- The German submarine U-80 was commissioned.
- Born: Sergio Mendes, Brazilian jazz musician, in Niteroi (d. 2024)

== February 12, 1941 (Wednesday) ==
- Mussolini met Franco for a two-day conference at Bordighera in another attempt to persuade Spain to join the Axis and enter the war. Franco once again insisted that his country was simply not in a position to do so.
- German cruiser Admiral Hipper attacked the unescorted convoy SLS 64 west of Gibraltar and sank six steamers.
- Erwin Rommel arrived in Libya on a Junkers Ju 52.
- Germans closed off the Jewish Quarter of Amsterdam with barbed wire.
- Former King of Spain Alfonso XIII, living in exile in Rome, renounced the throne in favour of his third son Juan.
- Santiago, Chile celebrated the 400th anniversary of its founding.
- German submarine U-651 was commissioned.
- Born: Naomi Uemura, explorer, in Hidaka, Japan (d. 1984)
- Died: Richhpal Ram, 41, Indian recipient of the Victoria Cross (killed in action in Keren, Eritrea)

== February 13, 1941 (Thursday) ==
- German authorities ordered all gentiles to leave Amsterdam's Jewish Quarter.
- The British minister to Sofia said in a statement that "If the Germans occupy Bulgaria and make it a base against our ally, obviously we shall have to break off relations with Bulgaria and take whatever measures the situation requires."
- German submarine U-557 was commissioned.
- Born: David Jeremiah, televangelist, in Toledo, Ohio; Sigmar Polke, painter and photographer, in Oels, Poland (d. 2010)
- Died: Blind Boy Fuller, 33, American blues musician (pyemia)

== February 14, 1941 (Friday) ==
- British and South African forces captured Kismayo.
- Norwegian war hero Max Manus (at the time in hospital under German supervision), flew by jumping out a window, the only time he was ever captured by the Germans.
- The first units of the Afrika Korps arrived in Tripoli.
- Hitler met with the Yugoslavian Prime Minister Dragiša Cvetković at the Berghof, but was unable to convince Cvetković to sign on to the Tripartite Pact.
- Kichisaburō Nomura came to the White House to present his credentials to President Roosevelt. The president told the ambassador that "there are developments in the relations between the United States and Japan which cause concern," and Nomura replied that he would do all he could to establish better understandings between the two nations.
- Britain announced that beginning the next day it would consider Romania to be "territory under enemy occupation" and would regard the country as an "enemy destination for contraband purposes."

== February 15, 1941 (Saturday) ==
- British and German troops engaged each other in North Africa for the first time in a skirmish near Sirte.
- A great fire broke out in the Spanish city of Santander.
- Italy forced the United States to close consulates in Naples and Palermo.
- German submarine U-78 was commissioned.
- Died: Guido Adler, 85, Bohemian-Austrian musicologist and writer

== February 16, 1941 (Sunday) ==
- The British light cruiser HMS Neptune, in dock for repairs at Chatham, was damaged again by German bombing.
- Born: Kim Jong-il, leader of North Korea, in Vyatskoye, Khabarovsk Krai, USSR (d. 2011) (year and place of birth are according to Soviet records; official North Korean biographies give year of birth as 1942)

== February 17, 1941 (Monday) ==
- The Battle of Trebeshina ended in Greek victory.
- Under German pressure, Turkey signed a non-aggression pact with Bulgaria.
- The cargo ship Gairsoppa was torpedoed and sunk west of Ireland by the German submarine U-101.

== February 18, 1941 (Tuesday) ==
- South African 1st Division captured Mega, Ethiopia.
- Thousands of Australian troops arrived in Singapore to prepare the region for a possible attack by the Japanese.
- The German troops fighting in North Africa officially received the name Afrika Korps.
- The cargo ship Black Osprey was torpedoed and sunk south of Iceland by the German submarine U-96
- The great fire of Santander left 35,000 people homeless.
- German submarine U-203 was commissioned.
- Died: George Minne, 74, Belgian sculptor

== February 19, 1941 (Wednesday) ==
- The three-day Swansea Blitz began.
- The cargo ship Empire Blanda was torpedoed and sunk south of Iceland by the German submarine U-69.
- U.K. Foreign Secretary Anthony Eden met with Archibald Wavell and Alan Cunningham in Cairo to discuss the prospect of British involvement in Greece.
- Born: David Gross, physicist and Nobel laureate, in Washington, D.C.

== February 20, 1941 (Thursday) ==
- The German cruiser Admiral Scheer sank the Greek steamer Grigorios C II and captured the British tanker British Advocate west of the Seychelles.
- Greece rejected a German offer to mediate in the Greco-Italian War.
- President Roosevelt signed legislation establishing a new Coast Guard Reserve patterned after the Navy Reserve.
- German submarine U-558 was commissioned.
- Born: Buffy Sainte-Marie, musician and activist, in Qu'Appelle Valley, Saskatchewan, Canada

== February 21, 1941 (Friday) ==
- The three-day Swansea Blitz ended with 230 killed and 409 wounded, but the strategically important docks and oil refineries were largely unaffected.
- Admiral Scheer struck again in the Indian Ocean, sinking the British freighter Canadian Cruiser.
- The Fritz Lang-directed Western film Western Union starring Robert Young, Randolph Scott and Dean Jagger was released.
- Died: Frederick Banting, 49, Canadian medical scientist and Nobel laureate (died of wounds from a plane crash)

== February 22, 1941 (Saturday) ==
- British and South African forces defeated the Italians at Jilib.
- Admiral Scheer sank the Dutch collier Rantau Pandjang. HMS Hermes and a seaplane from HMS Glasgow were dispatched to hunt for the cruiser, but were unsuccessful.
- A meeting was held in Athens attended by King George II, Prime Minister Koryzis, Anthony Eden and the Generals Dill and Wavell. The conference agreed on the risky decision to send a British expeditionary force to Greece.
- Demonstrations were held in several cities in Bulgaria protesting the German presence in the country.
- German submarine U-81 was commissioned.
- Born: Hipólito Mejía, 51st President of the Dominican Republic, in Gurabo, Dominican Republic

== February 23, 1941 (Sunday) ==
- The Royal Navy monitor HMS Terror was badly damaged by Junkers Ju 88 dive bomber attacks and abandoned to sink off Derna, Libya.
- Mussolini made a speech in Rome in which he admitted that Italy had experienced "gray days" in the war so far, but maintained that such things happen "in all wars" and that "the final result will be Axis victory."
- Plutonium was chemically identified by Glenn T. Seaborg and his team of chemists at University of California, Berkeley.
- Born: Ron Hunt, baseball player, in St. Louis, Missouri

== February 24, 1941 (Monday) ==
- The British destroyer HMS Dainty was sunk by German bombers off Tobruk.
- Hitler gave a speech in Munich on the 21st anniversary of the founding of the Nazi Party declaring that the U-boat offensive would intensify in the coming months.
- The results of a Gallup poll were published asking Americans, "Do you think the United States should try to keep Japan from seizing the Dutch East Indies and Singapore?" 56% said yes, 24% said no, 20% expressed no opinion. A different version of the question asked, "Do you think the United States should risk war with Japan, if necessary, in order to keep Japan from taking the Dutch East Indies and Singapore?" 46% said no, 39% said yes, 15% gave no opinion.
- Died: Lothar von Arnauld de la Perière, 54, German U-boat commander (plane crash)

== February 25, 1941 (Tuesday) ==
- British and South African forces captured Mogadishu, the capital of Italian Somaliland.
- Operation Abstention: At dawn hundreds of British commandos landed on the Italian-held island of Kastellorizo off the coast of Turkey. The Regia Aeronautica began bombing the British positions immediately, while four warships were sent to shell the positions and land reinforcements.
- The Italian light cruiser Armando Diaz was torpedoed and sunk off the Kerkennah Islands by the British submarine HMS Upright.
- The British destroyer HMS Exmoor was sunk off Lowestoft by German E-boats.
- The February strike began in the Netherlands protesting the anti-Jewish measures of the Nazi occupiers.
- The German battleship Tirpitz was commissioned.

== February 26, 1941 (Wednesday) ==
- Northwest of Ireland, German submarine U-47 sank four ships from convoy OB 290. Five Fw 200 patrol bombers of I/KG.40 arrived and sank seven more steamers of the convoy.
- Franco belatedly replied to Hitler's three-week-old letter, expressing support for the Axis but making exorbitant demands for the price of Spain's entry into the war.
- The February strike was largely put down.

== February 27, 1941 (Thursday) ==
- Action of 27 February 1941: The Italian auxiliary cruiser Ramb I was sunk off Maldives by the New Zealand light cruiser HMNZS Leander.
- The Italians landed the remainder of their reinforcements on Kastellorizo.
- The 13th Academy Awards were held in Los Angeles, with Rebecca winning Best Picture. This year's ceremony marked the first time that the names of the winners were sealed in envelopes before they were opened during the ceremony itself, following the previous year's snafu when the Los Angeles Times published the winners ahead of the ceremony.
- German submarine U-559 was commissioned.
- Born: Paddy Ashdown, politician and diplomat, in New Delhi, British India (d. 2018)
- Died: William D. Byron, 45, American congressman (plane crash)

== February 28, 1941 (Friday) ==
- Operation Abstention ended in Italian victory when the last remaining British commandos surrendered.
- British planes bombed Asmara.
- Born: Suzanne Mubarak, First Lady of Egypt, in Minya Governorate, Egypt
- Died: Alfonso XIII of Spain, 54, King of Spain from 1886 to 1931
