= The Spongetones =

American power pop band

- The Spongetones' first LP, Beat Music, consisted of all original material.

Background information
- Origin: Charlotte, North Carolina
- Genre: Power pop
- Years active: 1978–present
- Labels: Ripete Records; Triapore Records; Loaded Goat Records; Black Vinyl; Gadfly Records; Big Stir
- Spinoffs: Jamie and Steve; Pop Co-Op
- Members: Jamie Hoover; Steve Stoeckel; Pat Walters; Eric Willhelm
- Past members: Rob Thorne; Greg James; Jon Rozzelle; Chris Garges
- Website: www.bigstirrecords.com/the-spongetones

The Spongetones are an American power pop band from Charlotte, North Carolina. While there have been slight variations in lineup over the years, current band members are Jamie Hoover (vocals, guitar), Pat Walters (vocals, guitar, keys), Steve Stoeckel (vocals, bass, guitar), and Eric Willhelm (drums, percussion).

== History ==
The Spongetones formed in 1978 with members Pat Walters, Steve Stoeckel, Rob Thorne, and Jake Berger for what they thought would be one-night performance at a local nightclub playing British Invasion covers. Shortly thereafter, Jamie Hoover replaced Jake Berger and the group began writing and recording original music, carrying on the musical genre with jangle pop riffs and Beatlesque vocals. They released their first 45 single "Better Take It Easy" backed with "You're the One" in 1980 on Gear Records and their first LP "Beat Music" in 1982 on Ripete Records. They followed up with "Torn Apart" in 1984. Rolling Stone gave Beat Music a 3-1/2 star review and Torn Apart a 3-star review.

During the 1980s, four of the band's songs were played and rated on the TV show American Bandstand: (My Girl) Maryanne, She Goes Out With Everybody, Torn Apart, and Tom.

Spongetones song " Skinny" (from Textural Drone Thing) served as the theme song for ABC's entertainment and pop-culture segment The Skinny beginning in 2007. In 2008, ABC's World News Now producer David Bandfield invited the Spongetones to write and record a cover of the World News polka. The recording aired on ABC's World News Now to a national audience.

In his 2007 book, Shake Some Action, John M. Borack rated the Beat and Torn album (a re-release of Beat Music with Torn Apart on CD) at number 25 of his "Top 200 Power Pop Albums" of all time. Borak compared the album to early Beatles and Searchers. Noel Murray of The A.V. Club included "She Goes Out With Everybody" In the October 11, 2012 article "A beginners’ guide to the heyday of power-pop, 1972-1986" .

The band also received positive reviews in Billboard (March 24, 1983), Rolling Stone (September 15, 1983 Beat Music review by Parke Puterbaugh and May 10, 1984 Torn Apart review by Kurt Loder ) and Goldmine (November 2006). In spite of the good press, the Spongetones remained a mostly regional band with a loyal following of local fans and power pop lovers. They were inducted into the Power Pop Hall of Fame in 2016. Notable shows over the years include:

- The last show at Blowing Rock, NC's historic P. B. Scott's, which shut down in 1983.
- CBGB's, 1984, New York City.
- WBCY-108 FM sponsored show, Charlotte, NC, 1984, with special guest, Nicky Hopkins.
- Live in Los Angeles, 1998.
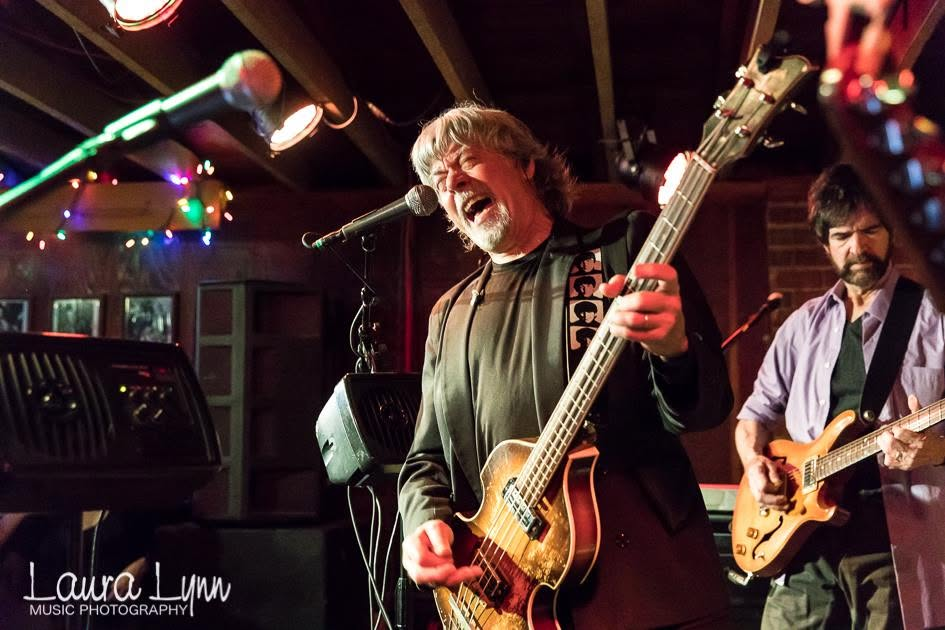
  The Spongetones play the last NYE show at the historic Double Door Inn in Charlotte, NC, December 31, 2016.
- 2019 tour of Tokyo Japan in a joint promotion with Air Mail Recordings.
- The last New Year's eve show at the historic Double Door Inn in Charlotte, NC on December 31, 2016.

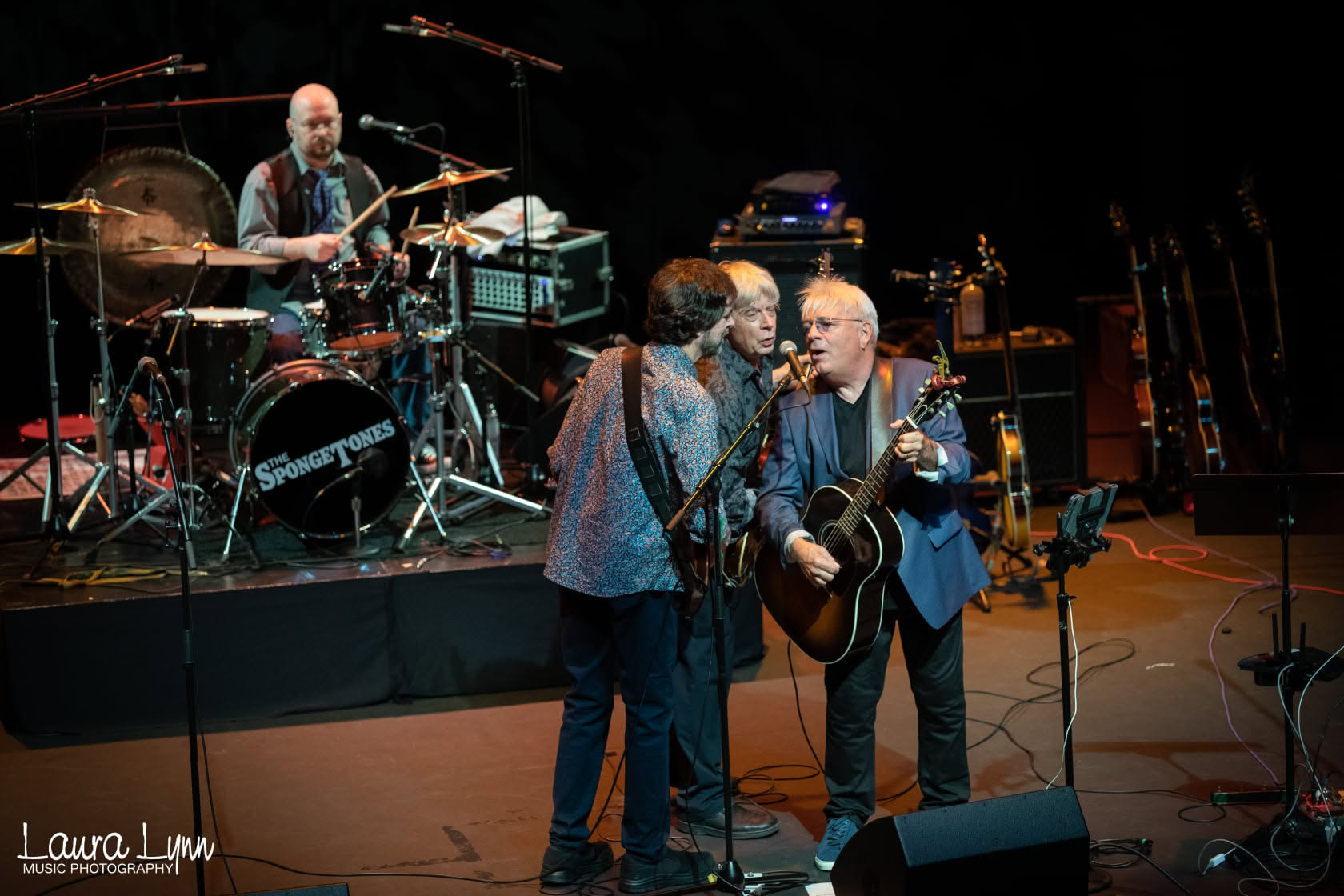
The Spongetones 40th Anniversary Show, August 14, 2021, featuring Chris Garges on drums.

- 40th Anniversary show Saturday, August 14, 2021, at the Blumenthal Arts Center McGlohon Theater (Spirit Square) in Charlotte, North Carolina. This show was delayed from the originally scheduled date by a year due to the COVID-19 pandemic.

The Spongetones released what was assumed to be their last album of originals, Scrambled Eggs, in 2009. The band continued to play live in and around Charlotte, NC but released no new materials. Hoover and Stoeckel wrote and recorded under the duo name "Jamie and Steve". They released a full length album, English Afterthoughts, in 2009 and followed up with four EPs, culminating with Sub-textural in 2017.

After 2017, Hoover continued his work recording and producing other artists. In 2016, Stoeckel formed a side project called Pop Co-Op, through which he wrote and recorded until 2022. He signed as a solo artist with the Burbank, California label Big Stir Records in 2022 and released his first solo album, The Power of And, in 2023.

In 2023, The Spongetones also signed with Big Stir Records and published a live CD as their first release since 2009. The CD included selections from their 40th Anniversary show and included 3 new original bonus tracks. The group then began working on a new full length album of originals and released three singles. No album release date is known.

== Band members ==
Current

- Jamie Hoover (guitars, vocals, occasional bass and drums, songwriting). In addition to his work with the Spongetones, Hoover toured and recorded with Don Dixon and Marti Jones, the Smithereens, and Graham Parker (as a member of the Small Clubs). Hoover produced and recorded with Americana artist Rebecca Rippy. He owned and operated a project studio in Charlotte, North Carolina, called "Hooverama@Liquid Studios". Hoover collaborated with musician Bill Lloyd via "through-the-mail writing". Hoover either produced or co-produced all the Spongetones' albums. He continues to produce music for other musicians in his private studio. He also works as an instructor for Bold Music, a private music lessons company based in Charlotte.
- Steve Stoeckel (bass, ukulele, vocals, guitars, songwriting). Stoeckel was the band's original bassist. He quit the band in 1985 but rejoined in 1989 and is with them today. Stoeckel was instrumental in co-writing much of the band's original material and sang lead on many of their songs.
- Pat Walters (guitars, vocals and keyboards, songwriting). Walters was the lead guitarist on the Paragons' classic garage rock single "Abba". Other bands included the Barons, the Good, The Bad & The Ugly and Jeremiah (a band which also included future Wings drummer Denny Seiwell and session guitarist David Spinozza, who played on McCartney's Ram LP). While a teenager, Walters played lead guitar on the Aaron Neville single, "Mojo Hannah". He was also a backing musician for Lesley Gore, Bobby Vee, Tommy Roe and others.
- Eric Willhelm (drums). Willhelm joined the Spongetones in 2022, following the death of Chris Garges.

Past

- Rob Thorne (drums, percussion). Thorne was the original Spongetones drummer and was with the band for 33 years. He was inducted into the North Carolina Music Hall of Fame in 2013 for his work with the Catalinas.
- Greg James (bass, keyboards, backing vocals). James was the Spongetones' bassist in 1985-1986, when Stoeckel left the band between the releases of Torn Apart and Where-Ever-Land. James maintained a working relationship with the band, contributing as a co-writer and session musician on every Spongetones album from 1987 to 2005.
- Jon Rozzelle (bass). Rozzelle was the Spongetones' bassist from the summer of 1986 until the spring of 1987.
- Chris Garges (drums). Garges joined the Spongetones in 2014 and died of cancer on February 22, 2022, at the age of 48. Garges previously played with Don Dixon, Mitch Easter and many others. He owned and operated Old House Studio in Charlotte, NC.

== Influences ==
The band cites the following influences: the Beatles, the Rolling Stones, the Dave Clark 5, the Animals, the Zombies, the Hollies, Manfred Mann, Gerry & The Pacemakers, the Searchers, the Kinks, the Beach Boys, the Yardbirds, the Byrds, Cream, Jimi Hendrix, the Doors, the Who, and Spirit.

== Discography ==
=== Studio Recordings ===
- 1982: Beat Music
- 1984: Torn Apart (mini LP) (R.E.M. were recording their second album, Reckoning, in Studio A of Reflection Studios in Charlotte, North Carolina; the Spongetones were using Studio C. Bill Berry, Peter Buck and Mike Mills of R.E.M. and their producers, Mitch Easter and Don Dixon, were asked if they would add handclaps to the track "Shock Therapy".)
- 1987: Where-Ever Land
- 1991: Oh Yeah!
- 1995: Textural Drone Thing
- 2000: Odd Fellows
- 2005: Number 9
- 2008: Too Clever by Half
- 2009: Scrambled Eggs

=== Live ===
- 2025: The 40th Anniversary Concert... And Beyond (live)

=== Compilations ===
- 1986: Welcome to Comboland: A Collection of Twelve Artists From North Carolina (various artists compilation)
- 1994: Beat & Torn (Beat Music and Torn Apart, plus one bonus track)
- 2002: Mersey Christmas (Christmas-themed fan club releases)
- 2005: Beat the Spongetones (early demo recordings)
- 2007: Always Carry On: The Best of the Spongetones

=== Singles ===
- "Curiosity" on Shoe Fetish: A Tribute to the Shoes

=== Related Band Member Works ===
Jamie Hoover

- 1990: Coupons, Questions and Comments
- 2004: Jamie Hoo-Ever
- 2006: Lind Me Four
- 2006: Most Loved Melodies (compilation)
- 2014: Jamie Two Ever

Jamie and Steve

Hoover and Stoeckel continue to work together, writing and recording new music.

- 2009: English Afterthoughts
- 2011: The Next Big Thing
- 2012: English Afterthoughts (Japanese release; compilation of English Afterthoughts and The Next Big Thing.)
- 2013: Imaginary Cafe
- 2014: Circling

Jamie Hoover and Bill Lloyd

- 2004: Paparazzi

Pop Co-Op (Steve Stoeckel)

- 2017: Four State Solution
- 2020: Factory Settings
- 2022: Suspension
