= Church Bells May Ring =

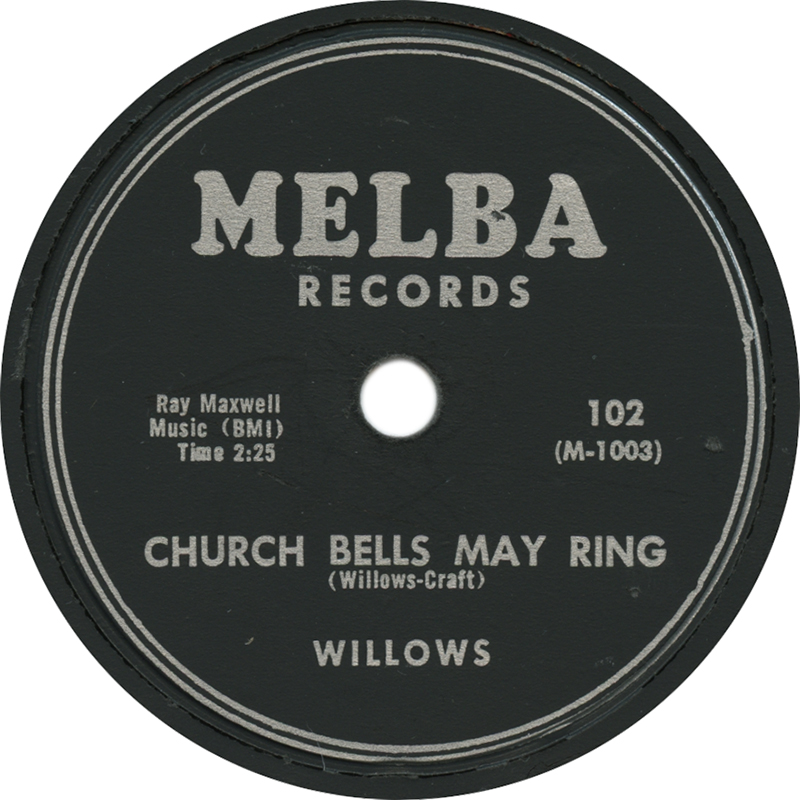

Single by The Willows
- B-side: "Baby Tell Me"
- Released: February 1956
- Genre: Doo-wop
- Length: 2:25
- Label: Melba
- Songwriter(s): The Willows, Morty Craft

The Willows singles chronology
"So Help Me" (1954)	"Church Bells May Ring" (1956)	"This Is the End" (1956)

"Church Bells May Ring" is a song written by The Willows, with songwriting credits also given to Morty Craft; Craft, a veteran arranger and talent scout, owned Melba Records, the label the Willows recorded for, and as often happened in the 1950s, label executives would give themselves a songwriting credit. There is little evidence Craft wrote the song, and according to the band members, he only paid them $200, despite the fact that the song sold well. The Willows were formed in New York City in 1952. Their original name was the Five Willows, and their song was originally called "Church Bells Are Ringing." "Church Bells May Ring" reached number 11 on the U.S. R&B chart and number 67 on the U.S. pop chart in 1956.

Neil Sedaka played chimes on the song.

== Other charting versions ==
- The Diamonds released a version of the song as a single which reached number 14 on the U.S. pop chart in 1956.
- The Willows re-released a version of the song as a single which reached number 114 on the U.S. pop chart in 1961.

== Other versions ==
- The Cadets released a version of the song as the B-side to their 1956 single "Heartbreak Hotel".
- Sunny Gale released a version of the song as a single in 1960, but it did not chart.
- The Four Seasons released a version of the song on their 1964 album Dawn (Go Away) and 11 Other Great Songs.
- The Shirelles released a version of the song on their 1964 album The Shirelles Sing the Golden Oldies.
