= Oh Yeah! (Spongetones album) =

Studio album by the Spongetones
- Released: 1991
- Genre: Power pop
- Label: Black Vinyl
- Producer: Jamie Hoover

The Spongetones chronology
Where-Ever-Land (1987)	Oh Yeah! (1991)	Beat & Tom (1994)

Oh Yeah! is an album by the American band the Spongetones, released in 1991. It was issued by the Shoes' Black Vinyl Records, and was one of the first non-Shoes albums to be released by the label. Oh Yeah! was reissued in Japan by Sony Records, in 1995.

== Production ==
The album was produced by band member Jamie Hoover, and was recorded at his house in the Charlotte, North Carolina, area.

== Critical reception ==
Professional ratings
Review scores
Source	Rating
AllMusic	4.5/5 stars
Chicago Tribune	2.5/4 stars
MusicHound Rock: The Essential Album Guide	4/5 stars

Stereo Review thought that "the fourteen cuts are actually an embarrassment of riches, like a greatest-hits album from the land of ought-to-be." Trouser Press wrote that "the disc’s only real negative aspect is the disappointingly thin-sounding production."

The Chicago Tribune praised "Am I Dancing or What?", writing that it "finds the 'Tones taking a slow ska boat down the Mersey and jumping off for an exuberant psychedelic break in midstream." The Virginian-Pilot determined that "the chinka-chinka guitar, Lennon-esque harmonica and perfect harmonies give the disc a feel that is refreshingly unpretentious."

AllMusic called the album "infectious Beatlesque power pop ... easily their best songwriting." MusicHound Rock: The Essential Album Guide concluded that Oh Yeah! "assimilates the Spongetones' influences into a brilliant work that's still beholden to the Beatles, but less slavish in its devotion."

== Track listing ==
No.	Title	Length
1.	"Not So"
2.	"Always Carry On"
3.	"Got Nothing Left to Hide"
4.	"Oh Yeah!"
5.	"Infatuation"
6.	"Are You Gonna, Do You Need To (Love Me)"
7.	"Return the Boy"
8.	"Somewhere in the World"
9.	"Brand New Start"
10.	"Now Is Now"
11.	"Words and Music"
12.	"Am I Dancing or What?"
13.	"Stupid Heart"
14.	"Goodbye"
