= The Stroll (song) =

Single by The Diamonds
- B-side: "Land of Beauty"
- Released: December 2, 1957
- Genre: Rock and roll
- Length: 2:30
- Label: Mercury
- Songwriters: Nancy Lee, Clyde Otis

The Diamonds singles chronology
"Silhouettes" (1957)	"The Stroll" (1957)	"High Sign" (1958)

"The Stroll" is a song written by Nancy Lee and Clyde Otis and performed by The Diamonds. It reached No. 1 on the Cashbox chart, #4 on the U.S. pop chart, and #5 on the U.S. R&B chart in 1958.

The song was ranked #48 on Billboard magazine's Top 50 singles of 1958.

The Diamonds were the first to record "The Stroll". Although he was known as "King of the Stroll" for other songs suitable for dancing the stroll to, the song "The Stroll" was, contrary to rumor, never recorded by Chuck Willis.

== Other versions ==
- Frankie Avalon released a version of the song on his 1958 album Frankie Avalon.
- Leroy Kirkland's Rock-Chas released a version of the song on his 1958 EP Strollin' the Cha Cha Cha.
- Ken Mackintosh and His Orchestra released a version of the song as a single in 1958, but it did not chart.
- Jack Pleis and Owen Bradley released a version of the song on their 1958 album Bandstand Hop.
- Chubby Checker released a version of the song on his 1961 album It's Pony Time.
- Brenda Lee released a version of the song on her 1985 compilation album The Golden Decade.
- Adriano Celentano released a version of the song on his 1998 album Selection of Adriano Celentano.
- Jimmy Nalls released a version of the song on his 1999 album Ain't No Stranger.
- The Countdown Singers released a version of the song on their 2003 album Doo Wop.

== In popular culture ==
- The song is referenced in the lyrics of Led Zeppelin's "Rock and Roll" ("It's been a long time since I did the stroll").
- The Diamonds' version was featured on the soundtrack to the 1973 film American Graffiti.
- The Smithereens released a version that was featured on the 1994 soundtrack to the television series Rebel Highway.
- The Diamonds' version was featured in the 1996 film Beautiful Girls.
