= From the Bottom of My Heart (Chuck Willis song) =

"From the Bottom of My Heart" is an R&B song written by Chuck Willis recorded by both The Clovers and The Diamonds.
