= Rebecca Rippy =

American singer-songwriter

- Born: 1977 (age 48–49)
- Origin: Tennessee, United States
- Genres: Country, rock, folk, Americana
- Occupation: Singer-songwriter
- Instruments: Guitar, vocals
- Years active: 2008–present

Rebecca Rippy (born 1977) is an American singer-songwriter, most notably in the roots country and Americana genres. She was born to a musical family and grew up singing gospel music, picking up a guitar and starting to write at 19 years of age. She has released two critically acclaimed records, Secrets (2008), and Telling Stories (2009). She has played or shared the stage with such well-known acts and artists as REM producer Don Dixon, Leon Russell, Lucy Kaplansky, Tony Rice, Donna the Buffalo, Jim Lauderdale, Bill Mallonee and the Vigilantes of Love, Tinsley Ellis, John Cowan, Rhonda Vincent, Danielle Howle, and Old Crow Medicine Show, and has become a regular performer at such venues as the Bluebird Café in Nashville, Tennessee, and at the Neighborhood Theater in Charlotte, North Carolina.

Both her debut record, Secrets, and her 2009 release Telling Stories were produced by Jamie Hoover, a multi-instrumentalist, producer, and recording engineer who has worked with Hootie and the Blowfish, The Smithereens, and Don Dixon and the Jump Rabbits, and is the leader of his own band, the Spongetones. Telling Stories also features a duet with Don Dixon. The song "It's October", from Telling Stories, was released as a music video in December 2009. Telling Stories debuted in the Americana chart in January 2010, and hit a peak position in the National Roots Country Top 40 of number 20.
