= Little Darlin' =

1957 single by the Diamonds

Single by the Diamonds

from the album America's Favorite Song Stylists
- B-side: "Faithful and True"
- Released: February 8, 1957
- Genre: Rock and roll, doo-wop
- Length: 2:05
- Label: Mercury
- Songwriter: Maurice Williams

"Little Darlin'"

Song by Elvis Presley

from the album Moody Blue
- Released: July 19, 1977
- Recorded: April 24, 1977
- Genre: Rock
- Length: 1:56
- Label: RCA Records
- Songwriter: Maurice Williams

"Little Darlin'" is a popular song made famous by the Diamonds.

== The Gladiolas' version ==
It was written by a 16-year-old Maurice Williams with both melody and doo-wop accompaniment strongly emphasizing a calypso rhythm. First recorded in January 1957 by Williams' group the Gladiolas, it was quickly released as a single on Excello Records, a small swamp blues label owned by Nashville record man Earnie Young, who was responsible for creating the song's Latin feel, naming the group and ensuring Williams would retain the song's publishing. The recording, inspired by a book Williams was writing, and originally called "Little Darlin'/ The Beginning," is noted for its trademark doo-wop falsetto by Fred Mangum and its spoken bridge by Williams ("My Darlin' I need you ..."). The Gladiolas were from Lancaster, South Carolina, where they had been together since high school. The Gladiolas' version peaked at No. 11 on the R&B charts in April 1957, but barely dented the Hot 100. By 1959, Williams' group eventually became "Maurice Williams and the Zodiacs" with the rock 'n roll-R&B hit "Stay".

The Gladiolas' version was included in Robert Christgau's "Basic Record Library" of 1950s and 1960s recordings, published in Christgau's Record Guide: Rock Albums of the Seventies (1981).

== The Diamonds' version ==
The Diamonds' successful cover version followed a month later. The Diamonds were a Canadian pop group that evolved into a doo-wop group. The Diamonds' version reached number two in sales for eight weeks on the Billboard Hot 100. Billboard ranked this version as the No. 3 song for 1957. In Canada, the song was No. 11 on the premiere CHUM Chart, May 27, 1957.

The Diamonds' version is generally considered superior. AllMusic critic Stephen Thomas Erlewine argues that the Diamonds "Little Darlin'" is an unusual example of a cover being better than the original:

[T]he Diamonds' take remained the bigger hit, and over the years, the better-known version. Normally, this would have been an outrage, but there's a reason why the Diamonds' version has sustained its popularity over the years: it's a better, fiercer recording. Both versions are good, even if they're a little silly, because it's a good doo wop song, giving each member of the quartet a lot to do. At times, the vocal phrases verge on self-parody -- the "ai-ya-yi-yai-yai-ya"'s or the "wella-wella"'s -- which may be why The Diamonds' version is superior.

On the Pop Chronicles, host John Gilliland claimed that their version was in fact a parody of the genre. Nonetheless, "Little Darlin'" (primarily the Diamonds' version, but to some extent the Gladiolas' version) remains an all-time rock 'n roll R&B classic.

== Other recordings ==
- Elvis Presley performed the song and a version appears on his final album, Moody Blue (1977).
- Rock-and-roll-revival group Sha Na Na performed "Little Darlin'" at the Woodstock Festival in 1969.
- The Four Seasons
- The Monkees performed a live version on their 1969 TV special 33⅓ Revolutions Per Monkee.
- Joan Baez performed a parody version in concert in the early 1960s which appears on the 1983 compilation Very Early Joan. The title song of her album Honest Lullaby (1979) quotes the vocal hook of "Little Darlin".
- Classics IV
- The Rocky Fellers
- The Chevrons
- Victor Wood (1971)

== See also ==
- 1957 in music
