= Ladders (band) =

- Origin: New York City
- Genres: Rhythm and blues, doo wop
- Years active: 1950s
- Labels: Holiday
- Past members: Johnny Jackson; Herb Jennings; Irvin Jones; Ron Clark; Douglas Jackson

Ladders were a 1950s New York City rhythm and blues and doo wop vocal group. The line up comprised Johnny Jackson (lead), Herb Jennings (first tenor), Irvin Jones (second tenor), Ron Clark (baritone), and Douglas Jackson (bass).

== Discography ==
- "I Want to Know" / "Counting the Stars" Holiday Records, 1958
- "My Love Is Gone" / "Hey Pretty Baby" 1958
