= This Is Easy: The Best of Marshall Crenshaw =

Greatest hits album by Marshall Crenshaw
- Released: 2000
- Recorded: 1981–1996
- Genres: Rock; pop
- Length: 74:57
- Label: Rhino
- Producers: Alan Betrock, Marshall Crenshaw, T-Bone Burnett, Don Dixon, Mitch Easter, Richard Gottehrer, Larry Hirsch, David Kershenbaum, Steve Lillywhite, Paul McKenna, Ed Stasium

Marshall Crenshaw chronology
#447 (1999)	This Is Easy: The Best of Marshall Crenshaw (2000)	I've Suffered For My Art…Now It's Your Turn (2001)

This Is Easy: The Best of Marshall Crenshaw is a greatest hits album by singer-songwriter Marshall Crenshaw. It was released in 2000 on Rhino Records.

== Background ==
This Is Easy includes twenty songs from Crenshaw's first seven studio albums and two tracks originally released on singles: "Something's Gonna Happen", a 1981 single on Alan Betrock's Shake Records before Crenshaw's major label debut, and "You're My Favorite Waste of Time", the B-side of Crenshaw's biggest hit, "Someday, Someway". The compilation's title comes from the track, "This Is Easy," which originally appeared on Crenshaw's 1987 album Mary Jean & 9 Others.

The tracklist for the album was compiled by Gary Stewart and David Gorman. Crenshaw, despite having some input on the album's sleeve and formatting, did not participate in choosing the songs. He explained, "I had some input into the thing, suggestions about who they should get photos from, about who should write the liner notes (my good friend, the late great Cub Koda), but they wouldn't take any of my suggestions about song selection – they really wanted to run with that themselves, which I actually think is cool. For them the whole thing was a labor of love, which meant a lot to me."

== Critical reception ==
Professional ratings
Review scores
Source	Rating
AllMusic	4.5/5 stars
Entertainment Weekly	A−
The Rolling Stone Album Guide	4/5 stars

This Is Easy has seen praise from critics for highlighting Crenshaw's career in spite of his dearth of commercial success. Entertainment Weekly's David Browne commented, "In light of his history, there's more than a touch of bittersweet irony in the title of Crenshaw's first ever anthology, This Is Easy. Still, this welcome and overdue compilation makes the best of a sad situation. The tracks off his first two albums ... sound as invigorating as ever." William Ruhlmann of AllMusic also spoke positively of the compilation, concluding, "The tracks are all pop gems, and they do, as Stewart and Gorman claim, induce the fantasy of a world in which classic, 1965-vintage pop/rock was still on top 20 years later. It's a nice dream for rock & roll fans; with this album they can close their eyes and, for 75 minutes, pretend it's true."

== Track listing ==
All songs written by Marshall Crenshaw, except where noted.

No.	Title	Writer(s)	Source	Length
1.	"Something's Gonna Happen"		Shake Records single (1981)	2:17
2.	"Someday, Someway"		Marshall Crenshaw (1982)	2:49
3.	"There She Goes Again"			2:38
4.	"Cynical Girl"			2:34
5.	"Mary Anne"			2:53
6.	"You're My Favorite Waste of Time"		Warner Bros. single (1982)	2:39
7.	"Monday Morning Rock" (edited version)	Crenshaw, David Weiss	Field Day (1983)	3:09
8.	"Whenever You're on My Mind"	Crenshaw, Bill Teeley		3:18
9.	"Our Town" (edited version)			4:01
10.	"For Her Love"			3:03
11.	"I'm Sorry (But So Is Brenda Lee)"	Ben Vaughn	Downtown (1985)	3:20
12.	"Little Wild One (No. 5)"			3:52
13.	"Blues Is King"			3:49
14.	"Like a Vague Memory"			4:09
15.	"Calling Out for Love (at Crying Time)"	Crenshaw, Don Dixon	Mary Jean & 9 Others (1987)	4:33
16.	"This Is Easy"			3:51
17.	"Somebody Crying" (edited version)			3:06
18.	"You Should've Been There" (edited version)	Crenshaw, Leroy Preston	Good Evening (1989)	3:36
19.	"Someplace Where Love Can't Find Me"	John Hiatt		4:02
20.	"Better Back Off" (edited version)	Crenshaw, Tom Teeley	Life's Too Short (1991)	4:26
21.	"What Do You Dream Of?"		Miracle of Science (1996)	3:28
22.	"Starless Summer Sky" (remix)	Crenshaw, Rick Cioffi, Fred Todd		3:24
