= I've Suffered for My Art...Now It's Your Turn =

I've Suffered For My Art…Now It's Your Turn

Live album by Marshall Crenshaw
- Released: 2001
- Recorded: The Stone Pony, Asbury Park, N.J., February 16, 2001
- Genre: Rock
- Length: 55:15
- Label: King Biscuit

Marshall Crenshaw chronology
| This Is Easy: The Best of Marshall Crenshaw (2000) | I've Suffered For My Art…Now It's Your Turn (2001) | What's In The Bag? (2003) |

Professional ratings
Review scores
| Source | Rating |
|---|---|
| AllMusic | 3.5/5 stars |

I've Suffered For My Art…Now It's Your Turn is a live album by singer/songwriter Marshall Crenshaw. It was recorded at the noted venue The Stone Pony in Asbury Park, N.J. on February 16, 2001. It includes many of Crenshaw's best known songs, four tunes from his most recent studio album, #447, and a pair of vintage covers; Jody Reynolds' "Endless Sleep" and The Left Banke's "Walk Away Renée". The acoustic show was performed by Crenshaw solo but for a few songs accompanied by bass and accordion.

The title is a misquote of a joke by Neil Innes that is best known from a 1976 Amnesty International benefit.

In 2002, BMG Special Products released the album Marshall Crenshaw: Greatest Hits Acoustic. It was made up of ten tracks from the I've Suffered For My Art…Now It's Your Turn performance in a different order.

== Track listing ==
All songs written by Marshall Crenshaw, except where noted.

1. "Television Light" – 6:37
2. "Endless Sleep" (Jody Reynolds) – 2:37
3. "Cynical Girl" – 3:45
4. "Tell Me All About It" (Crenshaw, Richard Julian) – 3:37
5. "Better Back Off" (Crenshaw, Tom Teeley) – 4:25
6. "Little Wild One (No. 5)" – 4:24
7. "What Do You Dream Of?" – 4:18
8. "Dime a Dozen Guy" (Crenshaw, David Cantor) – 5:13
9. "T.M.D." (Crenshaw, Bill Demaine) – 3:42
10. "Walk Away Renee" (Michael Brown, Bob Calilli, Tony Sansone) – 2:57
11. "You're My Favorite Waste of Time" – 3:40
12. "Whenever You're on My Mind" (Crenshaw, Bill Teeley) – 3:25
13. "There She Goes Again" – 2:57
14. "Someday, Someway" – 3:38

=== Greatest Hits Acoustic track listing ===
1. "Someday, Someway"
2. "You're My Favorite Waste of Time"
3. "Cynical Girl"
4. "Little Wild One (No. 5)"
5. "Whenever You're on My Mind"
6. "Better Back Off"
7. "Tell Me All About It"
8. "T.M.D."
9. "There She Goes Again"
10. "Dime a Dozen Guy"

== Personnel ==
- Marshall Crenshaw - vocals, guitar
- Greg Cohen – bass
- Charlie Giordano – accordion
