= Frankie's House =

Frankie's House may refer to:

- Frankie's House (TV series), a 1992 TV British-Australian drama, based on the autobiography of British photographer Tim Page
- Frankie's House (soundtrack), the soundtrack album for the above, by Jeff Beck and Jed Leiber
