= Mary Anne (song) =

1982 song by Marshall Crenshaw

Song by Marshall Crenshaw

from the album Marshall Crenshaw
- Released: April 28, 1982
- Recorded: January 1982
- Genre: New wave
- Label: Warner Bros.
- Producers: Richard Gottehrer; Marshall Crenshaw

"Mary Anne" is a 1982 song by American rock musician Marshall Crenshaw. The song was released on his 1982 debut album, Marshall Crenshaw. Written from the perspective of trying to console someone, the song's title was not based on a specific girl. The song's hook was described by Crenshaw as going for a "hypnotic" effect and the song features layered 12-string guitar parts.

"Mary Anne" was not released as a single. Despite this, it has since become one of Crenshaw's most famous songs, seeing positive critical reception and becoming a live favorite.

== Background ==
"Mary Anne" originated from the titular name; Crenshaw explained, "I had the idea to write a song called 'Mary Anne,' that was the first thing. Just kinda the way the word rolls out of my mouth was a good thing." The song was not written with anyone in mind—Crenshaw recalled, "I didn’t really know anybody named Mary Anne. It's just got kind of a musical sound to it. I think a couple of years earlier than that, I tried to write a song around the name Mary Anne, just because, again, it's kind of a musical-sounding name, or I thought so, anyway." Crenshaw has described the song as being about "consoling somebody" and "try[ing] not to let your anxieties overwhelm you." He elaborated,

At the time I had a friend who's [sic] girlfriend married another friend of mine. This was like 1979, 1980. In my head I was consoling that person. But the lyrics aren't specific, they're just kind of general. Sometimes you just have to laugh at life, laugh at your misery to keep yourself sane, etc. That’s the only way you can go forward sometimes. I remember at the time I was trying to be very minimalistic with lyrics.

== Music ==
"Mary Anne," like many other songs on the album, features layered harmonies and lush production. Crenshaw compared the song's melodic style to another song he was writing at the time, "Someday, Someway" in that "both have this kind of hypnotic, mantra-like thing that I was getting into. [I was trying to] find the point where the repetition is just right, the point where it creates a hypnotic effect rather than a numbing effect." The song also features a guitar solo. Crenshaw explained the guitar sound on the track, "It's probably six or eight tracks of the Vox 12-string and then maybe four of this Rickenbacker 12-string that I had. It's a big, massive, buzzing wall of 12-string guitars."

== Release and reception ==
"Mary Anne" was first released on the Marshall Crenshaw album in 1982. The song was not released as a single; Crenshaw later confirmed that, despite the song's popularity, it had not been considered for single release at the time. It has also appeared on the compilation album This Is Easy: The Best of Marshall Crenshaw. It has also been covered by the Nitty Gritty Dirt Band; their version was later praised by Crenshaw as "really beautiful." Crenshaw also recorded an acoustic version of the song for the 2008 movie God Is Dead.

Jon Matsumoto of The Los Angeles Times described the song as "melodic" and said that the song is "as fresh and inviting as ever." Timothy Finn of The Kansas City Star called it a "timeless Crenshaw pop gem," while The American Songwriter called it a "classic song." The Washington Post's Brett Anderson said the song was "as timeless as a vintage Chevy—and just as well engineered." Entertainment Weekly praised the song's "spirited melancholy" and named it one of the songs on Crenshaw's first two albums that "sound as invigorating as ever." Roger Catlin of The Hartford Courant named it as a "great song." Rolling Stone rated the song as the 67th best of 1982, concluding, "His first three albums are flawless guitar pop — 32 songs without a single dud. But 'Mary Anne' rules over them all."

The song has since become a fan favorite; Crenshaw recalled, "People have always loved that one; I remember that David Letterman, it was his favorite song of mine back then. ... People just love it, you know? It’s a very pretty song." The song has also become a live favorite for Crenshaw, who stated in 2011, "For a long time I wasn't playing it live, and I'd always get shout-outs for it. So I started playing it again."
