= Cynical Girl =

Single by Marshall Crenshaw

from the album Marshall Crenshaw
- B-side: "Rave On"; "Somebody Like You"
- Released: January 1983
- Recorded: January 1982
- Genre: Power pop; new wave; rock and roll; hard rock
- Label: Warner Bros.
- Songwriter(s): Marshall Crenshaw
- Producer(s): Richard Gottehrer, Marshall Crenshaw

Marshall Crenshaw singles chronology
"There She Goes Again" (1982)	"Cynical Girl" (1983)	"Whenever You're on My Mind" (1983)

"Cynical Girl" is a 1982 song by American rock musician Marshall Crenshaw. The song was released on his 1982 debut album, Marshall Crenshaw. Written as a satire on the "mass culture" that Crenshaw disliked, the song was not based on a specific girl.

"Cynical Girl" was released as the album's third single in the US and as its first single in the UK. Though the song did not chart, it has since become one of Crenshaw's most famous songs.

== Background ==
Crenshaw wrote the music to "Cynical Girl" before the lyrics. He explained, "With me it’s always a piece of music first, and I love the composing part of it so much that I don’t want to complicate it by trying to think of words; I deal with those separately." He recalled that he wrote the music for "Cynical Girl" in "one pass," but that the lyrics took time to come up with.

Crenshaw first came up with the lyrical concept for "Cynical Girl" after being forced to watch an overhead TV while waiting to pay for a traffic ticket. He later reflected that the lyrics had a "humor" and "oddness" to them. The song was not based on a specific girl; Crenshaw explained,

The part about the girl is just kind of off-the-shelf, rock 'n' roll language. There really isn't any girl that I was thinking of in the song. It's really about 'I hate TV.' I'm saying I hate lowest-common-denominator mass-culture bullshit, and that I don't wanna hang around with people who don't. People ask me, 'Did you find the cynical girl yet?' It's not about the girl. It's about the other stuff.

In another interview, Crenshaw explained, "'I hate TV,' ... is an oddball thing to say in a rock 'n' roll song. Whenever I get an idea like that, that's almost too stupid to put in a song, I always put it in."

== Recording ==
Crenshaw recorded most of "Cynical Girl" alone in the studio, when he was the album's sole producer. When Richard Gottehrer was brought in to co-produce, he left the song alone aside from the bass line. Crenshaw explained, "I had this really awful synth bass that I played, and he goes, 'Well, I'll tell ya, everything's fine but the bass; the bass is awful. Just get rid of that, put a bass guitar on, and it'll be great.' So it's a good thing that he came on board and steered me in the right direction on that track." Crenshaw noted Gottehrer's guidance on the song as "one of Richard Gottehrer's really good ideas."

== Release ==
In the United States, "Cynical Girl" was released as the third single from Crenshaw's debut album in January 1983. The B-side of the American single included a cover of Buddy Holly's "Rave On" and the non-album Crenshaw original "Somebody Like You". The single failed to chart, despite becoming a radio hit on college circuits. In the United Kingdom, the song was released as the album's first single, with "You're My Favorite Waste of Time" on the B-side. The single did not chart.

The song has also appeared on the compilation album This Is Easy: The Best of Marshall Crenshaw and the live albums Live …My Truck Is My Home and I've Suffered for My Art...Now It's Your Turn.

== Critical reception ==
In a 1982 review of Marshall Crenshaw for Billboard, Thomas Gabriel praised Crenshaw's guitar playing on the "many delicate layers" of the song. Stewart Mason of AllMusic lauded the song as "a pop song that's absolutely perfect in every way," praising Crenshaw's vocal performance and lyrics as well as Richard Gottehrer's production. Jim Bessman of Billboard called the song a "masterful pop creation" Don Harrison of Richmond Magazine named the song as one of Crenshaw's "pop gems awaiting rediscovery", while Noel Murray of The A.V. Club said that the song has "enough new-wave edge to make Crenshaw sound vital and modern—not just a throwback."

Crenshaw spoke positively of the song in an interview, stating, "People have always really loved that song and identified with it and of course I love that!" In another interview, Crenshaw reflected, "That one’s really unique, and I like it a lot. And it's old now, but for many, many years I thought that the lyrics were really cool, and I dug the humor of it." He also called the song one of the best tracks on his debut album.
