= Marshall Crenshaw (album) =

Studio album by Marshall Crenshaw
- Released: April 28, 1982; August 15, 2000 (Reissue)
- Recorded: January 1982
- Studio: Record Plant (New York City)
- Genres: New wave; power pop
- Length: 34:10
- Labels: Warner Bros. Rhino (Reissue)
- Producers: Richard Gottehrer, Marshall Crenshaw

Marshall Crenshaw chronology
| Marshall Crenshaw (1982) | Field Day (1983) |

Singles from Marshall Crenshaw
- 1. "Someday, Someway" Released: May 1982; 2. "There She Goes Again" Released: September 1982; 3. "Cynical Girl" Released: January 1983

Marshall Crenshaw is the debut studio album by American musician Marshall Crenshaw. It was released on April 28, 1982, by Warner Bros. Records. Crenshaw, a performer in the musical Beatlemania, had begun to write songs for the album while staying in New York. The album was recorded with his backing band and producer Richard Gottehrer, engineer Thom Panunzio, and second engineer Jim Ball.

Marshall Crenshaw was a promising debut for Crenshaw, reaching number 50 in the United States and featuring a hit single in "Someday, Someway." Reviews were overwhelmingly positive, and many of Crenshaw's most famous songs, such as "Cynical Girl," "Mary Anne," and "There She Goes Again," are featured on the album.

== Background ==
In the late 1970s, Marshall Crenshaw moved from his home state of Michigan to New York City to perform in the musical Beatlemania. During this time, Crenshaw began to write songs that later appeared on his debut album, including "Someday, Someway"; he said "While I was on the verge of leaving the show, in Boston, I wrote 'Someday, Someway' and five or six of the other tunes on my first album. I wrote those in my hotel room. That was my next move in life, to be a recording artist." After releasing his debut single "Something's Gonna Happen," on Shake Records, Crenshaw received offers from RCA and Warner Brothers to record and release an album; Crenshaw ultimately chose Warner Brothers due to its more welcoming environment.

Crenshaw also formed a backing band consisting of his brother Robert Crenshaw on drums and Chris Donato on bass. This band recorded with Crenshaw for his first two albums.

== Recording ==
Marshall Crenshaw was recorded with producer Richard Gotterher at the Record Plant in New York. Crenshaw wanted to produce his debut album alone, but Gotterher was brought in by Warner Bros. after sessions stalled; Crenshaw said "We started making our first album and I sort of [BS'd] my way into the producer's chair but it didn't work out. So Richard Gottehrer came in and he helped me make the record." Gotterher, a veteran hit songwriter and record-producer, was managing and producing Robert Gordon when he and Crenshaw first crossed paths, about a year prior to the recording of Marshall Crenshaw.

In addition to Gotterher, Thom Panunzio served as engineer for the album; Crenshaw recalled, "All I can remember is my co-producer, Richard Gottehrer, eating a lot of pasta and me pumping Thom Panunzio, our engineer, for stories about his days working with John Lennon." Gotterher had originally proposed using drummer Anton Fig and bassist Will Lee for the sessions, but Crenshaw insisted on using his band instead, citing the "group identity" the trio had formed. The album was recorded in approximately five weeks, in spite of several Vox lighting on fire.

Marshall Crenshaw features layered performances with clean production. Crenshaw later expressed dissatisfaction with the way the album was produced, saying "That band back then was really slick. Almost too slick. I see the tapes of that now and I think, 'This is a little too polished, almost.' We just rehearsed all the time. We were just playing clubs in the city, but we would still get together twice a week and go over stuff, and I would really drill those guys: 'Here's how the bass drum goes, and put the cymbal crash here.' I was very specific all the time—probably too much so. Now I think it was too much."

== Songs ==
Marshall Crenshaw features several of Crenshaw's most famous songs, such as "Someday, Someway", "There She Goes Again", "Cynical Girl", and "Mary Anne". Crenshaw spoke favorably of the songwriting on the album, saying "The stuff was really well written. There was a discernible viewpoint that came across. It captured something, a statement was being made. We generated a lot of excitement in New York City from grassroots and built it up in less than a year. We had it really nailed down, but things got tricky after that." Despite several comparisons to Buddy Holly, Crenshaw cited Squeeze and Rockpile as the primary influences for the album.

"Someday, Someway" was among the early songs Crenshaw wrote for the album and was inspired by "Lotta Lovin'" by Gene Vincent. "I'll Do Anything" was often played live during this time and features lyrics which Crenshaw described as "a one-to-one conversation with somebody [where there is] one person trying to comfort another person or reassure another person." Crenshaw also said that both "I'll Do Anything" and "Mary Anne" were about "try[ing] not to let your anxieties overwhelm you."

"Cynical Girl" was, according to Crenshaw, "really not about a girl—that's just off-the-shelf rock-and-roll language. To me, what the song says in a funny way is 'I hate brain-dead mass-culture [stuff] and I want to hang around with people who feel the same.' People have always really loved that song and identified with it and of course I love that"

Crenshaw chose not to include his debut single, "Something's Gonna Happen," on the album. He recalled, "I'm glad we didn't re-record it ... I like 'Something's Gonna Happen,' sonically speaking, more than a lot of tracks on the debut album."

== Release and reception ==
Professional ratings
Review scores
| Source | Rating |
|---|---|
| AllMusic | 5/5 stars |
| Christgau's Record Guide | A |
| The Encyclopedia of Popular Music | 4/5 stars |
| MusicHound Rock | 5/5 stars |
| Rolling Stone | 4/5 stars |
| The Rolling Stone Album Guide | 4/5 stars |
| Spin Alternative Record Guide | 9/10 |

Marshall Crenshaw was released in April 1982. The album spent over six months on the Billboard chart, peaking at No. 50, and eventually sold close to 400,000 copies in the United States. Contemporary reviews were glowing, with Rolling Stone calling it "1982's most gorgeous singer-songwriter debut" and claiming that "every song here sounds like a classic." Rolling Stone later included the album in its list of The 100 Best Albums of the Eighties, coming in at number 72.

The album's debut single "Someday, Someway" reached No. 36 on the Billboard Hot 100 in the summer of 1982, as well as No. 31 on the Cash Box singles chart. The single is Crenshaw's highest-charting song. "Cynical Girl" and "There She Goes Again" were released as singles; the latter reached number 110 in the United States.

Despite its initial promise, the album failed to hit platinum, and his follow-up album Field Day was a commercial failure. Crenshaw explained "After the first album didn't go platinum—everybody thought it would; I thought it would—it was '82–'83, and we were out promoting these records. I made both my first two albums just in that space of time. Eighty-four came around, and I thought: 'Here I worked all my life to get to this point and now it's over, right now. It's all over now!"

Musician Jeffrey Foskett include the album on his list of top ten recordings, writing, "Not since Rubber Soul or Pet Sounds was there an LP where every single cut was as good as the previous. The production by Richard Gottehrer and the performances by the band make this a true classic."

== Track listing ==
All tracks are written by Marshall Crenshaw, except where noted.

Side one
| No. | Title | Length |
|---|---|---|
| 1. | "There She Goes Again" | 2:39 |
| 2. | "Someday, Someway" | 2:53 |
| 3. | "Girls..." | 3:04 |
| 4. | "I'll Do Anything" | 3:03 |
| 5. | "Rockin' Around in N.Y.C." | 3:10 |
| 6. | "The Usual Thing" | 3:06 |

Side two
| No. | Title | Length |
|---|---|---|
| 1. | "She Can't Dance" (Crenshaw, Rick Cioffi, Fred Todd) | 2:47 |
| 2. | "Cynical Girl" | 2:37 |
| 3. | "Mary Anne" | 2:57 |
| 4. | "Soldier of Love (Lay Down Your Arms)" (Buzz Cason, Tony Moon) | 2:39 |
| 5. | "Not for Me" | 2:38 |
| 6. | "Brand New Lover" | 2:39 |

A 2000 remastered, reissued version on Rhino/Warner Archives features bonus tracks, which include demos and live tracks.

13. "Starlit Summer Sky" (Demo, 1979) (Crenshaw, Cioffi, Todd) – 2:48
14. "Whenever You're on My Mind" (Demo, 1979) (Crenshaw, Bill Teeley) – 3:02
15. "You're My Favorite Waste of Time" (1979, Marshall Crenshaw & the Handsome, Ruthless and Stupid Band) – 2:38
16. "Somebody Like You" (1980) – 3:17
17. "Rave On!" (Live, 1982) (Sonny West, Bill Tilghman, Norman Petty) – 1:35
18. "The Usual Thing" (Live, 1982) – 3:14
19. "Stop Her on Sight (S.O.S.)" (Live, 1982) (Albert Hamilton, Richard Morris, Charles Hatcher) – 2:45
20. "Look at What I Almost Missed" (Live, 1982) (George Clinton, Tamala Lewis) – 3:58
21. "I've Been Good to You" (Live, 1981) (Smokey Robinson) – 2:55
22. "Brand New Lover (Alternate Version) (hidden track) – 3:01

== Personnel ==
- Marshall Crenshaw – guitar, vocals (bass on bonus-track demos)
- Chris Donato – bass, vocals
- Robert Crenshaw – drums, vocals

Guest musicians

- Tony Garnier – bass
- Richard Gottehrer – percussion
- Michael Osborne – percussion

Album design - Spencer Drate, Judith Salavetz

Photography - Gary Greene
