= What's in the Bag? =

Studio album by Marshall Crenshaw
- Released: July 22, 2003
- Genre: Rock
- Length: 47:43
- Label: Razor & Tie
- Producer: Marshall Crenshaw

Marshall Crenshaw chronology
I've Suffered for My Art...Now It's Your Turn (2001)	What's in the Bag? (2003)	The Definitive Pop Collection (2006)

Professional ratings
Review scores
Source	Rating
AllMusic	3.5/5 stars
Robert Christgau	(2-star Honorable Mention)

What's In The Bag? is the ninth studio album by singer/songwriter Marshall Crenshaw.

== Track listing ==
All songs written by Marshall Crenshaw, except where noted.

1. "Will We Ever?" – 4:06
2. "Where Home Used to Be" – 4:54
3. "Take Me with U" (Prince) – 3:46
4. "From Now Until Then" – 4:06
5. "Despite the Sun" – 4:54
6. "The Spell Is Broken" (Crenshaw, David Cantor) – 4:12
7. "A Few Thousand Days Ago" (Crenshaw, Bill Demaine) – 4:04
8. "Long and Complicated" (Crenshaw, Richard Julian) – 5:35
9. "I'd Rather Be with You" (Bootsy Collins, George Clinton, Gary Lee Cooper) – 4:27
10. "Alone in a Room" – 3:39
11. "AKA A Big Heavy Hot Dog" – 4:00

== Personnel ==
- Marshall Crenshaw – vocals, guitar, bass, drums, percussion, organ, mellotron, mandoguitar
- Diego Voglino – drums
- Tony Scherr – bass
- Chris Cunningham – guitar
- Andy York – guitar, bass, mandoguitar
- Bill Ware – vibraphone
- Jason Crigler – guitar
- Graham Maby – bass
- Tony Beckham – vibraphone
- Greg Leisz – steel guitar
- Jane Scarpantoni – cello
- Eric Ambel – dulcitar, bass
- Tom Teeley – guitar
