= Live ...My Truck Is My Home =

Live …My Truck Is My Home

Live album by Marshall Crenshaw
- Released: 1994
- Recorded: 1982–94
- Genre: Rock
- Length: 50:44
- Label: Razor & Tie
- Producer: Marshall Crenshaw, Will Schillinger

Marshall Crenshaw chronology
Life's Too Short (1991)	Live …My Truck Is My Home (1994)	Miracle of Science (1996)

Professional ratings
Review scores
Source	Rating
AllMusic	3/5 stars
Robert Christgau	A−
The Encyclopedia of Popular Music	2/5 stars

Live …My Truck Is My Home is a live album by singer/songwriter Marshall Crenshaw, which includes performances from 1982 to 1994.

On the surface of the compact disc itself there is a picture of singer Bo Donaldson. Crenshaw relates, “The idea [for a live album] had been kicking around for years. The guy who produced it, Will Schillinger, has been doing our sound for us more or less since day one. He has this giant tape library of stuff we've done over the years, and I just decided I wanted to do it now. You wouldn't know who that picture is—I didn't know when I first saw it. It's a guy named Bo Donaldson [of Heywoods fame]. I just looked at it and said, ‘God, I dig that picture. Let's put it on the CD.’ And we did.”

== Track listing ==
All songs written by Marshall Crenshaw, except where noted.

1. "Fantastic Planet of Love" – 4:39
2. "Wanda and Duane" (Dave Alvin) – 4:18
3. "You're My Favorite Waste of Time" – 3:32
4. "Like a Vague Memory" – 3:18
5. "Tonight" (Rob Tyner, Wayne Kramer, Fred "Sonic" Smith) – 3:11
6. "Calling Out for Love (At Crying Time)" (Crenshaw, Don Dixon) – 4:47
7. "Twine Time" (Andre Williams, Verlie Rice) – 4:07
8. "Julie" (Chip Taylor) – 2:39
9. "Cynical Girl" – 2:51
10. "Have You Seen Her Face" (Chris Hillman) – 2:58
11. "There She Goes Again" – 2:49
12. "Girls…" – 3:06
13. "Knowing Me, Knowing You" (Benny Andersson, Björn Ulvaeus, Stig Anderson) – 4:21
14. "You Should've Been There" (Crenshaw, Leroy Preston) – 4:08

== Personnel ==
- Kenny Aronoff - drums
- Glen Burtnik - guitar, organ, backing vocals
- Marshall Crenshaw - vocals, guitar
- Robert Crenshaw - drums, backing vocals
- Chris Donato - bass, backing vocals
- Steve Holley - drums
- Richard Kennedy - guitar, backing vocals
- Graham Maby - bass, guitar, backing vocals
- Ron Pangborn - drums
- Jules Shear - backing vocals, shaker
