= The 9 Volt Years =

Compilation album by Marshall Crenshaw
- Released: 1998
- Genre: Rock
- Length: 38:58
- Label: Razor & Tie

Marshall Crenshaw chronology
Miracle of Science (1996)	The 9 Volt Years (1998)	#447 (1999)

Professional ratings
Review scores
Source	Rating
Robert Christgau	(neither)

The 9 Volt Years (Battery Powered Home Demos & Curios (1979-198?)) is a compilation of early recordings by Marshall Crenshaw. It includes first versions of Crenshaw's best known songs, including "Someday, Someway" and "You're My Favorite Waste Of Time".

== Track listing ==
All songs written by Marshall Crenshaw, except where noted.

1. "Run Back to You" – 2:32
2. "Someday, Someway" – 2:33
3. "Love Can Be Bad Luck" (Crenshaw, David Was, Don Was) – 3:18
4. "Stay Fabulous" (Crenshaw, Robert Miller) – 2:29
5. "Everyone's in Love with You" (Robert Crenshaw, Marshall Crenshaw) – 2:25
6. "You're My Favorite Waste of Time" – 2:57
7. "Like a Vague Memory" – 3:21
8. "Bruce Is King" – 3:55
9. "That's It, I Quit, I'm Movin' On" (Roy Alfred, Del Serino) – 2:50
10. "She's Not You" (Robert Crenshaw, Don Jones) – 2:49
11. "The Thrill of the Fight" – 0:09
12. "First Love" (Crenshaw, Rick Cioffi, Fred Todd) – 2:22
13. "Something's Gonna Happen" – 2:00
14. "I'm Sorry" (Bo Diddley) – 2:25
15. "Rockin' Around in N.Y.C." – 2:53
