= Blues Is King (song) =

1985 song by American rock musician Marshall Crenshaw

Single by Marshall Crenshaw

from the album Downtown
- Released: 1985
- Genre: Rock; new wave
- Label: Warner Bros.
- Songwriter(s): Marshall Crenshaw
- Producer(s): Mitch Easter and Marshall Crenshaw

Marshall Crenshaw singles chronology
"Little Wild One (No. 5)" (1985)	"Blues Is King" (1985)	"The Distance Between" (1986)

"Blues Is King" is a 1985 song by American rock musician Marshall Crenshaw. The song was released on his 1985 album Downtown. Originally written as an instrumental titled "Bruce Is King," the song features lyrics inspired by the B.B. King album Blues Is King.

Though not released commercially, the song appeared on a 1985 promotional single. The song has since seen positive critical reception, though Crenshaw has expressed disappointment with the song's lyrics.

== Background ==
"Blues Is King" originated as an instrumental titled "Bruce Is King" (named in reference to musician Bruce Springsteen). Crenshaw made this original demo playing Mosrite guitars. "Bruce Is King" was later released on the rarities album The 9 Volt Years.

Crenshaw recalled struggling to come up with lyrics for the song; he explained, "I was really struggling to come up with an idea. I thought of this old B.B. King album title, Blues Is King. I made that the title of the song." Crenshaw attempted to keep the lyrics "deliberately ambiguous, where I said it doesn't matter, let's just make these sounds and it'll come out all right." The song was produced by Mitch Easter and Crenshaw, making it the only song on Downtown not produced by T Bone Burnett.

== Release ==
"Blues Is King" was released as the third track on Crenshaw's third album, Downtown, in 1985. Though it was not released commercially as a single, a promotional single with the song on both sides was released that same year to DJs. The song has also appeared on the compilation This Is Easy: The Best of Marshall Crenshaw.

== Reception ==
Joe Sasfy of The Washington Post described the song as "vintage Crenshaw." Scott Bernarde of Sun-Sentinel wrote, "Crenshaw, the '80s king of '50s and '60s reverb and twang, puts those effects to good use" on the song.

Crenshaw has mixed feelings about the song, praising its music but expressing dislike for its lyrics. He explained, "I was never 100 percent happy with the lyrics, but I always thought the music was really beautiful, and that the track was nice, too." Crenshaw does not perform the song live often; he said in 1991, "I can't sing that song now because it's a joke to me. That`s the point. I like clear, plain language."
