= Good Evening =

Studio album by Marshall Crenshaw
- Released: June 27, 1989
- Genre: Rock
- Length: 37:49
- Label: Warner Bros.
- Producer: David Kershenbaum, Paul McKenna

Marshall Crenshaw chronology
Mary Jean & 9 Others (1987)	Good Evening (1989)	Life's Too Short (1991)

Professional ratings
Review scores
Source	Rating
AllMusic	2.5/5 stars
Robert Christgau	A−
The Encyclopedia of Popular Music	3/5 stars
The Rolling Stone Album Guide	3/5 stars

Good Evening is a 1989 album by Marshall Crenshaw. Although critically well-received, it failed to chart.

Crenshaw attributed Traveling Wilburys' debut album as an influence for the album's sound. The album was Crenshaw's last for Warner Bros. Records and, due to his soured relationship with the label, he chose to fill the album with covers. He recalled, "I wasn't writing many songs back then. I didn't want to write any songs for the album, because I had very little faith and I couldn't get myself to make that kind of commitment to the record. I decided to save my energy."

The album's opening track, "You Should've Been There", has a longer intro on this album than on Rhino's compilation, This Is Easy: The Best of Marshall Crenshaw. The album includes the first commercial release of the Diane Warren song "Some Hearts", which became a hit in 2005 in a version by country singer Carrie Underwood. Crenshaw later described the experience of covering a Warren song as "strange."

== Track listing ==
1. "You Should've Been There" (Leroy Preston, Marshall Crenshaw) – 3:52
2. "Valerie" (Richard Thompson) – 3:35
3. "She Hates to Go Home" (Leroy Preston, Marshall Crenshaw) – 4:46
4. "Someplace Where Love Can't Find Me" (John Hiatt) – 4:01
5. "Radio Girl" (Kurt Neumann, Marshall Crenshaw, Sam Llanas) – 4:04
6. "On the Run" (Marshall Crenshaw) – 3:14
7. "Live It Up" (Chris Jasper, Isley Brothers) – 3:36
8. "Some Hearts" (Diane Warren) – 4:21
9. "Whatever Way the Wind Blows" (Marshall Crenshaw) – 3:25
10. "Let Her Dance" (Bobby Fuller) – 2:55

== Personnel ==
- Marshall Crenshaw – vocals, guitar
- Bob Marlette – keyboards, bass, drums
- Sonny Landreth – slide guitar
- David Lindley – slide guitar, fiddle, mandolin
- Graham Maby – bass
- Steve Conn – keyboards
- Kenny Aronoff – drums, percussion
- James Burton – guitar on "Whatever Way the Wind Blows"
- Eric Pressley – bass on "Whatever Way the Wind Blows"
- J.D. Maness – steel guitar on "Whatever Way the Wind Blows"
- The Bodeans, Robert Crenshaw, Patti McCarron, Syd Straw – background vocals
