= Jaggedland =

Studio album by Marshall Crenshaw
- Released: 2009
- Genre: Rock
- Length: 46:27
- Label: 429 Records
- Producer: Marshall Crenshaw, Jerry Boys, Stewart Lerman

Marshall Crenshaw chronology
The Definitive Pop Collection (2006)	Jaggedland (2009)

Professional ratings
Review scores
Source	Rating
AllMusic	3.5/5 stars
Robert Christgau	(3-star Honorable Mention)

Jaggedland is the tenth studio album by the rock artist Marshall Crenshaw. It was released in 2009 on 429 Records.

== Track listing ==
All songs written by Marshall Crenshaw, except where noted.

1. "Right on Time" – 4:50
2. "Passing Through" (Crenshaw, Kelley Ryan) – 3:22
3. "Someone Told Me" – 4:29
4. "Stormy River" (Crenshaw, Richard Julian) – 5:02
5. "Gasoline Baby" – 1:49
6. "Never Coming Down" – 3:38
7. "Long Hard Road" – 3:09
8. "Jaggedland" – 2:41
9. "Sunday Blues" – 4:13
10. "Just Snap Your Fingers" (Crenshaw, Ryan) – 3:40
11. "Eventually" – 4:07
12. "Live and Learn" (Crenshaw, Matt Bair, Dan Bern) – 5:27

== Personnel ==
- Marshall Crenshaw - vocals, guitar, bass, drums, percussion, keyboards
- Jim Keltner – drums, percussion
- Sebastian Steinberg – bass
- Greg Leisz – steel guitar, dobro, bass
- Emil Richards – vibraphone, tambourine
- Mike Viola – background vocals
- Wayne Kramer – guitar
- Diego Voglino – drums
- Jason Crigler – slide guitar
- Ben Rubin – bass
- Rob Morseburger – keyboards
- Deborah Assael – cello
- Sarah Worden – viola, violin
- Todd Chalfant - Photography
