= Our Town (Marshall Crenshaw song) =

1983 song by Marshall Crenshaw

- "US Remix" Our Town EP

Song by Marshall Crenshaw

from the album Field Day
- Released: June 1983
- Recorded: February 1983
- Studio: Record Plant, New York City
- Genre: New wave
- Label: Warner Bros.
- Songwriter(s): Marshall Crenshaw
- Producer(s): Steve Lillywhite

Marshall Crenshaw singles chronology
| "Whenever You're on My Mind" (1983) | "Our Town EP" (1983, UK) | "Little Wild One (No. 5)" (1985) |

"Our Town" is a 1983 song by American rock musician Marshall Crenshaw. The song was released on his 1983 album Field Day. Written as an ode to Crenshaw's hometown at the time, New York City, the song features a melody inspired by Babs Cooper's version of "Honest I Do," a record that Crenshaw had heard in his childhood.

Released on Field Day 1983, the song also served as the title track to a "US Remix" EP released in the UK the same year—Crenshaw later panned the remixes for watering down the production. The song has since seen positive critical reception.

== Background ==
Crenshaw said in an interview that "Our Town" is "just a song about being homesick for what was our home then, New York City." Crenshaw later recalled that the song was written quickly, after having not written a song in a while. Crenshaw said that the topic of New York City was something he "could seize on back then."

Melodically, "Our Town" was inspired by Babs Cooper's version of the Innocents' song "Honest I Do," a song that Crenshaw remembered listening to at his house when he was young. Crenshaw described "Honest I Do" as a "really beautiful, kinda girly rock 'n' roll record" and said that "Our Town" features a "sped up" version of the melody from "Honest I Do."

== Release ==
"Our Town" was first released as the second track on Crenshaw's sophomore album Field Day in June 1983. It has since appeared on the compilation album This Is Easy: The Best of Marshall Crenshaw.

Though not released as a single, "Our Town" was released as the titular lead track to a "US Remix" EP that was released in the UK. This EP featured remixed versions of songs from Field Day done by John Luongo, rather than Field Day producer Steve Lillywhite, as well as a cover of Elvis Presley's "Little Sister." Crenshaw later disavowed the remixes and said, "I had no participation in that and it didn't come out anything like I wanted it to. I wanted to do remixes with a guy named François Kevorkian, who did a lot of remixes that were psychedelic-sounding. I wanted him to take the tracks further out than Field Day. The guy Warners ultimately got to do it was sort of pushed into taming the sound."

== Reception ==
"Our Town" has seen positive critical reception since its release. Entertainment Weekly praised the song's "walls of hooky sound" and named it one of the songs on Crenshaw's first two albums that "sound as invigorating as ever." Karen Schlosberg of Creem lauded the song's "almost tangibly aching longing." AllMusic named the song as a highlight of Field Day.

Crenshaw himself spoke positively of the song, calling it a "nice one."
