= Mike Sanchez =

British singer, pianist and songwriter

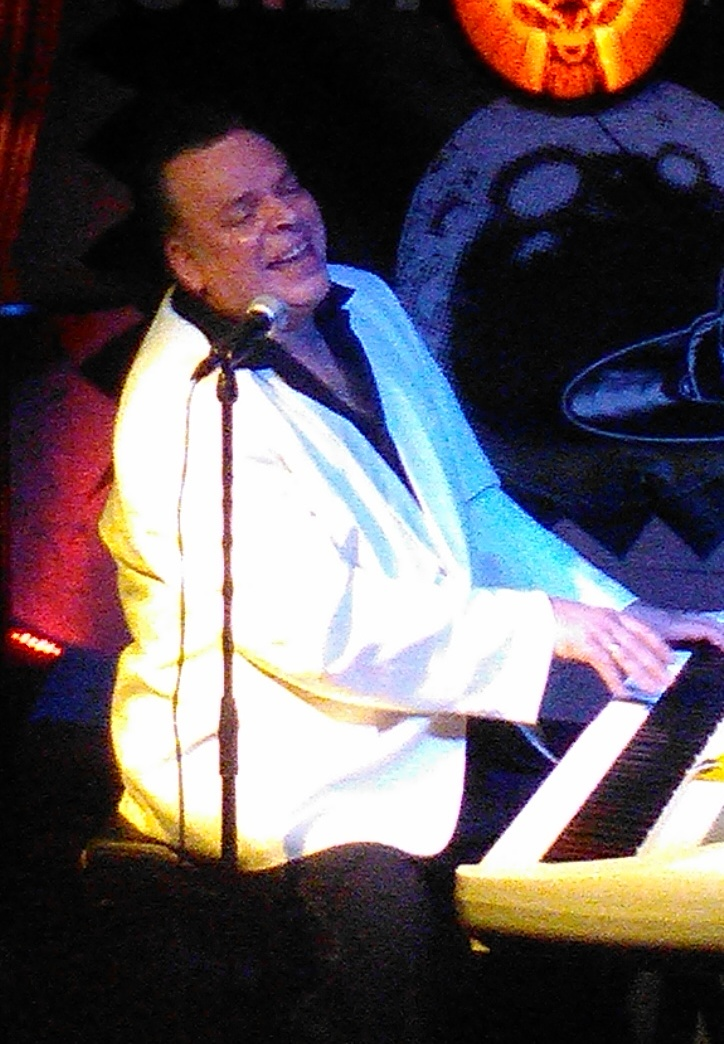
- Sanchez performing in 2017

Background information
- Born: Jesus Miguel Sanchez; 17 February 1964 (age 62); Hackney, London, England
- Genres: Rhythm and blues, rock 'n' roll, boogie woogie, blues, rockabilly
- Occupations: Singer, pianist, songwriter
- Instruments: Vocals, piano, guitar
- Years active: 1982–present
- Label: Doopin Music
- Website: mikesanchez.co.uk

Jesus Miguel "Mike" Sanchez (born 17 February 1964) is a British rhythm and blues singer, pianist and songwriter. He is known for his work with the Big Town Playboys and Bill Wyman's Rhythm Kings, and for his solo career.

Sanchez, of Spanish-English heritage, was born in Hackney in the East End of London.

== Discography ==
- Playboy Boogie!, Big Town Playboys (Making Waves/Spindrift, 1985)
- Now Appearing, Big Town Playboys (Blue Horizon, 1989)
- Crazy Legs, Big Town Playboys with Jeff Beck (Epic, 1993)
- Hip Joint, Big Town Playboys (Blue Horizon, 1994)
- Ready to Rock...!, The Big Six (Vinyl Japan, 1995)
- Off the Clock: Live, Big Town Playboys (Eagle, 1997) 2-CD
- Just a Game, Mike Sanchez (MS-001, 1997)
- Struttin' Our Stuff, Bill Wyman's Rhythm Kings (RCA Victor/BMG Classics, 1997)
- Six Pack [7-song EP], Big Town Playboys (BTP, 1998)
- Anyway the Wind Blows, Bill Wyman's Rhythm Kings (RCA Victor/BMG Classics, 1998)
- Just Can't Afford It, Mike Sanchez (MS-002, 1999)
- Blue Boy, Mike Sanchez (MS-003, 2001)
- On the Road Again, Bootleg Kings (Ripple, 2002)
- Women & Cadillacs, Mike Sanchez with 'Knock Out Greg & Blue Weather' (Doopin', 2003)
- You Better Dig It!, Mike Sanchez (Doopin', 2008)
- Babes and Buicks, Mike Sanchez with 'The Beat From Palookaville' (Doopin', 2010)
- Almost Grown, Mike Sanchez (featuring Imelda May) (Doopin', 2012)
- So Many Routes with Albert Lee (Doopin', 2014)
- 12 Original Scorchers (Doopin', 2019) compilation
- Hey Now! (Doopin', 2025)
