= Robert Crenshaw =

American drummer

- Born: Detroit, Michigan, U.S.
- Genre: Rock
- Occupations: Musician, robotics instructor, author
- Instruments: Drums, backing vocals
- Years active: 1981–present

Robert Crenshaw is an American drummer, recording artist, author, and robotics instructor/trainer. He is known primarily for his solo recordings and his years in his brother Marshall Crenshaw's band.

== Biography ==
=== Early years ===
Crenshaw grew up outside of Detroit in Berkley, Michigan. His parents and three brothers (Marshall, Mitchell, and John) were musically inclined. He was gifted his first drums at age 9, a red Trixon set. Crenshaw's first band Rasputin included younger brothers of members of Marshall's band Astigafa. In his teens he was drummer for Denny and the Robots, an oldies band. In 1976, Crenshaw and his lifelong friend Stewart Simon studied recording engineering at the Institute of Audio Research in New York City.

=== Marshall Crenshaw Band ===
After Marshall Crenshaw finished his involvement in Beatlemania, he recruited Robert as drummer for his new band, along with bassist Chris Donato. Marshall signed with Warner Brothers in 1981, and the trio recorded the album Marshall Crenshaw.

Robert also drummed on Marshall's follow-up album Field Day in 1983, but only appeared on two tracks on Downtown. He was back on drums for 1987's Mary Jean & 9 Others, along with Graham Maby on bass.

=== Recordings ===
On Crenshaw's first three albums: Full-Length Stereo Recordings, Victory Songs and Dog Days, Crenshaw recruited Dixon, Marti Jones, and Jamie Hoover, among others. For 2014's Friends, Family, and Neighbors, Crenshaw was assisted by his brother John, a sound mixer, producer Don Dixon, bassist Maby, and engineer Stewart Simon.

=== Cinema ===
In 1986, Robert and Marshall Crenshaw played members of the reunion band at the beginning of the film Peggy Sue Got Married.

=== Memoir ===
In June 2019, Crenshaw published his memoir, "My Mythological Narrative A Rock Odyssey." The book chronicles Crenshaw's life and experiences including growing up in Berkley, Michigan, playing drums for brother, Marshall's band, and interactions with musicians such as Tina Turner, Joe Jackson, and Hall and Oates.

=== Personal life ===
Besides performing music whenever possible, Crenshaw is a curriculum writer and robotics instructor in the automation industry. He also wrote a mechatronics curriculum.

== Discography ==
=== Solo recordings ===
- 1999: Full-Length Stereo Recordings (Gadfly)
- 2000: Victory Songs (Gadfly)
- 2003: Dog Dreams (Gadfly)
- 2014: Friends, Family, and Neighbors (self-released)

=== EPs ===
- 2012: Atheist Christmas (self-released)

=== With Marshall Crenshaw ===
- 1982: Marshall Crenshaw (Warner Bros.)
- 1983: Field Day (Warner Bros.)
- 1985: Downtown (Warner Bros.)
- 1987: Mary Jean & 9 Others (Warner Bros.)
- 1989: Good Evening (Warner Bros.)
- 1994: Live …My Truck Is My Home (Razor & Tie)

=== Also appears on ===
- 1986: Marti Jones – Match Game (A&M)
- 2003: Ronnie Spector – Something's Gonna Happen (Bad Girl Sounds)
