= Day One (band) =

English band

Day One is an English band from Bristol, formed in 1998, and consisting of Phelim Byrne and Matthew Hardwidge. The band was originally signed to Virgin/Melancolik, the record label started by Massive Attack. Their début album, Ordinary Man, was released in 2000. Music from the LP was used in film soundtracks such as Cruel Intentions, The Big Tease and TV productions such as Six Feet Under, Trigger Happy TV and advertising campaigns including Adidas and Caterpillar.

Their second album, Probably Art, was released in October 2007. The song "Bad Before Good", from Probably Art, was featured in an episode of the second season of Skins, and the US film Easy A. Their song "Cosmopolita" appeared on the US series Cashmere Mafia.

The duo finished their third album Intellectual Property in Los Angeles, with Mario Caldato Jr of Beastie boys fame, and mastered by Robert Carranza. In June 2015 the band announced that the new LP would be exclusively unveiled through the Bowers & Wilkins / Society of Sound website on 18 June 2015. The LP was commercially released in Japan through Rush! Production in September 2016 and was released worldwide on 4 November 2016.
