= Crazy Legs (album) =

Studio album by Jeff Beck and the Big Town Playboys
- Released: 29 June 1993
- Studios: Townhouse, London
- Genre: Rockabilly
- Length: 41:08
- Label: Epic
- Producer: Stuart Colman

Jeff Beck chronology
Frankie's House (1992)	Crazy Legs (1993)	Who Else! (1999)

Professional ratings
Review scores
Source	Rating
AllMusic	2/5 stars
Rolling Stone	4/5 stars

Crazy Legs is a studio album by Jeff Beck and the Big Town Playboys, released on 29 June 1993. The recording is an album of Gene Vincent songs. The album is considered to be a tribute to Gene Vincent and His Blue Caps, and in particular to Vincent's early guitarist Cliff Gallup, who Beck recognized as his biggest influence.

The album peaked at No. 171 on the Billboard 200 chart.

== Track listing ==
1. "Race with the Devil" (Gene Vincent, Sheriff Tex Davis) – 2:00
2. "Cruisin'" (Gene Vincent, Sheriff Tex Davis) – 2:22
3. "Crazy Legs" (Danny Wolfe, Jerry Reed) – 2:03
4. "Double Talkin' Baby" (Danny Wolfe, Jerry Reed) – 2:15
5. "Woman Love" (Jack Rhodes) – 2:35
6. "Lotta Lovin'" (Bernice Bedwell) – 2:04
7. "Catman" (Gene Vincent, Sheriff Tex Davis) – 2:24
8. "Pink Thunderbird" (Paul Peek, Sheriff Tex Davis) – 2:30
9. "Baby Blue" (Gene Vincent, Bobby Jones) – 2:36
10. "You Better Believe" (Cliff Gallup) – 2:09
11. "Who Slapped John?" (Gene Vincent, Sheriff Tex Davis) – 1:55
12. "Say Mama" (Johnny Earl, Johnny Meeks) – 2:13
13. "Red Blue Jeans and a Pony Tail" (Jack Rhodes, Sheriff Tex Davis) – 2:18
14. "Five Feet of Lovin'" (Buck Peddy, Mel Tillis) – 2:11
15. "B-I-Bickey-Bi-Bo-Bo-Go" (Don Carter, Dub Nalls, Jack Rhodes) – 2:12
16. "Blues Stay Away from Me" (Alton Delmore, Henry Glover, Rabon Delmore, Wayne Raney) – 2:24
17. "Pretty Pretty Baby" (Danny Wolfe) – 2:26
18. "Hold Me, Hug Me, Rock Me" (Gene Vincent, Sheriff Tex Davis) – 2:15

== Personnel ==
- Jeff Beck - lead guitar

The Big Town Playboys

- Mike Sanchez - vocals, piano
- Adrian Utley - rhythm guitar
- Ian Jennings - upright bass, backing vocals
- Clive Deamer - drums, backing vocals

with:

- Leo Green - tenor saxophone on "Say Mama"
- Nick Lunt - baritone saxophone on "Say Mama"
- Tony Rivers - backing vocals on "Baby Blue"

Technical

- Leif Mases - engineer
- David Saunders & Lance Miles - Studio & Backline Techs
- Stan Watts - cover illustration

== Charts ==
Chart (1993)	Peak position
Australian Albums (ARIA)	190
Japanese Albums (Oricon)	51
US Billboard 200	171

== Additional notes ==
Catalogue: (CD) Epic 53562
