= Heart Beat 86 =

1986 benefit concert

Front cover for the Heart Beat 86 charity concert programme

Heart Beat 86 was a benefit concert staged at the National Exhibition Centre near Birmingham, England, on 15 March 1986. It was organised by Bev Bevan to raise money for Birmingham Children's Hospital.

Tickets for the sold-out concert cost £15.50 each (£12.00 being a "voluntary" donation). The show started at 3pm, with musicians and bands mostly from Birmingham performing until late into the evening. The concert saw performances from Steve Gibbons, The Rockin' Berries, The Move, Ruby Turner, The Applejacks, and The Fortunes. Roy Wood performed his festive hit "I Wish It Could Be Christmas Every Day". Denny Laine sang "Go Now" and performed "Mull of Kintyre", which he co wrote. Robert Plant performed with the group Big Town Playboys. UB40 played the song "Red Red Wine", The Moody Blues did "Nights in White Satin", and ELO added "Don't Bring Me Down". The finale featured George Harrison and all the artists on stage, jamming to the standard "Johnny B. Goode".

Compères for the show were local comedian Jasper Carrott and Peter Powell, with appearances by Noddy Holder and Jim Davidson.

In the concert programme there was a good will message from Live Aid founder Bob Geldof, which finished with him writing "I send you all very best of luck and hope that you achieve your aims".

A single, "Action" by the Tandy Morgan Band, was released to raise money for the event.

== Set list ==
The Steve Gibbons Band

- "Share It With You"
- "Till The Well Runs Dry"
- "BSA"

Denny Laine

- "Go Now"
- "Mull Of Kintyre"

The Fortunes

- "Let It Be Me"
- "You've Got Your Troubles"

Roy Wood

- "See My Baby Jive"
- "Are You Ready To Rock"
- "I Wish It Could Be Christmas Every Day"

UB40 and Ruby Turner

- "I Got U Babe"

Applejacks

- "Tell Me When"

Robert Plant and Big Town Playboys

- "She Walks Right In"
- "Come On"
- "Mellow Saxophone"

The Rockin' Berries

- "He's In Town"

Electric Light Orchestra

- "Twilight"
- "Evil Woman"
- "Livin' Thing"
- "Telephone Line"
- Rock Medley: "Ma-Ma-Ma Belle", "Do Ya", "Rockaria!"
- Pop Medley: "Sweet Talkin' Woman", "Confusion"
- "Turn To Stone"
- "Rock 'N' Roll Is King"
- "Calling America"
- "Mr. Blue Sky"
- "Hold On Tight"
- "Don't Bring Me Down"
- "Roll Over Beethoven"

The Moody Blues

- "Tuesday Afternoon"
- "Question"
- "Nights In White Satin"

George Harrison and Friends

- "Johnny B. Goode"
