= Marshall Crenshaw =

American musician (born 1953)

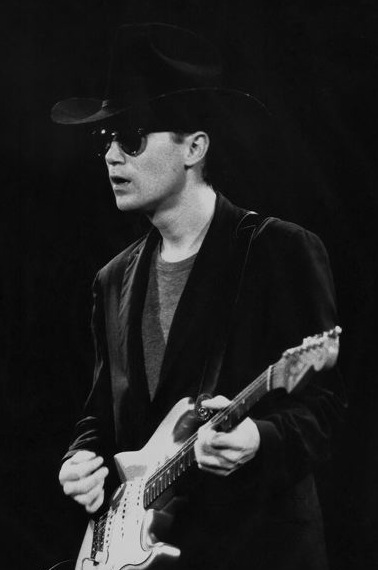
- Crenshaw performing in 1987

Background information
- Born: Marshall Howard Crenshaw; November 11, 1953 (age 72); Detroit, Michigan U.S.
- Genres: Rock; power pop; new wave; roots rock; country rock; college rock
- Occupations: Musician, singer, songwriter
- Instruments: Vocals, guitar, bass, keyboards, drums, percussion
- Years active: 1981–present
- Labels: Warner Bros. Records, Rhino Records, Razor and Tie, Red River, 429 Records
- Website: marshallcrenshaw.com

Marshall Howard Crenshaw (born November 11, 1953) is an American musician, singer, songwriter, and guitarist best known for hit songs such as "Someday, Someway", a US top 40 hit in 1982, "Cynical Girl", and "Whenever You're on My Mind". He is also the co-author of one of the biggest radio hits of the 1990s, Gin Blossoms's "Til I Hear It from You". His music has roots in classic soul music and Buddy Holly, to whom Crenshaw was often compared in the early days of his career, and whom he portrayed in the 1987 film La Bamba.

Born in Detroit, Crenshaw performed in the musical Beatlemania before releasing his self-titled album in 1982. Crenshaw could not replicate the commercial success of Marshall Crenshaw and follow-up Field Day (1983) with later albums. Crenshaw has also contributed songs to other artists, writing singles for Kirsty MacColl and Gin Blossoms. A quote from Trouser Press summed up Marshall Crenshaw's early career: "Although he was seen as a latter-day Buddy Holly at the outset, he soon proved too talented and original to be anyone but himself."

== Early life ==
Crenshaw grew up in the northern Detroit suburb of Berkley. His brother, Robert, joined his touring band during the 1980s. He graduated from Berkley High School in Berkley in June 1971.

He began playing guitar at age 10. During and after high school he led the band ASTIGFA (an acronym for "a splendid time is guaranteed for all", a lyric from The Beatles' "Being For The Benefit of Mr. Kite"). He got his first break in 1978, playing John Lennon in the musical Beatlemania, first as an understudy in New York, then in the West Coast company, and in a national touring company. He left the show in February 1980.

== Career ==
=== 1980–1985 ===
After launching a trio in New York with brother Robert on drums and Chris Donato on bass, Crenshaw recorded his debut single, "Something's Gonna Happen," for Alan Betrock's Shake Records in 1981. He then signed to Warner Bros. Records, crediting its welcoming environment as instrumental in his decision.

Crenshaw's eponymous first album reached number 50 on the American album charts in 1982 and included his signature US hit, "Someday, Someway". Neo-rockabilly musician Robert Gordon had recorded the song in 1981, reaching number 76; Crenshaw's own version made number 36 the next year, becoming his only solo Billboard top 40 hit; the single would also reach number 31 on the Cashbox charts and number 25 on the Billboard Mainstream Rock chart. Other songs from the album, including "There She Goes Again," "Cynical Girl," and "Mary Anne," have since become fan favorites. Crenshaw himself later expressed a dislike for the album's production, though the album saw critical acclaim and was ranked by Rolling Stone as one of the top 100 albums of the 1980s.

His second album, Field Day, was released in June 1983 with a bigger production courtesy of producer Steve Lillywhite which divided opinion at the time. Despite positive critical reception, the album was a commercial disappointment, charting lower than his debut at number 52. Despite Crenshaw's enthusiasm for the song, lead single "Whenever You're on My Mind" failed to reach the Hot 100, peaking third on the Bubbling Under charts. Crenshaw later defended the album's production, criticizing the UK-released U.S. Remix EP of watered-down alternate mixes of the album tracks "Our Town", "For Her Love" (in standard and extended versions) and "Monday Morning Rock."

Due to the commercial decline of Field Day, Crenshaw's relationship with Warner Bros. began to deteriorate and he sought to change his sound on his third album. 1985's Downtown featured a rootsier sound and was stewarded by producer T Bone Burnett (except for "Blues Is King", produced by Mitch Easter). The album reached number 110 on the Billboard chart.

=== 1986–1996 ===
In 1986, Crenshaw and his band made a feature appearance playing in the high school reunion scenes in Francis Ford Coppola's film Peggy Sue Got Married, and contributed "You Belong to Me" to the soundtrack album. Crenshaw also portrayed Buddy Holly in the 1987 Ritchie Valens biopic La Bamba, performing his cover of Holly's "Crying, Waiting, Hoping" on screen and on the soundtrack album. The album reached number one on Billboard and was certified double platinum. Also in 1986, Owen Paul's recording of "You're My Favorite Waste of Time" reached number three in the UK and was awarded a Silver Disc. Crenshaw had written the song in 1979 backstage at the Stanley Theater in Pittsburgh, while appearing there with “Beatlemania”.

In 1987, Crenshaw released his fourth album, Mary Jean & 9 Others, produced by Don Dixon and featuring Joe Jackson Band bassist Graham Maby on bass. His final album for Warner Bros. in 1989, Good Evening, included several cover songs, a decision Crenshaw attributed to his lack of faith in the album and his label. Good Evening featured the first released version of Diane Warren's "Some Hearts", later covered by Carrie Underwood.

In 1989, he compiled a collection of Capitol Records country performers of the 1950s and 1960s called Hillbilly Music...Thank God, Vol. 1. In 1993, he made an appearance in the TV show The Adventures of Pete and Pete as a guitar-playing meter reader, and in 1994, he published a book as editor and contributor, Hollywood Rock: A Guide to Rock 'n' Roll in the Movies. In 1995, he appeared in the music video for Yo La Tengo's single Tom Courtenay.

Crenshaw released two more studio albums during this period, Life's Too Short (1991) on MCA Records and the self-produced and largely self-performed Miracle of Science (1996) on the independent label Razor & Tie. Life's Too Short featured "Better Back Off", which reached number 17 on Billboard's Alternative Songs Chart. Crenshaw also released the concert album Live …My Truck Is My Home on Razor & Tie in 1994.

In 1995, Crenshaw co-wrote "Til I Hear It from You" with Jesse Valenzuela and Robin Wilson of the Gin Blossoms. As the band's soundtrack contribution to the cult film Empire Records, the song played over the closing credits and became a hit single in the US, reaching number 9. Crenshaw was among those who received a Gold record for the film's soundtrack album.

=== 1997–present ===
Crenshaw has released three more studio albums since 1997: #447 (1999), What's in the Bag? (2003), and Jaggedland (2009). In 2015, he released #392: The EP Collection, a collection of EPs he had released between 2013 and 2015. In 2004 he played guitar as a special guest with the reunited members of the MC5.

Crenshaw penned the title track from the 2007 film Walk Hard starring John C. Reilly; the song, as sung by Reilly, was nominated for a Golden Globe Award for Best Original Song, and a Grammy. From 2011 until a hiatus in 2017, Crenshaw hosted a radio show called The Bottomless Pit on WFUV in New York, featuring his vast collection of recorded music. The show came to a close for a variety of reasons, including work on a documentary about producer Tom Wilson, though select episodes are now archived and hosted on Crenshaw's official website.

In 2013, Marshall joined his young friend Viktor Huganet in France, recorded in studio a few songs and played in Paris. Crenshaw continues to perform about 40-50 concerts a year, most of them within driving distance of his family home. Crenshaw himself has dubbed these shows part of "the NPR singer-songwriter circuit". Crenshaw has also performed as a guest vocalist for the Smithereens since the 2017 death of their lead singer Pat DiNizio. Crenshaw alternates touring duties with Robin Wilson of the Gin Blossoms and other guest lead vocalists.

Since 2022, Crenshaw has toured with a regular backing band celebrating his "40 Years in Showbiz". The band consists of Fernando Perdomo on guitar and vocals, Derrick Anderson on bass and vocals, and Mark Ortmann on drums.

Marshall released a new album in 2025, From the Hellhole... which was also released as a three-sided LP set.

== Legacy ==
Crenshaw has been lauded by critics as being one of the key musicians of the new wave and power pop genres, although he has expressed a dislike for the latter connection, stating, "Some of the stuff I've done you could call power pop, but the term does have sort of a dodgy connotation." Crenshaw has named 1950s and 60s-era top 40 music as his greatest influence, saying, "I hold that music and that kind of pop approach in really high regard. I have those records in my head. They really won't go away." Crenshaw has frequented comparisons to Buddy Holly. Crenshaw said of Holly:

I've been a Buddy Holly fan all my life. The joy still comes across in his music. It's really got its own je ne sais quoi. It really stands apart from a lot of '50s rock, because it conveys a sense of intimacy. I think it's because it was made in this little building on the side of a highway late at night with this isolated group of people.

In 2014, Marshall Crenshaw was voted into the Michigan Rock and Roll Legends Hall of Fame. Many notable artists have recorded cover versions of Crenshaw's songs including Lou Ann Barton, Ronnie Spector, Robert Gordon, Marti Jones, Bette Midler, and S Club. Scottish musician Owen Paul had an international hit with his version of Crenshaw's "You're My Favorite Waste of Time" in 1986, peaking at number 3 in the UK singles charts. Gin Blossoms singer Robin Wilson cited Crenshaw as an inspiration, "A few years back, I dug up one of Marshall's records and was listening to it. I thought, 'This is how I sing. This is what I'm shooting for.'"

== Discography ==
Studio albums

Year	Title	Peak chart positions	
Year	Title	US	SWE
1982	Marshall Crenshaw	50	44
1983	Field Day	52	49
1985	Downtown	113	—
1987	Mary Jean & 9 Others	—	—
1989	Good Evening	—	—
1991	Life's Too Short	—	—
1996	Miracle of Science	—	—
1999	#447	—	—
2003	What's in the Bag?	—	—
2009	Jaggedland	—	—
2025	From the Hellhole	—	—
"—" denotes releases that did not chart.

Vinyl reissues

- Field Day/US Remix EP - 2x vinyl reissue (10/2017)

EPs

- US Remix (1984)
- I Don't See You Laughing Now (2012)
- Stranger and Stranger (2013)
- Drivin' and Dreamin' (2013)
- Red Wine (2014)
- Move Now (2014)
- Grab the Next Train (2015)

Live albums

- WRIF LIVE at Hart Plaza - Rare Detroit radio station promo (vinyl only) - Performed "Soldier of Love", an Arthur Alexander song
- Live …My Truck Is My Home (1994)
- I've Suffered for My Art...Now It's Your Turn (2001)
- Marshall Crenshaw: Greatest Hits Acoustic (2002 BMG Special Products)
- Live From the Stone Pony (2003) - Six song bonus audio disc from the King Biscuit DVD of the same name
- Thank You, Rock Fans!! (2017, Run Out Groove) vinyl only of June 4, 1982 performance at the Keystone in San Francisco
- The Wild Exciting Sounds of Marshall Crenshaw: Live in the 20th and 21st Century (2021)

Compilation albums

- A Collection [promo only release] (1991)
- The 9 Volt Years (1998)
- This Is Easy: The Best of Marshall Crenshaw (2000)
- 14 High Class Tunes (2001 Bug Music Promo)
- The Definitive Pop Collection (2006)
- #392: The EP Collection (2015)

Singles

Year	Song	Peak chart positions				Album
Year	Song	US	US CB	US Rock	AUS	Album
1981	"Something's Gonna Happen"	—	—	—	—	Single only
1982	"Someday, Someway"	36	31	25	57	Marshall Crenshaw
1982	"Cynical Girl"	—	—	—	—	Marshall Crenshaw
1982	"There She Goes Again"	(Note: Though it did not chart on the Billboard Hot 100, "There She Goes Again" reached number ten on the Bubbling Under charts in the US.)	—	—	—	Marshall Crenshaw
1983	"Whenever You're on My Mind"	(Note: Though it did not chart on the Billboard Hot 100, "Whenever You're on My Mind" reached number three on the Bubbling Under charts in the US.)	—	23	—	Field Day
1983	"Our Town"	—	—	—	—	Field Day
1985	"Little Wild One (No. 5)"	—	—	—	—	Downtown
1985	"Blues Is King"	—	—	—	—	Downtown
1986	"The Distance Between"	—	—	—	—	Downtown
1987	"Mary Jean"	—	—	—	—	Mary Jean & 9 Others
1987	"This Is Easy"	—	—	—	—	Mary Jean & 9 Others
1989	"Some Hearts"	—	—	—	140	Good Evening
1991	"Better Back Off"	—	—	—	—	Life's Too Short
"—" denotes releases that did not chart or were not released in that territory.
