= 392: The EP Collection =

1. 392: The EP Collection

Compilation album by Marshall Crenshaw
- Released: August 21, 2015
- Recorded: 2012–2015
- Genre: Rock
- Length: 54:52
- Label: Red River
- Producer: Marshall Crenshaw

Marshall Crenshaw chronology
Grab The Next Train (2015)	#392: The EP Collection (2015)

Professional ratings
Review scores
Source	Rating
AllMusic	3.5/5 stars

#392: The EP Collection is a Marshall Crenshaw compilation album containing tracks from a series of six previously released, vinyl-only EPs, completed between April 2012 and April 2015, plus two bonus tracks. The first six tracks are new, original Crenshaw compositions. The next six tracks find Crenshaw covering songs by a diverse group of artists (The Move, The Carpenters, The Bobby Fuller Four, James McMurtry, The Lovin' Spoonful and The Easybeats). The two bonus tracks are a live recording of The Everly Brothers' song, "Man with Money", with frequent Crenshaw touring partners, The Bottle Rockets, just days after Phil Everly's passing, and an early '90s demo of a never before released Crenshaw song, "Front Page News".

== Track listing ==
1. "Grab the Next Train" (Marshall Crenshaw, Dan Bern) – 3:32
2. "Move Now" (Crenshaw, Bern) – 4:02
3. "Red Wine" (Crenshaw, Bern, Jesse Ruben) – 4:25
4. "Driving and Dreaming" (Crenshaw, Bern) – 4:47
5. "Stranger and Stranger" (Crenshaw) – 4:26
6. "I Don't See You Laughing Now" (Crenshaw) – 5:20
7. "No Time" (Jeff Lynne) – 3:45"
8. "(They Long to Be) Close to You" (Burt Bacharach, Hal David) – 5:23
9. "Never To Be Forgotten" (Bobby Fuller, Randy Fuller) – 3:28
10. "Right Here Now" (James McMurtry) – 3:48
11. "Didn't Want To Have To Do It" (John Sebastian) – 2:58
12. "Made My Bed: Gonna Lie In It" (George Young) – 2:26
13. "Man with Money" (live with The Bottle Rockets) (Don & Phil Everly) – 3:00
14. "Front Page News" (demo) (Crenshaw, Leroy Preston) – 3:32
