= Mary Jean & 9 Others =

Studio album by Marshall Crenshaw
- Released: 1987
- Studio: Bearsville (Woodstock, New York)
- Genre: Rock
- Length: 42:15
- Label: Warner Bros.
- Producer: Don Dixon

Marshall Crenshaw chronology
Downtown (1985)	Mary Jean & 9 Others (1987)	Good Evening (1989)

Professional ratings
Review scores
Source	Rating
AllMusic	3/5 stars
Robert Christgau	B
The Encyclopedia of Popular Music	3/5 stars
The Rolling Stone Album Guide	3/5 stars

Mary Jean & 9 Others is the fourth album by singer-songwriter Marshall Crenshaw. The album was produced by Don Dixon and features a return to the sounds of Crenshaw's earlier work after the country rock excursion of his previous album, Downtown.

== Background ==
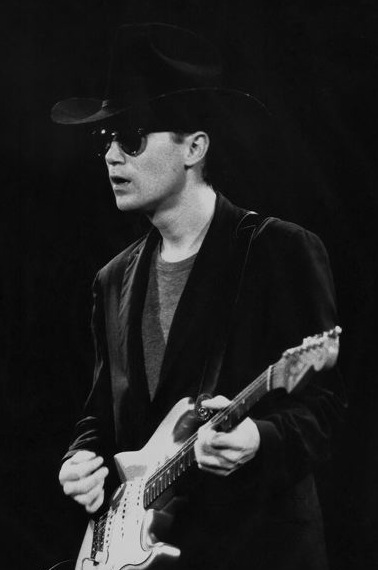
Crenshaw performing in 1987

Crenshaw noted that the album represented a more guitar-heavy sound when compared to its predecessor, 1985's Downtown. He explained, "I rediscovered the sound of turning my guitar amplifier all the way up. This was kind of a reactionary move after Downtown, which was a slick record with a clean, twangy guitar sound." In another interview, Crenshaw similarly framed the album as a return to the style of his first two albums after the experiment of Downtown, stating, "I did want to try and pick up where I'd left off with Field Day. My third album [Downtown] was a bit of a weird departure for me in that it wasn’t the work of a self-contained band like the first two. I set out to get back to that approach." As such, the album was largely recorded as a trio with Crenshaw, his brother Robert returning on drums, and the Joe Jackson Band's Graham Maby on bass.

Crenshaw and his band recorded Mary Jean & 9 Others after Crenshaw completed filming for his role as Buddy Holly in La Bamba. He recalled, "I took a train ride back from the West Coast and wrote a lot of the words on Amtrak stationery, looking out the train window at the passing landscape." As with Downtown, the album was recorded amidst worsening relations between Crenshaw and Warner Bros. Records, leading Crenshaw to recall the sessions as having "a cloud" over them. For the album's sound, Crenshaw drew on the Bobby Fuller Four's style.

Crenshaw recorded the album with producer Don Dixon at Bearsville Studios near Crenshaw's home. He explained, "On this one album, I tried hard to come in under budget; I wanted to be able to put something in the bank after we were done, and I think that did happen this one time. We did the whole record in four weeks, [then remixed it] at Ardent in Memphis. Dixon and I are still great friends; we stay in touch."

== Songs ==
The album's title is derived from the album's seventh song "Mary Jean". When asked who "Mary Jean" was, Crenshaw responded, "Nobody. And I was always disappointed I couldn't think of a more interesting title and concept for that song. Like I said, there was a cloud over me during [those] albums; I just had to grind it out sometimes, and that song was one of those times."

Crenshaw said of "A Hundred Dollars," the second track on the album, "It's really just a nice rock 'n' roll song. There’s this old one called, 'I've Got Five Dollars and It's Saturday Night,' so I figured, 'Hmm, $5 in 1954, you'd need $100 in 1987 to do the same thing you could do with $5 in the earlier song.' So maybe it's kind of an update of 'I've Got Five Dollars And It's Saturday Night.' Really, it's just a straightforward rock 'n' roll song. It's got some nice chords in it."

Opener "This Is Easy" would later appear as the title track on the compilation This Is Easy: The Best of Marshall Crenshaw, while "Calling Out for Love" was a collaboration with producer Don Dixon. "This Street" features a bassline that Crenshaw encouraged Maby to play like Sly and the Family Stone's Larry Graham did on "Everyday People". "Steel Strings", the album's sole cover, was chosen because T Bone Burnett was producing Peter Case's album at the same time as Crenshaw's Downtown.

== Track listing ==
All songs written by Marshall Crenshaw, except where noted.

1. "This Is Easy" – 3:51
2. "A Hundred Dollars" – 4:08
3. "Calling Out for Love (at Crying Time)" (Crenshaw, Don Dixon) – 4:37
4. "Wild Abandon" – 4:22
5. "This Street" – 4:39
6. "Somebody Crying" – 3:26
7. "Mary Jean" – 4:10
8. "Steel Strings" (Peter Case) – 5:08
9. "Til That Moment" – 3:52
10. "They Never Will Know" – 4:02

== Personnel ==
- Marshall Crenshaw - vocals, guitar, tambourine
- Robert Crenshaw – drums
- Graham Maby – bass

Guest Musicians

- Mitch Easter – guitar (track 8)
- Marti Jones – vocals (track 4)
- Don Dixon – vocals (tracks 3, 7 & 8)
- Gary Burke – percussion (track 2), 2nd drum kit (track 4)
- Chris Donato – vocals (tracks 1 & 4–6)
- Tom Teeley – vocals (tracks 1, 2, & 4–6), guitar solo (tracks 9 & 10)
