= Whenever You're on My Mind =

1983 song by American rock musician Marshall Crenshaw

Single by Marshall Crenshaw

from the album Field Day
- B-side: "Jungle Rock"
- Released: April 1983
- Recorded: Record Plant in NYC in February 1983
- Genre: Power pop; jangle pop
- Label: Warner Bros.
- Songwriters: Marshall Crenshaw, Bill Teeley
- Producer: Steve Lillywhite

Marshall Crenshaw singles chronology
"Cynical Girl" (1982)	"Whenever You're on My Mind" (1983)	"Our Town EP" (1983)

Music video
- "Whenever You're on My Mind" on YouTube

"Whenever You're on My Mind" is a 1983 song by American rock musician Marshall Crenshaw. The song was released on his 1983 album Field Day. The song, notable for its booming production, originally was written during the making of Crenshaw's debut album but was saved for his second album release. Crenshaw felt the song was his best to date, and the song was released as Field Day's first single.

Released in 1983, the single saw early success on college radio but underperformed commercially. Crenshaw later pointed to the commercial disappointment as a factor in the deterioration of his relationship with Warner Bros. Records. Despite this, it has become one of Crenshaw's more famous songs and has seen critical acclaim. The song has been covered by multiple artists.

== Background ==
"Whenever You're on My Mind" was first written during the creation of Marshall Crenshaw's self-titled debut album, but Crenshaw decided to save the song for a later time. Crenshaw later said "I felt rushed doing Field Day but I was ready to take it on; I was ready to take up the challenge to do a second album. I had a couple songs leftover from my first album. I kept 'Whenever You're On My Mind' sort of in my back pocket for the future." A demo version of the song has been included on the Rhino reissue of Crenshaw's debut album.

Crenshaw co-wrote the song with Bill Teeley, the brother of his former Beatlemania co-star Tom Teeley. Crenshaw was a fan of Teeley's lyrics in the Teeley brothers' band the Metromen. Crenshaw gave Teeley the song title and asked him to channel "I Only Have Eyes for You" for the song's lyrics. Crenshaw later described Teeley's lyrical contributions as "absolutely beautiful." Musically, Crenshaw credited "When You Walk in the Room" by Jackie DeShannon as an influence.

Crenshaw credits the song's "big" drum sound to producer Steve Lillywhite. He recalled "Steve had a lot of input in that. There's that big fill in the middle of the last chorus of 'Whenever You're on My Mind,' and that was his idea. The drums are big."

Crenshaw later said of the song, "I thought 'Whenever You're On My Mind' was the best thing we'd done up to that point. It was, like, 'the bomb,' as they say."

== Release ==
"Whenever You're on My Mind" was released as the first single from the Field Day album, backed with "Jungle Rock." The song quickly became a successful college radio hit. However, the song failed to replicate the chart success of his previous hit "Someday, Someway," peaking at number 103 on the Billboard charts and number 23 on the Mainstream Rock chart. Crenshaw later stated that he thought the song would be a "huge hit," recalling that the song was a regional hit in Washington, DC, but the label "sat on their hands." He later reflected on the song's performance: "If that had been a hit, it would have been really big for me. But things went sour quickly. My relationship with Warner Brothers went in the crapper, which was disappointing."

The song, however, has become one of Crenshaw's more well-known songs. Crenshaw later said "My brother posted on Facebook the other day that 'Whenever You're on My Mind' was playing in a Wendy's in Dallas. I think that's really cool that some song I did 35 years ago can have a second life like that." Crenshaw continues to perform the song live.

== Reception ==
Since its release, "Whenever You're on My Mind" has seen critical acclaim. Trouser Press called the song a "joyous number" that "mine[s] Crenshaw's shuffle-pop resources effectively." Allmusic's Mark Deming described the song as a "beautiful little tune," while Steve Spears of The Tampa Bay Times wrote that he preferred it to Crenshaw's biggest hit, "Someday, Someway." Seattle Weekly said the song was one of Crenshaw's "great slices of power pop," while Entertainment Weekly praised the song's "walls of hooky sound" and named it one of the songs on Crenshaw's first two albums that "sound as invigorating as ever." Writer Bruce Pollock named it as one of the 7500 Most Important Songs for the Rock and Roll Era, calling it "America's finest power pop of the '80s."

Crenshaw himself has spoken positively of the song, stating, "I always wanted to make a 45 that exploded out of the speakers and grabbed your emotions in the manner of 'When You Walk in the Room' by Jackie DeShannon or 'Be My Baby' by the Ronettes. 'Whenever You're on My Mind' nails it for me. The guitars on the intro sound like ... church bells."

== Charts ==
Chart (1983)	Peak position
US (Billboard Bubbling Under Hot 100)	3

== Cover versions ==
"Whenever You're on My Mind" has been covered by Ronnie Spector and Marti Jones.

An Environmental Muzak cover of the song was created by Clair Marlo.
