= Big Town Playboys =

The Big Town Playboys are a six-piece acoustic British rhythm and blues revival group. Founded by Ricky Cool and Andy Silvester in 1984, and known as Ricky Cool and the Big Town Playboys, they covered American music from the 1940s and 1950s, such as that of Amos Milburn and Little Walter.

The Big Town Playboys have released a series of studio albums, as well as a collaborative project with Jeff Beck (entitled Crazy Legs), re-creating the songs of Gene Vincent. Several of their songs also appeared on the soundtrack of the film, The Pope Must Die. They have performed as a backing band for Robert Plant, who contributed guest vocals on their album Roll the Dice. They also performed together at the Birmingham Heart Beat 86 charity concert. Eric Clapton has expressed admiration for their work, arranging for them to open for him during his two-week-long stint at the Royal Albert Hall in London in 1996.

Mike Sanchez left the band at the end of 1999 to pursue a solo career. Presently, Ian Jennings is the only remaining original member of the band. After Sanchez's departure, the Big Town Playboys were fronted by another local London artist, Big Joe Louis, of "Big Joe Louis and his Blues Kings."

In May 2005, the band teamed up with Gary Brooker and Andy Fairweather Low to give a charity concert called "Aftershock" in India, with all proceeds to benefit victims of the tsunami caused by the 2004 Indian Ocean earthquake.

== Discography ==
- Playboy Boogie (1985 – Making Waves)
- Now Appearing (1990 – Blue Horizon)
- Crazy Legs with Jeff Beck (1993 – Epic)
- Hip Joint (1994 – Blue Horizon)
- Off the Clock...Live! (1997 – Eagle)
- Six Pack (1998 – BTP)
- Western World (2001 – Indigo)
- Now Appearing (2002 – Blue Horizon)
- Roll the Dice (2004 – Mi5)
