= 447 (album) =

#447

Studio album by Marshall Crenshaw
- Released: 1999
- Genre: Rock
- Length: 39:45
- Label: Razor & Tie
- Producer: Biff Jerome Productions

Marshall Crenshaw chronology
The 9 Volt Years (1998)	#447 (1999)	This Is Easy: The Best of Marshall Crenshaw (2000)

Professional ratings
Review scores
Source	Rating
AllMusic	4/5 stars
Robert Christgau	A−

#447 is the eighth studio album by rock artist Marshall Crenshaw. It was released in 1999 on Razor & Tie. It was re-released in 2021 on Shinytone, in both vinyl and CD formats. There are two bonus tracks on the re-released CD.

== Track listing ==
All songs written by Marshall Crenshaw, except where noted.

1. "Opening" – 0:49
2. "Dime a Dozen Guy" (Crenshaw, David Cantor) – 4:05
3. "Television Light" – 4:44
4. "Glad Goodbye" – 4:05
5. "West of Bald Knob" – 3:26
6. "Tell Me All About It" (Crenshaw, Richard Julian) – 3:41
7. "Ready Right Now" (Crenshaw, Bill Lloyd) – 4:49
8. "Eydie's Tune" – 3:18
9. "T.M.D." (Crenshaw, Bill Demaine) – 3:24
10. "Right There in Front of Me" – 4:06
11. "You Said What??" – 3:18

== Personnel ==
- Marshall Crenshaw - vocals, guitar, bass, drums, drum machines, percussion, Mellotron, celeste
- Brad Jones – bass, chamberlain, electric piano, organ
- David Hofstra – bass
- David Sancious – electric piano
- Greg Leisz – dobro, lap steel
- Bill Lloyd – guitar, mandolin
- Andy York – guitar
- Pat Buchanan – guitar, power steel
- Chris Carmichael – viola, violin, fiddle
- Valentina Evans – viola
- Footch Fischetti – fiddle
- Rachel Handman – violin
- Paul Shapiro – tenor sax
