= Frankie's House (soundtrack) =

Soundtrack album by Jeff Beck/Jed Leiber
- Released: 23 November 1992
- Studio: Comfort's Place (Sevenoaks, East Sussex)
- Genre: Instrumental rock
- Label: Epic Soundtrax
- Producer: Jeff Beck, Jed Leiber, Leif Mases

Jeff Beck chronology
Beckology (1991)	Frankie's House (1992)	Crazy Legs (1993)

Professional ratings
Review scores
Source	Rating
Allmusic	2/5 stars

Frankie's House is a 1992 instrumental album by Jeff Beck and Jed Leiber. The music was written for the soundtrack of an Australian TV mini-series of the same name about photojournalism during the Vietnam War.

== Track listing ==
All tracks composed by Jeff Beck and Jed Leiber; except where indicated

1. "The Jungle"
2. "Requiem for the Bao-Chi"
3. "Hi-Heel Sneakers" (Robert Higginbotham)
4. "Thailand"
5. "Love and Death"
6. "Cathouse"
7. "In the Dark"
8. "Sniper Patrol"
9. "Peace Island"
10. "White Mice"
11. "Tunnel Rat"
12. "Vihn's Funeral"
13. "Apocalypse"
14. "Innocent Victim"
15. "Jungle Reprise"

Original score produced by Jeff Beck and Jed Leiber

Recorded at Comfort's Place, Sevenoaks, East Sussex. UK. Album co-produced by Leif Mases... Keys Programming and Studio Tech - Dave Saunders
