= There She Goes Again (Marshall Crenshaw song) =

Single by Marshall Crenshaw

from the album Marshall Crenshaw
- B-side: "The Usual Thing"
- Released: September 1982
- Recorded: January 1982
- Genre: Power pop; new wave
- Label: Warner Bros.
- Songwriter(s): Marshall Crenshaw
- Producer(s): Richard Gottehrer, Marshall Crenshaw

Marshall Crenshaw singles chronology
"Someday, Someway" (1982)	"There She Goes Again" (1982)	"Cynical Girl" (1983)

Audio
- "There She Goes Again" on YouTube

"There She Goes Again" is a 1982 song by American rock musician Marshall Crenshaw. The song was released on his 1982 debut album, Marshall Crenshaw. Lyrically, the song was written about seeing a girl from one's window as she passes by in a car, an image that Crenshaw later said was inspired by his youth.

"There She Goes Again" was released as the album's second single in the US. It has since become one of Crenshaw's most famous songs. It has since seen positive critical reception and has become a live favorite, often in a slower style.

== Background ==
According to Crenshaw, "There She Goes Again" was inspired by memories of his youth, which he characterized as a time when "everything took place in cars." Described by Crenshaw as "a pretty typical subject for a rock and roll song," the song lyrically focuses on seeing a girl pass by through a window. He explained,

I thought of this one window in somebody's house, and once in a while a car would go by with a girl in it, and it's, like, 'Oh, there she goes again.' You know, there's always a lot of drama going on in your life when you're a kid, and you have some mobility, getting out in the world.

Crenshaw praised bassist Chris Donato's performance on the song, saying, "He plays really well. I liked it ... he did a nice job on that one."

== Release and reception ==
In the United States, "There She Goes Again" was released as the second single from Crenshaw's debut album in September 1982. The B-side of the American single was "The Usual Thing," another song from the Marshall Crenshaw album. The single reached number 10 on the Billboard Bubbling Under charts in the US, becoming a radio hit on college circuits. The song has also appeared on the compilation album This Is Easy: The Best of Marshall Crenshaw.

Since its release, "There She Goes Again" has seen critical acclaim. Brett Anderson of The Washington Post said the song "is a typical love song for the young songwriter, joyous-sounding and even-keeled in spite of the longing that inspired it." Entertainment Weekly praised the song's "skiffle step" and named it one of the songs on Crenshaw's first two albums that "sound as invigorating as ever." Mike Long of The Denver Post called it one "the killers from his self-titled debut," while Roger Catlin of The Hartford Courant named it as a "great song." The Rockaway Times named it as one of his "standout tracks."

== Live history ==
In live performances, Crenshaw often performs the song in a slower style. He explained, "I cut the time in half, like I'm doing with a bunch of songs — not to slow it down, but to reinterpret it from a groove standpoint." Crenshaw said of the song, "I still really dig playing [it]." Live versions of the song have appeared on the live albums Live …My Truck Is My Home and I've Suffered for My Art...Now It's Your Turn. A live version of the track performed with the Bottle Rockets in Chicago has been released on the I Don't See You Laughing Now EP. Crenshaw used a Stratocaster on this live version for its "glassy, ringing sound."

== Charts ==
Chart (1982)	Peak position
US (Billboard Bubbling Under Hot 100)	10
