= Miracle of Science =

Studio album by Marshall Crenshaw
- Released: July 23, 1996
- Studio: Alex the Great, Nashville, Tennessee
- Genre: Rock
- Length: 43:18
- Label: Razor & Tie
- Producer: Marshall Crenshaw

Marshall Crenshaw chronology
Live …My Truck Is My Home (1994)	Miracle of Science (1996)	The 9 Volt Years (1998)

Professional ratings
Review scores
Source	Rating
AllMusic	3/5 stars
Chicago Sun-Times	3.5/4 stars
musicHound ROCK	4/5 stars
Rolling Stone	3/5 stars
Robert Christgau	(3-star Honorable Mention)

Miracle of Science is the seventh studio album by singer/songwriter Marshall Crenshaw, released on July 23, 1996. It was his first studio effort for the indie imprint Razor & Tie. Having left the major labels to increase his creative control, Crenshaw produced the album and played most of the instruments.

Due to its status as Crenshaw's first indie album and first largely-self performed album, Miracle of Science has been singled by Crenshaw as a "case of circling back" to his pre-major label roots. He was largely spurred to record the album due to his faith in the song "What Do You Dream Of?": he explained, "I had 'What Do You Dream Of' as of 1992, a few years before the album. To some extent it was about needing to do an album in order to get that song out. You couldn't just do a single back then, at least I didn't think so."

Crenshaw also revived "Starless Summer Sky" for the album, having co-written the song as "Starlit Summer Sky" in 1979. He recalled, "That was the first song that I ever co-wrote, or wrote, that I thought was great. It got passed over when I did my first album." For its recording on Miracle of Science, he tweaked the song's title by changing "starlit" to "starless" to "give it a little bit of a dark atmosphere." The album also features a cover of Grant Hart's "Twenty-Five Forty-One". Crenshaw noted, "I reached out to Grant around that time, when my record of the song was coming out. We were friendly after that, and I'd see him every once in a while, mostly when I had a gig in the Twin Cities."

== Track listing ==
All songs written by Marshall Crenshaw, except where noted.

1. "soundbite" – 0:11
2. "What Do You Dream Of?" – 3:28
3. "Who Stole That Train" (Hy Heath) – 3:32
4. "Laughter" – 4:41
5. "Twenty-Five Forty-One" (Grant Hart) – 3:22
6. "Starless Summer Sky" (Crenshaw, Rick Cioffi, Fred Todd) – 3:11
7. "Only an Hour Ago" – 4:07
8. "Wondrous Place" (Bill Giant, Jeff Lewis) – 2:42
9. "The 'In' Crowd" (Billy Page) – 3:36
10. "Theme from 'Flaregun'" – 4:47
11. "Seven Miles an Hour" – 4:28
12. "There and Back Again" (Crenshaw, Glen Burtnik) – 5:13

=== 2020 Revision ===
In 2020, the album was re-released on Crenshaw's own label with a new running order, some remixing, and 2 newly recorded songs.

1. "(Soundbite)" – 0:11
2. "What Do You Dream Of?" – 3:28
3. "Who Stole That Train" – 3:48
4. "Only an Hour Ago" – 4:20
5. "Theme from 'Flaregun'" – 4:51
6. "Laughter" – 4:41
7. "A Wondrous Place" – 2:42
8. "Twenty-Five Forty-One" – 3:22
9. "Starless Summer Sky" – 3:11
10. "The 'In' Crowd" – 3:36
11. "There and Back Again" – 5:13
12. "Rouh Na Selim Neves"* – 4:28 ["Seven Miles an Hour" recording played backwards]
13. "Seven Miles an Hour" – 4:30
14. "What the Hell I Got"* (Michel Pagliaro) – 3:38
15. "Misty Dreamer"* (Daniel Wylie) – 3:00

[*] - newly added for the reissue.

== Personnel ==
- Marshall Crenshaw - vocals, guitar, bass, drums, keyboards, percussion, tambourine, vibraphone
- Brad Jones – bass, harmony vocals
- Andy York – guitar, backing vocals
- Jay Sdad – acoustic, electric and slide guitar, lap steel
- Bill Lloyd – acoustic and electric guitar, mandolin
- Les James Lester – drums, bongos
- Greg Leisz – dobro
- Byron House – bass
- Fenner Kastner – drums
- Kenny Margolis – piano
- Chris Carmichael – violin, cello
- Crispin Cioe – saxophone
- Larry Etkin – trumpet
