= Lotta Lovin' =

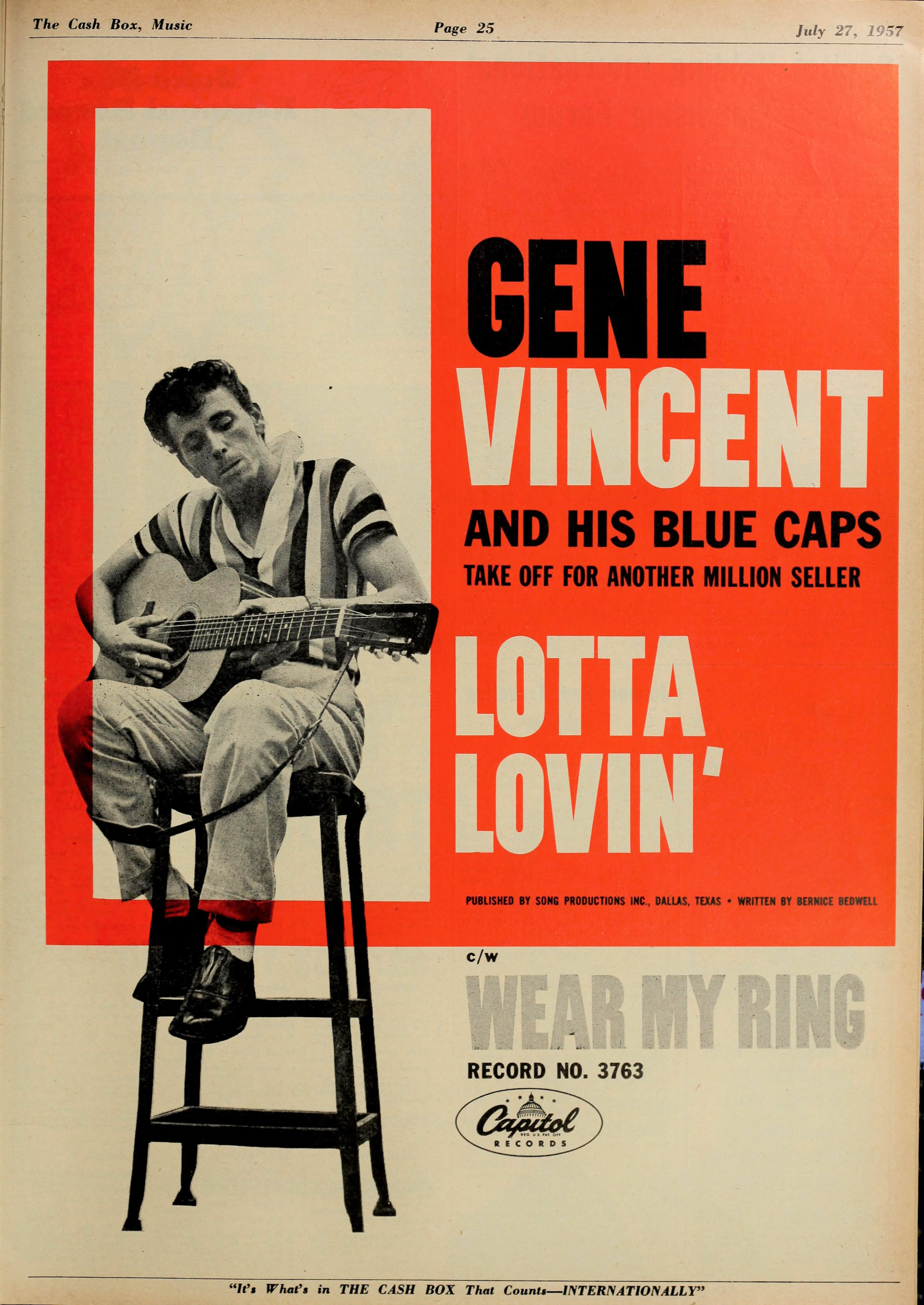
- Cash box advertisement

Single by Gene Vincent and The Blue Caps
- B-side: "Wear My Ring"
- Released: July 1957
- Studio: Capitol (Los Angeles, California)
- Genre: Rockabilly
- Length: 2:07
- Label: Capitol
- Songwriter(s): Bernice Bedwell
- Producer(s): Ken Nelson

Gene Vincent and The Blue Caps singles chronology
"B-I-Bickey-Bi, Bo-Bo-Go" (1957)	"Lotta Lovin'" (1957)	"Dance to the Bop" (1957)

"Lotta Lovin'" is a song by American rockabilly singer Gene Vincent and The Blue Caps.

== Background ==
The song was recorded at Capitol Studios in Los Angeles and released as a 45 single with "Wear My Ring", co-written by Bobby Darin as the B side. Gene Vincent performed the songs on his first appearance on the TV show American Bandstand, hosted by Dick Clark.

The lead guitarist on the track was Johnny Meeks, who had replaced Cliff Gallup.

The song was produced by Ken Nelson. Bernice Bedwell wrote the song, who played the song over the telephone to Vincent. He also recorded "In My Dreams" and "Lonesome Boy" by Bedwell.

== Reception ==
It reached #7 on the U.S. R&B chart and #13 on the U.S. pop chart in 1957. In Canada, the song reached #2 on the CHUM Charts.

== Other versions ==
- Mickey Gilley, as a single in 1965, but it did not chart.
- Don McLean, on his 1978 album Chain Lightning.
- Jeff Beck and Big Town Playboys, on their 1993 album Crazy Legs.
- Ray Campi in 1996
- Danny Gatton in a recording released in 1998
