= Life's Too Short (album) =

Studio album by Marshall Crenshaw
- Released: May 14, 1991
- Genre: Arena rock
- Length: 45:34
- Label: MCA
- Producer: Ed Stasium

Marshall Crenshaw chronology
Good Evening (1989)	Life's Too Short (1991)	Live …My Truck Is My Home (1994)

Singles from Life's Too Short
- 1. "Better Back Off" Released: 1991

Professional ratings
Review scores
Source	Rating
AllMusic	4/5 stars
musicHound ROCK	4/5 stars
Rolling Stone	3/5 stars
Robert Christgau	B+
The Encyclopedia of Popular Music	3/5 stars
The Rolling Stone Album Guide	3/5 stars

Life's Too Short is the sixth album by singer/songwriter Marshall Crenshaw.

The album was produced by Ed Stasium and featured Kenny Aronoff on drums. Crenshaw recalled, "I liked what Kenny Aronoff (drums) and Ed Stasium (production) were doing right then, I liked them both personally, and I wanted to work with them, so off we went…"

"Better Back Off" was a moderate hit on the Modern Rock charts, reaching number 17. Crenshaw said of the song, "On 'Better Back Off' you can tell from the music that I'm trying to write a big Rock-radio anthem. But the lyrics don't quite get there – they describe an intimate conversation between two people, not very anthem-like..."

Spin named the album to their list of 30 overlooked albums from 1991, stating, "The Ed Stasium-produced album is full of the kind of literate guitar pop that made Crenshaw a star in the '80s, with catchy gems like 'Delilah' and “Fantastic Planet of Love.'"

== Track listing ==
All songs written by Marshall Crenshaw, except where noted.

1. "Better Back Off" (Crenshaw, Tom Teeley) – 4:48
2. "Don't Disappear Now" (Crenshaw, Teeley) – 4:11
3. "Fantastic Planet Of Love" – 5:20
4. "Delilah" (Crenshaw, Leroy Preston) – 4:08
5. "Face Of Fashion" (Chris Knox) – 3:57
6. "Stop Doing That" – 4:09
7. "Walkin' Around" – 4:14
8. "Starting Tomorrow" – 4:17
9. "Everything's The Truth" (Crenshaw, Jules Shear) – 3:58
10. "Somewhere Down The Line" – 6:32

== Personnel ==
- Marshall Crenshaw - vocals, guitar, piano, bass, percussion
- Kenny Aronoff – drums
- Fernando Saunders – bass
- Ed Stasium – keyboards, percussion, guitar, vocals
- Greg Leisz – slide guitar, frying pan guitar
- Peter Case – harmonica
- Paul Shaffer – piano, organ
- Tommy Price – drums
- Tony Garnier – bass
- Rosie Flores – vocals
- Steven Soles – vocals
