= Field Day (Marshall Crenshaw album) =

Studio album by Marshall Crenshaw
- Released: June 1983; October 25, 2005 (Reissue)
- Recorded: February 1983
- Studio: Record Plant (New York City)
- Genre: Rock
- Length: 36:25
- Labels: Warner Bros. Wounded Bird (Reissue)
- Producer: Steve Lillywhite

Marshall Crenshaw chronology
Marshall Crenshaw (1982)	Field Day (1983)	Downtown (1985)

Field Day is the second album by American rock musician Marshall Crenshaw. Recorded quickly after the moderate success of his self-titled debut album, Field Day featured a change in style and production after Crenshaw switched producers from Richard Gottehrer to Steve Lillywhite. The recording of the album was remembered positively by Crenshaw as was the album's sound.

Despite the success of its predecessor, Field Day was a commercial disappointment, reaching number 52 in the United States while its lead single, "Whenever You're on My Mind" reached number 103 on the singles chart. There was some criticism geared toward the album's production. Despite this, Crenshaw remains supportive of the album and "Whenever You're on My Mind" has become one of Crenshaw's most famous songs.

== Background ==
Field Day was recorded shortly after Crenshaw's self-titled debut album. Crenshaw recalled being rushed to release a follow-up to his moderately successful debut despite a lack of material; he explained, "I felt rushed doing Field Day but I was ready to take it on; I was ready to take up the challenge to do a second album. I had a couple songs leftover from my first album. I kept 'Whenever You're on My Mind' sort of in my back pocket for the future and I had 'For Her Love' that was unrecorded and laying around as a spare part. But the rest I wrote for the album."

Crenshaw selected British producer Steve Lillywhite to produce Field Day rather than Richard Gottehrer, the producer for his debut album; "What Time Is It?," a song co-written by Gottehrer, was included on the album as a gesture of good will. Crenshaw explained his choice of Lillywhite in an interview, saying, "I was the one who brought Steve Lillywhite into the whole thing. People in Burbank at Warner Brothers never heard of him. My A&R person at Warner Brothers in New York was really savvy and a really brilliant gal. Her name was Karin Berg. She knew who Steve Lillywhite was. It was kind of a chaotic scene but out of all this chaos was a record that's a keeper."

== Recording ==
Crenshaw recalled the sessions for Field Day as very positive and loose. He recalled, "We had a really great crew on that record. It was Steve [Lillywhite] and Scott Litt and Garry Rindfuss. All we did every day was just have fun. We were all really happy with the end result."

Field Day featured a bigger production than Crenshaw's debut, most notably with the drum sound. Crenshaw was pleased with this shift in direction, stating, "The thing is the tracks are really powerful and explosive, but there's never more than one guitar on it. There are some overdubs, but the rhythm tracks are all just guitar, bass, and drums. That made me really happy."

=== Songs ===
Field Day features "Whenever You're on My Mind" one of Crenshaw's most famous songs. The track was one that Crenshaw had felt confident about, calling it "the bomb" in an interview. Field Day also features "Our Town", a song which Crenshaw explained was about "being homesick" for his then-hometown, New York City.

Crenshaw later said that "Monday Morning Rock" was "about this sorta fast-paced life that I lived for a short time. I'm sure you've had the experience, where you walk out of the club and find out that it's the next day, that the sun is out, and you didn't know."

== Artwork ==
The album cover of Field Day features Crenshaw in front of the high school he attended, Berkley High School in Berkley, Michigan. Crenshaw has expressed his dislike of the cover in multiple interviews, claiming it had been chosen while he was on a vacation with family. In one interview, he explained:

I was on my vacation with my wife, Ione, and my brother, Robert after we finished the second album. ... When I got back my first manager had this artwork and said, 'Well here it is, here's the cover for the new album' and I just looked at it and went, 'Are you crazy?!' He found the worst photo from a photo session and put it right on the front cover. I said, 'Look, I hate this!' And he said, 'Well, here’s the thing, if we change it, it will delay the release of the album by two weeks.' And I was like, 'Oh well, we don't wanna do that.' He said, 'Yeah, you've got your touring schedule and the label's ready to go.' I look back on it now and I think 'two fucking weeks was all it would have mattered!'

The cover art was changed for the 35th anniversary reissue of the album, with the new cover receiving Crenshaw's approval. The new cover was taken from the 7" single art for "Whenever You're On My Mind".

== Release and reception ==
Professional ratings
Review scores
Source	Rating
AllMusic	4/5 stars
Robert Christgau	A+
The Encyclopedia of Popular Music	3/5 stars
MusicHound Rock	4/5 stars
Rolling Stone	3/5 stars
Sounds	3.5/5 stars
Spin Alternative Record Guide	8/10

Field Day was a commercial disappointment after Crenshaw's debut, peaking at no. 52 in Billboard, lasting 14 weeks on the chart. The debut single from the album, "Whenever You're on My Mind", was aided by a popular early MTV music video and reached number 103 on the charts as well as number 23 on Billboard's Rock Tracks Chart; Crenshaw later expressed great disappointment that the single did not hit, saying "If that had been a hit, it would have been really big for me. But things went sour quickly." Crenshaw attempted to leave Warner Bros. after the album's performance, but the label would not allow it.

Field Day saw some positive reception from critics, particularly from Robert Christgau, who awarded it an A+ rating. However, many writers were critical of the album's production. Crenshaw later defended the production, explaining in a later interview, "I had lunch with Steve about a year and a half ago. Hadn't seen him in a long time. I'd read some interviews with him over the years where he was very contrite about the whole thing. He'd say, 'I feel like I really steered Marshall down the wrong path,' and all this stuff. I finally got sick of it. I said, 'I'm going to track his ass down, and we're going to talk about it.' [Laughs.] All in a very good-natured way, because I like him a whole lot. I told him, 'Steve, I want to remind you that there wasn't a single thing about that record that didn't meet my approval. If there was anything I didn't like about it, it would’ve gotten changed.' I had a really supportive A&R person back then, and I absolutely had my eyes open. Always."

Crenshaw remains supportive of the album and considers it one of his best. He said, "I'd have to say that the music on Field Day is still very vibrant and full of life. It's the sound of young people who are in love with life and just having a great time." In another interview, he stated, "I really loved Field Day, even though it was a dumb idea to do a second album in such a hurry after the first one. I remember listening to the playback and feeling as good as I've ever felt about one of my records."

== Track listing ==
All songs written by Marshall Crenshaw, except where noted.

1. "Whenever You're on My Mind" (Crenshaw, Bill Teeley) - 3:19
2. "Our Town" - 4:13
3. "One More Reason" - 3:36
4. "Try" - 3:10
5. "One Day with You" - 5:01
6. "For Her Love" - 3:02
7. "Monday Morning Rock" (Crenshaw, David Weiss) - 3:34
8. "All I Know Right Now" - 3:52
9. "What Time Is It?" (Bob Feldman, Richard Gottehrer, Jerry Goldstein) - 2:53
10. "Hold It" - 3:45

=== Track listing for the UK EP U.S. Remix ===
Side one

1. "Our Town"
2. "For Her Love"
3. "Monday Morning Rock"
4. "Little Sister" (Live)

Side two

1. "For Her Love" (Extended Mix)

"Our Town," "For Her Love" and Monday Morning Rock" were mixed and edited by John Luongo and engineered by Jay Mark and Michael Hutchinson.

"Little Sister" was originally recorded for The King Biscuit Flower Power Hour by D.I.R. Broadcasting from a live performance at Ripley's Music Hall on December 2, 1983. It was mixed by Marshal Crenshaw and Jim Ball.

Mastering was by Greg Calbi and Ted Jensen at Sterling Sound N.Y.C.

== Personnel ==
- Marshall Crenshaw – lead guitar, vocals
- Chris Donato – bass guitar
- Robert Crenshaw – drums
- Mike Osborn – percussion
- Tom Teely – background vocals
- Bob Miller – background vocals
- John Crenshaw – background vocals

Produced by Steve Lillywhite. Engineers: Scott Litt, Garry Rindfuss
