= Frankie's House (TV series) =

- Based on: Page After Page by Tim Page
- Written by: Andy Armitage; Sue Masters; Matt Ford
- Directed by: Peter Fisk
- Starring: Iain Glen; Kevin Dillon
- Countries of origin: United Kingdom; Australia
- Original language: English

Production
- Producers: Matt Carroll; Eric Fellner
- Running time: 200 minutes (series); 108 minutes (film)
- Production companies: Anglia Television Films & Drama; Australia Broadcasting Corporation

Original release
- Network: ITV
- Release: May 9 – May 30, 1992

Frankie's House is a 1992 British-Australian TV drama based on the biography of British photographer Tim Page, especially focusing on his relationship with Sean Flynn (the son of Errol Flynn) during the Vietnam War.

It was first screened on the ITV network in the United Kingdom as four 50 minute episodes between 9 and 30 May 1992.

== Cast ==
- Iain Glen as Tim Page
- Kevin Dillon as Sean Flynn
- Stephen Dillane as Antony Strickland
- Alan David Lee as Martin Stuart-Fox
- Ally Fowler as Kate
- Betty Bobbitt as Surgeon
- Steven Vidler as Steve Cotler

== Soundtrack ==
The music for the series was composed and performed by Jeff Beck and Jed Leiber.
