= Downtown (Marshall Crenshaw album) =

Studio album by Marshall Crenshaw
- Released: 1985
- Genre: Roots rock
- Length: 37:12
- Label: Warner Bros.
- Producer: T-Bone Burnett, Marshall Crenshaw, Larry Hirsch

Marshall Crenshaw chronology
Field Day (1983)	Downtown (1985)	Mary Jean & 9 Others (1987)

Downtown is the third album by singer/songwriter Marshall Crenshaw. Recorded after the relative failure of his album Field Day, Downtown was a departure from his previous albums due to its more rootsy sound.

The album received moderately positive reviews, though less positive than his previous work, and was commercially unsuccessful, peaking at number 113.

== Background ==
After the relative disappointment of Field Day, Crenshaw had unsuccessfully attempted to leave Warner Bros. Records. Because of the conditions under which the album was recorded, Crenshaw felt that the songs on the album had a "downcast vibe" to them. He recalled, "That was in a period where I was really having trouble finishing things, and even committing to finishing things. My brain was really pretty scrambled at that point in time. That was after Field Day, and the whole fallout with that, where there was a real sense of doom about my career. It was really weird. If somebody had been able to whisper in my ear back then and tell me that everything was going to be reasonably okay… I wish somebody would've been able to do that. I was really worried."

Crenshaw decided to embark on a stylistic change from his previous albums, aiming for a more rootsy sound. This is seen in his choice of producer, T-Bone Burnett; Crenshaw explained, "That [change in style] was genuine because I was really obsessed with that kind of music. [Producer] T Bone Burnett is a brilliant guy. He was very focused, very serious. He was one of those people I crossed paths with back then who was super driven, super ambitious, someone who wasn't going to be denied or thwarted."

== Release and reception ==
Professional ratings
Review scores
Source	Rating
AllMusic	4/5 stars
Robert Christgau	A−
The Encyclopedia of Popular Music	3/5 stars
The Rolling Stone Album Guide	3/5 stars

Downtown was released in 1985 and featured three singles, "Little Wild One (No. 5)", "Blues Is King", and "The Distance Between". "Blues Is King" was inspired by the B.B. King album Blues Is King; Crenshaw was mixed on the song, saying, "I was never 100 percent happy with the lyrics, but I always thought the music was really beautiful, and that the track was nice, too. I don't play that one much. I haven't played it probably since the record was out."

Downtown was commercially less successful than its predecessors, hitting number 113 while its singles failed to chart. The album has received positive reception, with Robert Christgau calling it "well-crafted" and "fully imagined," though both Christgau and AllMusic rated Crenshaw's previous work higher.

Trouser Press would later hail it as "easily the finest, most mature of [Crenshaw's] first three albums" filled with "extraordinarily memorable and intelligent pop songs in a number of musical veins."

== Track listing ==
All songs written by Marshall Crenshaw, except where noted.

1. "Little Wild One (No. 5)" – 3:55
2. "Yvonne" – 3:53
3. "Blues Is King" – 3:49
4. "Terrifying Love" – 4:05
5. "Like a Vague Memory" – 4:07
6. "The Distance Between" – 3:42
7. "(We're Gonna) Shake Up Their Minds" – 3:34
8. "I'm Sorry (But So Is Brenda Lee)" (Ben Vaughn) – 3:21
9. "Right Now" (Sylvester Bradford, Al Lewis) – 2:38
10. "Lesson Number One" – 4:08

"Blues is King" was produced by Mitch Easter and Marshall Crenshaw.

== Personnel ==
- Marshall Crenshaw - guitars, vocals, bass, percussion
- Mickey Curry – drums
- Mitchell Froom – keyboards
- David Miner – bass, cannon plug
- Tony Levin – bass
- Jerry Marotta – drums, percussion, bongos
- T-Bone Burnett – electric sitar, Linn program, vocals
- Robert Crenshaw – drums
- G. E. Smith – guitar
- Mitch Easter – piano
- Tom Ardolino – drums
- Joey Spampinato – bass
- Tony Garnier – bass
- Faye Hunter – bass
- Steve Fischel – steel guitar
- Warren Klein – tamboura
- Genny Schorr Wardrobe Stylist
