= You're My Favorite Waste of Time =

1982 single by Marshall Crenshaw

Single by Marshall Crenshaw
- A-side: "Someday, Someway"
- Released: May 1982
- Recorded: Crenshaw's home, Pelham, New York
- Genre: Rock; new wave
- Label: Warner Bros.
- Songwriter: Marshall Crenshaw

Marshall Crenshaw singles chronology
"Something's Gonna Happen" (1981)	"You're My Favorite Waste of Time" (1982)	"There She Goes Again" (1982)

Audio
- "You're My Favorite Waste of Time" on YouTube

"You're My Favorite Waste of Time" (also known as "Favorite Waste of Time" and "My Favourite Waste of Time") is a song written and first released by American singer Marshall Crenshaw. His 1979 home demo of the song was released as the B-side of his 1982 hit "Someday, Someway" and is available on his compilations The 9 Volt Years and This Is Easy: The Best of Marshall Crenshaw.

Written by Crenshaw while in Beatlemania, the song was inspired by the Hollies and featured tongue-in-cheek lyrics about his wife. The song, though originally a B-side, would later be covered by many artists, including Bette Midler, who had a minor hit with the song in Australia and the US in 1983, and Owen Paul, who reached number 3 in Britain with his rendition.

== Original version ==
"You're My Favorite Waste of Time" was one of the first songs Marshall Crenshaw wrote, preceding his 1982 hit, "Someday, Someway". Crenshaw explained, "That's one that I actually remember writing. I was still in Beatlemania at the time. The show was at the Stanley Theater in Pittsburgh, and we were going to be there for two weeks. I got there a day early and was hanging out, watching the guys build sets. I went down to the room where all the guitars were, and I grabbed one of those Gibson J-160s. The Beatles, in the early days, used J-160 acoustics with P-90 pickups, so we had a couple of those in the show. I was noodling around, and I made that song up in my head as I was wandering around the theater. I got the title, and I was thinking a song that The Hollies might do, with a big anthemic chorus and harmonies and stuff."

The lyrics were intended by Crenshaw to be humorous. He explained, "The lyrics are tongue-in-cheek. 'You're my favorite waste of time.' It’s a love song. I don’t know what I was thinking of. I guess I was partly thinking about when I used to go over to [my wife] Ione’s house—this was when we were still in our teens—and we’d wait for her parents to go to bed so we could be alone. While we would do that, we were just sitting around watching TV, killing time. I really liked doing that with her, just sort of doing nothing. You could take it a lot of different ways, though. It’s a funny song, and it’s got funny words. Like, 'I don’t care if being with you is meaningless and ridiculous.' That’s a funny thing to say.'

Crenshaw recorded "You're My Favorite Waste of Time" in a homemade sound laboratory in his apartment in Pelham, New York. Crenshaw recorded the song alone, including the percussion, which was a combination of maracas, tambourine and two tracks of a single snare drum: he explained, "For a bass drum I muffled a parade snare drum with my hand and hit it just right, then I used the same drum as the snare drum." The song was credited to "Marshall Crenshaw and the Handsome, Ruthless and Stupid Band".

The song was originally released as the B-side to Crenshaw's hit "Someday, Someway." It would later appear on compilation albums and would be covered by numerous artists. Reflecting on the song's popularity among other artists Crenshaw later stated that the song "has really had staying power."

== Bette Midler version ==
"Favorite Waste of Time"

Single by Bette Midler

from the album No Frills
- B-side: "My Eye on You"
- Released: 1983
- Genre: Pop
- Length: 2:43
- Label: Atlantic
- Producers: Chuck Plotkin; Brock Walsh; Danny Goldberg

Bette Midler singles chronology
"All I Need to Know" (1983)	"Favorite Waste of Time" (1983)	"Beast of Burden" (1984)

Music video
- "Favorite Waste of Time" on YouTube

In 1983, American actress and singer Bette Midler covered the song for her sixth studio album No Frills, which also included covers of "Don't Know Much" (under the title "All I Need to Know" and with changed lyrics), and "Beast of Burden". Midler's version reached number 44 on the Kent Music Report and number 78 on the Billboard Hot 100. The song also appears on her 2015 compilation album A Gift of Love. Crenshaw said of Midler's version, "I guess there must have been something in it that struck her as funny—that appealed to her sense of humor perhaps, whatever that is."

Midler's version includes a brief third verse (starting with "one last thing") that Crenshaw did not write; Midler or an associate presumably wrote it, uncredited. Numerous cover versions of the song (including Owen Paul's, below) include this third verse.

== Owen Paul version ==
"My Favourite Waste of Time"

Single by Owen Paul

from the album As It Is
- Released: May 19, 1986
- Genre: Pop rock, new wave, jangle pop
- Label: Epic
- Producers: Owen Paul; Parry James; Mark Dearnley

Owen Paul singles chronology
"My Favourite Waste of Time" (1986)	"Pleased to Meet You" (1986)

Music video
- "My Favourite Waste of Time" on YouTube

The song was recorded by Scottish singer Owen Paul and released in the United Kingdom on May 19, 1986. It remains his biggest hit single, reaching number 3 on the UK chart in July 1986 and at number 23 in Australia. Paul is usually considered as a "one-hit wonder" because of the song's popularity and the fact that it was his only UK chart single. This recording features future Thunder member Mark Luckhurst on bass. It was aborted on the television programme Pebble Mill at One when the band members just stood still instead of miming as they were unable to hear the backing track.

Referring to the Paul's version, Crenshaw said that "a guy in Britain picked up on [Bette Midler's] version of it and had his own smash hit, which still gets played on the radio all the time in Europe." Crenshaw was critical of Paul's version in an interview, saying "I can't listen to even twenty seconds of that record at all." Following its success, Paul re-recorded the song three times, first in 2016 to celebrate its 30th anniversary, second in 2020 as a lockdown session, and most recently in 2021 to celebrate its 35th anniversary. However, all of those versions failed to chart.

=== Charts ===
Chart (1986)	Peak position
Austria (Ö3 Austria Top 40)	20
Belgium (Ultratop 50 Flanders)	8
Germany (GfK)	21
Ireland (IRMA)	4
Netherlands (Single Top 100)	8
UK Singles (Official Charts)	3
