= Someday, Someway =

1982 single by Marshall Crenshaw

Single by Marshall Crenshaw

from the album Marshall Crenshaw
- B-side: "You're My Favorite Waste of Time"
- Released: May 1982
- Recorded: January 1982
- Genre: Power pop; rock and roll; rockabilly
- Label: Warner Bros.
- Songwriter: Marshall Crenshaw
- Producers: Richard Gottehrer, Marshall Crenshaw

Marshall Crenshaw singles chronology
"Something's Gonna Happen" (1981)	"Someday, Someway" (1982)	"There She Goes Again" (1982)

Audio
- "Someday, Someway" on YouTube

Music video
- "Someday. Someway" on YouTube

"Someday, Someway" is a song by American rock musician Marshall Crenshaw. The song was released on his 1982 self-titled debut album.

A breakthrough song for Crenshaw, "Someday, Someway" originated as a take on Gene Vincent's "Lotta Lovin'". Crenshaw wanted to use the beat to create a hypnotic effect and wrote a new melody around it. The lyrics were described by Crenshaw as simple, but with a hidden depth; he later claimed that the lyrics had been influenced by the beginnings of his marriage.

Crenshaw's version of the song was released as a single in 1982 after Robert Gordon released the first version of the song in 1981. Both versions saw early success on New York radio, though Crenshaw's rendition saw greater success nationally. Gordon's 1981 version reached number 76 on the Billboard chart, while Crenshaw's version ultimately hit the top 40 in the United States and has since become his most famous song. It has since been covered by multiple artists.

== Background and recording ==
"Someday, Someway" was one of the first songs Marshall Crenshaw wrote, following "You're My Favorite Waste of Time" and some others. The song was written while Crenshaw was in New York, where he had played John Lennon in the musical Beatlemania; he explained, "While I was [in New York], I wrote 'Someday, Someway' and five or six of the other tunes on my first album. I wrote those in my hotel room. That was my next move in life, to be a recording artist. I actually had a sense of artistic direction and off I went." Crenshaw described "Someday, Someway" as "the first [song] I wrote where I really thought 'Eureka'." Calling it a "breakthrough moment," he later said the song was the result of a "particular sound and style had been forming in my mind during this period."

"Someday, Someway" was recorded along with other songs for his debut album by Crenshaw with producer Richard Gottehrer at the Power Station in New York. Gotterher, a former songwriter whose hits included "I Want Candy" and "My Boyfriend's Back", had produced albums by Blondie and the Go-Go's during the 1970s and 1980s. Crenshaw had originally planned to produce his debut album alone but after sessions stalled, Warner Bros. suggested Gotterher; Crenshaw recalled, "We started making our first album and I sort of [BS'd] my way into the producer's chair but it didn't work out. So Richard Gottehrer came in and he helped me make the record."

== Music and lyrics ==
"Someday, Someway" was based on the 1957 Gene Vincent song "Lotta Lovin'." As Crenshaw explained, "I wanted to take the beat and atmosphere of a 1950s Rock and Roll record that I loved ... and build something around that. I came up with the music first for 'Someday' and dug that it was kind of hypnotic, very spare and succinct." Crenshaw later called the song's guitar riff his "my best riff ever."

Crenshaw wrote the lyrics to the song after finishing the music, explaining, "they were nice and spare but had some depth, lots of possible meanings and implications, etc. There was something kind of mysterious about it and I liked that." Crenshaw described the song as "one of those ones that came out in a rush." In an interview with PBS, Crenshaw explained that the song had subconsciously been written about the early stages of marriage. He stated, "What I figured out finally was that I wrote it about the awkward beginnings of a marriage. All of a sudden, you're married and you realized that you signed up for something permanent. That's what the song's about. At the time I didn't realize that. I wasn't trying to write about that, but that's just what was going on."

== Release ==
The first version of "Someday, Someway" to be released was in 1981 by neo-rockabilly musician Robert Gordon. This version of the song became a regional hit in New York. Crenshaw later attributed the song's success to the New York radio station 102.7 WNEW-FM. He explained in an interview, "WNEW was on one hand what you would call a mainstream FM rock station, but there also was some flexibility. People like Vin [Scelsa] and Meg Griffin were really talented and determined to express themselves as well as play the hits. Meg really loved Robert Gordon's version of 'Someday, Someway,' and just jumped on it. Then when I got my single out on Shake Records, what do you know? She picked up on that, too, and started talking about me on the radio. Then the rest of the station followed suit; they were really great to us, always."

Crenshaw's version of "Someday, Someway" came out in May 1982. He was initially hesitant to release it as his debut single, given Gordon had already released it, but was overruled by the label. He joked, "Thank goodness they talked me out of my stupidity." The single release of the song, backed by "You're My Favorite Waste of Time", was a moderate chart hit in the United States, reaching number 36 on the Billboard chart and number 31 on the Cashbox chart. The single would be Crenshaw's only top 40 hit. The song was also released on his 1982 debut album, Marshall Crenshaw.

The music video for "Someday Someway" came from a concert Crenshaw played in San Francisco. Crenshaw later explained, "Warner Brothers sent a film crew, three cameras, and they sent a sound truck with a multi-track recording set up and they documented the show. Their purpose in doing that was to send out VHS tapes to all of the distributors to let people know what we were about and what we looked like and sounded like. Back in the day, that concert was shown on MTV a couple of times and the video for 'Someday, Someway' from taken from that show as well." An archival release of the San Francisco concert was released in 2017.

== Critical reception ==
At the time of its release, "Someday, Someway" saw positive reception from critics. In a 1982 review of Marshall Crenshaw for Billboard, Thomas Gabriel praised the song's "lean, emotionally direct lyrics" and noted that the song's bridge is just as catchy as its melody.

The song has since seen critical acclaim and has been praised as one of Crenshaw's best songs. Jim Bessman of Billboard called the song a "masterful pop creation" while Dave McKenna of The Washington Post called the song "irresistible". Don Harrison of Richmond Magazine called the song "impossibly catchy" and Juliet Pennington of The Boston Globe said the song was "such a catchy tune that you can't get it out of your head after you hear it".

"Someday, Someway" has been called Crenshaw's signature song. Crenshaw later said of the song, "I still like it just fine, and I especially like the record we did. The tempo and groove are just perfect, it doesn't sound dated and maybe never will, it's just good." Crenshaw continues to perform the song live.

== Charts ==
Chart (1982)	Peak position
US Billboard Hot 100	36
US Mainstream Rock (Billboard)	25
US Cash Box Top 100	31
Australia (Kent Music Report)	57

== S Club 7 cover ==
British pop group, S Club 7 recorded a version of the song as a B-side for their 2000 single, "Reach". The group also performed their version during episode ten ("Making Movies") of their TV show, L.A. 7.
