= Warrior (Scandal album) =

Studio album by Scandal
- Released: August 21, 1984
- Recorded: August 1983 – January 1984
- Studio: The Record Plant (New York City)
- Genre: AOR; pop rock
- Length: 43:19
- Label: Columbia
- Producer: Mike Chapman

Scandal chronology
Scandal (1982)	Warrior (1984)	Scandalous (1992)

Singles from Warrior
- 1. "The Warrior" Released: June 1984; 2. "Hands Tied" Released: October 1984; 3. "Beat of a Heart" Released: January 1985

Professional ratings
Review scores
Source	Rating
AllMusic	2.5/5 stars
Robert Christgau	C

Warrior is the debut and only full-length studio album by American rock band Scandal, credited on the cover as "Scandal featuring Patty Smyth". It was released on August 21, 1984, by Columbia Records.

The album peaked at No. 17 on the Billboard 200 chart, driven by the success of its lead single, "The Warrior", which became the band's biggest hit.

In 2014, the album was reissued in an expanded and remastered edition by Rock Candy Records. This edition included five bonus tracks from Scandal's 1982 self-titled debut EP, Scandal.

== Track listing ==
No.	Title	Writer(s)	Length
1.	"The Warrior"	Holly Knight, Nick Gilder	4:00
2.	"Beat of a Heart"	Zack Smith, Patty Smyth, Keith Mack	4:46
3.	"Hands Tied"	Knight, Chapman	4:07
4.	"Less Than Half"	Smith, Smyth, Mack	4:18
5.	"Only the Young"	Steve Perry, Jonathan Cain, Neal Schon	4:29
6.	"All I Want"	Smith, Smyth, Benjy King	4:11
7.	"Talk to Me"	Doug Lubahn	3:56
8.	"Say What You Will"	Smith, Smyth	4:41
9.	"Tonight"	Smith, Smyth	4:19
10.	"Maybe We Went Too Far"	Smith, Smyth, Mack	4:50

2014 collector's edition bonus tracks (from the Scandal EP)
No.	Title	Writer(s)	Length
11.	"Goodbye to You"	Smith	3:46
12.	"Love's Got a Line on You"	Smith, Kathe Green	3:24
13.	"Win Some, Lose Some"	Bryan Adams, Jim Vallance, Eric Kagna, Paul Dean	3:47
14.	"She Can't Say No"	Smith, Smyth	4:21
15.	"Another Bad Love"	Smith, Smyth	3:35

== Charts ==
Chart (1984)	Position
United States (Billboard 200)	17
Australia (Kent Music Report)	70

== Certifications ==
Region	Certification	Certified units/sales
United States (RIAA)	Platinum	1,000,000^{^}
^{^} Shipments figures based on certification alone.

== Personnel ==
Scandal

- Patty Smyth – lead vocals
- Zack Smith – guitar, background vocals
- Ivan Elias – bass guitar
- Keith Mack – guitar, background vocals
- Thommy Price – drums, background vocals

Additional musicians

- Peter Wood – synthesizer
- Pat Mastelotto – drums on "Only the Young"
- Andy Newmark – drums on "Less Than Half" (Note: On the album sleeve, Newmark is credited with drums on "Hands Tied"; however, some drummers believe he actually played on "Less Than Half" instead, citing the complex rhythm pattern characteristic of his style.)
- Franke Previte – background vocals on "Hands Tied"
- Norman Mershon – background vocals on "Hands Tied"

== Production ==
- Mike Chapman - producer
- John Agnello, David Alhert, Carol Cafiero, John Davenport, Eddie Garcia, Dave Hernandez, Greg Mack, William Wittman, Gene Wooley - engineering
- John Davenport, William Wittman, David Alhert, Gene Wooley - mixing
- LP dead-wax reads "A Disgusting Pile of Guts" on the A-side; the B-side reads "I Like That About Myself"

== Chart performance ==
The album spent 41 weeks on the U.S. Billboard 200 chart and peaked at No. 17 in early October 1984.
