= List of keyboardists =

The following are notable keyboard players, mostly in the fields of metal, rock, and jazz.

Only add names here if the person has their own article - anything else will be removed.

== A ==
- Terry Adams (NRBQ, The Minus 5)
- Jim Adkins (Jimmy Eat World)
- Nat Adderley Jr.
- Don Airey (Rainbow, Ozzy Osbourne, Deep Purple, Whitesnake)
- Damon Albarn (The Good, the Bad & the Queen, Blur)
- Art Alexakis (Everclear)
- Dottie Alexander (of Montreal)
- Kris Allen
- Andrew Horowitz (Tally Hall)
- Gregg Allman (The Allman Brothers Band)
- Tori Amos
- Andre Andersen (Royal Hunt)
- Gladstone Anderson
- Benny Andersson (Hep Stars, ABBA, Benny Anderssons Orkester)
- Rod Argent (The Zombies, Argent)
- Billie Joe Armstrong (Green Day)
- Kenneth Ascher
- Daniel Ash (Bauhaus)
- Tony Ashton
- Lorentz Aspen (Theatre of Tragedy)
- Brian Auger
- Bryce Avary (The Rocket Summer)
- Mark Avsec (Wild Cherry, Donnie Iris & the Cruisers)
- Caroline Azar (Fifth Column)

== B ==
- Guy Babylon (Elton John Band)
- Leroy Bach (Wilco)
- Burt Bacharach
- Wally Badarou (Compass Point All Stars)
- Anita Baker
- Bam Margera (Gnarkill)
- Nick "Peanut" Baines (Kaiser Chiefs)
- Alex Band (The Calling)
- Marcia Ball
- Louis Banks
- Tony Banks (Genesis)
- Robert Banks
- Hugh Banton (Van der Graaf Generator)
- Tommy Barbarella (The New Power Generation)
- Richard Barbieri (Japan, Porcupine Tree)
- Peter Bardens (Camel)
- H. B. Barnum
- Mike Barson (Madness)
- Mark Batson (Aftermath Entertainment, Hollywood Records)
- Harold Battiste
- Eric Bazilian (The Hooters)
- Paul Beaver
- Beck
- Barry Beckett (Muscle Shoals Rhythm Section, Traffic)
- Brian Bell (Weezer, Space Twins, The Relationship)
- Richard Bell (Janis Joplin, The Band)
- Thom Bell (MFSB, Elton John)
- Matt Bellamy (Muse)
- Marco Benevento (Benevento/Russo Duo)
- Jay Bennett (Wilco)
- Howard Benson
- Jeff Bhasker
- Mickey Billingham (Dexys Midnight Runners, General Public, The Beat)
- Diane Birch
- Roy Bittan (E Street Band)
- James Booker
- Perry Botkin Jr.
- Roddy Bottum (Faith No More)
- David Bowie
- Owen Bradley
- Michelle Branch
- David Briggs (Muscle Shoals Rhythm Section, Area Code 615, Elvis Presley, The Nashville A-Team)
- Tom Brislin (Spiraling)
- Gary Brooker (Procol Harum)
- Dudley Brooks (Elvis Presley)
- Drew Brown (OneRepublic)
- James Brown
- Michael Brown (The Left Banke)
- Tony Brown (Elvis Presley, The Notorious Cherry Bombs, Reba McEntire, George Strait, Vince Gill, Wynonna Judd)
- Jackson Browne
- Dave Brubeck
- Jack Bruce (Cream)
- David Bryan (Bon Jovi)
- Kim Bullard
- John Bundrick (The Who, Free, Bob Marley, Johnny Nash)
- Kate Bush
- Artie Butler
- Larry Butler
- Ray Buttigieg
- Brad Buxer
- Bobby Byrd (The J.B.'s)
- Joseph Byrd (The United States of America)
- David Byrne (Talking Heads)

== C ==
- Eduardo Cabra (Calle 13)
- Brian Cadd (The Flying Burrito Brothers)
- Charlotte Caffey (The Go-Go's)
- Jonathan Cain (Journey)
- Joey Calderazzo
- John Cale (The Velvet Underground)
- Ronnie Caldwell (The Bar-Kays)
- Bernie Calvert (The Hollies)
- Tony Camillo
- Michel Camilo
- Richie Cannata (Billy Joel Band)
- Tony Carey (Rainbow)
- Jon Carin (Pink Floyd, Roger Waters)
- Rivers Cuomo (Weezer)
- Vanessa Carlton
- Jesse Carmichael (Maroon 5)
- Tim Carmon
- Richard Carpenter (The Carpenters)
- Chris Carrabba (Dashboard Confessional)
- Paul Carrack (Ace, Roxy Music, Squeeze)
- Gonzalo Carrera (Karnataka, Landmarq)
- Bob Casale (Devo)
- Gerald Casale (Devo)
- Harry Wayne Casey (KC and the Sunshine Band)
- David Cassidy
- Leonard Caston Jr. (Chess Records, Motown Records)
- Felix Cavaliere (The Rascals)
- Rob Cavallo
- Bill Champlin (Chicago)
- Nathan Chapman
- Ray Charles
- Desmond Child
- Jeff Chimenti (RatDog, The Dead)
- Peter Christopherson (Throbbing Gristle)
- Chick Churchill (Ten Years After)
- Neil Cicierega (Lemon Demon)
- Alan Clark (Dire Straits, Eric Clapton)
- Gene Clark (The Byrds)
- Charlie Clouser (Nine Inch Nails)
- David Bennett Cohen (Country Joe and the Fish)
- Katie Cole (The Smashing Pumpkins)
- Jaz Coleman (Killing Joke)
- Lisa Coleman (The Revolution)
- Rahn Coleman (The Love Unlimited Orchestra)
- Phil Collins
- Jeff Cook (Alabama)
- Rob Coombes (Supergrass)
- Jerry Corbetta (Sugarloaf)
- Chick Corea (Return to Forever)
- Billy Corgan (The Smashing Pumpkins)
- Dave "Baby" Cortez
- Alessandro Cortini (Nine Inch Nails)
- Tom Coster (Santana)
- Blair Cowan (Lloyd Cole and the Commotions)
- Nathan "Nadaddy" Currin (Family Force 5)
- Floyd Cramer
- Vincent Crane (Arthur Brown)
- Dave Crawford
- Jesse Crawford
- Andy Creeggan (Barenaked Ladies)
- Max Crook (Del Shannon)
- David Crosby (The Byrds, Crosby, Stills, Nash & Young)
- David Cross (King Crimson)
- Sheryl Crow
- Brian Culbertson
- Burton Cummings (The Guess Who)
- Joel Cummins (Umphrey's McGee)
- Martin Crandall (The Shins)
- Otis Lee Crenshaw

== D ==
- Bobby Dall (Poison)
- Danger Mouse
- Dan Swanö
- Jerry Dammers (The Specials)
- Jay Darlington (Kula Shaker, Oasis)
- Jeremy Dawson (Shiny Toy Guns)
- Ray Davies (The Kinks)
- Rick Davies (Supertramp)
- Paul Davis
- deadmau5
- El DeBarge
- Lenny Dee
- Frank Delgado (Deftones)
- Austin de Lone
- Tom DeLonge (Blink-182)
- Al De Lory
- Jay DeMarcus (Rascal Flatts)
- Ian Dench (EMF, Stargate)
- Sandy Denny
- Jimmy Destri (Blondie)
- Dennis DeYoung (Styx)
- Travis Dickerson (Buckethead)
- Jim Dickinson (The Dixie Flyers, Mud Boy and the Neutrons)
- Mike Dirnt (Green Day)
- Vince DiFiore (Cake)
- Ronnie James Dio
- Gabe Dixon (The Gabe Dixon Band)
- Craig Doerge (Judy Henske, Crosby, Stills and Nash, The Section, James Taylor, Jackson Browne)
- Thomas Dolby
- Fats Domino
- Dan Donovan (Big Audio Dynamite, Dreadzone)
- Neal Doughty (REO Speedwagon)
- Chip Douglas (The Monkees, The Turtles)
- Geoff Downes (Yes, Asia, The Buggles)
- Tyrone Downie (Bob Marley and the Wailers, Compass Point All Stars)
- Candida Doyle (Pulp)
- Lamont Dozier
- Dr. Dre
- Dr. John
- Dr. Luke
- Daryl Dragon (Captain & Tennille)
- Dennis Drew (10,000 Maniacs)
- Christopher Dudley (Underoath)
- George Duke (Frank Zappa and The Mothers of Invention)
- Larry Dunn (Earth, Wind & Fire)
- Stacy DuPree (Eisley)
- Ruth Dyson

== E ==
- Mark Eddinger (Butthole Surfers)
- The Edge (U2)
- Joe Egan (Stealers Wheel)
- Mike Elizondo
- Joe Elliott (Def Leppard)
- Keith Emerson (The Nice, Emerson, Lake & Palmer, 3)
- Bobby Emmons (The Memphis Boys)
- Brian Eno (Roxy Music)
- Jerry Eubanks (The Marshall Tucker Band)
- John Evan (Jethro Tull)
- Tommy Eyre

== F ==
- Donald Fagen (Steely Dan, Jay and the Americans, The Dukes of September)
- Harold Faltermeyer
- Andrew Farriss (INXS)
- Danny Federici (E Street Band)
- Don Felder (Eagles)
- Eric Drew Feldman (Captain Beefheart)
- Jay Ferguson
- Russell Ferrante (Yellowjackets)
- Doug Fieger (The Knack)
- Billy Field
- Robin Finck (Nine Inch Nails)
- Mike Finnigan
- Matthew Fisher (Procol Harum)
- Alan Fitzgerald (Night Ranger)
- Five for Fighting
- Roberta Flack
- Flea (Red Hot Chili Peppers)
- Andrew Fletcher (Depeche Mode)
- Guy Fletcher (Dire Straits, Mark Knopfler)
- Brandon Flowers (The Killers)
- Dan Fogelberg
- John Fogerty (Creedence Clearwater Revival)
- Ben Folds (Ben Folds Five)
- Jerome Fontamillas (Switchfoot)
- Dane Forrest (The Scene)
- David Foster
- David Frank (The System)
- Stan Free (Hot Butter, The Monkees, The Four Seasons, The Association)
- Bobby Freeman
- Ernie Freeman
- Jason Freese
- David Freiberg (Jefferson Starship)
- Glenn Frey (Eagles)
- Robert Fripp (King Crimson)
- Eloy Fritsch (Apocalypse)
- Mitchell Froom
- Craig Frost (Grand Funk Railroad, Silver Bullet Band)
- Magne Furuholmen (a-ha)
- Ming Freeman (Yanni)
- John Frusciante (Red Hot Chili Peppers)

== G ==
- Geir Bratland (Dimmu Borgir)
- Peter Gabriel
- Madonna Wayne Gacy (Marilyn Manson)
- Lady Gaga
- Mick(ey) Gallagher (Ian Dury and the Blockheads, Peter Frampton, The Clash)
- Mike Garson
- Boom Gaspar (Pearl Jam, Neil Young)
- Bob Gaudio (The Royal Teens, The Four Seasons)
- Marvin Gaye
- Chris Geddes (Belle and Sebastian)
- Maurice Gibb (Bee Gees)
- Ian Gibbons (The Kinks)
- Richard Gibbs (Oingo Boingo)
- Jon Gibson
- Gillian Gilbert (New Order)
- Charlie Gillingham (Train, Counting Crows)
- Charles Giordano (E Street Band, The Sessions Band, Pat Benatar)
- Gregg Giuffria (Angel, Giuffria, House of Lords)
- Keith Godchaux (Grateful Dead)
- Dwayne Goettel (Skinny Puppy, Download, Doubting Thomas)
- Andrew Gold
- Loren Gold (The Who, Roger Daltrey, Chicago (band), Kenny Loggins)
- Barry Goldberg (Electric Flag)
- Larry Goldings
- Paul Gordon (Goo Goo Dolls)
- Martin Gore (Depeche Mode)
- Lawrence Gowan (Styx)
- Kamal Gray (The Roots)
- Dave Greenfield (The Stranglers)
- Jimmy Greenspoon (Three Dog Night)
- Al Greenwood (Foreigner)
- Jonny Greenwood (Radiohead)
- Peter Griesar (Dave Matthews Band)
- Gary Griffin
- Paul Griffin
- Johnny Griffith (The Funk Brothers)
- Franny Griffiths (Space)
- Don Grolnick

== H ==
- Joe Hahn (Linkin Park)
- Emily Haines (Metric)
- Daryl Hall (Hall & Oates)
- Ellis Hall (Tower of Power)
- Jan Hammer (The Mahavishnu Orchestra)
- Peter Hammill (Van der Graaf Generator)
- Herbie Hancock (The Headhunters)
- Taylor Hanson (Hanson)
- Glen Hardin
- Mikko Härkin (Sonata Arctica)
- Paul Harris
- George Harrison (The Beatles, Traveling Wilburys)
- Jerry Harrison (Talking Heads)
- Matthieu Hartley (The Cure)
- Dan Hartman
- Steve Harwell (Smash Mouth)
- Donny Hathaway
- Greg Hawkes (The Cars)
- Isaac Hayes
- Scott Healy (The Max Weinberg 7)
- Kevin Hearn (Barenaked Ladies)
- John Helliwell (Supertramp)
- Jimi Hendrix
- Ken Hensley (Uriah Heep)
- Fredrik Hermansson (Pain of Salvation)
- Beau Hill (Spider, then Shanghai)
- Dusty Hill (ZZ Top)
- Charles Hodges (Hi Rhythm Section)
- David Hodges
- Roger Hodgson (Supertramp)
- Dexter Holland (The Offspring)
- Jools Holland (Squeeze)
- Richard Holmes (organist)
- Tuomas Holopainen (Nightwish)
- James Hooker (Amazing Rhythm Aces)
- Nicky Hopkins
- Bruce Hornsby
- Paul Hornsby (The Marshall Tucker Band)
- Andrew Horowitz (Tally Hall)
- Simon House (Hawkwind)
- James Newton Howard
- Garth Hudson (The Band)
- Joey Huffman
- Peter Hume (Evermore)
- Paul Humphreys (Orchestral Manoeuvres in the Dark)
- Joe Hunter (The Funk Brothers, John Lee Hooker, Dennis Edwards, The Hesitations)
- Dick Hyman
- Rob Hyman (The Hooters)

== I ==
- Mitsuru Igarashi (Every Little Thing)
- Ihsahn (Emperor, Ihsahn)
- Giovanna Joyce Imbesi
- Doug Ingle (Iron Butterfly)
- Russ Irwin (Aerosmith, Sting, Clay Aiken, Bryan Adams)

== J ==
- Janet Jackson
- Joe Jackson
- Michael Jackson
- Randy Jackson (The Jacksons)
- Rami Jaffee (The Wallflowers, Foo Fighters)
- Mick Jagger (The Rolling Stones)
- Bob James (Fourplay, Phil Collins, Quincy Jones, Paul Simon)
- Rick James
- Chas Jankel (Ian Dury and the Blockheads)
- Keith Jarrett
- John Barlow Jarvis
- Chris Jasper (The Isley Brothers)
- Jonas Jeberg
- Arthur Jenkins
- Eddie Jobson (Curved Air, Roxy Music, Jethro Tull, Frank Zappa)
- Billy Joel
- Jens Johansson (Yngwie Malmsteen, Stratovarius)
- Elton John
- Matt Johnson (Jamiroquai)
- Bruce Johnston (The Beach Boys)
- Nick Jonas (Jonas Brothers)
- Howard Jones
- John Paul Jones (Led Zeppelin, Them Crooked Vultures)
- Booker T. Jones (Booker T. & the M.G.'s)
- Brian Jones (The Rolling Stones)
- Craig Jones (Slipknot)
- Melvyn "Deacon" Jones (Baby Huey & the Babysitters, Curtis Mayfield, Curtom Records, John Lee Hooker, Freddie King)
- Norah Jones
- Lonnie Jordan (War)
- Mikael Jorgensen (Wilco)
- Bradley Joseph (Sheena Easton, Yanni)
- Jascha Richter (MLTR)
- Tyler Joseph (Twenty One Pilots)
- Seth Justman (The J. Geils Band)

== K ==
- Tony Kakko (Sonata Arctica)
- Artie Kane
- Doug Katsaros
- Bob Katsionis (Septic Flesh, Firewind)
- Tony Kaye (Yes, Flash, Badger, Detective, David Bowie, Badfinger, Yoso, Circa)
- Howard Kaylan (The Turtles)
- Jeff Kazee (Southside Johnny and the Asbury Jukes, Jon Bon Jovi)
- Shane Keister
- Randy Kerber
- Richard Kermode (Janis Joplin, Santana)
- Ron Kersey (MFSB, The Trammps, Salsoul Orchestra)
- Bert Keyes
- Alicia Keys
- Mark Kelly (Marillion)
- R. Kelly
- Chris Kilmore (Incubus)
- Carole King
- Robbie King (Bobby Taylor & the Vancouvers, Skylark, The Hometown Band, Bryan Adams)
- Henrik Klingenberg (Sonata Arctica)
- Larry Knechtel (The Wrecking Crew, Bread, Paul Simon, Smith, Los Angeles musicians)
- Holly Knight (Device, Spider)
- Steve Knight (Mountain)
- Josh Klinghoffer (Red Hot Chili Peppers)
- Al Kooper (Bob Dylan, The Royal Teens, Blood, Sweat & Tears, Lynyrd Skynyrd, Mike Bloomfield, The Blues Project)
- Kornelije Kovač (Indexi, Korni Grupa)
- Dave Kikoski
- Lenny Kravitz
- Chantal Kreviazuk
- Greg Kuehn (T.S.O.L.)

== L ==
- Les Smith (ex-Anathema, ex-Cradle of Filth)
- Jef Labes (Van Morrison, Bonnie Raitt)
- Robert Lamm (Chicago)
- Allen Lanier (Blue Öyster Cult)
- Dustin Lanker (Cherry Poppin' Daddies, The Visible Men)
- Avril Lavigne
- T Lavitz (Dixie Dregs)
- Ben Leach (The Farm)
- Chuck Leavell (The Allman Brothers Band, Sea Level, The Rolling Stones)
- Amy Lee (Evanescence)
- Geddy Lee (Rush)
- Jerry Lee Lewis
- Bill Leeb (Front Line Assembly)
- John Lefler (Dashboard Confessional)
- John Legend
- Tom Lehrer
- Bernie Leighton
- John Lennon (The Beatles, Plastic Ono Band)
- Joe Lester (Silversun Pickups)
- Pete Levin (Gil Evans Orchestra)
- Mike Levine (Triumph)
- Howard Levy (Bela Fleck and the Flecktones)
- Earl Lindo (Bob Marley and the Wailers)
- John Linnell (They Might Be Giants)
- Little Richard
- Kerry Livgren (Kansas)
- John Locke (Spirit, Nazareth)
- Daniel Lopatin (The Weeknd)
- Jon Lord (Deep Purple, Whitesnake)
- Christian Lorenz (Rammstein)
- Chris Lowe (Pet Shop Boys)
- Billy Lyall (Pilot)
- Jeff Lynne (The Move)

== M ==
- Tony MacAlpine
- Brian "Too Loud" MacLeod (Chilliwack, Headpins)
- Ron Mael (Sparks)
- Les Maguire (Gerry and the Pacemakers)
- Raine Maida (Our Lady Peace)
- Bob Malone
- Mark Mancina (Yes)
- Fred Mandel (Queen, Elton John Band, Cheap Trick, Alice Cooper)
- Manfred Mann (Manfred Mann, Manfred Mann Chapter Three, Manfred Mann's Earth Band)
- Roger Joseph Manning Jr. (Jellyfish, Blink-182, Imperial Drag, TV Eyes)
- Richard Manuel (The Band)
- Ray Manzarek (The Doors)
- Anthony Marinelli (Michael Jackson, Kenny Loggins)
- Chris Marion (Little River Band)
- Bruno Mars
- Tommy Mars (Frank Zappa)
- Chris Martin (Coldplay)
- Max Martin
- Harvey Mason Jr. (The Underdogs)
- Brian May (Queen)
- Bob Mayo (Peter Frampton)
- Lincoln Mayorga
- Lyle Mays (Pat Metheny Group)
- Nick McCarthy (Franz Ferdinand)
- Linda McCartney (Wings)
- Paul McCartney (The Beatles, Wings, The Fireman)
- Glenn McClelland (Ween, Blood, Sweat & Tears)
- Page McConnell (Phish)
- Clarence McDonald
- Ian McDonald (King Crimson, Foreigner)
- Michael McDonald (The Doobie Brothers)
- Richie McDonald (Lonestar)
- Jimmy McGriff
- Roger McGuinn (The Byrds)
- Goldy McJohn (Steppenwolf, Janis Joplin)
- Bonnie McKee
- Ron "Pigpen" McKernan (Grateful Dead)
- Brian McKnight
- Sarah McLachlan
- Ian McLagan (The Rolling Stones, The Faces, Rod Stewart)
- Gabrial McNair (No Doubt)
- Christine McVie (Fleetwood Mac)
- Jonathan Melvoin (The Smashing Pumpkins, The Revolution)
- Mike Melvoin (The Wrecking Crew)
- Bridgit Mendler
- Freddie Mercury (Queen)
- Augie Meyers (Sir Douglas Quintet, Texas Tornados)
- Mic Michaeli (Europe, Brazen Abbot)
- Lee Michaels
- Max Middleton (Jeff Beck, Hummingbird)
- Amos Milburn
- Barry Miles
- Steve Miller (Steve Miller Band)
- Mike Mills (R.E.M.)
- Kerry Minnear (Gentle Giant)
- Paul Mirkovich
- Joni Mitchell
- Jim Moginie (Midnight Oil)
- Money Mark (Beastie Boys)
- Kevin Moore (Dream Theater)
- Brian Molko (Placebo)
- Patrick Moraz (The Moody Blues, Yes)
- Gordon Mote
- Mark Mothersbaugh (Devo)
- Jamie Muhoberac
- Larry Muhoberac (Elvis Presley)
- Stan Munsey (Shenandoah)
- Mustis (ex-Dimmu Borgir)
- Brent Mydland (Grateful Dead)
- Thelonious Monk

== N ==
- Graham Nash (The Hollies, Crosby, Stills, Nash & Young)
- Steve Nathan (Muscle Shoals Rhythm Section, The Nashville A-Team)
- Bobbie Nelson (The Family)
- Art Neville (The Meters, Allen Toussaint, The Neville Brothers)
- Ivan Neville (The Neville Brothers, Keith Richards, Spin Doctors)
- Randy Newman
- Nico
- Steve Nieve (Elvis Costello)
- Takahiro Nishikawa (formerly of Dreams Come True)
- Jack Nitzsche (The Wrecking Crew, The Rolling Stones, Crazy Horse, Willy DeVille)
- Erik Norlander
- Christopher North (Ambrosia)
- Aldo Nova
- Krist Novoselic (Nirvana, Flipper, Eyes Adrift, Mike Watt)
- Geoff Nicholls (Black Sabbath)
- Peter Noone (Herman's Hermits)

== O ==
- Roger O'Donnell (The Cure)
- Bobby Ogdin (Elvis Presley, The Marshall Tucker Band)
- Mike Oldfield
- Spooner Oldham (FAME Studios, Muscle Shoals Rhythm Section, Dan Penn, Neil Young)
- Michael Omartian
- William Orbit
- Alan Osmond (The Osmonds)

== P ==
- Augustus Pablo
- David Paich (Toto)
- Amanda Palmer
- Oliver Palotai (Kamelot, Sons of Seasons)
- Lou Pardini (Chicago)
- Ian Parker (The Hollies, Tom Robinson Band)
- Van Dyke Parks
- Alan Parsons (The Alan Parsons Project)
- Alan Pasqua (Damn Yankees)
- Bill Payne (Little Feat, Leftover Salmon, Linda Ronstadt, Phil Lesh and Friends, The Doobie Brothers)
- Ryan Peake (Nickelback)
- Freddie Perren (The Corporation, The Jackson 5, The Sylvers, Dino Fekaris)
- Jerry Peters
- Oscar Peterson
- Kate Pierson (The B-52's)
- Leena Peisa (Lordi)
- Leon Pendarvis (Saturday Night Live Band, The Blues Brothers)
- Alex Pennie (The Automatic)
- Jim Peterik (Survivor)
- Greg Phillinganes (Quincy Jones, Stevie Wonder, The Pussycat Dolls, Bruno Mars, Michael Jackson, Toto)
- Scott Phillips (Creed, Alter Bridge)
- Mike Pinder (The Moody Blues)
- Michael Pinnella (Symphony X)
- Dan Pinto
- Dave Pirner (Soul Asylum)
- Chris Pitman (Guns N' Roses)
- Tuomas Planman (Norther)
- Morris Pleasure
- Steve Porcaro (Toto)
- Grace Potter (Grace Potter and the Nocturnals, Kenny Chesney)
- Billy Powell (Lynyrd Skynyrd)
- Martin Powell (ex-Cradle of Filth)
- Roger Powell (Todd Rundgren, David Bowie)
- Vlado Pravdić (Bijelo Dugme)
- Billy Preston
- Don Preston (Frank Zappa and The Mothers of Invention, Abnuceals Emuukha Electric Symphony Orchestra)
- Alan Price (The Animals)
- Prince
- Professor Longhair
- Vadim Pruzhanov (DragonForce)
- Bill Pursell
- Janne Puurtinen (HIM)

== R ==
- A. R. Rahman
- Ronnie Rancifer (The Jackson 5)
- Don Randi (The Wrecking Crew)
- Mike Ratledge (Soft Machine)
- Allen Ravenstine (Pere Ubu)
- Paul Raymond (UFO, Savoy Brown, Plastic Penny)
- Eddie Rayner (Split Enz, The Makers)
- Jason Rebello (Jeff Beck, Sting)
- Dizzy Reed (Guns N' Roses)
- Ellen Reid (Crash Test Dummies)
- Trent Reznor (Nine Inch Nails)
- Doug Rhodes (The Music Machine, The Millennium)
- Nick Rhodes (Duran Duran)
- Tim Rice-Oxley (Keane)
- Lionel Richie
- Jascha Richter (Michael Learns to Rock)
- Doug Riley
- Laza Ristovski (Smak, Bijelo Dugme)
- Billy Ritchie (Clouds)
- Tyson Ritter (The All-American Rejects)
- Hargus "Pig" Robbins (The Nashville A-Team)
- J. Peter Robinson
- Ed Roland (Collective Soul)
- Gregg Rolie (Santana, Journey, Ringo Starr)
- Matt Rollings (Mark Knopfler, Willie Nelson, Lyle Lovett, Alison Krauss, Mary Chapin Carpenter, George Strait, Keith Urban)
- David Rosenthal (Rainbow, Billy Joel Band)
- Chris Ross (Wolfmother)
- Share Ross (The Dogs D'Amour)
- Jean Roussel
- Michel Rubini (The Wrecking Crew)
- Jordan Rudess (Dream Theater, The Dixie Dregs)
- Vic Ruggiero (The Slackers)
- Patrice Rushen (CAB)
- Leon Russell
- Francis Rimbert
- Ryuichi Sakamoto (Yellow Magic Orchestra)

== S ==
- Stian Aarstad (ex-Dimmu Borgir)
- Joe Sample (The Crusaders, B.B. King, George Benson, Eric Clapton, L.A. Express, Joni Mitchell, Los Angeles musicians)
- David Sancious (E Street Band, Santana, Jeff Beck, Sting)
- Pat Sansone (Wilco)
- Merl Saunders (Grateful Dead)
- Satyr (Satyricon, Wongraven)
- Rick Savage (Def Leppard)
- Tony Scalzo (Fastball)
- Falk Maria Schlegel (Powerwolf)
- Artie Schroeck
- Ralph Schuckett (Utopia, Carole King, Bette Midler, Moogy Klingman, Sophie B. Hawkins)
- Klaus Schulze (Ash Ra Tempel, Tangerine Dream)
- James Honeyman-Scott (The Pretenders)
- Brady Seals (Little Texas)
- Pete Sears (Rod Stewart, Jefferson Starship)
- John Sebastian (The Lovin' Spoonful)
- Neil Sedaka
- Bob Seger
- Matt Serletic
- Paul Shaffer (CBS Orchestra, Saturday Night Live Band, The Blues Brothers)
- John Shanks
- Lee Shapiro (Frankie Valli and the Four Seasons)
- John Philip Shenale
- Derek Sherinian (Dream Theater, Planet X, Alice Cooper, Yngwie Malmsteen)
- Greg Sherman (Glass)
- Mike Shinoda (Linkin Park)
- Ben Sidran (Steve Miller Band)
- Bunny Sigler (Gamble and Huff, Curtis Mayfield, Curtom Records, MFSB, Salsoul Orchestra)
- Erna Siikavirta (Lordi)
- Josh Silver (Type O Negative)
- John Simon
- Claudio Simonetti (Goblin)
- Dave Sinclair (Caravan)
- Ray Singleton
- Matt Skiba (Blink-182, Alkaline Trio)
- Jocke Skog (Clawfinger)
- Martin Slattery (The Mescaleros, The Hours)
- Grace Slick (Jefferson Airplane)
- George Small (John Lennon, Carl Perkins, John Phillips, Eric Clapton)
- Mike Smith (The Dave Clark Five)
- Robert Smith (The Cure)
- Rosie Smith (Cradle of Filth)
- Toby Smith (Jamiroquai)
- William "Smitty" Smith
- C. J. Snare (FireHouse)
- Tom Snow
- Richard Sohl (Patti Smith Group)
- Zsa Zsa Speck (Marilyn Manson)
- Martijn Spierenburg (Within Temptation)
- Chris Stainton (Joe Cocker's Grease Band)
- Baby Lloyd Stallworth
- Justin Stanley (Noiseworks)
- Mark Stanway (Magnum, Grand Slam)
- Alex Staropoli (Rhapsody of Fire)
- Margita Stefanović (Ekatarina Velika)
- Mark Stein (Vanilla Fudge)
- Louie Stephens (Rooney)
- William "Mickey" Stevenson
- Ian Stewart (The Rolling Stones)
- Stephen Stills (Buffalo Springfield, Crosby, Stills, Nash & Young)
- Sting (The Police)
- Rose Stone (Sly and the Family Stone)
- Sly Stone (Sly and the Family Stone)
- Barrett Strong
- Andy Summers (The Police)
- Bernard Sumner (New Order, Joy Division, Electronic)
- Sun Ra
- Rob Swire (Pendulum, Knife Party)
- David Sylvian (Japan)

== T ==
- Mick Talbot (The Merton Parkas, Dexys Midnight Runners, The Bureau, The Style Council)
- Richard Tandy (Electric Light Orchestra)
- Serj Tankian (System of a Down)
- Butch Taylor (Dave Matthews Band, Secrets)
- Roger Taylor (Queen)
- Ryan Tedder (OneRepublic)
- Richard Tee
- Rod Temperton (Heatwave, Michael Jackson, Quincy Jones)
- Joey Tempest (Europe)
- Benmont Tench (Tom Petty and the Heartbreakers, Mudcrutch, Roy Orbison, Johnny Cash, Stevie Nicks, Don Henley, Jon Bon Jovi, Works Progress Administration)
- Matt Thiessen (Relient K, Matthew Thiessen and the Earthquakes)
- Chris Thomas
- Marvell Thomas (The Mar-Keys, The Bar-Kays)
- Rob Thomas (Matchbox Twenty)
- Sonny Thompson
- Justin Timberlake
- Keith Tippett (King Crimson)
- Lol Tolhurst (The Cure)
- Peter Tork (The Monkees)
- Allen Toussaint
- Pete Townshend (The Who)
- Meghan Trainor
- KT Tunstall
- Archie Turner (Hi Rhythm Section)
- Ike Turner (Kings of Rhythm)
- Aphex Twin
- Steven Tyler (Aerosmith)

== U ==
- Ian Underwood (Frank Zappa and The Mothers of Invention)
- Brendon Urie (Panic! at the Disco)
- Michael Utley (The Dixie Flyers, Coral Reefer Band)

== V ==
- Rubén Valtierra ("Weird Al" Yankovic)
- Earl Van Dyke (The Funk Brothers)
- Eddie Van Halen (Van Halen)
- Victoria Asher (Cobra Starship)
- Joe Vitale (Barnstorm, Crosby, Stills, Nash & Young, The Eagles, Ted Nugent)

== W ==
- Jason Wade (Lifehouse)
- Tom Waits
- Adam Wakeman (Black Sabbath, Headspace, Strawbs, Ozzy Osbourne)
- Oliver Wakeman (Yes, Strawbs)
- Rick Wakeman (Yes, David Bowie, Strawbs, Elton John, Anderson Bruford Wakeman Howe, Anderson, Rabin and Wakeman)
- Randy Waldman (Barbra Streisand, Frank Sinatra, Michael Jackson, Michael Bublé, George Benson)
- Butch Walker
- Don Walker (Cold Chisel)
- Johnny "Big Moose" Walker
- Joe Walsh (The Eagles, Barnstorm)
- Steve Walsh (Kansas)
- Harry Waters (Roger Waters)
- Jimmy Webb
- John Webster (Poison, Aerosmith)
- Tina Weymouth (Talking Heads)
- Pete Wingfield
- Nick Wheeler (The All-American Rejects)
- Barry White
- Jack White (The White Stripes)
- Norman Whitfield
- Bobby Whitlock (Eric Clapton, Delaney & Bonnie, George Harrison)
- Carson Whitsett (Malaco Records, The MG's, The Imperial Show Band, Kathy Mattea)
- Per Wiberg (ex-Opeth)
- Paul Wickens (Paul McCartney)
- Alan Wilder (Depeche Mode, Recoil)
- Hayley Williams (Paramore)
- Larry Williams
- Milan Williams (Commodores)
- Ann Wilson (Heart)
- Brian Wilson (The Beach Boys)
- Dan Wilson (Semisonic)
- Mark Wilson (Jet)
- Steven Wilson (Storm Corrosion)
- Kip Winger (Winger)
- Edgar Winter
- Steve Winwood (The Spencer Davis Group, Traffic, Jimi Hendrix, Billy Joel, Phil Collins, Blind Faith, Go)
- Janne Wirman (Children of Bodom)
- Bill Withers
- Peter Wolf (Frank Zappa, Starship)
- Chris Wolstenholme (Muse)
- Stevie Wonder
- Eric Woolfson (The Alan Parsons Project)
- Bernie Worrell (Talking Heads, Funkadelic, The Pretenders)
- Gary Wright (Spooky Tooth, George Harrison, Eric Clapton, Ringo Starr)
- Richard Wright (Pink Floyd)
- Winston Wright (Toots and the Maytals)
- Howard Wyeth
- Richard "Popcorn" Wylie
- Reese Wynans (Double Trouble, Carole King, Captain Beyond, Los Lonely Boys)

== Y ==
- "Weird Al" Yankovic
- Yanni
- Jerry Yester (The Lovin' Spoonful, The Association)
- Jim Yester (The Association, The Lovin' Spoonful)
- Thom Yorke (Radiohead)
- John Young (Scorpions)
- Neil Young
- Doug Yule (The Velvet Underground)

== Z ==
- Aidan Zammit
- Zardonic
- Joe Zawinul (Weather Report)
- Marco Coti Zelati (Lacuna Coil)
- Warren Zevon
- Torrie Zito
- David Zollo
- Nikola Zorić (Riblja Čorba)

== See also ==
- Lists of musicians
