= The Warrior (song) =

1984 single by Scandal

Single by Scandal featuring Patty Smyth

from the album Warrior
- B-side: "Less Than Half"
- Released: June 1984
- Studio: The Record Plant (New York City)
- Genre: Pop-rock; new wave
- Length: 4:00 (album version); 3:35 (7-inch version)
- Label: Columbia
- Songwriters: Nick Gilder; Holly Knight
- Producer: Mike Chapman

Scandal singles chronology
"Win Some, Lose Some" (1983)	"The Warrior" (1984)	"Hands Tied" (1984)

Music video
- "The Warrior" on YouTube

"The Warrior" is a song by American rock band Scandal, fronted by Patty Smyth. Written by Holly Knight and Nick Gilder, the song was included on their debut and sole studio album, Warrior (1984). The song reached number seven in the United States and number one in Canada, as well as number one on the US Billboard Rock Top Tracks chart, and won a BMI Airplay Award in 1984. It was also a hit in Australia, where it peaked at number six, and in New Zealand and South Africa, reaching number 11 in both countries. The music video for the song was directed by David Hahn.

== Background ==
Co-writer Holly Knight said, "I think that idea of being a warrior had been inside me for a long time. I grew up in a somewhat 'dysfunctional' family where there was a lot of drama and fighting. I was always more interested in fighting FOR something rather than fighting with someone, and without being cognizant of it, it was a constant theme in my psyche, and hence, my songs."

== Music video ==
The accompanying music video to "The Warrior" was directed by David Hahn. It featured Smyth and dancers in a sci-fi dystopian environment.

Both Smyth and Holly Knight have stated their dissatisfaction with the video, noting the bizarre costumes and dancing. This sentiment has been shared by other sources, noting the video as "cheesy" and "embarrassing".

== Track listings ==
7-inch single

A. "The Warrior" – 3:35
B. "Less Than Half" – 4:18

12-inch picture disc

A1. "The Warrior"
A2. "Hands Tied"
B1. "Goodbye to You"
B2. "Love's Got a Line on You"

== Charts ==
=== Weekly charts ===
Chart (1984–1985)	Peak position
Australia (Kent Music Report)	6
Canada Top Singles (RPM)	1
New Zealand (Recorded Music NZ)	11
South Africa (Springbok Radio)	11
UK Singles (Official Charts)	86
US Billboard Hot 100	7
US Mainstream Rock Airplay (Billboard)	1

=== Year-end charts ===
Chart (1984)	Position
Australia (Kent Music Report)	62
Canada Top Singles (RPM)	22
US Billboard Hot 100	46

== Certifications ==
Region	Certification	Certified units/sales
Canada (Music Canada)	Platinum	100,000^{^}
^{^} Shipments figures based on certification alone.

== In popular culture ==
The song was used as the opening theme to both the 2017–2019 Netflix television series GLOW, and the 2024 Sonic the Hedgehog spin-off television series Knuckles.
