= Ignition (John Waite album) =

Studio album by John Waite
- Released: May 21, 1982 (Debuted on Billboard's album chart the week ending July 17, 1982)
- Recorded: 1981–1982
- Studio: Power Station, New York City
- Genre: Rock
- Length: 36:22
- Label: Chrysalis
- Producer: Neil Giraldo

John Waite chronology
Ignition (1982)	No Brakes (1984)

Professional ratings
Review scores
Source	Rating
AllMusic	2/5 stars

Ignition is the debut solo album by English singer-songwriter John Waite (ex-vocalist for The Babys). It was released on Chrysalis Records in May 1982 and produced by Neil Giraldo (producer/guitarist for Pat Benatar, who was on the same label).

Two singles were lifted from the record: the Holly Knight-penned "Change" which initially failed to make a significant dent on any chart except for the Hot Mainstream Rock Tracks, where it scored the No. 16 position. It was, however, one of MTV's most popular early videos. Upon the 1985 release of the soundtrack to the film Vision Quest, the single was re-issued and broke into the top 50 on the Pop charts. Its follow-up single (after the initial 1982 release) was "Going to the Top".

A few well-known musicians guested on the album as well. Singer Patty Smyth (then in the band Scandal) handled vocal backing, and drummer Frankie LaRocka (also from Scandal) and bassist Don Nossov (who also played with Benatar) guest here.

== Track listing ==
1. "White Heat" (John Waite) – 3:22
2. "Change" (Holly Knight) – 3:15
3. "Mr. Wonderful" (John Waite, Ivan Kral) – 4:07
4. "Going to the Top" (Waite, Tim Pierce) – 4:36
5. "Desperate Love" (Waite, Kral) – 3:55
6. "Temptation" (Chas Sandford) – 2:59
7. "Be My Baby Tonight" (Waite, Kral) – 3:22
8. "Make It Happen" (Waite, Bruce Brody) – 3:18
9. "Still in Love with You" (Paul Sabu) – 3:42
10. "Wild Life" (Waite, Kral) – 3:23

== Personnel ==
- John Waite – lead vocals
- Bruce Brody – keyboards, pianos
- Ivan Kral – keyboards, pianos, rhythm guitars
- Tim Pierce – lead guitars
- Spyder Downtone Butane James – guitar solo on "Mr. Wonderful"
- Donnie Nossov – bass, backing vocals
- Frankie LaRocka – drums, percussion
- Crispin Cioe – saxophones
- Arno Hecht – saxophones
- "Hollywood Paul" Litteral – trumpets
- Rahni Kugel – backing vocals
- Ilana Morrilo – backing vocals
- Patty Smyth – backing vocals

Handclaps and screams on "White Heat"

- Mark Betz, Brendan Bourke, Dave Lang, Chris Pollan, Suzan, John Waite and John Elijah Wright

== Production ==
- Neil Giraldo – producer, mixing
- Bob Clearmountain – engineer, mixing
- Jeff Hendrickson – engineer
- Neil Dorfsman – assistant engineer
- Bob Ludwig – original mastering at Masterdisk (New York, NY)
- Dave Lang – studio assistant
- Chris Pollan – studio assistant
- Miss Pam – studio assistant
- Jon Astley – remastering
- Sandy Pearman and Dyer/Kahn, Inc. – design
- Brian Aris – photography
