= 22B3 =

Studio album by Device
- Released: 1986
- Recorded: September 1985 – February 1986
- Studio: Cherokee (Hollywood)
- Genre: Hard rock; pop rock
- Length: 49:10
- Label: Chrysalis
- Producer: Mike Chapman

Singles from 22B3
- 1. "Hanging on a Heart Attack" Released: May 12, 1986; 2. "Who Says" Released: September 1986; 3. "Who's on the Line" Released: January 1987

22B3 is the only studio album by the American pop rock band Device, which was released in 1986.

== Track listing ==
All tracks are written by Holly Knight and Mike Chapman, except where indicated.

No.	Title	Writer(s)	Length
1.	"Hanging on a Heart Attack"		5:07
2.	"Who Says"		4:50
3.	"Pieces on the Ground"	Holly Knight; Gene Black	5:55
4.	"Tough and Tender"		4:55
5.	"When Love Is Good"	Knight	4:46
6.	"Didn't I Read You Right"	Knight; Black	4:35
7.	"Fall Apart, Golden Heart"		4:30
8.	"I've Got No Room for Your Love"	Knight; Black	4:58
9.	"Who's on the Line"		6:00
10.	"Sand, Stone, Cobwebs and Dust"		3:34
Total length:			49:10

== Personnel ==
- Paul Engemann – vocals
- Holly Knight – bass, keyboards, drum programming, vocals
- Gene Black – acoustic and electric guitars

== Production ==
- Produced by Mike Chapman
- Recorded by Mike Chapman, with assistance by Brian Scheuble
- Mixed by George Tukto
- Tracks 1–9 published by The Makiki Pub. Co. Ltd./Arista Music Inc.
- Track 10 published by The Makiki Pub. Co. Ltd./Knighty Knight Music/Arista Music Inc.

== Charts ==
Chart (1986)	Peak position
Billboard 200	73

Singles

Single	Chart	Position
"Hanging on a Heart Attack"	Billboard Hot 100	35
"Hanging on a Heart Attack"	Club Play Singles	26
"Hanging on a Heart Attack"	Australia (Kent Music Report)	46
"Hanging on a Heart Attack"	West Germany (GfK)	33
"Who Says"	Billboard Hot 100	79
