= Better Be Good to Me =

- U.S. 12-inch vinyl single

Single by Tina Turner

from the album Private Dancer
- B-side: "When I Was Young"
- Released: September 3, 1984
- Recorded: 1984
- Genre: Rock; new wave
- Length: 5:10 (LP version); 3:43 (single version); 7:47 (extended version)
- Label: Capitol
- Songwriters: Mike Chapman; Holly Knight; Nicky Chinn (not physically present)
- Producer: Rupert Hine

Tina Turner singles chronology
| "What's Love Got to Do with It" (1984) | "Better Be Good to Me" (1984) | "Private Dancer" (1984) |

Music video
- "Better Be Good to Me" on YouTube

"Better Be Good to Me" is a song written by Mike Chapman and Holly Knight and Nicky Chinn, recorded by singer Tina Turner for her solo studio album Private Dancer (1984) and released as a single in early September 1984. The song was originally recorded and released in 1981 by Spider, a band from New York City that featured co-writer Knight as a member. Turner's version peaked at No. 5 on the Billboard Hot 100 in the US and No. 6 on the then-Hot Black Singles charts. At the 27th Annual Grammy Awards in 1985, it won Best Rock Vocal Performance, Female, one of four Grammys awarded to Turner's Private Dancer album at that ceremony. The song was also included on the Miami Vice soundtrack, and the 2024 Paramount Pictures film IF, during which the main characters sing and dance to the track inside the official music video.

== Music video ==
In the video, Turner is seen performing the song on stage, wearing a black leather jacket and black skin-tight, knee-length leather pants, with leopard print high heels and spikey blonde hair. Towards the end, a man (Cy Curnin lead singer of the Fixx) appears on stage and grabs Turner's arms. She looks him in the eyes and sings the words, "Why can't you be good to me?", then pushes him away. At the end of the video, Turner disappears under the stage in a puff of smoke. Both Curnin and the guitarist in the video, Jamie West-Oram (also of the Fixx), perform on the Private Dancer album.

== Personnel ==
- Tina Turner – lead vocals, background vocals
- Rupert Hine – bass guitar, keyboards, percussion, programming, background vocals
- Jamie West-Oram – guitar
- Trevor Morais – drums
- Cy Curnin – background vocals

== Versions and remixes ==
- 7-inch edit – 3:43
- Video edit – 4:05
- Album version – 5:10
- Extended 12-inch Remix – 7:47
- Extended 12-inch Remix (early fade on Private Dancer EMI Centenary Remaster) – 7:03
- Extended 12-inch Hot Tracks Dance Remix - 8:54

== Charts and certifications ==
=== Weekly charts ===
| Chart (1984–1985) | Peak position |
|---|---|
| Australia (Kent Music Report) | 28 |
| Belgium (Ultratop 50 Flanders) | 33 |
| Canada Top Singles (RPM) | 6 |
| Europe (European Top 100) | 93 |
| Germany (Official German Charts) | 52 |
| Guatemala (UPI) | 7 |
| Ireland (IRMA) | 21 |
| Netherlands (Dutch Top 40) | 36 |
| Netherlands (Single Top 100) | 22 |
| New Zealand (Recorded Music NZ) | 22 |
| UK Singles (Official Charts) | 45 |
| US Billboard Hot 100 | 5 |
| US Hot Dance Club Songs (Billboard) | 16 |
| US Hot Black Singles (Billboard) | 6 |
| US Mainstream Rock (Billboard) | 32 |
| US Cash Box Top 100 | 7 |

=== Year-end charts ===
| Chart (1984) | Peak position |
|---|---|
| Canada Top Singles (RPM) | 59 |
| Chart (1985) | Peak position |
| US Billboard Hot 100 | 59 |

=== Certifications and sales ===
| Region | Certification | Certified units/sales |
|---|---|---|
| Canada (Music Canada) | Gold | 50,000^{^} |
^{^} Shipments figures based on certification alone.
