= Hanging on a Heart Attack =

1986 single by Device

Single by Device

from the album 22B3
- B-side: "Hanging on a Heart Attack (Extended Version)"
- Released: May 12, 1986
- Length: 5:07 (album version); 4:02 (single version); 5:58 (extended version)
- Label: Chrysalis
- Songwriters: Holly Knight; Mike Chapman
- Producer: Mike Chapman

Device singles chronology
"Hanging on a Heart Attack" (1986)	"Who Says" (1986)

Music video
- "Hanging on a Heart Attack" on YouTube

"Hanging on a Heart Attack" is a song by American pop rock band Device, released in 1986 as the lead single from their only studio album 22B3. The song was written by Holly Knight and Mike Chapman, and was produced by Chapman. "Hanging on a Heart Attack" peaked at number 35 on the US Billboard Hot 100.

== Music video ==
The song's music video was directed by Brian Grant and produced by Frank Hilton for MGMM Productions. It achieved heavy rotation on MTV and peaked at number 10 on the Cash Box Top 30 Music Videos chart.

== Critical reception ==
Upon its release, Cash Box praised Knight as a "songwriter par excellence" and considered "Hanging on a Heart Attack" to be a "tough and eery rocker that has immediate appeal". The reviewer added that the "strong production and vocals from Paul Engemann highlight this latest Knight gem". Nancy Erlich of Billboard noted that the song's "heavy duty dance beat and snippets of weirdness should please both mainstream and alternative rock crowds". Gavin Report wrote, "Device is meticulously constructed from the ground up – right down to the odd guitar lick and a well timed key change. Straddling the line between Album Radio and Top Forty, a record like [this] pretty much defines the 80s modus operandi of airplay rock." Pan-European magazine Music & Media picked the song as one of their "sure hits" in their issue of 16 August 1986 and noted its "melodic and powerful pop chording".

== Track listing ==
7–inch single (US and Canada)

1. "Hanging on a Heart Attack" – 4:02
2. "Hanging on a Heart Attack" (Extended Version) – 5:58

7–inch single (UK, Europe, South Africa, Australasia and Japan)

1. "Hanging on a Heart Attack" – 4:02
2. "Hanging on a Heart Attack" (Instrumental Version) – 5:58

12–inch single (US and Canada)

1. "Hanging on a Heart Attack" (Dance Mix) – 7:21
2. "Hanging on a Heart Attack" (Dub Version) – 6:37
3. "Hanging on a Heart Attack" (Short Version) – 4:24

12–inch single (UK, Europe and Australasia)

1. "Hanging on a Heart Attack" (Dance Mix) – 7:21
2. "Hanging on a Heart Attack" (Dub Version) – 6:37
3. "Hanging on a Heart Attack" (Instrumental Version) – 5:58

== Personnel ==
Device

- Paul Engemann – lead vocals
- Holly Knight – keyboards, bass, vocals
- Gene Black – guitar

Production

- Mike Chapman – production
- George Tutko – mixing engineer
- Brian Scheuble – second engineer
- Jellybean – remixer ("Dance Mix", "Dub Version" and "Short Version")
- Michael Hutchinson – mix engineer ("Dance Mix", "Dub Version" and "Short Version")
- Tony Masciarotte – assistant engineer ("Dance Mix", "Dub Version" and "Short Version")

Other

- Paul Cox – photography

== Charts ==
Chart (1986)	Peak position
Australia (Kent Music Report)	46
Canada Top Singles (RPM)	74
Sweden (Sverigetopplistan)	8
US Billboard Hot 100	35
US Hot Dance/Disco Club Play (Billboard)	14
US Cash Box Top 100 Singles	27
West Germany (GfK)	33
