= Scandal (EP) =

EP by Scandal
- Released: 1982
- Studio: Mediasound, New York City
- Genre: Rock, pop rock
- Length: 18:53
- Label: Columbia
- Producer: Vini Poncia, Rick Chertoff

Scandal chronology
Scandal (1982)	Warrior (1984)

Singles from Scandal
- 1. "Goodbye to You" Released: September 1982; 2. "Love's Got a Line on You" Released: March 1983; 3. "Win Some, Lose Some" Released: June 1983

Professional ratings
Review scores
Source	Rating
AllMusic	3/5 stars

Scandal is the debut EP by American rock band Scandal, released in 1982 by Columbia Records. Although the EP was never released on CD, all five of the EP's songs along with the "Goodbye to You" B-side "All My Life" are found on the VH1 Scandal compilation album We Are the '80s (2006). An alternate photo from the same photoshoot of the EP was used for the VH1 compilation cover as well as Playlist: The Very Best of Scandal (2008), with the track listing for Playlist being identical to We Are the '80s. All five of the EP's songs can also be found on the remastered and expanded 2014 Rock Candy Records version of Scandal's 1984 album Warrior.

The song "Win Some, Lose Some" was written in 1979 and first recorded by Bryan Adams on his 1980 self-titled debut album.

== Track listing ==
Side one
No.	Title	Writer(s)	Length
1.	"Goodbye to You"	Zack Smith	3:46
2.	"Love's Got a Line on You"	Smith, Kathe Green	3:24
3.	"Win Some, Lose Some"	Bryan Adams, Jim Vallance, Eric Kagna, Paul Dean	3:47

Side two
No.	Title	Writer(s)	Length
4.	"She Can't Say No"	Smith, Patty Smyth	4:21
5.	"Another Bad Love"	Smith, Smyth	3:35

== Personnel ==
- Patty Smyth - vocals
- Zack Smith - guitar, background vocals
- Keith Mack - guitar, background vocals
- Ray Gomez - guitar, background vocals
- Ivan Elias - bass guitar
- Frankie LaRocka - drums
- Benjy King - keyboards, background vocals
- Paul Shaffer - keyboards
- Liz Smyth - background vocals
- Rahni Kugel - background vocals

== Production ==
- Produced by Vini Poncia (tracks 1, 2, 4, and 5) and Vini Poncia and Rick Chertoff (track 3)
- Associate producer, engineer: Bob Schaper
- Additional engineering: Harry Spiridakis, Michael Christopher, Nicky Kalliongis

== Certifications ==
Region	Certification	Certified units/sales
United States (RIAA)	Gold	500,000^{^}
^{^} Shipments figures based on certification alone.
