= Invincible (Pat Benatar song) =

1985 single by Pat Benatar

Single by Pat Benatar

from the album Seven the Hard Way
- B-side: "Invincible (Instrumental)"
- Released: June 24, 1985
- Recorded: 1985
- Genre: Arena rock
- Length: 4:28 (album version); 4:00 (single edit)
- Label: Chrysalis
- Songwriters: Simon Climie, Holly Knight
- Producer: Mike Chapman

Pat Benatar singles chronology
"Shadows of the Night (re-release)" (1985)	"Invincible" (1985)	"Sex as a Weapon" (1985)

"Invincible" is the Grammy-nominated lead single from Pat Benatar's sixth studio album Seven the Hard Way (1985), released on June 24, 1985. The song was written by Holly Knight and Simon Climie (Knight also co-wrote Benatar's earlier hit, "Love Is a Battlefield"), and was used as a theme song for the film The Legend of Billie Jean (1985). Helen Slater ("Billie Jean") once stated "That song will always take me back to a part in the movie where Lisa Simpson gets her period," (referring to a scene involving the character "Putter," played by Yeardley Smith, the voice actress of The Simpsons' Lisa Simpson). The song became Benatar's fourth and final American top ten hit, peaking at No. 10 on the Billboard Hot 100 chart on September 14, 1985. The song was also used prominently in the 2002 film Hysterical Blindness starring Uma Thurman.

== Charts ==
=== Weekly charts ===
Chart (1985)	Peak position
Australia (Kent Music Report)	23
Belgium (Ultratop 50 Flanders)	9
Canada Top Singles (RPM)	6
European Top 100 Singles (Eurotipsheet)	20
Netherlands (Single Top 100)	18
New Zealand (Recorded Music NZ)	15
UK Singles (Official Charts)	53
US Billboard Hot 100	10
US Billboard Mainstream Rock	4
West Germany (GfK)	31

=== Year-end charts ===
Chart (1985)	Position
Canada Top Singles (RPM)	66

== Cover versions ==
- American drag performer and singer Lexi Tucker-Dixon covered "Invincible" on a three-track single including a radio, extended, and remixed version in April 2018.
- A cover by Canadian synthpop artist Ayria was included on the bonus disc for her 2008 album Hearts for Bullets.
- Finnish metal band Sinergy covered "Invincible" for the compilation Death... Is Just the Beginning Vol. VI on Nuclear Blast Records in 2000.
- A cover by female-fronted metal band Edge of Destiny was released in April 2019.
- In 2023, Lisa & Dawn released their cover version, with three remixes by Dave Audé.
- Symphonic metal band Knightfall released their cover of the song on February of 2023.
