= Reach Out (Olympic theme song) =

Single by Giorgio Moroder featuring Paul Engemann

from the album The Official Music Of The XXIIIrd Olympiad Los Angeles 1984
- B-side: "Reach Out (instrumental)"
- Released: August 25, 1984
- Recorded: 1984
- Length: 3:43
- Label: Hansa Records
- Songwriters: Giorgio Moroder, Richie Zito, Paul Engemann
- Producer: Giorgio Moroder

Giorgio Moroder singles chronology
"Lady Lady Lady" (1983)	"Reach Out" (1984)	"Together in Electric Dreams" (1984)

Paul Engemann singles chronology
"American Dream" (1984)	"Reach Out" (1984)	"Shannon's Eyes" (1984)

"Reach Out" is a 1984 song by Giorgio Moroder, which was the designated theme for the track events at the 1984 Summer Olympics held in Los Angeles, United States and sung by Paul Engemann. It was later included on Moroder's 1985 album Innovisions.

== Background ==
For the 1984 Summer Olympic Games, musical themes were commissioned for many of the sports. In recognition of Los Angeles' long association with the motion picture industry, most of the pieces were written by established film soundtrack composers, including Bill Conti, Philip Glass, Bob James, Quincy Jones, Giorgio Moroder and John Williams. Moroder was commissioned to provide the Track theme, and wrote "Reach Out" with two of his regular collaborators, singer Paul Engemann and guitarist Richie Zito.

The song is an encouragement for the athletes to win.

== Music video ==
The music video does not contain any treatment and is made up of cut scenes with athletes. In the scenes the athletes swim, run a marathon and long jump and in between it, a medal is shown.

== Track listing ==
7" single

1. "Reach Out" — 3:43
2. "Reach Out" (Instrumental) — 2:51

12" single

1. "Reach Out" (Extended) — 5:39
2. "Reach Out" (Extended Instrumental) — 4:53

== Charts ==
Chart (1984)	Peak position
Netherlands (Single Top 100)	47
West Germany (GfK)	1
Switzerland (Schweizer Hitparade)	2
US Billboard Hot 100	81
