= Anchorman 2: The Legend Continues =

2013 film by Adam McKay

- Theatrical release poster
- Directed by: Adam McKay
- Written by: Will Ferrell; Adam McKay
- Produced by: Judd Apatow; Will Ferrell; Adam McKay
- Starring: Will Ferrell; Steve Carell; Paul Rudd; David Koechner; Christina Applegate
- Cinematography: Oliver Wood
- Edited by: Brent White; Melissa Bretherton
- Music by: John Nau; Andrew Feltenstein
- Production companies: Apatow Productions; Gary Sanchez Productions
- Distributed by: Paramount Pictures
- Release dates: November 24, 2013 (Australia); December 18, 2013 (United States)
- Running time: 118 minutes
- Country: United States
- Language: English
- Budget: $50 million
- Box office: $173.6 million

Anchorman 2: The Legend Continues is a 2013 American comedy film and the sequel to the 2004 film Anchorman: The Legend of Ron Burgundy. As with the original film, it is directed by Adam McKay, produced by Judd Apatow, written by McKay and Will Ferrell, with Ferrell, Steve Carell, Paul Rudd, David Koechner, Christina Applegate, and Fred Willard all reprising their roles from the first film.

Development for the film began as early as 2008, but Paramount Pictures turned down the proposed sequel. However, in March 2012, Ferrell officially announced the film was in production and filming began in March 2013. Unlike the first film, the film is distributed by Paramount Pictures instead of DreamWorks Pictures. Anchorman 2: The Legend Continues was released on December 18, 2013. It received generally positive reviews and grossed $173.6 million worldwide on a $50 million budget.

== Plot ==
In 1979, Ron Burgundy and Veronica Corningstone are husband-and-wife co-anchors for a prestigious news network in New York City. Mack Tannen, the most famous nightly news anchor in New York, is retiring. He promotes Veronica, making her the first female nightly news anchor in television history, and fires Ron due to his continuously sloppy performance on air. Ron grows jealous of Veronica's success and storms out of the house, leaving her and their 6-year-old son Walter.

Six months later, Ron is back in San Diego, barely able to hold a job due to depression. After being fired from SeaWorld and botching a suicide attempt, Ron accepts a job offered to him by Freddie Shapp with GNN, the world's first 24-hour news network. Along with his dog Baxter, he reassembles his news team of Champ Kind, Brian Fantana, and Brick Tamland. They are assigned the unpopular late-night timeslot and make a bet with obnoxious primetime anchorman Jack Lime that they will beat his ratings. Meanwhile, Ron finds that Veronica is dating psychologist Gary.

As GNN launches, Ron decides to broadcast what the people want to hear, rather than what they need to hear. He and his team devise a sensationalist and patriotic newscast. Their new approach is a hit, beating Jack in ratings massively, and the other news networks scramble to emulate them. Under the terms of the bet, Jack legally changes his name to Jack Lame. Ron and his team are promoted to primetime, where they enjoy fame and fortune. Ron's success excites GNN's manager, Linda Jackson, and they begin dating. Brick meets a similarly eccentric GNN office worker, Chani, and falls in love. Ron lets his newfound fame get to his head and neglects his parental obligations to Walter, angering Veronica. He also alienates Brian, Champ, and Brick, claiming he is tired of carrying them, and spiking Brian’s story about an airline run by GNN's owner.

During a party celebrating GNN's success, Jack causes Ron to slip and suffer a head injury, resulting in him becoming blind. Unable to read the news, Ron isolates himself in a lighthouse, unable to adjust to his loss of vision. Veronica arrives with Walter for a visit, announcing that she has dumped Gary and quit her job because Ron’s GNN antics ruined everything she loved about the news. Ron bonds with his family, gradually adjusting to his disability. Ron and Walter rehabilitate a small shark, naming him Doby before setting him free.

Ron discovers that Veronica was concealing messages from his eye doctor regarding an experimental procedure, since she thought his blindness has been significant in the family bonding. He leaves angrily, gets his vision restored, and returns to GNN. Back in New York, Veronica pleads with Ron to attend Walter's piano recital. An exclusive news story comes in, requiring Ron to cover it. However, on live TV, Ron instead says that news should inform, not entertain, delivers a two-sentence summary of Brian’s airline story, and leaves for Walter's recital. He is intercepted by an angered Jack and his team and several other news teams, all of whom want to kill him due to his fame. Champ, Brian, and Brick arrive to defend him and a massive battle ensues. Ron’s old arch-rival Wes Mantooth arrives and saves him from Jack’s news crew. Brick accidentally sets off an explosion, killing everyone, except himself, Ron, Champ and Brian. Ron reaches Walter's recital in time, and reconciles with Veronica and Walter.

While attending Brick and Chani's wedding on the beach, Ron spots Doby in the water. He greets him, only to be attacked. Baxter rescues him, and the two swim back on the beach.

== Cast ==
- Will Ferrell as Ron Burgundy
- Christina Applegate as Veronica Corningstone-Burgundy
- James Marsden as Jack Lime
- David Koechner as Champ Kind
- Paul Rudd as Brian Fantana
- Steve Carell as Brick Tamland
- Kristen Wiig as Chani Lastnamé
- Judah Nelson as Walter Burgundy
- Dylan Baker as Freddie Shapp
- Meagan Good as Linda Jackson
- Fred Willard as Ed Harken
- Josh Lawson as Kench Allenby
- Chris Parnell as Garth Holliday
- Greg Kinnear as Gary Bragger
- Wilbur Fitzgerald as Dr. Milton Brangley
- Harrison Ford as Mack Tannen
- June Diane Raphael as Chani's Boss
- Eliza Coupe as SeaWorld Trainer
- Brian F. Durkin as Trevor, the manager of SeaWorld
- Paula Pell as Crowd Member at Ice Rink
- Drake as Soul Brother
- Sacha Baron Cohen as BBC News Anchor
- Marion Cotillard as French Canadian TV News Anchor
- Will Smith as Jeff Bullington, ESPN anchor
- Kirsten Dunst as El Trousias Maiden of the Clouds
- Jim Carrey as Scott Riles (uncredited)
- Liam Neeson as History Network Host (uncredited)
- John C. Reilly as the Ghost of Stonewall Jackson (uncredited)
- Tina Fey as Jill Janson (uncredited)
- Amy Poehler as Wendy Van Peele (uncredited)
- Kanye West as Wesley Jackson (uncredited), MTV host
- Vince Vaughn as Wes Mantooth (uncredited)
- Bill Kurtis as The Narrator

== Production ==
=== Development ===
This is the first film in the series to be released by Paramount Pictures, which acquired the DreamWorks back catalog in 2006 (and owned the studio itself until 2008), including ownership of the first movie and other films from DreamWorks that were made before the Paramount merger.

In May 2008, Adam McKay said that he and Will Ferrell had talked about wanting to do an Anchorman sequel, saying: "I'm looking to do another movie, I might do this other movie called Channel 3 Billion which is kind of this science fiction/Brazil-type comedy. Then after that, Will and I are like, 'let's do Anchorman 2'... so you're talking like 2 years maybe we'll do it. But we're going to do it, for sure." On July 23, 2008, McKay announced that he and Ferrell had begun work on the sequel. Carell and Rudd, both of whom had become major stars since Anchorman was released, agreed to take pay cuts for the movie, as did Ferrell himself. On April 29, 2010, McKay announced that Paramount Pictures had turned down a proposal for the sequel, despite the proposed pay cuts, saying: "So bummed. Paramount basically passed on Anchorman 2. Even after we cut our budget down. We tried."

In a May 2010 interview, Ferrell spoke about Paramount passing on the film, saying: "Well, you know, yeah, it's a little peculiar. On the one hand, [we were] being begged to do a sequel for such a long time, and then we finally came up with a concept that we liked, we talked to all the guys, and everyone was up for it. And then to get the reaction we got, yeah, it's slightly puzzling to us. But you know what? It's also their money. They get to do or not do whatever they want. So we’ll see. We’re still going back and forth. Maybe there is a solution. Or, I know in talking to Adam, if it never happens, then it never happens. And that's fine, too. So we’ll just see." A year later, in April 2011, Ferrell publicly stated that Paramount, which owns the rights to Anchorman, had decided against the idea of a sequel, stating "We've run the numbers and it's not a good fit." In March 2012, Paramount changed their minds and agreed to make a sequel; on March 28, 2012, Ferrell officially announced the film on Conan, in character as Ron Burgundy. In an interview in April 2012, McKay said that the script was a work in progress, and that the story might include a custody battle and bowling. In a May 2012 interview, he was quoted as saying that nothing was set.

In May 2012, Will Ferrell confirmed that script writing had begun and that filming would begin around February 2013. By June 2012, parts of the story had solidified, including a move of the location from San Diego to New York, and a focus on the onset of the cable news era in the 1980s.

=== Casting ===
In August 2012, Vince Vaughn confirmed that his character, Wes Mantooth, would appear in the film, and hinted at the possible appearance of Wes Mantooth's mother, Dorothy, who was mentioned in the first film. He expressed interest in Angela Lansbury playing the role. On December 19, 2012, it was announced that the film would be released on December 20, 2013. McKay confirmed in February 2013 that actress Kristen Wiig had joined the cast.

=== Filming ===
Filming began in March 2013. On March 4, 2013, actor Harrison Ford was spotted on set with Will Ferrell. Some filming took place on St. Simons Island, Georgia starting on April 22, 2013, through May 8, 2013. Crews built a mock lighthouse and filmed a shark scene. Filming took place in Atlanta, substituting for New York City. Filming was scheduled for San Diego in the end of May 2013 (May 24 at Sea World San Diego). There was a casting call in San Diego on May 11, 2013. Some shots were made at Liberty State Park in Jersey City, New Jersey in May 2013.

== Soundtrack ==
Anchorman 2: The Legend Continues: Music from the Motion Picture

Soundtrack album by Various Artists
- Released: December 17, 2013
- Recorded: 2013
- Genre: Film soundtrack
- Length: 51:24
- Label: Republic

Anchorman 2: The Legend Continues: Music from the Motion Picture is the soundtrack of the film. It was released on December 17, 2013, by Republic Records.

| No. | Title | Writer(s) | Performer(s) | Length |
|---|---|---|---|---|
| 1. | "A Message from Ron Burgundy" | Adam McKay; John Nau; Andrew Feltenstein | Will Ferrell (as Ron Burgundy) | 0:51 |
| 2. | "Ride Like the Wind" | Christopher Cross | Christopher Cross | 3:54 |
| 3. | "Change" | John Waite | John Waite | 3:13 |
| 4. | "Ladykillers" | Adam McKay; John Nau; Andrew Feltenstein | Will Ferrell (as Ron Burgundy) & Paul Rudd (as Brian Fantana) | 0:17 |
| 5. | "Every 1's a Winner" | Errol Brown | Hot Chocolate | 4:49 |
| 6. | "Shilo" | Neil Diamond | Neil Diamond | 3:23 |
| 7. | "Life Isn't a Fairy Tale" | Adam McKay; John Nau; Andrew Feltenstein | Will Ferrell (as Ron Burgundy) & Judah Nelson (as Walter Burgundy) | 0:27 |
| 8. | "White Lines (Don't Don't Do It)" | Melvin Glover; Sylvia Robinson | Grandmaster Melle Mel | 4:28 |
| 9. | "This Is It" | Kenny Loggins; Michael McDonald | Kenny Loggins | 3:55 |
| 10. | "Another Message from Ron Burgundy" | Adam McKay; John Nau; Andrew Feltenstein | Will Ferrell (as Ron Burgundy) | 0:55 |
| 11. | "Thunder Island" | Jay Ferguson | Jay Ferguson | 4:00 |
| 12. | "Doby" | Will Ferrell; Adam McKay; John Nau; Andrew Feltenstein | Will Ferrell (as Ron Burgundy) | 2:00 |
| 13. | "Whammy Chicken" | Will Ferrell; Adam McKay; John Nau; Andrew Feltenstein | David Koechner (as Champ Kind) | 0:26 |
| 14. | "I'd Really Love to See You Tonight" | Parker McGee | England Dan & John Ford Coley | 2:37 |
| 15. | "Muskrat Love" | Willis Alan Ramsey | Captain & Tennille | 3:46 |
| 16. | "RV Reminiscing" | Adam McKay; John Nay; Andrew Feltenstein | Will Ferrell (as Ron Burgundy) & Steve Carell (as Brick Tamland) | 0:30 |
| 17. | "Lonesome Billy" | Peter Tevis; Ennio Morricone | Peter Tevis & Ennio Morricone | 1:49 |
| 18. | "Have An American Night" | Adam McKay; John Nau; Andrew Feltenstein | Will Ferrell (as Ron Burgundy) | 0:22 |
| 19. | "Hold Your Head Up" | Chris White; Rod Argent | Argent | 3:15 |
| 20. | "Ride Like the Wind" | Adam McKay; John Nau; Andrew Feltenstein; Christopher Cross | Robin Thicke & Will Ferrell (as Ron Burgundy) | 6:07 |
| 21. | "A Final Message from Ron Burgundy" | Adam McKay; John Nau; Andrew Feltenstein | Will Ferrell (as Ron Burgundy) | 0:20 |

== Release ==
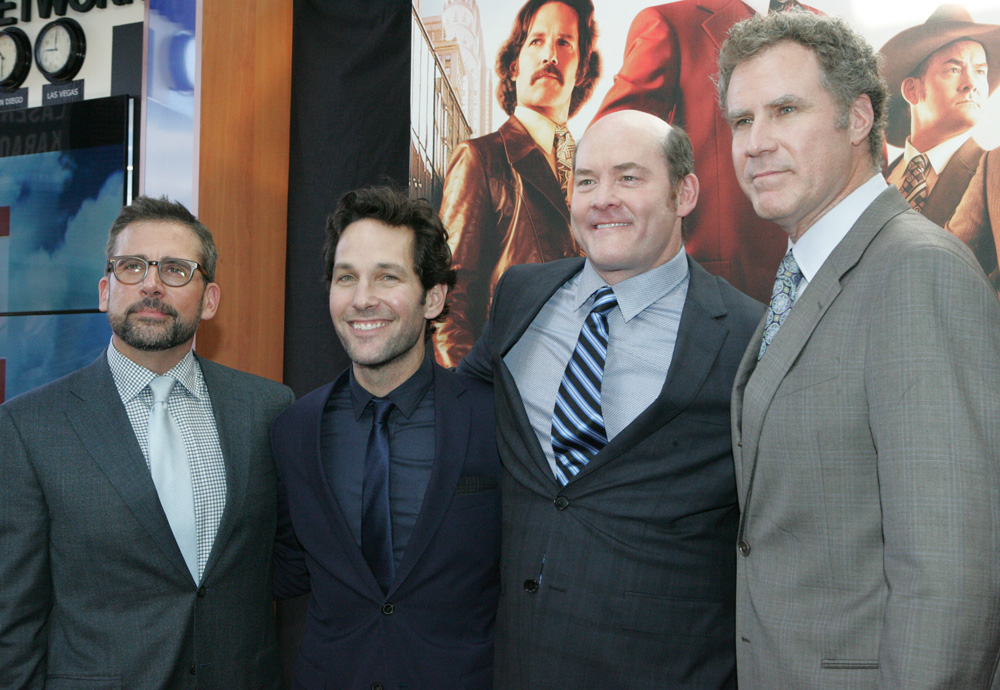
Carell (left), Rudd, Koechner, and Ferrell (right) at the film's Australian premiere in November 2013

On November 27, 2013, Paramount Pictures moved the release date up two days from December 20, 2013, to December 18, 2013. Paramount notified theater owners that Anchorman 2 would be their last film with a US release on 35mm film stock. According to the Los Angeles Times, the decision made Paramount the "first big studio" to stop releasing its major movies on film in the United States. On February 28, 2014, an R-rated version of the film titled, Anchorman 2: The Legend Continues: Super-Sized R-Rated Version (titled Anchorman 2: The Legend Continues Continued in the United Kingdom) featuring "763 new jokes" was released in theaters for one week only.

=== Marketing ===
On March 28, 2012, actor Will Ferrell officially announced the sequel dressed in character as Ron Burgundy on the late-night talk-show Conan. A teaser trailer was filmed approximately one week after Ferrell's announcement. The teaser trailer, featuring Ferrell, Rudd, Koechner, and Carell, premiered on May 16, 2012, in front of the movie The Dictator. An online version of the trailer premiered on May 21, 2012, on the website FunnyOrDie.com. A third teaser trailer was released on YouTube on May 18, 2013, with the film retitled as Anchorman 2: The Legend Continues, adding the number 2 to the title. The first full theatrical trailer was released on June 19, 2013. A second trailer was released on October 23, 2013, and was attached to Jackass Presents: Bad Grandpa.

On June 5, 2013, the Newseum in Washington, D.C., in collaboration with Paramount, opened an exhibition relating to the sequel, including props from the movies. In October 2013, Chrysler Group LLC cross-promoted the film with a series of commercials featuring Ron Burgundy and the Dodge Durango. On October 22, 2013, it was announced Ben & Jerry's would be releasing a limited edition ice cream flavor in promotion of the film called Ron Burgundy's Scotchy Scotch Scotch. On November 19, 2013, an autobiographical book called Let Me Off at the Top!: My Classy Life and Other Musings was released under the Ron Burgundy moniker. Paramount Pictures launched the Anchorman 2: Scotchy Scotch Toss game for Apple mobile devices on November 25, 2013, and the Scotchy Scotch Toss game for Android devices on December 5, 2013.

As part of a product placement deal with the film, Miller Lite decided to reintroduce their original packaging on their 16-ounce cans for the duration of the film's theatrical release, as the original logo was contemporary with the setting of the film. The retro packaging on the Miller Lite cans proved to be so popular that by September 2014 Miller Brewing Company announced that it would switch back to the packaging full-time on all Miller Lite products.

On November 25, 2013, in Sydney, Australia, Ferrell (in character as Ron Burgundy) joined the panel for a segment on the live Network Ten program The Project, reading some of the day's news and squaring off against veteran Australian news anchor Ray Martin. In a subsequent segment, Ferrell (dressed as himself) was joined by Carell, Rudd and Koechner to promote the film. On November 30, 2013, Ferrell co-anchored a newscast on Bismarck, North Dakota's CBS affiliate KXMB-TV in character as Ron Burgundy. The next day, he made a guest appearance on TSN's coverage of the Canadian Olympic Curling Trials from Winnipeg, Manitoba. On December 4, 2013, Emerson College named its School of Communication the "Ron Burgundy School of Communication" for a day. On December 4, 2013, it was announced that Ferrell was scheduled to appear on SportsCenter on December 5, 2013, in character as Ron Burgundy, but the appearance was cancelled in light of a news conference regarding sexual assault allegations against quarterback Jameis Winston.

On December 9, 2013, the European premiere was held in Ireland, at the Savoy Cinema, Dublin. The director and four main cast members were in attendance. On December 11, 2013, entertainment website IGN announced that Ron Burgundy would be a featured presenter on the site, with the site posting Burgundy-material everyday until December 18, 2013. On December 13, 2013, Ferrell, Carell, Rudd, and Koechner promoted the movie on The Late Late Show. On December 16, 2013, Ferrell appeared on the Late Show with David Letterman to promote the film. On December 19, 2013, Ferrell appeared on Jimmy Kimmel Live! and performed "Ride Like the Wind" in character as Ron Burgundy with Christopher Cross.

=== Home media ===
Anchorman 2: The Legend Continues was released on DVD and Blu-ray on April 1, 2014, by Paramount Home Media Distribution.

== Reception ==
=== Box office ===
Anchorman 2: The Legend Continues grossed $127.4 million in the United States and Canada, and $46.3 million in other countries, for a worldwide total of $173.6 million.

In North America, the film opened at number two in its first weekend, with $26.2 million, behind The Hobbit: The Desolation of Smaug. In its second weekend, the film dropped to number three in the United States, grossing an additional $19.7 million. In its third weekend, the film dropped to number six in the United States, grossing $10.6 million. In its fourth weekend, the film dropped to number 10 in the United States, grossing $5.8 million.

=== Critical response ===
Rotten Tomatoes reported that 74% of 200 critics gave Anchorman 2: The Legend Continues a positive review, with an average rating of 6.42/10. The site's critics consensus reads: "It's just as uneven and loosely structured as the first Anchorman – and while Anchorman 2: The Legend Continues may not be quite as quotable, it's nearly as funny as its predecessor." Metacritic assigned the film a weighted average score of 61 out of 100, based on 40 critics, indicating "generally favorable" reviews. Audiences surveyed by CinemaScore gave the film an average grade "B" on an A+ to F scale, the same as its predecessor.

Colin Covert of the Star Tribune gave the film three out of four stars, writing, "It may not leave the same imprint on American culture as its super-quotable predecessor. But it has moments of howling hilarity and the improvisatory spirit that gave Ron Burgundy's origin story its shaggy, ramshackle charm." Todd McCarthy of The Hollywood Reporter gave the film a positive review, writing, "It's bawdy, on-target in its take on what's become of TV news, and packed with wacky performers." Alonso Duralde of The Wrap gave the film a negative review, writing, "It's a constant barrage of joke-joke-joke, but they're all gags that take place in the moment and are immediately shoved aside for the next one. Nothing builds. There are no setups for later payoffs." Tom Huddleston of Time Out gave the film three out of five stars, writing, "Anchorman 2: The Legend Continues is not the disaster some feared it might be, but neither is it the endlessly quotable, deliciously idiotic follow-on so many of us were optimistically anticipating." Joe Neumaier of the New York Daily News gave the film two out of five stars, writing, "Anchorman 2 joins Caddyshack II, Airplane II, Breakin' 2: Electric Boogaloo and Arthur 2: On the Rocks on the list of unnecessary sequels." Stephanie Zacharek of The Village Voice gave the film a positive review, writing, "With those eyes that are a little too close together, and that confident swagger that looks as if it could disintegrate into a pratfall at any time, Ferrell makes a grand ringleader for all this nonsense."

Richard Roeper gave the film four out of five stars, calling it "one of the funniest movies of the year, and in its own loony way, it's a sharp, dead-on satire." Peter Howell of the Toronto Star gave the film two and a half stars out of four, writing, "Anchorman 2 is frequently amusing, with your personal hilarity meter likely to rate it higher if you enjoy seeing beloved characters acting even goofier than before." Joe Williams of the St. Louis Post-Dispatch gave the film two out of four stars, writing, "The movie lacks an effective comedic structure. There's nothing to stop Ferrell and co-writer/director Adam McKay from wobbling across the fine line between stupid and clever like they've had too much scotch." Rene Rodriguez of the Miami Herald gave the film one out of four stars, writing, "Fans have been clamoring for a sequel to Anchorman: The Legend of Ron Burgundy for so long, Will Ferrell (and financier Paramount Pictures) finally decided to give the people what they wanted. The moral of the story? Be careful what you wish for." Peter Hartlaub of the San Francisco Chronicle gave the film three out of four stars, writing, "It's clear that the people who created the first Anchorman wanted to hang out on a set again together. That's better than getting back together just to make money." Stephen Whitty of the Newark Star-Ledger gave the film two and a half stars out of four, writing, "Ferrell and director Adam McKay pushed things even further, raunchier and weirder."

Ian Buckwalter of NPR gave the film a positive review, saying, "Time will tell if this film is as quotable as its predecessor, but for now, Anchorman 2 coasts along quite successfully on sheer manic eccentricity." A.O. Scott of The New York Times gave the film a positive review, writing, "The sheer density of the jokes guarantees a few laughs for every taste ... and the loose, improvisational energy of the performers keeps things lively." Claudia Puig of USA Today gave the film three out of four stars, writing, "The movie cleverly spoofs the 24-hour TV news cycle, as well as sexism and racism in the workplace. Not every scene is equally funny, of course, but most of the comic antics generate laughs." Betsy Sharkey of the Los Angeles Times gave the film a negative review, writing, "While I'm glad Anchorman is back – we need a little levity in this year of heavy films – I do wish it were better." Steven Rea of The Philadelphia Inquirer gave the film three out of four stars, writing, "Burgundy and his goofball buddies are faced with dramas and dilemmas that may seem arbitrary and contrived on paper but have an urgent puissance onscreen, as Ferrell and company act their little hearts out. OK, not really." Chris Nashawaty of Entertainment Weekly gave the film a B, writing, "Comedy sequels generally follow the law of diminishing returns. If it has a 2—or, classier yet, a II—in the title, the smart money says that it won't be as funny as the original. Anchorman 2: The Legend Continues doesn't defy that axiom, but it's still plenty hilarious in a reheated sort of way." Michael Phillips of the Chicago Tribune gave the film two and a half stars out of four, writing, "Maybe if I liked the first Anchorman a little less, I'd like Anchorman 2 a little more. Still, I laughed."

Bill Goodykoontz of The Arizona Republic gave the film three out of five stars, writing, "For almost every aspect of the movie I want to criticize, there is a corresponding defense." Soren Anderson of The Seattle Times gave the film three out of four stars, writing, "It's a piñata at which Ferrell & Co. swing away wildly. They often miss their mark, but when they connect, out fall the laughs in great big bunches." Ann Hornaday of The Washington Post gave the film two and a half stars out of four, writing, "Considering the improvisatory talents – even genius – of Ferrell and his co-stars, it's no surprise that laughs abound in Anchorman 2." Peter Travers of Rolling Stone gave the film three out of four stars, writing, "When is a movie fall-down funny even when some scenes fall flat on their fat ones? When it's Anchorman 2: The Legend Continues." James Berardinelli of ReelViews gave the film two and a half stars out of four, commenting, "At two hours, Anchorman 2 overstays its welcome by at least 20 minutes, if not longer." Ty Burr of The Boston Globe gave the film a positive review, writing, "See it with a crowd, laugh yourself silly, and feel slightly ashamed in the morning." Scott Foundas of Variety gave the film a positive review, writing, "A modestly less quotable but generously funny new adventure for scotch-and-mahogany-loving 1970s newsman Ron Burgundy, here catapulted into 1980 and the dawn of the 24-hour news cycle." Rafer Guzman of Newsday gave the film a positive review, writing, "This sequel may not produce any quotable lines, but to borrow one from the original: Don't act like you're not impressed."

=== Reaction to film's portrayal of news sponsors ===
The film's suggestion that sponsors of news programs have influenced news stories is believed by many to be accurate. After attending a screening of the movie, former WCCO-TV anchorman Don Shelby stated in an op-ed that the film "hits home". Advising readers to see it, he wrote "Comedy is tragedy told with a laugh. For the old-time news people watching, 'Anchorman 2' is pure tragedy because it is essentially the truth ... go home and ask whether what passes as journalism today really is journalism".

== Possible sequel ==
On November 13, 2013, Will Ferrell spoke about the possibility of a third Anchorman film, stating: "I'm sure they would, but I don't know. We just want to see what happens with this one and we'll sit down and assess all of that. Right now, we're just enjoying this journey." On December 9, 2013, Steve Carell said, "We'll see how this one goes", and "If people like it, maybe 10 years from now we'll do a third."

Director Adam McKay spoke to Empire in February 2014 and ruled out any further Anchorman films, saying, "It's done. I think that's it. It was great to do it and it was so fun to work with those guys again, but I think that's it for Ron Burgundy.", and when asked if he would do sequels with any character he said, "No, that's the last sequel we're gonna do. There's nothing more fun to me than new characters and a new world. And now we're releasing this alt version, we're totally satisfied. No Anchorman 3."

However, on April 2, 2014, McKay stated that Anchorman 3 could still be a possibility. In an interview with Time, he stated, "I said about a month ago that we'd never do a third one, and I realized that was a little too harsh because the truth is, I really don't know. With these movies, you really don't know how they've played until about two years after they come out, when people see them on repeat viewing." He then also went on to state that "If Anchorman 2 gets that sort of second life, if three, four years from now people start asking us that question a lot and there's an idea, we would be open to that."

On March 1, 2018, Adam McKay said that the third film could be having to do with the Iraq War. McKay said, "I can give you like a little half sentence. I don’t know if you remember the first and even the second Iraq war. Maybe it was mainly the second Iraq war. They embedded journalists and that gave us kind of a whole story idea… I don’t want to say too much, but I’ll just tell you that embedded journalist, Ron Burgundy, Veronica Corningstone, the news team. That definitely gave us a big idea."

== See also ==
- List of media set in San Diego
