= Device (pop-rock band) =

American pop-rock trio (1985–1987)

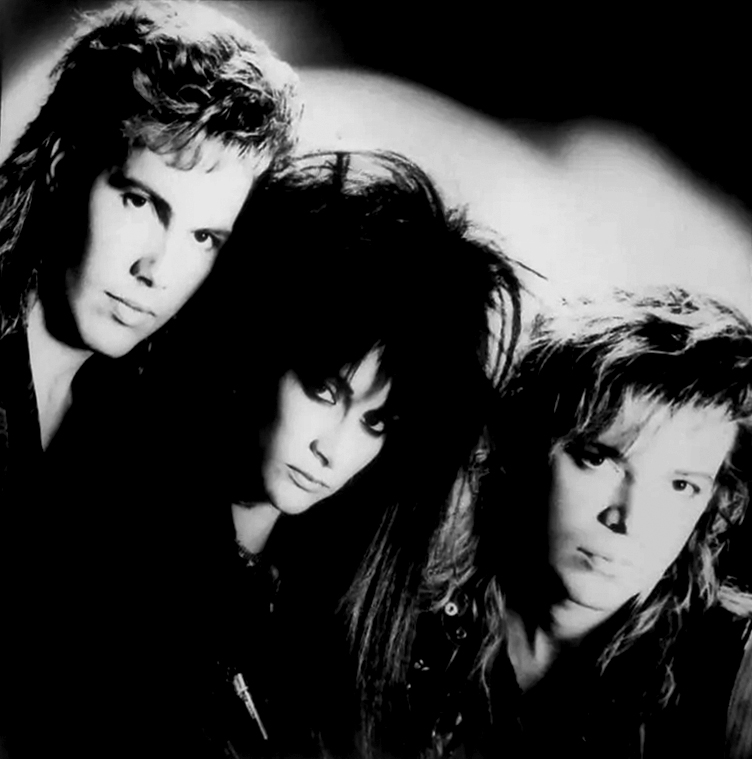
- Device in 1986

Background information
- Origin: United States
- Genres: Rock, pop, dance-rock
- Years active: 1985–1987
- Labels: Chrysalis, Renaissance
- Past members: Holly Knight; Paul Engemann; Gene Black

Device was an American pop-rock trio from the mid 1980s, formed by keyboardist, bassist and vocalist Holly Knight. It also included frontman Paul Engemann and guitarist Gene Black.

== History ==
=== 1985: Mad Max Beyond Thunderdome ===
In 1985, Holly Knight and Gene Black (who would soon form 2/3 of Device) worked with Tina Turner and Tim Cappello on the song "One of the Living" from the soundtrack to the film Mad Max Beyond Thunderdome. Holly Knight wrote and programmed the song, while also performing keyboards and backing vocals. Gene Black performed guitars and backing vocals. Mike Chapman produced the song. The saxophone solo was performed by Tim Cappello and lead vocals were performed by Tina Turner.

=== 1986: 22B3 ===
Device's only album, 22B3, was released in the spring of 1986. It produced a Top 40 single in the U.S. with "Hanging on a Heart Attack," which peaked at No. 35 on the Billboard Hot 100. The band's second single, "Who Says," peaked at No. 79. Both of these songs were promoted by music videos which garnered MTV heavy rotation for four months, and both were released as 12" singles with remix and dub versions which received club play. A third single, "Pieces on the Ground" was released as a promo 12" single, while the album peaked at No. 73 on the Billboard 200 chart. The band's fourth and final single was titled "Who's on the Line". It was a remixed version different from the album track timing in at 4:03, however it failed to chart. Mike Chapman produced the album. "Hanging on a Heart Attack" also became Device's only single to chart abroad. It reached No. 46 in the Australian Kent Music Report and No. 33 in the West German Official Charts.

=== Solo projects ===
==== Holly Knight ====
Better known as a songwriter, Knight started her career with the band Spider during the early 1980s. She wrote hit songs for Pat Benatar, Scandal, Heart, Cheap Trick, Tina Turner and many others. Turner had a hit single in 1984 with her cover of Spider's "Better Be Good to Me" from the Private Dancer album. After Device disbanded, Holly Knight released a 1988 self-titled solo album, featuring the single "Heart Don't Fail Me Now," and her own version of "Love Is a Battlefield," which she had written for Benatar, and continued writing songs for other performers.

==== Paul Engemann ====
Paul Engemann, who previously sang on soundtrack cuts produced by Giorgio Moroder, joined Animotion after Device's breakup, taking over from the original lead singer, Bill Wadhams, and sang opposite Cynthia Rhodes on Animotion's 1989 Top Ten hit "Room to Move." The song was featured in the 1988 science-fiction comedy film, My Stepmother Is an Alien. Coincidentally, Knight had recorded the original version of Animotion's biggest hit, "Obsession," as a duet with Michael Des Barres; the two co-wrote the song, which appeared on the soundtrack to the 1983 film A Night in Heaven. After Animotion's dissolution, Engemann retired from music.

==== Gene Black ====
Gene Black continued to be involved in session work, including a similarly themed 1980's band, Wild Blue, best known for the aggressive dance-rock singles "Fire with Fire" and "International Language of Dance." Black also co-wrote two Top Ten hits with Holly Knight, Heart's "Never" and Rod Stewart's "Love Touch". Black recorded extensively with Tina Turner, and later joined Joe Cocker's touring band in 1997.

=== 1996 and 2007: 22B3 Re-released ===
22B3 was re-released on CD by Renaissance Records in 1996 and again in 2007 with the same track list as the original release.

== Personnel ==
Principal members

- Paul Engemann – vocals
- Holly Knight – bass, keyboards, keytar, drum programming, vocals
- Gene Black – acoustic and electric guitars, backing vocals

Touring members

- Pat Regan – keyboards, backing vocals
- Mark Nelson – drums (also appeared in music videos)

== Discography ==
=== Studio albums ===
- 22B3 (1986)

=== Singles ===
- "Hanging on a Heart Attack" (1986)
- "Who Says" (1986)
- "Pieces on the Ground" (1986)
- "Who's on the Line" (1986)

=== Music videos ===
- "Hanging on a Heart Attack" (1986)
- "Who Says" (1986)

=== Soundtrack appearances ===
- "One of the Living" with Tina Turner and Tim Cappello (from Mad Max Beyond Thunderdome) (1985)
