= Paul Engemann =

American singer (born 1957)

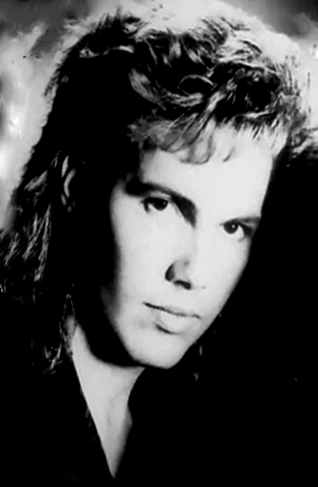
- Engemann in 1986

Background information
- Born: Paul Robert Engemann; October 15, 1957 (age 68); United States
- Occupation: Singer
- Instrument: Vocals
- Years active: 1973–1990

Paul Robert Engemann (born October 15, 1957) is an American former pop singer. He is best known for performing vocals on the 1983 Giorgio Moroder song "Scarface (Push It to the Limit)", which was featured prominently in the film Scarface.

== Career ==
With his sister Shawn (now the widow of Larry King), Paul had a small (#91) national chart record, "For Your Love", in 1975, billed as Christopher Paul, and Shawn. His younger sister Shannon Engemann (born 1964) is an actress and a model. With Giorgio Moroder, he had a number one hit in Germany (#81 in USA) with "Reach Out", that became the official song of the 33rd Olympic Games 1984 in Los Angeles. Among other releases were "American Dream" (with Giorgio Moroder 1984), "Face to Face" (1985), "Shannon's Eyes" (1985, 1986), "Brain Power" (Summer School soundtrack) (1987), "To Be Number One" (1990), and "NeverEnding Story" (2000).

Paul Engemann was the frontman of the 1980s band Device, whose only album, the futuristically titled 22B3, was released in the spring of 1986. It produced a Top 40 single with "Hanging on a Heart Attack", which peaked at number 35. Device was formed by musician-songwriter Holly Knight, with Engemann serving as lead vocalist along with Knight, and session guitarist Gene Black. Producer-songwriter Mike Chapman, who had worked with Knight in the past, produced the album.

Engemann joined the band Animotion as co-lead singer with actress Cynthia Rhodes (who replaced Astrid Plane) in 1988 (Engemann took the place of the former male lead Bill Wadhams) and had a top-ten hit with the single "Room to Move" from the Dan Aykroyd movie My Stepmother Is an Alien. Animotion dissolved in 1990.

Since retiring from the music business, Engemann opened a design business which he ran for approximately 17 years with his wife, Suzanne Barnes. Their work was featured on the cover of Architectural Digest. He later worked as a spokesperson and distributor for MXI Corporation and their Xocai dark chocolate. When MXI was sued in 2016 for their use of multi-level marketing that allegedly amounted to a pyramid scheme, Engemann was named as a defendant.

== Personal life ==
Engemann has been married to actress and former model Suzanne Barnes since 1985. They have one son, Austin.

== Discography ==
=== Device ===
- 22B3 (1986)

=== Animotion ===
- Animotion (Room to Move) (1989)

=== Solo songs ===
- "For Your Love" as Christopher Paul with Shawn Engemann (1975)
- "Scarface (Push It to the Limit)" (from Scarface soundtrack) (1983)
- "American Dream" (1984)
- "Reach Out" (from 1984 Summer Olympics soundtrack) (1984)
- "Shannon's Eyes", "Face to Face" (from Giorgio Moroder's Innovisions) (1985)
- "Brain Power" (from Summer School soundtrack) (1987)
- "To Be Number One" (from Giorgio Moroder Project's To Be Number One) (1990)
