= Zack Smith (songwriter) =

American musical artist and songwriter

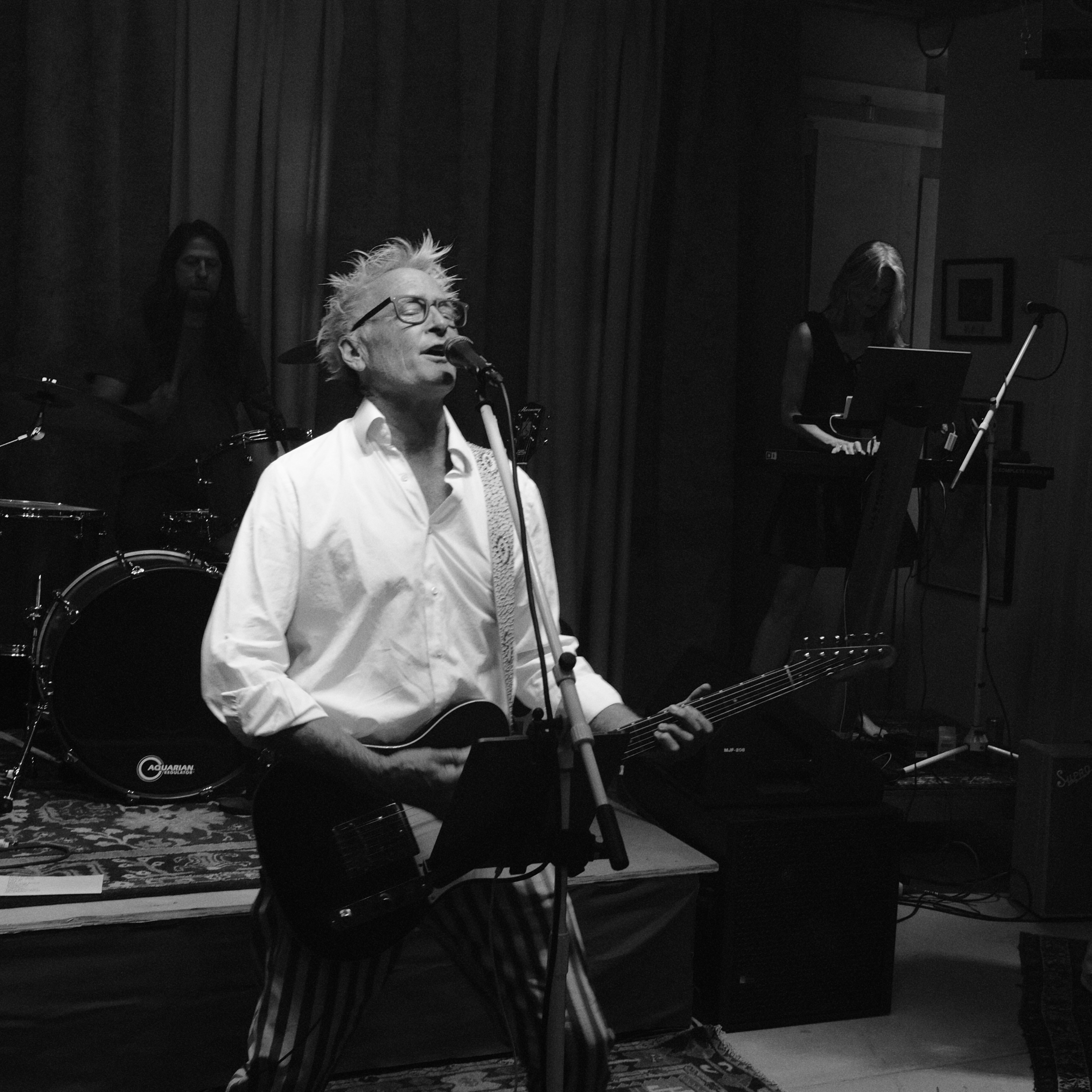
American musician, founder of the bands Scandal and The Strays

Zachary Holt Smith (born 1951) is an American musician, songwriter, technologist, and producer.

== Early life and education ==
Smith was born in 1951 and grew up in Westport, Connecticut. He attended the University of Colorado, where he met Candy and David Givens, Bobby Berge, and Otis Taylor, members of the ABC recording-artist group Zephyr. After Tommy Bolin left the band for a solo career, Smith joined and played shows as lead guitarist.

== Career ==
Smith moved to NYC after college, where he met Paul Shaffer, whose role as bandleader on Saturday Night Live had ended. Shaffer and Smith organized a cover band with other musicians, including Dee Murray and Davey Johnstone of the Elton John Band. At this time, Smith began actively writing and recording songs.

In 1981, Smith formed Scandal. The first release was a self-titled EP, which quickly became a best-seller and led to a second album, Warrior, which went gold and then platinum. Scandal was featured on Bands Reunited (MTV) and participated in a VH1 Summer Tour in 2012, along with Rick Springfield, Eddie Money, Loverboy, and The Go-Go's. Smith wrote or co-wrote most of the band's hits, including "Goodbye to You", "Love's Got a Line on You", and "Beat of a Heart".

After leaving the band, Smith began producing commercial work. He won a 1990 Clio Award for writing the original lyrics and song for the long-running "The Fabric of Our Lives" campaign of Cotton Incorporated. The first network-TV spot, "One Day", featured a vocal performance by Richie Havens. Subsequent versions of the Cotton theme featured Aaron Neville, Zooey Deschanel, Miranda Lambert, and Jasmine Sullivan.

Smith moved to San Francisco in 1997, where he began working for Apple. At Apple, he created music ecosystems used by iMovie, Clips, and Photos. He holds multiple patents for the technology he developed for Apple and made extensive contributions to Apple system sounds, including ringtones, alerts, and alarms, and is the primary architect of the Memories feature.

In 2022, Smith began a songwriting collaboration with Tamsin Smith, a poet and the founding president of Bono's (RED), initially under the name Wundercat, now known as The Strays. They released a debut album Two Sided Fortune in 2023, followed by a double LP Digging in 2025. The Strays performs throughout the San Francisco Bay Area.

== Personal life ==
Smith has four children. His eldest, Zachary Cole Smith, is the founder, frontman, and principal songwriter for the band DIIV.
