= Change (John Waite song) =

Single by John Waite

from the album Ignition
- B-side: "White Heat"
- Released: June 1982
- Recorded: 1982
- Genre: Rock
- Label: Chrysalis
- Songwriter: Holly Knight
- Producer: Neil Giraldo

John Waite singles chronology
"Change" (1982)	"Going to the Top" (1982)

Music video
- "Change" on YouTube

"Change" is a song written by Holly Knight and originally recorded by her then-band, Spider, who released the song on their 1981 second album, Between the Lines.

== John Waite recording ==
The following year, English musician John Waite, newly a solo artist after fronting The Babys, recorded a version. It was released in 1982 as his debut single from his Chrysalis Records debut album Ignition. The song reached No. 16 on the Billboard Album Rock Tracks chart. It was aided by a music video featuring Tina Gullickson, an actress and model, who has been a part of Jimmy Buffett's Coral Reefer Band since 1995.

The song (Waite's version) was also featured on the 1985 Vision Quest soundtrack. The re-launched single entered the Billboard Hot 100 and climbed to No. 54.
