= Holly Knight =

American songwriter, musician, and singer (born 1956)

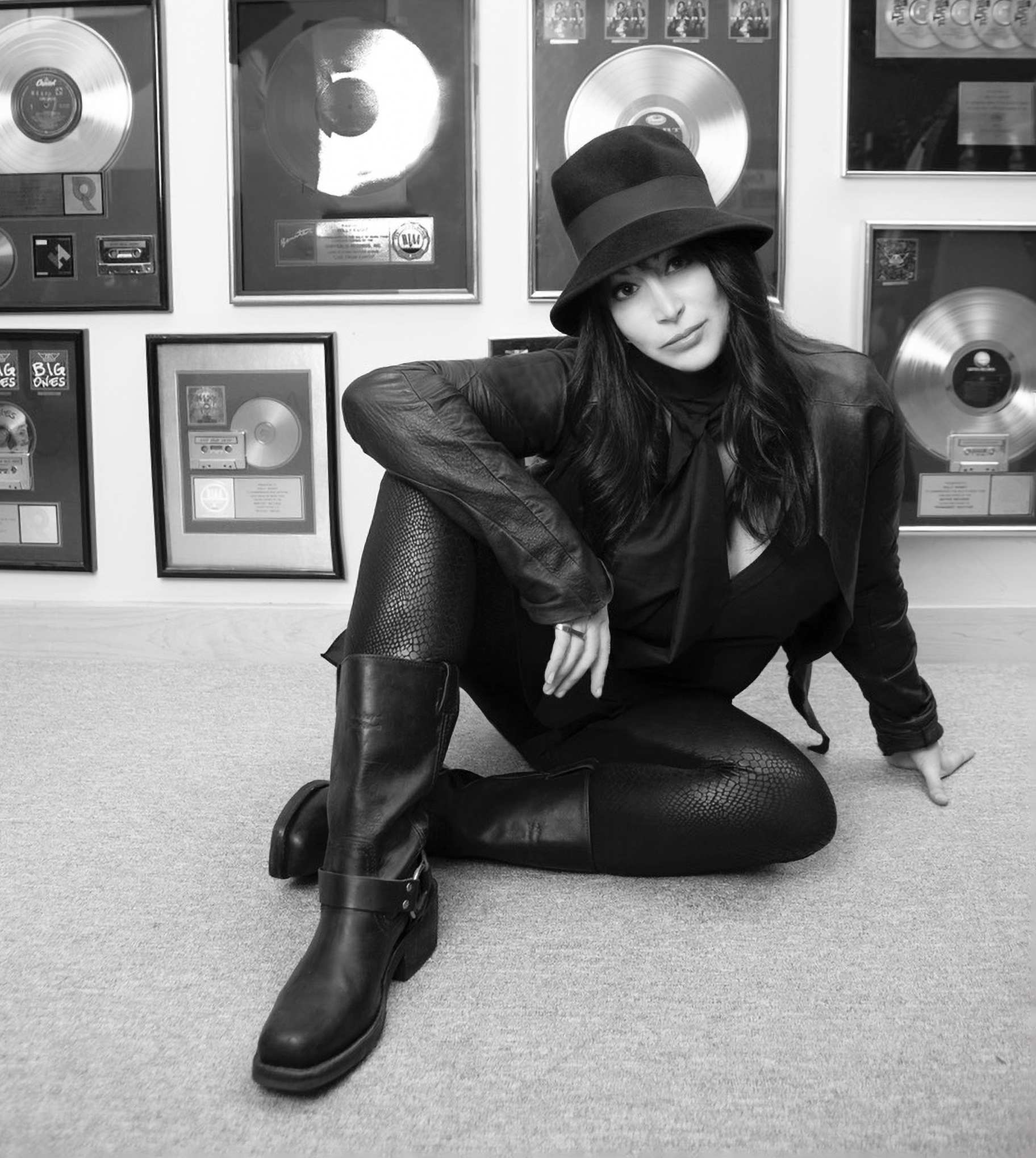
- Knight in 2013

Background information
- Born: Holly Erlanger; 1956 (age 69–70); New York City, New York, U.S.
- Genres: Pop; rock
- Occupations: Songwriter; singer; musician; producer; author
- Instruments: Keyboards; piano; programming; keytar; guitar; bass; vocals
- Years active: 1980–present
- Labels: Dreamland; RSO; Chrysalis; Columbia
- Website: hollyknight.com

Holly Knight (born 1956) is an American songwriter, musician, and singer. She was a member of the 1980s pop rock groups Spider and Device, and wrote or co-wrote several hit singles for other artists, such as "Rag Doll", "Hide Your Heart", "Obsession", "Love Is a Battlefield", "The Best", "Invincible", "Better Be Good to Me", "The Warrior", "Wrap Your Arms Around Me" and "Change".

In 2013, she was inducted into the Songwriters Hall of Fame. She has won thirteen ASCAP Awards, and has co-written hits for numerous successful recording artists, including Tina Turner and Pat Benatar who each won Grammy Awards for their recordings of her songs.

== Early life and education ==
Knight was born in New York City. She started playing classical piano at the age of four, continuing her studies for ten years at the Mannes School of Music.

== Career ==
In 1980, Knight's first big break came when she played keyboards (uncredited) on Kiss' Unmasked album. In the early 1980s, she helped form Spider (featuring Anton Fig of Late Show with David Letterman). Managed by Bill Aucoin (Kiss and Billy Idol), they signed a recording contract with Dreamland Records, an RSO-distributed label. They released two albums: Spider (self-titled; 1980) and Between the Lines (1981).

Knight was already planning to leave Spider, when Dreamland president, songwriter and record producer Mike Chapman urged her to move to Los Angeles to pursue her songwriting career. She signed a publishing deal with his company, eventually signing to EMI Publishing. Knight and Chapman worked together on the top 5 U.S. hit "Better Be Good to Me" (1984) by Tina Turner and "Love Is a Battlefield" (1983) by Pat Benatar, each of which won a Grammy Award for Best Female Rock Vocal Performance. Knight was replaced on keyboards in Spider, later renamed Shanghai for its eponymous and final album, before her former band folded in 1984.

Knight has written hits for some of the most successful artists in music, both on her own and in collaboration with others. For Pat Benatar, in addition to "Love Is a Battlefield", she wrote "Invincible". "The Best"—first recorded by Bonnie Tyler—became an international No. 1 single for Tina Turner. Knight wrote songs with Heart, Aerosmith, Rod Stewart, Bon Jovi, and many more. Tina Turner has recorded nine of her tunes, including "The Best", "Better Be Good to Me", and "In Your Wildest Dreams" (1996). Holly Knight was voted the Best Songwriter in Rolling Stone magazine's 11th annual poll, along with Phil Collins, Paul Simon, Billy Joel, and Bruce Springsteen.

In the mid-1980s, Knight had a second band called Device, that had a hit single "Hanging on a Heart Attack" from their one album 22B3 (1986). Although Spider and Device both had Top 40 hits, only Device received heavy-rotation on MTV for four consecutive months. In 1988, Holly released a self-titled solo album that featured her own rendition of "Love Is a Battlefield", as well "Heart Don't Fail Me Now", a single with background vocals by Daryl Hall.

Holly Knight's songs have been featured on film soundtracks for Weird Science (1985), Vision Quest (1985), Legend of Billie Jean (1985), Mad Max Beyond Thunderdome (1985), Legal Eagles (1986), The Secret of My Success (1987), Thelma & Louise (1991), Stuart Little 2 (2002), 13 Going on 30 (2004), What the Bleep Do We Know!? (2004), Hot Tub Time Machine (2010), Anchorman 2 (2013), Dallas Buyers Club (2013), The Other Woman (2014), Hitman's Wife's Bodyguard (2021), 80 For Brady (2023), and Cocaine Bear (2023); and hit television shows such as American Idol, The Voice, Nip/Tuck, The Singing Bee, The Oprah Winfrey Show, The Simpsons, Family Guy, 30 Rock, South Park, Glee, The Tonight Show Starring Jimmy Fallon, Necessary Roughness, the 40th anniversary of Saturday Night Live, and the finale episode of The Voice (2011), in which Cee Lo Green performed a duet of "Love Is a Battlefield" with one of the final contestants. Most recently, Knight's songs have been featured on the Netflix show GLOW ("The Warrior"- theme song), Stranger Things, Mixed-ish, The Masked Singer, and Schitt's Creek. She wrote and produced the theme song for the popular TV shows Angel (1999–2004) and Still Standing (2002–2006).

In 1988, Knight was listed in the "Best Songwriter Category/Readers Poll" of Rolling Stone along with Bruce Springsteen, Phil Collins, Paul Simon, and Billy Joel.

In the 21st century, Knight has also been active as a record producer. In 2009, she produced a jazz EP called Natural for Antonia Bennett, daughter of Tony Bennett, and in 2012, an alternative pop record of original songs for her, titled Ordinary Girl. In 2014, she produced a second full-length jazz record for Antonia Bennett of songs from the Great American Songbook called Embrace Me, on Perseverance records. She has also produced tracks for Otep, Fefe Dobson, The Donnas, the Australian band Porcelain, and 2014 Tony Award winner Lena Hall.

Knight has been mentioned in several autobiographies, including I, Tina by Tina Turner (1986), Between a Heart and a Rock Place by Pat Benatar (2010), and Kicking and Screaming by Ann and Nancy Wilson of Heart (2013), I'm with the Band by Pamela Des Barres (2005), My Love Story by Tina Turner (2018), and All I Ever Wanted by Kathy Valentine (2020).

Knight contributed her story to the 2017 book Because I Was a Girl: True Stories for Girls of All Ages, published by Henry Holt and Company.

Her song "The Best" has appeared in three episodes of the Emmy award-winning Netflix show Schitt's Creek. Season 4, Episode 1 "The Olive Branch": David lip-syncs to the original Tina Turner recording. Season 4, Episode 6 "Open Mic": Patrick performs an acoustic version of the song (arranged by actor Noah Reid). Season 6, Episode 13 (the series finale): the Jazzagals sing a cappella at David and Patrick's wedding, causing "The Best" to become a popular wedding song in the LGBTQ community.

Three of Knight's songs, "The Best", "Better Be Good to Me", and "Be Tender with Me Baby," are featured in The Tina Turner Musical, which began previews at the Aldwych Theatre, in The West End in London, on March 21, 2018, and officially opened on April 17. In November 2019, the musical made its Broadway debut at the Lunt-Fontanne Theatre in New York. Tina Turner herself attended both premieres. In March 2019, the show opened at the Stage Operettenhaus in Hamburg, and on February 9, 2020 at the Beatrix Theater in Utrecht, the Netherlands. In 2020, the musical received eleven Tony Award nominations.

"The Best" was played at the conclusion of Joe Biden's victory speech after he was declared the winner of the 2020 United States presidential election.

In November 2022, Knight released her memoir entitled, I Am The Warrior: My Crazy Life Writing the Hits and Rocking the MTV Eighties. It was offered in a hardcover edition by Permuted Press, a Kindle edition, and an Audible audio book, which she narrated. The latter contains original demos of some of her biggest hits, including, "The Best", "Love Is a Battlefield" and "The Warrior". The book was listed on both Amazon and Audible as the #1 Hot New Release in Popular Music.

In 2023, during the Super Bowl, "The Best" also appeared in a Pringles commercial

In her spare time, Knight also does fine art photography.

== Personal life ==
Knight has two grown sons.

She has been married three times, and dated Anton Fig and Paul Stanley in the 1980s.

== Discography ==
=== Studio albums ===
- Holly Knight (1988)

=== With Spider ===
- Spider (1980)
- Between the Lines (1981)

=== With Device ===
- 22B3 (1986)

=== With Kiss ===
- Unmasked (1980)

=== Soundtrack appearances ===
- "One of the Living" with Tina Turner (from Mad Max Beyond Thunderdome) (1985)
- "Invincible" with Pat Benatar (from The Legend of Billie Jean) (1985)
- "Love Is a Battlefield" with Pat Benatar (from Weird Science) (1985)
- "Change" with John Waite (from Vision Quest) (1985)
- "Love Touch" with Rod Stewart (from Legal Eagles) (1986)
- "Sometimes the Good Guys Finish First" with Pat Benatar (from The Secret of My Success) (1987)
- "I Burn for You" with Chris Max (from The Secret of My Success) (1987)
- "I Can't Untie You from Me" with Grayson Hugh (from Thelma and Louise) (1991)
- "Don't Look Back" with Grayson Hugh (from Thelma and Louise) (1991)
- "Better Be Good to Me" with Tina Turner (from Miami Vice episode "Give a Little, Take a Little") (1991)
- "Love Is a Battlefield" with Pat Benatar and Queen Latifah (from Small Soldiers) (1998)
- "Hold On to the Good Things" with Shawn Colvin (from Stuart Little 2) (2002)
- "Love Is a Battlefield" with Pat Benatar (from 13 Going on 30) (2002)
- "Obsession" with Animotion (from What the Bleep Do We Know!?) (2004)
- "Obsession" with Animotion (from Hot Tub Time Machine) (2010)
- "Change" with John Waite (from Anchorman 2) (2013)
- "Love Is a Battlefield" with Raining Jane (from The Other Woman) (2014)
- "The Warrior" with Scandal (from Just Before I Go) (2014)

Songs in theater productions

- The Tina Turner Musical; Moulin Rouge

=== Songs (credited as songwriter) ===
- Ace Frehley - "Hide Your Heart"
- Aerosmith - "Rag Doll"
- Angel (TV series) - theme music
- Animotion - "Obsession"; "I Engineer"
- Jimmy Barnes - "Between Two Fires"
- Tina Turner - "The Best"; "Better Be Good to Me"; "One of the Living"; "You Can't Stop Me Loving You"; "Be Tender with Me Baby"; "Ask Me How I Feel"; "Love Thing"; "In Your Wildest Dreams"; "Do Something"
- John Waite - "Change"
- Pat Benatar - "Love Is a Battlefield"; "Invincible"; "Sometimes the Good Guys Finish First"; "Girl"
- Patty Smyth - "The Warrior"; "Hands Tied"
- Bon Jovi - "Stick to Your Guns"
- Bonnie Tyler - "Hide Your Heart"; "The Best"; "Where Were You"
- Cheap Trick - "Space"
- Shawn Colvin - "Hold on to the Good Things"
- Darling Violetta - "My Sanctuary" (theme to TV show Angel)
- Device - "Hanging on a Heart Attack"; "Who Says"; "Didn't I Read You Right"; "Sand Stone Cobwebs and Dust"; "Who's on the Line"; "Tough and Tender"; "Pieces on the Ground"; "Fall Apart Golden Heart"; "When Love Is Good"
- Divinyls - "Pleasure and Pain"
- Fefe Dobson - "Get Over Me"
- The Donnas - "Wasted", "Here for the Party"
- Eighth Wonder - "When the Phone Stops Ringing"
- Elvira - "Here Comes the Bride (of Frankenstein)"; "Haunted House"
- Agnetha Fältskog (ABBA) - "Wrap Your Arms Around Me"
- Lita Ford - "Stiletto"
- Lou Gramm - "Just Between You and Me"
- Hall & Oates - "Soul Love"
- Lisa Hartman - "New Romance (It's a Mystery)"
- Heart - "Never"; "All Eyes"; "There's the Girl"; "Tall, Dark Handsome Stranger"; "I Love You"
- Grayson Hugh, Thelma & Louise soundtrack - "Can't Untie You from Me"; "Don't Look Back"; "Road to Freedom"
- Chaka Khan - "Baby Me"
- Kidd Video - "When the Phone Stops Ringing"
- Kids Incorporated - "Change"
- Kiss - "Hide Your Heart"; "I Pledge Allegiance to the State of Rock & Roll"; "Raise Your Glasses"
- Holly Knight - "Heart Don't Fail Me Now"; "Howling at the Moon"; "Love Is a Battlefield"; "Sexy Boy"; "Nature of the Beast" "Palace of Pleasure"; "Howling At The Moon"; "It's Only Me"; "Why Don't You Love Me Like You Used To"
- Less Than Jake - "Overrated (Everything Is)"
- Luke Evans - "Love Is a Battlefield"
- Marilyn Martin - "Turn It On"
- Noah Reid - "The Best"
- Christopher Max - "I Burn for You"
- Suzie McNeil - "Help Me Out"
- Meat Loaf - "Monstro"; "Alive"
- Leigh Nash - "Angel Tonight"
- Hawk Nelson - "Not the Same"
- Aaron Neville - "Try a Little Harder"
- Otep - "Perfectly Flawed", "Ur a Wmn Now"
- Ozzy Osbourne - "Slow Burn" (unreleased)
- Suzi Quatro - "Fear of the Unknown", "Whatever Love Is"
- Real Life - "Babies"
- Riff - "My Heart is Failing Me"
- Robin Beck - "Hide Your Heart"
- Scandal featuring Patty Smyth - "The Warrior"; "Hands Tied"
- Sheila - "Little Darlin'"
- Charlie Sexton - "Space"
- Spider - "Better Be Good to Me"; "New Romance (It's a Mystery)"; "Change"; "Everything Is Alright"; "Little Darlin"; "Go and Run"; "It Didn't Take Long"; "Can't Live This Way Anymore"
- Dusty Springfield - "Time Waits for No One"
- Paul Stanley - "It's Not Me"
- Rod Stewart - "Love Touch"
- Still Standing (TV series) - "Still Standing"
- Rachel Sweet - "Little Darlin'"
- Kim Wilde - "Turn It On"
- Zander Bleck - "Temptation"
