= Goodbye to You (Scandal song) =

Single by Scandal

from the album Scandal
- B-side: "All My Life"
- Released: September 1982
- Studio: Mediasound, New York City
- Genre: Power pop; new wave
- Length: 3:46
- Label: Columbia
- Songwriter: Zack Smith

Scandal singles chronology
"Goodbye to You" (1982)	"Love's Got a Line on You" (1983)

Music video
- "Goodbye to You" on YouTube

"Goodbye to You" is the debut single by American rock band Scandal. The song was written by band member Zack Smith, and is from their 1982 eponymous debut EP.

In 2024, the song was used in an ad for Airsupra.

== Background ==
The video shows Patty Smyth in a bright red dress singing the lyrics to various members of the band as they perform the song. Scandal keyboardist Benjy King is shown playing a rare Digital Keyboards Synergy synthesizer, which provided the main 8th note foundation of the track.

Though he is not shown in the video, the song features Max Crook from Del Shannon's band and Paul Shaffer (who at the time was bandleader and sidekick on Late Night with David Letterman) playing a solo—based on Del Shannon's "Runaway" on an Oberheim OB-Xa.

== Charts ==
=== Weekly charts ===
Chart (1982)	Peak position
US Billboard Hot 100	65
US Cash Box Top 100	60
