= Salbutamol/budesonide =

Medication

Combination of
- Albuterol: short-acting β2-agonist
- Budesonide: inhaled corticosteroid

Clinical data
- Trade names: Airsupra
- Other names: PT027, albuterol/budesonide
- AHFS/Drugs.com: Monograph
- License data: US DailyMed: Albuterol and Budesonide
- Routes of administration: Inhalation
- ATC code: R03AK15 (WHO)

Legal status
- Legal status: US: ℞-only

Identifiers
- KEGG: D12757

Albuterol/budesonide, sold under the brand name AIRSUPRA, is a fixed-dose combination medication for the treatment of bronchoconstriction and asthma. It is a combination of albuterol, a short-acting beta2-adrenergic agonist, and budesonide, an inhaled corticosteroid. It is inhaled using a pressurized metered-dose inhaler.

The most common side effects include headache, oral candidiasis, cough, and difficulty speaking.

AIRSUPRA was approved for medical use in the United States in January 2023. It is the first combination of an inhaled corticosteroid and a short-acting beta-agonist to be approved by the US Food and Drug Administration (FDA). It is the first product containing an inhaled corticosteroid to be approved by the FDA as a reliever treatment (rather than as a controller) for asthma.

== Medical uses ==
AIRSUPRA is indicated for the as-needed treatment or prevention of bronchoconstriction and to reduce the risk of asthma attacks.

== History ==
The efficacy of salbutamol/budesonide to reduce the risk of severe asthma attacks was evaluated in participants with moderate to severe asthma in MANDALA (NCT03769090), a randomized, double-blind, multicenter study.
