= Spider (American band) =

American rock band

- Also known as: Shanghai
- Origin: New York, U.S.
- Genres: Hard rock
- Years active: 1977–1984
- Labels: Dreamland, Chrysalis
- Past members: Amanda Blue Leigh; Keith Lentin; Jim Lowell; Beau Hill; Holly Knight; Anton Fig

Spider was an American rock band from New York, United States, that formed in 1977 and disbanded in 1984. They released two studio albums through Dreamland Records, a sub-label of RSO Records, in the early 1980s, and scored a few moderate hit singles in the United States. Two songs from their 1981 album Between the Lines - "Change" and "Better Be Good to Me" - were hits for John Waite and Tina Turner, respectively. In 1982 they changed the band's name to Shanghai and released their third and final album.

Holly Knight left the band before the third album and Beau Hill replaced her on keyboards. Knight went on to become a successful songwriter for many artists and was inducted into the Songwriters Hall of Fame in 2013 - and she also formed the band Device. Hill had already been a record producer. Anton Fig and Jim Lowell toured with Link Wray and appeared on his live album Live at the Paradiso, recorded in 1979. Fig became a session drummer for several different bands throughout the rest of the 1980s and later went on to play with Paul Shaffer in The World’s Most Dangerous Band (later the CBS Orchestra) on Late Night with David Letterman.

== Band members ==
- Amanda Blue Leigh – vocals
- Keith Lentin – guitar
- Jim Lowell – bass guitar
- Holly Knight – keyboards
- Beau Hill – keyboards (1982–1984)
- Anton Fig – drums

== Discography ==
=== Studio albums ===
- Spider (Dreamland Records, 1980) U.S. No. 130
- Between the Lines (Dreamland, 1981) U.S. No. 185
- Shanghai (Chrysalis, 1982)

=== Singles ===
- "New Romance (It's a Mystery)" (1980) U.S. No. 39, AUS No. 56
- "Everything Is Alright" (1980) U.S. No. 86
- "Little Darlin'" (1980)
- "It Didn't Take Long" (1981) U.S. No. 43
- "Better Be Good to Me" (1981)

== Other sources ==
- Joel Whitburn, The Billboard Book of Top 40 Hits. 7th edn, 2000
- Spider at Allmusic
