= Mike Chapman =

Australian record producer and songwriter (born 1947)

Mike Chapman OAM
- Born: Michael Donald Chapman; 13 April 1947 (age 79); Nambour, Queensland, Australia
- Genres: Pop; glam rock
- Occupations: Songwriter; record producer
- Years active: 1970s–present

Michael Donald Chapman OAM (born 13 April 1947) is an Australian record producer and songwriter who was a major force in the British pop music industry in the 1970s. He created a string of hit singles for artists including The Sweet, Suzi Quatro, Smokie, Mud and Racey with business partner Nicky Chinn, creating a sound that became identified with the "Chinnichap" brand. He later produced breakthrough albums for Blondie and the Knack. Chapman received a Medal of the Order of Australia (OAM) in the 2014 Australia Day Honours.

== Early career ==
Chapman was born in Queensland, Australia, and was educated at the Anglican Church Grammar School in Brisbane. He emigrated to Britain and in 1968 joined the group Tangerine Peel. They released an album in 1969 and had several near-hit singles between 1967 and 1970. In 1970 he met Nicky Chinn while working as a waiter at a London nightclub, Tramp. The pair struck up a song-writing partnership, and began working with producer Mickie Most on his RAK Records label, which quickly became home to a roster of artists including Suzi Quatro, Smokie, and Mud.

Chinn recalled:

We decided to meet someone who was making hit records instead of going round to publishers' offices and playing our songs to people who didn't know what they were talking about. I got hold of Mickie's home number because I thought a secretary might block the call at the office. His wife, Chris, put him on and I said, 'We write hits and it would be great to meet up.' Mickie said, 'Okay, 11.30 tomorrow morning.' Mike played him some songs, all of which he didn't like, until the last one which was "Tom Tom Turnaround". He gave it to New World and it was a Top 5 record.

== Chapman and Chinn ==
From 1970 until 1978 Chapman and Chinn scored a run of hit singles. In 1973 and 1974 alone the pair had 19 hits in the Top 40 of the UK Singles Chart, including five number ones. The pair's dominance of the charts in Britain, Germany, Scandinavia, Australia and New Zealand outlasted the decline of glam rock, and waned in line with the fading fortunes of Smokie and Suzi Quatro.

Chapman exerted a tight grip on the output of the bands whose works he produced, determining the content of all albums. Some resented the level of control: The Sweet, whose interests lay in heavy rock, chafed at the teenybopper material Chapman gave them to perform, finally balking at some songs which did not fit in with their new direction and seeking success on their own; Chapman offered "Some Girls" to Blondie but the song was eventually given to Racey instead. Deborah Harry has referred to Chapman as a dictator, and for the photo shoot for one magazine interview he insisted on dressing up as US wartime General George S. Patton, Jr.

Chapman continued to write hits, including Exile's "Kiss You All Over" (1978) and Toni Basil's "Mickey" (1982, a reworked version of "Kitty", a song they had written for Racey in 1980).

Together with Chinn he formed the Dreamland record label in 1979, but it lasted only two years. In 2014 Chinn and Chapman got together to work on the musical Blockbuster, which was based around their songs. This was the first time they had spoken to each other in 25 years.

== Solo production work ==
=== Blondie ===
Chinn's involvement in production was always minimal and Chapman continued to produce alone after moving to the U.S. in 1975. He produced Nick Gilder's City Nights album in 1978 (which yielded the "Hot Child in the City" hit) with Peter Coleman, his long-time recording engineer and in May the same year began working with Blondie to record their third album in New York. Chapman was a fan of their music but was dissatisfied with the production of their albums. He bluntly told the band that he would make them a hit record and he was right: Parallel Lines turned the band into an international success and became arguably the pinnacle of his own career.

The Parallel Lines session lasted three months. Singer Deborah Harry was struck by the intensity of Chapman's working methods. She said:

It was diametrically opposite from working with (former producer) Richard Gottehrer. He's very laid back and Mike is a real hot chili pepper and very energetic and enthusiastic. Mike would strive for the technically impeccable take so we would do take after take whereas Richard always went for the inspired take.

Keyboardist Jimmy Destri recalled:

He was a very good producer, a very good producer. He wasn't very technical, but he was very organic and he was a very good mixer on his own too. I mean he knew the console like nobody else I've ever seen. He would say things like 'Jimmy, if you shut out the lights, I'll be able to EQ by ear' without even looking at the console! He taught me a lot about making records, that's what Mike did. And he was another member of the band at that point, and he was just like in there with us. And from Parallel Lines and onwards, Mike was integral, he was really integral as we couldn't go in the studio without him. As far as the recording process of those albums, we all learned a lot from Mike.

Employing the same skills he had applied to records by Smokie and Gilder, Chapman produced a more polished guitar and keyboard sound than the band had ever achieved, topped with layered vocals. The focal point of the album and the breakthrough single, was "Heart of Glass". The source of its driving disco beat is a matter of contention: Chapman said he had created the sound after the band had presented it as a slower, reggae-style song; band members insist it had always been known as their disco song and that they had created the sound by combining the influences of Kraftwerk and Saturday Night Fever.

Chapman produced three more Blondie albums – Eat to the Beat, Autoamerican and The Hunter – and most of Def, Dumb and Blonde, a Deborah Harry solo album. In an article in Creem magazine Chris Stein marvelled at Chapman's attention to detail, noting that the percussion for "The Tide Is High" also included "eight tracks of drum sticks tapping on a piano bench." He said:

Chapman hunches over the console into the wee hours. People are pressed flat against the back wall by his playback volume. Gallons of Jose Cuervo Gold are consumed... Finally, the basic tracks wind down, and we move a block down the Strip to Studio B. The move marks the Home Stretch; the vocals, overdubs and finally the orchestral horns and what have you. Here is Mike Chapman's little Magic Room. The control room is filled with a gigantic blue console that's hooked up to computers, satellites and atomic submarines off the coast of Maine. Here the songs get the 'chrome' put on.

=== The Knack ===
Within months of Parallel Lines' release, Chapman was working with another band for which he would achieve a career high-water mark: power pop outfit the Knack. The band's website notes that in November 1978, 13 record companies were engaged in a fierce bidding war for the band's services, with Capitol Records finally signing the band. Producers clamoured to offer their services and even Phil Spector was anxious to participate.

The website says:

Chapman read an article in the LA Times which identified the producers the band most wanted to work with. His name wasn't on the list. Sensing a blockbuster, Chapman convinced the band to allow him to produce and signed on. With a team now firmly in place, the Knack and Chapman entered the studio, eager to capture the energy of their live performances. While artists such as the Eagles and Fleetwood Mac were spending more than a year and a million dollars to produce an album, Get The Knack was recorded in just 11 days for a miserly $17,000. The Knack performed the songs "live" with minimal overdubs. Chapman basically hit the record button and let the band play.

The album and the single "My Sharona" hit No. 1 in the US and sold millions around the world. Its follow-up ...But the Little Girls Understand was less successful. Featuring a producer credit as "Commander Chapman" and liner notes in which Chapman boasted, "This record is very dear to me and my bank manager", it prompted a bitter falling-out between band and producer. Chapman claimed the album cost him his reputation. In the book Off the Record, Chapman said he and the band made the second album under the heady impression that they could do no wrong. He accused singer and guitarist Doug Fieger of being deluded with notions he was Jim Morrison or Buddy Holly ... "there was nothing he could do that wouldn't work". Fieger, in a 1994 interview, responded: "Mike Chapman is one of the bigger assholes that you'll ever meet on the planet. Unfortunately, Mike Chapman was not in any psychological or physical shape to produce that second album when we really needed a producer."

== Writing technique ==
Chinn and Chapman delivered their songs rapidly, often conceiving and completing them overnight. They said they created their songs by first thinking of a title, around which they then wrote the lyrics.

In a 2002 interview with The Guardian, Chapman reflected that writing hit songs was an art to which many aspired but few achieved: "It's always a gamble. We'd written something like eight top 10 hits for Sweet when we heard that they'd entered the studio to record their own songs. After that, it was over for them. The bottom line is this – writing songs might be easy to do, but it's incredibly hard to do well."

== Through the 1980s and into the 1990s ==
Chapman remained in demand through the 1980s and 1990s as a songwriter and producer. His compositions included Tina Turner's "The Best" (originally recorded by Bonnie Tyler), "Better Be Good to Me" and "In Your Wildest Dreams" and Pat Benatar's "Love Is a Battlefield" (all co-written with Holly Knight), Nat Allison's "Anyone for Tennis" (which was used in advertisements for tennis coverage on the Seven Network during the 2009–10 season) and Scandal's "Hands Tied", another Chapman/Knight collaboration which was No. 41 in the US.

Chapman also produced albums for Altered Images, Australian Crawl, Agnetha Fältskog, Scandal, Divinyls, Rod Stewart, Lita Ford, Pat Benatar, Baby Animals, Tami Show, Nervus Rex, Material Issue and Bow Wow Wow.

== Later work ==
In 1998, Chapman co-wrote two songs for Ace of Base, "Always Have, Always Will" and "Whenever You're Near Me".

Between 1999 and 2001, Chapman wrote and produced Babyphetamine, an album by the teenager Erin Evermore for the Tigerstar label, owned by the former Chrysalis Records head, Terry Ellis.

In 2006, he wrote "Back to the Drive", the title track of the Suzi Quatro Back to the Drive album. In the liner notes Quatro thanked Chapman "for providing the title track and overseeing the entire project".

In 2007, Chapman began working with the Los Angeles rock band, the Automatic Music Explosion. The band's lead singer, Matt Starr, flew to Chapman's East Coast home in an attempt to meet the producer. The bold move worked, with Chapman flying to Los Angeles a month later to see the band perform live and ultimately agreeing to produce their first album.

In January 2008, Chapman produced the single "Spin It" with the Neighborhood Bullys. In May 2008, Chapman began mixing songs from Your Doll, for Lisa Douglass. In September 2008, Chapman met Haim, and started producing an album with the band. In November 2008, Chapman also started writing with, and producing a solo album for Sarah Jeanette, singer with the Mulhollands.

In 2016, Mike Chapman Publishing signed a deal with Jeremy Lascelles' newly launched Blue Raincoat Songs.

== Hit singles ==
Songs produced, or written and produced, by Chapman/Chinn or Chapman as sole producer which appeared on the UK Singles Chart:

- 1971:

New World: "Tom Tom Turnaround", "Kara Kara"
The Sweet: "Funny Funny", "Co-Co", "Alexander Graham Bell"

- 1972:

The Sweet: "Poppa Joe", "Little Willy", "Wig-Wam Bam"
New World: "Sister Jane"

- 1973:

Mud: "Crazy", "Hypnosis", "Dyna-Mite"
Suzi Quatro: "Can the Can", "48 Crash", "Daytona Demon"
The Sweet: "Block Buster!", "Hellraiser", "The Ballroom Blitz"

- 1974:

Arrows: "Touch Too Much"
Mud: "Tiger Feet", "The Cat Crept In", "Rocket", "Lonely This Christmas"
Suzi Quatro: "Devil Gate Drive", "Too Big", "The Wild One"
The Sweet: "Teenage Rampage", "The Six Teens", "Turn It Down"

- 1975:

Mud: "The Secrets That You Keep", "Moonshine Sally" (originally recorded in 1972), "One Night"
Suzi Quatro: "Your Mama Won't Like Me"
Smokie: "If You Think You Know How to Love Me", "Don't Play Your Rock 'n' Roll to Me"

- 1976:

Smokie: "Something's Been Making Me Blue", "I'll Meet You at Midnight", "Living Next Door to Alice"

- 1977:

Suzi Quatro: "Tear Me Apart"
Smokie: "Lay Back In The Arms Of Someone", "It's Your Life"

- 1978:

Suzi Quatro: "The Race is On", "If You Can't Give Me Love", "Stumblin' In" (with Chris Norman)
Blondie: "Picture This", "Hanging on the Telephone"
Exile: "Kiss You All Over"
Racey: "Lay Your Love on Me"
Smokie: "For a Few Dollars More", "Oh Carol"

- 1979:

Blondie: "Heart of Glass", "Sunday Girl", "Dreaming", "Union City Blue"
Suzi Quatro: "She's in Love with You"
Racey: "Some Girls", "Kitty" (rewritten as "Mickey" and performed by Toni Basil in 1982)
The Knack: "My Sharona" (producer only)

- 1980:

Blondie: "Atomic", "The Tide Is High"
Suzi Quatro: "Mama's Boy" (producer only), "I've Never Been in Love" (producer only)

- 1981:

Blondie: "Rapture"
Exile "Heart and Soul" (Co-written with Nicky Chinn) – Later Covered by Huey Lewis and the News.

- 1982:

Toni Basil: "Mickey"
Blondie: "Island of Lost Souls", "War Child"

- 1983:

Agnetha Fältskog: "Wrap Your Arms Around Me" (sole producer and co-written with Holly Knight)
Altered Images: "Don't Talk To Me About Love" (sole producer only), "Love To Stay" (sole producer only)
Bow Wow Wow: "Do Ya Wanna Hold Me" (sole producer only)
Huey Lewis and the News: "Heart and Soul"
Pat Benatar: "Love Is a Battlefield" (co-written with Holly Knight)

- 1984:

Tina Turner: "Better Be Good to Me" (co-written with Holly Knight)

- 1985:

Pat Benatar: "Invincible" (sole producer)

- 1986:

Device: "Hanging on a Heart Attack" (sole producer and co-written with Holly Knight)

- 1988:

Bonnie Tyler: "The Best" (co-written with Holly Knight), covered by Tina Turner

- 1989:

Tina Turner: "The Best" (co-written with Holly Knight), also reissued in 1993 as B-side to "I Don't Wanna Fight"

- 1995:

Smokie featuring Roy 'Chubby' Brown: "Living Next Door to Alice" (spoof rendition).

- 1998:

Ace of Base: "Always Have, Always Will" (co-written with Jonas Berggren), "Whenever You're Near Me" (co-written with Jonas Berggren)

== Awards ==
=== MPEG Awards ===
The Music Producer and Engineers’ Guild (MPEG Awards) Awards celebrate excellence in music production and engineering in Australia. They commenced in 2024.

Year	Nominee / work	Award	Result (wins only)	Ref.
2026	Mike Chapman	Lifetime Achievement Award	awarded	

=== Queensland Music Awards ===
The Queensland Music Awards (previously known as Q Song Awards) are annual awards celebrating Queensland, Australia's brightest emerging artists and established legends. They commenced in 2006.

Year	Nominee / work	Award	Result (wins only)
2008	himself	Grant McLennan Lifetime Achievement Award	awarded
