= Scandal (American band) =

American rock band

- Origin: New York City, New York, U.S.
- Genres: Rock; pop rock
- Years active: 1981–1985; 2004–present
- Label: Columbia
- Spinoffs: Bon Jovi
- Members: Patty Smyth; Keith Mack; Tom Welsch; Eran Asias
- Past members: Benjy King; Scott Miller; Zack Smith; Ivan Elias; Frankie LaRocka; Thommy Price; Jon Bon Jovi; Kasim Sulton

Scandal is an American rock band formed in 1981 by Zack Smith and fronted by Patty Smyth. The band scored heavy rotation classics on MTV with "Goodbye to You" (1982) and "Love's Got a Line on You" (1983), setting the stage for their first full-length album on Columbia Records, that spawned an RIAA-certified platinum hit in both the United States and Canada, with the song "The Warrior", peaking at No. 7 in 1984. The song ended up in Billboard's Top 50 songs for that year.

== History ==
Scandal was formed in New York City in 1981 by guitarist Zack Smith. The other initial members included: bassist Ivan Elias (1953–1995), guitarist Keith Mack, keyboardist Benjy King (1953–2012), drummer Frankie LaRocka (1954–2005) (later replaced by Thommy Price), and singer Patty Smyth. Jon Bon Jovi also briefly played guitar for the band in 1982.

The band had much success early on but due to struggles within the group and their record company, it slowly dissolved—losing member after member. By the time "The Warrior" tour hit the road in 1984, all that remained of the original lineup were Smyth and Mack. Scandal broke up shortly after the tour ended. The group (minus Ivan Elias, who died of cancer in June 1995; replaced by Kasim Sulton) reunited in 2004 for VH1's Bands Reunited show and did a string of concerts on the United States East Coast culminating in a show at Irving Plaza in their home city (New York) on February 9, 2005. During the summer of 2006, the band (excluding Price and Sulton) reunited again for VH1's "We Are the '80s" tour, playing a string of large – mainly outdoor – venues and earning critical acclaim. During the summer and fall of 2007, they toured again (this time without Zack Smith).

In July 2008, Billboard reported the upcoming release of new music by Patty Smyth and Scandal (featuring original members Keith Mack and Benjy King). At a performance in Dewey Beach, Delaware on August 3, 2008, Smyth indicated Scandal would be releasing a new five song EP in the near future. Scandal also performed one of their new songs, "Trust in Me". Other new titles include "Make It Hard" and "End of the Girl". Patty Smyth and Scandal debuted their first single as a band ("Hard for You to Love Me", also referred to as "Make It Hard") in over 24 years on January 17, 2009 in Ridgefield, Connecticut to a standing ovation. Smyth stated the song would be available to purchase digitally in February 2009, with the new EP to follow shortly. However, the single had been indefinitely delayed as the EP would be expanded to a full-length album, according to Smyth's blog in May 2009. As of December 2011, the only new music released was "Silent Night", their cover of the Christmas classic, which was featured in the NCIS Season 9 Christmas episode, "Newborn King" and subsequently available for purchase on the band's official website.

Original bassist Ivan Elias died June 4, 1995 from lymphoma. Original drummer Frankie LaRocka died in 2005 after undergoing surgery. Original keyboardist Benjy King died on September 20, 2012, from injuries sustained in an accident.

== Band members ==
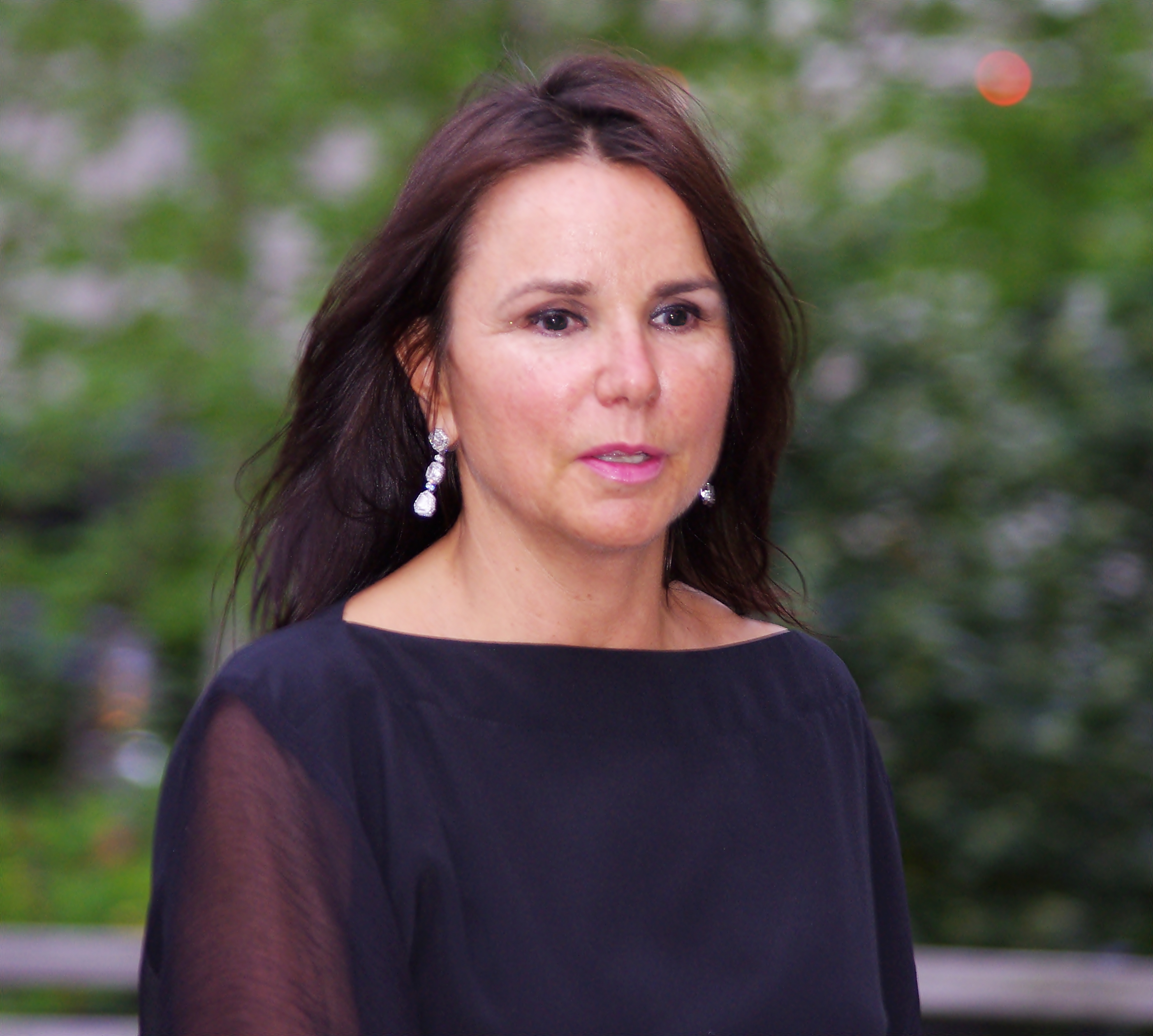
Scandal's lead singer Patty Smyth in 2011

Current members

- Patty Smyth – lead vocals (1981–1985, 2004–present)
- Keith Mack – guitar (1981–1985, 2004–present)
- Tom Welsch – bass (2006–present)
- Eran Asias – drums (2006–present)

Former members

- Benjy King – keyboards, guitar (1981–1984, 2004–2012; his death)
- Zack Smith – guitar (1981–1984, 2004–2006)
- Ivan Elias – bass (1981–1984; died 1995)
- Frankie LaRocka – drums (1981–1982; died 2005)
- Thommy Price – drums (1982–1984, 2004–2006; died 2025)
- Jon Bon Jovi – guitar (1982)
- Kasim Sulton – bass (2004–2006)

Timeline

== Discography ==
=== Albums ===
Year	Album	Chart positions		Certifications
Year	Album	US	AUS	Certifications
1982	Scandal (EP)	39	—	RIAA: Gold
1984	Warrior	17	70	RIAA: Platinum
"—" denotes releases that did not chart.

=== Compilations ===
- Scandalous (1992)
- We Are the '80s (2006)

=== Live albums ===
- Goodbye to You! Best of the 80's Live (2018)

=== Singles ===
Song	Year	Peak chart positions							Album
Song	Year	US BB	US Main.	US CB	AUS	CAN	NZ	UK	Album
"Goodbye to You"	1982	65	5	60	—	—	—	—	Scandal (EP)
"Love's Got a Line on You"	1983	59	28	38	—	—	—	—	Scandal (EP)
"Win Some, Lose Some"	1983	—	—	—	—	—	—	—	Scandal (EP)
"The Warrior"	1984	7	1	5	6	1	11	86	Warrior
"Hands Tied"	1984	41	21	39	83	—	—	—	Warrior
"Beat of a Heart"	1985	41	10	40	—	—	—	—	Warrior
"Silent Night"	2011	—	—	—	—	—	—	—	Non-album single
"—" denotes a recording that did not chart or was not released in that territory.

=== Music videos ===
Scandal has music videos for the following songs:

- "Goodbye to You"
- "Love's Got a Line on You"
- "The Warrior"
- "Beat of a Heart"
- "Hands Tied"

== See also ==
- List of 1980s one-hit wonders in the United States
