= 52nd Golden Globe Awards =

Film award ceremony in 1995

- Date: January 21, 1995
- Site: Beverly Hilton Hotel, Beverly Hills, California
- Hosted by: John Larroquette; Janine Turner

Highlights
- Best Film: Drama: Forrest Gump
- Best Film: Musical or Comedy: The Lion King
- Best Drama Series: The X-Files
- Best Musical or Comedy Series: Mad About You
- Most awards: (3) Forrest Gump; The Lion King; The Burning Season
- Most nominations: (7) Forrest Gump

Television coverage
- Network: TBS

The 52nd ceremony of the Golden Globe Awards, honoring the best in film and television for 1994, was held on January 21, 1995, at the Beverly Hilton Hotel in Beverly Hills, California. The nominations were announced on December 21, 1994.

== Winners and nominees ==
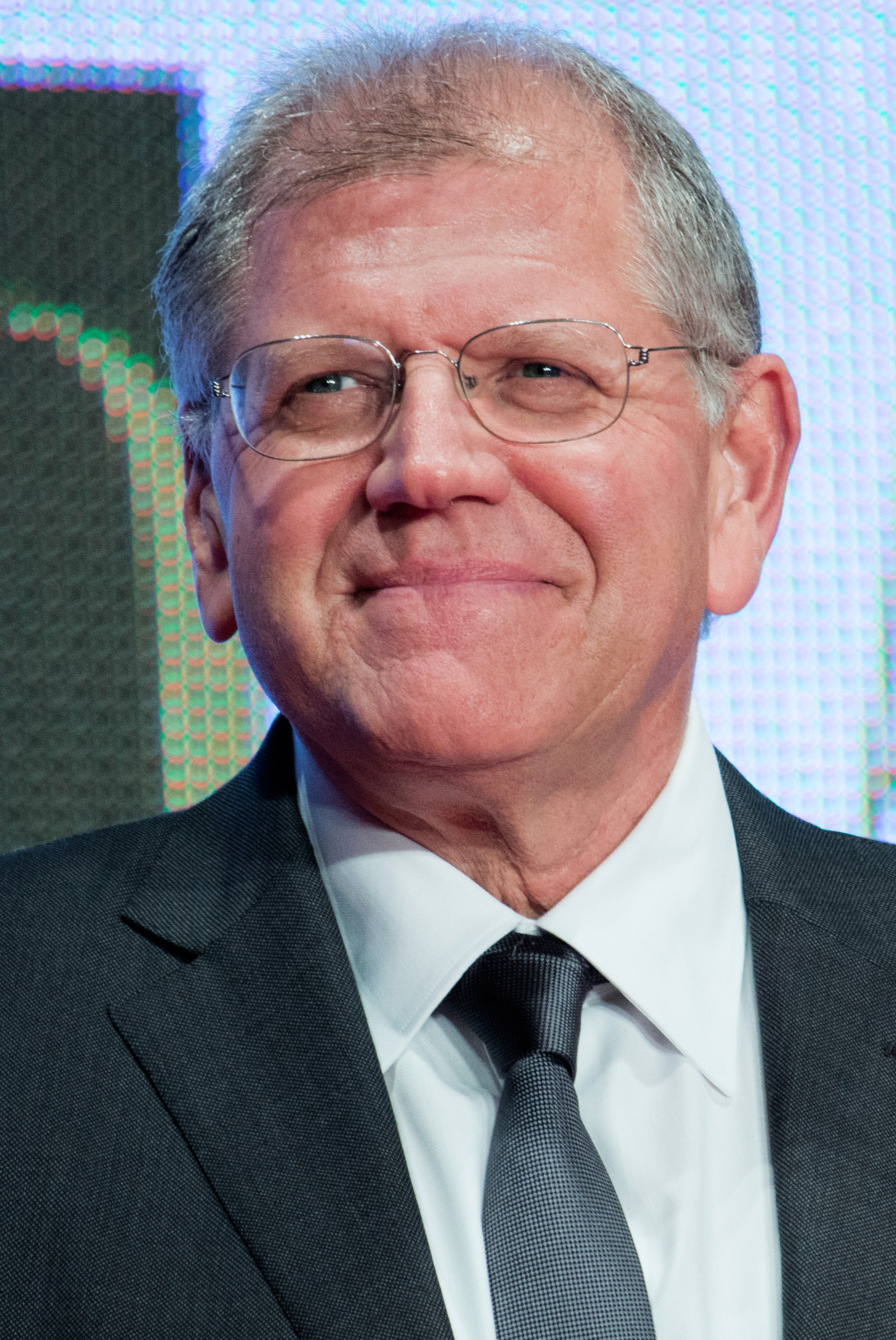
Robert Zemeckis — Best Director, winner

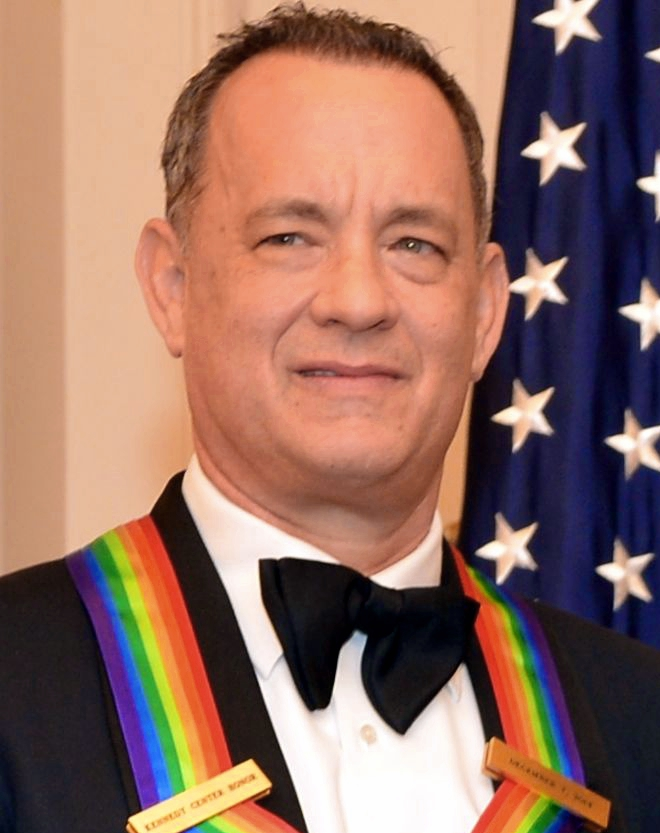
Tom Hanks — Best Actor in a Motion Picture, Drama winner

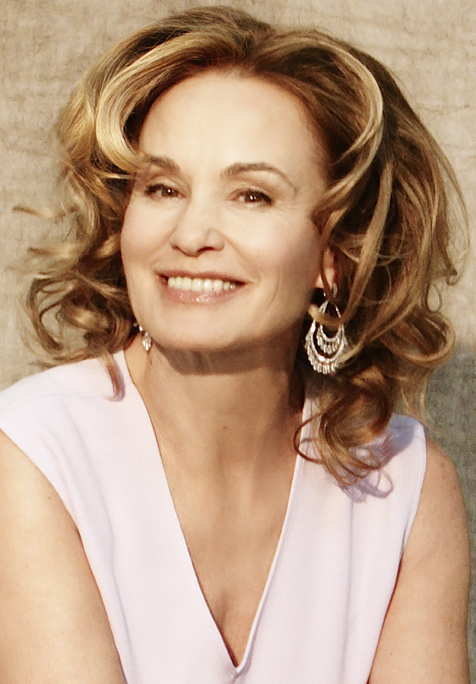
Jessica Lange — Best Actress in a Motion Picture, Drama winner

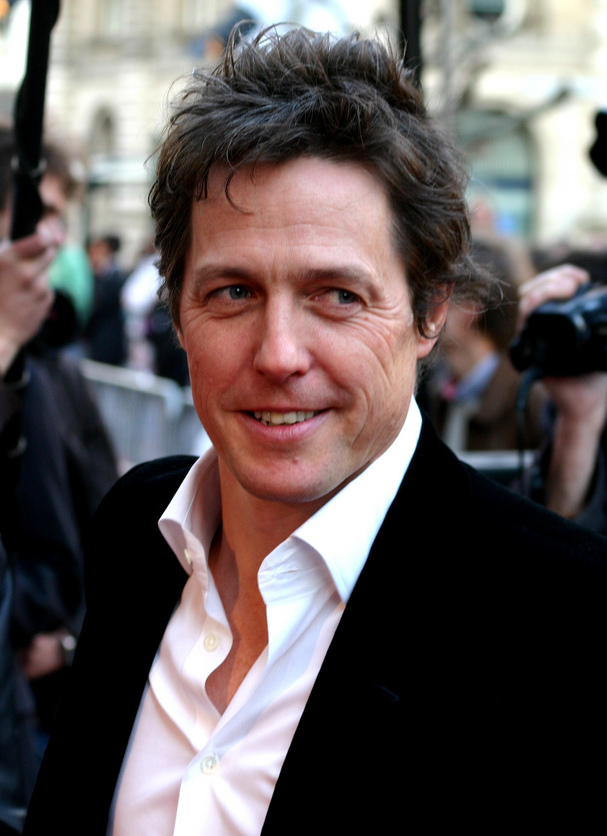
Hugh Grant — Best Actor in a Motion Picture, Musical or Comedy winner

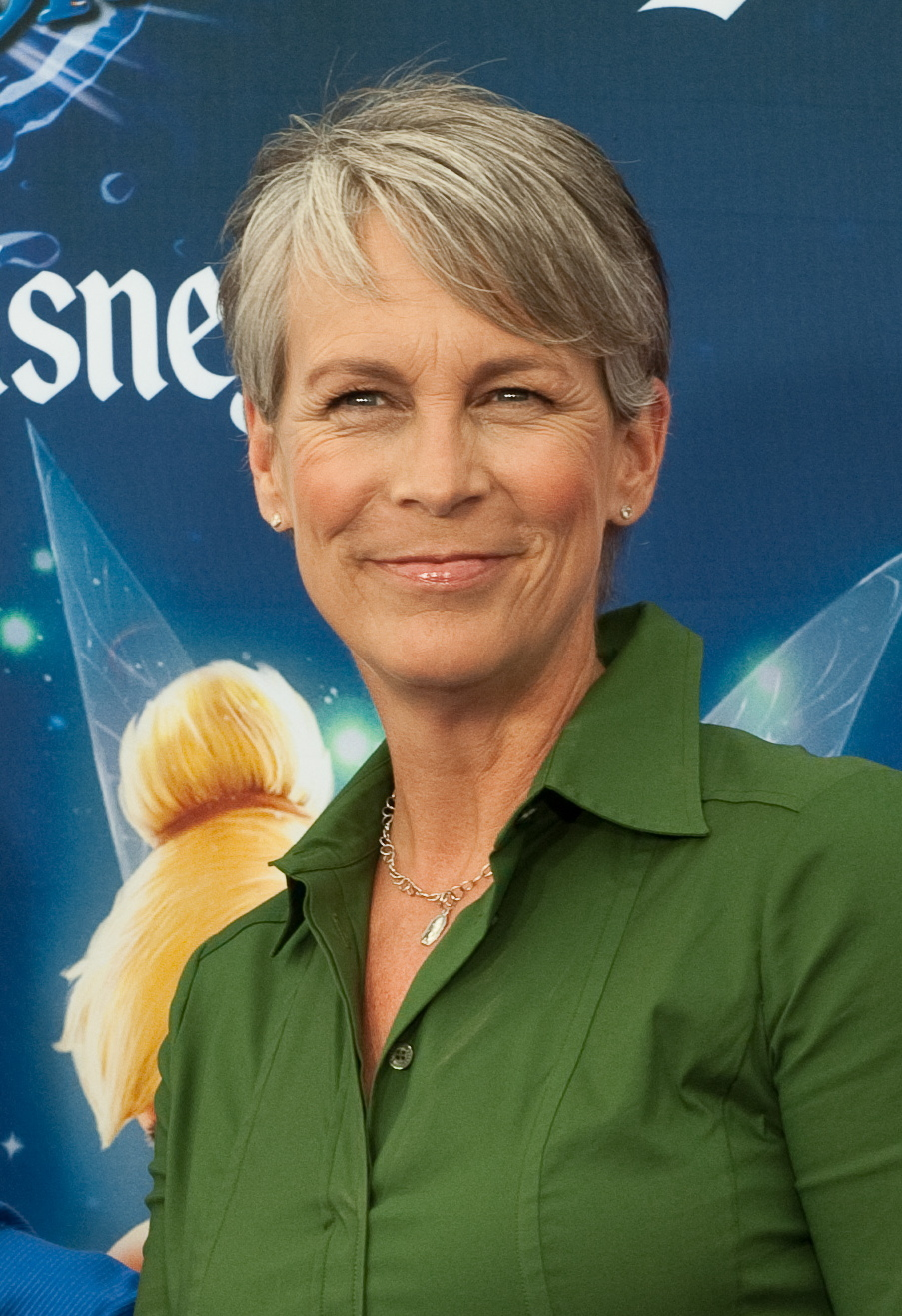
Jamie Lee Curtis — Best Actress in a Motion Picture, Musical or Comedy winner

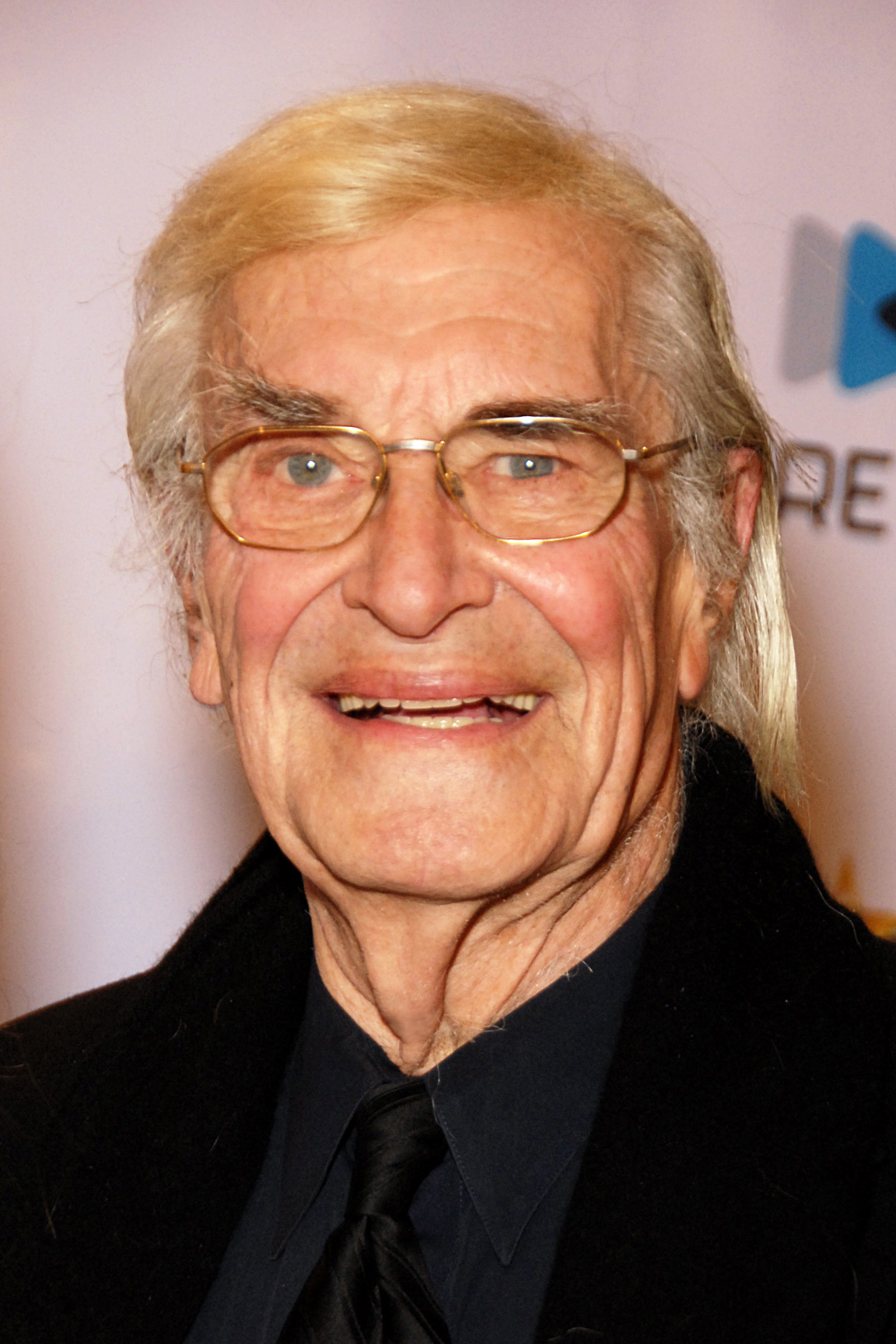
Martin Landau — Best Supporting Actor in a Motion Picture Drama, Musical or Comedy winner

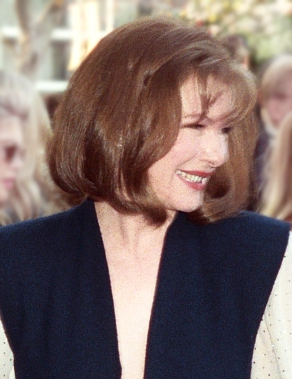
Dianne Wiest — Best Supporting Actress in a Motion Picture Drama, Musical or Comedy winner

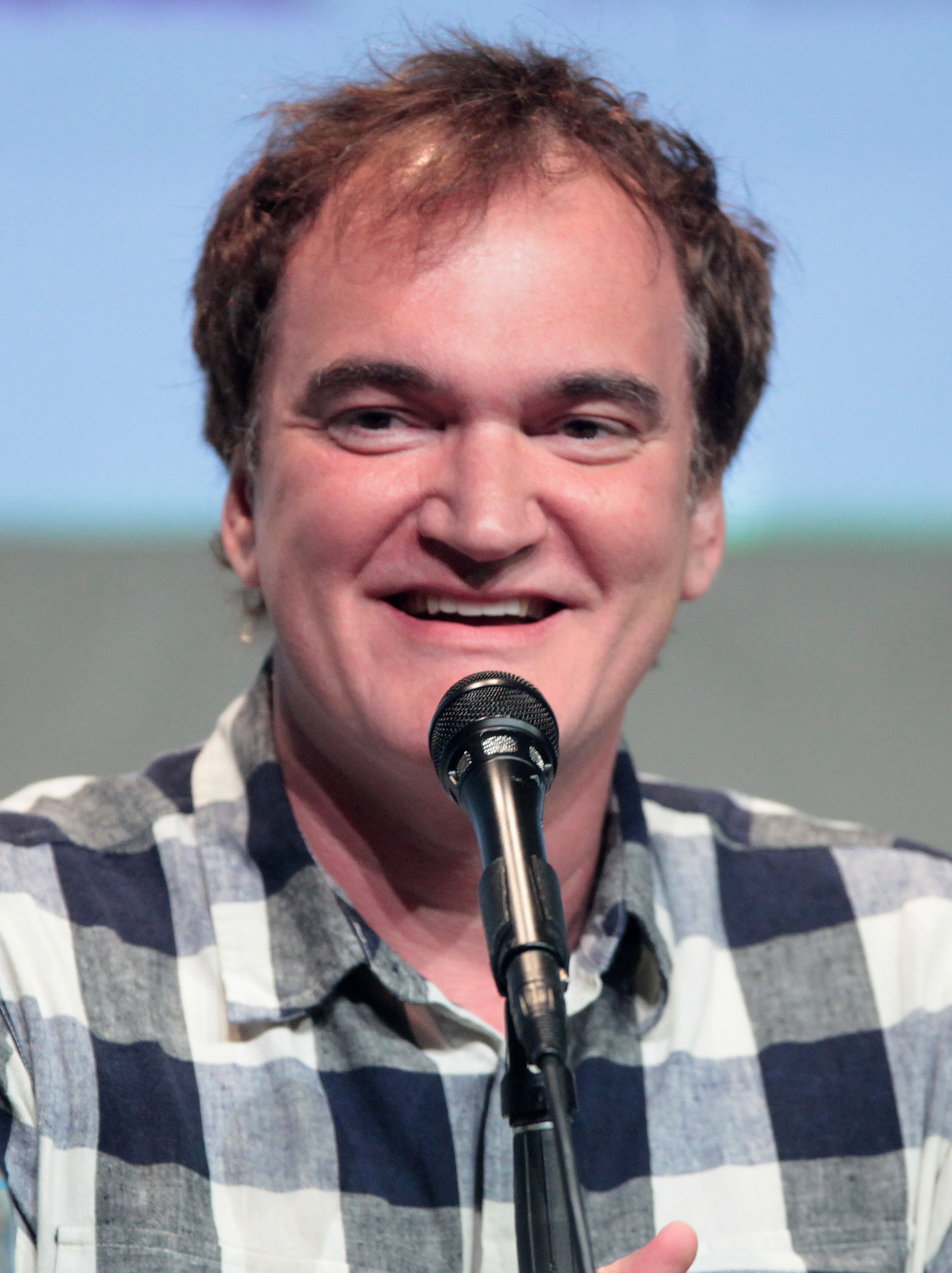
Quentin Tarantino — Best Screenplay winner

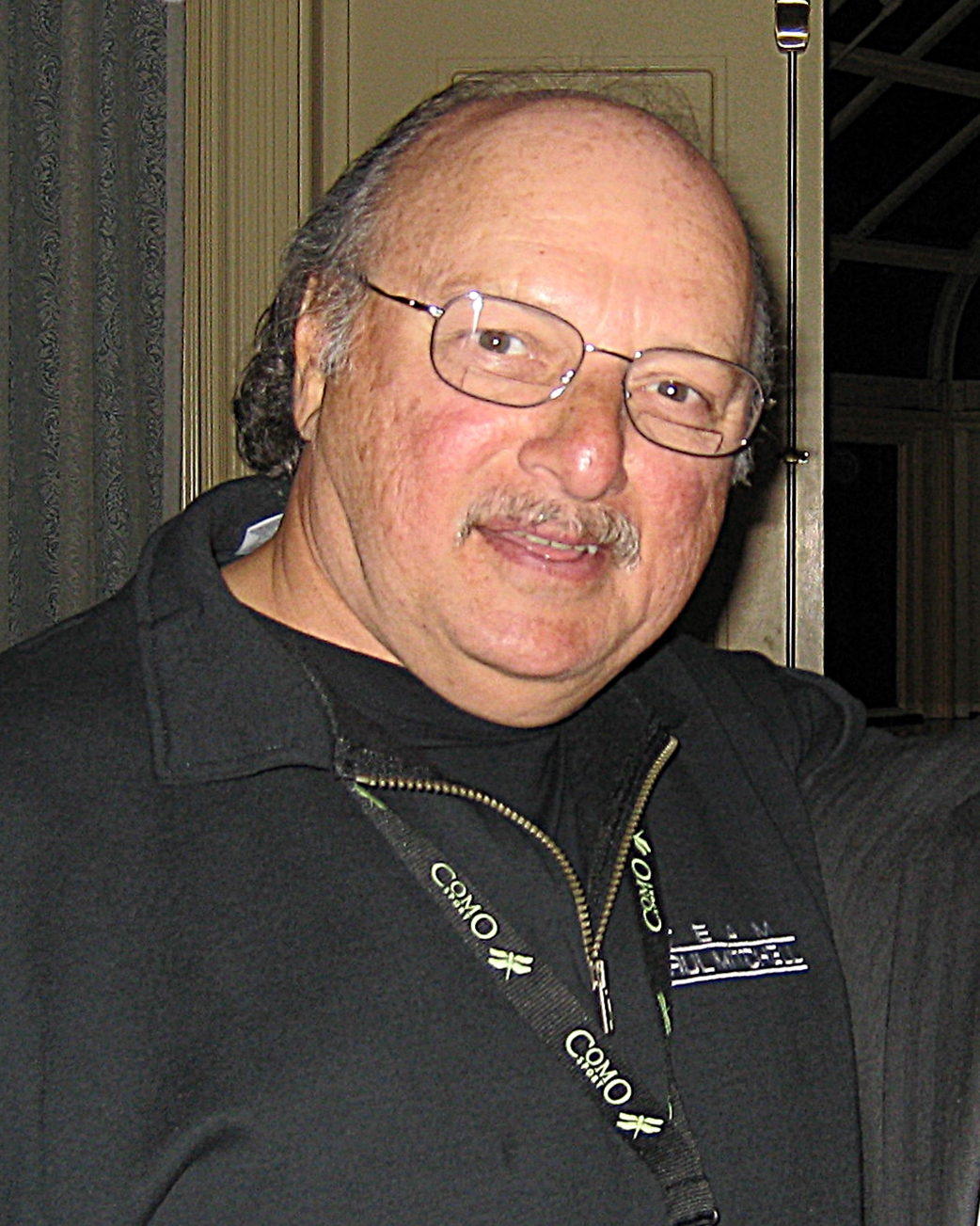
Dennis Franz — Best Actor in a Television Series, Drama winner

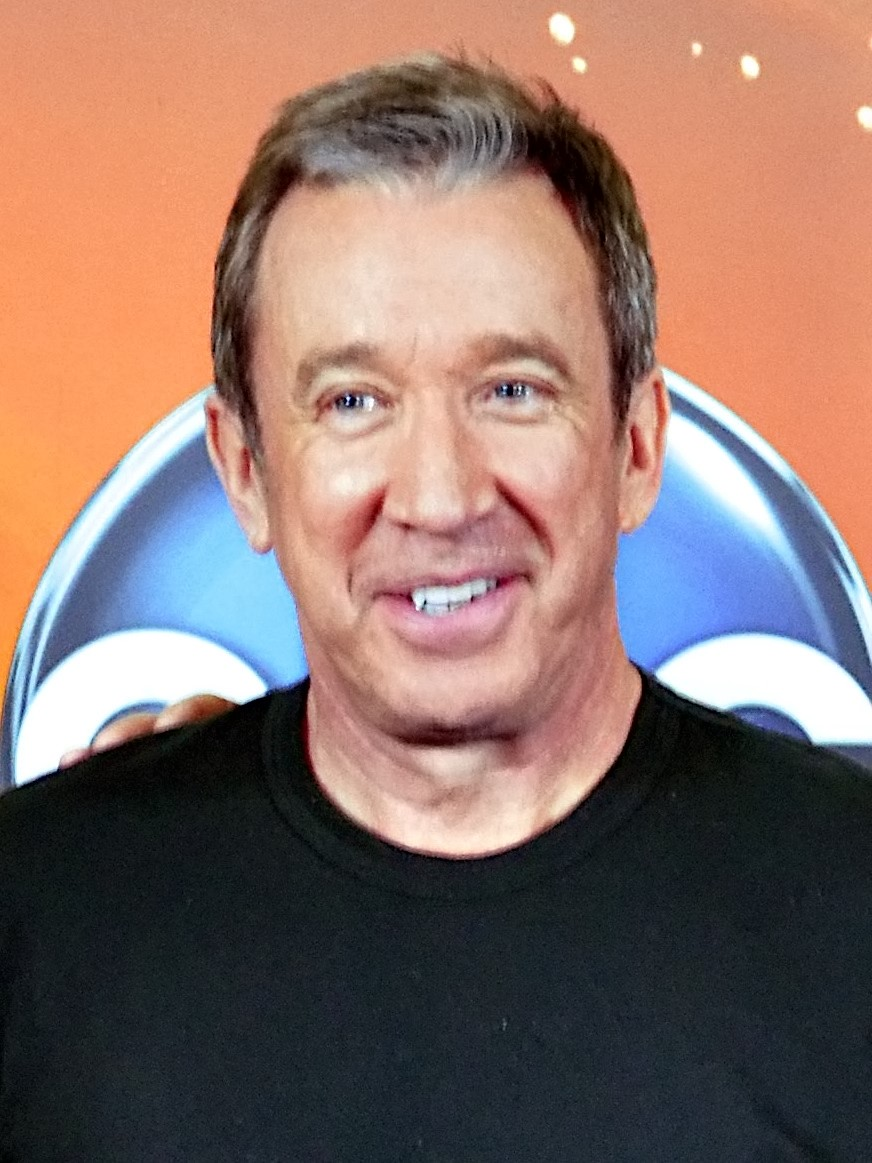
Tim Allen — Best Actor in a Television Series, Musical or Comedy winner

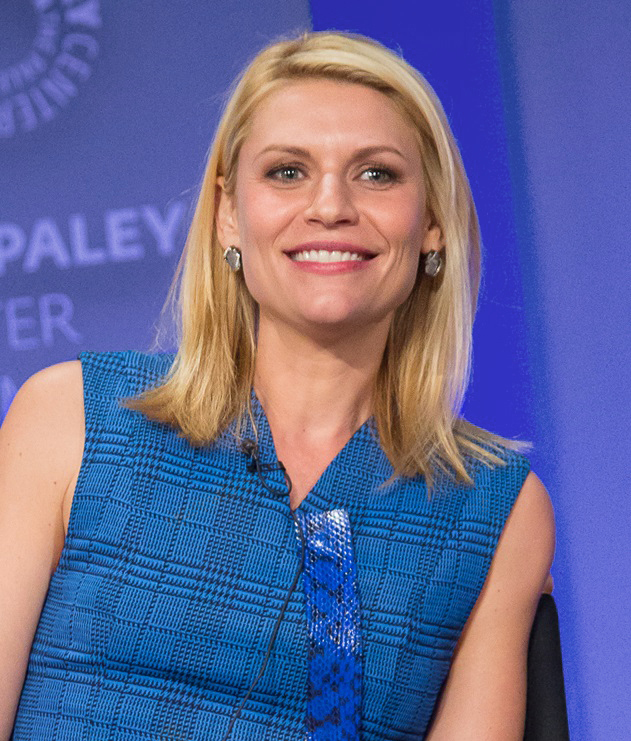
Claire Danes — Best Actress in a Television Series, Drama winner

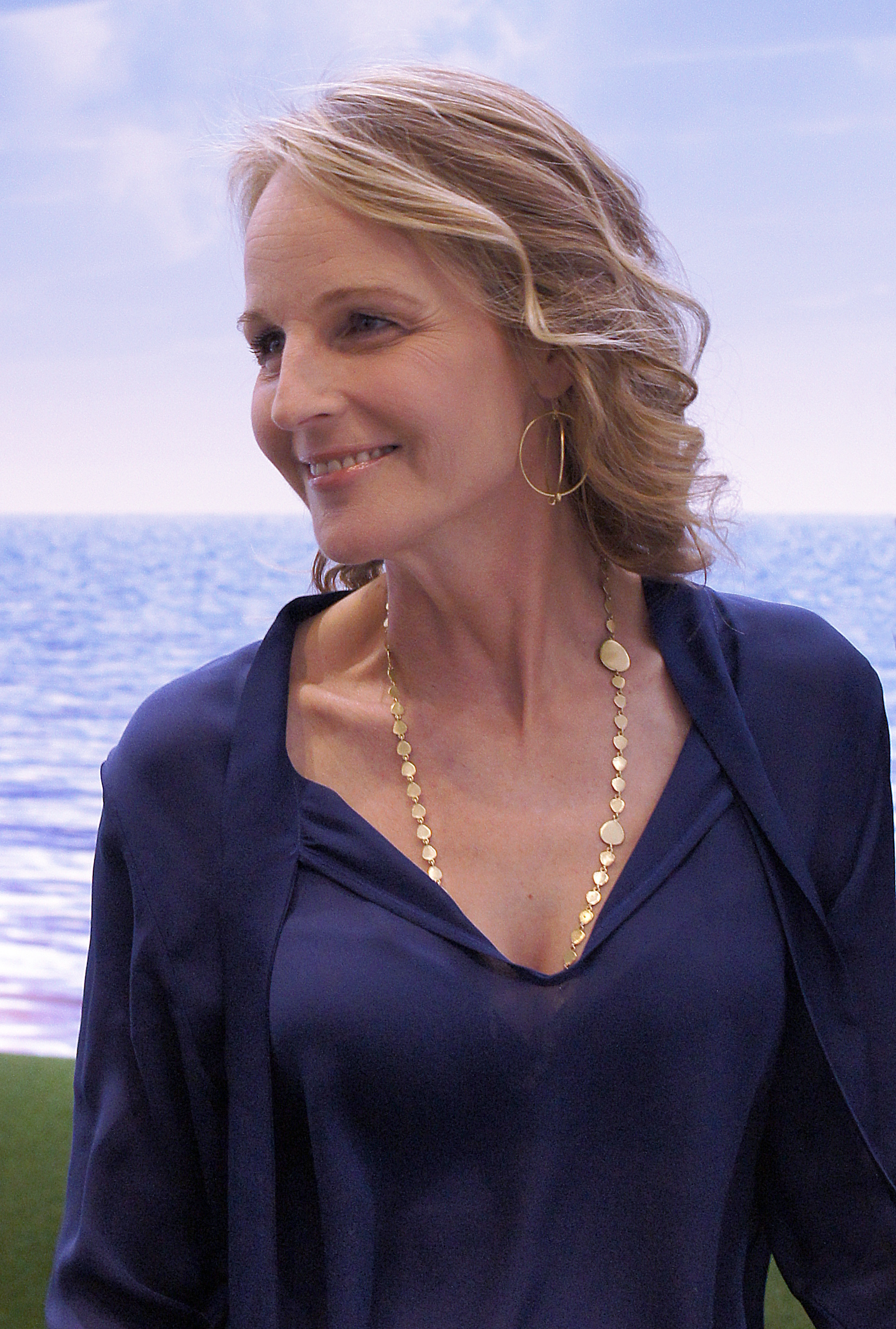
Helen Hunt — Best Actress in a Television Series, Musical or Comedy winner

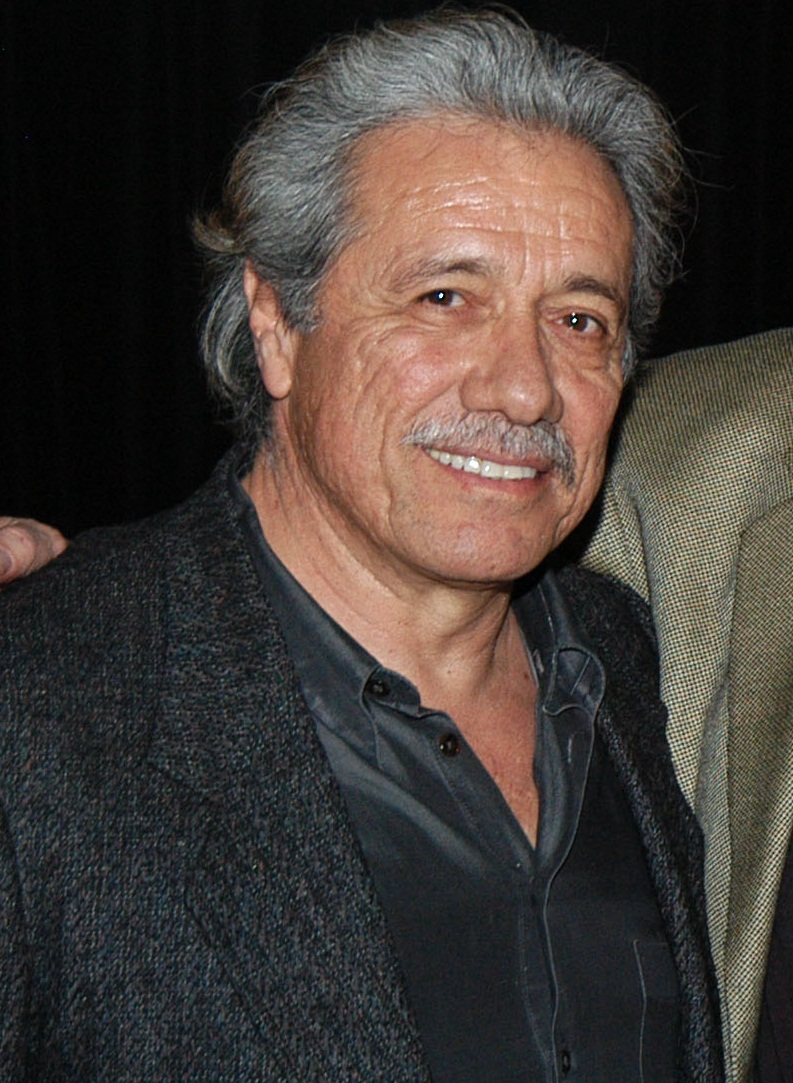
Edward James Olmos — Best Supporting Actor in a Series, Miniseries or Motion Picture Made for Television winner

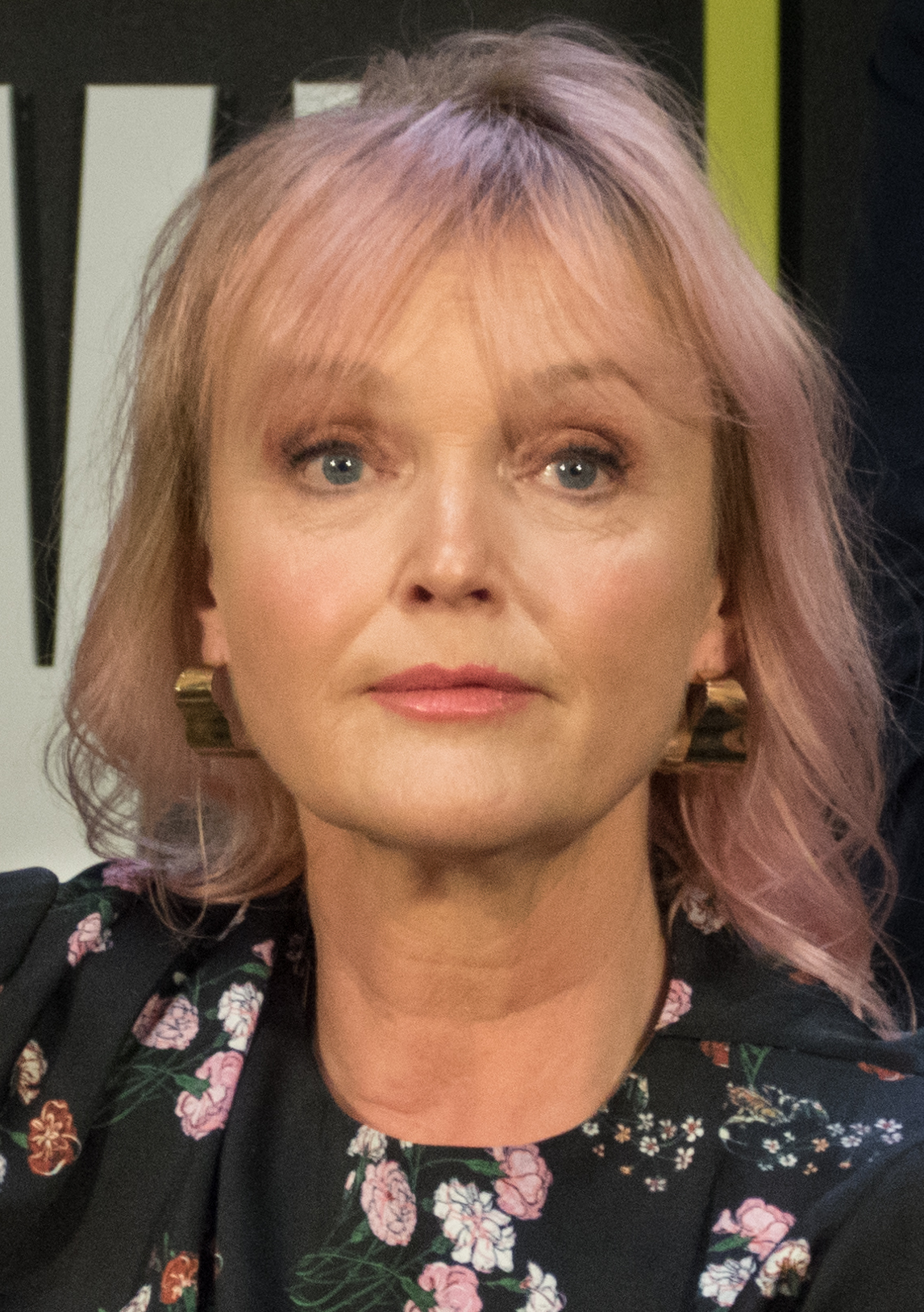
Miranda Richardson — Best Supporting Actress in a Series, Miniseries or Motion Picture Made for Television winner

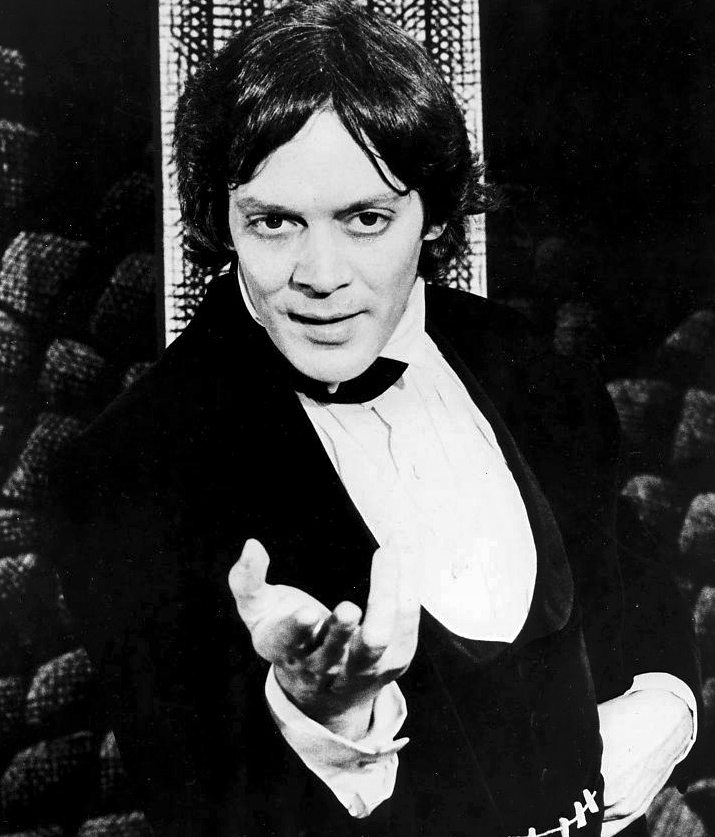
Raul Julia — Best Actor in a Miniseries or Television Film winner

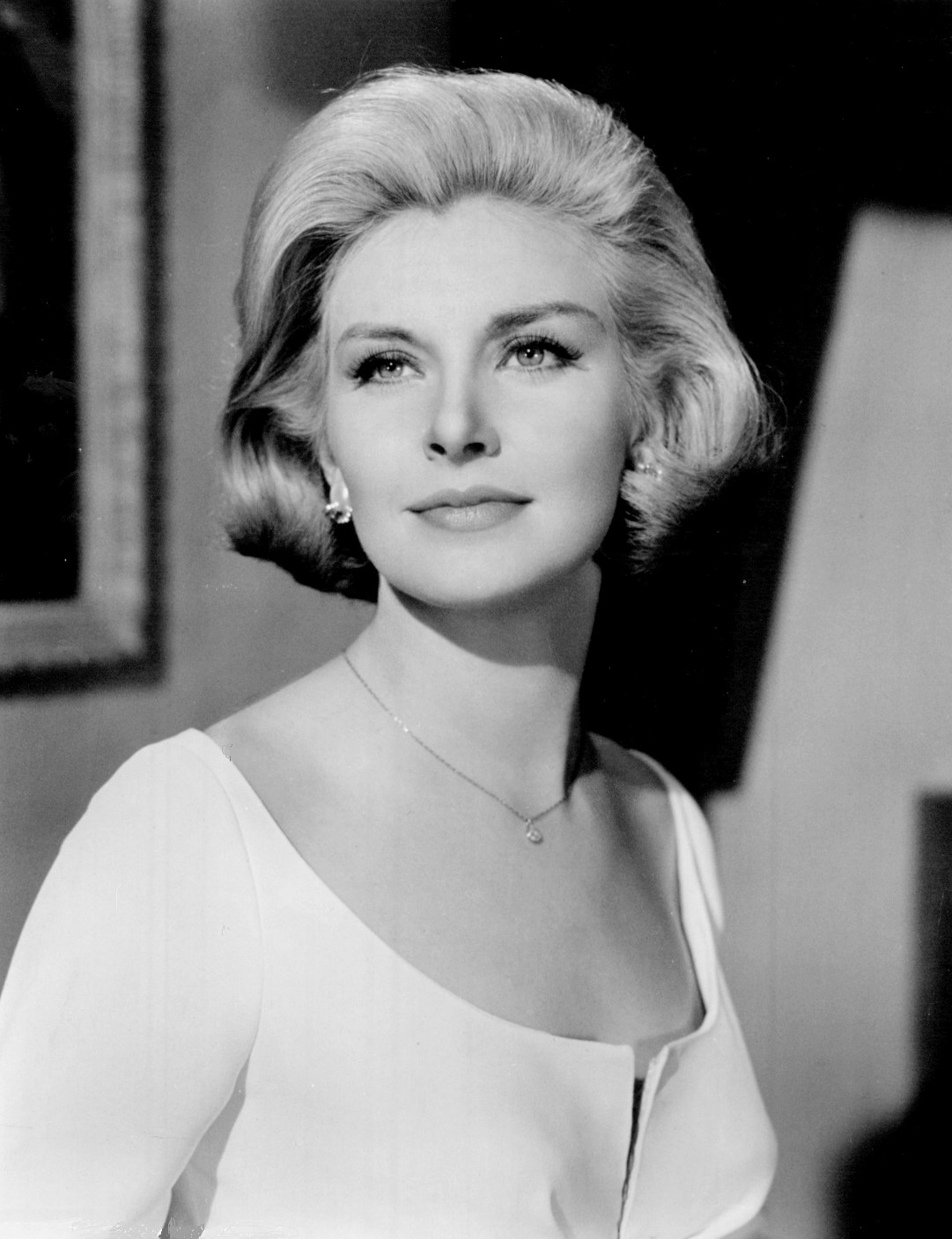
Joanne Woodward — Best Actress in a Miniseries or Television Film winner

=== Film ===
Best Motion Picture
Drama	Musical or Comedy
Forrest Gump: Legends of the Fall; Nell; Pulp Fiction; Quiz Show	The Lion King: The Adventures of Priscilla, Queen of the Desert; Ed Wood; Four Weddings and a Funeral; Prêt-à-Porter
Best Performance in a Motion Picture – Drama
Actor	Actress
Tom Hanks – Forrest Gump as Forrest Gump: Morgan Freeman – The Shawshank Redemption as Ellis "Red" Redding; Paul Newman – Nobody's Fool as Donald "Sully" Sullivan; Brad Pitt – Legends of the Fall as Tristan Ludlow; John Travolta – Pulp Fiction as Vincent Vega	Jessica Lange – Blue Sky as Carly Marshall: Jennifer Jason Leigh – Mrs. Parker and the Vicious Circle as Dorothy Parker; Jodie Foster – Nell as Nell Kellty; Miranda Richardson – Tom & Viv as Vivien Haigh-Wood Eliot; Meryl Streep – The River Wild as Gail Hartman
Best Performance in a Motion Picture – Musical or Comedy
Actor	Actress
Hugh Grant – Four Weddings and a Funeral as Charles: Jim Carrey – The Mask as Stanley Ipkiss / The Mask; Johnny Depp – Ed Wood as Ed Wood; Arnold Schwarzenegger – Junior as Dr. Alexander "Alex" Hesse; Terence Stamp – The Adventures of Priscilla, Queen of the Desert as Bernadette Bassenger	Jamie Lee Curtis – True Lies as Helen Tasker: Geena Davis – Speechless as Julia Mann; Andie MacDowell – Four Weddings and a Funeral as Carrie; Shirley MacLaine – Guarding Tess as Tess Carlisle; Emma Thompson – Junior as Dr. Diana Reddin
Best Supporting Performance in a Motion Picture – Drama, Musical or Comedy
Supporting Actor	Supporting Actress
Martin Landau – Ed Wood as Bela Lugosi: Kevin Bacon – The River Wild as Wade; Samuel L. Jackson – Pulp Fiction as Jules Winnifield; Gary Sinise – Forrest Gump as Lieutenant Dan Taylor; John Turturro – Quiz Show as Herb Stempel	Dianne Wiest – Bullets over Broadway as Helen Sinclair: Kirsten Dunst – Interview with the Vampire as Claudia; Sophia Loren – Prêt-à-Porter as Isabella de la Fontaine; Robin Wright Penn – Forrest Gump as Jennifer "Jenny" Curran; Uma Thurman – Pulp Fiction as Mia Wallace
Best Director	Best Screenplay
Robert Zemeckis – Forrest Gump: Robert Redford – Quiz Show; Oliver Stone – Natural Born Killers; Quentin Tarantino – Pulp Fiction; Edward Zwick – Legends of the Fall	Pulp Fiction – Quentin Tarantino: Forrest Gump – Eric Roth; Four Weddings and a Funeral – Richard Curtis; Quiz Show – Paul Attanasio; The Shawshank Redemption – Frank Darabont
Best Original Score	Best Original Song
The Lion King – Hans Zimmer: Forrest Gump – Alan Silvestri; Interview with the Vampire – Elliot Goldenthal; Legends of the Fall – James Horner; Nell – Mark Isham	"Can You Feel the Love Tonight" by Elton John – The Lion King: "Circle of Life" by Elton John – The Lion King; "The Color of the Night" – Color of Night; "Far Longer than Forever" – The Swan Princess; "I'll Remember" by Madonna – With Honors; "Look What Love Has Done" by Patty Smyth – Junior
Best Foreign Language Film	
Farinelli • Belgium: Eat Drink Man Woman (Yin shi nan nu) • Taiwan; Queen Margot (La Reine Margot) • France; Three Colors: Red (Trois couleurs: Rouge) • Poland/Switzerland; To Live (Huozhe) • Hong Kong	

The following films received multiple nominations:

Nominations	Title
7	Forrest Gump
6	Pulp Fiction
4	Four Weddings and a Funeral
4	Legends of the Fall
4	The Lion King
4	Quiz Show
3	Ed Wood
3	Junior
3	Nell
2	The Adventures of Priscilla, Queen of the Desert
2	Interview with the Vampire: The Vampire Chronicles
2	Pret-a-Porter
2	The Shawshank Redemption

The following films received multiple wins:

Wins	Title
3	Forrest Gump
3	The Lion King

=== Television ===
Best Television Series
Best Series – Drama	Best Series – Comedy or Musical
The X-Files: Chicago Hope; ER; NYPD Blue; Picket Fences	Mad About You: Frasier; Grace Under Fire; Home Improvement; Seinfeld
Best Lead Actor in a Television Series
Best Actor – Drama Series	Best Lead Actor – Comedy or Musical Series
Dennis Franz – NYPD Blue: Mandy Patinkin – Chicago Hope; Jason Priestley – Beverly Hills, 90210; Tom Skerritt – Picket Fences; Sam Waterston – Law & Order	Tim Allen – Home Improvement: Kelsey Grammer – Frasier; Craig T. Nelson – Coach; Paul Reiser – Mad About You; Jerry Seinfeld – Seinfeld; Garry Shandling – The Larry Sanders Show
Best Lead Actress in a Television Series
Best Actress – Drama Series	Best Actress – Comedy or Musical Series
Claire Danes – My So-Called Life: Kathy Baker – Picket Fences; Jane Seymour – Dr. Quinn, Medicine Woman; Angela Lansbury – Murder, She Wrote; Heather Locklear – Melrose Place	Helen Hunt – Mad About You: Candice Bergen – Murphy Brown; Brett Butler – Grace Under Fire; Ellen DeGeneres – Ellen; Patricia Richardson – Home Improvement
Best Supporting Performance – Series, Miniseries or a Television Film
Best Supporting Actor – Series, Miniseries or Television Film	Best Supporting Actress – Series, Miniseries or Television Film
Edward James Olmos – The Burning Season: Jason Alexander – Seinfeld; Fyvush Finkel – Picket Fences; David Hyde Pierce – Frasier; John Malkovich – Heart of Darkness	Miranda Richardson – Fatherland: Sônia Braga – The Burning Season; Tyne Daly – Christy; Laura Leighton – Melrose Place; Jane Leeves – Frasier; Julia Louis-Dreyfus – Seinfeld; Laurie Metcalf – Roseanne; Leigh Taylor-Young – Picket Fences; Liz Torres – The John Larroquette Show
Best Actor – Miniseries or Television Film	Best Actress – Miniseries or Television Film
Raúl Juliá – The Burning Season: Alan Alda – White Mile; James Garner – Breathing Lessons; Rutger Hauer – Fatherland; Samuel L. Jackson – Against the Wall	Joanne Woodward – Breathing Lessons: Kirstie Alley – David's Mother; Irene Bedard – Lakota Woman: Siege at Wounded Knee; Diane Keaton – Amelia Earhart: The Final Flight; Diana Ross – Out of Darkness
Best Miniseries or Television Film	
The Burning Season: Fatherland; The Return of the Native; Roswell; White Mile	

The following programs received multiple nominations:

Nominations	Title
5	Picket Fences
4	The Burning Season
4	Frasier
3	Fatherland
3	Home Improvement
3	Mad About You
3	Seinfeld
2	Breathing Lessons
2	Chicago Hope
2	Grace Under Fire
2	Melrose Place
2	NYPD Blue
2	White Mile

The following programs received multiple wins:

Wins	Title
3	The Burning Season

== Ceremony ==
=== Presenters ===
- Robert Altman
- Rosanna Arquette
- Victor Borge
- Barry Bostwick
- Beau Bridges
- Margaret Cho
- Joan Collins
- Bruce Davison
- Richard Dreyfuss
- Valeria Golino
- Louis Gossett, Jr.
- Marilu Henner
- Charlton Heston
- Lauren Holly
- Sally Kellerman
- Joey Lawrence
- Michele Lee
- Dudley Moore
- Gregory Peck
- Rosie Perez
- Lou Diamond Phillips
- Aidan Quinn
- Anthony Quinn
- Emma Samms
- Arnold Schwarzenegger
- William Shatner
- Cybill Shepherd
- Terence Stamp
- Sharon Stone
- Patrick Swayze
- Jonathan Taylor Thomas
- Jennifer Tilly
- Rip Torn
- Jean-Claude Van Damme
- Sela Ward
- Mykelti Williamson
- Mara Wilson
- Alfre Woodard

=== Cecil B. DeMille Award ===
The Cecil B. DeMille Award is an honorary Golden Globe Award bestowed for "outstanding contributions to the world of entertainment".

- Sophia Loren

=== "In Memoriam" segment ===
- Burt Lancaster
- Raul Julia
- Harriet Nelson
- John Candy
- Cesar Romero
- Martha Raye
- Barry Sullivan
- George Peppard
- Joseph Cotten
- Dinah Shore
- Cab Calloway
- Telly Savalas
- Macdonald Carey
- Mildred Natwick
- Henry Mancini
- Claude Akins
- Cameron Mitchell
- William Conrad
- Melina Mercouri
- Jessica Tandy

== Awards breakdown ==
The following networks received multiple nominations:

Nominations	Network
15	CBS
13	NBC
12	ABC
9	HBO
4	Fox
3	TNT

The following networks received multiple wins:

Wins	Network
2	HBO

== See also ==
- 67th Academy Awards
- 15th Golden Raspberry Awards
- 1st Screen Actors Guild Awards
- 46th Primetime Emmy Awards
- 47th Primetime Emmy Awards
- 48th British Academy Film Awards
- 49th Tony Awards
- 1994 in film
- 1994 in American television
