= James Newton Howard =

American composer and music producer (born 1951)

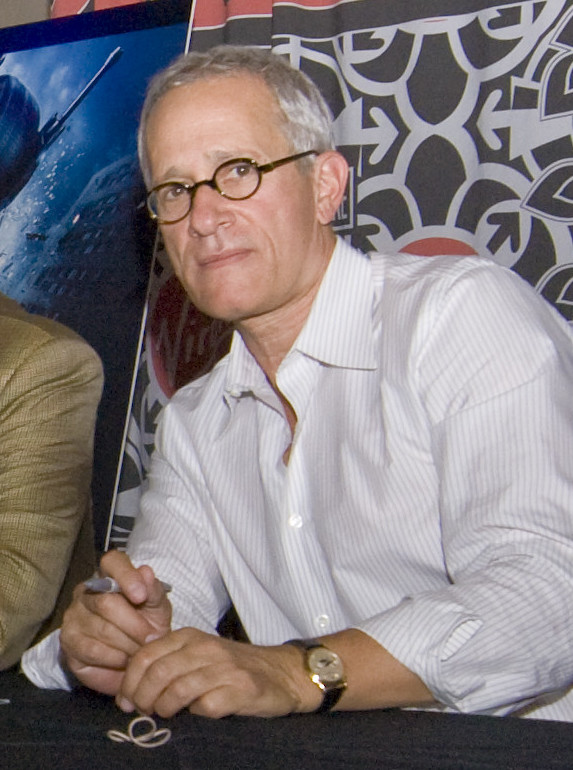
- Howard at the premiere of The Dark Knight, 2008

Background information
- Born: James Newton Howard; June 9, 1951 (age 75); Los Angeles, California, United States
- Genres: Film score; rock; pop rock
- Occupations: Composer; music producer; arranger
- Instrument: Keyboards
- Years active: 1973–present
- Formerly of: Elton John Band; Toto; Crosby, Stills & Nash
- Spouses: Brie Berry (m. 1974; div. 1977); Rosanna Arquette (m. 1986; div. 1987); Sofie Lena Barron (m. 1992)
- Website: jamesnewtonhoward.com

James Newton Howard (born June 9, 1951) is an American film composer, orchestrator and music producer. He has scored over 100 films and is the recipient of a Grammy Award, an Emmy Award, and nine nominations for Academy Awards.

His film scores include Pretty Woman (1990), The Prince of Tides (1991), The Fugitive (1993), Space Jam (1996), The Sixth Sense (1999), Dinosaur (2000), Unbreakable (2000), Atlantis: The Lost Empire (2001), Signs (2002), Treasure Planet (2002), The Village (2004), King Kong (2005), Batman Begins (2005) and its sequel, The Dark Knight (2008) (both composed with Hans Zimmer), Blood Diamond (2006), Michael Clayton (2007), The Hunger Games series (2012–present), the Fantastic Beasts trilogy (2016–2022), and Raya and the Last Dragon (2021). He has collaborated extensively with directors M. Night Shyamalan and Francis Lawrence, having scored eight of Shyamalan's films and eight of Lawrence's films since I Am Legend (2007). He has also worked with other directors such as Peter Jackson, Edward Zwick, Michael Hoffman, P. J. Hogan, Paul Greengrass, Andrew Davis, Lawrence Kasdan, Joe Roth, Martin Campbell, Joe Johnston, Tony Gilroy, Taylor Hackford, Ivan Reitman, Joel Schumacher, and David Yates; conductor Pete Anthony; and violinists Bruce Dukov, and Eun-Mee Ahn.

== Early life and education ==
Howard was born in Los Angeles to Samuel Howard (né Horowitz) and Joan Howard (née Royall). He is from a musical family; his grandmother was a violinist. His father was Jewish but he did not want his children to know he was, so he changed his last name from Horowitz to Howard.

Howard began studying music as a child, taking classical piano lessons at the age of four. He went on to attend the Thacher School in Ojai, California and the Music Academy of the West in Montecito, California with Reginald Stewart and Leon Fleischer. He then attended the University of Southern California, studying at the School of Music as a piano performance major, but dropped out after 6 weeks because "He wanted to do other things than practicing the piano."

== Career ==
=== Early career ===
After Howard left college, he joined a short-lived rock band called Mama Lion. The band was led by Neil Merryweather (bass, backing vocals) and featured lead singer Lynn Carey, Coffi Hall on drums, and Rick Gaxiola on guitar. Mama Lion recorded two full-length albums. Members of Mama Lion also formed the band Heavy Cruiser with Merryweather now on lead vocals, recording two albums whose genre was closer to hard rock but also displayed psychedelic and progressive influences. He then worked for a couple of years as a session musician with artists including Diana Ross, Ringo Starr, and Harry Nilsson. In the early 70s, he described himself as being "dirt poor", until his big break in 1975 when his manager got him an audition with Elton John. He joined John's band and toured with them as keyboardist during the late 70s and early 80s. He was part of the band that played Central Park, New York, on September 13, 1980. Howard also arranged strings for several of John's songs during this period including the hits "Don't Go Breaking My Heart" and "Sorry Seems to Be the Hardest Word", along with "Tonight" (featuring the London Symphony Orchestra). He played additional keyboards and synthesizers on studio albums including Rock of the Westies (1975), Blue Moves (1976), 21 at 33 (1980), and The Fox (1981).

In 1982, Howard was featured on Toto IV as the strings conductor and orchestrator for "I Won't Hold You Back", "Afraid of Love", and "Lovers in the Night". In 1984 the Sheffield Lab direct-to-disc album James Newton Howard and Friends, was released, which featured Toto's David Paich (keyboards), Steve Porcaro (keyboards), Jeff Porcaro (drums), and Joe Porcaro (percussion). Howard's track "L'daddy" was used as benchmark testing in International Auto Sound Challenge Association (IASCA) SPL testing.

In 1983, Howard was co-producer, musician (keyboards), and orchestrator of Riccardo Cocciante's album Sincerità. He also created five arrangements for the album "Aznavour '83" by Charles Aznavour, which was recorded in California.

In 1984, Howard composed his first piece of score for a film, receiving a co-writing credit with David Paich for the cue "Trip to Arrakis" in Toto's music for the David Lynch film Dune.

After briefly touring with Crosby, Stills, and Nash, he took an opportunity brought to him by his manager to write a score for a film. This career move would lead to his becoming a successful film music composer. During this early foray into film music, Howard returned for a brief collaboration with Elton John on his Tour De Force of Australia in the fall of 1986. He conducted both his own and Paul Buckmaster's arrangements during the second half of the set, which focused on orchestrated performances of selected songs from the Elton John catalog.

=== 1990s–2000s ===
Howard scored the romantic comedy Pretty Woman (1990) and received his first Academy Award nomination for his score for Barbra Streisand's drama The Prince of Tides (1991). Setting the musical mood for numerous films throughout the decade, Howard's skills encompassed a plethora of genres, including four more best original score Oscar nominations, for the Harrison Ford action feature The Fugitive (1993), the Julia Roberts romantic comedy My Best Friend's Wedding (1997), M. Night Shyamalan's The Village (2004), and Michael Clayton (2007). In addition, Howard scored the Western epic Wyatt Earp (1994), Kevin Costner's Waterworld (1995), and Primal Fear (1996). His collaborations on songs for One Fine Day (1996) and Junior (1994) garnered Oscar nominations for Best Song. Along with scoring small-scaled, independent films such as Five Corners (1988), Glengarry Glen Ross (1992), and American Heart (1993), Howard proved equally skilled at composing for big-budget Hollywood spectacles, including Space Jam (1996), Dante's Peak (1997) (theme only – score was composed by John Frizzell), Vertical Limit (2000), and Collateral (2004). He has also scored four Disney animated feature films: Dinosaur (2000), Atlantis: The Lost Empire (2001), Treasure Planet (2002), and Raya and the Last Dragon (2021). Although he concentrates primarily on films, Howard has also contributed music for TV, earning an Emmy nomination in 1995 for his theme to NBC's ratings smash ER (Howard also scored the two-hour pilot); he also provided the themes for The Sentinel and Gideon's Crossing, winning an Emmy for the latter.

He has scored many of Shyamalan's suspense thrillers, The Sixth Sense (1999), Unbreakable (2000), Signs (2002), The Village (2004), Lady in the Water (2006), The Happening (2008), and The Last Airbender (2010), notably dropping the intense, yet subtle, opening credit music for The Sixth Sense from the corresponding soundtrack album.

On October 14, 2005, Howard replaced Howard Shore as composer for King Kong, due to "differing creative aspirations for the score" between Shore and director Peter Jackson. The resultant score earned Howard his first Golden Globe nomination for Best Original Score. His work on Michael Clayton earned him an Oscar nomination. He followed in 2008 with his eighth Oscar nomination for Edward Zwick's Defiance. He also collaborated with Hans Zimmer on the scores for Batman Begins and its record-breaking sequel The Dark Knight.

Further works were The Happening, his sixth film with M. Night Shyamalan, Blood Diamond, Michael Clayton, The Water Horse: Legend of the Deep, I Am Legend, Charlie Wilson's War, and Shyamalan's 2010 film adaptation of the Nickelodeon series Avatar: the Last Airbender.

Howard debuted his work for symphony orchestra, I Would Plant A Tree, in February 2009 as part of the Pacific Symphony's annual American Composers Festival. The debut took place at the Renee and Henry Segerstrom Concert Hall in Costa Mesa, California, with the Symphony under the direction of Carl St.Clair.

After being replaced in later seasons, his original theme song for the hit TV show ER returned for the final episode of the series.

=== 2010s ===
In September 2010, he was appointed visiting professor of media composition at the Royal Academy of Music in London.

He composed the Legendary Entertainment fanfare from 2010 to 2017, and he also composed the 2011 FilmDistrict fanfare.

From 2012 to 2023, James Newton Howard scored the music for the critically acclaimed The Hunger Games franchise.

From 2014 to 2015, Howard saw major success with The Hunger Games: Mockingjay – Part 1 when he composed the score for the movie, which included "The Hanging Tree", featuring vocals from actress Jennifer Lawrence. The song peaked at number 12 on the Billboard Hot 100, becoming the highest-charting single from The Hunger Games movies and both Howard's and Lawrence's first chart single.

In 2014, Howard scored two Academy Award-nominated films, Nightcrawler and Maleficent.

Howard composed the score for the fantasy drama Fantastic Beasts and Where to Find Them, a spin-off/prequel of the Harry Potter film series, and for its sequels, Fantastic Beasts: The Crimes of Grindelwald and Fantastic Beasts: The Secrets of Dumbledore.

In 2015, James Newton Howard was named the new artistic director of the Henry Mancini Institute (HMI) at the Frost School of Music at the University of Miami in Coral Gables, Florida.

On March 23–24, 2019, Los Angeles Chamber Orchestra gave the world premiere of Howard's Concerto for Cello & Orchestra with LACO principal cello Andrew Shulman as the soloist. The Los Angeles Times described the work as having "an elegiac tone, along with thematic material from the beginning and closing titles of Red Sparrow" the score of which Howard was working on while first composing the concerto.

== Personal life ==
When delving into his family history, 25 years after the death of his father, Howard learned that his father was Jewish (the family's original surname was Horowitz). Although raised Protestant, Howard later became a practicing Reconstructionist Jew after learning that his father was Jewish.

Howard was married to Rosanna Arquette in 1986; they are divorced. From 1990 to 1991, he was in a relationship with Barbra Streisand. He is married to Sophie Howard, with whom he has a son.

== Awards ==
In May 2008, he was made an Honorary Member of the Royal Academy of Music.

In 2009, he was awarded a Grammy alongside Hans Zimmer for the score soundtrack album to The Dark Knight.

In October 2015, he was honored with the Max Steiner Film Music Achievement Award during the annual Hollywood in Vienna concert.

Award	Year	Project	Category	Outcome
Academy Awards	1992	The Prince of Tides	Best Original Score	Nominated
Academy Awards	1994	The Fugitive	Best Original Score	Nominated
Academy Awards	1995	Junior (shared with Carole Bayer Sager, James Ingram and Patty Smyth)	Best Original Song	Nominated
Academy Awards	1997	One Fine Day (shared with Jud Friedman and Allan Dennis Rich)	Best Original Song	Nominated
Academy Awards	1998	My Best Friend's Wedding	Best Original Score	Nominated
Academy Awards	2005	The Village	Best Original Score	Nominated
Academy Awards	2008	Michael Clayton	Best Original Score	Nominated
Academy Awards	2009	Defiance	Best Original Score	Nominated
Academy Awards	2021	News of the World	Best Original Score	Nominated
Annie Awards	2000	Dinosaur	Music in a Feature Production	Nominated
Annie Awards	2001	Atlantis: The Lost Empire	Music in a Feature Production	Nominated
BAFTA Awards	2009	The Dark Knight (shared with Hans Zimmer)	Anthony Asquith Award for Best Film Music	Nominated
Emmy Awards	1989	Men	Outstanding Main Title Theme Music	Nominated
Emmy Awards	1995	ER	Outstanding Main Title Theme Music	Nominated
Emmy Awards	2001	Gideon's Crossing	Outstanding Main Title Theme Music	Won
Emmy Awards	2016	All the Way	Outstanding Music Composition for a Limited Series, Movie, or Special (Original Dramatic Score)	Nominated
Emmy Awards	2017	A Series of Unfortunate Events: The Bad Beginning	Outstanding Music Composition for a Series (Original Dramatic Score)	Nominated
Emmy Awards	2023	Light & Magic: Gang of Outsiders	Outstanding Music Composition for a Documentary Series or Special (Original Dramatic Score)	Nominated
Emmy Awards	2024	All the Light We Cannot See: Episode 4	Outstanding Music Composition for a Limited Series, Movie, or Special (Original Dramatic Score)	Nominated
Golden Globe Awards	1995	Junior (shared with Carole Bayer Sager, James Ingram and Patty Smyth)	Best Original Song	Nominated
Golden Globe Awards	1997	One Fine Day (shared with Jud Friedman and Allan Dennis Rich)	Best Original Song	Nominated
Golden Globe Awards	2006	King Kong	Best Original Score	Nominated
Golden Globe Awards	2009	Defiance	Best Original Score	Nominated
Golden Globe Awards	2021	News of the World	Best Original Score	Nominated
Grammy Awards	1998	For The First Time (from One Fine Day) (shared with Jud Friedman and Allan Dennis Rich)	Best Song Written Specifically for a Motion Picture or for Television	Nominated
Grammy Awards	2003	Signs – Main Titles	Best Instrumental Composition	Nominated
Grammy Awards	2001	The Egg Travels	Best Instrumental Composition	Nominated
Grammy Awards	2008	Blood Diamond	Best Score Soundtrack Album for Motion Picture, Television or other Visual Media	Nominated
Grammy Awards	2009	The Dark Knight (shared with Hans Zimmer)	Best Score Soundtrack Album for Motion Picture, Television or other Visual Media	Won
Satellite Awards	2007	The Lookout	Best Original Score	Nominated
Satellite Awards	2010	Salt	Best Original Score	Nominated
Satellite Awards	2011	Water for Elephants	Best Original Score	Nominated
Satellite Awards	2020	News of the World	Best Original Score	Nominated
Saturn Awards	2000	Dinosaur	Best Music	Nominated
Saturn Awards	2006	Batman Begins (shared with Hans Zimmer)	Best Music	Nominated
Saturn Awards	2009	The Dark Knight (shared with Hans Zimmer)	Best Music	Won
Saturn Awards	2017	Fantastic Beasts and Where to Find Them	Best Music	Nominated
World Soundtrack Awards	2001	Atlantis: The Lost Empire (shared with Diane Warren)	Best Original Song Written for a Film	Nominated
World Soundtrack Awards	2005	Batman Begins (shared with Hans Zimmer)	Best Original Soundtrack of the Year	Nominated
World Soundtrack Awards	2006	King Kong	Best Original Soundtrack of the Year	Nominated
World Soundtrack Awards	2006	King Kong	Soundtrack Composer of the Year	Nominated
World Soundtrack Awards	2008	I Am Legend	Soundtrack Composer of the Year	Won
World Soundtrack Awards	2008	Michael Clayton	Soundtrack Composer of the Year	Won
World Soundtrack Awards	2008	Charlie Wilson's War	Soundtrack Composer of the Year	Won
World Soundtrack Awards	2013	The Bourne Legacy	Film Composer of the Year	Nominated
World Soundtrack Awards	2013	After Earth	Film Composer of the Year	Nominated

== Discography ==
=== Albums ===
Year	Title	Musician	Notes
1974	Goodnight Vienna	Ringo Starr	Synthesizer for "Snookeroo"
1974	Rock 'n' Roll Survivors	Fanny	Synthesizer and clavinet
1974	James Newton Howard		
1975	Playing Possum	Carly Simon	Electric piano and synthesizer for "Look Me in the Eyes"
1975	He Don't Like You, Like I Love You	Tony Orlando and Dawn	Keyboards
1975	Melissa	Melissa Manchester	Electric piano, clavinet, ARP synthesizer, organ, piano, celeste keyboards
1975	It's in Everyone of Us	David Pomeranz	Electric piano and synthesizer for "The Hit Song of All Time" and "If You Walked Away"; Synthesizer for "Flying" and "Greyhound Mary"
1975	Rock of the Westies	Elton John	Clavinet, ARP synthesizer, Elka Synthex, harpsichord, Mellotron, electric piano
1976	...That's the Way It Is	Harry Nilsson	Keyboards
1976	Blue Moves	Elton John	Conductor/arrangement for "Tonight", "Sorry Seems to Be the Hardest Word", and "Bite Your Lip (Get Up and Dance!)"; Co-writer for "One Horse Town" and "The Wide-Eyed and Laughing"; Synthesizer, electric piano, organ, Mellotron
1976	The Faragher Brothers	The Faragher Brothers	ARP synthesizer for "Never Get Your Love Behind Me"
1976	Help Is on the Way	Melissa Manchester	String arrangement for "Be Somebody", "Help Is on the Way", "Dirty Work", and "There's More Where That Came From"; Electric piano for "Be Somebody"
1976	The Movies	The Movies	Synthesizer on "Satellite Touchdown"
1976	Endless Flight	Leo Sayer	Synthesizer on "Reflections" and "When I Need You"
1976	Better Days & Happy Endings	Melissa Manchester	ARP synthesizer
1976	Beautiful Noise	Neil Diamond	ARP synthesizer on "If You Know What I Mean", "Home Is a Wounded Heart", and "Jungletime"
1976	Something New	Barbi Benton	Keyboards
1977	Kiki Dee	Kiki Dee	Piano for all tracks except "Standing Room Only" and "First Thing in the Morning, Last Thing at Night"; Writer for "Sweet Creation"; Arrangement for "Sweet Creation", "Night Hours", and "In Return"; ARP synthesizer for "Sweet Creation" and "Standing Room Only"; Mellotron for "Into Eternity"; Organ for "Standing Room Only", "Keep Right On", and "In Return"; Electric piano and strings for "Night Hours"
1978	Wild Child	Valerie Carter	Producer, various keyboards, co-writer (Taking the Long Way Home, Lady In The Dark)
1980	Black Rose	Black Rose / Cher	Producer of the album, co-writer of the song (and first single) "Never Should've Started".
1982	Toto IV	Toto	Orchestral arrangements and Conductor on "I Won't Hold You Back", "It's a Feeling", "Afraid of Love" and "Lovers in the Night".
1982	Let Me Rock You	Peter Criss	Keyboards and synthesizer
1983	James Newton Howard and Friends	James Newton Howard; David Paich (keyboards); Steve Porcaro (keyboards); Jeff Porcaro (drums); Joe Porcaro (percussion)	Recorded live, direct-to-disc
1983	In Your Eyes	George Benson	Co-producer, co-writer, keyboards, synthesizer and string arrangements on "Lady Love Me (One More Time) with David Paich
1983	Allies	Crosby, Stills & Nash	keyboards
1983	What A Feelin'	Irene Cara	Producer and keyboards on "You Were Made For Me"
1983	Stompin' at the Savoy	Chaka Khan	Additional keyboards and synthesizer on "Ain't Nobody"
1984	I Feel for You	Chaka Khan	Producer and co-writer with David "Hawk" Wolinski on "Hold Her", keyboards, synthesizer
1984	20/20	George Benson	Co-writer of "Please Don't Walk Away" with Steve Lukather, keyboards, synthesizer, string arrangements
1984	Emotion	Barbra Streisand	keyboards, string arrangements on "Clear Sailing"
1984	Solid	Ashford & Simpson	Producer, keyboards and drum programming on "Closest to Love"
1984	1100 Bel Air Place	Julio Iglesias	keyboards
1984	Isolation	Toto	Orchestral arrangements on "How Does it Feel" and "Change of Heart".
1985	Eaten Alive	Diana Ross	keyboards
1985	Anywhere You Go	David Pack	Producer on "Prove Me Wrong", keyboards, synthesizer, string arrangements
1985	The Magazine	Rickie Lee Jones	Producer, keyboards, synthesizer, string arrangements
1985	Perspective	America	synthesizer on "(It's Like You) Never Left At All" with Randy Kerber
1985	Behind the Sun	Eric Clapton	Producer, synthesizer on "Something's Happening"
1986	East of Midnight	Gordon Lightfoot	keyboards, synthesizer, arrangements
1986	Abstract Emotions	Randy Crawford	Producer, keyboards, synthesizer on "Don't Wanna Be Normal"
1987	Flash In Japan	Eikichi Yazawa	Producer, keyboards, synthesizer
1987	Collaboration	George Benson & Earl Klugh	synthesizer on "Since You're Gone"
1988	The Seventh One	Toto	String arrangements on "Anna".
1988	The Rumour	Olivia Newton-John	Producer, keyboards, synthesizer, drum programming on "The Rumour"
1988	Land of Dreams	Randy Newman	Producer, keyboards, synthesizer
1988	Soul Searchin'	Glenn Frey	Producer and co-writer of "Two Hearts" with David "Hawk" Wolinski
1989	Somebody Loves You	Paul Anka	Additional keyboards, synth horns on "A Steel Guitar and A Glass of Wine"
1989	Vonda Shepard	Vonda Shepard	Producer, keyboards, synthesizer, co-writer of "Baby, Don't You Break My Heart Slow"
1989	Larger than Life	Jody Watley	Co-writer of "Everything" with Gardner Cole
1989	Can't Escape the Rhythm	Gregory Hines	Producer and co-writer with Glen Ballard
1990	To Be Continued...	Elton John	keyboards, synthesizer and string arrangements on "Made for Me"
1990	Simple Mission	Glass Tiger	string arrangements on "Where Did Our Love Go"
1991	It's Your Life	Gardner Cole	Producer, keyboards, synthesizer
1991	The Fire Inside	Bob Seger & The Silver Bullet Band	Synthesizer and strings on "The Real Love"
1992	Start the Car	Jude Cole	Producer, keyboards, synthesizer, Co-writer of "Tell the Truth"
1992	The Radical Light	Vonda Shepard	Synth string arrangements on "Clean Rain"
1993	American Matador	Marc Bonilla	Keyboards, acoustic piano, orchestration on American Matador track
1994	Look What Love Has Done	Patty Smyth	Producer, keyboards, synthesizer
1995	One Clear Voice	Peter Cetera	Co-writer and keyboards on "The Lucky Ones"
1995	A Spanner in the Works	Rod Stewart	Producer and keyboards on "Leave Virginia Alone"
1995	Feel The Healing	Pamela Thum	Co-writer and synth strings on "The Other Side"
1996	If We Fall in Love Tonight	Rod Stewart	Producer (both tracks) and keyboards on "Sometimes When We Touch", co-writer of "For the First Time" with Allan Rich and Jud Friedman
1997	The Other Side	Wynonna Judd	Co-writer of "Why Now" with David Pack and Cliff Downs
1997	The Heart of Chicago 1967–1997	Chicago	Producer, keyboards, string arrangements and co-writer of "Here in My Heart" with Glen Ballard

== Film ==
=== 1980s ===
Year	Title	Director	Studio(s)	Notes
1984	Dune	David Lynch	Dino De Laurentiis Corporation; Universal Pictures	Film scoring debut Composed with David Paich – Howard co-wrote cue "Trip to Arrakis"
1985	Head Office	Ken Finkleman	HBO Pictures; TriStar Pictures	Composed with Alan Howarth
1986	Wildcats	Michael Ritchie	Warner Bros.	Soundtrack released by Warner Bros. Records with songs co-written by Howard and one score cue with Hawk Wolinski
1986	8 Million Ways to Die	Hal Ashby	Producers Sales Organization; TriStar Pictures	—N/a
1986	Tough Guys	Jeff Kanew	Touchstone Pictures; Silver Screen Partners II; The Bryna Company	—N/a
1986	Nobody's Fool	Evelyn Purcell	Island Pictures	—N/a
1987	Campus Man	Ron Casden	RKO Pictures; Paramount Pictures	—N/a
1987	Five Corners	Tony Bill	HandMade Films; Cineplex Odeon Films	Soundtrack released by Varèse Sarabande; First score by Howard to have an album release
1987	Russkies	Rick Rosenthal	New Century Vista Film Company	Soundtrack released by Varèse Sarabande
1987	Promised Land	Michael Hoffman	Vestron Pictures	Soundtrack released by Private Music
1988	Off Limits	Christopher Crowe	20th Century Fox	Soundtrack released by Varèse Sarabande
1988	Some Girls	Michael Hoffman	United Artists; Metro-Goldwyn-Mayer	—N/a
1988	Everybody's All-American	Taylor Hackford	Warner Bros.	Soundtrack released by Capitol Records with one song co-written by Howard; no score included
1989	Tap	Nick Castle	TriStar Pictures	Soundtrack released by Epic Records with one song co-written by Howard; no score included
1989	Major League	David S. Ward	Morgan Creek Productions; Paramount Pictures	Soundtrack released by Curb Records with two songs co-written by Howard and two score cues
1989	The Package	Andrew Davis	Orion Pictures	Soundtrack released by Prometheus Records

=== 1990s ===
Year	Title	Director	Studio(s)	Notes
1990	Coupe de Ville	Joe Roth	Morgan Creek Productions; Universal Pictures	—N/a
1990	Pretty Woman	Garry Marshall	Touchstone Pictures; Silver Screen Partners IV	Cue "She Rescues Him Right Back" written by Thomas Pasatieri; Soundtrack released by EMI America; no score included
1990	Flatliners	Joel Schumacher	Columbia Pictures	Soundtrack released by Intrada Records
1990	Marked for Death	Dwight H. Little	Steamroller Productions; 20th Century Fox	Soundtrack released by Delicious Vinyl with one score cue
1990	Three Men and a Little Lady	Emile Ardolino	Touchstone Pictures; Interscope Communications	Soundtrack released by Hollywood Records with 20 minutes of score
1991	King Ralph	David S. Ward	Universal Pictures	—N/a
1991	Guilty by Suspicion	Irwin Winkler	Warner Bros.	Soundtrack released by Varèse Sarabande with 13 minutes of score End title song composed with Alan and Marilyn Bergman; One of the few James Newton Howard film scores to be conducted by the composer
1991	Dying Young	Joel Schumacher	20th Century Fox	Soundtrack released by Arista Records with 28 minutes of score
1991	The Man in the Moon	Robert Mulligan	Metro-Goldwyn-Mayer	Soundtrack released by Reprise Records
1991	My Girl	Howard Zieff	Imagine Entertainment; Columbia Pictures	Soundtrack released by Columbia Records with one score cut
1991	Grand Canyon	Lawrence Kasdan	20th Century Fox	Soundtrack released by Milan; Expanded edition later released by La-La Land Records
1991	The Prince of Tides	Barbra Streisand	Columbia Pictures	Replaced John Barry; Soundtrack released by Columbia Records with 44 minutes of score Includes song co-written by Howard and performed by Barbra Streisand not used in the film Nominated: Academy Award for Best Original Score
1992	Diggstown	Michael Ritchie	Metro-Goldwyn-Mayer	Soundtrack released by Varèse Sarabande; conducted by Howard
1992	Glengarry Glen Ross	James Foley	New Line Cinema; LIVE Entertainment (US); Rank Organisation (International)	Soundtrack released by Elektra with just over 16 minutes of score; conducted by Howard
1992	American Heart	Martin Bell	Triton Pictures	Independent film
1992	Night and the City	Irwin Winkler	20th Century Fox	Soundtrack released by Hollywood Records with two songs co-written by Howard and one score cue
1993	Alive	Frank Marshall	The Kennedy/Marshall Company; Touchstone Pictures (US/Canada); Paramount Pictures (International)	Soundtrack released by Hollywood Records; 2-CD expansion released by Intrada Records
1993	Falling Down	Joel Schumacher	Le Studio Canal+ Regency Enterprises; Warner Bros.	Replaced Graeme Revell; Soundtrack released by Intrada Records
1993	Dave	Ivan Reitman	Northern Lights Entertainment; Warner Bros.	Soundtrack released by Big Screen Records – cover erroneously credits Howard as the conductor (score actually conducted by Marty Paich); expanded edition later released by La-La Land
1993	The Fugitive	Andrew Davis	Warner Bros.	Soundtrack released by Elektra; complete score later released by La-La Land Records Nominated: Academy Award for Best Original Score
1993	The Saint of Fort Washington	Tim Hunter	Warner Bros.	Soundtrack released by Varèse Sarabande
1994	Intersection	Mark Rydell	Paramount Pictures	Soundtrack released by Milan Records; complete score later released by Quartet Records
1994	Wyatt Earp	Lawrence Kasdan	Tig Productions; Kasdan Pictures; Warner Bros.	Soundtrack released by Warner Bros. Records; complete score later released by La-La Land Records
1994	Junior	Ivan Reitman	Northern Lights Entertainment; Universal Pictures	Soundtrack released by Varèse Sarabande Nominated: Academy Award for Best Original Song (for "Look What Love Has Done"); Golden Globe Award for Best Original Song (for "Look What Love Has Done")
1995	Just Cause	Arne Glimcher	Warner Bros.	Soundtrack released by Varèse Sarabande
1995	Outbreak	Wolfgang Petersen	Warner Bros.	Soundtrack and subsequent 2-CD expansion released by Varèse Sarabande
1995	French Kiss	Lawrence Kasdan	PolyGram Filmed Entertainment; Working Title Films; 20th Century Fox	Soundtrack released by Mercury Records with one score cue
1995	Waterworld	Kevin Reynolds	Gordon Company; Davis Entertainment; Licht/Mueller Film Corporation; Universal Pictures	Replaced Mark Isham (who did only demos; his music box melody remains in the movie); Soundtrack released by MCA; complete score later released by La-La Land Records
1995	Restoration	Michael Hoffman	Miramax Films	Soundtrack released by Milan Records with 44 minutes of score
1996	Eye for an Eye	John Schlesinger	Paramount Pictures	Soundtrack released by La-La Land Records
1996	The Juror	Brian Gibson	Columbia Pictures	Replaced John Barry
1996	Primal Fear	Gregory Hoblit	Rysher Entertainment; Paramount Pictures	Soundtrack released by Milan Records with 28 1/2 minutes of score; complete score later released by La-La Land Records
1996	The Trigger Effect	David Koepp	Amblin Entertainment; Gramercy Pictures (US/Canada); Universal Pictures (International)	—N/a
1996	The Rich Man's Wife	Amy Holden Jones	Hollywood Pictures; Caravan Pictures; Roger Birnbaum Productions	Theme only; score by John Frizzell
1996	Space Jam	Joe Pytka	Northern Lights Entertainment; Courtside Seats Productions; Warner Bros. Feature Animation; Warner Bros. Family Entertainment	Separate score and song albums released by Atlantic Records; Song album includes one track co-written by Howard
1996	One Fine Day	Michael Hoffman	Lynda Obst Productions; 20th Century Fox	Soundtrack released by Columbia Records with a song co-written by Howard and one score suite Nominated: Academy Award for Best Original Song (for "For the First Time"); Golden Globe Award for Best Original Song (for "For the First Time"); Grammy Award for Best Song Written Specifically for a Motion Picture or for Television (for "For the First Time")
1997	Dante's Peak	Roger Donaldson	Pacific Western Productions; Universal Pictures	Theme and some cues; majority of score by John Frizzell; Soundtrack and subsequent 2-CD expansion released by Varèse Sarabande
1997	Liar Liar	Tom Shadyac	Imagine Entertainment; Universal Pictures	Theme only; score by John Debney; Soundtrack released by MCA
1997	Fathers' Day	Ivan Reitman	Silver Pictures; Northern Lights Entertainment; Warner Bros.	—N/a
1997	My Best Friend's Wedding	P.J. Hogan	Zucker Brothers Productions; TriStar Pictures	Soundtrack released by Sony/Work with one score suite For Your Consideration promo with just over 24 minutes issued Nominated: Academy Award for Best Original Musical or Comedy Score
1997	The Devil's Advocate	Taylor Hackford	Regency Enterprises; Warner Bros.	Soundtrack released by TVT with just over 39 minutes of score
1997	The Postman	Kevin Costner	Tig Productions; Warner Bros.	Soundtrack released by Warner Bros. Records with just under 50 minutes of score
1998	A Perfect Murder	Andrew Davis	Kopelson Entertainment; Warner Bros.	Soundtrack released by Varèse Sarabande
1999	Runaway Bride	Garry Marshall	Lakeshore Entertainment; Interscope Communications; Paramount Pictures (US/Canada); Touchstone Pictures (International)	Soundtrack released by Sony; no score
1999	Stir of Echoes	David Koepp	Artisan Entertainment (US/Canada); 20th Century Fox (International)	Soundtrack released by Nettwerk with 17 1/2 minutes of score
1999	The Sixth Sense	M. Night Shyamalan	The Kennedy/Marshall Company; Barry Mendel Productions; Hollywood Pictures; Spyglass Entertainment	Replaced a yet unknown composer Soundtrack released by Varèse Sarabande
1999	Mumford	Lawrence Kasdan	Touchstone Pictures	Soundtrack released by Hollywood Records with just under 25 minutes of score
1999	Snow Falling on Cedars	Scott Hicks	The Kennedy/Marshall Company; Universal Pictures	Soundtrack released by Decca Records Nominated: Satellite Award for Best Original Score
1999	Wayward Son	Randall Harris	Avenue Pictures (International; The movie had no distributor in the United States)	Composed with Steve Porcaro

=== 2000s ===
Year	Title	Director	Studio(s)	Notes
2000	Dinosaur	Ralph Zondag; Eric Leighton	The Secret Lab; Walt Disney Feature Animation; Walt Disney Pictures	First score for an animated film. Soundtrack released by Walt Disney Records; 2-CD expansion released by Intrada Records Nominated: Annie Award Nominee for Individual Achievement for Music Score; Saturn Award for Best Music
2000	Unbreakable	M. Night Shyamalan	Barry Mendel Productions; Blinding Edge Pictures; Touchstone Pictures	Soundtrack released by Hollywood Records
2000	Vertical Limit	Martin Campbell	Columbia Pictures	Soundtrack released by Varèse Sarabande
2001	Atlantis: The Lost Empire	Gary Trousdale; Kirk Wise	Walt Disney Feature Animation; Walt Disney Pictures	Soundtrack released by Walt Disney Records; 73-minute FYC promo issued Nominated: Annie Award Nominee for Individual Achievement for Music Score; World Soundtrack Award for Best Original Song Written for a Film
2001	America's Sweethearts	Joe Roth	Revolution Studios; Columbia Pictures	Soundtrack released by Atlantic Records with one score suite
2002	Big Trouble	Barry Sonnenfeld	Touchstone Pictures	—N/a
2002	Signs	M. Night Shyamalan	The Kennedy/Marshall Company; Blinding Edge Pictures; Touchstone Pictures	Soundtrack released by Hollywood Records
2002	Unconditional Love	P.J. Hogan	New Line Cinema	—N/a
2002	The Emperor's Club	Michael Hoffman	Beacon Communications; Fine Line Features; Sidney Kimmel Entertainment; Universal Pictures	Soundtrack released by Varèse Sarabande
2002	Treasure Planet	John Musker; Ron Clements	Walt Disney Feature Animation; Walt Disney Pictures	Replaced Alan Silvestri; Soundtrack released by Walt Disney Records with about 47 1/2 minutes of score
2003	Dreamcatcher	Lawrence Kasdan	Castle Rock Entertainment; Village Roadshow Pictures; Warner Bros.	Soundtrack and subsequent 2-CD expansion released by Varèse Sarabande
2003	Peter Pan	P.J. Hogan	Revolution Studios; Red Wagon Productions; Allied Stars Ltd; Universal Pictures (US/Canada/Australia/UK); Columbia Pictures (International)	"Flying" later used in commercials for Disneyland Paris; 15th Anniversary's Anthem; Soundtrack released by Varèse Sarabande; 2-CD expansion released by Intrada Records
2004	Hidalgo	Joe Johnston	Casey Silver Productions; Touchstone Pictures	Soundtrack released by Hollywood Records
2004	The Village	M. Night Shyamalan	Blinding Edge Pictures; Touchstone Pictures	Soundtrack released by Hollywood Records Nominated: Academy Award for Best Original Score
2004	Collateral	Michael Mann	DreamWorks Pictures (US/Canada); Paramount Pictures (International)	Soundtrack released by Hip-O Records with three Howard cues Composed with Tom Rothrock and Antonio Pinto Complete score issued by Intrada Records
2005	The Interpreter	Sydney Pollack	Working Title Films; Mirage Enterprises; Universal Pictures	Soundtrack released by Varèse Sarabande
2005	Batman Begins	Christopher Nolan	DC Comics; Syncopy Inc. Legendary Pictures; Warner Bros.	Composed with Hans Zimmer; Soundtrack released by Warner Bros. Records Nominated: Saturn Award for Best Music; World Soundtrack Award for Best Original Soundtrack of the Year
2005	Magnificent Desolation: Walking on the Moon 3D	Mark Cowen	Playtone; IMAX	Theme only; score by Blake Neely
2005	King Kong	Peter Jackson	WingNut Films; Universal Pictures	Replaced Howard Shore; Soundtrack released by Decca Records Nominated: Golden Globe Award for Best Original Score; World Soundtrack Award for Best Original Soundtrack of the Year; World Soundtrack Award for Soundtrack Composer of the Year
2006	Freedomland	Joe Roth	Revolution Studios; Columbia Pictures	Soundtrack released by Varèse Sarabande; Composed with Mel Wesson
2006	RV	Barry Sonnenfeld	Relativity Media; Red Wagon Entertainment; Intermedia Films; Columbia Pictures	Composed with Stuart Michael Thomas and Blake Neely
2006	Lady in the Water	M. Night Shyamalan	Legendary Pictures; Blinding Edge Pictures; Warner Bros.	Soundtrack released by Decca Records
2006	Blood Diamond	Edward Zwick	Bedford Falls Productions; Virtual Studios; Initial Entertainment Group; Warner Bros.	Soundtrack released by Varèse Sarabande with 51 1/2 minutes of score Nominated: Grammy Award for Best Score Soundtrack for Visual Media
2007	The Lookout	Scott Frank	Spyglass Entertainment; Miramax Films	Soundtrack released by Hollywood Records as an iTunes exclusive Composed with Clay Duncan and Stuart Michael Thomas Nominated: Satellite Award for Best Original Score
2007	Michael Clayton	Tony Gilroy	Section Eight Productions; Mirage Enterprises; Castle Rock Entertainment; Warner Bros.	Soundtrack released by Varèse Sarabande Won: World Soundtrack Award for Soundtrack Composer of the Year; Nominated: Academy Award for Best Original Score
2007	I Am Legend	Francis Lawrence	Weed Road Pictures; Overbrook Entertainment; Heyday Films; Original Film; Village Roadshow Pictures; Warner Bros.	Soundtrack released by Varèse Sarabande Won: World Soundtrack Award for Soundtrack Composer of the Year
2007	The Water Horse: Legend of the Deep	Jay Russell	Revolution Studios; Walden Media; Beacon Communications; Columbia Pictures	Soundtrack released by Sony Classical with 46 minutes of score iTunes release includes 12 more minutes of score
2007	Charlie Wilson's War	Mike Nichols	Relativity Media; Participant Productions; Playtone; Universal Pictures	Replaced Ry Cooder; Soundtrack released by Varèse Sarabande; One track co-written by Gingger Shankar Won: World Soundtrack Award for Soundtrack Composer of the Year
2007	The Great Debaters	Denzel Washington	Harpo Productions; The Weinstein Company	Soundtrack released by Varèse Sarabande; Composed with Peter Golub
2008	Mad Money	Callie Khouri	Millennium Films; Overture Films	Composed with Marty Davich
2008	The Happening	M. Night Shyamalan	Spyglass Entertainment; Blinding Edge Pictures; UTV Motion Pictures; Dune Entertainment; 20th Century Fox	Soundtrack released by Varèse Sarabande
2008	The Dark Knight	Christopher Nolan	DC Comics; Syncopy Inc. Legendary Pictures; Warner Bros.	Soundtrack released by Warner Bros. Records in one-disc and two-disc editions Composed with Hans Zimmer Won: Grammy Award for Best Score Soundtrack for Visual Media; Saturn Award for Best Music; Nominated: Anthony Asquith Award for Best Film Music
2008	Youssou N'Dour: I Bring What I Love	Elizabeth Chai Vasarhelyi	Shadow Distribution (US theatrical); Oscilloscope Pictures (US home video)	Soundtrack released by Nonesuch with one score track Composed with Marty Davich
2008	Defiance	Edward Zwick	Bedford Falls Productions; Paramount Vantage	Soundtrack released by Sony Classical Records Nominated: Academy Award for Best Original Score; Golden Globe Award for Best Original Score
2009	Confessions of a Shopaholic	P.J. Hogan	Jerry Bruckheimer Films; Touchstone Pictures	Soundtrack released by Hollywood Records with one score suite
2009	Duplicity	Tony Gilroy	Relativity Media; Universal Pictures	Soundtrack released by Varèse Sarabande
2009	Wings Over the Rockies	Tod Williams	Holding Pictures	Short film. Music from the film Blood Diamond
2009	It's Complicated	Nancy Meyers	Relativity Media; Waverly Films; Dentsu; Universal Pictures	Some additional music with Hans Zimmer

=== 2010s ===
Year	Title	Director	Studio(s)	Notes
2010	Nanny McPhee and the Big Bang	Susanna White	Relativity Media; Working Title Films; StudioCanal; Universal Pictures	Took over from Thomas Newman (who left and did not do a score); Soundtrack released by Varèse Sarabande
2010	Salt	Phillip Noyce	Di Bonaventura Pictures; Rainmaker Digital Effects; Columbia Pictures	Soundtrack released by Madison Gate Records Nominated: Satellite Award for Best Original Score
2010	The Last Airbender	M. Night Shyamalan	Nickelodeon Movies; The Kennedy/Marshall Company; Blinding Edge Pictures; Paramount Pictures	Soundtrack released by Lakeshore Records
2010	Inhale	Baltasar Kormákur	IFC Films	—N/a
2010	Love & Other Drugs	Edward Zwick	Fox 2000 Pictures; Regency Enterprises; New Regency; Stuber Pictures; 20th Century Fox	—N/a
2010	The Tourist	Florian Henckel von Donnersmarck	GK Films; Spyglass Entertainment; StudioCanal; Columbia Pictures	Replaced Gabriel Yared; Soundtrack released by Varèse Sarabande (includes one track retained from Yared's discarded score)
2011	Larry Crowne	Tom Hanks	Playtone; StudioCanal; Universal Pictures	Soundtrack released by Rhino Records with one score track
2011	Water for Elephants	Francis Lawrence	Fox 2000 Pictures; Dune Entertainment; Ingenious Media; 20th Century Fox	Soundtrack released by Sony Classical Records Nominated: Satellite Award for Best Original Score
2011	The Green Hornet	Michel Gondry	Original Film; Columbia Pictures	Replaced Danny Elfman due to a scheduling conflict
2011	Gnomeo & Juliet	Kelly Asbury	Touchstone Pictures; Miramax Films (uncredited); Rocket Pictures; Arc Productions	Soundtrack released by Hollywood Records and Walt Disney Records; Composed with Chris P. Bacon
2011	Green Lantern	Martin Campbell	DC Entertainment; De Line Pictures; Warner Bros.	Soundtrack released by WaterTower Music
2012	Darling Companion	Lawrence Kasdan	Sony Pictures Classics (USA); Sierra/Affinity (International)	—N/a
2012	The Hunger Games	Gary Ross	Color Force; Lionsgate	Replaced Danny Elfman due to a scheduling conflict Score album released by Universal Republic
2012	Snow White and the Huntsman	Rupert Sanders	Roth Films; Universal Pictures	Soundtrack released by Universal Republic
2012	The Bourne Legacy	Tony Gilroy	Relativity Media; The Kennedy/Marshall Company; Captivate Entertainment; Universal Pictures	Soundtrack released by Varèse Sarabande/Back Lot Music Nominated: World Soundtrack Award for Film Composer of the Year; Original Bourne themes by John Powell
2013	After Earth	M. Night Shyamalan	Overbrook Entertainment; Blinding Edge Pictures; Relativity Media; Columbia Pictures	Soundtrack released by Varèse Sarabande Nominated: World Soundtrack Award for Film Composer of the Year
2013	The Hunger Games: Catching Fire	Francis Lawrence	Color Force; Lionsgate	Score album released by Universal Republic
2013	Parkland	Peter Landesman	American Film Company; Playtone; Exclusive Media Group	Soundtrack released by Rhino Records as a digital download Additional music by Sven Faulconer and Sunna Wehrmeijer
2014	Cut Bank	Matt Shakman	Kilburn Media; A24	—N/a
2014	Maleficent	Robert Stromberg	Roth Films; Walt Disney Pictures	Soundtrack released by Walt Disney Records
2014	Nightcrawler	Dan Gilroy	Bold Films; Open Road Films	Soundtrack released by Lakeshore Records
2014	Pawn Sacrifice	Edward Zwick	Bleecker Street	
2014	The Hunger Games: Mockingjay – Part 1	Francis Lawrence	Color Force; Lionsgate	Score album released by Universal Republic
2015	The Hunger Games: Mockingjay – Part 2	Francis Lawrence	Color Force; Lionsgate	Score album released by Universal Republic
2015	Concussion	Peter Landesman	Village Roadshow Pictures; Scott Free Productions; Columbia Pictures	Score album released by Sony Classical Records
2016	The Huntsman: Winter's War	Cedric Nicolas-Troyan	Universal Pictures; Perfect World Pictures	Score album released by Back Lot Music
2016	Fantastic Beasts and Where to Find Them	David Yates	Warner Bros.	Score album released by WaterTower Music Nominated: Saturn Award for Best Music; Hedwig's Theme by John Williams
2017	Detroit	Kathryn Bigelow	Annapurna Pictures; First Light Productions; Page 1	"Rescue" and "Alone" are two cues from the soundtrack of Detroit with various artists Additional music by Karen Han
2017	Roman J. Israel, Esq.	Dan Gilroy	Macro Media; Cross Creek Pictures; Columbia Pictures	Score album released by Sony Classical Records
2018	Red Sparrow	Francis Lawrence	20th Century Fox	Score album released by Sony Classical Records
2018	The Nutcracker and the Four Realms	Lasse Hallström; Joe Johnston	Walt Disney Pictures	Score conducted by Gustavo Dudamel; Score album released by Walt Disney Records
2018	Fantastic Beasts: The Crimes of Grindelwald	David Yates	Warner Bros.	Score album released by WaterTower Music Hedwig's Theme by John Williams
2019	A Hidden Life	Terrence Malick	Fox Searchlight Pictures	Score album released by Sony Classical Records

=== 2020s ===
Year	Title	Director	Studio(s)	Notes
2020	News of the World	Paul Greengrass	Universal Pictures	Score album released by Back Lot Music, a division of Universal Studios Music LLLP Nominated: Academy Award for Best Original Score; Golden Globe Award for Best Original Score; Anthony Asquith Award for Best Film Music
2021	Raya and the Last Dragon	Don Hall; Carlos López Estrada	Walt Disney Animation Studios; Walt Disney Pictures	—N/a
2021	Jungle Cruise	Jaume Collet-Serra	Walt Disney Pictures	—N/a
2022	Fantastic Beasts: The Secrets of Dumbledore	David Yates	Warner Bros.	Hedwig's Theme by John Williams
2023	Pain Hustlers	David Yates	Netflix	Composed with Michael Dean Parsons
2023	The Hunger Games: The Ballad of Songbirds & Snakes	Francis Lawrence	Lionsgate	Score album released by Sony Classical Records
2025	The Lost Bus	Paul Greengrass	Blumhouse Productions; Apple TV+	—N/a
2026	Marty, Life Is Short	Lawrence Kasdan	Netflix	Documentary film Composed with Xander Rodzinski
2026	Remain	M. Night Shyamalan	Warner Bros. Pictures; Blinding Edge Pictures	—N/a
2026	Behemoth!	Tony Gilroy	Searchlight Pictures	—N/a
2026	The Hunger Games: Sunrise on the Reaping	Francis Lawrence	Lionsgate	—N/a

== Television ==
Year	Title	Studio(s)	Notes
1988	Go Toward the Light	RHI Entertainment	Television film
1989	Men	ABC	TV series pilot and theme Nominated: Primetime Emmy Award for Outstanding Achievement in Main Title Theme Music
1990	The Image	Home Box Office	Television film
1990	Revealing Evidence: Stalking the Honolulu Strangler	MCA Television Entertainment	Television film
1990	Somebody Has to Shoot the Picture	Home Box Office; MCA Television Entertainment	Television film
1990	Descending Angel	Home Box Office	Television film
1992	A Private Matter	Mirage Enterprises; Home Box Office	Television film
1992	2000 Malibu Road	Spelling Television	TV series theme
1994	ER	Amblin Television; Warner Bros. Television	TV series theme and pilot score Soundtrack released by Atlantic Records with Howard's theme in TV and complete versions Nominated: Primetime Emmy Award for Outstanding Individual Achievement in Main Title Theme Music
1996	The Sentinel	Paramount Network Television	TV series theme only; scores by Steve Porcaro and John M. Keane; Soundtrack released by Sonic Images with Howard's theme in main and end title versions
1998	From the Earth to the Moon	Home Box Office	Score for part 6: "Mare Tranquilitatis"; Soundtrack released by Epic Soundtrax with period pop songs and Michael Kamen's opening and closing theme music; no episode scores
2000	Gideon's Crossing	Heel and Toe Films; Touchstone Television	TV series theme Won: Primetime Emmy Award for Outstanding Individual Achievement in Main Title Theme Music
2016	All the Way	Amblin Entertainment; HBO Films	Nominated: Primetime Emmy Award for Outstanding Music Composition for a Limited Series, Movie or a Special (Original Dramatic Score)
2017	A Series of Unfortunate Events	Netflix; Paramount Television; What is the Question? Sonnenfeld Productions, Inc.	TV series Scored 5 episodes Nominated: Primetime Emmy Award for Outstanding Music Composition for a Series (Original Dramatic Score) (for "A Bad Beginning")
2020	Emily in Paris	Netflix; MTV Entertainment Studios; Jax Media; Darren Star Productions	TV series theme
2022	Light & Magic	Disney+ Lucasfilm; Imagine Documentaries; Kasdan Pictures	Documentary miniseries Nominated: Primetime Emmy Award for Outstanding Music Composition for a Documentary Series or Special (Original Dramatic Score) (for "Gang of Outsiders ")
2022	Willow	Disney+ Lucasfilm; Imagine Television; MGM Television	Composed with Xander Rodzinski; Original "Willow" Themes by James Horner
2023	All the Light We Cannot See	Netflix; 21 Laps Entertainment	TV mini-series Scored all 4 episodes Nominated: Primetime Emmy Award for Outstanding Music Composition for a Limited or Anthology Series, Movie or Special (Original Dramatic Score) (for "Episode 4")

== Other work ==
Year	Title	Notes
1993	Savoy Pictures ID	Logo theme
2001	Revolution Studios ID	Logo theme
2003	Cheyenne Enterprises ID	Logo theme
2006	Sony Pictures Animation ID	Logo theme
2010	Legendary Pictures ID	Logo theme
2011	FilmDistrict ID	Logo theme

== See also ==
- List of film director and composer collaborations
