= Look What Love Has Done =

1994 song by Patty Smyth

Single by Patty Smyth
- Released: November 1994
- Length: 4:05 (single version)
- Label: MCA
- Songwriters: Carole Bayer Sager; James Ingram; James Newton Howard; Patty Smyth
- Producer: James Newton Howard

Patty Smyth singles chronology
"Shine" (1993)	"Look What Love Has Done" (1994)	"Broken" (2015)

"Look What Love Has Done" is a song by American singer Patty Smyth, released in November 1994 as the theme song to the American comedy film Junior. It was written by Carole Bayer Sager, James Ingram, James Newton Howard and Smyth, and was produced by Howard.

The song was nominated for Academy and Golden Globe Awards. It also achieved chart success in the US and Canada, reaching number 6 on the US Billboard Bubbling Under Hot 100 and number 21 on the RPM Top 100 Singles charts.

== Critical reception ==
Upon its release as a single, Larry Flick of Billboard praised "Look What Love Has Done" as a "sweet pop ballad" that "shift[s] from a stock piano-vocal opening to a softly percussive, rocking groove". He noted Smyth "brings a worldly, empathetic quality to a lyric that might sound schmaltzy in lesser hands" and believed the single "maintains a youthful top 40 tone while keeping options for AC play wide open". Pan-European magazine Music & Media commented, "Look what a medical experimente can do, would be a better title. The theme song to Junior is just a normal film ballad (but not as kitschy)."

== Awards ==
The song was nominated for the Golden Globe Award for Best Original Song at the 52nd Golden Globe Awards in January 1995 and for the Academy Award for Best Original Song at the 67th Academy Awards in March 1995.

== Track listing ==
Cassette and CD single (US)

1. "Look What Love Has Done" (single version) – 4:05
2. "Look What Love Has Done" (instrumental) – 4:28

CD single (Germany)

1. "Look What Love Has Done" (single version) – 4:05
2. "Look What Love Has Done" (instrumental) – 4:28
3. "Sometimes Love Just Ain't Enough" – 4:27

== Personnel ==
Production

- James Newton Howard – production
- Chris Lord-Alge – recording, mixing

== Charts ==
Chart (1995)	Peak position
Canada Top Singles (RPM)	21
Canada Adult Contemporary (RPM)	10
Iceland (Íslenski Listinn Topp 40)	10
US Bubbling Under Hot 100 (Billboard)	6
US Adult Contemporary (Billboard)	23
