= Junior (1994 film) =

Film by Ivan Reitman

- Theatrical release poster
- Directed by: Ivan Reitman
- Written by: Kevin Wade; Chris Conrad
- Produced by: Ivan Reitman
- Starring: Arnold Schwarzenegger; Danny DeVito; Emma Thompson; Frank Langella; Pamela Reed
- Cinematography: Adam Greenberg
- Edited by: Wendy Greene Bricmont; Sheldon Kahn
- Music by: James Newton Howard
- Production company: Northern Lights Entertainment
- Distributed by: Universal Pictures
- Release date: November 23, 1994
- Running time: 109 minutes
- Country: United States
- Language: English
- Budget: $60 million
- Box office: $108.4 million

Junior is a 1994 American science fiction comedy film directed and produced by Ivan Reitman, and starring Arnold Schwarzenegger, Danny DeVito and Emma Thompson. The film follows Alex Hesse, an Austrian-American scientist who agrees to undergo a male pregnancy from a newly developed drug Expectane. The film marked the third and last collaboration for Reitman and Schwarzenegger, succeeding Twins (1988) and Kindergarten Cop (1990), as well as the second and last collaboration for DeVito, Reitman, and Schwarzenegger, succeeding Twins.

The film was released in the United States the day before Thanksgiving by Universal Pictures on November 23, 1994, to mixed reception and did not match the box office performance of Reitman's earlier films starring Schwarzenegger: Twins, which also starred DeVito and Schwarzenegger as a comedic duo, and Kindergarten Cop. Schwarzenegger and Thompson received Golden Globe Award nominations for their performances. The film's theme song, Patty Smyth's "Look What Love Has Done", was also recognized, going on to be nominated for the Academy Award for Best Original Song.

== Plot ==
Austrian research geneticist Dr. Alex Hesse and his OB/GYN colleague Dr. Larry Arbogast invent a fertility drug, "Expectane", designed to reduce the chances of a miscarriage. With the drug unapproved by the FDA, the colleagues are not authorized to test it and are unable to continue their research. Noah Banes, the director of the laboratory, informs Larry that while the FDA denied human experimentation, the team has received a donation from geneticist Dr. Diana Reddin from the ovum cryogenics department. Alex plans to start over in Europe, but Larry suggests they can still perform the experiment, with Canadian firm Lyndon Pharmaceutical offering to fund them provided they find a volunteer. Alex questions the likelihood of a pregnant woman taking an unapproved drug, but Larry suggests omitting the volunteer's gender and convinces him to impregnate himself with an ovum codenamed "Junior".

That night, Alex dreams his potential offspring has his own face. As weeks go by, he complains to Larry of morning sickness and sore nipples, and chats incessantly about walks, massages, and naps. Contemplating fatherhood after watching television commercials, Alex breaks down sobbing. When the time comes for Alex to end the experiment and release the results to Lyndon Pharmaceutical, he continues taking the drug as he has decided to carry the pregnancy to term; initially annoyed, Larry agrees to keep it hidden. Alex develops a relationship with Diana, and reveals his pregnancy to Angela, Larry's ex-wife, who also happens to be pregnant by Aerosmith's personal trainer.

Diana is stunned and angry when it is revealed that the "Junior" ovum is hers, and Banes attempts to take credit for the experiment. Disguised as a woman, Alex hides in a retreat for expectant mothers, blaming his masculine appearance on anabolic steroid use. Diana visits Alex at the resort and the two reconcile, telling each other it does not matter who is pregnant because she is the mother and he is the father. Larry reveals the experiment's data to Lyndon Pharmaceutical, who agree to partner with them.

Alex experiences abdominal pain from the start of labor, calling for Larry and Diana. As Diana rushes to the resort, Larry tells a fellow doctor to prepare for an emergency C-section. A janitor overhears and alerts Banes, who summons the media, hoping to take credit for the world's first pregnant man. Warned by his colleague, Larry distracts the press by arriving with Angela, discrediting Banes, who is fired by the university president, while Diana and Alex enter the hospital by the fire escape. Larry and his colleague take Alex away for his operation: sent to keep Angela company in the waiting room, Diana finds her in labor and becomes her delivery coach. Alex gives birth to a healthy baby girl, and Larry announces the arrival to Diana, who is assisting Angela with contractions. Diana leaves Angela with Larry and rushes to see the baby, whom she and Alex name Junior. Larry delivers Angela's child and they reconcile to raise the boy, Jake, as their own.

One year later, the families all go on vacation together and celebrate the birthdays of Junior and Jake. Diana is pregnant with their second child, and Angela mentions wanting another baby but not wishing to endure pregnancy again; at Alex's suggestion, they all try to convince a reluctant Larry to carry the child.

== Cast ==
- Arnold Schwarzenegger as Dr. Alexander "Alex" Hesse, Austrian research geneticist who impregnates himself with Junior's ovum.
- Danny DeVito as Dr. Larry Arbogast, Alex's OB/GYN colleague and the father of Jake.
- Emma Thompson as Dr. Diana Reddin, British cryogenics expert and the mother of Junior.
- Frank Langella as Noah Banes, director of the laboratory and head of the review board.
- Pamela Reed as Angela, Larry's former wife and the mother of Jake.
- Aida Turturro as Louise
- James Eckhouse as Ned Sneller
- Megan Cavanagh as Willow
- Welker White as Jenny
- Kathleen Chalfant as Casitas Madres receptionist #1
- Anna Gunn as Casitas Madres receptionist #2
- Merle Kennedy as Samantha
- Judy Collins as Naomi
- Stefan Gierasch as Edward Sawyer
- Tom Dugan as Lobster Man

Christopher Meloni makes a minor appearance as a patient at Larry's office. John Pinette has a minor appearance as a clothing store salesman who helps dress a heavily pregnant Alex. Cassandra Wilson makes a cameo as a singer at a formal event where Alex and Diana share a dance, performing "I've Got You Under My Skin". Brianne and Brittany McConnell (b.20 August 1993) who are identical twins, played Junior, Alex and Diana's infant daughter.

== Production ==
Originally developed under the title of Oh Baby, the film was announced during production of Reitman's Dave as a reteam for him and Schwarzenegger.

Executive producer Beverly J. Camhe and writers Kevin Wade and Chris Conrad wrote the script together in 1990 over the course of just under a year with the central concept of "What if men could have babies?" stemming from their experience in Jungian therapy as a possible way of reconciling Yin and yang. The two shopped the script around to various potential leads, but in many cases agents outright refused to give it to their clients and several who did were allegedly disgusted with the concept. Mel Gibson came close to signing on for the role, but pulled out after learning of his church's stance on the material. Woody Harrelson also responded well to the script, but the studio didn't think he had enough clout to carry audience interest. Andrew Dice Clay's agent also called regarding the script suggesting it could be a good revenge fantasy for those who took umbrage with Clay's misogynistic humor, but Wade and Conrad shot down this idea as they didn't want schadenfreude to color the movie. When the project made its way to Schwarzenegger, both he and his then wife Maria Shriver loved the script and were instrumental in getting the film set up.

Thompson signed to star in February 1994, following her Academy Award nominations for The Remains of the Day and In the Name of the Father.

== Reception ==
=== Box office ===
Following the successful collaborations between Schwarzenegger and Reitman on Twins (1988) which grossed $217 million worldwide and Kindergarten Cop (1990) which grossed $202 million, Variety's Leonard Klady predicted that the film, which opened the day before Thanksgiving, would be the biggest of the season. The film was the biggest to open over the Thanksgiving weekend with a gross of $10 million in 3 days, but only placed fourth overall for the weekend with just half the gross of The Santa Clause. In North America, the film did not perform as expected and only grossed slightly more than half its budget ($37 million vs. $60 million) but grossed a total of $108 million worldwide.

=== Critical response ===
Rotten Tomatoes gave the film a 39% approval rating with an average score of 5/10, based on 36 collected reviews. The critical consensus reads: "Even with an abundance of talent behind and in front of the camera, Junior doesn't quite deliver enough laughs to nurse its zany high-concept idea." On Metacritic, it has a weighted average score of 59% based on reviews from 25 critics, indicating "mixed or average" reviews. Audiences polled by CinemaScore gave the film an average grade of "B+" on an A+ to F scale.

Roger Ebert was a fan of the film, giving it 3½ out of four stars and maintaining that: "I know this sounds odd, but Schwarzenegger is perfect for the role. Observe his acting carefully in Junior, and you'll see skills that many 'serious' actors could only envy." On the television show At the Movies Ebert and Gene Siskel gave the film "two thumbs up". Variety wrote: "What separates this straightforward chuckler from the pack is its shrewd reliance on character rather than plot, and that human dimension proves surprisingly poignant."

Comedian and former Mystery Science Theater 3000 host Michael J. Nelson named the film the second-worst comedy ever made.

=== Accolades ===
Award	Category	Nominee(s)	Result
Academy Awards	Best Original Song	"Look What Love Has Done"; Music and Lyrics by Carole Bayer Sager, James Newton Howard, James Ingram and Patty Smyth	Nominated
American Comedy Awards	Funniest Supporting Actor in a Motion Picture	Emma Thompson	Nominated
Golden Globe Awards	Best Actor in a Motion Picture – Musical or Comedy	Arnold Schwarzenegger	Nominated
Golden Globe Awards	Best Actress in a Motion Picture – Musical or Comedy	Emma Thompson	Nominated
Golden Globe Awards	Best Original Song – Motion Picture	"Look What Love Has Done"; Music and Lyrics by Carole Bayer Sager, James Newton Howard, James Ingram and Patty Smyth	Nominated

=== Year-end lists ===
- Top 3 Runner-ups (not ranked) – Sandi Davis, The Oklahoman
- Honorable mention – Glenn Lovell, San Jose Mercury News
- Honorable mention – Michael MacCambridge, Austin American-Statesman

== See also ==
- List of American films of 1994
- Rabbit Test (1978), a comedy film with a similar premise, starring Billy Crystal.
- A Slightly Pregnant Man (1973), an earlier French film by Jacques Demy, with Marcello Mastroianni playing the man who becomes pregnant.
- Thomas Beatie (also known as "The Pregnant Man"), an American trans man who became pregnant.
- He's Expecting, a Japanese manga that takes place in a future where male pregnancy is a semi-common occurrence.
- The Pregnant, a Russian comedy film with a similar premise.
- Biosphere (2022), starring Mark Duplass and Sterling K. Brown.
