= Never Enough (Patty Smyth album) =

Studio album by Patty Smyth
- Released: 1987
- Recorded: 1986
- Genre: Rock
- Length: 41:04
- Label: Columbia
- Producer: Rick Chertoff; William Wittman

Patty Smyth chronology
Warrior (1984)	Never Enough (1987)	Patty Smyth (1992)

Singles from Never Enough
- 1. "Never Enough" Released: February 1987; 2. "Downtown Train" Released: May 1987; 3. "Isn't It Enough" Released: August 1987

Professional ratings
Review scores
Source	Rating
AllMusic	3/5 stars
Robert Christgau	B−

Never Enough is the debut album by former Scandal singer Patty Smyth. It was released in 1987 on Columbia Records (also the group's label) three years after the band's breakup in 1984.

== Content ==
On The Bloomberg Report, Smyth said the album "was never supposed to be a solo record; it was meant to be a record by Scandal Featuring Patty Smyth. Even though the band had broken up, I was still with Keith Mack; it was Zack and I that had ended our partnership."

Though she would later have success as a songwriter, Smyth cowrote only the album's first and last tracks. The first – the title track – was a slight rewrite of a song of the same title from the self-titled debut album of then-current (in 1987) Hooters bandmembers Rob Hyman and Eric Bazilian's former band, Baby Grand. The original version featured different lyrics sung by Baby Grand frontman David Kagan. Hyman and Bazilian, as well as others associated with The Hooters, including producer Rick Chertoff, had a significant hand in the making of this album.

The album includes three cover versions. "Downtown Train", by Tom Waits, was covered that same year by country singer-songwriter Mary Chapin Carpenter for her album Hometown Girl and later in 1989 by Rod Stewart and included on his 1989 box set Storyteller. "Call To Heaven" was originally "Les Morts Dansant", from British hard rock band Magnum's 1985 album On a Storyteller's Night. "Isn't it Enough" was from Danny Wilde's 1986 release "The Boyfriend".

The LP peaked at 66 in the U.S. and spawned three singles: the title track (#61 pop, #4 U.S. Mainstream Rock Tracks), "Downtown Train" (#95 pop, #40 Mainstream) and "Isn't It Enough" (failed to chart on pop, #26 Mainstream).

The album was produced by William Wittman and Rick Chertoff. Chertoff was one of the people on the production team of Cyndi Lauper's She's So Unusual, and would work with platinum-selling singer-songwriter Joan Osborne on her 1995 album, Relish.

Musician reviewer J. D. Considine wrote simply: "In case you ever wondered what Eddie Money would have been like as a girl."

== Track listing ==
1. "Never Enough" (Rob Hyman, Eric Bazilian, Rick Chertoff, Patty Smyth, David Kagan) - 4:15
2. "Downtown Train" (Tom Waits) - 5:05
3. "Give It Time" (Rob Hyman, David Kagan) - 4:17
4. "Call to Heaven" (Tony Clarkin) - 5:06
5. "The River Cried" (Billy Steinberg, Tom Kelly) - 4:16
6. "Isn't It Enough" (Danny Wilde, Nick Trevisick) - 4:22
7. "Sue Lee" (Willie Nile, Chertoff) - 3:48
8. "Tough Love" (Nick Gilder, Duane Hitchings) - 4:54
9. "Heartache Heard 'Round the World" (Hyman, Bazilian, Chertoff, Smyth) - 4:54

== Production ==
- Rick Chertoff – producer
- William Wittman – producer
- John Agnello – engineer, mixing
- George Marino – mastering
- Norman Moore – art direction, design
- Gary Heery – photography
- Mark Spector Company, Inc. – management

== Personnel ==
- Patty Smyth – lead vocals
- Eric Bazilian – keyboards, guitars, backing vocals
- Rob Hyman – keyboards, backing vocals
- Ralph Schuckett – keyboards
- Richard Termini – keyboards
- Peter Wood – keyboards
- Rick DiFonzo – guitars
- Keith Mack – guitars
- William Wittman – guitars, backing vocals
- Tommy Conwell – guitar solo (6)
- Neil Jason – bass
- Anton Fig – drums, percussion
- Ray Spiegel – tabla
- David Sanborn – alto saxophone solo (2)
- Magic Dick – harmonica solo (3)
- John Agnello – backing vocals
- Ellison Chase – backing vocals
- Rory Dodd – backing vocals
- Andy King – backing vocals
- John Loeffler – backing vocals
- Kasim Sulton – backing vocals
- Eric Troyer – backing vocals
