= Patty Smyth (album) =

Studio album by Patty Smyth
- Released: August 18, 1992
- Recorded: 1991–1992
- Studio: A&M (Hollywood)
- Genre: Rock
- Length: 44:44
- Label: MCA
- Producer: Roy Bittan

Patty Smyth chronology
Never Enough (1987)	Patty Smyth (1992)	Greatest Hits (Featuring Scandal) (1998)

Singles from Patty Smyth
- 1. "Sometimes Love Just Ain't Enough" Released: August 1992; 2. "No Mistakes" Released: December 1992; 3. "I Should Be Laughing" Released: 1993; 4. "Shine" Released: 1993

Patty Smyth is the second solo studio album by rock singer-songwriter Patty Smyth, formerly of Scandal; it went gold as a result of the popularity of its first single, "Sometimes Love Just Ain't Enough", which peaked at number two on the Billboard Hot 100 and also went gold. The album also produced three further singles in the opening track "No Mistakes" (top 40), then another minor hit with "I Should Be Laughing" (top 100), and finally "Shine".

== Reception ==
Professional ratings
Review scores
Source	Rating
AllMusic	2/5 stars

Brian Mansfield of AllMusic gave the disc two stars, saying that "it's not as good as (previous album) Never Enough.

== Track listing ==
1. "No Mistakes" (Patty Smyth, Kevin Savigar) – 5:23
2. "Too Much Love" (Michael Lunn, Sam Lorber) – 3:54
3. "Make Me a Believer" (Jesse Harms) – 4:38
4. "Sometimes Love Just Ain't Enough" with Don Henley (Smyth, Glen Burtnik) – 4:28
5. "Out There" (Smyth, Edward Roynesdal) – 4:46
6. "River of Love" (Smyth, Burtnik) – 4:23
7. "My Town" (Smyth, Savigar) – 4:07
8. "Shine" (Smyth, Burtnik) – 4:27
9. "One Moment to Another" (Jon Dee Graham) – 3:34
10. "I Should Be Laughing" (Smyth, Burtnik) – 5:04

== Production ==
=== Musicians ===
- Patty Smyth – lead vocals
- Roy Bittan – keyboards
- Rusty Anderson – guitars
- Tim Pierce – guitars
- Jimmy Rip – guitars
- John Pierce – bass
- Kenny Aronoff – drums, percussion
- Sheryl Crow – backing vocals
- Susie Davis – backing vocals
- Gia Ciambotti – backing vocals
- Kipp Lennon – backing vocals
- Arnold McCuller – backing vocals
- Róbert Molnár – backing vocals
- Terry Young – backing vocals
- Don Henley – harmony and lead vocals (4)
- Ruby's Class – children's choir (5)

=== Technical Personnel ===
- Roy Bittan – producer
- Rob Jacobs – engineer, mixing
- Brian Scheuble – assistant engineer, mix assistant
- John Aguto – additional engineer
- Nick DiDia – additional engineer
- Dave Collins – mastering
- Susan Dodes – A&R direction
- Vartan Kurjian – art direction
- Andy Engel – design
- Randee St. Nicholas – photography

== Charts ==
Chart performance for Patty Smyth
Chart (1992)	Peak position
Australian Albums (ARIA)	94
German Albums (Offizielle Top 100)	88
US Billboard 200	47

== Certifications ==
Region	Certification	Certified units/sales
United States (RIAA)	Gold	500,000^{^}
^{^} Shipments figures based on certification alone.
