= Sometimes Love Just Ain't Enough =

1992 single by Patty Smyth and Don Henley

Single by Patty Smyth and Don Henley

from the album Patty Smyth
- B-side: "Out There"
- Released: July 1992
- Genre: Rock
- Length: 4:28
- Label: MCA
- Songwriters: Patty Smyth; Glen Burtnik
- Producer: Roy Bittan

Patty Smyth singles chronology
"Isn't It Enough" (1987)	"Sometimes Love Just Ain't Enough" (1992)	"No Mistakes" (1992)

Don Henley singles chronology
"New York Minute" (1990)	"Sometimes Love Just Ain't Enough" (1992)	"Walkaway Joe" (1992)

"Sometimes Love Just Ain't Enough" is a duet between American singers Patty Smyth and Don Henley. The rock ballad was written by Smyth and Glen Burtnik and was released as a single in July 1992 by MCA Records. It reached No. 1 in Canada, where it was the most successful single of 1992, and peaked at No. 2 in both the United States and Ireland.

== History ==
Smyth is the lead singer for the band Scandal, whose hits included "The Warrior" and "Goodbye to You"; Henley is a longtime member of the Eagles (singing lead vocals on "Desperado", "Hotel California", among many others) as well as a successful solo artist ("The Boys of Summer", "Dirty Laundry"). Smyth had previously provided backing vocals on Henley's solo albums Building the Perfect Beast (1984) and The End of the Innocence (1989). "Sometimes Love Just Ain't Enough" was written by Smyth and Glen Burtnik and would appear on her self-titled 1992 album.

== Reception ==
The single was certified gold by the Recording Industry Association of America (RIAA) and spent six weeks at No. 2 on the US Billboard Hot 100 chart in late 1992. It remained in the top 40 for 20 weeks. The duet also topped the Billboard Adult Contemporary for four weeks. In Canada, "Sometimes Love Just Ain't Enough" spent seven weeks at No. 1 on the RPM 100 Hit Tracks chart, becoming the best-performing single of 1992, while in the United Kingdom, the song reached No. 22 on the UK Singles Chart. In Ireland, it reached number two. The song was nominated for a Grammy Award in the category Best Pop Vocal, Duo or Group.

== Charts ==
=== Weekly charts ===
Chart (1992)	Peak position
Australia (ARIA)	5
Austria (Ö3 Austria Top 40)	28
Belgium (Ultratop 50 Flanders)	47
Canada Top Singles (RPM)	1
Canada Adult Contemporary (RPM)	2
Europe (Eurochart Hot 100)	36
Europe (European Hit Radio)	5
Germany (GfK)	51
Ireland (IRMA)	2
Netherlands (Dutch Top 40 Tipparade)	4
Netherlands (Single Top 100)	49
New Zealand (Recorded Music NZ)	18
Norway (VG-lista)	9
Panama (UPI)	5
Sweden (Sverigetopplistan)	33
UK Singles (Official Charts)	22
UK Airplay (Music Week)	11
US Billboard Hot 100	2
US Adult Contemporary (Billboard)	1
US Pop Airplay (Billboard)	1
US Cash Box Top 100	2

=== Year-end charts ===
Chart (1992)	Position
Australia (ARIA)	23
Brazil (Crowley)	53
Canada Top Singles (RPM)	1
Canada Adult Contemporary (RPM)	10
Europe (European Hit Radio)	32
US Billboard Hot 100	22
US Adult Contemporary (Billboard)	13
US Cash Box Top 100	26

== Certifications ==
Region	Certification	Certified units/sales
Australia (ARIA)	Gold	35,000^{^}
^{^} Shipments figures based on certification alone.

== Release history ==
Region	Date	Format(s)	Label(s)	Ref.
United States	July 1992	7-inch vinyl; CD; cassette	MCA	
Australia	August 31, 1992	CD; cassette	MCA	
United Kingdom	September 21, 1992	7-inch vinyl; CD; cassette	MCA	

== Cover versions ==
- Filipino diva-actress Jennylyn Mercado revived it as a carrier single of her third album Love Is (2010).
- Singaporean singer Stefanie Sun also covered the song for her fourth album Start (2002).
- In 2013, country singer Travis Tritt and his daughter Tyler Reese recorded a version for the re-release of Tritt's album The Storm (2007). The re-released album was titled The Calm After... and released on Tritt's own Post Oak Records on July 9, 2013. Tritt's version was released as a single in June 2013.
- Dave Moffatt of The Moffatts recorded his version as a single in 2026.
