= White Mile =

- Genre: Action; Drama; Sport; Thriller
- Written by: Michael Butler
- Directed by: Robert Butler
- Starring: Alan Alda; Peter Gallagher; Robert Loggia
- Music by: Pray for Rain
- Country of origin: United States
- Original language: English

Production
- Executive producers: Dick Berg; Allan Marcil
- Producer: Anthony Santa Croce
- Production locations: South Fork American River; Placerville, California; Austin, Texas
- Cinematography: Lloyd Ahern II
- Editor: John Duffy
- Running time: 96 minutes
- Production companies: Stonehenge Productions; Viacom Productions; HBO Pictures

Original release
- Network: HBO
- Release: May 21, 1994

White Mile is a 1994 American made-for-television thriller-drama film directed by Robert Butler and starring Alan Alda, Peter Gallagher and Robert Loggia. It originally premiered on HBO on May 21, 1994.

== Plot summary ==
Dan Cutler, the head of an advertising agency, invites his colleagues to a whitewater rafting trip. The invitation feels more like an order to some of the executives, one of whom is decidedly fearful about going on the trip; Cutler considers the outing to be a test of his employees' confidence, courage and skills, and a way for them to regain their business swagger and confidence. Retired agency executive Nick Karas is a last minute addition; Cutler wants him to help secure some clients, and Nick believes that it is a simple fishing trip.

Tragedy occurs along Canada's "White Mile," when the inflatable carrying the large group capsizes, and all are swept away by the raging current. Two agency executives, retiree Nick Karas and two clients die. Later, Cutler becomes at odds with Jack Robbins, one of his top executives, over how the aftermath should be portrayed to authorities and to relatives who are suing the company.

== Cast ==
- Alan Alda as Dan Cutler
- Peter Gallagher as Jack Robbins
- Robert Loggia as Nick Karas
- Bruce Altman as David Koenig
- Fionnula Flanagan as Gena Karas
- Jack Gilpin as Peter Wiederhorn
- Ken Jenkins as Jerry Taggart
- Dakin Matthews as Andy Thornell
- Don McManus as Art Stefanoff
- Robert Picardo as Tom Horton
- Max Wright as Bill Spencer
- Brian Markinson as Marty Rosenstock
- Eric Magneson as Ed Miller
- Ken Thorley as Coroner Costello
- Rebecca Glenn as Diane Koenig
- Alice Barden as Stephanie
- Brett Porter as Mr. Bechdel
- Dan Kern as the Judge
- Ben Sparks as John McAlpine
- Jacqueline Kim as Michelle Stefanoff
- Gina Ravera as Alma
- Robin Goodrin Nordli as Leila

== Background ==
The film is loosely based on a rafting accident, on August 1, 1987, on the White Mile rapids in the Bidwell Canyon section of the Chilko River, in the Central Interior of British Columbia, Canada. Current and retired executives of Chicago agency DDB Needham (DDB), along with clients from Kraft, Clorox, Procter & Gamble (P&G), Drug Free America Foundation (DFAF) and other major companies, were involved in the incident. Actor Robert Loggia's character, Nick Karas, likely represents the real James Fasules, a retired DDB Needham executive who drowned in the river. Alan Alda's "hard-driving ad agency president," Dan Cutler, who's also responsible for initiating and organizing the wilderness excursion, is plainly modeled on the then-DDB Needham President Al Wolfe.

Besides drawing heavily on the Wolfe and Fasules' real personalities, the film's other characters are largely composites of the real men. The other lead character, Jack Robbins, portrayed by Peter Gallagher, is completely fictitious, according to Stonehenge Productions' Executive Producer, Dick Berg. Screenwriter Michael Butler said Al Wolfe didn't cooperate with the screenwriting process. A 35-page book proposal, by Chicago author and business journalist, Bob Tamarkin, served as principal source for the screenplay. HBO and Stonehenge Productions bought the movie rights to Tamarkin's proposal for a book on the tragedy. Shortly before the film premiered, Tamarkin said the manuscript was still incomplete, but he planned on completing it; Unfortunately the original publisher, a unit of Doubleday Books, had gone out of business. Like the film, five men died that day—two current and one retired DDB executives, and one executive each from P&G and DFAF. As in the film, the court assigned a payout of $1.1 million to the family of the retired DDB executive who died that day.

== Awards and honors ==
- The film was nominated for two Golden Globes: "Best Mini-Series or Motion Picture Made for TV" and Alan Alda was nominated for "Best Performance by an Actor in a Mini-Series or Motion Picture Made for TV"
- The film was nominated for an Emmy Award for "Outstanding Individual Achievement in Sound Editing for a Miniseries or a Special"
- John Duffy was nominated for an Eddie for "Best Edited Motion Picture for Non-Commercial Television"

== Soundtrack ==
- "The Song of the Marines" by Harry Warren and Al Dubin
