= Patty Smyth =

American singer (born 1957)

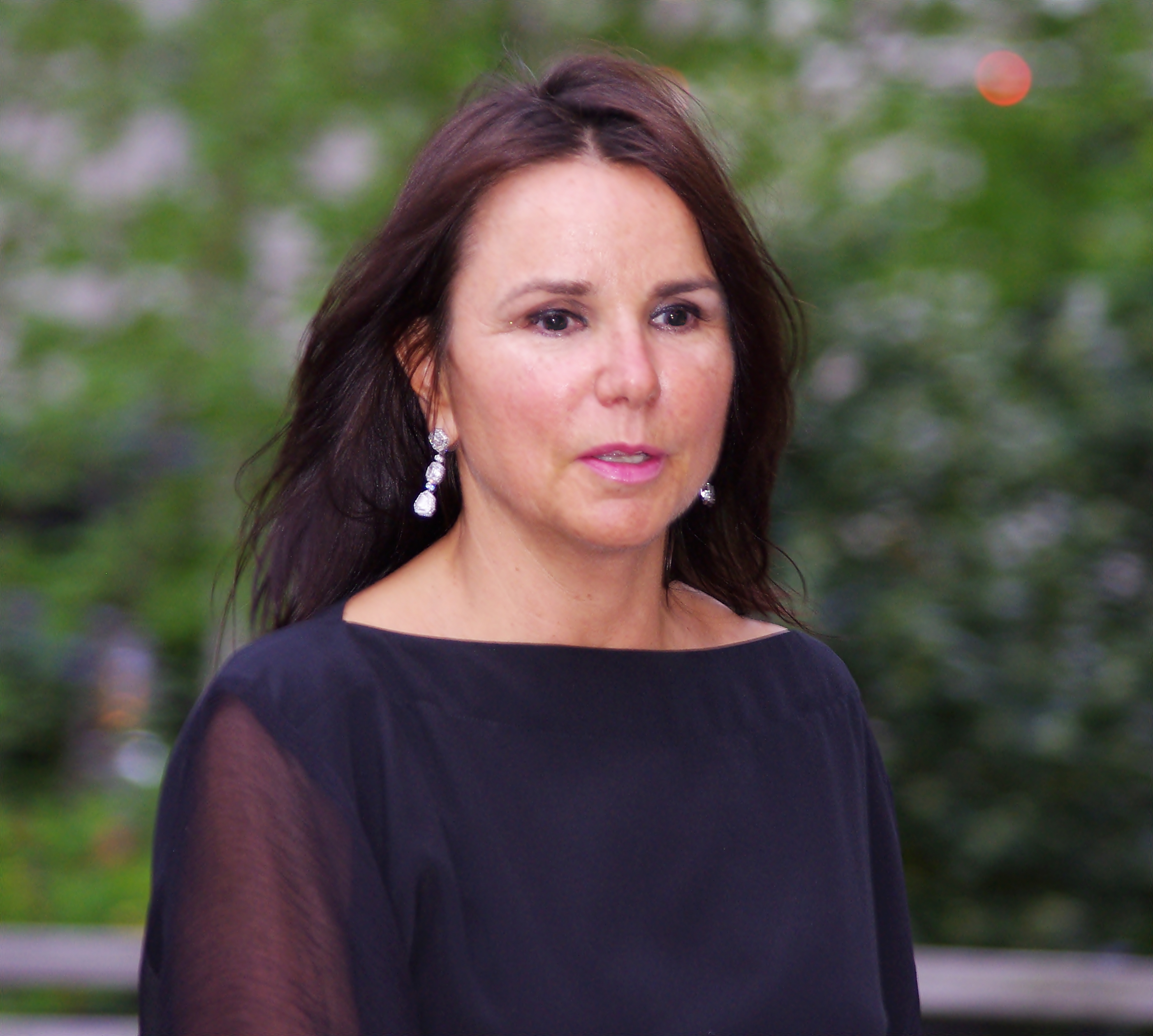
- Smyth in April 2011 during the Tribeca Film Festival Vanity Fair party

Background information
- Born: Patricia Smyth; June 26, 1957 (age 69); New York City, US
- Genres: Rock; pop rock; new wave
- Occupations: Singer; songwriter
- Years active: 1981–present
- Labels: Columbia; MCA
- Member of: Scandal
- Spouse: Richard Hell (m. 1985; div. 1986) John McEnroe (m. 1997)
- Website: pattysmythandscandal.com

Patricia Smyth (born June 26, 1957), also known as Patty Smyth-McEnroe, is an American singer and songwriter. She gained national attention as the lead vocalist of rock band Scandal and went on to record and perform as a solo artist. Her distinctive voice and new wave image gained broad exposure through video recordings aired on cable music video channels such as MTV. Her debut solo album Never Enough was well received, and generated a pair of Top 100 hits. In 1992, her hit single "Sometimes Love Just Ain't Enough," a duet with Don Henley of the Eagles, peaked at No. 2 on the Billboard Hot 100. She performed and co-wrote "Look What Love Has Done" with James Ingram for the 1994 film Junior. The work earned her a Grammy Award nomination for Best Song Written for Visual Media, as well as an Academy Award nomination for Best Original Song.

== Early life, family, and education ==
"Patty Smyth" was born Patricia Smyth on June 26, 1957, in New York City. She was raised in the Gerritsen Beach neighborhood of Brooklyn.

== Career ==
=== With Scandal ===
Smyth joined Scandal as lead vocalist in 1981. The following year, the band released the EP Scandal, featuring the song "Goodbye to You". The EP went on to become Columbia Records' biggest selling. In 1984, they put out their follow-up, Warrior. Buoyed by MTV airplay, the album peaked at No. 17 on the U.S. Billboard 200 chart, and the first song off the release, also titled "The Warrior," was a Top 10 hit. Despite their success, however, internal strife led the band to break up soon afterward.

=== Solo career ===
Following the end of Scandal, Smyth's friend Eddie Van Halen invited her to join his band Van Halen to replace departed lead singer David Lee Roth. Smyth, eight months pregnant at the time, declined the offer, saying "It was just not the right time for me." "I was a New Yorker, I didn't want to live in LA ... and those guys were drunk and fighting all the time". She appeared on the Hooters 1985 album Nervous Night on the song "Where Do the Children Go" as an accompanying vocalist.

Smyth released her first solo album, Never Enough, in 1987. It contained her version of the Tom Waits song "Downtown Train" (which Rod Stewart would make a hit three years later) and the title track "Never Enough," which was co-written with members of the Hooters and based on a song of the same title that Hooters members Eric Bazilian and Rob Hyman had written for their earlier band, Baby Grand. In 1988, she contributed the Diane Warren penned "I Run Right Back" to the Caddyshack II soundtrack. She put out another solo effort in 1992, the eponymous album Patty Smyth. Off of that effort, she secured a hit record via "Sometimes Love Just Ain't Enough," a duet with Don Henley of the Eagles. This peaked at No. 2 on the Billboard Hot 100, and was certified gold for sales of 500,000. The album, also certified gold, featured an additional US Top 40 hit with "No Mistakes" and also spawned the minor hit "I Should Be Laughing." Smyth had previously recorded with Henley as a backing singer on several songs on his albums Building the Perfect Beast and The End of the Innocence.

Smyth subsequently co-wrote the 1994 song "Look What Love Has Done," nominated for a Grammy and an Academy Award after its inclusion in the soundtrack to the feature film Junior. Further soundtrack commissions resulted in her writing and composing the theme tune, "Wish I Were You," to the 1998 feature film Armageddon. (Her husband, former tennis professional John McEnroe, claimed in his autobiography that she was inspired to write the song by his own attempt at a musical career; she was struck by his excitement at playing music, when her own feelings about the music industry were much more ambivalent.) In 1999, Smyth sang lead vocals on a cover of "Ode To Billie Joe" (the 1967 Bobbie Gentry hit) on the album Smokin' Section by Tom Scott & The L.A. Express.

In 2015, to promote the release of her Christmas album Come On December, she crowdfunded a campaign to support the Headstrong Project; all the money raised on the pre-orders of her album were designated to the non-profit. The album featured the single "Broken," and the music video for the single was released just before Veterans Day, and was filmed on the grounds of a Veterans of Foreign Wars chapter. The album was released on November 20, 2015.

=== Reunion with Scandal ===
In 2004, VH1 recruited Smyth and the surviving members of Scandal for a Bands Reunited episode, resulting in a small reunion tour of concerts on the East Coast of the United States in 2005. The next year, Columbia/Legacy released a new Scandal compilation CD as part of the We Are the '80s series. The compilation contained three unreleased tracks from the 1982 recording sessions ("Grow So Wise", "If You Love Me", "I'm Here Tonight") as well as "All My Life," previously available on the flip side of "Goodbye to You". In July 2008, Billboard reported the upcoming release of new music by the band (featuring original members Keith Mack and Benjy King). They debuted their first single as a band ("Hard for You to Love Me," also referred to as "Make It Hard") in over 24 years on January 17, 2009 in Ridgefield, Connecticut.

== Personal life ==
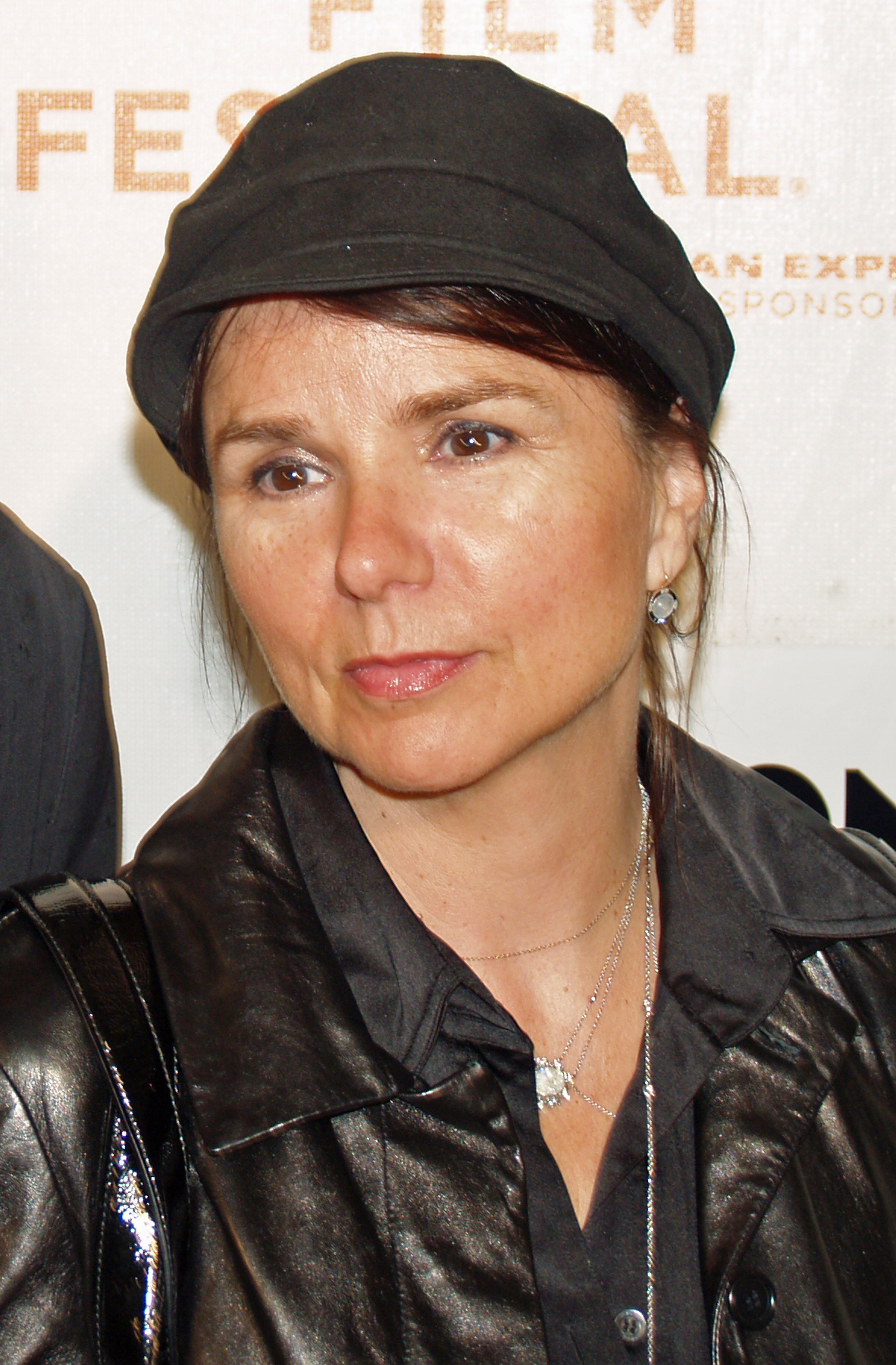
Smyth in 2008

Smyth was married to musician Richard Hell in 1985 to 1986; they had a daughter.

She met professional tennis player John McEnroe in 1993. Their daughter was born in 1995, and the couple married in 1997. They have since had another daughter. Smyth and McEnroe live in a duplex on the Upper West Side of Manhattan.

== Discography ==
=== Albums ===
Year	Album	Peak chart positions		Certifications
Year	Album	US	AUS	Certifications
1987	Never Enough	66	—	
1992	Patty Smyth	47	94	RIAA: Gold
1998	Greatest Hits – Featuring Scandal	—	—	
2015	Come On December	—	—	
2020	It's About Time	—	—	
"—" denotes a recording that did not chart.

=== Singles ===
Year	Single	Peak chart positions							Certifications	Album
Year	Single	US	US Main	US AC	AUS	CAN	CAN AC	UK	Certifications	Album
1987	"Never Enough"	61	4	—	—	—	—	—		Never Enough
1987	"Downtown Train"	95	40	—	—	—	—	—		Never Enough
1987	"Isn't It Enough"	—	26	—	—	—	—	—		Never Enough
1992	"Sometimes Love Just Ain't Enough" (with Don Henley)	2	—	1	5	1	2	22	RIAA: Gold	Patty Smyth
1992	"No Mistakes" (uncredited harmony vocal by Don Henley)	33	—	4	127	3	—	—		Patty Smyth
1993	"I Should Be Laughing"	86	—	—	153	—	—	—		Patty Smyth
1993	"Shine"	—	—	—	—	—	—	—		Patty Smyth
1994	"Look What Love Has Done"	106	—	23	—	21	10	—		Non-album single
2015	"Broken"	—	—	—	—	—	—	—		Come On December
2020	"Drive"	—	—	—	—	—	—	—		It's About Time
"—" denotes releases that did not chart
