= Don Henley discography =

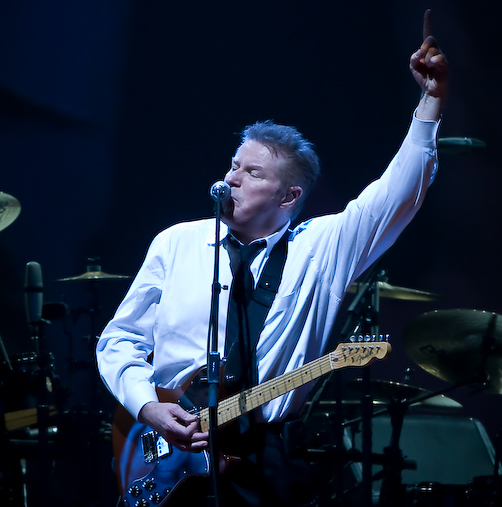
- Henley performing with the Eagles in 2008
- Studio albums: 5
- Compilation albums: 2
- Singles: 27
- Guest singles: 7

The discography of Don Henley, singer and drummer for the rock band Eagles, consists of five studio albums, two compilation albums, and 27 solo singles.

As a solo artist, Henley released his debut album, I Can't Stand Still, on August 13, 1982, via Asylum Records. This was his only album for the label. The album reached a peak of number 24 on the US Billboard 200 chart. It features the Top 5 single on the Billboard Hot 100, "Dirty Laundry". The single peaked at number three on the Hot 100 chart and was also certified Gold by the Recording Industry Association of America. His second album, Building the Perfect Beast, (Geffen Records, 1984) features the Top 10 singles "The Boys of Summer", "All She Wants to Do Is Dance", which reached number five and number nine on the Hot 100, respectively.

After five years of absence from new material, Henley's third studio album was released in 1989. The End of the Innocence became his first solo Top 10 album on the Billboard 200. By this time, Eagles had charted five Top 10 albums. The End of the Innocence became Henley's best-selling album to date, being certified six-times Platinum in the US. A fourth studio album, Inside Job, was released on May 23, 2000, via Warner Bros. Records. No single released made the Top 40 of the Hot 100; however, "Taking You Home" reached number one on the US Billboard Hot Adult Contemporary Tracks chart. His most recent album is Cass County, released in 2015.

== Albums ==
=== Studio albums ===
Title	Details	Peak chart positions								Certifications (sales threshold)
Title	Details	US	AUS	CAN	JPN	NOR	NZ	SWE	UK	Certifications (sales threshold)
I Can't Stand Still	Release date: August 13, 1982; Label: Asylum; Formats: CD, vinyl, cassette	24	42	5	20	22	14	34	—	US: Gold
Building the Perfect Beast	Release date: November 19, 1984; Label: Geffen; Formats: CD, vinyl, cassette	13	4	17	49	15	18	24	14	UK: Silver; US: 3× Platinum
The End of the Innocence	Release date: June 27, 1989; Label: Geffen; Formats: CD, vinyl, cassette	8	40	8	48	15	37	11	17	CAN: 2× Platinum; UK: Gold; US: 6× Platinum
Inside Job	Release date: May 23, 2000; Label: Warner Bros.; Formats: CD, cassette	7	—	8	23	37	—	22	25	CAN: Gold; US: Platinum
Cass County	Release date: September 25, 2015; Label: Capitol Records; Formats: CD, LP, music download	3	23	4	56	14	7	19	7	
"—" denotes releases that did not chart

=== Compilation albums ===
Title	Details	Peak chart positions						Certifications (sales threshold)
Title	Details	US	CAN	JPN	NOR	SWE	UK	Certifications (sales threshold)
Actual Miles: Henley's Greatest Hits	Release date: November 21, 1995; Label: Geffen; Formats: CD, cassette	48	13	85	—	—	—	US: Platinum
The Very Best of Don Henley	Release date: June 16, 2009; Label: Geffen; Formats: CD, music download	—	—	—	20	19	29	
"—" denotes releases that did not chart

== Video albums ==
Title	Details	Certification
Inside Job Live	Released: 2001	ARIA: Gold

== Singles ==
=== 1980s ===
Year	Single	Peak chart positions									Certifications (sales threshold)	Album
Year	Single	US	US Main	US AC	US Dance	US R&B	AUS	CAN	CAN AC	UK	Certifications (sales threshold)	Album
1982	"Johnny Can't Read"	42	29	—	—	—	49	—	—	—		I Can't Stand Still
1982	"Dirty Laundry"	3	1	—	47	—	51	1	—	59	US: Gold	I Can't Stand Still
1982	"You Better Hang Up"	—	44	—	—	—	—	—	—	—		I Can't Stand Still
1983	"I Can't Stand Still"	48	—	—	—	—	—	—	—	—		I Can't Stand Still
1983	"The Unclouded Day"	—	—	—	—	—	—	—	—	—		I Can't Stand Still
1984	"The Boys of Summer"	5	1	3	—	—	3	15	—	12		Building the Perfect Beast
1985	"All She Wants to Do Is Dance"	9	1	—	10	65	22	13	—	—		Building the Perfect Beast
1985	"Not Enough Love in the World"	34	17	6	—	—	—	63	1	—		Building the Perfect Beast
1985	"Sunset Grill"	22	7	18	—	—	98	52	3	102		Building the Perfect Beast
1985	"Drivin' With Your Eyes Closed" [US promo]	—	9	—	—	—	—	—	—	—		Building the Perfect Beast
1989	"The End of the Innocence"	8	1	2	—	—	54	3	3	48		The End of the Innocence
1989	"The Last Worthless Evening"	21	4	5	—	—	120	5	3	—		The End of the Innocence
1989	"I Will Not Go Quietly" [airplay]	—	2	—	—	—	—	—	—	—		The End of the Innocence
1989	"If Dirt Were Dollars" [airplay]	—	8	—	—	—	—	—	—	—		The End of the Innocence
"—" denotes releases that did not chart

=== 1990s ===
Year	Single	Peak chart positions							Album
Year	Single	US	US Main	US AC	AUS	CAN	CAN AC	UK	Album
1990	"The Heart of the Matter"	21	2	3	127	9	8	—	The End of the Innocence
1990	"How Bad Do You Want It?"	48	8	—	—	32	—	—	The End of the Innocence
1990	"New York Minute"	48	24	5	—	20	4	97	The End of the Innocence
1995	"The Garden of Allah"	—	16	—	—	25	—	—	Actual Miles: Henley's Greatest Hits
1995	"Everybody Knows"	—	—	—	—	18	—	—	Actual Miles: Henley's Greatest Hits
1996	"You Don't Know Me at All"	—	22	—	—	—	—	—	Actual Miles: Henley's Greatest Hits
1998	"The Boys of Summer" (UK re-release)	—	-	—	—	—	—	12	Actual Miles: Henley's Greatest Hits
"—" denotes releases that did not chart

=== 2000s–2010s ===
Year	Single	Peak chart positions						Album
Year	Single	US	US Main	US AC	US Adult	US Country	CAN AC	Album
2000	"Workin' It" [US promo]	—	21	—	—	—	—	Inside Job
2000	"Taking You Home"	58	—	1	12	—	1	Inside Job
2000	"Everything Is Different Now" [US promo]	—	—	21	—	—	—	Inside Job
2000	"For My Wedding" [airplay]	—	—	—	—	61	—	Inside Job
2015	"Take a Picture of This"	—	—	14	—	—	—	Cass County
"—" denotes releases that did not chart

== Other singles ==
=== Soundtrack singles ===
Year	Single	Peak chart positions					Album
Year	Single	US Main	US AC	US Adult	CAN	CAN AC	Album
1986	"Who Owns This Place?" [US promo]	3	—	—	—	—	The Color of Money
1993	"Sit Down, You're Rockin' the Boat" [airplay]	—	13	—	—	—	Leap of Faith
1996	"Through Your Hands"	33	14	26	9	14	Michael
"—" denotes releases that did not chart

=== Featured singles ===
Year	Single	Artist	Peak chart positions									Certifications (sales threshold)	Album
Year	Single	Artist	US	US Main	US AC	US Country	AUS	CAN	CAN AC	CAN Country	UK	Certifications (sales threshold)	Album
1981	"Leather and Lace"	Stevie Nicks	6	26	10	—	—	12	—	—	—		Bella Donna
1992	"Sometimes Love Just Ain't Enough"	Patty Smyth	2	1	1	—	5	1	2	—	22	ARIA: Gold	Patty Smyth
1993	"Walkaway Joe"	Trisha Yearwood	—	—	—	2	—	—	30	2	—		Hearts in Armor
1994	"Shakey Ground"	Elton John	—	—	—	—	—	64	—	—	—		Duets
2001	"Inside Out"	Trisha Yearwood	—	—	—	31	—	—	—	—	—		Inside Out
2002	"It's So Easy"	Sheryl Crow	—	—	—	—	—	—	—	—	—		C'mon, C'mon
2007	"Calling Me"	Kenny Rogers	—	—	—	53	—	—	—	—	—		Water & Bridges
2012	"More Life"	Randy Travis	—	—	—	—	—	—	—	—	—		Anniversary Celebration
"—" denotes releases that did not chart

== Other appearances ==
Year	Song	Album
1982	"Love Rules"	Fast Times at Ridgemont High soundtrack
1985	"She's on the Zoom"	Vision Quest soundtrack
1986	"Who Owns This Place?"	The Color of Money
1992	"Sit Down, You're Rockin' the Boat"	Leap of Faith
1994	"Come Rain or Come Shine" (live)	The Unplugged Collection, Volume One
1995	"Everybody Knows"	Tower of Song: The Songs of Leonard Cohen
1996	"Through Your Hands"	Michael
2002	"Can Love Stand the Test"	Country Bears
2004	"Searching for a Heart"	Enjoy Every Sandwich: The Songs of Warren Zevon
2014	"These Days" (with Blind Pilot)	Looking Into You: A Tribute to Jackson Browne
2018	"Sacrifice" (with Vince Gill)	Restoration: Reimagining the Songs of Elton John and Bernie Taupin

=== Guest ===
Year	Song	Album
1992	"Snakes and Ladders" (duet with Joni Mitchell)	Chalk Mark in a Rain Storm
1992	"Watching TV" (duet with Roger Waters)	Amused to Death
1993	"Amazing" (duet with Aerosmith)	Get a Grip
1994	"Bein' Green" (duet with Kermit the Frog)	Kermit Unpigged
1995	"Bless the Children of the World", "The Man" (duet with Randy Newman)	Randy Newman's Faust
2001	"Passin' Thru" (Earl Scruggs with Don Henley and Johnny Cash)	Earl Scruggs and Friends
2006	"What Makes the Irish Heart Beat" (duet with Jerry Lee Lewis)	Last Man Standing
2007	"Break Each Other's Hearts Again" (duet with Reba McEntire)	Reba: Duets
2009	"Garden Party" (John Fogerty featuring Don Henley and Timothy B. Schmit)	The Blue Ridge Rangers Rides Again
2011	"Love Her Like She's Leavin'" (Brad Paisley featuring Don Henley)	This Is Country Music
2014	"Hasten Down the Wind" (duet with Linda Ronstadt)	Duets

== Music videos ==
Year	Video
1982	"Johnny Can't Read"
1984	"The Boys of Summer"
1985	"All She Wants to Do Is Dance"
1985	"Not Enough Love in the World"
1989	"The End of the Innocence"
1989	"The Last Worthless Evening"
1990	"The Heart of the Matter"
1995	"The Garden of Allah"
2000	"For My Wedding"
2000	"Taking You Home"
2001	"Everything Is Different Now"
2015	"Take a Picture of This"
2015	"When I Stop Dreaming" (feat. Dolly Parton)
