= The Very Best of Don Henley =

Greatest hits album by Don Henley
- Released: June 16, 2009
- Recorded: 1981–2000
- Genres: Rock; hard rock; pop rock
- Length: 74:56
- Label: Geffen
- Producers: Don Henley; Mike Campbell; John Corey; Bruce Hornsby; Danny Kortchmar; Greg Ladanyi; Stan Lynch

Don Henley chronology
Inside Job (2000)	The Very Best of Don Henley (2009)	Cass County (2015)

Professional ratings
Review scores
Source	Rating
AllMusic	4.0/5 stars

The Very Best of Don Henley is the second greatest hits compilation album by American rock singer Don Henley, released in 2009 and his first release since Inside Job in 2000. A deluxe version containing extra bonus tracks plus DVD material is also available. The first 10 songs are in the same order in which they appear on Actual Miles: Henley's Greatest Hits (1995).

== Track listing ==
1. "Dirty Laundry" (Henley, Danny Kortchmar) – 5:37
2. "The Boys of Summer" (Mike Campbell, Henley) – 4:50
3. "All She Wants to Do Is Dance" (Kortchmar) – 4:30
4. "Not Enough Love in the World" (Henley, Kortchmar, Benmont Tench) – 3:55
5. "Sunset Grill" (Henley, Kortchmar, Tench) – 6:31
6. "The End of the Innocence" (Henley, Bruce Hornsby) – 5:17
7. "The Last Worthless Evening" (John Corey, Henley, Stan Lynch) – 6:04
8. "New York Minute" (Henley, Kortchmar, Jai Winding) – 6:36
9. "I Will Not Go Quietly" (Henley, Kortchmar) – 5:43
10. "The Heart of the Matter" (Campbell, Henley, JD Souther) – 5:23
11. "Everybody Knows" (Leonard Cohen, Sharon Robinson) – 6:09
12. "For My Wedding" (McNally) – 3:38
13. "Everything Is Different Now" (Crago, Drury, Henley) – 5:13
14. "Taking You Home" (Brawley, Henley, Lynch) – 5:32

== DVD track listing [Deluxe edition only] ==
1. "The Boys of Summer" (Video)
2. "All She Wants to Do Is Dance" (Video)
3. "The Last Worthless Evening" (Video)
4. "The Heart of the Matter" (Video)
5. "Everything Is Different Now" (Video)
6. "For My Wedding" (Video)

=== Bonus audio tracks ===
1. "Love Rules" - 4:04
2. "Who Owns This Place?" - 5:00
3. "Sit Down, You're Rockin' the Boat" - 4:32
4. "Through Your Hands" - 4:16

== Charts ==
Chart (2009)	Peak position
Danish Albums (Hitlisten)	30
Dutch Albums (Album Top 100)	26
Norwegian Albums (VG-lista)	20
Scottish Albums (Official Charts)	20
Swedish Albums (Sverigetopplistan)	19
UK Albums (Official Charts)	29

== Certifications ==
Region	Certification	Certified units/sales
United Kingdom (BPI)	Silver	60,000^{‡}
^{‡} Sales+streaming figures based on certification alone.
