= Actual Miles: Henley's Greatest Hits =

Greatest hits album by Don Henley
- Released: November 21, 1995
- Recorded: 1982–1995
- Genres: Rock; hard rock
- Length: 73:02
- Label: Geffen
- Producers: Don Henley; Mike Campbell; John Corey; Bruce Hornsby; Danny Kortchmar; Greg Ladanyi; Stan Lynch

Don Henley chronology
The End of the Innocence (1989)	Actual Miles: Henley's Greatest Hits (1995)	Inside Job (2000)

Singles from Actual Miles: Henley's Greatest Hits
- 1. "The Garden of Allah" Released: 1995

Professional ratings
Review scores
Source	Rating
AllMusic	4.5/5 stars

Actual Miles: Henley's Greatest Hits is the first solo greatest hits compilation album by American singer Don Henley, released on November 21, 1995 by Geffen Records. The album was the first compilation album released by Henley and it covered hits from all three of his solo albums throughout the 1980s. The album features three new songs, "The Garden of Allah", "You Don't Know Me at All", and Henley's cover of Leonard Cohen's "Everybody Knows". The collection peaked at No. 48 on the charts and reached platinum status. "The Garden of Allah" reached No. 16 on the Mainstream Rock Tracks chart.

== Album cover ==
The photograph on the cover half-jokingly depicts Henley as a cigar-smoking used car salesman, which Henley himself was asked about by David Letterman following a 1995 performance on The Late Show. Henley explained that the picture and album title was a subtle satire of the record industry.

== Track listing ==
Actual Miles: Henley's Greatest Hits track listing
No.	Title	Writer(s)	Original release	Length
1.	"Dirty Laundry"	Don Henley; Danny Kortchmar	I Can't Stand Still, 1982	5:36
2.	"The Boys of Summer"	Henley; Mike Campbell	Building the Perfect Beast, 1984	4:45
3.	"All She Wants to Do Is Dance"	Kortchmar	Building the Perfect Beast	4:28
4.	"Not Enough Love in the World"	Henley; Kortchmar; Benmont Tench	Building the Perfect Beast	3:54
5.	"Sunset Grill"	Henley; Kortchmar; Tench	Building the Perfect Beast	6:22
6.	"The End of the Innocence"	Henley; Bruce Hornsby	The End of the Innocence, 1989	5:14
7.	"The Last Worthless Evening"	Henley; John Corey; Stan Lynch	The End of the Innocence	6:05
8.	"New York Minute"	Henley; Kortchmar; Jai Winding	The End of the Innocence	6:34
9.	"I Will Not Go Quietly"	Henley; Kortchmar	The End of the Innocence	5:41
10.	"The Heart of the Matter"	Henley; Campbell; JD Souther	The End of the Innocence	5:21
11.	"The Garden of Allah"	Henley; Lynch; Corey; Paul Gurian	previously unreleased	7:02
12.	"You Don't Know Me at All"	Henley; Corey; Lynch	previously unreleased	5:36
13.	"Everybody Knows"	Leonard Cohen; Sharon Robinson	Tower of Song: The Songs of Leonard Cohen, 1995	6:10

== Personnel ==
Musicians and Vocals (Tracks 11–13)

- Don Henley
- John Corey (11, 12)
- Sheryl Crow (11)
- Danny Kortchmar (11)
- Stan Lynch (11, 12)
- Benmont Tench (13)
- Scott Plunkett (13)
- Frank Simes (12)
- Jimmy Rip (13)
- Neil Stubenhaus
- Timothy B. Schmit (12)
- Vinnie Colaiuta (11, 12)
- Scott Crago (13)
- Carmen Twillie (13)
- Julia Waters (11, 13)
- Maxine Waters (11, 13)
- Mindy Stein (12)

Production (Tracks 11–13)

- Don Henley – producer
- Stan Lynch – producer
- John Corey – producer (11, 12)
- Rob Jacobs – mixing, engineer (11, 12), recording (13)
- Roger Sommers – additional engineer (11, 12)
- Bill Dooley – additional engineer (13)
- Jim Labinski – assistant engineer (11)
- Chad Munsey – assistant engineer (11, 13)
- Krish Sharma – assistant engineer (12)
- John Aguto – assistant engineer (13)
- Michael W. Douglass – assistant engineer (13)
- Barry Goldberg – assistant engineer (13)
- Dave Collins – mastering at A&M Mastering Studios (Hollywood, California)
- Julie Larson – production coordinator (13)
- Frank W. Ockenfels 3 – photography
- Janet Wolsborn – art direction
- Robin Sloane – creative direction

== Charts ==
=== Weekly charts ===
Chart (1995–1996)	Peak position
Canada Top Albums/CDs (RPM)	13
Japanese Albums (Oricon)	85
New Zealand Albums (RMNZ)	24
US Billboard 200	48

=== Year-end charts ===
Chart (1996)	Position
US Billboard 200	139

== Certifications ==
Region	Certification	Certified units/sales
United Kingdom (BPI)	Silver	60,000^{^}
United States (RIAA)	Platinum	1,000,000^{^}
^{^} Shipments figures based on certification alone.
