= List of Billboard Adult Contemporary number ones of 2000 =

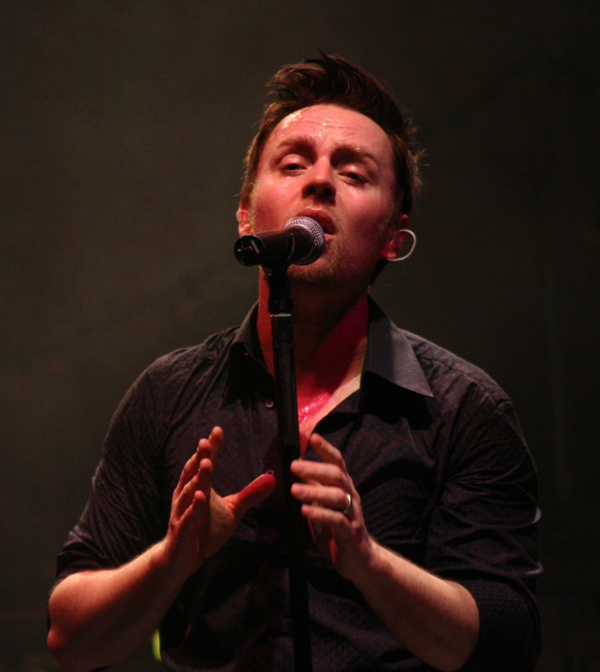
Savage Garden (vocalist Darren Hayes pictured) spent the first 16 weeks of the year at number one with their song “I Knew I Loved You”.

Adult Contemporary is a chart published by Billboard ranking the top-performing songs in the United States in the adult contemporary music (AC) market. In 2000, seven different songs topped the chart, based on weekly airplay data from radio stations compiled by Nielsen Broadcast Data Systems.

In the issue of Billboard dated January 1, 2000, the number one song was "I Knew I Loved You" by Savage Garden, which was in its second week in the top spot. The Australian duo's song remained atop the chart for the first 16 weeks of 2000, the longest unbroken run of the year at number one, before being displaced in the issue of Billboard dated April 22 by Faith Hill's song "Breathe". "I Knew I Loved You" would prove to be one of the most enduring songs in the history of AC radio, and in 2002, it set a new record for the highest total number of weeks spent on Billboard's Adult Contemporary chart when it spent its 124th week on the listing, breaking the record set by one of Savage Garden's earlier songs, "Truly Madly Deeply". It also topped the magazine's all-genre chart, the Hot 100, but would prove to be one of Savage Garden's final charting songs, as the duo split up the following year. Hill's "Breathe" spent one more week at number one in 2000 than "I Knew I Loved You", albeit non-consecutively. From April through September the country singer spent 17 weeks at number one in four spells; it was knocked from the top spot on three occasions by "You Sang to Me" by the Latin pop star Marc Anthony. "You Sang to Me" was one of the first English-language hits for Anthony, the biggest-selling artist in the history of salsa music.

In the last quarter of the year, Don Henley spent four weeks at number one with "Taking You Home", from Inside Job, his first album since 1989, and the British group BBMak spent seven non-consecutive weeks in the top spot with "Back Here". BBMak's run at number one was interrupted for one week by Huey Lewis and Gwyneth Paltrow's version of Smokey Robinson's song "Cruisin'", taken from the soundtrack of the karaoke-themed film Duets, in which the pair played a father and daughter who perform the song together. Lewis had attained chart success with his band Huey Lewis and the News since the early 1980s, including number ones on both the Hot 100 and the AC chart, but "Cruisin'" was the actress Paltrow's first appearance on either listing. The final AC number one of the year was "This I Promise You" by NSYNC, which claimed the top spot in the issue of Billboard dated December 30.

== Chart history ==
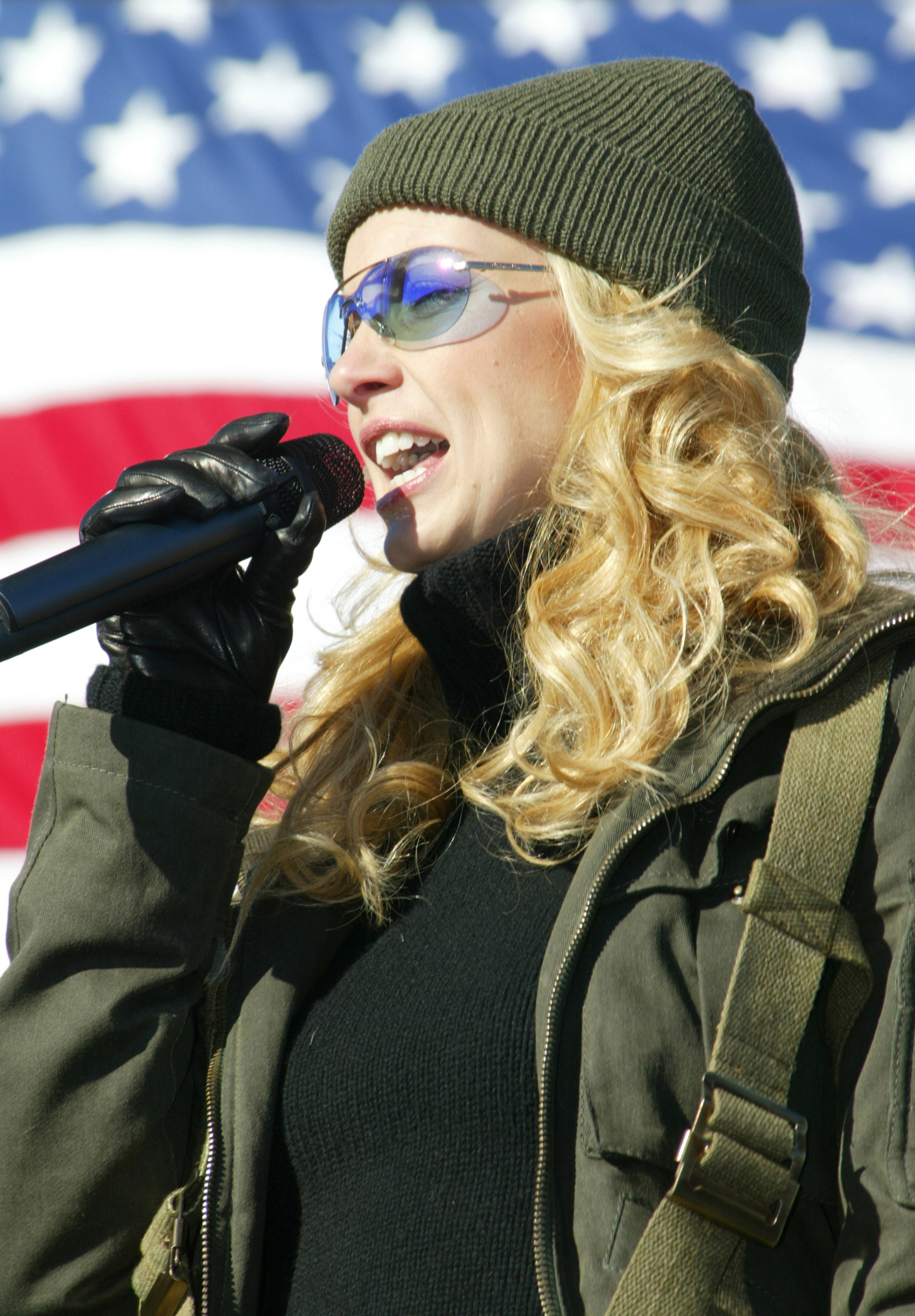
"Breathe" by Faith Hill had four runs at number one and spent a total of 17 weeks in the top spot.

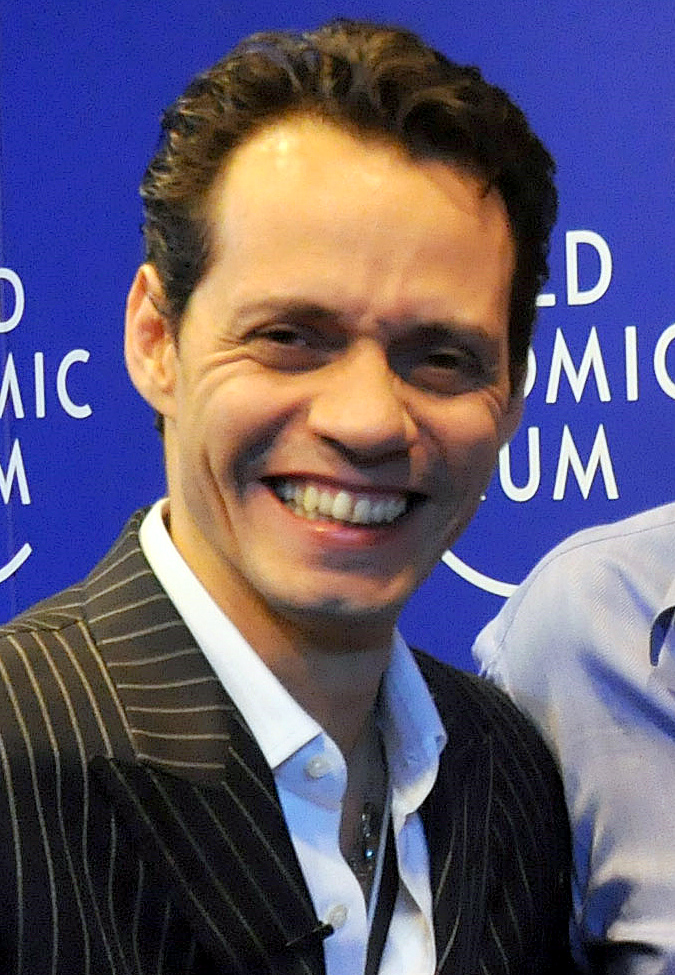
"You Sang to Me" was a number one for Latin pop star Marc Anthony.

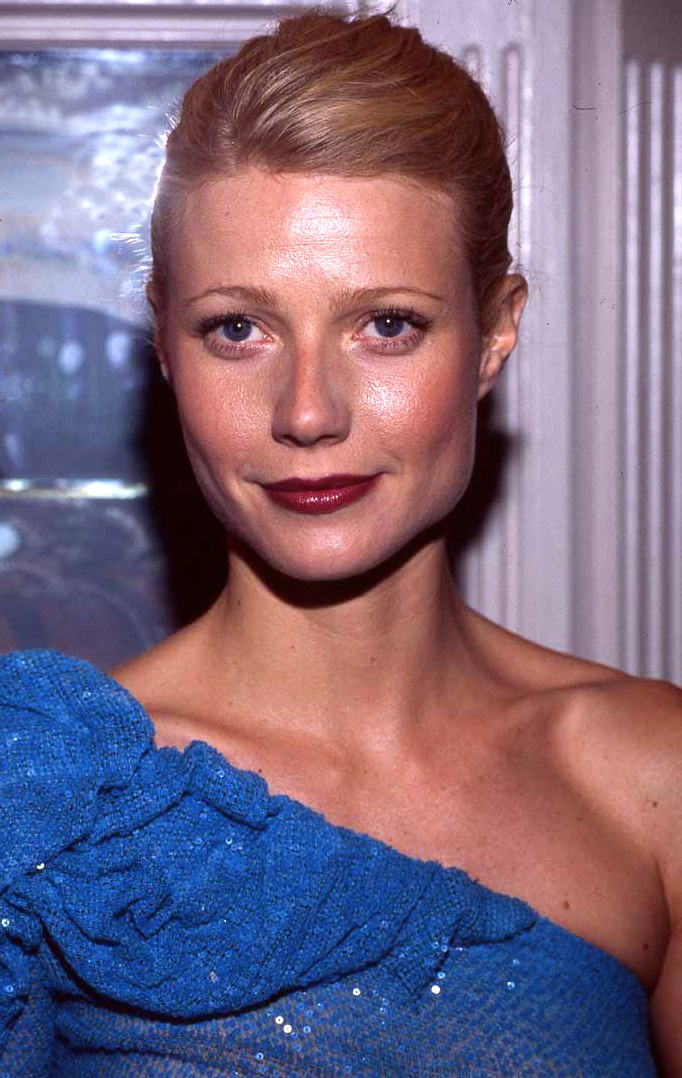
The actress Gwyneth Paltrow topped the chart with the song "Cruisin'", which she performed with Huey Lewis in the film Duets.

Chart history
Issue date	Title	Artist(s)	Ref.
January 1	"I Knew I Loved You"	Savage Garden	
January 8	"I Knew I Loved You"	Savage Garden	
January 15	"I Knew I Loved You"	Savage Garden	
January 22	"I Knew I Loved You"	Savage Garden	
January 29	"I Knew I Loved You"	Savage Garden	
February 5	"I Knew I Loved You"	Savage Garden	
February 12	"I Knew I Loved You"	Savage Garden	
February 19	"I Knew I Loved You"	Savage Garden	
February 26	"I Knew I Loved You"	Savage Garden	
March 4	"I Knew I Loved You"	Savage Garden	
March 11	"I Knew I Loved You"	Savage Garden	
March 18	"I Knew I Loved You"	Savage Garden	
March 25	"I Knew I Loved You"	Savage Garden	
April 1	"I Knew I Loved You"	Savage Garden	
April 8	"I Knew I Loved You"	Savage Garden	
April 15	"I Knew I Loved You"	Savage Garden	
April 22	"Breathe"	Faith Hill	
April 29	"Breathe"	Faith Hill	
May 6	"Breathe"	Faith Hill	
May 13	"Breathe"	Faith Hill	
May 20	"Breathe"	Faith Hill	
May 27	"Breathe"	Faith Hill	
June 3	"Breathe"	Faith Hill	
June 10	"Breathe"	Faith Hill	
June 17	"Breathe"	Faith Hill	
June 24	"Breathe"	Faith Hill	
July 1	"Breathe"	Faith Hill	
July 8	"Breathe"	Faith Hill	
July 15	"Breathe"	Faith Hill	
July 22	"You Sang to Me"	Marc Anthony	
July 29	"Breathe"	Faith Hill	
August 5	"Breathe"	Faith Hill	
August 12	"You Sang to Me"	Marc Anthony	
August 19	"You Sang to Me"	Marc Anthony	
August 26	"Breathe"	Faith Hill	
September 2	"You Sang to Me"	Marc Anthony	
September 9	"You Sang to Me"	Marc Anthony	
September 16	"You Sang to Me"	Marc Anthony	
September 23	"You Sang to Me"	Marc Anthony	
September 30	"Breathe"	Faith Hill	
October 7	"Taking You Home"	Don Henley	
October 14	"Taking You Home"	Don Henley	
October 21	"Taking You Home"	Don Henley	
October 28	"Taking You Home"	Don Henley	
November 4	"Back Here"	BBMak	
November 11	"Back Here"	BBMak	
November 18	"Back Here"	BBMak	
November 25	"Back Here"	BBMak	
December 2	"Back Here"	BBMak	
December 9	"Back Here"	BBMak	
December 16	"Cruisin'"	Huey Lewis & Gwyneth Paltrow	
December 23	"Back Here"	BBMak	
December 30	"This I Promise You"	NSYNC	

== See also ==
- 2000 in music
- List of artists who reached number one on the U.S. Adult Contemporary chart
