= New York Minute (song) =

Single by Don Henley

from the album The End of the Innocence
- B-side: "Gimme What You Got"
- Released: October 23, 1989 (UK); November 1990 (US)
- Recorded: 1988
- Genre: Rock
- Length: 6:37
- Label: Geffen
- Songwriters: Don Henley, Danny Kortchmar, and Jai Winding
- Producers: Don Henley and Danny Kortchmar

Don Henley singles chronology
"How Bad Do You Want It?" (1990)	"New York Minute" (1989)	"The Garden of Allah" (1995)

"New York Minute" is a song written by Don Henley, Danny Kortchmar, and Jai Winding. Henley originally recorded it for his third solo studio album The End of the Innocence (1989). The track features Pino Palladino on fretless bass, Toto members David Paich, who played piano and wrote the string arrangement, and Jeff Porcaro on drums. It also features Take 6 on background vocals.

== Reception ==
The single was a #5 hit on the U.S. Adult Contemporary chart the following year, although it reached only #48 on the Billboard Hot 100.

== Eagles performances ==
"New York Minute" is one of several of Henley's solo songs to be performed by the Eagles (the others being "Dirty Laundry", "All She Wants to Do Is Dance", "The Boys of Summer", "The Heart of the Matter", and "Sunset Grill") during the Hell Freezes Over tour.

== Personnel ==
- Don Henley – lead vocals
- Danny Kortchmar – keyboards, guitars
- Jai Winding – keyboards
- David Paich – acoustic piano, string arrangements
- Pino Palladino – bass guitar
- Jeff Porcaro – drums
- Steve Madaio – trumpet solo
- Take 6 – backing vocals

== Other appearances ==
It is featured in The West Wing episode "Somebody's Going to Emergency, Somebody's Going to Jail," which was named for a line from the song. It is also featured in the Friends episode "The One with Two Parts, Part Two" and at the final of the first episode (365) of Black Monday.

Jazz pianist Herbie Hancock recorded the song on his 1996 album, The New Standard. The personnel was Hancock on acoustic piano, Michael Brecker on tenor saxophone, John Scofield on guitar, Dave Holland on double bass, Jack DeJohnette on drumset and Don Alias on percussion.

== Charts ==
=== Weekly charts ===
Chart (1989–1991)	Peak position
Netherlands (Single Top 100)	45
UK Singles (Official Charts)	97
US Billboard Hot 100	48
US Adult Contemporary (Billboard)	5
US Mainstream Rock (Billboard)	24

=== Year-end charts ===
Chart (1991)	Position
US Adult Contemporary (Billboard)	38
