= Sunset Grill =

Sunset Grill may refer to:

- "Sunset Grill" (song), a song by Don Henley, first released on his 1984 album Building the Perfect Beast
- Sunset Grill (film), a 1993 film starring Peter Weller, Lori Singer, and Stacy Keach
- Sunset Grill (American restaurant), a restaurant in West Hollywood, California
- Sunset Grill (Canadian restaurant chain), a restaurant chain throughout the province of Ontario

== See also ==
- Sunset Bar and Grill
- Sunset (disambiguation)
