= It Happens All the Time (disambiguation) =

It Happens All the Time is an album by Megan Hilty, or the title song.

It Happens All the Time may also refer to:

- "It Happens All the Time", a 1968 song by The Merseybeats, under the pseudonym Crackers
- "It Happens All the Time", a 2014 song by Tyler Shaw
- "It Happens All the Time", a song by Squirrel Nut Zippers, featuring Worried Man Blues
- "It Happens All the Time", a song by Dressy Bessy from the album Electrified
- "It Happens All the Time", a song by Anne Murray from the album Harmony
