= Inside Job (Don Henley album) =

Studio album by Don Henley
- Released: May 23, 2000
- Recorded: 1997–2000
- Studios: The Record Plant (Hollywood, California); Samain Sound (Malibu, California); Royaltone (North Hollywood, California); Jai Winding Studios (Santa Monica, California); Le Mobile (Dallas, Texas); ASC Sumet Studios (Dallas, Texas)
- Genres: Rock; hard rock; pop rock
- Length: 69:58
- Label: Warner Bros.
- Producers: Don Henley; Stan Lynch

Don Henley chronology
Actual Miles: Henley's Greatest Hits (1995)	Inside Job (2000)	The Very Best of Don Henley (2009)

Professional ratings
Review scores
Source	Rating
AllMusic	3/5 stars
Robert Christgau	C−

Inside Job is the fourth solo studio album by Don Henley, the lead vocalist and drummer for the Eagles. The album was released through the Warner Bros. record label on May 23, 2000; it was Henley's last album of all-new material until the release of Cass County in 2015, as well as his first album to be recorded fully digitally. The album was the first solo album for Henley in 11 years, the album reached #7 on the charts and released two Adult Contemporary Tracks singles with "Taking You Home", and "Everything Is Different Now". "Taking You Home" was also released as a single, and on the Billboard Hot 100, it peaked at #58.

== Reception ==
=== Critical ===
Reviewing for AllMusic, critic Stephen Thomas Erlewine wrote of the album, "Inside Job lacks the melodic craftsmanship that made Building the Perfect Beast a blockbuster, and it isn't as focused as The End of the Innocence, but it is a solid comeback record from an artist who spent a little too long out of the spotlight."

=== Commercial ===
The album debuted on the Billboard 200 at No. 7 on its release in May 2000, then Henley's highest-charting album. It was certified Platinum by the RIAA on July 12, 2000. The album has sold 1,124,000 copies in the US as of September 2015.

== Track listing ==
No.	Title	Writer(s)	Length
1.	"Nobody Else in the World But You"	Don Henley; Stan Lynch; Jai Winding	4:50
2.	"Taking You Home"	Stuart Brawley; Henley; Lynch	5:31
3.	"For My Wedding"	Larry John McNally	3:37
4.	"Everything Is Different Now"	Henley; Scott F. Crago; Timothy Drury	5:13
5.	"Workin' It"	Henley; Frank Simes; Lynch	5:37
6.	"Goodbye to a River"	Henley; Lynch; Winding; Simes	5:49
7.	"Inside Job"	Henley; Mike Campbell	4:50
8.	"They're Not Here, They're Not Coming"	Henley; Lynch	5:59
9.	"Damn It, Rose"	Henley; Lynch	7:13
10.	"Miss Ghost"	Henley; Lynch; Winding	6:41
11.	"The Genie"	Henley; Lynch; Brawley	5:45
12.	"Annabel"	Henley; John Corey	3:41
13.	"My Thanksgiving"	Henley; Lynch; Winding	5:12

== Personnel ==
Musicians

- Don Henley – lead vocals
- Michael Fisher (1, 4, 5, 8, 10, 13)
- Glenn Frey (1)
- Randy Jackson (1, 5, 10)
- Danny Kortchmar (1, 10)
- Stan Lynch (1–3, 5–11, 13)
- Jai Winding (1, 6, 10, 13)
- Stevie Wonder (1)
- Stuart Brawley (2, 3, 7–9, 11)
- Don Felder (2)
- David Paich (2)
- Dean Parks (3)
- Benmont Tench (3–6, 8–10)
- Mike Campbell (4, 7, 8)
- Scott F. Crago (4)
- Timothy Drury (4)
- Gregg Bissonette (5)
- Frank Simes (5, 10)
- Jebin Bruni (7)
- Lance Morrison (7)
- Stevie Gurr (8)
- Larry Klein (8)
- Tim Pierce (8)
- Bob Glaub (9)
- Steuart Smith (9)
- Jimmie Vaughan (10)
- John Corey (12)
- Randy Newman – string arrangements and conductor (12)

Backing vocals

- Stevie Wonder (1)
- Dorian Holley (2, 5, 11)
- Darryl Phinnessee (2)
- Mervyn Warren (2, 5, 11)
- Josef Powell (4)
- Carmen Twillie (4)
- Julia Waters (4)
- Luther Waters (4)
- Maxine Willard Waters (4)
- Oren Waters (4)
- Mona Lisa Young (4)
- Terry Young (4)
- Kevin Dorsey (5, 11)
- Michael Mishaw (5, 11)
- Kipp Lennon (7)
- Mark Lennon (7)
- Michael Lennon (7)
- Pat Lennon (7)
- Jana Anderson (10)
- Valerie Carter (10)

Technical personnel

- Don Henley – producer
- Stan Lynch – producer
- Rob Jacobs – recording, mixing at One on One Studios (North Hollywood, California) and Record Plant
- Stuart Brawley – additional recording
- Andy Ackland – assistant engineer
- Dave Ashton – assistant engineer
- Charlie Bouis – assistant engineer
- Andy Haller – assistant engineer
- Daniel Mendez – assistant engineer
- Adam Olmstead – assistant engineer
- Roger Sommers – assistant engineer
- Jeff Thomas – assistant engineer
- Ken Villeneuve – assistant engineer
- Ted Barela – technical support
- Joe Birkman – technical support
- Steve Griffin – technical support
- Dave Hecht – technical support
- Bill Kaylor – technical support
- Art Kelm – technical support
- Stewart Whitmore – digital editing
- Stephen Marcussen – mastering at Marcussen Mastering (Hollywood, California)
- Stephen Walker – art direction, design
- Dennis Keeley – front cover photography, additional photography
- Matthew Welch – additional photography

== Charts ==
=== Weekly charts ===
2000 weekly chart performance for Inside Job
Chart (2000)	Peak position
Canada Top Albums/CDs (RPM)	8
Dutch Albums (Album Top 100)	68
Finnish Albums (Suomen virallinen lista)	36
German Albums (Offizielle Top 100)	14
Irish Albums (IRMA)	11
Japanese Albums (Oricon)	23
Norwegian Albums (VG-lista)	37
Scottish Albums (Official Charts)	20
Swedish Albums (Sverigetopplistan)	22
Swiss Albums (Schweizer Hitparade)	77
UK Albums (Official Charts)	25
US Billboard 200	7

2025 weekly chart performance for Inside Job
Chart (2025)	Peak position
Hungarian Physical Albums (MAHASZ)	14

=== Year-end charts ===
Year-end chart performance for Inside Job
Chart (2000)	Peak position
Canadian Albums (Nielsen SoundScan)	136
US Billboard 200	103

== Certifications ==
Certifications for Inside Job
Region	Certification	Certified units/sales
Canada (Music Canada)	Gold	50,000^{^}
United States (RIAA)	Platinum	1,000,000^{^}
^{^} Shipments figures based on certification alone.
