= Cass County (album) =

Studio album by Don Henley
- Released: September 25, 2015
- Recorded: 2014–2015
- Studios: Red Oak (Dallas, Texas); Luminous Sound (Dallas, Texas); Allentown (Nashville, Tennessee); Sound Emporium (Nashville, Tennessee); Blackbird (Nashville, Tennessee); House of Blues Studios (Nashville, Tennessee)
- Genre: Country
- Length: 62:43
- Labels: Past Masters Holdings, Capitol Records
- Producers: Don Henley, Stan Lynch

Don Henley chronology
The Very Best of Don Henley (2009)	Cass County (2015)

Cass County is the fifth solo studio album by American singer-songwriter Don Henley. The album was released on September 25, 2015, by Past Masters Holdings and Capitol Records. It was Don Henley's first new solo album in 15 years since 2000's Inside Job.

== Background ==
In June 2015, Don Henley spoke about recording the album in Nashville, Tennessee, saying: "The great majority [of recording] was done right here in Nashville and I can truthfully say that I enjoyed making this record more than any record I've made in my career. And a lot of the reason is because of the people who participated. There's some amazing musicians here and the best thing about it is, most of them are funny. So it was a real pleasure."

The album is named after the East Texas county where Henley grew up.

== Critical reception ==
Professional ratings
Aggregate scores
Source	Rating
Metacritic	72/100
Review scores
Source	Rating
AllMusic	4/5 stars
American Songwriter	4/5 stars
The Guardian	3/5 stars
PopMatters	5/10 stars
Rolling Stone	4/5 stars

Cass County received generally positive reviews from music critics. At Metacritic, which assigns a normalized rating out of 100 to reviews from mainstream critics, the album received an average score of 72 based on 9 reviews, which indicates "generally favorable reviews". David Icke of Rolling Stone said, "Written and produced with Stan Lynch, the original drummer in Tom Petty's Heartbreakers, Cass County is meticulously crafted, sharply written and absolutely free of neo-country additives like reheated Seventies-rock bombast and Twitter-verse vernacular." Dave Heaton of PopMatters stated, "At the album’s best, Henley conjures up the push-pull between restlessness and contentment in a way that jibes well with the musical interest in the traditions of the genre. At its worst, the album makes me want to throw it out the window, either for the cliches or more often the way the persona of the album comes from a lecturing place of “wisdom”; an I’ve-lived, so I know attitude." Jon Caramanica of The New York Times said, "The number and potency of these guests sometimes make Cass County sound like a tribute album to someone not yet gone. They also take away from Mr. Henley, now 68, whose voice has decayed nicely, though it now lacks the wise punch it had on The End of the Innocence, his excellent 1989 album."

Rolling Stone ranked the release at Number 20 on their Top 50 Best Albums of 2015, and Number 2 on their Top 40 Best Country Albums of 2015.

== Commercial performance ==
The album debuted at number three on the Billboard 200 and number one on the Top Country Albums on its release. It was also the top selling album of the week, with 87,000 copies of pure albums sold in the United States. The album has sold 259,400 copies in the US as of August 2016.

== Track listing ==
All tracks composed by Don Henley and Stan Lynch, except where indicated.

No.	Title	Writer(s)	Length
1.	"Bramble Rose" (featuring Mick Jagger and Miranda Lambert)	Tift Merritt	4:30
2.	"The Cost of Living" (featuring Merle Haggard)		3:40
3.	"No, Thank You" (featuring Vince Gill)		3:45
4.	"Waiting Tables" (featuring Jamey Johnson and Lee Ann Womack)	Henley, Lynch, Steuart Smith, Timothy B. Schmit	4:47
5.	"Take a Picture of This"		4:06
6.	"Too Far Gone" (deluxe edition bonus track featuring Alison Krauss and Jamey Johnson)	Billy Sherrill	3:43
7.	"That Old Flame" (featuring Martina McBride)		4:25
8.	"The Brand New Tennessee Waltz" (deluxe edition bonus track featuring Alison Krauss)	Jesse Winchester	3:20
9.	"Words Can Break Your Heart" (featuring Trisha Yearwood)	Henley, Lynch, Smith	3:40
10.	"When I Stop Dreaming" (featuring Dolly Parton)	Charlie Louvin, Ira Louvin	3:06
11.	"Praying for Rain" (featuring Molly Felder, Vince Gill, Alison Krauss, Ashley Monroe and Trisha Yearwood)		5:00
12.	"Too Much Pride" (deluxe edition bonus track)	Henley, Lynch, Smith	3:45
13.	"She Sang Hymns Out of Tune" (deluxe edition bonus track featuring Court Yard Hounds and Ashley Monroe)	Jesse Lee Kincaid	3:15
14.	"Train In the Distance" (featuring Lucinda Williams)		4:47
15.	"A Younger Man"	Henley, Lynch, Smith	4:20
16.	"Where I Am Now" (featuring Trisha Yearwood)		2:34

Target deluxe edition bonus tracks
No.	Title	Length
17.	"It Don't Matter to the Sun" (featuring Stevie Nicks)	3:40
18.	"Here Come Those Tears Again" (featuring Alison Krauss)	3:50

== Personnel ==
=== Musicians ===
- Don Henley – vocals, lead guitar (12, 15)
- Mike Rojas – acoustic piano (2, 5, 11, 12), organ (5, 11), Wurlitzer electric piano (16)
- Tony Harrell – acoustic piano (4, 9, 10), organ (4, 9), harmonium (8, 13)
- Richard Davis – keyboards (5), organ (15), cello (15)
- John Deaderick – keyboards (7, 14)
- Richard Bowden – electric guitar (1, 4)
- Aaron Kelley – electric guitar (1), mandolin (1)
- Steuart Smith – acoustic guitar (1, 4, 6, 8–13, 16), electric guitar (2, 5, 9, 16), acoustic bass (2), acoustic piano (6), arrangements (13), bass (15)
- Milo Deering – pedal steel guitar (1–4, 6, 10, 11, 15), fiddle (3, 6)
- Jim Hoke – mandolin (2), pedal steel guitar (12, 16)
- Vince Gill – electric guitar (3), harmony vocals (3, 11), acoustic guitar (11)
- Pat Buchanan – electric guitar (3, 11, 16), harmonica (3), acoustic guitar (12)
- Jerry Douglas – lap steel guitar (3)
- J.T. Corenflos – electric guitar (4, 9, 10, 13), acoustic guitar (8)
- Russ Pahl – pedal steel guitar (5, 8, 9)
- Bryan Sutton – acoustic guitar (7, 14), mandolin (14)
- Jerry McPherson – electric guitar (7)
- Chris Holt – lead guitar (7)
- Stuart Duncan – mandolin (8), fiddle (8)
- Dan Dugmore – pedal steel guitar (10, 13), dobro (13)
- Rob Ickes – dobro (14)
- Gordon Kennedy – electric guitar (16)
- David Piltch – bass (1, 6)
- Glenn Worf – bass (2, 4, 5, 9, 10, 12), upright bass (8, 13)
- Jimmie Lee Sloas – bass (7, 16)
- Michael Rhodes – bass (11)
- Jimmy Johnson – bass (14)
- Alex Hahn – drums (1, 6)
- Greg Morrow – drums (2–5, 7–13), percussion (4, 8, 12, 13)
- Will Henley – drums (3)
- Gregg Bissonette – drums (14)
- Shannon Forrest – drums (16), percussion (16)
- Matt Allen – percussion (3)
- Stan Lynch – percussion (3, 5, 7–9, 11, 14–16), acoustic guitar (5, 15), electric guitar (5, 14)
- Bill Chaplin – percussion (14)
- Marco Giovino – percussion (14)
- Mick Jagger – harmonica (1), vocals (1)
- David Moran – hammered dulcimer (11)
- Joe Bolero – tenor saxophone (12)
- Pat Gullota – trombone (12)
- Steve Falkner – trumpet (12)
- Herb Pedersen – arrangements (13)
- Miranda Lambert – vocals (1)
- Merle Haggard – vocals (2)
- Molly Felder – harmony vocals (4, 11, 13)
- Jamey Johnson – harmony vocals (4, 6)
- Lee Ann Womack – harmony vocals (4)
- Michelle Branch – harmony vocals (5)
- Sally Dworsky – harmony vocals (5)
- Gale Mayes – harmony vocals (5, 12)
- Angela Primm – harmony vocals (5, 12)
- Alison Krauss – harmony vocals (6, 8, 11)
- Martina McBride – harmony vocals (7)
- Trisha Yearwood – harmony vocals (9, 11, 16)
- Dolly Parton – lead vocals (10)
- Ashley Monroe – harmony vocals (11, 13), banjo (13)
- Martie Maguire – harmony vocals (13), fiddle (13)
- Emily Robison – harmony vocals (13)
- Lucinda Williams – harmony vocals (14)
- The Nashville Choir – choir (14)

=== Production ===
- Producers – Don Henley and Stan Lynch
- Engineers – Jeff Balding, Chris Bell, Gordon Hammond and Hank Linderman
- Additional engineers – Billy Chapin, Richard Davis and Tim Kimsey
- Assistant engineers – Matthew Allen, Sean Badum, Matt Coles, Tom Freitag, Nick Kallstrom, David Mikeal, Seth Morton, Seth Myers, Mike Stankiewicz, Adam Taylor, Christopher Wilkinson and Nathan Yarbourough
- Mixed by Jeff Balding at Blackbird Studio (Nashville, TN) and Opolona Studio (Los Angeles, California)
- Technician – Bill Lanham
- Mastered by Bob Ludwig at Gateway Mastering (Portland, Maine)
- Production assistant – Scott Johnson
- Art direction and design – Jeri Heiden at SMOG Design
- Photography – Danny Clinch
- Additional photography – David McClister

== Charts ==
=== Weekly charts ===
Chart (2015)	Peak position
Australian Albums (ARIA)	23
Austrian Albums (Ö3 Austria)	34
Belgian Albums (Ultratop Flanders)	39
Belgian Albums (Ultratop Wallonia)	52
Canadian Albums (Billboard)	4
Danish Albums (Hitlisten)	26
Dutch Albums (Album Top 100)	5
German Albums (Offizielle Top 100)	21
Irish Albums (IRMA)	14
Italian Albums (FIMI)	81
Japanese Albums (Oricon)	56
New Zealand Albums (RMNZ)	7
Norwegian Albums (VG-lista)	14
Scottish Albums (OCC)	5
Swedish Albums (Sverigetopplistan)	14
Swiss Albums (Schweizer Hitparade)	20
UK Albums (Official Charts)	7
US Billboard 200	3
US Top Country Albums (Billboard)	1
US Americana/Folk Albums (Billboard)	25

=== Year-end charts ===
Chart (2015)	Position
US Billboard 200	179
US Top Country Albums (Billboard)	23

Chart (2016)	Position
US Top Country Albums (Billboard)	29
