= Alexander Cores =

Russian-American violinist

Alexander Cores (1901-February 5, 1994) was a violinist and founder and first violin of the Dorian String Quartet.

Born in Russia, Cores studied in Berlin and at the Juilliard School under Leopold Auer and Paul Kochanski. Cores was a member of the New York Philharmonic from 1925 to 1931. His Dorian String Quartet performed a series of contemporary music concerts on CBS Radio. He performed on recordings for Columbia Masterworks Records and Vox Records. He also taught comedian Jack Benny to play the violin poorly for comedic effect. In 1989, he joined the violin faculty at the Mannes College of Music.

Cores was the brother of violist Michael Cores and the uncle of novelist Lucy Cores.
