= Sunset Grill (American restaurant) =

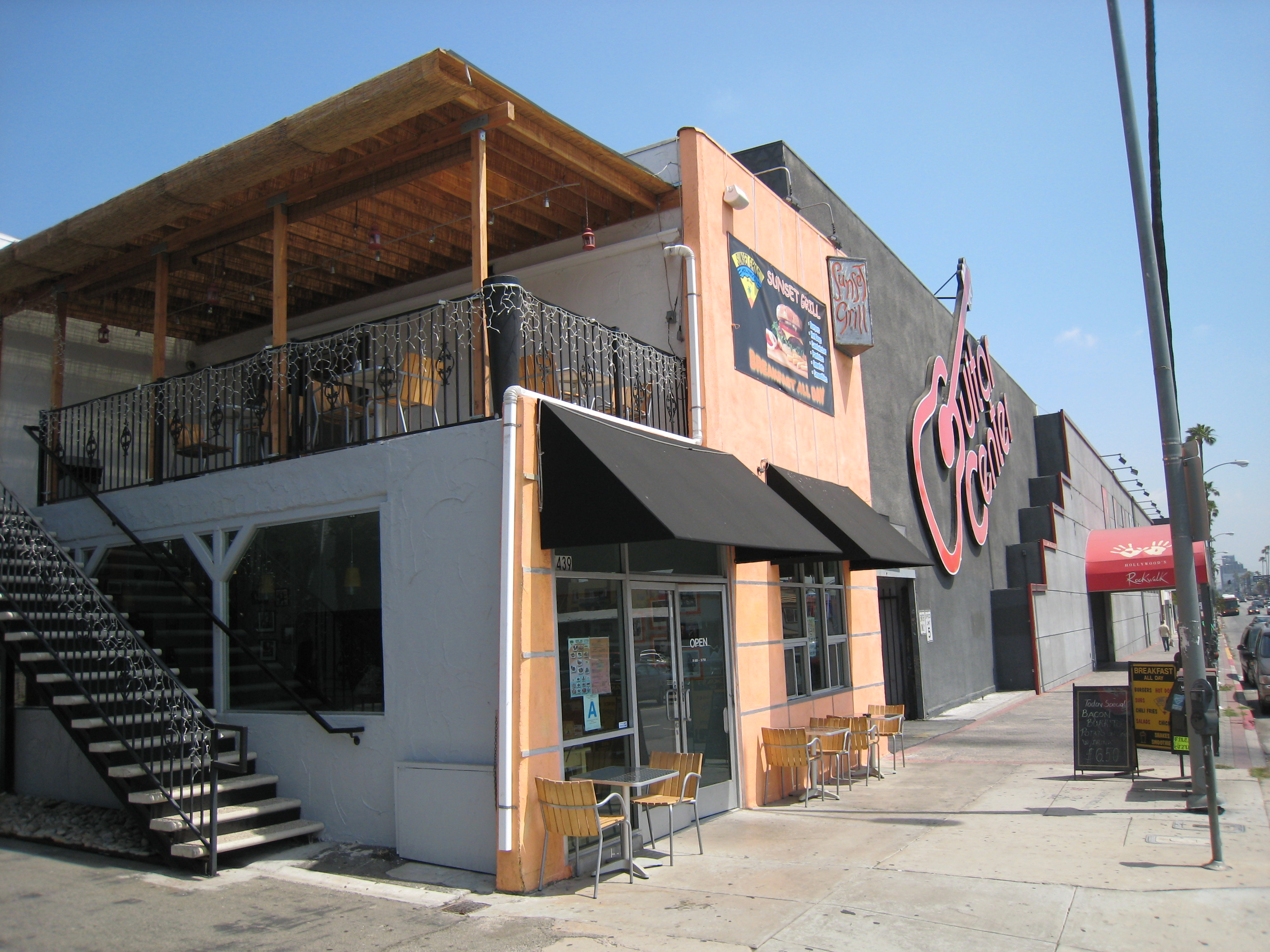
- The Sunset Grill in April 2007
- Interactive map of Sunset Grill

Restaurant information
- Location: 7439 Sunset Boulevard, Los Angeles, California, United States
- Coordinates: 34.0982°N 118.35224°W
- Website: sunsetgrillhollywood.com

The Sunset Grill is a restaurant at 7439 Sunset Boulevard in Los Angeles, California. The burger joint neighbors the Rock Walk at the Guitar Center and gained fame from the Don Henley song "Sunset Grill".

Henley and his co-composing partner on the song, Danny Kortchmar, have both spoken about the song and its lyrics in interviews. The Sunset Grill was a favoured spot of Henley's, while Kortchmar stated that the song makes reference to unease about a changing America that felt less familiar and traditional to Henley and Los Angelenos in general.

== Background ==
The original Sunset Grill was run by owner Joe Froehlich from 1957 to 1997 when he sold the business. The building was torn down, rebuilt and reopened. It is still situated at the same original address on Sunset Boulevard.
