= Lucy Cores =

Russian-American novelist

Lucy Michaella Cores Kortchmar (January 14, 1912 – August 6, 2003) was a Russian-American novelist.

== Biography ==
Born in Moscow, Cores was the daughter of violist Michael Cores and the niece of violinist Alexander Cores. Her family fled the Russian Revolution and arrived in the United States in 1921. She attended the Ethical Culture School and Barnard College.

In 1942, she married Emil Kortchmar, a screw machine parts manufacturer. They had two children, Michael and Daniel. Danny Kortchmar is a professional guitarist.

Cores wrote two mystery novels, Painted for the Kill (1943) and Corpse de Ballet (1944), featuring female protagonist Toni Ney, a former ballet dancer. The second book was dedicated to Cores' friend Olga Ley, the wife of science fiction writer Willy Ley, herself a former ballet dancer and possibly the inspiration for Ney. Cores also wrote the mystery Let's Kill George (1946).

Cores wrote a number of romance and historical novels. Woman in Love (1951) was based on her own experiences. The Mermaid Summer (1971) was set on the island of Martha's Vineyard, where she moved in 1957. The Year of December (1974) was about Claire Clairmont's time in Russia. Destiny's Passion (1978) and Fatal Passion (1989) were historical novels set during the British Regency. A story she published in the Saturday Evening Post about a magazine editor raising seven children was the basis for the television show The New Loretta Young Show.

Cores also wrote science fiction. Her story "Deborah and the Djinn" appeared in the September 1959 issue of Fantastic Universe. Lucy Cores also contributed a story to Beyond Time (1976), an alternate history anthology edited by Willy and Olga Ley's daughter Sandra. The story, "Hail to the Chief", features a President Richard Nixon unhindered by Watergate who remains in office until 1994.

At the time of her death, at age 91, Cores was writing a novel about Alexander Pushkin.
