= Michael Cores =

Russian-American violist

Michael Cores (1885 – June 12, 1934) was a violist.

Born in Kyiv when it was part of the Russian Empire, Cores earned a Doctor of Natural Science degree from Kyiv University and a doctorate from the University of Moscow. He worked as a lawyer before moving to the United States in 1923.

Cores studied music at the Moscow Imperial Conservatory under Jan Hřímalý. He played in the New York Philharmonic under Willem Mengelberg, the NBC Symphony Orchestra under Arturo Toscanini, and the Stringwood Ensemble, a chamber music ensemble.

Cores was the brother of violinist Alexander Cores and the father of novelist Lucy Cores.
