= It Happens All the Time =

2013 album by Megan Hilty

It Happens All The Time

Studio album by Megan Hilty
- Released: March 12, 2013
- Recorded: 2012–13
- Genre: Pop
- Length: 45:11
- Label: Sony Music Entertainment, Masterworks

Singles from It Happens All The Time
- 1. "No Cure"

It Happens All the Time is the debut studio album by American singer Megan Hilty. It was released on March 12, 2013 by Sony Music Entertainment. It debuted at #96 on the Billboard 200 with an estimated 5,000 copies sold in its first week.

== Track listing ==
Standard edition
No.	Title	Writer(s)	Length
1.	"It Happens All the Time"	Glen Ballard, Lauren Pritchard	4:09
2.	"Be a Man"	Andrew Dorff, Katrina Elam, Tommy Lee James	3:34
3.	"No Cure"	Wayne Hector, Jimmy Hogarth, Ben Earle	3:37
4.	"Walk Away"	Carrie Underwood, Luke Laird, Ne-Yo	3:26
5.	"Safe & Sound"	Taylor Swift, Joy Williams, John Paul White, T-Bone Burnett	3:41
6.	"The Blower's Daughter"	Damien Rice	4:34
7.	"Hopin'"	A.C. Burrell, Kevin Ronnie McPherson, Francesca Richard, Trevor Wesley	3:20
8.	"Wise Up"	Aimee Mann	3:23
9.	"The Heart of the Matter"	Mike Campbell, Don Henley, John David Souther	4:24
10.	"Dare You to Move"	Jon Foreman	3:51

Target bonus tracks
No.	Title	Writer(s)	Length
11.	"It Will Rain"	Bruno Mars
12.	"Gravity"	Sara Bareilles

== Chart performance ==
Chart performance for It Happens All the Time
Chart (2013)	Peak position
US Billboard 200	96

== Release history ==
Region	Date	Label	Format(s)
United States	March 12, 2013	Sony, Masterworks	CD, digital download
