= Not Enough Love in the World =

1985 single by Don Henley

Single by Don Henley

from the album Building the Perfect Beast
- B-side: "Man with a Mission"
- Released: May 1985
- Recorded: 1984
- Genre: Soft rock; pop rock
- Length: 3:54
- Label: Geffen
- Songwriters: Don Henley; Danny Kortchmar; Benmont Tench

Don Henley singles chronology
"All She Wants to Do Is Dance" (1985)	"Not Enough Love in the World" (1985)	"Sunset Grill" (1985)

"Not Enough Love in the World" is a soft rock song written by American musicians Don Henley, Danny Kortchmar, and Benmont Tench. The lyrics describe a rocky relationship, with the singer proclaiming he is still in love. It is rumored that it was about Henley's relationship with Stevie Nicks (whom fellow Eagle Joe Walsh later dated), but their relationship only lasted a year.

== History ==
Henley included the song on his second solo studio album Building the Perfect Beast (1984). It was released as a single in 1985 and hit #34 on the Billboard Hot 100. The music video was directed by Timothy Hutton.

The melody of the song was used as the base of the song "Por Ti, Por Mi" by Mexican singer Irán Castillo.

== Critical reception ==
Cashbox said that "this mid-tempo and 'beat-heavy rocker is a perfect vehicle for the ex-Eagle's unique vocals" Billboard characterized the song as being "straight pop with a mild country flavor".

== Personnel ==
- Don Henley – lead and harmony vocals, keyboards, percussion
- Benmont Tench – keyboards
- Danny Kortchmar – guitars
- Tim Drummond – bass
- Ian Wallace – drums

== Chart performance ==
Chart (1985)	Peak position
RPM Adult Contemporary	1
RPM Top Singles	63
US Billboard Hot 100	34
US Adult Contemporary (Billboard)	6
US Mainstream Rock (Billboard)	17

== Cher version ==
"Not Enough Love in the World"

Single by Cher

from the album It's a Man's World
- Released: April 12, 1996
- Recorded: 1995
- Studio: Elephant Studios (London, England)
- Length: 4:24
- Label: WEA
- Songwriters: Don Henley; Danny Kortchmar; Benmont Tench
- Producer: Stephen Lipson

Cher singles chronology
"One by One" (1996)	"Not Enough Love in the World" (1996)	"The Sun Ain't Gonna Shine Anymore" (1996)

Licensed audio
- "Not Enough Love in the World (2023 Remaster)" on YouTube

In 1996, Cher released her version of "Not Enough Love in the World" as the third official European single from her 21st studio album It's a Man's World. The single version is shorter than the album version and is slightly remixed. Allmusic highlighted this cover on her album.

=== Track listing ===
- UK cassette single
1. "Not Enough Love in the World" (Single Edit) – 3:45
2. "One by One" (Sam Ward W Mix) – 4:26
- UK CD single
1. "Not Enough Love in the World" (Single Edit) – 3:45
2. "One by One" (Sam Ward W Mix) – 4:26
3. "One by One" (Junior Vasquez Club Vocal Mix) – 8:45

=== Charts ===
Chart (1996)	Peak position
Scottish Singles Sales (Official Charts)	27
UK Singles (Official Charts)	31
