= Taking You Home =

2000 single by Don Henley

Single by Don Henley

from the album Inside Job
- Released: May 1, 2000
- Length: 5:31 (album version); 4:10 (radio edit)
- Label: Warner Bros.
- Songwriters: Don Henley; Stuart Brawley; Stan Lynch
- Producers: Don Henley; Stan Lynch

Don Henley singles chronology
"Workin' It" (2000)	"Taking You Home" (2000)	"Everything Is Different Now" (2000)

"Taking You Home" is a song by American musician Don Henley from his fourth solo studio album, Inside Job (2000). The track was written by Henley along with Stuart Brawley and Stan Lynch and was serviced to US radio on May 1, 2000, as the album's second single. Worldwide, it served as the album's lead single, as "Workin' It" was a radio-only single in the US. "Taking You Home" was Henley's first and only number one on the US Billboard Adult Contemporary chart as a solo artist, staying at number one for four weeks. It also peaked at number 58 on the Billboard Hot 100 and reached number 93 in the Netherlands.

== Music video ==
The official music video was directed by Tom Krueger and Mary Kay Place.

== Charts ==
=== Weekly charts ===
Chart (2000)	Peak position
Netherlands (Single Top 100)	93
US Billboard Hot 100	58
US Adult Contemporary (Billboard)	1
US Adult Pop Airplay (Billboard)	12

=== Year-end charts ===
Chart (2000)	Position
US Adult Contemporary (Billboard)	10
US Adult Top 40 (Billboard)	33

Chart (2001)	Position
US Adult Contemporary (Billboard)	11

== See also ==
- List of Billboard Adult Contemporary number ones of 2000
