= Dirty Laundry (Don Henley song) =

1982 single by Don Henley

Single by Don Henley

from the album I Can't Stand Still
- B-side: "Lilah"
- Released: October 12, 1982
- Recorded: 1982
- Studio: Record One (Los Angeles, California)
- Genre: Dance rock; synth pop; hard rock
- Length: 5:36
- Label: Asylum
- Songwriters: Don Henley; Danny Kortchmar
- Producers: Don Henley; Danny Kortchmar; Greg Ladanyi

Don Henley singles chronology
"Johnny Can't Read" (1982)	"Dirty Laundry" (1982)	"I Can't Stand Still" (1982)

Dirty Laundry is a song written by American musicians Don Henley and Danny Kortchmar from Henley's debut solo studio album I Can't Stand Still, (1982). The song reached number 1 on the Billboard Top Album Tracks chart in October 1982 prior to being issued as a 45 rpm single. Lyrically, the song describes mass media sensationalism.

Released as the second single from I Can't Stand Still, it spent three weeks at number 3 on the Billboard Hot 100 in early 1983. The single was certified Gold by the Recording Industry Association of America (RIAA) in March 1983, representing sales of a million copies in the United States.

== History ==
The song is about the callousness of network television news reporting as well as the tabloidization of all news. Henley sings from the standpoint of a news presenter who "could have been an actor, but I wound up here". The song's theme is that TV news coverage focuses too much on negative and sensationalist news; in particular, deaths, disasters, and scandals, with little regard to the consequences or for what is important ("We all know that crap is king"). The song was inspired by the intrusive press coverage surrounding the deaths of comedian John Belushi and actress Natalie Wood, and Henley's own arrest in 1980 when he was charged with contributing to the delinquency of a minor and possession of marijuana, cocaine, and Quaaludes after a 16-year-old girl overdosed at his Los Angeles home. The "bubbleheaded bleach blonde" mentioned in the song was rumored to have been Christine Lundstedt (Christine Lund) of KABC-TV in Los Angeles, but Henley has categorically denied this.

Among the musicians on the record were Timothy B. Schmit and Joe Walsh, two of Henley's bandmates in the Eagles. Walsh performs the first guitar solo, followed by Steve Lukather of the rock band Toto; the guitar basic tracks are played by Danny Kortchmar who also helped Henley compose this song. The sleeve notes also mention musicians George Gruel, Roger Linn and Steve Porcaro.

Although an official music video was never made, Global News produced a parody video in 1985 (credited to the "News Brothers", all Global News reporters) featuring the song.

== Versions ==
The original vinyl LP version is a slightly different mix from the single version, which is the version commonly released on CD. They run about the same duration. There is also a German 7" single with a unique 4:40 edit.

Among the differences in the single version are added keyboards on the intro, no teleprinter noises at 1:32 and 3:29, a slightly longer delay on the vocal echo throughout the song, a slightly different vocal take on the line "you don't really want to know just how far it's gone" at 3:00, removed or quieted guitar chord on the down beats during the verses at 1:57–2:14 and 2:55–3:13, and a differently panned and slightly louder telephone ringer noise at 3:36 & 5:17–end.

== Personnel ==
- Don Henley – lead vocals, backing vocals
- Steve Porcaro – special keyboard effects
- Roger Linn – Linn LM-1 (credited with "special effects")
- Danny Kortchmar – organ, synthesizer, rhythm guitar, backing vocals
- Joe Walsh – 1st guitar solo
- Steve Lukather – 2nd guitar solo
- Timothy B. Schmit – bass guitar, backing vocals
- Jeff Porcaro – drums
- George Gruel – backing vocals

== Chart performance ==
=== Weekly charts ===
Chart (1982–1983)	Peak position
Australia (Kent Music Report)	51
Austrian Top 40	8
Canadian RPM Top Singles	1
Canada (The Record)	1
New Zealand (RIANZ)	7
South African Singles	2
UK singles chart	59
US Billboard Hot 100	3
US Billboard Top Rock Tracks	1
US Cash Box Top 100	5

=== Year-end charts ===
Chart (1982)	Rank
Canada	30
US Cash Box	34

Chart (1983)	Rank
US Top Pop Singles (Billboard)	48

== Certifications ==
Region	Certification	Certified units/sales
United States (RIAA)	Gold	1,000,000^{^}
^{^} Shipments figures based on certification alone.

== See also ==
- Don Henley discography
- List of Billboard Mainstream Rock number-one songs of the 1980s
- Narcotizing dysfunction
- Yellow journalism
