= The Last Worthless Evening =

Single by Don Henley

from the album The End of the Innocence
- B-side: "Gimme What You Got"
- Released: September 1989
- Recorded: 1988
- Genre: Rock, soft rock
- Length: 6:03 (album version); 4:30 (single version)
- Label: Geffen
- Songwriters: John Corey, Don Henley, Stan Lynch
- Producers: Don Henley, Mike Campbell, John Corey

Don Henley singles chronology
"The End of the Innocence" (1989)	"The Last Worthless Evening" (1989)	"The Heart of the Matter" (1990)

"The Last Worthless Evening" is a song written by John Corey, Don Henley, and Stan Lynch. It was a single recorded by Henley in 1989 that reached number 21 on the US Billboard Hot 100 chart. The song was included on Henley's third album The End of the Innocence that same year.

== Reception ==
The Los Angeles Times described the song as "a romantic plea to move on from the hurt of old relationships." The Washington Post called the song an "intriguing ... hard-edged love ballad." The track was one of the reasons that the Yardbarker named the song's album as one of the top 25 solo albums to come from the former member of a "legendary band" in 2023.

== Performances ==
Henley played the song during his appearance on Saturday Night Live on October 28, 1989.

== Personnel ==
- Don Henley – vocals, drums
- John Corey – keyboards, guitars
- Mike Campbell – additional guitars
- Bob Glaub – bass
- Stan Lynch – percussion

== Chart performance ==
Chart (1989)	Peak position
Canada Top Singles (RPM)	5
Canada Adult Contemporary (RPM)	3
US Billboard Hot 100	21
US Adult Contemporary (Billboard)	5
US Mainstream Rock (Billboard)	4

== See also ==
- The End of the Innocence (album)
