= The End of the Innocence (album) =

Studio album by Don Henley
- Released: June 27, 1989
- Recorded: 1987–1989
- Studios: A&M (Hollywood); The Complex (Los Angeles)
- Genres: Rock; hard rock; soft rock
- Length: 53:11
- Label: Geffen
- Producers: Don Henley; Mike Campbell; John Corey; Bruce Hornsby; Danny Kortchmar; Stan Lynch

Don Henley chronology
Building the Perfect Beast (1984)	The End of the Innocence (1989)	Actual Miles: Henley's Greatest Hits (1995)

Singles from The End of the Innocence
- 1. "The End of the Innocence" Released: June 1989; 2. "The Last Worthless Evening" Released: September 1989 (US); 3. "New York Minute" Released: October 1989 (UK); 4. "The Heart of the Matter" Released: February 1990; 5. "How Bad Do You Want It?" Released: June 1990

Professional ratings
Review scores
Source	Rating
AllMusic	4/5 stars
Robert Christgau	C+

The End of the Innocence is the third solo studio album by Don Henley, the co-lead vocalist and drummer for the Eagles. The album was released in 1989, on Geffen Records, and was his last release on that label. It was also his last solo album before reforming the Eagles and it would be eleven years before he released another solo project, 2000's Inside Job.

The album is Henley's best selling release, selling over 6 million copies in the United States alone, peaking at No. 8. The album featured three Top 40 singles "The End of the Innocence", "The Heart of the Matter", and "The Last Worthless Evening". Those singles reached No. 8, No. 21, and No. 21 respectively. The album also featured "New York Minute" which reached No. 48 on the charts and was later recorded by Henley and the Eagles for their live album Hell Freezes Over in 1994. Henley won another Grammy and an MTV Video Music Award nomination for the title track. In 2012, the album was ranked at number 389 on the Rolling Stone magazine's list of the 500 greatest albums of all time.

== Background ==
The song "I Will Not Go Quietly" features harmony vocals by Guns N' Roses singer Axl Rose, who at the time was also on the same label.

== Critical reception ==
Rolling Stone magazine wrote of the album at the time, "Returning to the theme of 'Desperado,' the former Eagle hitched some of his finest melodies (especially on the gentle title track) to sharply focused lyrical studies of men in troubled transition – from youth to adulthood, innocence to responsibility."

Reviewing retrospectively for AllMusic, critic Vik Iyengar has written of the album, "Henley took some time before completing his highly anticipated third album, The End of the Innocence. Although he manages to duplicate much of the magic of his previous album, Henley has backed off of the synthesizers and expanded his musical palette." He also added that "Throughout the album, he manages to balance being cynical yet hopeful, and his great melodies allow his poignant lyrics to penetrate. This album is highly recommended for those who like their pop music with a message."

== Track listing ==
No.	Title	Writer(s)	Length
1.	"The End of the Innocence"	Henley, Bruce Hornsby	5:16
2.	"How Bad Do You Want It?"	Henley, Danny Kortchmar, Stan Lynch	3:47
3.	"I Will Not Go Quietly" (featuring Axl Rose)	Henley, Kortchmar	5:43
4.	"The Last Worthless Evening"	John Corey, Henley, Lynch	6:03
5.	"New York Minute"	Henley, Kortchmar, Jai Winding	6:37
6.	"Shangri-La"	Henley, Steve Jordan, Kortchmar	4:55
7.	"Little Tin God"	Henley, Kortchmar, JD Souther	4:42
8.	"Gimme What You Got"	Corey, Henley, Lynch	6:10
9.	"If Dirt Were Dollars"	Henley, Kortchmar, Souther	4:34
10.	"The Heart of the Matter"	Mike Campbell, Henley, Souther	5:24

== Personnel ==
- Don Henley – vocals, drums (1, 4), backing vocals (6, 9), harmony vocals (6, 7)
- Bruce Hornsby – acoustic piano (1), keyboards (1)
- Jai Winding – keyboard bass (1), keyboards (5), additional keyboards (6)
- John Corey – keyboards (4), guitars (4, 8), bass (8)
- David Paich – acoustic piano (5), string arrangements (5), additional keyboards (7)
- Danny Kortchmar – guitars (2, 3, 5–7, 9), bass (2, 3, 9), drums (2, 3, 7, 9), guitar solo (3), keyboards (5–7), lead guitar (8)
- Waddy Wachtel – acoustic guitar (3)
- Mike Campbell – additional guitars (4), keyboards (10), guitars (10)
- Bob Glaub – bass (4)
- Pino Palladino – bass (5–7)
- Larry Klein – bass (10)
- Jeff Porcaro – drums (5)
- Steve Jordan – drums (6), wah wah guitar (6), backing vocals (6)
- Michael Fisher – percussion (1)
- Stan Lynch – percussion (4, 9, 10), guitars (8), bass (8), drums (8, 10)
- Jim Keltner – additional percussion (6)
- Wayne Shorter – soprano sax solo (1)
- Steve Madaio – trumpet solo (5)
- Valerie Carter – harmony vocals (2)
- Patty Smyth – harmony vocals (2)
- Axl Rose – harmony vocals (3)
- Take 6 – backing vocals (5, 6)
- Charley Drayton – backing vocals (6)
- Ivan Neville – backing vocals (6)
- Edie Brickell – backing vocals (8)
- Melissa Etheridge – backing vocals (8)
- Sheryl Crow – backing vocals (9)
- JD Souther – backing vocals (9)
- Carmen Twillie – backing vocals (10)
- Julia Waters – backing vocals (10)
- Maxine Waters – backing vocals (10)

Production

- Producers – Don Henley; Bruce Hornsby (track 1); Danny Kortchmar (tracks 2, 3, 5–7, 9 & 10); John Corey (tracks 4 & 8); Stan Lynch (tracks 4 & 8); Mike Campbell (track 10).
- Engineer – Shelly Yakus
- Basic track recording (tracks 5, 7 & 9) – Greg Ladanyi
- Assistant engineer – Brian Scheuble
- Additional engineers – Marc DeSisto, Rob Jacobs, Eddie King, Mark McKenna and Bob Vogt.
- Technicians – Dale Asamoto, Stephen Barncard, Bob Borbonus, Fred Bova, Jonathan Little, Lars Lyons, Gary Mannon, Mike Morengell, Gary Myerberg and Mark Opie.
- Additional assistant technicians – Tom Banghart, Greg Goodman, Ed Goodreau, Randy Staub and Randall Wine.
- Mixing – Shelly Yakus and Rob Jacobs
- Mix assistant – Robert "R.J." Jaczko
- Mastered by Stephen Marcussen at Precision Lacquer (Los Angeles, CA).
- Art direction – Jeri Heiden
- Front cover photo – Ken Nahoum
- Back cover photo – Stephen Danelian
- Inner sleeve photos – Stephen Danelian and Albert Tolot

== Charts ==
=== Weekly charts ===
Chart (1989-1990)	Peak position
Australian Albums (ARIA)	40
Canada Top Albums/CDs (RPM)	8
Dutch Albums (Album Top 100)	60
Finnish Albums (The Official Finnish Charts)	16
German Albums (Offizielle Top 100)	87
Japanese Albums (Oricon)	48
New Zealand Albums (RMNZ)	37
Norwegian Albums (VG-lista)	15
Swedish Albums (Sverigetopplistan)	11
UK Albums (Official Charts)	17
US Billboard 200	8

=== Year-end charts ===
Chart (1989)	Position
Canada Top Albums/CDs (RPM)	34
US Billboard 200	57
Chart (1990)	Position
US Billboard 200	8

== Certifications ==
Region	Certification	Certified units/sales
Canada (Music Canada)	2× Platinum	200,000^{^}
United Kingdom (BPI)	Gold	100,000^{^}
United States (RIAA)	6× Platinum	6,000,000^{^}
^{^} Shipments figures based on certification alone.

== Awards ==
Grammy Awards

Year	Winner	Category
1989	The End of the Innocence	Best Male Rock Vocal Performance
