= The Heart of the Matter (song) =

Song by Don Henley, Mike Campbell and JD Souther

- Cassette single artwork

Single by Don Henley

from the album The End of the Innocence
- B-side: "Little Tin God"
- Released: February 1990
- Recorded: 1988
- Genre: Rock
- Length: 5:21 (Album Version); 3:53 (Edited Version)
- Label: Geffen
- Songwriters: Mike Campbell, Don Henley, JD Souther
- Producers: Mike Campbell, Don Henley, Danny Kortchmar

Don Henley singles chronology
"The Last Worthless Evening" (1989)	"The Heart of the Matter" (1990)	"How Bad Do You Want It?" (1990)

"The Heart of the Matter"

Single by India.Arie

from the album Testimony: Vol. 1, Life & Relationship
- Released: September 4, 2006 (U.S. smooth jazz radio)
- Recorded: 2006
- Genre: R&B; soul
- Length: 5:15
- Label: Motown
- Songwriters: Mike Campbell; Don Henley; JD Souther
- Producers: India.Arie; Frank "Blame" Macek

India.Arie singles chronology
"There's Hope" (2006)	"The Heart of the Matter" (2006)	"Beautiful Flower" (2007)

"The Heart of the Matter" is a song recorded by American rock singer Don Henley from his third solo studio album, The End of the Innocence (1989). Written by Henley, Mike Campbell, and JD Souther and produced by Henley, Campbell, and Danny Kortchmar, the song was released as the album's third single, reaching No. 21 on the Billboard Hot 100 and No. 2 on the Mainstream Rock Tracks in early 1990.

In 1994 Henley, along with the Eagles, played an acoustic version of the song at their reunion concert; the performance was omitted from the Hell Freezes Over live CD, but was included in the concert DVD.

The song was covered by American soul singer India.Arie in 2006 on her third studio album, Testimony: Vol. 1, Life & Relationship. Her version of the song is used in the second episode of Brothers & Sisters, entitled "An Act of Will", and in the theatrical trailer for the 2008 film adaptation of Sex and the City. It is also played briefly in a scene of the film.

Stage and television actress Megan Hilty recorded a cover on her 2013 debut solo album It Happens All the Time.

Canadian singer Nikki Yanofsky recorded a live acoustic cover for her 2010 DVD Live in Montreal.

== Composition ==
In a November 2003 interview with Songfacts, Tom Petty and the Heartbreakers guitarist and songwriter Mike Campbell explained the song's origins:

I cut the track at home and played it for him (Don Henley). He wrote some words, I think he got some help from JD Souther on some of the lyrics. He changed the key to fit his voice, then we went in and basically recreated the demo. I know he was especially proud of that one. He told me that lyric was something he had been trying to write for a long time and it finally came out the way he liked it, something he really wanted to sing. A lot of people like that song. A lot of girls like it.

== Personnel ==
- Don Henley – lead vocals
- Mike Campbell – keyboards, guitars
- Larry Klein – bass
- Stan Lynch – drums, percussion
- Carmen Twillie – backing vocals
- Julia Waters – backing vocals
- Maxine Waters – backing vocals

== Charts ==
=== Don Henley version ===
Weekly charts

Chart (1990)	Peak position
Canada Top Singles (RPM)	7
Canada Adult Contemporary (RPM)	8
US Billboard Hot 100	21
US Adult Contemporary (Billboard)	3
US Mainstream Rock Airplay (Billboard)	2
US Cash Box Top 100	18

Year-end charts

Chart (1990)	Position
Canada Top Singles (RPM)	51

=== India.Arie version ===
Chart (2006)	Peak position
US Smooth Jazz Songs (Billboard)	7
Chart (2008)	Peak position
Canada (Canadian Hot 100)	33
Sweden (Sverigetopplistan)	46
UK Singles (OCC)	79
