= Building the Perfect Beast =

Studio album by Don Henley
- Released: November 19, 1984
- Recorded: 1983–1984
- Studios: Record One (Sherman Oaks); Bill Schnee (Universal City); The Villa (North Hollywood)
- Genres: Electronic rock; pop rock; soft rock; new wave
- Length: 47:08 (CD and cassette versions)
- Label: Geffen
- Producers: Don Henley; Danny Kortchmar; Greg Ladanyi; Mike Campbell

Don Henley chronology
I Can't Stand Still (1982)	Building the Perfect Beast (1984)	The End of the Innocence (1989)

Singles from Building the Perfect Beast
- 1. "The Boys of Summer" Released: October 1984; 2. "All She Wants to Do Is Dance" Released: February 1985; 3. "Not Enough Love in the World" Released: May 1985; 4. "Sunset Grill" Released: August 1985

Building the Perfect Beast is the second solo studio album by American rock singer Don Henley, released on November 19, 1984, by Geffen Records. A commercial and critical success, it is generally regarded as the culmination of the smoother, more adult-oriented sound of Henley's solo work.

As with his debut solo studio album I Can't Stand Still (1982), Henley collaborated primarily with guitarist Danny Kortchmar, along with members of the then current line-up of Tom Petty and the Heartbreakers, who contributed to the writing of the songs: guitarist Mike Campbell, keyboardist Benmont Tench and drummer Stan Lynch, the last of whom would later collaborate with Henley on composing the Eagles' song "Learn to Be Still", which was released on their second live album Hell Freezes Over (1994). The album also features contributions from Toto's keyboardists Steve Porcaro and David Paich, Fleetwood Mac's lead guitarist and co-lead vocalist, Lindsey Buckingham, the Go-Go's lead vocalist Belinda Carlisle, Scandal's lead vocalist Patty Smyth, the Motels' lead vocalist Martha Davies, one half of Sam & Dave, Sam Moore, Eagles' associate JD Souther and features contributions from Randy Newman, Michael Boddicker, Jim Keltner, Waddy Wachtel, Pino Palladino, Charlie Sexton, and Ian Wallace.

The album reached No. 13 on the U.S. Billboard 200 and was certified 3× Platinum by the Recording Industry Association of America (RIAA). The album spawned four singles which all reached the Top 40 on the Billboard Hot 100, including "The Boys of Summer", which would become one of Henley's most popular songs and win him numerous awards, including a Grammy Award and four MTV Video Music Awards.

== Critical reception ==
Professional ratings
Review scores
Source	Rating
AllMusic	4.5/5 stars
Robert Christgau	B

Reviewing the album in Rolling Stone, Kurt Loder wrote that "Building the Perfect Beast is a meticulously crafted and programmed set of songs about love and politics. The first side is given to personal reflections on love and loss, such as the wistful 'Boys of Summer.' Side two is more issue-oriented, tackling subjects from genetic engineering ('Building the Perfect Beast') to America's reckless foreign policy ('All She Wants to Do Is Dance'). The album's longest and most ambitious piece, 'Sunset Grill,' describes in disturbingly vivid images a character's sense of entrapment in an evil, convulsive metropolis: 'You see a lot more meanness in the city/It's the kind that eats you up inside/Hard to come away with anything that feels like dignity.'" The magazine placed the album at No. 73 on its 1989 list of the "100 Best Albums of the Eighties".

Reviewing retrospectively for AllMusic, critic Vik Iyengar has written of the album, "After experimenting with synthesizers and a pop sound on his solo debut, Don Henley hits the mark on his sophomore release, Building the Perfect Beast. This album established Henley as an artist in his own right after many successful years with the Eagles, as it spawned numerous hits."

== Release ==
=== Japanese reissue ===
The original mix of the album was reissued in Japan in a replica of the original compact disc artwork. The album was remastered, for this reissue using Direct Stream Digital (DSD) to transfer the digital files. The release was a limited edition in the SHM-CD format.

== Track listing ==
Side one
No.	Title	Writer(s)	Length
1.	"The Boys of Summer"	Don Henley; Mike Campbell	4:48
2.	"You Can't Make Love"	Henley; Danny Kortchmar	3:34
3.	"Man with a Mission"	Henley; Kortchmar; JD Souther	2:43
4.	"You're Not Drinking Enough"	Kortchmar	4:40
5.	"Not Enough Love in the World"	Henley; Kortchmar; Benmont Tench	3:54

Side two
No.	Title	Writer(s)	Length
6.	"Building the Perfect Beast"	Henley; Kortchmar	4:59
7.	"All She Wants to Do Is Dance"	Kortchmar	4:28
8.	"A Month of Sundays"	Henley	4:30
9.	"Sunset Grill"	Henley; Kortchmar; Tench	6:22
10.	"Drivin' with Your Eyes Closed"	Henley; Kortchmar; Stan Lynch	3:41
11.	"Land of the Living"	Henley; Kortchmar	3:24
Total length:			47:08

Note: "A Month of Sundays" appeared on the cassette and compact disc versions of the album, but was not included on the LP format. On vinyl it was released as the B-side of the single "The Boys of Summer."

In 2024 the album was remastered on 2LP. Including "A Month Of Sundays" on the tracklist for the first time on the LP format.

== Personnel ==
=== Musicians ===
- Don Henley – lead vocals, harmony vocals (2, 5, 7, 11) drums (2–4, 7, 8), keyboards (5), percussion (5, 6, 10), synthesizers (6), chant voices (6), synthesizer arrangements (9)
- Danny Kortchmar – synthesizers (1, 3, 6), guitars (1–7, 9–11), horns (3), organ (4), Omnichord (4), percussion (6, 10, 11), chant voices (6), guitar synthesizer solo (9), horn solo (9), synthesizer arrangements (9), keyboards (10), bass (10), arrangements (11)
- Mike Campbell – synthesizers (1), guitars (1), percussion (1)
- Steve Porcaro – synthesizers (1, 4), programming (7)
- Benmont Tench – keyboards (2, 5), acoustic piano (8), synthesizers (9), synthesizer arrangements (9)
- David Paich – acoustic piano (4), synthesizers (7, 8), synthesizer arrangements (8), acoustic piano solo (9)
- Michael Boddicker – programming (6), sequencing (6), synthesizers (8, 9), E-mu Emulator (9), synthesizer arrangements (9)
- Albhy Galuten – Synclavier (6)
- Randy Newman – synthesizers (8), synthesizer arrangements (8, 9)
- Bill Cuomo – synthesizers (11), programming (11), percussion (11)
- Lindsey Buckingham – guitars (2), harmony vocals (2)
- Charlie Sexton – guitars (3)
- Larry Klein – bass (1)
- Pino Palladino – bass (2, 9, 11)
- Tim Drummond – bass (4, 5)
- Ian Wallace – drums (5)
- Kevin McCormick – African drums (6)
- Jim Keltner – additional drums (8)
- Maren Jensen – intro and interlude composer (8)
- Jerry Hey – horn arrangements (9)
- Belinda Carlisle – harmony vocals (3)
- Sam Moore – harmony vocals (4)
- Martha Davis – chant voices (6), harmony vocals (7)
- Michael O'Donahue – chant voices (6)
- Carla Olson – chant voices (6)
- Patty Smyth – chant voices (6), harmony vocals (6, 7, 9, 11)
- JD Souther – chant voices (6)
- Waddy Wachtel – chant voices (6)
- Marie-Pascale Elfman – the French Girls ensemble (10)
- Dominique Mancinelli – the French Girls ensemble (10)

=== Technical ===
- Producers – Don Henley, Danny Kortchmar and Greg Ladanyi (all tracks); Mike Campbell (Track 1).
- Recorded and mixed by Niko Bolas and Greg Ladanyi
- Additional engineers – Niko Bolas, Richard Bosworth and Tom Knox.
- Assistant engineers – Richard Bosworth, Dan Garcia, David Schober and Duane Seykora.
- Horns on track 9 recorded by Allen Sides, assisted by Mark Ettel.
- Mastered by Mike Reese and Doug Sax at The Mastering Lab (Hollywood, California).
- Graphic coordinator – Jeri McManus
- Art direction – Don Henley, Maren Jensen and Jeri McManus.
- Photography – Herb Ritts

== Charts ==
=== Weekly charts ===
Chart (1984–1985)	Peak position
Australian Albums (Kent Music Report)	4
Canada Top Albums/CDs (RPM)	17
Dutch Albums (Album Top 100)	23
German Albums (Offizielle Top 100)	28
Japanese Albums (Oricon)	49
New Zealand Albums (RMNZ)	18
Norwegian Albums (VG-lista)	15
Swedish Albums (Sverigetopplistan)	24
UK Albums (Official Charts)	14
US Billboard 200	13

=== Year-end charts ===
Chart (1985)	Position
Canada Top Albums/CDs (RPM)	42
US Billboard 200	13

== Certifications ==
Region	Certification	Certified units/sales
United Kingdom (BPI)	Silver	60,000^{^}
United States (RIAA)	3× Platinum	3,000,000^{^}
^{^} Shipments figures based on certification alone.

== Awards ==
Grammy Awards

Year	Winner	Category
1985	"The Boys of Summer"	Best Male Rock Vocal Performance
