= The End of the Innocence (song) =

1989 single by Don Henley

Single by Don Henley

from the album The End of the Innocence
- B-side: "If Dirt Were Dollars"
- Released: June 6, 1989
- Genre: Heartland rock
- Length: 5:16
- Label: Geffen
- Songwriter: Don Henley · Bruce Hornsby
- Producer: Don Henley · Bruce Hornsby

Don Henley singles chronology
| "Sunset Grill" (1985) | "The End of the Innocence" (1989) | "I Will Not Go Quietly" (1989) |

"The End of the Innocence" is the lead single and title track from Don Henley's third solo studio album of the same name, released in 1989. Henley co-wrote and co-produced the song with Bruce Hornsby, who also performed piano. Both artists regularly include the song in their live performances. The single peaked at number eight on the US Billboard Hot 100, becoming his fifth solo top-10 hit on the chart. "The End of the Innocence" also became Henley's fourth number-one single on the Album Rock Tracks chart. In Canada, it reached number three on the RPM Top Singles and Adult Contemporary charts.

At the 32nd Grammy Awards in 1990, the song received Grammy nominations for Record of the Year and Song of the Year. The song won the Grammy for Best Rock Vocal Performance, Male.

== Music video ==
The black-and-white music video for the song was directed by David Fincher and earned Henley an MTV Video Music Award for Best Male Video in 1990.

Henley intended that there would be two political comments in the video:

- At the line "they're beating plowshares into swords, for this tired old man that we elected king," a series of campaign posters of U.S. President Ronald Reagan is shown.
- At the line "lawyers clean up all details," a television set playing the congressional testimony of Oliver North appears on-screen.

The video directly refers to the work of Robert Frank's The Americans.

== Personnel ==
- Don Henley – vocals, drums
- Bruce Hornsby – acoustic piano, additional keyboards
- Jai Winding – keyboard bass
- Michael Fisher – percussion
- Wayne Shorter – soprano sax solo

== Charts ==
=== Weekly charts ===
| Chart (1989–1990) | Peak position |
|---|---|
| Australia (ARIA) | 54 |
| Canada Top Singles (RPM) | 3 |
| Canada Adult Contemporary (RPM) | 3 |
| Italy Airplay (Music & Media) | 13 |
| Netherlands (Dutch Top 40 Tipparade) | 17 |
| Netherlands (Single Top 100) | 70 |
| UK Singles (Official Charts) | 48 |
| US Billboard Hot 100 | 8 |
| US Adult Contemporary (Billboard) | 2 |
| US Mainstream Rock (Billboard) | 1 |
| West Germany (GfK) | 54 |

=== Year-end charts ===
| Chart (1989) | Position |
|---|---|
| Canada Top Singles (RPM) | 15 |
| US Billboard Hot 100 | 99 |
| US Adult Contemporary (Billboard) | 12 |
| US Album Rock Tracks (Billboard) | 21 |

== See also ==
- Ronald Reagan in music
