= Don Henley =

American musician and songwriter (born 1947)

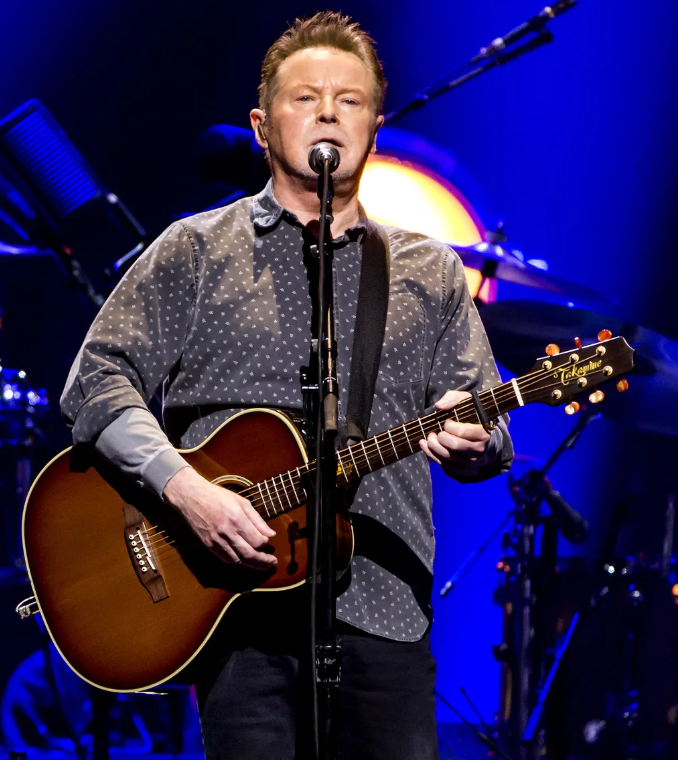
- Henley performing with the Eagles in 2019

Background information
- Born: Donald Hugh Henley; July 22, 1947 (age 79); Gilmer, Texas, U.S.
- Origin: Linden, Texas, U.S.
- Genres: Rock; country rock; pop rock; hard rock
- Occupations: Singer; songwriter; musician
- Instruments: Vocals; drums; guitar
- Works: Solo; with the Eagles
- Years active: 1970–present
- Labels: Asylum; Geffen; Warner Bros.; Capitol
- Member of: Eagles
- Spouse: Sharon Summerall (m. 1995)
- Partner: Stevie Nicks (1977–1978)
- Website: donhenley.com

Donald Hugh Henley (born July 22, 1947) is an American singer, songwriter and musician. He is a founding member of the Eagles, serving as a songwriter, drummer, and vocalist for the band. Henley sang lead vocals on Eagles songs such as "Witchy Woman", "Desperado", "Best of My Love", "One of These Nights", "Hotel California", "Life in the Fast Lane", and "The Long Run". The Eagles disbanded in 1980, but reunited in 1994. Following the death of co-founder Glenn Frey in 2016, Henley became the Eagles' only remaining consistent founding member.

After the Eagles' 1980 breakup, Henley pursued a solo career and released his debut studio album I Can't Stand Still in 1982. As a solo artist, he has released five studio albums, two compilation albums, and one live DVD. Henley's notable solo tracks include "Dirty Laundry", "The Boys of Summer", "All She Wants to Do Is Dance", "Not Enough Love in the World", "Sunset Grill", "New York Minute", "The End of the Innocence", "The Last Worthless Evening", "The Heart of the Matter", and "Taking You Home".

The Eagles have sold over 150 million albums worldwide; won six Grammy Awards; and charted five number one singles, 17 top 40 singles, and six number one albums. The band was inducted into the Rock and Roll Hall of Fame in 1998 and is the highest-selling American band in history. As a solo artist, Henley has sold over 10 million albums worldwide, had eight top 40 singles, and won two Grammy Awards and five MTV Video Music Awards. In 2008, he was ranked as the 87th-greatest singer of all time by Rolling Stone.

Henley has also played a founding role in several environmental and political causes, including the Walden Woods Project.

== Early life ==
Donald Hugh Henley was born on July 22, 1947 in Gilmer, Texas, and grew up in the small northeast Texas town of Linden. He is the son of Hughlene (née McWhorter; 1916–2003) and Con Junell "C. J." Henley (1907–1972), and has English, Scottish, and Irish ancestry. Henley attended Linden-Kildare High School, where he initially played football; due to his relatively small build, Henley's coach suggested that he quit, and he joined the high school band instead. Henley first played the trombone, then moved to the percussion section.

After graduating from high school in 1965, Henley attended Stephen F. Austin State University in Nacogdoches, then North Texas State University in Denton from 1967 to 1969. He left school to spend time with his father, who was dying of cardiovascular and arterial disease.

== Musical career ==
=== Early career ===
While still at high school, Henley was asked to join a Dixieland jazz band formed by his childhood friend Richard Bowden's father Elmer, together with another school friend Jerry Surratt. They then formed a band called the Four Speeds. In 1964 the band was renamed Felicity and went through a number of changes in band personnel. As Felicity they were signed to a local producer and released a Henley-penned song called "Hurtin'". In 1969, they met by chance fellow Texan Kenny Rogers who took an interest in their band. They changed their name to Shiloh and recorded a few songs for Rogers, and "Jennifer (O' My Lady)" was released as their first single.

Surratt died in a dirt bike accident just before their single was released. The band members then became Henley, Richard Bowden and his cousin Michael Bowden, Al Perkins and Jim Ed Norman. Rogers helped sign the band to independent label Amos Records, and brought the band to Los Angeles, California, in June 1970. They recorded an eponymous studio album produced by Rogers at Larrabee Sound Studios while living at the home of Rogers for a few months. Shiloh broke-up in 1971 over the band's leadership and creative differences between Henley and Bowden.

In Los Angeles, Henley met Glenn Frey as they were both signed to the same label (Frey was signed to Amos Records, together with JD Souther, as the duo Longbranch Pennywhistle), and they were recruited by John Boylan to be members of Linda Ronstadt's backup band for her tour in 1971. Touring with her was the catalyst for forming a group, as Henley and Frey decided to form their own band. They were joined by Randy Meisner and Bernie Leadon who also played in Ronstadt's backing band (the four had, however, played together only once previously, as the band personnel changed) and became the Eagles.

=== Eagles ===
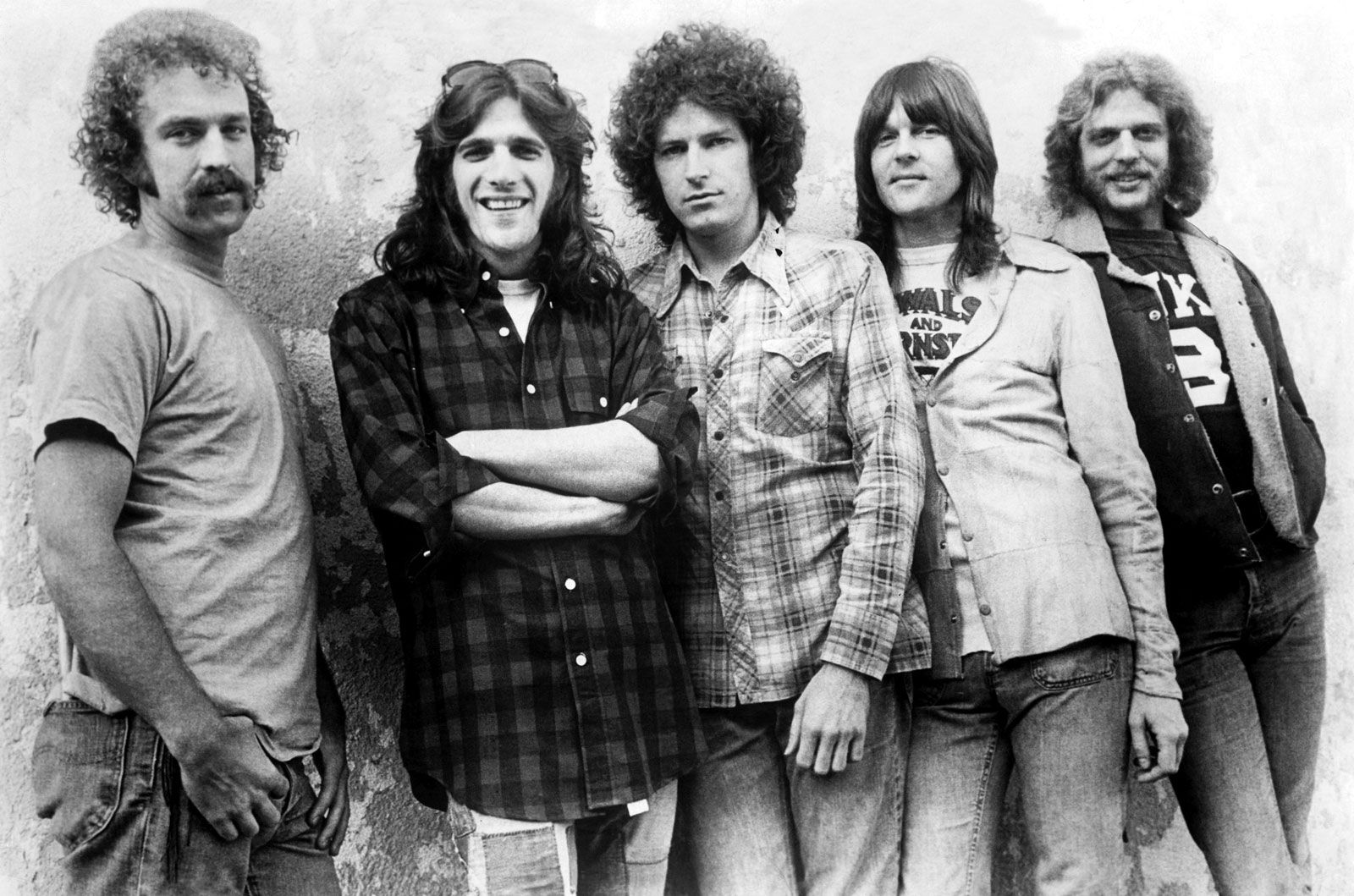
Henley (center) with the Eagles c. 1974

The Eagles were formed in 1971. Henley is a founding member, drummer, and vocalist of the band. The band signed a recording contract with David Geffen's label Asylum Records. They released their debut eponymous studio album in 1972, which contained the hit song "Take It Easy", co-written by Jackson Browne. During the band's run, Henley co-wrote (usually with Frey) most of the band's best-known songs. "Witchy Woman", which was co-written with Leadon, was his first commercially successful song, while "Desperado" marks the beginning of his songwriting partnership with Frey.

Henley sang lead vocals on many of the band's popular songs, including "Desperado", "Witchy Woman", "Best of My Love", "One of These Nights", "Hotel California", "The Long Run" and "Life in the Fast Lane". The Eagles won numerous Grammy Awards during the 1970s and became one of the most successful rock bands of all time. They are also among the top five overall bestselling bands of all time in America, and the highest-selling American band in U.S. history.

The band broke up in 1980, following a difficult tour and personal tensions that arose during the recording of their sixth studio album, The Long Run (1979). They reunited 14 years later in 1994. Their most recent studio album, Long Road Out of Eden, was released in 2007. The band had a number of highly successful tours, such as the Hell Freezes Over Tour (1994–1996) and Long Road Out of Eden Tour. On April 1, 2013, during a concert at the Casino Rama in Rama, Ontario, Canada, Henley announced the History of the Eagles – Live in Concert tour, which began in July 2013 and ended in July 2015, six months before Frey's death. At the 58th Annual Grammy Awards, the Eagles and Jackson Browne performed "Take It Easy" as a tribute to Frey.

Frey's death left Henley as the only founding member of Eagles who was still in the band.

On his songwriting in the band, Henley stated in a March 2001 interview on Charlie Rose that "rock bands work best as a benevolent dictatorship", with the principal songwriters in a band (in the case of Eagles, "me and Glenn Frey") being the ones that will likely hold the power.

=== Solo career ===
Following the initial break-up of the Eagles, Henley embarked on a solo career. He and Stevie Nicks (his girlfriend at the time) had duetted on her top 10 pop and adult contemporary hit "Leather and Lace" in 1981, written by Nicks for Waylon Jennings and his wife Jessi Colter, in late 1980. Henley's debut solo studio album, I Can't Stand Still (1982), was a moderate seller. The single "Dirty Laundry" reached No. 3 on the Billboard Hot 100 at the beginning of 1983 and earned a Gold-certified single for sales of over a million copies in the U.S. It was Henley's all-time biggest solo hit single, and also was nominated for a Grammy Award. Henley also contributed the song "Love Rules" to the coming-of-age comedy film Fast Times at Ridgemont High (1982).

This was followed in 1984 by the studio album, Building the Perfect Beast. A single release, "The Boys of Summer", reached No. 5 on the Billboard Hot 100. The music video for the song was directed by Jean-Baptiste Mondino and won several MTV Video Music Awards including Best Video of the Year. Henley also won the Grammy Award for Best Male Rock Vocal Performance for the song. Several other songs on the album, "All She Wants to Do Is Dance" (No. 9 on Hot 100), "Not Enough Love in the World" (No. 34) and "Sunset Grill" (No. 22) also received considerable airplay. He then had a No. 3 Album Rock Tracks chart hit with "Who Owns This Place?" from the sports drama film The Color of Money (1986).

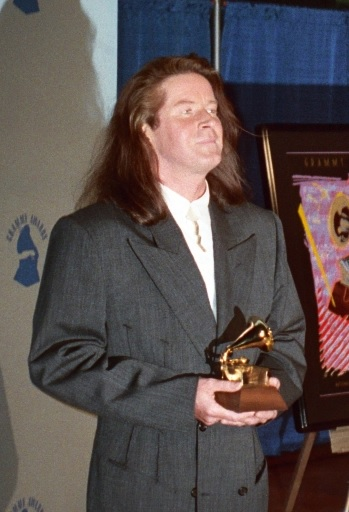
Henley receiving a Grammy Award in 1990

Henley's third studio album, The End of the Innocence (1989), was even more successful. The album's title track, a collaboration with Bruce Hornsby, reached No. 8 as a single. "The Heart of the Matter", "The Last Worthless Evening" and "New York Minute" were among other songs that gained radio airplay. Henley again won the Grammy Award for Best Male Rock Vocal Performance in 1990 for "The End of the Innocence". Also in 1990, Henley made a brief appearance on MTV's Unplugged series.

In 1995, Henley released the single "The Garden of Allah" to promote his solo greatest hits compilation album Actual Miles: Henley's Greatest Hits.

MusicRadar called Henley one of the greatest singing drummers of all time.

In live shows, Henley plays drums and sings simultaneously on some Eagles songs. On his solo songs and other Eagles songs, he plays electric guitar and simultaneously sings or just sings solo. Occasionally Eagles songs would get drastic rearrangements, such as "Hotel California" with four trombones.

=== Lawsuits with Geffen Records ===
Henley spent many years in legal entanglements with Geffen Records. In January 1993, following prolonged tensions between Henley and the label, the dispute went public and the record company filed a $30 million breach of contract suit in California Superior Court after receiving a notice from Henley saying that he was terminating his contract even though he reportedly owed the company two more studio albums and a greatest-hits collection. Henley wanted to sign a publishing deal with EMI Records that would have been worth a few million dollars. Geffen Records stopped this from happening, which in turn upset Henley.

Geffen Records claimed that Henley was in breach of contract and Henley attempted to get out of his contract in 1993 based on a 50-year-old California statute. Under the statute, enacted to free actors from long-term studio deals, entertainers cannot be forced to work for any company for more than seven years. Geffen Records did not want Henley signing with any other label, and had an agreement with Sony and EMI that they would not sign Henley. He counter-sued Geffen Records, claiming that he was "blackballed" by David Geffen, who had made agreements with other record labels to not sign him.

Henley eventually became an outspoken advocate for musicians' rights, taking a stand against record labels who he believes refuse to pay bands their due royalties. Henley came to terms with Geffen Records when the Eagles' reunion took off and the company eventually took a large chunk of the profit from their live reunion album, Hell Freezes Over (1994). Glenn Frey was also in legal entanglements with his label, MCA Records (whose parent company had also acquired Geffen). Before the Eagles reunion tour could begin, the band had to file a suit against Elektra Records, which had planned to release a new Eagles Greatest Hits album. The band won that battle.

Henley and alternative rock singer Courtney Love testified at a California State Senate hearing on that state's contractual laws in Sacramento on September 5, 2001. In 2002 Henley became the head of the Recording Artists' Coalition. The coalition's primary aim was to raise money to mount a legal and political battle against the major record labels. Henley said the group sought to change the fundamental rules that govern most recording contracts, including copyright ownership, long-term control of intellectual property and unfair accounting practices. This group filed a friend-of-the-court brief in the Napster case, urging District Judge Marilyn Hall Patel not to accept the industry's broad claims of works made for hire authorship.

=== Later solo work and Inside Job ===
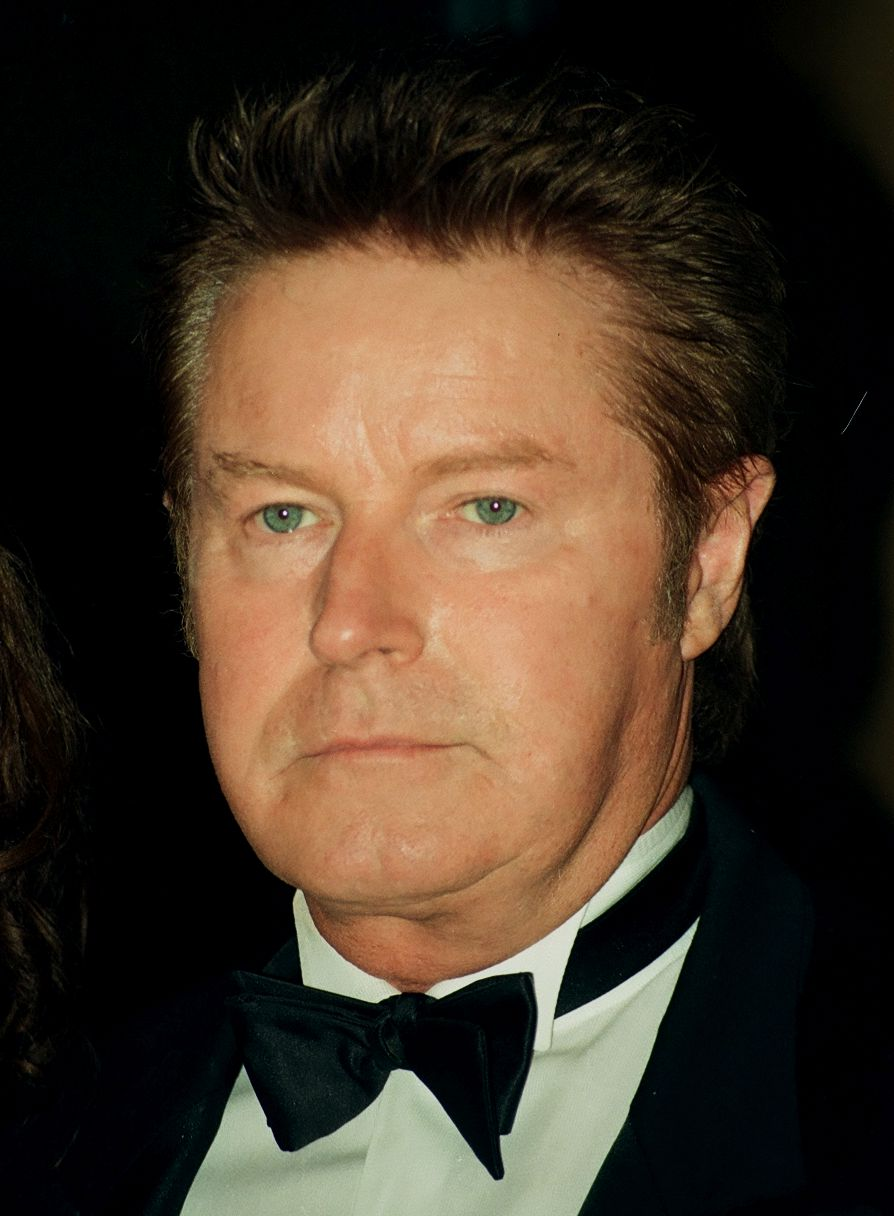
Henley in 2000

A long period without a new recording followed as Henley waited out the dispute with his record company while also participating in a 1994 Eagles reunion tour and live album. During the hiatus, Henley recorded a cover version of "Sit Down, You're Rockin' the Boat" for the comedy drama film Leap of Faith, and provided the backing vocals for country singer Trisha Yearwood's hit single "Walkaway Joe", and duetted with Patty Smyth on "Sometimes Love Just Ain't Enough", and Pink Floyd's Roger Waters on "Watching TV" on Waters' third studio album Amused to Death in 1992. Henley provided the voice of Henry Faust in Randy Newman's Faust, a 1993 musical which was released on compact disc (CD) that year.

In 2000, after 11 years, Henley released his fourth solo studio album Inside Job which peaked at number 7 on the Billboard 200 and contained the new singles "Taking You Home", "Everything Is Different Now", "Workin' It" and "For My Wedding". He performed songs from the album in a VH1 Storytellers episode during 2000. In 2002 a live DVD entitled Don Henley: Live Inside Job was released. In 2005, Henley opened 10 of Stevie Nicks' concerts on her Two Voices Tour.

Henley performed a duet with Kenny Rogers on Rogers' twenty-sixth studio album Water & Bridges (2006), titled "Calling Me" and on Reba McEntire's twenty-sixth studio album, Reba: Duets (2007), performing "Break Each Other's Hearts Again".

In a 2007 interview with CNN, while discussing the future of the Eagles, Henley indicated he still has plans for more records: "But we all have some solo plans still. I still have a contract with a major label [Warner] for a couple of solo albums." In January 2011, Henley commenced work on a solo studio album of country covers featuring special guests. Ronnie Dunn of Brooks & Dunn and Alison Krauss recorded a song with Henley for the album.

On July 18, 2015, Henley began pre-orders of his fifth solo studio album, Cass County. The album was released on September 25.

== Political activity ==
In 1990, Henley founded the Walden Woods Project to help protect "Walden Woods" from development. The Thoreau Institute at Walden Woods was started in 1998 to provide for research and education regarding Henry David Thoreau. In 1993, a tribute album titled Common Thread: The Songs of the Eagles was released, with a portion of the royalties from the sales going to the Walden Woods Project. In 2005, he had a fundraiser concert with English musician Elton John and others to buy Brister's Hill, part of Walden Woods, and turn it into a hiking trail. Henley and Ken Burns executive produced a three-part documentary on Thoreau in 2026.

Henley co-founded the non-profit Caddo Lake Institute (CLI) in 1993 with Dwight K. Shellman to underwrite ecological education and research. As part of the Caddo Lake Coalition, CLI helps protect the Texas wetland where Henley spent much of his childhood. As a result of the Caddo Lake Institute's success in restoring and protecting Caddo Lake's wetlands, Caddo Lake was included as the 13th site in the United States on the Ramsar Convention's list of significant wetlands. The Ramsar Convention is an intergovernmental treaty that provides a framework for national action and international cooperation for the conservation and wise use of wetlands and their resources.

In 2000, Henley co-founded the Recording Artists' Coalition, a group founded to protect musicians' rights against common music industry business practices. In this role he testified before the United States Senate Committee on the Judiciary in 2001 and the United States Senate Committee on Commerce, Science, and Transportation in 2003.

Henley in a 2008 interview revealed that he contributes to many other charitable causes such as The Race to Erase MS, and the Rhythm and Blues Foundation. He is also a member of the Curiosity Stream Advisory Board.

A lifelong supporter of the Democratic Party, Henley has also been a generous donor to political campaigns of Democrats. In 2008, The Washington Post reported Henley had donated over $680,000 to political candidates since 1978. Several tracks on the 2007 Eagles' studio album Long Road Out of Eden (including the title track, which Henley co-wrote) are sharply critical of the Iraq War and other policies of the George W. Bush administration.

Henley's liberal political leanings led to tension with guitarist Bernie Leadon when Leadon submitted the song "I Wish You Peace" for inclusion on the Eagles' fourth studio album One of These Nights (1975). Henley was not thrilled that the song was co-written by Patti Davis, who was the daughter of Ronald Reagan, the Republican Party governor of California at that time.

Henley endorsed Joe Biden in the 2020 presidential election.

In a fundraiser hosted by actor Matthew McConaughey to raise money for Texans affected by the snowstorms in February 2021, Henley performed "Snow", which was written by Jesse Winchester. The show premiered on March 21, 2021. Henley remarked "On that bitter cold Tuesday of February 16th, we had a busted pipe at the attic at my house, and me and my family were shoveling and bailing for 8 or 9 hours there. Nothing, of course, compared to the shoveling and bailing that's been going on down in the state capitol the past three weeks."

In a Discover Concord magazine interview in the summer of 2021, Henley spoke of the Walden Woods Foundation as well as his life during the COVID-19 pandemic. Henley noted that "I think that each and every one of us has a duty to help care for our natural environment, even if it's something as simple as not throwing your fast-food wrapper out the car window."

In 2026, it was reported that Henley was one of the largest donors to Track AIPAC. In 2026, Henley spent around $2.3 million in support of Democratic candidates, including the campaigns of James Talarico, Bobby Pulido, Vikki Goodwin, and Clayton Tucker.

=== Digital Millennium Copyright Act ===
On June 2, 2020, Henley gave testimony to the United States Congress regarding his views on copyright law, specifically the Digital Millennium Copyright Act (DMCA). Henley argued that the act is outdated, unfair to artists, and that it is not sufficiently enforced. These statements in turn sparked public backlash against him from parties believing that DMCA enforcement is already too harshly enforced and often abused. Opposition to Henley's views was particularly widespread among online content creators, many of whom had been subject to YouTube copyright strikes pertaining to the use of songs by Henley or the Eagles, regardless of the legitimacy of the claim in question.

Henley is known for taking down online content involving music for which he holds copyright, doing so even when the content in question is considered fair use. According to research conducted by YouTuber, multi-instrumentalist, music producer and educator Rick Beato, Henley has been responsible for manual takedowns of instructional videos teaching others how to play the Eagles' songs despite such educational material falling under fair use protections.

== Personal life ==
In 1974, Henley became involved with Lorelei Shellist, and the break-up of their relationship was the inspiration for the song "Wasted Time" and parts of the lyrics for "Hotel California". Late in 1976, Henley started dating Fleetwood Mac singer Stevie Nicks as her relationship with bandmate Lindsey Buckingham came to an end. The relationship lasted on and off for around two years, and Henley claimed that Nicks wrote her song "Sara" about their unborn child. Nicks ultimately made a decision to have an abortion. Henley then began a three-year-long relationship with the fashion model, actress, and Bond Girl Lois Chiles.

In the early 1980s, Henley was engaged to Battlestar Galactica actress and model Maren Jensen. His debut solo studio album I Can't Stand Still (1982) was dedicated to Jensen, who also sang harmony vocals on the song "Johnny Can't Read". He and Jensen separated in 1986.

In 1995, Henley married model and socialite Sharon Summerall. Performers at the wedding included Bruce Springsteen, the Police's Sting, Billy Joel, John Fogerty, Jackson Browne, Sheryl Crow, Glenn Frey and Tony Bennett. Henley later wrote the song "Everything Is Different Now" on his fourth solo studio album Inside Job (2000) for Summerall. Summerall has been diagnosed with multiple sclerosis (MS). They have three children together: two daughters and a son.

In 2012, Henley was estimated to be the fourth-wealthiest drummer in the world (behind the Beatles' Ringo Starr, Genesis's Phil Collins and the Foo Fighters' Dave Grohl), with a combined fortune of $200 million.

In February 2024, it was revealed that Henley had stalled plans for an Eagles biography that writer Ed Sanders planned to publish. Friction between the two of them was the stated reason.

=== Legal issues ===
Henley called paramedics to his home on November 21, 1980, and there they found a naked 16-year-old girl claiming she had overdosed on Quaaludes and cocaine. She was arrested for prostitution, while a 15-year-old girl found in the house was arrested for being under the influence of drugs. Henley was also arrested and subsequently charged with contributing to the delinquency of a minor. He pleaded no contest, and was fined $2,500 and put on two years' probation. Lois Chiles, who was no longer in a relationship with Henley at the time of the incident, later said, "I was shocked to hear about it. He didn't have drugs around the house. It was an accident, I'm sure". The media attention from this incident was the primary inspiration for the 1982 song "Dirty Laundry".

The incident was the second time Henley had been found with an underage prostitute. A while later, officers from the Los Angeles Police Department's Sexually Exploited Child Unit arrived and placed Henley and the girl under arrest. During the trial testimony, Henley described the incident leading to his arrest as "a poor decision which I regret to this day", stating that he sought an "escape" due to the depression he developed after the Eagles' recent break-up.

In February 2024, ahead of another criminal trial in New York over the alleged theft of Henley's original handwritten lyrics for many of the Eagles' hits, Judge Curtis Farber sided with attorneys for the two young female defendants arrested for prostitution and drug use. The attorneys had sought to introduce a letter Henley wrote to a Santa Monica probation officer giving his account of the events leading up to Henley's arrest. Contrary to Henley's 1991 claim that he was hosting a farewell party for the Eagles' road crew, the letter stated that Henley actually "didn't want to see any of my friends". Instead he placed a call to a madam, who sent a girl over to his home. Henley said he and the girl had a few drinks and did some cocaine, and later she had what appeared to him to be an epileptic seizure. Henley called paramedics, but the girl had recovered by the time they arrived. Henley said it was only when the paramedics asked the girl questions that he learned she was underage.

== Accolades and awards ==
Henley has won two Grammy Awards and a further award associated with the Grammys, MusiCares Person of the Year. He has also won a number of other awards, such as MTV Video Music Awards for "The Boys of Summer" in 1985, and "The End of the Innocence" in 1990.

In 2008, Henley was ranked as the 87th-greatest singer of all time by Rolling Stone.

In May 2012, Henley was awarded an honorary Doctorate of Music from Berklee College of Music along with Glenn Frey, Joe Walsh and Timothy B. Schmit.

In 2015, Henley received the Trailblazer Award from the Americana Music Honors & Awards.

=== Grammy Awards ===
Year	Nominee / work	Award	Result	Ref.
1983	"Dirty Laundry"	Rock Male Vocalist	Nominated	
1986	"The Boys of Summer"	Rock Male Vocalist	Won	
1986	"The Boys of Summer"	Record of the Year	Nominated	
1986	"The Boys of Summer"	Song of the Year	Nominated	
1986	Don Henley, Danny Kortchmar, Greg Ladanyi	Producer of the Year	Nominated	
1990	"The End of the Innocence"	Rock Male Vocalist	Won	
1990	"The End of the Innocence"	Record of the Year	Nominated	
1990	"The End of the Innocence"	Song of the Year	Nominated	
1990	The End of the Innocence	Album of the Year	Nominated	
1993	"Sometimes Love Just Ain't Enough", Patty Smyth and Don Henley	Pop Performance by a Duo	Nominated	
2001	"Taking You Home"	Male Pop Vocal Performance	Nominated	
2001	"Workin' It"	Rock Male Vocalist	Nominated	
2001	Inside Job	Pop Vocal Album	Nominated	
2002	"Inside Out", Trisha Yearwood and Don Henley	Country Collaboration with Vocals	Nominated	
2003	"It's So Easy", Sheryl Crow and Don Henley	Pop Collaboration with Vocals	Nominated	
2007	Don Henley	MusiCares Person of the Year	Won	
2007	"Calling Me", Kenny Rogers and Don Henley	Country Collaboration with Vocals	Nominated	
2016	"The Cost of Living", Stan Lynch and Don Henley	American Roots Song	Nominated	

== Discography ==
Studio albums

- I Can't Stand Still (1982)
- Building the Perfect Beast (1984)
- The End of the Innocence (1989)
- Inside Job (2000)
- Cass County (2015)
