= All She Wants to Do Is Dance =

Single by Don Henley

from the album Building the Perfect Beast
- B-side: "Building the Perfect Beast"
- Released: February 1985
- Recorded: 1984
- Genre: Hard rock; pop rock; dance-rock
- Length: 4:28 (album); 4:23 (remix edit)
- Label: Geffen
- Songwriter: Danny Kortchmar
- Producers: Don Henley; Danny Kortchmar; Greg Ladanyi

Don Henley singles chronology
"The Boys of Summer" (1984)	"All She Wants to Do Is Dance" (1985)	"Not Enough Love in the World" (1985)

Music video
- "All She Wants to Do Is Dance" on YouTube

"All She Wants to Do Is Dance" is a song written by Danny Kortchmar and performed by Don Henley, co-lead vocalist and drummer for Eagles. It was released as the second single from Henley's second studio solo album, Building the Perfect Beast (1984), and was Henley's sixth solo single overall. It was one of Henley's most commercially successful singles, peaking at No. 9 on Billboard Hot 100 and also became his third song to top the Top Rock Tracks chart.

== History ==
The song critiques the US intervention in Central America, particularly in the then-ongoing Contra War, in which the Reagan administration funded the right-wing rebel group Contras to overthrow the socialist Sandinista National Liberation Front government in Nicaragua.

Backing vocals for the song were provided by Patty Smyth of the band Scandal, and Martha Davis, lead singer of the Motels.

When Kortchmar was asked about the song, he said, "I had the groove and the music going. That record was made back when the technology had just started to really take over in music. I had one of the first Yamaha DX7s, which was a keyboard that was used a ton in the '80s, but we ended up luckily getting one of the first ones in the United States. It's a synthesizer keyboard, and I used it to get that sound that you hear the record starting with."

The commercial U.S. 7" vinyl version has a slightly different intro from the LP version from Building the Perfect Beast.

== Critical reception ==
John Leland from Spin magazine wrote "...this mother whomps from the git with punchy electronic drums and a mix that keeps one foot off the ground for a full seven-and-a-half minutes. Henley's post-hedonist vision of apocalypse is twisted." Robert Christgau called it "the simplest and most effective [song] on the record." Rolling Stone called it "a caustic, dry-witted look at Americans abroad, partying obliviously in dangerous places. It's Henley's own 'Undercover of the Night,' full of images of violence and heat: Club Med à go-go in the bloody Third World. And it rocks with words and music as pointed as punji sticks".

== Personnel ==
- Don Henley – lead and harmony vocals, drums
- David Paich – synthesizers
- Steve Porcaro – programming
- Danny Kortchmar – guitars
- Martha Davis – harmony vocals
- Patty Smyth – harmony vocals

== Chart performance ==
Chart (1985)	Peak position
Australian (Kent Music Report)	22
Canadian RPM Top Singles	13
U.S. Billboard Hot 100	9
U.S. Billboard Hot Dance Club Play	10
U.S. Billboard Top Rock Tracks	1
U.S. Billboard Hot R&B Singles	65

Year-end chart (1985)	Rank
US Top Pop Singles (Billboard)	97

== Other versions ==
The single "All She Wanna Do Is Dance" by David Guetta and Niles Mason uses samples of this song.

== See also ==
- List of number-one mainstream rock hits (United States)
- Ronald Reagan in music
