= Sunset Grill (song) =

1985 song by Don Henley

Single by Don Henley

from the album Building the Perfect Beast
- B-side: "Man with a Mission"
- Released: August 1985
- Recorded: 1983–1984
- Genre: Rock; electronic rock; pop rock
- Length: 6:29 (album version); 4:26 (radio edit)
- Label: Geffen
- Songwriter(s): Don Henley; Danny Kortchmar; Benmont Tench
- Producer(s): Don Henley; Danny Kortchmar; Greg Ladanyi

Don Henley singles chronology
"Not Enough Love in the World" (1985)	"Sunset Grill" (1985)	"The End of the Innocence" (1989)

Official audio
- "Sunset Grill" on YouTube

"Sunset Grill" is a song by American rock musician Don Henley from his second solo studio album Building the Perfect Beast (1984). The song peaked at number 7 on the Billboard Top Rock Tracks chart in January 1985. Released as the fourth single from the album in August 1985, it peaked at number 22 on the Billboard Hot 100 in October 1985.

== History ==
Patty Smyth of rock band Scandal sings harmony vocals on this song, while Welsh musician Pino Palladino plays fretless bass. Randy Newman and others arranged the synthesizers for the song.

The title and lyrics of the song reference the Sunset Grill, a hamburger restaurant on Sunset Boulevard in Los Angeles, California.

== Critical reception ==
Billboard said that the "deliberate rock beat and dense synths build an effective mood of aimless discontent." Cashbox said that "this melancholy and dynamic track is orchestrated beautifully and Henley's vocals are right on."

== Personnel ==
- Don Henley – lead vocals
- Michael Boddicker – synthesizers, E-mu Emulator
- Benmont Tench – synthesizers
- David Paich – acoustic piano solo
- Danny Kortchmar – guitars, guitar synthesizer solo, horns solo
- Pino Palladino – fretless bass
- Patty Smyth – harmony vocals
- Synthesizer arrangements by Michael Boddicker, Don Henley, Danny Kortchmar, Benmont Tench and Randy Newman.
- Horns arrangements by Jerry Hey

== Chart performance ==
Chart (1985)	Peak position
Australian (Kent Music Report)	98
Canada RPM Top Singles	52
Canada RPM Adult Contemporary	3
U.S. Billboard Hot 100	22
U.S. Billboard Adult Contemporary	18
U.S. Billboard Top Rock Tracks	7
U.S. Cash Box Top 100	20
