= Danny Kortchmar =

American musician (born 1946)

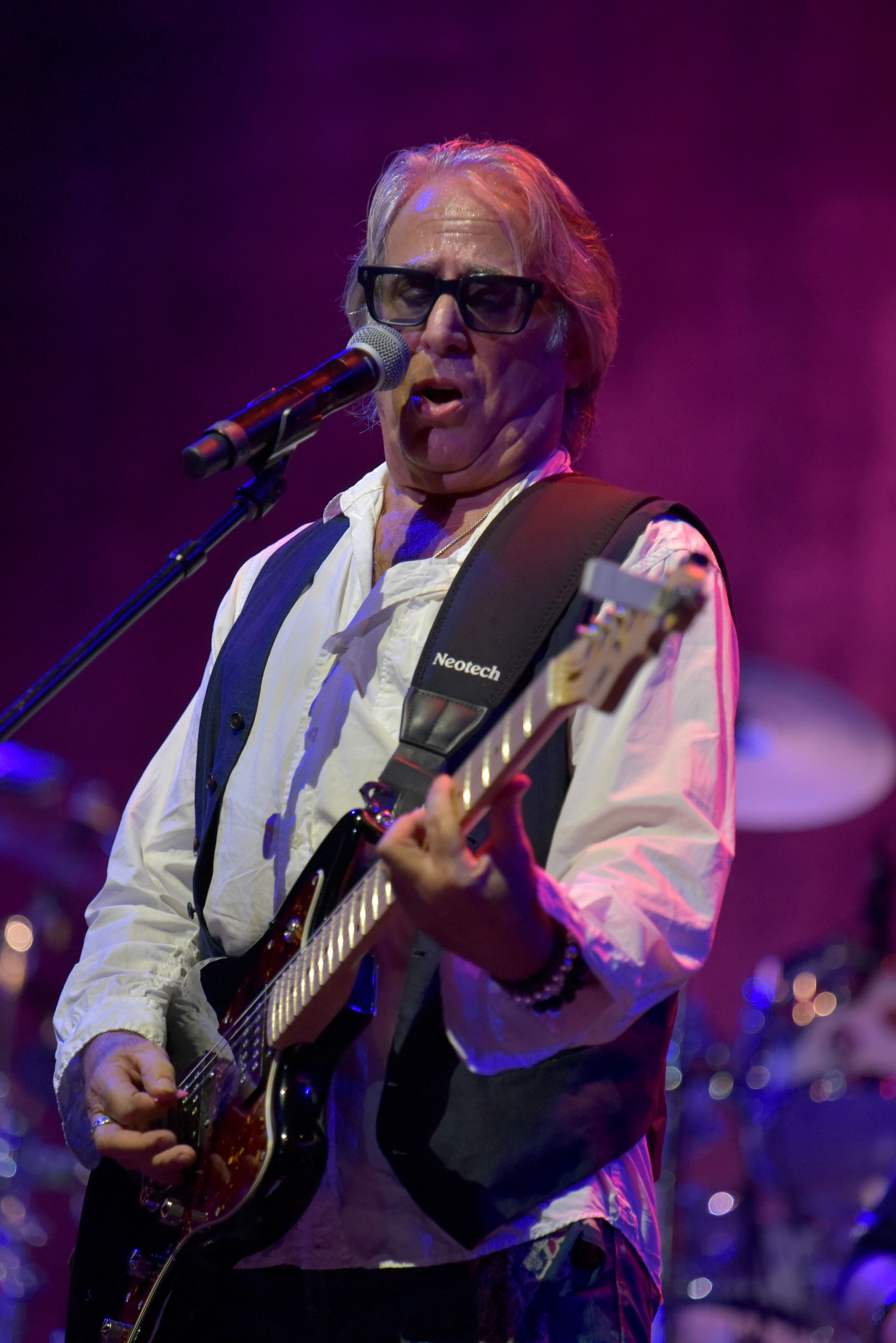
- Kortchmar in 2019

Background information
- Also known as: Danny Kootch
- Born: April 6, 1946 (age 80); New York City, U.S.
- Genres: Rock; pop; blues; rhythm and blues
- Occupations: Musician; songwriter; producer
- Instruments: Guitar; vocals
- Years active: 1960s–present

Daniel Kortchmar (born April 6, 1946), also known as Danny Kootch, is an American guitarist, session musician, producer and songwriter. His work with singer-songwriters such as Don Henley, Linda Ronstadt, James Taylor, David Crosby, Carole King, David Cassidy, Graham Nash, Neil Young, Steve Perry, and Carly Simon helped define the signature sound of the singer-songwriter era of the 1970s. Jackson Browne and Don Henley have recorded many songs written or co-written by Kortchmar, and Kortchmar was Henley's songwriting and producing partner in the 1980s.

== Early life ==
Kortchmar was born on 6 April 1946 in New York City, United States. He is the son of manufacturer Emil Kortchmar and author Lucy Cores.

Kortchmar first came to prominence in the mid-1960s playing with bands in New York City, such as the King Bees and The Flying Machine, which included a then-unknown James Taylor (Kortchmar and Taylor met when both families spent summers on Martha's Vineyard while both men were in their teens). In Taylor's autobiographical composition "Fire and Rain", the line "sweet dreams and flying machines in pieces on the ground" is a reference to the breakup of that band. During 1966, Kortchmar traveled to England, where he spent time as a session musician.

== Career ==
In 1967, he joined The Fugs, appearing on their 1968 Tenderness Junction album before following bassist Charles Larkey to California, where they joined Carole King in forming a trio named The City. The group produced an album in 1968, Now That Everything's Been Said, which received scattered good reviews but was not a commercial success. The group subsequently broke up but Kortchmar continued backing King on her more successful solo career, including the groundbreaking 1971 album Tapestry. In 1970, Kortchmar reunited with Taylor on his breakthrough album Sweet Baby James. Kortchmar's work with Taylor and King made him one of the top LA session guitarists in the 1970s and 1980s.

Kortchmar worked on his own, reuniting with Larkey in the band Jo Mama in 1970 and 1971 and recording solo albums Kootch (1973) and Innuendo (1980), but he experienced his greatest success backing other artists such as Linda Ronstadt, Warren Zevon, Harry Nilsson and Jackson Browne. (When Browne recorded Kortchmar's song "Shaky Town" for the Running on Empty album, Kortchmar sang harmony vocals.) In the 1970s, he made three albums with Leland Sklar, Russ Kunkel, and Craig Doerge, as The Section.

He recorded two albums as part of the band Attitudes, with Jim Keltner, David Foster and Paul Stallworth, for George Harrison's Dark Horse record label. The self-titled album Attitudes included Kortchmar's "Honey Don't Leave L.A.", which James Taylor also recorded. The second album, Good News, included several Kortchmar compositions.

He wrote music for the Cheech & Chong film Up in Smoke and he also produced recordings by Don Henley, Neil Young, Jon Bon Jovi, Stevie Nicks, Billy Joel, Hanson, Tracy Chapman, Louise Goffin and others. Kortchmar is featured on guitar on Carole King's 1975 album, Thoroughbred.

In the early 1980s, Kortchmar toured and recorded extensively with Linda Ronstadt and appeared in two of her music videos. He can be seen playing guitar in the video for "Get Closer". In 1983, he played Linda's love interest in the music video for "What's New?" He also appeared with Linda when she performed on the twenty-fifth anniversary Grammy Awards telecast.

Kortchmar had a cameo in the 1984 mockumentary This Is Spinal Tap. He played Ronnie Pudding, the band's bass player in their early years, in the "Gimme Some Money" video segment.

In 1984, he co-produced and played on Don Henley's album Building the Perfect Beast. On that album, Kortchmar wrote the songs "You're Not Drinking Enough" and "All She Wants to Do Is Dance". Also on that album, he co-wrote the songs "You Can't Make Love", "Man with a Mission", "Not Enough Love in the World", "Building the Perfect Beast", "Sunset Grill", and "Drivin' with Your Eyes Closed".

In 1989, Kortchmar co-produced and played on Don Henley's album The End of the Innocence. Also on that album, he co-wrote the songs "How Bad Do You Want It?", "I Will Not Go Quietly", "New York Minute", "Shangri-La", "Little Tin God", and "If Dirt Were Dollars".

In 1990, Kortchmar co-produced and played on Jon Bon Jovi's #1 album Blaze of Glory.

In 1991, Kortchmar co-wrote the song "Love In The 21st Century", with Glenn Frey and Jack Tempchin for Frey's album Strange Weather.

In 1992, he co-produced Toto's eighth studio album, Kingdom of Desire. He also wrote two of the songs on the album: "Kick Down the Walls" and the title track.

In 1993, he co-produced and played on Billy Joel's album River of Dreams.

In 1995, Kortchmar produced and played rhythm guitar on several tracks of The Fabulous Thunderbirds album Roll of the Dice.

In 1996, Kortchmar formed the group Slō Leak, playing primarily blues rock, and released an eponymous album.

In 1999, the group released its second album, When the Clock Strikes 12.

Kortchmar was brought aboard to produce Van Halen's abandoned second album with former Extreme singer Gary Cherone in 1999.

In 2004, Kortchmar started a new group, the Midnight Eleven, and the band released its first album in 2005.

In 2006 he co-produced Hanson's album The Walk, which was released in the US in the summer of 2007.

Also in 2006, Kortchmar participated in the Japanese tour of the Verbs, a unit consisting of Steve Jordan and Jordan's wife, Meegan Voss.

In 2010, Kortchmar joined the Troubadour Reunion Tour supporting James Taylor and Carole King along with Section bandmates Lee Sklar and Russ Kunkel. In the souvenir book for the tour, his biography stated that he was working on an album of his songs that were originally recorded by other artists. He appears in the 2022 documentary Carole King and James Taylor: Just Call Out My Name.

== Discography ==
=== Solo ===
- 1973 Kootch (Warner Bros.)
- 1980 Innuendo (Asylum)

=== With associated groups ===
- 1965 That Ain't Love / What She Does To Me (single) King Bees (RCA)
- 1966 Rhythm And Blues / On Your Way Down To Drain (single) King Bees (RCA)
- 1966 Lost In The Shuffle / Hardly - Part III (single) King Bees (RCA)
- 1968 Tenderness Junction / The Fugs (Reprise)
- 1968 It Crawled into My Hand Honest /The Fugs (Reprise)
- 1969 Now That Everything's Been Said / The City (Ode)
- 1970 Jo Mama / Jo Mama (Atlantic)
- 1970: Writer / Carole King (Ode /A&M)
- 1970 Sweet Baby James / James Taylor (Warner Bros.)
- 1971 Tapestry / Carole King (Ode /A&M)
- 1971 Music / Carole King (Ode /A&M)
- 1971 J Is for Jump / Jo Mama (Atlantic)
- 1971 Sister Kate / Kate Taylor (Cotillion)
- 1971 James Taylor and the Original Flying Machine / James Taylor and the Original Flying Machine (re-released 1996)
- 1971 Mud Slide Slim and the Blue Horizon / James Taylor (Warner Bros.)
- 1972 One Man Dog / James Taylor (Warner Bros)
- 1972: Rhymes & Reasons / Carole King (Ode /A&M)
- 1972 Graham Nash David Crosby / Crosby & Nash (Atlantic)
- 1972 The Section / The Section(Warner Bros)
- 1973 Forward Motion /The Section (Warner Bros)
- 1974 Wrap Around Joy / Carole King (Ode /A&M)
- 1975 Attitudes / Attitudes (Dark Horse)
- 1975 "Wind on the Water/ David Crosby and Graham Nash (ABC)
- 1975 Gorilla / James Taylor (Warner Bros.)
- 1976 In The Pocket / James Taylor (Warner Bros.)
- 1976 Whistling Down the Wire / Crosby & Nash (ABC)
- 1977 Running on Empty / Jackson Browne (Asylum)
- 1977 JT / James Taylor (Columbia)
- 1977 Good News / Attitudes (Dark Horse)
- 1977 Fork it Over / The Section (Capitol)
- 1977 Crosby–Nash Live / Crosby & Nash (ABC)
- 1978 Excitable Boy / Warren Zevon Ayslum
- 1979 Flag / James Taylor (Columbia)
- 1980 Mad Love / Linda Ronstadt (Asylum)
- 1980 Hold Out / Jackson Browne (Asylum)
- 1980 Earth & Sky / Graham Nash (Capitol)
- 1981 Shot of Love / Bob Dylan
- 1982 One to One / Carole King (Atlantic)
- 1982 Get Closer / Linda Ronstadt (Asylum)
- 1982 Daylight Again / Crosby, Stills & Nash (Atlantic)
- 1982 I Can't Stand Still / Don Henley (Asylum)
- 1983 Allies / Crosby, Stills & Nash (Atlantic)
- 1983 Speeding Time / Carole King (Atlantic)
- 1983 Lawyers In Love / Jackson Browne (Asylum)
- 1984 Building the Perfect Beast / Don Henley (Geffen)
- 1986 Lives In The Balance / Jackson Browne (Asylum)
- 1986 Landing on Water / Neil Young (Geffen)
- 1989 The End of the Innocence / Don Henley (Geffen)
- 1990 Blaze of Glory / Jon Bon Jovi Guitar/Producer (Vertigo)
- 1990 Brent Bourgeois / Brent Bourgeois (Charisma Records)
- 1991 New Moon Shine / James Taylor (Columbia)
- 1993 (US) Kingdom of Desire / Toto Writer /Producer Relativity
- 1993 River of Dreams / Billy Joel (Columbia)
- 1995 The Fabulous Thunderbirds / Roll Of The Dice (Private Inc)
- 1996 I'll Sleep When I'm Dead / Warren Zevon (Rhino)
- 1997 The Fabul / Don Henley (Warner Bros)
- 2001 Boz Scaggs / Dig
- 2005 Midnight Eleven / Midnight Eleven
- 2010 Live at the Troubadour / Carole King and James Taylor (Hear Music/Concord)
- 2018 Honey Don't Leave LA / Danny Kortchmar and The Immediate Family (Vivid Sound)
- 2018 Live In Japan at Billboard Live Tokyo June 18, 2018 / Danny Kortchmar and The Immediate Family (Vivid Sound)
- 2019 Live In Hollywood (1980) / Linda Ronstadt HBO TV Special / (Rhino)
- 2020 Turn It Up To 10 / The Immediate Family (Vivid Sound)
- 2020 Slippin & Slidin EP / The Immediate Family (Quarto Valley Records)
- 2021 Why Wait! / Kate Taylor
- 2021 Can't Stop Progress EP / The Immediate Family (Quarto Valley Records)
- 2021 The Immediate Family / The Immediate Family (Quarto Valley Records)
- 2024 The Immediate Family / Skin in the Game (Quarto Valley Records)
