= Hearts in Trouble =

Single by Chicago

from the album Days of Thunder
- B-side: "Car Building" by Hans Zimmer
- Released: July 1990
- Genre: Hard rock; blues rock
- Length: 5:14 (album version); 4:00 (radio edit version)
- Label: DGC
- Songwriters: Bill Champlin; Dennis Matkosky; Kevin Dukes
- Producers: Bill Champlin; Dennis Matkosky

Chicago singles chronology
"What Kind of Man Would I Be?" (1989)	"Hearts in Trouble" (1990)	"Chasin' the Wind" (1991)

Professional ratings
Review scores
Source	Rating
AllMusic	2/5 stars

"Hearts in Trouble" is a song by American rock band Chicago. It was released as the second single from the soundtrack of the Tom Cruise film Days of Thunder, released in July 1990 and distributed by DGC Records in US releases and Epic Records on international releases. "Hearts in Trouble" was written and produced by Bill Champlin, Dennis Matkosky and Kevin Dukes, while Champlin sings lead.

"Hearts in Trouble" was among the ten most added songs to radio stations reporting to Billboard for the week dated July 21, 1990. The song peaked at number 75 on the Billboard Hot 100. In the summer of 1990, Chicago launched the Hearts in Trouble Tour.

== Reception ==
Retrospective commentary has been limited. In 2012, Dave Steed of PopDose described the track as emblematic of Chicago's transitional period in the early 1990s, noting it as one of several lesser-known singles tied to film projects.

== Music video ==
The music video for "Hearts in Trouble" was directed by Michael Bay and produced by Howard Woffinden through Propaganda Films.

== Track listing ==
7-inch single, EU (1990)
No.	Title	Length
1.	"Hearts in Trouble"	5:14
2.	"Car Building" (by Hans Zimmer)	2:36

12-inch, CD and maxi-single, EU (1990)
No.	Title	Length
1.	"Hearts in Trouble"	5:14
2.	"Car Building" (by Hans Zimmer)	2:26
3.	"Thunder Box" (by Apollo Smile)	3:46

CD and promo, US (1990)
No.	Title	Length
1.	"Hearts in Trouble" (radio edit)	4:00
2.	"Hearts in Trouble" (album version)	5:14

== Charts ==
Chart (1990)	Peak position
Australia (ARIA)	77
Netherlands (Single Top 100)	54
US Billboard Hot 100	75
US Cashbox	57
