= When You Were Mine =

When You Were Mine may refer to:

- "When You Were Mine" (Prince song) (1980), covered by Cyndi Lauper (1983)
- "When You Were Mine" (Taylor Henderson song) (2014)
- "When You Were Mine" (The Church song) (1982), a single from the album The Blurred Crusade
- "When You Were Mine" (Shenandoah song) (1991), a single from the album Extra Mile
- "When You Were Mine" (2011), a song by Lady Antebellum from the album Own the Night
- "When You Were Mine" (2014), a song by Night Terrors of 1927
- When You Were Mine (album), an album by John Waite, 1997
