= Wilborn =

Wilborn is a surname. Notable people with the surname include:

- Charles M. Wilborn, American sound engineer
- Claude Wilborn (1912–1992), baseball right fielder
- Dave Wilborn (1904–1982), American jazz singer
- Frithjof Wilborn (born 1961), Norwegian footballer and television presenter
- Marshall Wilborn (born 1952), American bass player and composer
- Rick Wilborn, politician
- Ted Wilborn (born 1958), Major League Baseball outfielder
