= Days of Thunder (soundtrack) =

Film soundtrack

Soundtrack album by Various Artists
- Released: June 26, 1990
- Genres: AOR; pop rock; adult contemporary
- Length: 51:58
- Labels: DGC (US); CBS/Sony (Japan); Epic (International)
- Producer: various artists

Singles from Days of Thunder (soundtrack)
- 1. "Show Me Heaven" Released: June 1990; 2. "Hearts in Trouble" Released: July 1990; 3. "The Last Note of Freedom" Released: September 24, 1990; 4. "You Gotta Love Someone" Released: October 8, 1990

Professional ratings
Review scores
Source	Rating
AllMusic	1.5/5 stars
Filmtracks	3/5 stars
Select	4/5 medals

Days of Thunder is the soundtrack from the film of the same name, released in 1990 in the United States by DGC Records, in Japan by CBS/Sony and internationally by Epic Records.

== Background ==
"The Last Note of Freedom" was co-written by Hans Zimmer, Billy Idol and David Coverdale.

Maria McKee's "Show Me Heaven" was released as a single alongside the movie and reached number one in the music charts of the UK, Belgium, the Netherlands and Norway.

The album is also notable for the inclusion of Guns N' Roses' cover of Bob Dylan's "Knockin' on Heaven's Door", a year before the song was released with a slightly different mix on the 1991 album Use Your Illusion II. The version recorded for the soundtrack features these spoken word responses in the second verse, which are omitted from the later album recording:

Mama put my guns in the ground (It wasn't their fault)
I can't shoot them anymore (How were they even supposed to know?)
That cold black cloud is coming down (All things can be healed in time)
Feels like I'm knockin' on Heaven's door (Why, why do which you're doing?)

The Cher song "Trail of Broken Hearts" was released as a B-side on the single "Love and Understanding" and belongs to the recording sessions of her 1989 album Heart of Stone.

The song "Gimme Some Lovin'" is credited to Terry Reid, but the version in the movie is actually from The Spencer Davis Group. "Gimme Some Lovin'" also features on Reid's 1991 solo album, The Driver, along with an alternate version of "The Last Note of Freedom" with different lyrics, titled "The Driver (Part 2)".

== Track listing ==
Side one
No.	Title	Lyrics	Music	Producer(s)	Length
1.	"The Last Note of Freedom" (performed by David Coverdale)	Billy Idol	Hans Zimmer	Trevor Horn	5:44
2.	"Deal for Life" (performed by John Waite)	Bernie Taupin; Martin Page		Martin Paige; Ron Nevison	4:36
3.	"Break Through the Barrier" (performed by Tina Turner)	André Cymone; Gardner Cole		André Cymone	4:47
4.	"Hearts in Trouble" (performed by Chicago)	Bill Champlin; Dennis Matkosky; Kevin Dukes		Bill Champlin; Dennis Matkosky	5:14
5.	"Trail of Broken Hearts" (performed by Cher)	Bruce Foster; Richie Sambora; Thomas J. Marolda		Richie Sambora	4:32
Total length:					24:53

Side two
No.	Title	Lyrics	Producer(s)	Length
1.	"Knockin' on Heaven's Door" (performed by Guns N' Roses)	Bob Dylan	Mike Clink	5:36
2.	"You Gotta Love Someone" (performed by Elton John)	Bernie Taupin; Elton John	Don Was	4:59
3.	"Show Me Heaven" (performed by Maria McKee)	Maria McKee; Eric Rackin; Jay Rifkin	Peter Asher	3:48
4.	"Thunderbox" (performed by Apollo Smile)	Apollo Smile; Freddie "Groove Commander" Richmond	Apollo Smile; Freddie "Groove Commander" Richmond	3:48
5.	"Long Live the Night" (performed by Joan Jett and the Blackhearts)	Joan Jett; Michael Caruso; Randy Cantor	Kenny Laguna; Thom Panunzio (co-producer)	3:57
6.	"Gimme Some Lovin'" (performed by Terry Reid)	Muff Winwood; Spencer Davis; Steve Winwood	Trevor Horn	5:01
Total length:				27:09

== Charts ==
Chart (1990)	Peak position
Australian Albums (ARIA)	31
Austrian Albums (Ö3 Austria)	16
Canada Top Albums/CDs (RPM)	10
Dutch Albums (Album Top 100)	41
Finnish Albums (Suomen virallinen lista)	17
German Albums (Offizielle Top 100)	29
New Zealand Albums (RMNZ)	32
Norwegian Albums (VG-lista)	2
Swedish Albums (Sverigetopplistan)	14
Swiss Albums (Schweizer Hitparade)	11
UK Compilation Albums (OCC)	4
US Billboard 200	27

== Certifications ==
Region	Certification	Certified units/sales
Canada (Music Canada)	Platinum	100,000^{^}
Switzerland (IFPI Switzerland)	Gold	25,000^{^}
United Kingdom (BPI)	Gold	100,000^{^}
United States (RIAA)	Gold	500,000^{^}
^{^} Shipments figures based on certification alone.

== Days of Thunder (score) ==
Days of Thunder

Film score by Hans Zimmer
- Released: November 5, 2013
- Recorded: 1989–1990
- Studios: Media Ventures (Santa Monica, California); Record Plant; Lion Share Studios (Los Angeles, California)
- Genres: Score; instrumental pop; melodic rock; pop rock; hard rock
- Length: 71:14
- Label: La-La Land Records
- Producers: Hans Zimmer; Paul Staveley O'Duffy

The film score to Days of Thunder was composed and arranged by Hans Zimmer and features Jeff Beck on guitar. While bootlegs were available for years, an official album containing the score was not released until 2013, when La-La Land Records released the film's score, with bonus tracks, for the first time.

While looking back at the film's production, Zimmer said, "It was complete insanity, but again because it was [director Tony Scott] he'd just keep it recklessly fun." Zimmer elaborated on this by explaining how the film's production was behind schedule and what originally was a day trip to meet with producers in Daytona turned into a three-month composing gig done inside a studio built within a warehouse.

=== Track listing ===
1. "Days of Thunder (Main Title)" (3:08)
2. "Rowdy Drives/Who Is This Driver?" (02:06)
3. "Let Me Drive/Cole Drives Rowdy's Car" (02:26)
4. "Car Building" (02:05)
5. "Darlington – Cole Wins" (04:47)
6. "You're Home/Daytona Race/The Crash" (03:29)
7. "The Hospital" (02:20)
8. "Wheelchair Race" (00:37)
9. "Rental Car Race" (03:50)
10. "Claire Arrives at her Apartment" (01:55)
11. "Physical Kiss" (01:05)
12. "Cole Blows His Engine" (01:10)
13. "Wheeler/Cole Smashes" (02:25)
14. "Cole at the Laundry/Cole Agrees to Drive Rowdy's Car" (02:11)
15. "Cole and Harry Fight/Harry Talks to Car" (02:52)
16. "Cole in Truck/Pre-Race" (03:52)
17. "The Last Race" (10:20)
18. "The Last Note of Freedom" (04:57) – David Coverdale
19. "The Hospital (Alternate)" (02:21)
20. "Wheelchair Race (Alternate)" (00:38)
21. "Claire Arrives at her Apartment (Alternate Ending)" (01:53)
22. "Cole Blows His Engine (Alternate) (01:12)
23. "Pre-Race (Alternate Mix)" (02:25)
24. "Days of Thunder (Main Title) (Rock Arrangement)" (04:59)

Note

- The last track, although marked as an alternate version of the main title, is in fact an instrumental version of "The Last Note of Freedom", with some studio outtakes of Jeff Beck performing parts of "Darlington – Cole Wins" and "The Last Race" at the end. The track also includes some studio chatter, presumably between Jeff Beck and editor Chris Lebenzon.

=== Personnel ===
- Hans Zimmer – keyboards, synthesizer, programming [Fairlight CMI, Akai, Yamaha], synclavier programming
- John Van Tongeren – keyboard programming, synthesizer programming, synthesized bass, bass guitar
- Kirke Godfrey – drum programming, percussion
- John Robinson – drums
- Jeff Beck – lead guitar solo
- Michael Thompson, Tim Pierce, Dean Parks – additional electric guitars
- Paulinho da Costa – percussion
- Randy Jackson – additional bass guitar
- Bruce Fowler – additional orchestrator
- Shirley Walker – additional orchestrator, conductor
- Jay Rifkin – score mixer
