= Deal for Life =

Single by John Waite

from the album Days of Thunder Soundtrack
- B-side: "Gimme Some Lovin'" (Terry Reid)
- Released: 1990
- Length: 4:34
- Label: Epic
- Songwriters: Martin Page; Bernie Taupin
- Producers: Martin Page; Ron Nevison

John Waite singles chronology
"Don't Lose Any Sleep" (1987)	"Deal for Life" (1990)	"In Dreams" (1993)

"Deal for Life" is a song by English musician John Waite, which was released in 1990 on the soundtrack to the Tom Cruise film Days of Thunder. The song was written by Martin Page and Bernie Taupin, and produced by Page and Ron Nevison.

"Deal for Life" was the sixth and final single to be issued from the soundtrack and reached No. 80 in the UK Singles Chart in December 1990. The song's release as a single was included as a 'priority release' for Epic in the spring of 1991.

In 2018, Martin Page shared his and Taupin's 1990 demo recording of the song on SoundCloud.

== Critical reception ==
On its release as a single, Jennifer Grant of the Perthshire Advertiser considered the song "absolute guff" and "anonymous American rawk".

== Track listing ==
7" and cassette single

1. "Deal for Life" – 4:06
2. Terry Reid – "Gimme Some Lovin'" – 4:50

12" and CD single

1. "Deal for Life" – 4:34
2. Terry Reid – "Gimme Some Lovin'" – 4:50
3. Chicago – "Hearts in Trouble" – 5:16

12" single (UK release)

1. "Deal for Life" – 4:34
2. Maria McKee – "Show Me Heaven" – 3:46
3. Chicago – "Hearts in Trouble" – 5:16
4. Terry Reid – "Gimme Some Lovin'" – 4:50

CD single (UK release)

1. "Deal for Life" – 4:04
2. Maria McKee – "Show Me Heaven" – 3:46
3. Chicago – "Hearts in Trouble" – 5:16
4. Terry Reid – "Gimme Some Lovin'" – 4:50

== Personnel ==
Production

- Martin Page – producer of "Deal for Life"
- Ron Nevison – producer and mixing on "Deal for Life"
- Trevor Horn – producer of "Gimme Some Lovin'"
- Bill Champlin, Dennis Matkosky – producers of "Hearts in Trouble"
- Peter Asher – producer of "Show Me Heaven"

== Charts ==
Chart (1990)	Peak position
UK Singles (Official Charts)	80
