= Rover's Return (album) =

Studio album by John Waite
- Released: 1987
- Studios: Right Track Recording, The Hit Factory and The Power Station (New York City, New York); Carnage House Studios (Stamford, Connecticut)
- Genre: Pop rock
- Length: 40:26
- Label: EMI America Records
- Producers: Frank Filipetti; John Waite; Desmond Child (track 1); Rick Nowels (tracks 6 & 7)

John Waite chronology
Mask of Smiles (1985)	Rover's Return (1987)	Temple Bar (1995)

Rover's Return is the fourth studio album from English musician John Waite, which was released by EMI in 1987.

== Background ==
Rover's Return reached No. 77 on the US Billboard 200 and remained in the charts for twelve weeks. Two singles were released from the album, "These Times Are Hard for Lovers", co-written with Desmond Child, and "Don't Lose Any Sleep", written by Diane Warren. "These Times Are Hard for Lovers" peaked at No. 53 on the Billboard Hot 100 and "Don't Lose Any Sleep" reached No. 81.

== Recording ==
The album was largely recorded and mixed at Right Track Studios in New York City, with additional recording at The Hit Factory, The Power Station and Carriage House Studios.

During the sessions for Rover's Return, Waite recorded a version of the Billy Steinberg and Tom Kelly song "I Drove All Night". but decided not to release it. The song was also recorded by Roy Orbison in 1987 but his was not released until 1992, by which time Cyndi Lauper had her hit version in 1989. In 2001, Waite's recording was released on the One Way Records release Live & Rare Tracks.

== Release ==
Rover's Return was released via EMI America on vinyl, cassette and CD. It was released in the US, Canada, UK, and Europe. On 25 June 2012, the British label BGO Records digitally remastered the album and re-issued it in the UK.

== Critical reception ==
Professional ratings
Review scores
Source	Rating
AllMusic	2/5 stars

Upon its release, Billboard called it a "solid effort in the straightforward Waite vein". In a retrospective review, Stephen Thomas Erlewine of AllMusic wrote, "Rover's Return is an attempt to bring Waite back to the top of the charts that just doesn't work. That's not to say that the record is a complete failure, because there are portions that work quite well - the surging opener "These Times Are Hard for Lovers" is good radio rock, and Waite's voice always sounds good in this polished setting. Still, it's a little stiff and predictable, never quite reaching a level that's interesting, either as a period artifact or a piece of professional craft."

== Track listing ==
No.	Title	Writer(s)	Length
1.	"These Times Are Hard for Lovers"	Desmond Child, John Waite	4:12
2.	"Act of Love"	Waite	4:27
3.	"Encircled"	Waite, John McCurry, John Regan	4:23
4.	"Woman's Touch"	Waite	3:50
5.	"Wild One"	Waite	3:50
6.	"Don't Lose Any Sleep"	Diane Warren	3:45
7.	"Sometimes"	Dan Hartman, Charlie Midnight	4:55
8.	"She's the One"	Waite, Ivan Kral	5:47
9.	"Big Time for Love"	Waite, Rick Nowels	4:56

== Personnel ==
- John Waite – vocals
- Chuck Kentis – keyboards, synthesizers
- Gregg Mangiafico – keyboards, synthesizers
- Tommy Mandel – keyboards, synthesizers
- Arthur Stead – keyboards, synthesizers
- John McCurry – electric guitars, acoustic guitars
- Gary Myrick – guitar solo (9)
- John K (John James Kumnick) – bass guitar
- John Regan – bass guitar
- Mike Braun – drums
- Anton Fig – drums
- Thommy Price – drums
- Jimmy Bralower – drum programming
- Elaine Caswell – backing vocals
- Desmond Child – backing vocals
- Diana Grasselli – backing vocals
- Patty Forbes – backing vocals
- Louie Marlino – backing vocals
- Ellen Shipley – backing vocals
- Joe Lynn Turner – backing vocals
- Myriam Valle – backing vocals
- Maria Vidal – backing vocals
- Diane Warren – backing vocals

== Production ==
- John Waite – producer
- Frank Filipetti – producer, recording, mixing
- Desmond Child – producer (1)
- Rick Nowels – producer (6, 7)
- Dave Dale – additional engineer
- Michael Frondelli – additional engineer
- Bradshaw Leigh – additional engineer
- Tom Lord-Alge – additional engineer
- Phil Magnotti – additional engineer
- Billy Miranda – additional engineer, assistant engineer
- Arthur Payson – additional engineer
- Debi Cornish – assistant engineer
- Mark Cobrin – assistant engineer
- Jay Healy – assistant engineer
- Peter Hefter – assistant engineer
- Tim Kramer – assistant engineer
- Tim Leitner – assistant engineer
- Scott Mabuchi – assistant engineer
- Dan Mormando – assistant engineer
- Don Rodenbach – assistant engineer
- Craig Vogel – assistant engineer
- Paul D. Spriggs – production coordinator
- Trevor Key – photography
- Henry Marquez – art direction
- Norman Moore – art direction
- Richard Duardo – artwork (silkscreen print)

== Charts ==
Chart (1987)	Peak position
Australia (Kent Music Report)	99
Swedish Albums Chart	30
US (Billboard 200)	77
