= Cole Trickle =

- Days of Thunder character
- Tom Cruise as Cole Trickle
- First appearance: Days of Thunder (1990)
- Created by: Robert Towne; Tom Cruise
- Based on: Tim Richmond
- Portrayed by: Tom Cruise

In-universe information
- Title: NASCAR Cup Series driver
- Occupation: Racing driver
- Significant others: Dr. Claire Lewicki (girlfriend); Harry Hogge (crew chief)
- Relatives: unknown (father)
- Nationality: American

Cole Trickle is a fictional character and the main protagonist of the Days of Thunder franchise. He is portrayed by Tom Cruise. The character first appeared in the 1990 film Days of Thunder, and is set to be followed by the upcoming 2028 sequel film of the same name.

== Casting ==
Tom Cruise and Paul Newman testing a NASCAR Busch Series car for Hendrick Motorsports on January 3, 1987 at Daytona.

Cruise first got interested in motorsports during the filming of The Color of Money in 1986 with co-star Paul Newman introducing him to the sport.

On January 3, 1987, Cruise with Newman would test a NASCAR Busch Series car for Hendrick Motorsports at Daytona alongside Hendrick Winston Cup Series drivers Darrell Waltrip and. Geoff Bodine. Newman reached speeds well in excess of over 190mph, with Cruise only reaching up to 178mph after the engine had oil temp problems while still getting up to speed. After the test, Cruise went to dinner with Rick Hendrick that night and after hearing several stories exchanged between Hendrick and others, Cruise would start pitching the initial concept for the movie.

Later in 1987, Cruise started competing in SCCA competition starting out in the Showroom Stock A (SSA) class and progressing up to the GT3 class later in the year. Cruise would win 4 races in 16 starts in the SSA class, and score his first career win at Road America in the GT3 class.

Cruise would also later test Jack Sprague's Super Late Model at Concord Speedway around the end of 1989. Sprague would later state Cruise ran only 3 or 4 tenths off of Sprague's fastest time that day. Co-star Nicole Kidman would also take a ride in the car later in the day, hanging onto the x-bar and top roll bar, and with her sitting in the car, Cruise would run just 3 tenths slower than what he did in his fastest lap according to Sprague.

== Character and background ==
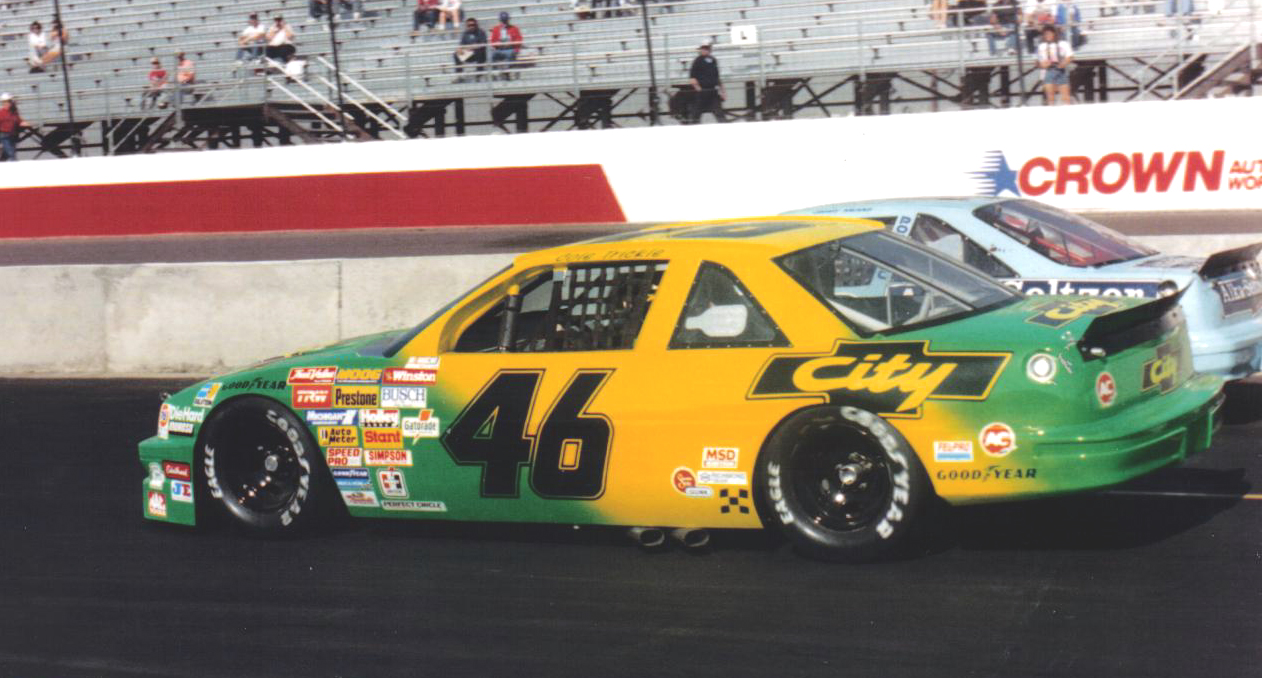
Trickle's No. 46 City Chevrolet, Chevrolet Lumina in one of the opening scenes at Phoenix.

Trickle is depicted as a young driver who enters the then NASCAR Winston Cup Series after having previously competing in dirt open-wheel racing. Although a talented driver, Trickle lacks experience with stock car racing and any type of mechanical knowledge. His aggressive driving style frequently put him at odds with his crew chief, Harry Hogge, who attempts to develop Trickle throughout the movie.

His rivalry with fellow driver Rowdy Burns eventually develops into a friendship later in the original film, following their crash at the midpoint of the movie at Daytona.

== Appearances ==
=== Days of Thunder ===
Trickle is introduced at the beginning of the film as a young dirt open-wheel racing driver from Eagle Rock, California, scouted by City Chevrolet owner Tim Daland (Randy Quaid) to compete in the NASCAR Winston Cup Series. Daland recruits veteran crew chief Harry Hogge (Robert Duvall) to oversee Trickle's move into stock car racing. Despite having natural talent, Trickle's aggressive driving style and lack of experience initially hinder his performance. He develops a rivalry with fellow driver Rowdy Burns (Michael Rooker), eventually earning his first Cup Series victory at Darlington.

At the Firecracker 400 at Daytona, Trickle and Burns are both involved in a crash on the backstretch that leaves both hospitalized. During recovery, Trickle develops a romantic relationship with neurosurgeon Dr. Claire Lewicki (Nicole Kidman) and begins to form a friendship with Burns. Although he is later cleared to return to racing, Trickle struggles heavily with his confidence and faces increased competition from his initial replacement and now teammate, Russ Wheeler (Cary Elwes), ultimately leading to Trickle's dismissal from Daland's team following him wrecking Wheeler during Wheeler's post-race celebration at Darlington.

When Burns is unable to compete in the Daytona 500 due to his medical condition, he offers Trickle to drive his No. 51. Now reunited with Hogge, Trickle overcomes his injury, defeating Wheeler on the final lap to win the Daytona 500.

== In popular culture ==
Will Ferrell's character Ricky Bobby briefly references Cruise's character in the 2006 film Talladega Nights: The Ballad of Ricky Bobby.

Cole is referenced in the 2007 film Redline, featuring a flashback shot of Trickle's wreck at Daytona in the original movie.

=== Throwbacks ===
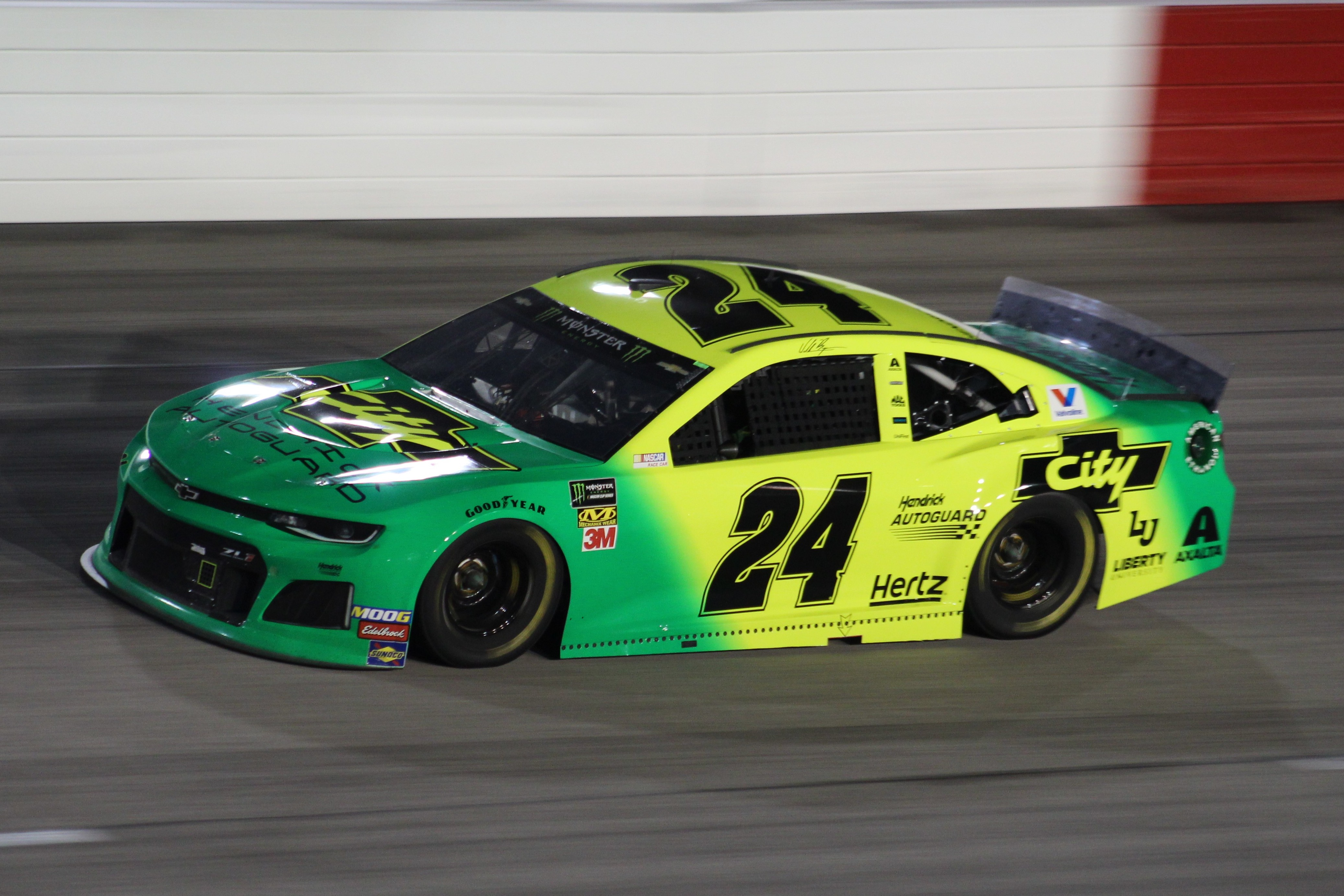
William Byron sporting a throwback to Trickle's No. 46 City Chevrolet, Chevrolet Lumina from the film.

Several race teams and drivers in NASCAR and other forms of motorsports have donned throwback paint schemes to Trickle's paint schemes from the movie. Notable examples include:

- Kurt Busch in the 2013 Subway Firecracker 250 at Daytona in the NASCAR Nationwide Series.
- Kyle Larson in the 2015 Bojangles' Southern 500 at Darlington in the NASCAR Sprint Cup Series.
- James Davison across multiple races during the 2017 NASCAR Xfinity Series season.
- Cody Ware in the 2017 Bojangles' Southern 500 at Darlington in the Monster Energy NASCAR Cup Series.
- William Byron in the 2019 Bojangles' Southern 500 at Darlington in the Monster Energy NASCAR Cup Series.
- Brennan Poole across multiple races during the 2022 NASCAR Camping World Truck Series season.
- Thomas Annunziata in the 2024 Hard Rock Bet 200 at Daytona in the ARCA Menards Series.
- Ryan Ellis in the 2024 Crown Royal Purple Bag Project 200 at Darlington in the NASCAR Xfinity Series.
- Leland Honeyman in the 2024 Crown Royal Purple Bag Project 200 at Darlington in the NASCAR Xfinity Series.

== Reception ==
In his June 1990 review of the original film Roger Ebert described the character of Trickle as an example of a recurring protagonist in Cruise's films: a young man that is talented but inexperienced whose impulsive behavior must be tempered through the guidance of an older mentor. Ebert compared the character's development to those of Cruise's previous roles in Top Gun, The Color of Money, and Cocktail, noting that the film relied on a familiar formula despite its widely different setting.

Others were more critical of Trickle's characterization. Vince Leo heavily criticized the character's arrogance and reckless behavior, arguing that his actions made him difficult to sympathize with despite his position as the film's protagonist.
