= Mask of Smiles =

Studio album by John Waite
- Released: 26 July 1985
- Recorded: 1984–1985
- Studios: Clinton Recording Studios and Hell's Kitchen Studios (New York City, New York)
- Genres: Rock, pop
- Length: 33:14
- Label: EMI
- Producers: John Waite; Stephen Galfas

John Waite chronology
| No Brakes (1984) | Mask of Smiles (1985) | Rover's Return (1987) |

Professional ratings
Review scores
| Source | Rating |
|---|---|
| AllMusic | 3/5 stars |

Mask of Smiles is the third solo album by British rock singer-songwriter John Waite. It was released in mid-1985. The previous year, Waite's "Missing You" was a No. 1 hit.

There were two singles released from this disc. The first, "Every Step of the Way", was a No. 25 hit on Billboard's Hot 100, aided by a music video. The other single, "Welcome to Paradise", fared less well, peaking at No. 85 Pop. The album itself peaked at No. 36 on the Billboard album chart.

== Track listing ==
1. "Every Step of the Way" (John Waite, Ivan Král) – 4:09
2. "Laydown" (Waite) – 3:30
3. "Welcome to Paradise" (Waite) – 3:55
4. "Lust for Life" (Waite, John McCurry) – 3:02
5. "Ain't That Peculiar" (Smokey Robinson, Pete Moore, Marv Tarplin, Ronald White) – 3:07
6. "Just Like Lovers" (Waite, Tommy Mandel) – 4:29
7. "The Choice" (Waite) – 4:25
8. "You're the One" (Waite, Chuck Kentis) – 3:18
9. "No Brakes" (Waite) – 3:14

== Personnel ==
- John Waite – vocals
- Tommy Mandel – keyboards, synthesizers
- Chuck Kentis – electric piano
- John McCurry – lead guitars
- "Bingo" – guitars, acoustic guitar, backing vocals
- Ritchie Fliegler – Rickenbacker 12-string guitar
- Johnny Thunders – guitars (10)
- Donnie Nossov – bass guitar
- Carmine Rojas – bass guitar
- Joey Vasta – bass guitar
- Alan Childs – drums
- Frankie LaRocka – drums, ash tray
- The Borneo Horns (Steve Elson and Stan Harrison) – horns
- Lenny Pickett – tenor sax solo (6)
- Melanie X (Melanie Burkett) – backing vocals (5)

== Production ==
- John Waite – producer, mixing (1, 2, 6–9)
- Stephen Galfas – producer, engineer (1, 2, 6–9), mixing (1, 2, 6–9)
- Bingo – engineer (1, 2, 6–9)
- Gary Hellman – engineer (3–5)
- John Luongo – remixing (3–5)
- Gene Curtis – assistant engineer (1, 2, 6–9)
- Chris Isca – assistant engineer (1, 2, 6–9)
- Ken Steiger – assistant engineer (3–5)
- Frederick Galfas – studio assistant
- Tony Recascino – studio assistant
- George Marino – mastering at Sterling Sound (New York, NY).
- Henry Marquez – art direction
- Mick Haggerty – artwork, design
- Noriski Yokosuka – photography
- Maxine Van-Cliffe Arakawa – fashion coordinator
- Kansai Man – clothing
- AMI (Stephen Machat and Rick Smith) – management
- All Songs Published By House Of Cards (adm. Walk On Moon Music).
