= Havana 3am (album) =

Studio album by Havana 3am
- Released: 1991
- Genre: Rock
- Length: 45:20
- Label: I.R.S.
- Producer: Havana 3am

Havana 3am chronology
Havana 3am (1991)	Texas Glitter & Tombstone Tales (1996)

Professional ratings
Review scores
Source	Rating
AllMusic	3/5 stars
Mojo	3/5 stars
Q	3/5 stars

Havana 3am is the debut album by the rock supergroup Havana 3am. The woman shown on the cover was bassist Paul Simonon's girlfriend at the time.

== Track listing ==
All tracks composed by Nigel Dixon, Gary Myrick and Paul Simonon.

No.	Title	Length
1.	"Joyride"	02:58
2.	"Blue Motorcycle Eyes"	03:55
3.	"Reach the Rock"	04:16
4.	"Death in the Afternoon"	04:21
5.	"Hole in the Sky"	02:49
6.	"What About Your Future"	04:44
7.	"The Hardest Game"	03:51
8.	"Hey Amigo"	04:28
9.	"Life on the Line"	04:06
10.	"Surf in the City"	02:40
11.	"Blue Gene Vincent"	03:30
12.	"Living in This Town"	04:18
Total length:		45:20

== Personnel ==
Havana 3am

- Nigel Dixon – lead vocals, rhythm guitar
- Gary Myrick – lead guitar, acoustic guitar, backing vocals
- Paul Simonon – bass guitar, backing vocals, harmonica
- Travis Williams – drums, percussion

with:

- Derek Holt – harpsichord
- Gus Andrews – Mexican horns

Technical

- Masahiko Yamazaki – engineer
- Geoff Perrin – mixing engineer
- Mike Laye – cover photograph
