= Figure in a Landscape (album) =

Studio album by John Waite
- Released: 21 August 2001
- Length: 48:46
- Label: Gold Circle Records
- Producer: John Waite; Ed Thacker

John Waite chronology
When You Were Mine (1997)	Figure in a Landscape (2001)	The Hard Way (2004)

Figure in a Landscape is the seventh studio album by English singer and musician John Waite, which was released by Gold Circle Records in 2001.

== Background ==
Figure in a Landscape followed Waite's 1997 album When You Were Mine, which had failed to achieve commercial success and did not receive full support from its label, Mercury. While living in Los Angeles, Waite accepted a record deal offered by Norm Waitt of Gold Circle Records. Waite then began recording Figure in a Landscape, which saw him continue to work closely with guitarist Shane Fontayne, who had contributed to Waite's last two albums. Prior to recording Figure in a Landscape, Waite embarked on a pre-studio tour.

The album was approached by Waite as a way of "getting back to basics". Speaking to Billboard in 2001, Waite said of the album, "It brought me back to the music, and it eliminated everything else. It reminded me of why I was in this business in the first place. I got a refresher course in why I'm John Waite." Waite also recalled for his official website, "Making the record was slower than I was used to. The songs were strong and I had Shane so I focused on the vibe, not the clock."

"Keys to Your Heart" was released as the album's lead single. Waite said of the song to The Weekender in 2001, "I think that song is just my version of saying everything is OK and that we should just relax and have a great time this summer." The second and final single, "Fly", peaked at No. 27 on the Billboard Adult Contemporary chart in December 2001. To promote the album, Waite embarked on a tour with Journey and Peter Frampton.

== Critical reception ==
Professional ratings
Review scores
Source	Rating
AllMusic	2/5 stars

Doug Stone of AllMusic considered the album to attempt a "mature, adult contemporary atmosphere", but felt it "comes across as competent, countrified ennui" instead. He praised some of the tracks such as "Keys to Your Heart", "NYC Girl", "Thinking About You" and "Godhead", but felt some of the other songs were "yawners".

== Track listing ==
No.	Title	Writer(s)	Length
1.	"Keys to Your Heart"	John Waite, Anthony Krizan	3:42
2.	"Always Be Your Man"	Waite, Charles Kentis	4:42
3.	"Thinking About You"	Waite, Krizan	4:24
4.	"NYC Girl"	Waite, Glen Burtnik	4:51
5.	"Fly"	Jonathon Mead, Radford	4:20
6.	"New Thing"	Waite, Shane Fontayne	4:41
7.	"Special One"	Waite, Will Jennings	4:03
8.	"Whenever You Come Around"	Vince Gill, Pete Wasner	4:04
9.	"Touch"	Waite, Fontayne	4:18
10.	"Godhead"	Waite, Fontayne	5:29
11.	"Masterpiece of Loneliness"	Waite, Wasner	4:08

2009 No Brakes Records CD reissue bonus track
No.	Title	Length
12.	"Keys To Your Heart" (Alternate Version)	4:26

== Personnel ==
- John Waite – lead and backing vocals
- Chuck Kentis – keyboards, programming
- Shane Fontayne – electric guitars, acoustic guitar, 6-string bass, backing vocals
- Don Kirkpatrick – electric guitars, acoustic guitar
- Anthony Krizan – guitars, backing vocals
- Lance Morrison – bass (1–4, 6, 8–11)
- Donnie Nossov – bass (5, 7)
- Jonathan Dresel – drums, percussion
- Debby Holiday – harmony vocals (5, 7, 10)

== Production ==
- Steve Barri – executive producer
- Shiva Baum – associate executive producer
- John Waite – producer
- Ed Thacker – producer
- Chuck Kentis – additional production (2, 3)
- Shane Fontayne – additional production (6, 9)
- Rob Dillman – production supervisor
- Derek Englund – engineer
- Chris Reynolds – engineer
- Jeff Thomas – engineer
- Henry Reth – assistant engineer
- Stephen Marcussen – mastering
- Nicholas Zurcher – photography
- Phillip Kovac – management
