= Temple Bar (album) =

Studio album by John Waite
- Released: April 11, 1995
- Length: 42:44
- Label: Imago
- Producer: Mike Shipley

John Waite chronology
| Rover's Return (1987) | Temple Bar (1995) | When You Were Mine (1997) |

Temple Bar is the fifth studio album by English singer and musician John Waite, released by Imago on April 11, 1995. The album was produced by Mike Shipley.

The album's lead single, "How Did I Get By Without You" peaked at No. 89 on the US Billboard Hot 100 and remained on the chart for eight weeks. It also reached No. 20 on the Billboard Adult Contemporary chart. "Ain't No Sunshine" was also issued as a promotional single.

== Background ==
After the release of his fourth studio album, Rover's Return, in 1987, Waite joined the supergroup Bad English. When Waite left the group in 1991, he took some time away from the music business before returning to his solo career. He told The Record in 1995: "Being in Bad English was too much of a compromise. Instead of being true to the artistic side, there was this incredible pressure to keep producing the same kind of hits."

Waite's return to his solo career was based on his "pure love of the music", with the material on Temple Bar inspired by Waite's recent divorce: "I wanted to describe my life to me and to tell the truth". When Waite was offered a contract with Terry Ellis' new label Imago, Waite agreed on the condition that the album he made "wouldn't be a rock record". Speaking of the period on his official website, Waite recalled: "Terry Ellis gave me generous deal and I was able to move back into the city for several months to record. It's the only time I've ever had the head of a company tell me to make the record I wanted to make. I did. Temple Bar was the best I'd done to that point."

== Reception ==
Professional ratings
Review scores
| Source | Rating |
|---|---|
| AllMusic | 3.5/5 stars |

Upon release, Stephanie Riefe of the Hartford Courant described the album as an "accessible, easy listen" and wrote: "Temple Bar is full of trademark Waite touches: great turns of phrase and truckloads of sentimentality. The surprise is that it's good. The music is pleasing, and the lyrics aren't so fluffy that they float off the page." Brian S. Maloney of the Santa Cruz Sentinel considered the album to be "much more promising" than the material produced by Bad English. He commented: "The sincerity has returned and his solo music is more three-dimensional than those bland recent collaborations. It does go to show that sometimes old rockers still have a trick or two up their sleeves."

== Track listing ==
| No. | Title | Writer(s) | Length |
|---|---|---|---|
| 1. | "How Did I Get By Without You" | John Waite, Mark Spiro, Tim Pierce | 4:02 |
| 2. | "Someone Like You" | Van Morrison | 4:50 |
| 3. | "Price of My Tears" | Waite, John DeNicola | 3:43 |
| 4. | "Ain't No Sunshine" | Bill Withers | 3:38 |
| 5. | "Downtown" | Waite, Glen Burtnik | 5:07 |
| 6. | "In God's Shadow" | Keith Reid, Waite, Anthony Krizan, DeNicola | 5:50 |
| 7. | "I'm So Lonesome I Could Cry" | Hank Williams | 2:30 |
| 8. | "The Glittering Prize" | Waite, Krizan | 5:13 |
| 9. | "More" | Waite, Krizan | 4:10 |
| 10. | "In Dreams" | Waite, Spiro | 3:41 |

== Personnel ==
- John Waite – lead vocals, rhythm guitar (3), backing vocals (8), bass (10)
- Shane Fontayne – electric guitar (1, 3, 4, 6), acoustic guitar (3, 4), guitars (5, 8–10)
- Jack Johnson – electric guitar (1, 6)
- Nick Moroch – acoustic guitar (1, 6)
- Chuck Kentis – acoustic guitar (2), strings (2, 5), keyboards (4, 6), acoustic piano (5)
- Jeff Golub – guitars (2), dobro (7)
- Tim Pierce – electric guitar (6), guitars (10)
- Erik Sanko – bass (1, 2)
- Donnie Nossov – bass (3, 4, 8)
- John DeNicola – bass (6)
- Tony Beard – drums (1–4, 6, 8)
- Jimmy Keegan – drums (10)
- Michael Fisher – tambourine (3, 4, 8)
- Mark Spiro – backing vocals (1, 10), acoustic guitar (10)
- Tommy Funderburk – backing vocals (8)

Production

- Mike Shipley – producer, mixing
- Mark Spiro – producer (10)
- John Waite – producer (10), arrangements
- Tony Phillips – engineer
- Dan Marnien – additional engineer
- Donal Bray – assistant engineer
- Eric Flickinger – assistant engineer
- Tim Gerron – assistant engineer
- Jen Monnar – assistant engineer
- George Marino – mastering at Sterling Sound (New York, NY)
- Alastair Thain – photography
- Gold Mountain Entertainment – management
