= These Times Are Hard for Lovers =

Single by John Waite

from the album Rover's Return
- B-side: "Wild One"
- Released: 27 July 1987 (UK)
- Length: 4:12
- Label: EMI America
- Songwriter(s): Desmond Child; John Waite
- Producer(s): Desmond Child; Frank Filipetti; John Waite

John Waite singles chronology
"If Anybody Had a Heart" (1986)	"These Times Are Hard for Lovers" (1987)	"Don't Lose Any Sleep" (1987)

"These Times Are Hard for Lovers" is a song by English musician John Waite, which was released in 1987 as the lead single from his fourth studio album Rover's Return. The song was written by Desmond Child and Waite, and produced by Child, Frank Filipetti and Waite.

"These Times Are Hard for Lovers" peaked at No. 53 on the US Billboard Hot 100 and remained in the charts for sixteen weeks. The song also reached No. 77 in the UK Singles Chart and remained in the Top 100 for three weeks. The song's music video was directed by Jeff Stein.

== Critical reception ==
Upon its release, Jon Hotten of Kerrang! called it "another excellent tune from the sorely underrated, in the UK at least, Mr Waite". He noted Waite's "usual panache", but added he "can't help feeling that his voice is a little lightweight for chantalong stuff like this, though". In the US, Billboard described the song as a "sharp, dramatic rock track" and praised its commercial potential by claiming it "could very well do the trick". Cash Box listed the single as one of their "feature picks" during June 1987 and commented: "It is a tougher, more sinewy effort than his other solo singles, hearkening back to his Babys' days." Larry Seel, writing for the Orlando Sentinel, commented: "The song has a rocking little melody that's bound to implant itself somewhere in your brain". He considered the song's music video to be "full of pep" and "reminiscent" of Rod Stewart's "Some Guys Have All the Luck". In a review of Rover's Return, Stephen Thomas Erlewine of AllMusic retrospectively described the song as a "surging opener" and "good radio rock", with Waite's voice "sound[ing] good in this polished setting".

== Track listing ==
7" single

1. "These Times Are Hard for Lovers" - 4:12
2. "Wild One" - 3:50

7" single (US promo)

1. "These Times Are Hard for Lovers" - 4:12
2. "These Times Are Hard for Lovers" - 4:12

12" single (UK release)

1. "These Times Are Hard for Lovers" (Jellybean Mix) - 6:01
2. "Wild One" - 3:50
3. "Missing You" (7" Version) - 4:01

12" single (European release)

1. "These Times Are Hard for Lovers" (Jellybean Mix) - 6:01
2. "These Times Are Hard for Lovers" (LP Version) - 4:12
3. "These Times Are Hard for Lovers" (Instrumental) - 4:31

12" single (US release)

1. "These Times Are Hard for Lovers" (Jellybean Mix) - 6:01
2. "These Times Are Hard for Lovers" (LP Version) - 4:12
3. "These Times Are Hard for Lovers" (Extended Rock Mix) - 6:26
4. "These Times Are Hard for Lovers" (Jellybean Edit) - 5:15
5. "Wild One" - 3:50

CD single (US promo)

1. "These Times Are Hard for Lovers" - 4:12

== Personnel ==
Production

- Desmond Child, Frank Filipetti, John Waite - producers of "These Times Are Hard for Lovers"
- Frank Filipetti, John Waite - producers of "Wild One"
- John Waite, David Thoener, Gary Gersh - producers of "Missing You"
- Jellybean - remix on "Jellybean Mix" and "Jellybean Edit"
- Fernando Kral - assistant engineer on "Jellybean Mix"
- Michael Hutchinson - remix engineer on "Jellybean Mix"
- Rusty Garner - remix on "Extended Rock Mix" and "Instrumental"
- Paul Sabu - remix engineer on "Instrumental", engineer on "Missing You"
- John Luongo - remix and editing on "Missing You"

== Charts ==
Chart (1987)	Peak position
Australia (Kent Music Report)	59
German Singles Chart	72
UK Singles Chart	77
US Billboard Hot 100	53
US Billboard Album Rock Tracks	6
