= Don't Lose Any Sleep =

1987 single by John Waite

Single by John Waite

from the album Rover's Return
- B-side: "Wild One"
- Released: 1987
- Length: 3:45
- Label: EMI America
- Songwriter(s): Diane Warren
- Producer(s): Frank Filipetti; Rick Nowels; John Waite

John Waite singles chronology
"These Times Are Hard for Lovers" (1987)	"Don't Lose Any Sleep" (1987)	"Deal for Life" (1990)

"Don't Lose Any Sleep" is a song by English musician John Waite, which was released in 1987 as the second and final single from his fourth studio album Rover's Return. The song was written by Diane Warren, and produced by Frank Filipetti, Rick Nowels and Waite. "Don't Lose Any Sleep" peaked at No. 81 on the US Billboard Hot 100 and remained in the charts for four weeks.

The song's music video was directed by Kort Falkenberg, who also directed the video for Waite's 1984 hit "Missing You". It was shot on location in Los Angeles, as well as at the Chaplin Stage at A&M Studios. The video achieved breakout rotation on MTV.

== Critical reception ==
On its release, Billboard described the song as a "churning midtempo ballad" and a "strong chart contender" that recalled "Missing You". Dave Sholin, writing for the Gavin Report, commented: "No doubt "Missing You" inspired this effort, which is a compliment in itself. John works his magic and energy into yet another terrific tune written by the prolific Diane Warren."

== Track listing ==
7" single

1. "Don't Lose Any Sleep" (Single Version) - 3:45
2. "Wild One" - 3:49

7" single (US promo)

1. "Don't Lose Any Sleep" (Single Version) - 3:45
2. "Don't Lose Any Sleep" (Single Version) - 3:45

12" single (US promo)

1. "Don't Lose Any Sleep" (Single Version) - 3:45
2. "Don't Lose Any Sleep" (Single Version) - 3:45

== Cover versions ==
- In 1989, American singer Robin Beck covered the song for her second studio album Trouble or Nothin'. It was released as a single in Europe.
- In 1990, Swedish singer Jim Jidhed covered the song for his debut studio album Jim.
- In 1991, American rock band Starship covered the song for their compilation album Greatest Hits (Ten Years and Change 1979–1991).

== Personnel ==
Production

- Frank Filipetti, Rick Nowels, John Waite - producers of "Don't Lose Any Sleep"
- Frank Filipetti - remixer on "Single Version" of "Don't Lose Any Sleep"
- Frank Filipetti, John Waite - producers of "Wild One"

== Charts ==
Chart (1987)	Peak position
US Billboard Hot 100	81
