= Gary Myrick =

American musician

Gary Myrick is an American singer, songwriter and guitarist.

== Career ==
Born in Dallas, Texas, Gary Myrick played guitar and sang in Dallas and neighboring Fort Worth starting as a teenager. Eventually, he built a significant enough reputation to be asked to join Austin, Texas band Krackerjack, replacing Stevie Ray Vaughan who had left to begin his solo career.

After belonging with KrackerJack, Gary formed a band called Slip o’the Wrist that played nothing but original Texas blues rock songs.

After relocating to Los Angeles, California, he formed Gary Myrick & the Figures, releasing a self-titled album in 1980 which included the hit "She Talks in Stereo", which peaked at number 56 in Australia. The band then released the LP Living in a Movie (1981) before breaking up in 1982. Myrick released the solo EP Language (1983), which featured the percussive single "Guitar, Talk, Love & Drums" and an MTV hit "Message is You". His combination of blues, rock and new wave won him airplay on modern rock radio stations in the United States and exposure on MTV throughout the 1980s. Two of his songs, "She Talks in Stereo" and "Time to Win", were used in the 1983 film Valley Girl.

Myrick took a break from his solo work to write four songs and play guitar on John Waite's No Brakes album, which included Waite's biggest solo hit "Missing You" and reached the top spot on the Billboard album chart in 1984. The following year came Myrick's LP Stand for Love with the single "When Angels Kiss" and a re-recording of "She Talks in Stereo." For the next few years, Myrick concentrated on work as a session and touring guitarist before joining his next group.

Paul Simonon (former bassist of The Clash), Nigel Dixon (former lead singer of Whirlwind) and Myrick united to form Havana 3 am. The band released a self-titled album in 1991, melding rockabilly, Latin and punk traditions. After Simonon left the band, Myrick began work on the next Havana 3 am album with Dixon. Dixon, however died of cancer in 1993. Myrick rebuilt Havana 3 am and completed the Texas Glitter and Tombstone Tales album in 1996 with Tom Felicetta and Jamie Chez.

Moving towards roots rock, Myrick switched to a stripped down, acoustic approach for his 2001 solo release, Waltz of the Scarecrow King. Reinvent the Gods, featuring a cover of the Rolling Stones' "As Tears Go By," was self-released in 2004.

Myrick continues to play solo but also performs as a session and touring guitarist. He has worked with Big Audio Dynamite, Jackson Browne, members of the Eagles, Steve Jones (former guitarist of the Sex Pistols), Wilson Pickett, Queen Ida, Bonnie Raitt, Todd Rundgren, Brian Wilson, Stevie Wonder and others. He has also done some work scoring films.

Gary Myrick and the Figures reunited in 2010 with their first concert in Hollywood, California at The Roxy on June 22.

Myrick played guitar and sang on the 2013 album by Carla Olson, Have Harmony, Will Travel.

Myrick contributed "Train Kept A-Rollin'" to the 2021 Renew / BMG album Americana Railroad.

== Discography ==
=== Albums ===
- Gary Myrick & the Figures (1980) No. 203 US
- Living in a Movie (1981)
- Language (1983) No. 138 US
- Stand for Love (1985)
- Havana 3 am (as member of Havana 3 am) (1991) No. 169 US
- Texas Glitter and Tombstone Tales (1996)
- Waltz of the Scarecrow King (2001)
- Reinvent the Gods (2004)
- Guitarista (2013)
- Gary Myrick's Bluestrash (2015)
