= John Waite =

British musician (born 1952)

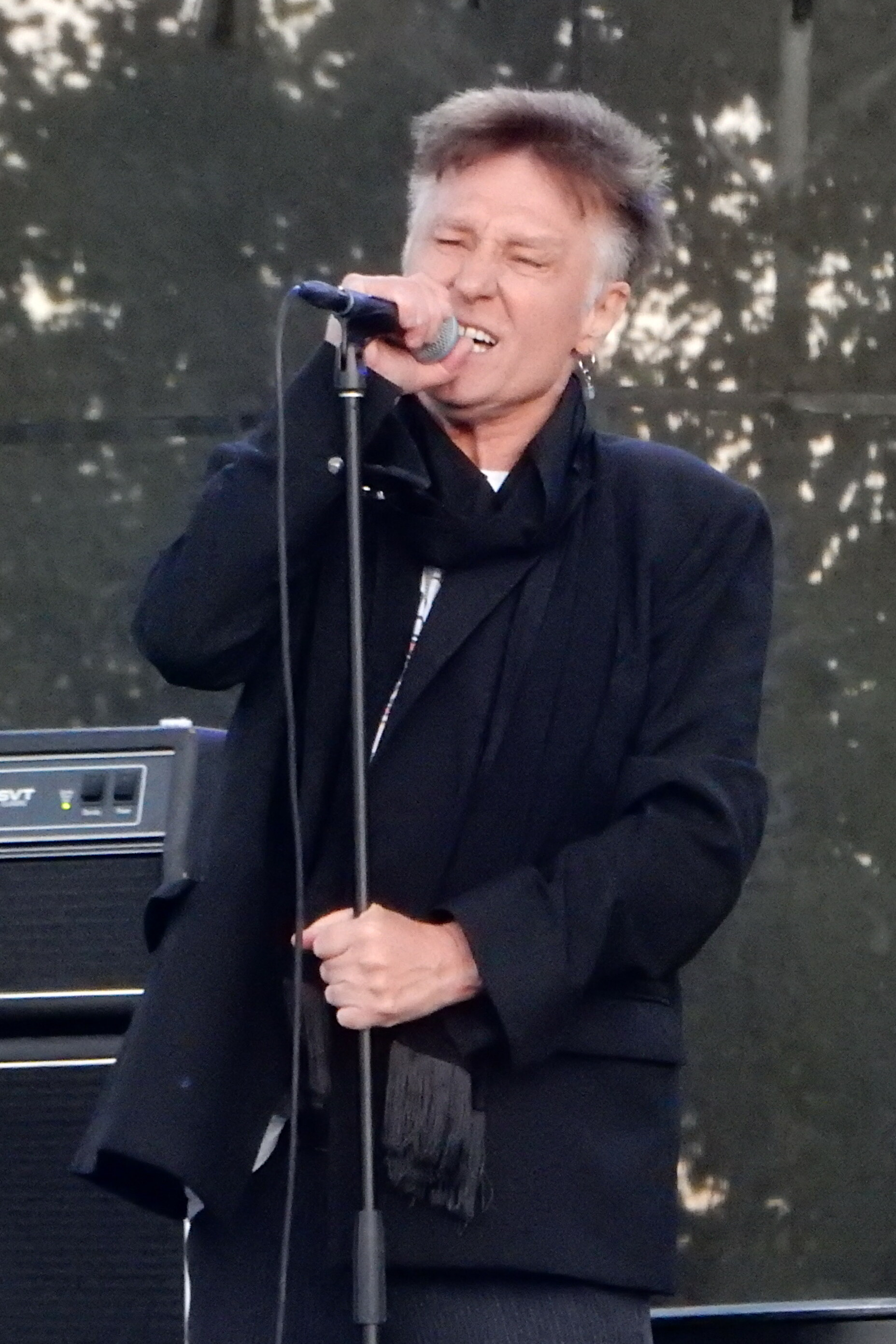
- Waite performing at the Tulalip Amphitheatre in 2021

Background information
- Born: John Charles Waite; 4 July 1952 (age 74); Lancaster, Lancashire, England
- Origin: London, England
- Genres: Pop rock; hard rock; power pop; country
- Occupations: Singer; musician; songwriter
- Instruments: Vocals; guitar; bass guitar
- Years active: 1975–present
- Labels: Chrysalis; EMI; Epic; Gold Circle; Rounder; No Brakes; Imago; Frontiers; Mercury
- Formerly of: The Babys; Bad English; Ringo Starr & His All-Starr Band
- Website: johnwaiteworldwide.com

John Charles Waite (born 4 July 1952) is an English rock musician. As a solo artist, he has released ten studio albums and is best known for the 1984 hit single "Missing You", which reached No. 1 on the US Billboard Hot 100 and the top ten on the UK singles chart. He was also the lead vocalist and bassist for the rock bands the Babys and Bad English.

== Early life and education ==
Waite was born and raised in Lancaster, Lancashire, and was educated at Greaves Secondary Modern and Lancaster Art College (The Storey Institute).

== Career ==
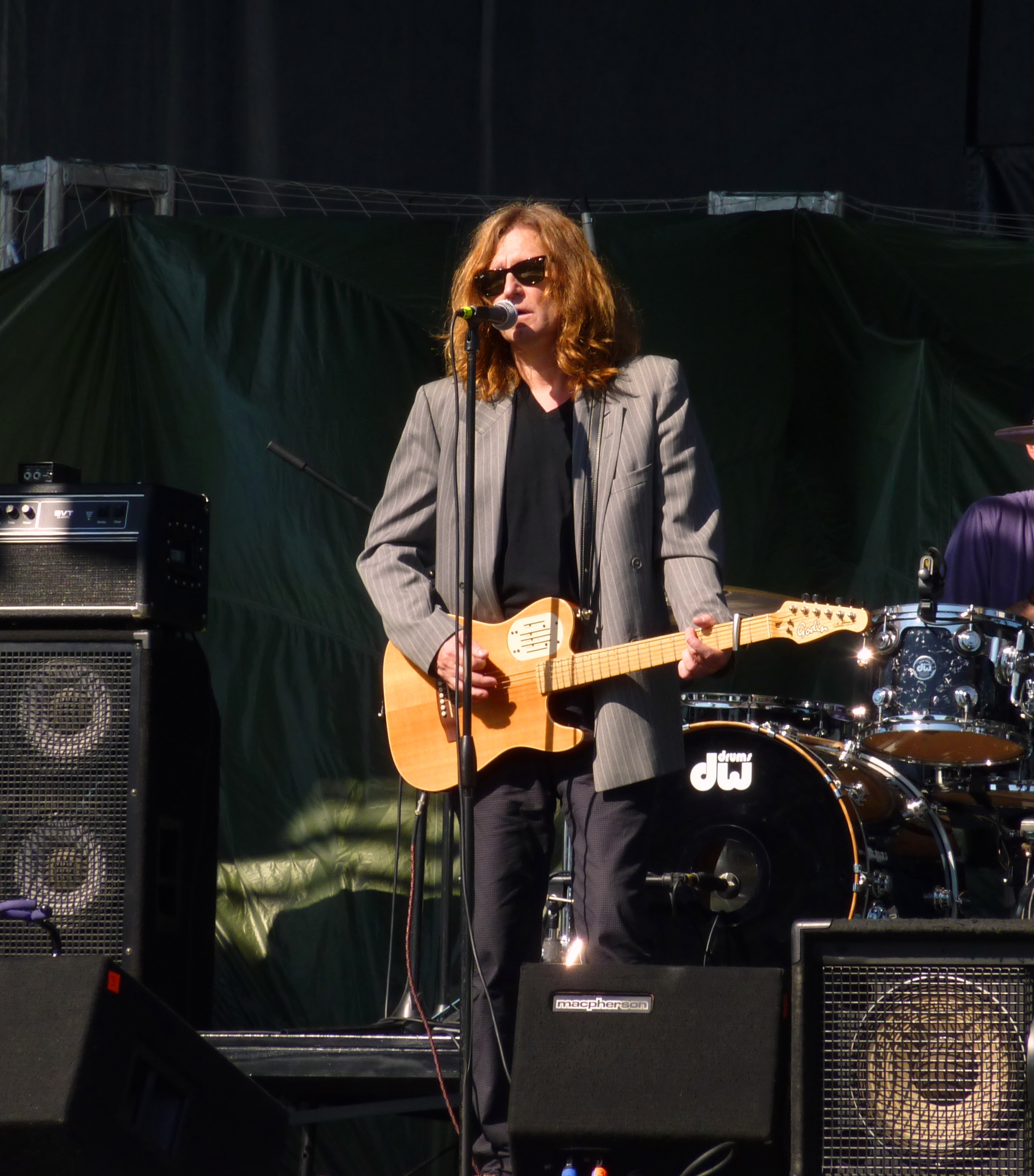
Waite at soundcheck before the 2011 Surf and Song Festival

=== The Babys ===
As a performer, Waite first came to attention as the lead singer and bassist of the Babys, a British rock band that had moderate chart success. The band achieved two pop hits that each peaked at No. 13 on the Billboard Hot 100, "Isn't It Time" (1977) and "Everytime I Think of You" (1978), and a solid following of their concert tours. Over the course of five years, the band produced five albums ending with the final album On the Edge in October 1980, after which the group disbanded.

=== Solo work ===
Waite subsequently launched his solo career with his 1982 debut album Ignition, which produced the hit single "Change". The Chrysalis 45 failed to chart on the Billboard Hot 100 during its initial release (May 1982) but was a top track on AOR radio stations, as well as a very popular music video on MTV as the 'new' cable channel celebrated its first full year of operation. The song was originally recorded in 1981 (with slightly different lyrics) by the American rock band Spider (which featured Amanda Blue, Holly Knight, and Anton Fig) and in 1985 was included on the platinum-selling Vision Quest soundtrack. When the single was reissued, it reached the Top 60 on the Hot 100. "Going to the Top" was released as the original follow-up single to "Change".

In 1984, Waite guest-starred on three episodes of the TV series Paper Dolls. The shows featured his songs "Missing You" and "Tears".

Waite's next album, No Brakes, resulted in international success. It was a Top 10 Billboard album in the US due to the smash hit "Missing You" which went to No. 1 on the US Billboard Hot 100 singles chart. It knocked Tina Turner's "What's Love Got To Do With It?" out of No. 1. For that very reason, Turner later recorded and released Waite's smash song herself. (Turner's single peaked at No. 84 on Billboard's Hot 100 in 1996). "Missing You" also hit No. 1 on Billboard's Album Rock Tracks as well as the Top 10 of Billboard's Adult Contemporary chart. No Brakes sold over a million and a half US copies, yet has never been certified above the RIAA Gold standard (a record company must apply to the RIAA for such certification). Two more singles from No Brakes followed, including "Tears" which was a Top 10 hit on the Billboard Mainstream Rock chart.

The next album Mask of Smiles followed in 1985, featuring the hit single "Every Step of the Way". Another single, "If Anybody Had a Heart", was released from the soundtrack of the 1986 film About Last Night.... In 1987, Rover's Return was released with the single "These Times Are Hard for Lovers". Waite would have another soundtrack appearance in 1990 from Days of Thunder with "Deal for Life".

=== Bad English ===
In 1988, Waite joined former Babys bandmates Jonathan Cain and Ricky Phillips, along with Neal Schon and drummer Deen Castronovo from Journey, to form the supergroup Bad English. In 1989, the Bad English ballad "When I See You Smile" (penned by Diane Warren) went to No. 1 on Billboard Hot 100 and earned a Gold-certified single. Its parent album reached Billboard's Top Five and sold nearly two million copies in the United States alone. Bad English released two albums before tensions amongst the members led to the band's dissolution by 1992.

=== Return to solo work ===
Waite then returned to solo work. He released the album Temple Bar (1995), When You Were Mine (1997), Figure in a Landscape (2001), The Hard Way (2004), Downtown: Journey of a Heart (2007) and Rough & Tumble (2011). He has continued to tour, such as in 2003 with Ringo Starr & His All-Starr Band.

In 2006, "Missing You" was released as a duet with Alison Krauss and reached the Top 40 on the Country Charts in the United States. Waite appeared with Krauss on The Tonight Show on 5 February 2007 to perform the song. Waite's songs have reappeared in other media as well: 2013 saw "Missing You" featured heavily in the movie Warm Bodies, and "Change" is on the soundtrack of the US movie Anchorman 2: The Legend Continues.

=== Copyright lawsuit ===
On 5 February 2019, Waite and Joe Ely filed a class-action lawsuit against Universal Music Group (UMG) claiming the company had violated their right to terminate grants of copyright. On 3 May 2019, UMG filed a motion to dismiss the case. In January 2023, a federal judge ruled that Waite and hundreds of other artists could not join forces to sue UMG to regain control of their masters, saying the case raised big questions about “fairness” but that it was ill-suited for class-action litigation. Waite's lawsuit was settled in March 2024.

=== Documentary ===
Waite was the subject of the 2022 biographical documentary John Waite: The Hard Way.

== Personal life ==
Waite has lived in Santa Monica, California since 2014. He previously lived in New York City.

== Discography ==
=== Studio albums ===
| Year | Album details | Peak chart positions | | | | Certifications (sales threshold) |
| Year | Album details | UK | AUS | SWE | US | Certifications (sales threshold) |
|---|---|---|---|---|---|---|
| 1982 | Ignition: First studio album; Release date: 21 May 1982; Label: Chrysalis Records | — | — | — | 68 | |
| 1984 | No Brakes: Second studio album; Release date: 15 June 1984; Label: EMI | 64 | 27 | — | 10 | US: Gold; CAN: Platinum |
| 1985 | Mask of Smiles: Third studio album; Release date: 26 July 1985; Label: EMI | — | — | — | 36 | |
| 1987 | Rover's Return: Fourth studio album; Release date: 19 June 1987; Label: EMI | — | 99 | 30 | 77 | |
| 1995 | Temple Bar: Fifth studio album; Release date: 14 February 1995; Label: Imago Records | — | — | — | — | |
| 1997 | When You Were Mine: Sixth studio album; Release date: 23 September 1997; Label: Mercury Records | — | — | — | — | |
| 2001 | Figure in a Landscape: Seventh studio album; Release date: 21 August 2001; Label: Gold Circle Records | — | — | — | — | |
| 2004 | The Hard Way: Eighth studio album; Release date: 21 September 2004; Label: No Brakes | — | — | — | — | |
| 2007 | Downtown: Journey of a Heart: Ninth studio album; Release date: 9 January 2007; Label: Rounder Records | — | — | — | — | |
| 2011 | Rough & Tumble: Tenth studio album; Release date: 2011; Label: Frontiers Records | — | — | — | — | |
"—" denotes releases that did not chart

=== Live albums ===
| Year | Album | Label |
|---|---|---|
| 2001 | Live & Rare Tracks | One Way |
| 2010 | In Real Time | Frontiers Records |
| 2013 | Live – All Access | No Brakes Records |

=== Compilation albums ===
| Year | Album | Label |
|---|---|---|
| 1992 | The Essential John Waite | Chrysalis |
| 1996 | Complete | Capitol |
| 2014 | Best | No Brakes Records |
| 2017 | Wooden Heart – Acoustic Anthology, Volume 2 | No Brakes Records |

=== EPs ===
| Year | Album | Label |
|---|---|---|
| 2014 | Wooden Heart – Acoustic, Volume 1 – EP | No Brakes Records |
| 2022 | Anything - EP | No Breaks Records |

=== Singles ===
| Year | Single | Peak chart positions | | | | | | | | | | Certifications | Album |
| Year | Single | UK | AUS | CAN | NZ | SWI | US | US Main | US AC | US Dance | US Country | Certifications | Album |
|---|---|---|---|---|---|---|---|---|---|---|---|---|---|
| 1982 | "Change" | — | — | — | — | — | — | 16 | — | — | — | | Ignition |
| 1982 | "Going to the Top" | — | — | — | — | — | — | — | — | — | — | | Ignition |
| 1984 | "Missing You" | 9 | 5 | 1 | 18 | 12 | 1 | 1 | 7 | 27 | — | BPI: Silver | No Brakes |
| 1984 | "Tears" | — | — | 45 | — | — | 37 | 8 | — | — | — | | No Brakes |
| 1984 | "Dark Side of the Sun" | — | — | — | — | — | — | — | — | — | — | | No Brakes |
| 1985 | "Restless Heart" | — | — | — | — | — | 59 | 28 | — | — | — | | No Brakes |
| 1985 | "Change" (re-release) | — | — | — | — | — | 54 | — | — | — | — | | Vision Quest (soundtrack) |
| 1985 | "Every Step of the Way" | 160 | — | 39 | — | — | 25 | 4 | — | — | — | | Mask of Smiles |
| 1985 | "Welcome to Paradise" | — | — | — | — | — | 85 | — | — | — | — | | Mask of Smiles |
| 1986 | "If Anybody Had a Heart" | — | — | — | — | — | 76 | 24 | — | — | — | | About Last Night... (soundtrack) |
| 1987 | "These Times Are Hard for Lovers" | 77 | 59 | — | — | — | 53 | 6 | — | — | — | | Rover's Return |
| 1987 | "Don't Lose Any Sleep" | — | — | — | — | — | 81 | — | — | — | — | | Rover's Return |
| 1990 | "Deal for Life" | 80 | — | — | — | — | — | — | — | — | — | | Days of Thunder |
| 1993 | "In Dreams" | — | — | — | — | — | 103 | — | — | — | — | | True Romance (soundtrack) |
| 1993 | "Missing You" (re-entry) | 56 | — | — | — | — | — | — | — | — | — | | The Essential John Waite |
| 1995 | "How Did I Get By Without You?" | — | — | — | — | — | 89 | — | 20 | — | — | | Temple Bar |
| 2001 | "Fly" | — | — | — | — | — | — | — | 27 | — | — | | Figure in a Landscape |
| 2005 | "New York City Girl" | — | — | — | — | — | — | — | 23 | — | — | | The Hard Way |
| 2006 | "Missing You" (with Alison Krauss) | — | — | — | — | — | — | — | — | — | 34 | | Downtown: Journey of a Heart |
| 2011 | "Shadows of Love" | — | — | — | — | — | — | — | — | — | — | | Rough & Tumble |
| 2011 | "If You Ever Get Lonely" | — | — | — | — | — | — | — | — | — | — | | Rough & Tumble |
"—" denotes releases that did not chart
