= No Brakes =

Studio album by John Waite
- Released: June 1984
- Studios: Record Plant in New York City and Record Plant in Los Angeles
- Genre: Rock
- Length: 37:49
- Label: EMI America
- Producers: John Waite; David Thoener; Gary Gersh

John Waite chronology
Ignition (1982)	No Brakes (1984)	Mask of Smiles (1985)

Professional ratings
Review scores
Source	Rating
AllMusic	4.5/5 stars

No Brakes is the second solo album by the English musician John Waite, released in 1984. It features Waite's biggest hit single "Missing You", which hit number 1 on the US Billboard's Album Rock Tracks and the Billboard Hot 100. No Brakes was certified Gold in September 1984 – three weeks prior to breaking into the top 10 of Billboard's album chart.

The album's second single, "Tears", a cover of a song originally recorded by former Kiss drummer Peter Criss for his 1982 album Let Me Rock You, charted at number 8 on Billboard's Album Rock Tracks chart and number 37 on the Billboard Hot 100.

== Track listing ==
1. "Saturday Night" (Gary Myrick, John Waite) – 2:46
2. "Missing You" (Mark Leonard, Chas Sandford, Waite) – 4:30
3. "Dark Side of the Sun" (Jean Beauvoir) – 3:57
4. "Restless Heart" (Waite) – 4:27
5. "Tears" (Vinnie Cusano, Adam Mitchell) – 3:59
6. "Euroshima" (Gary Myrick, Waite) – 5:05
7. "Dreamtime/Shake It Up" (Waite, Ivan Král) – 5:10
8. "For Your Love" (Waite, Myrick, Donnie Nossov, Curly Smith) – 3:38
9. "Love Collision" (Waite, Myrick, Nossov, Smith) – 3:51

== Personnel ==
- John Waite – all vocals
- Bruce Brody – keyboards
- Gary Myrick – guitars
- Donnie Nossov – electric bass guitar
- Curly Smith – drums
- Steve Scales – percussion

=== Production ===
- John Waite – producer
- Gary Gersh – producer
- David Thoener – producer, engineer, mixing
- John Agnello – recording assistant, mix assistant
- Eddie DeLena – recording assistant
- David Egerton – recording assistant
- Jim Scott – recording assistant
- George Marino – mastering at Sterling Sound (New York, NY)
- Henry Marquez – art direction
- Michael Hodgson – design
- David Bailey – cover photography
- Barry Linwell – photography (Gary Myrick)
- Jeffrey Scales – photography (Curly Smith)
- Geoffrey Thomas – photography (John Waite)
- Mark Weiss – photography (Donnie Nossov)
- Steven Machat and Rick Smith – direction, management

== Charts ==
=== Weekly charts ===
Weekly chart performance for No Brakes
Chart (1984)	Peak position
Australian Albums (Kent Music Report)	27
Canada Top Albums/CDs (RPM)	8
UK Albums (Official Charts)	64
US Billboard 200	10

=== Year-end charts ===
Year-end chart performance for No Brakes
Chart (1984)	Position
Canada Top Albums/CDs (RPM)	36
US Billboard 200	100

== Certifications ==
Certifications and sales for No Brakes
Region	Certification	Certified units/sales
Canada (Music Canada)	Platinum	100,000^{^}
United States (RIAA)	Gold	500,000^{^}
^{^} Shipments figures based on certification alone.
