= Havana 3am =

British band (1986–1996)

- Years active: 1986–1996
- Label: I.R.S.
- Past members: Jamie Chez; Nigel Dixon; Tom Felicetta; Gary Myrick; Paul Simonon; Travis Williams

Havana 3am was a British-American rock supergroup formed in 1986 by singer/guitarist Nigel Dixon (previously of the band Whirlwind), guitarist Gary Myrick, and bassist Paul Simonon (previously of the Clash). The band also included Travis Williams, a drummer whom they later found by a newspaper announcement. The band's name was taken from the title of a 1956 album by Pérez Prado. Havana 3am's music incorporated elements of rockabilly, Latin and reggae influences.

The band eventually signed a worldwide record deal with I.R.S. Records, then travelled to Japan to record with audio engineer Masahiko Yamazaki at a studio in Tokyo. Their self-titled album, released in 1991, received mixed reviews and contained the single "Reach the Rock", which was a minor radio hit in certain markets.

Following Dixon's death in April 1993, Simonon left the group and continued his career in visual art. Myrick, now both lead vocalist and sole guitarist, assembled a new line-up with Jamie Chez (formerly of Ta Mara and the Seen) and Tom Felicetta. The trio, calling themselves Gary Myrick & Havana 3am, released one more album in 1996, but it was less successful and they broke up shortly thereafter.

== Discography ==
- Havana 3am (1990, I.R.S. Records)
- Texas Glitter & Tombstone Tales (1996, Burnside Records)

== Members ==
- Jamie Chez – drums (1994–1996)
- Nigel Dixon – lead vocals, rhythm guitar (1986–1993)
- Tom Felicetta – bass (1994–1996)
- Gary Myrick – lead guitar, backing vocals (1986–1993), lead vocals, guitar (1994–1996)
- Paul Simonon – bass, backing vocals (1986–1993)
- Travis Williams – drums (1986–1993)
