= Charles M. Wilborn =

American sound engineer

- Occupation: Sound engineer
- Years active: 1967-2002

Charles M. Wilborn is an American sound engineer. He was nominated for an Academy Award in the category Best Sound for the film Days of Thunder. He has worked on 70 different films and TV shows from 1967 to 2002.

== Selected filmography ==
- Days of Thunder (1990)
