= William Byron =

William Byron may refer to:

- William Byron, 3rd Baron Byron (1636–1695), British peer and great-great-grandfather of poet George Gordon Byron
- William Byron, 4th Baron Byron (1669–1736), British peer and great-grandfather of poet George Gordon Byron
- William Byron, 5th Baron Byron (1722–1798), British peer and great-uncle of poet George Gordon Byron
- William D. Byron (1895–1941), Democratic member of U.S. Congress 1939–1941 from Maryland's 6th congressional district
- William Byron (racing driver) (born 1997), American race car driver
- William J. Byron (1927–2024), priest of the Society of Jesus
- Lord Byron (umpire) (1872–1955), American baseball umpire
- William Byron (MP) (1749–1776), British politician

== See also ==
- William Byron Rumford (1908–1986), California legislator
