= When You Were Mine (album) =

Studio album by John Waite
- Released: 23 September 1997
- Studio: Sear Sound, New York City; Looking Glass, New York City; A&M, Hollywood; Encore, Burbank
- Length: 50:51
- Label: Mercury; Pure Records
- Producer: John Waite

John Waite chronology
Temple Bar (1995)	When You Were Mine (1997)	Figure in a Landscape (2001)

When You Were Mine is the sixth studio album by English singer and musician John Waite, released by Mercury/Pure in 1997.

== Background ==
Speaking to Songwriting Magazine in 2013, Waite said of the album: "When You Were Mine was the best album I ever did. I kind of went country in an English way, but it's a beautiful record." He told Classic Rock Revisited that year: "When You Were Mine has strong acoustic values, and tells stories. It was completely different to what I had done before."

== Critical reception ==
Professional ratings
Review scores
Source	Rating
AllMusic	2.5/5 stars

Stephen Thomas Erlewine of AllMusic considered the album to "tone down [Waite's] hard rock influences in an attempt to regain the adult contemporary radio audience he once had". He concluded: "Although the results aren't entirely successful, there's enough well-crafted mainstream pop here to satisfy longtime fans."

== Track listing ==
No.	Title	Writer(s)	Length
1.	"When You Were Mine"	John Waite, Anthony Krizan	4:00
2.	"Imaginary Girl"	Waite, Pete Wasner	3:56
3.	"Let's Get Out of Here"	Waite, Shane Fontayne, Robert Thiele	4:19
4.	"Suicide Life"	Waite, Fontayne	6:56
5.	"Just Like a Woman"	Bob Dylan	5:37
6.	"Bluebird Cafe"	Waite, Don Lowery	3:57
7.	"I-95"	Waite, Fontayne	4:12
8.	"Show Me How to Love You"	Waite, Jeff Golub	4:55
9.	"Valentine"	Waite, Fontayne	3:45
10.	"Have You Seen Her My Friend?"	Waite, Mark Spiro	5:25
11.	"All I Want For Christmas"	Waite	3:49

== Personnel ==
- John Waite – lead and backing vocals
- Chuck Kentis – Steinway grand piano, electric piano, Hammond organ, programming (10)
- Mindy Jostyn – accordion, harmony vocals (5, 6, 11)
- Shane Fontayne – electric guitars, acoustic guitar, 6-string bass
- Jeff Golub – electric guitars, acoustic guitar, 12-string acoustic guitar
- Donnie Nossov – electric bass, acoustic bass
- Tony Beard – drums
- Tommy Funderburk – backing vocals (1, 10)
- Mark Spiro – backing vocals (1, 10)
- Liz Constantine – harmony vocals (8)

== Production ==
- John Waite – producer
- Tony Phillips – engineer, mixing
- Chad Bamford – assistant engineer
- Milton Chan – assistant engineer
- Peter Kepler – assistant engineer
- Tom Schick – assistant engineer
- Ken Villeneuve – assistant engineer
- Dave Collins – mastering
- Andrew Garver – mastering assistant
- Mick Rock – photography
