= Kevin Dukes =

American guitarist

Kevin Dukes is an American guitarist.

A native of Natchez, Mississippi, Dukes attended The University of Southern Mississippi as a Music Theory and Composition major prior to moving to Los Angeles, California in the late 1970s. He has toured and performed with Jackson Browne, Billy Joel, Don Henley, Boz Scaggs, Shania Twain, Marc Cohn, John Fogerty and Peter Cetera.

As a studio musician, Dukes has made contributions to recordings by Kelly Clarkson, Pink, Lily Allen, Dolly Parton, Don Henley, Joe Walsh, Jackson Browne, Billy Joel, Tom Petty, Juice Newton, Sara Evans, Michael Bolton and Chicago. He has appeared on numerous film and television soundtracks including Pretty In Pink, Days of Thunder, Staying Alive, Michael, Stargate, The Muppets, The Simpsons and Star Trek. Songwriting credits include recordings by Johnny Hallyday, John Farnham, Chicago, Meredith Brooks, and Don Moen for music publishers Arista, RCA, BMG and Sony Universal.

In addition to his work as a performing and recording musician Dukes has worked with musical instrument manufacturers Seymour Duncan, Yamaha, James Tyler Guitars, Roland and Line 6 on various lines of guitars, amplifiers, effects pedals, digital modeling devices and guitar sampling libraries. He currently writes, produces, and records music from his personal recording facility.
