= Days of Thunder =

1990 sports action drama film by Tony Scott

- Theatrical release poster
- Directed by: Tony Scott
- Screenplay by: Robert Towne
- Story by: Robert Towne; Tom Cruise
- Produced by: Don Simpson; Jerry Bruckheimer
- Starring: Tom Cruise; Robert Duvall; Randy Quaid; Nicole Kidman; Michael Rooker; John C. Reilly; Cary Elwes
- Cinematography: Ward Russell
- Edited by: Billy Weber; Chris Lebenzon
- Music by: Hans Zimmer
- Production company: Don Simpson/Jerry Bruckheimer Films
- Distributed by: Paramount Pictures
- Release date: June 27, 1990
- Running time: 107 minutes
- Country: United States
- Language: English
- Budget: $60 million
- Box office: $157.6 million

Days of Thunder is a 1990 American sports action drama film directed by Tony Scott and produced by Don Simpson and Jerry Bruckheimer. Robert Towne wrote the screenplay based on a story he co-wrote with Tom Cruise. The film stars Cruise, Robert Duvall, Randy Quaid, Michael Rooker, Nicole Kidman and Cary Elwes. It also features appearances by real life NASCAR racers, such as Richard Petty, Rusty Wallace, Neil Bonnett, and Harry Gant. Commentator Jerry Punch, of ESPN, has a cameo appearance, as does Simpson.

Days of Thunder was released in the United States on June 27, 1990, by Paramount Pictures. The film received mixed reviews from critics, who praised its racing sequences, Hans Zimmer's musical score, and the performances of Cruise and Duvall, but criticized its lack of originality compared to Scott's previous film Top Gun, and grossed $157.6 million worldwide against a production budget of $60 million. The film has made a large cult following to NASCAR fans over the years. A sequel is scheduled to be released on June 2, 2028.

== Plot ==
Young World of Outlaws Sprint Car Series champion Cole Trickle is recruited by Chevrolet dealership tycoon Tim Daland to race for his team in the NASCAR Winston Cup Series, bringing former crew chief and car builder Harry Hogge out of retirement to lead Cole's pit crew (Harry had left NASCAR a year prior to avoid an investigation involving the death of driver Buddy Bretherton). After Cole sets a fast time in a private test at Charlotte Motor Speedway, Harry builds him a new chassis and hires him onto his team.

Cole makes his first start at Phoenix, where he has difficulty adjusting to the larger NASCAR stock cars and communicating with his crew, while being intimidated on the track by Winston Cup Champion and dirty driver Rowdy Burns; these obstacles, combined with numerous crashes and blown engines, prevent Cole from finishing the next three races at Bristol, Dover, and Rockingham. Cole confesses to Harry that he does not understand NASCAR terminology, leading Harry to put him through rigorous training. This pays off at Darlington, when Cole uses a slingshot maneuver from the outside line to overtake Rowdy and win his first race.

The rivalry between Cole and Rowdy intensifies throughout the season until the Firecracker 400 at Daytona, where both drivers are seriously injured after being caught in a massive crash. Recovering in Daytona Beach, Cole develops a romantic relationship with Dr. Claire Lewicki, a doctor at a local hospital. NASCAR President Big John brings Rowdy and Cole together in a meeting and warns them that further misbehavior will not be tolerated. The two rivals soon become close friends after having dinner and settling their differences by smashing rental cars in a race on the beach, per Big John's persuasion.

Daland hires another hotshot rookie, Russ Wheeler, to fill Cole's seat until Cole returns, and then expands his team, with Daland now fielding two cars – the second car driven by Russ, despite Harry's disapproval. Though Cole shows signs of his old self, he falls into a new rivalry with Russ, leading to an engine failure at Atlanta. Daland offers no help to Cole or his crew, as he prefers his newest driver. At North Wilkesboro, Russ blocks Cole's path during their pit stop and later forces Cole into the outside wall on the last lap to win the race. Cole retaliates by crashing into Russ' car after the race, leading to a fight between Harry, Daland, and both of Cole and Russ's pit crews, with Daland firing both Cole and Harry in the process.

Rowdy learns he has to undergo brain surgery to fix a broken blood vessel and asks Cole to drive his car at the Daytona 500 so his sponsor will pay for the year. Cole reluctantly agrees and convinces Harry to return as his crew chief. Hours prior to the race, Harry discovers metal in the oil pan, a sign of engine failure, and manages to procure a new engine from Daland, who still believes in his former driver's promise. During the race, Cole's car is spun out by Russ and suffers a malfunctioning transmission, but the combined efforts of Harry's and Daland's pit crews manage to fix the problem and get Cole back on the lead lap. On the final lap, Russ predicts that Cole will attempt his signature slingshot maneuver from outside, but Cole tricks him with a crossover, overtaking him from the inside to win his first Daytona 500.

Cole drives into Victory Lane, where he and his pit crew celebrate with Claire. He approaches Harry, sitting alone, who is impressed by Cole's performance. Cole asks Harry to walk with him, and Harry agrees, challenging him to a foot race to Victory Lane.

== Cast ==
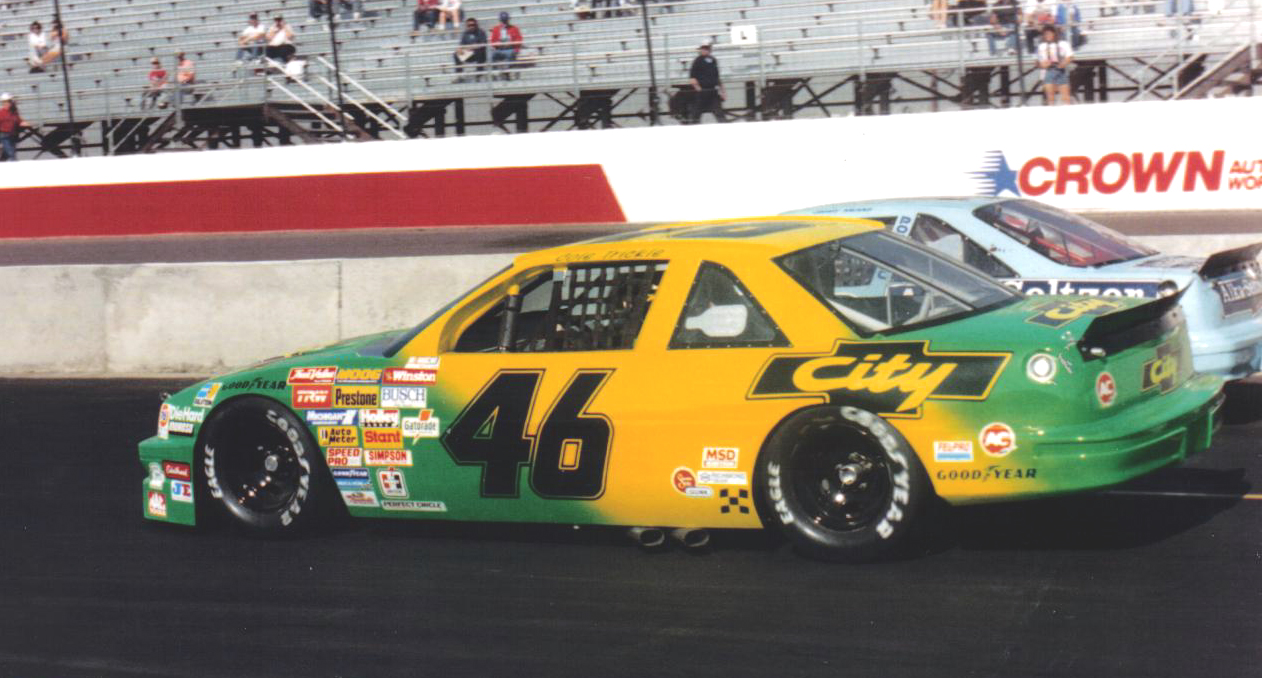
No. 46 City Chevrolet used by Cole Trickle

- Tom Cruise as Cole Trickle, a young race car driver out to make a name for himself in NASCAR. He drives the No. 46 City Chevrolet, the SuperFlo Chevrolet and later the No. 51 Mello Yello Chevrolet. The character was patterned after Tim Richmond, while his name is a nod to veteran racer Dick Trickle.
- Robert Duvall as Harry Hogge, Cole's crew chief (patterned after Harry Hyde).
- Randy Quaid as Tim Daland, a wealthy car dealership and race team owner who first recruits Cole into NASCAR (patterned after Rick Hendrick).
- Nicole Kidman as Dr. Claire Lewicki, a neurosurgeon who develops a relationship with Cole.
- Michael Rooker as Rowdy Burns, the reigning Winston Cup Champion and Cole's first rival and friend. He drives the No. 51 Exxon Chevrolet (patterned after Dale Earnhardt).
- Cary Elwes as Russ Wheeler, a rookie driver who fills in for Cole, but later on becomes his teammate and bitter rival. He drives the No. 18 Hardee's Chevrolet (patterned after Rusty Wallace).
- John C. Reilly as Buck Bretherton, Cole's car chief, and Buddy Bretherton's son.
- Fred Dalton Thompson as Big John, president of NASCAR (patterned after "Big Bill" France).
- Caroline Williams as Jennie Burns, Rowdy's wife.
- J. C. Quinn as Waddell, Rowdy's crew chief.
- Nick Searcy as a highway patrol officer.

Richard Petty, Rusty Wallace, Neil Bonnett, Harry Gant, and Dr. Jerry Punch all appear in cameo roles as themselves. Bob Jenkins had a voice-over role as a public address announcer, and his ESPN colleagues Benny Parsons and Ned Jarrett portray radio announcers.

In addition, esteemed character actress Margo Martindale is seen in her first film role, as Harry's timekeeper, while Don Simpson, one of the film's producers, has a cameo as driver Aldo Benedetti, patterned after Mario Andretti and using his twin brother Aldo Andretti's first name.

== Production ==
=== Development ===
On January 3, 1987, Tom Cruise and Paul Newman would test a NASCAR Busch Grand National Series car for Hendrick Motorsports at Daytona alongside Hendrick drivers Darrell Waltrip and Geoff Bodine. After the test, Cruise went to dinner with Rick Hendrick that night and after hearing several stories exchanged between Hendrick and others, Cruise would start pitching what would become the initial concept for Days of Thunder.

=== Filming ===
Principal photography took place in late 1989 and early 1990 in and around Charlotte and Daytona Beach. It was plagued with delays due to frequent arguments on set between Don Simpson, Jerry Bruckheimer, Tony Scott, and sometimes Robert Towne over how to set up a shot. Crew members sat idle for long hours; some later said they had accumulated enough overtime pay to go on vacation for a full four months after filming was completed. The completion date was pushed back many times, with filming being completed in early May, three months later than it had originally been scheduled. At one point, following the third revision of the shooting schedule in a single day, the unit production manager, who represents the studio on the set or location, confronted Simpson and Bruckheimer and was told bluntly that the schedule no longer mattered.

In Daytona, Simpson and Bruckheimer spent $400,000 to have a vacant storefront in their hotel converted into their private gym, with a large neon sign reading "Days of Thunder". Simpson also kept a closet full of Donna Karan dresses to offer the attractive women his assistants found on the beach, and held private parties with friends like rapper Tone Lōc. Towne also played a role in the film's increasing cost by scrapping more barn scenes when he did not like either of two barns built to his specifications. The film's original budget of $35 million nearly doubled; at that level it would have had to make at least $100 million, a rare gross at that time, to break even. In addition, when Tom Cruise lost the Oscar for Born on the Fourth of July, some additional budget was cut. Despite the budget overruns and delays, reportedly it was only after shooting was finished that the filmmakers discovered they had neglected to film Cole Trickle's car crossing the finish line at Daytona. Nine million dollars of the film's budget plus gross percentage went to star Tom Cruise.

With the delay in completion of filming and no delay in release date, post production had to be completed in five weeks rather than the five months it would normally take for such a film.

=== Race cars ===
The cars used as those of Cole Trickle, Rowdy Burns, and Russ Wheeler, being the 1989 Chevrolet Lumina Stock Car used by Dale Earnhardt during his last races, were provided by Hendrick Motorsports, with racers Greg Sacks, Tommy Ellis, Bobby Hamilton, and Hut Stricklin as the stand-in drivers. In order to provide authentic race footage involving the cars, these cars were actually raced on three occasions. In late 1989, Hamilton and Sacks raced at Phoenix. Hamilton officially qualified fifth and led a lap before his engine blew. In 1990, the cars were raced again at Daytona and Darlington. Sacks drove a car during the Busch Clash, while Hamilton and Ellis drove unscored entries in the Daytona 500. At Darlington, Stricklin and Sacks drove two of the cars, but both were pulled from the race early after Sacks broke a crankshaft. Cole's first car in the film is sponsored by City Chevrolet, a real-life car dealership in Charlotte, North Carolina, owned by Rick Hendrick.

=== Music ===
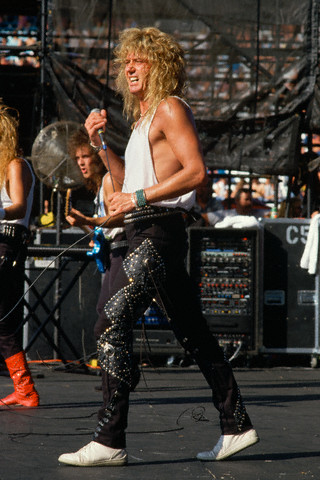
Coverdale performing with Whitesnake in 1987

The score for Days of Thunder was composed by Hans Zimmer, with Jeff Beck featured on guitar. Zimmer had this to say about Jeff Beck "I think he is the most amazing musician I've ever worked with. The whole reason I did 'Days of Thunder' was a subterfuge to work with Jeff Beck, it was as simple as that. There's Jeff Beck and then there's everybody else.". This was the first of an ongoing list of films in which Zimmer would compose the score for a Jerry Bruckheimer production. An official score album was not released until 2013, by La-La Land Records. The film's theme song "The Last Note of Freedom" was sung by David Coverdale of the band Whitesnake at the request of Tom Cruise himself. Coverdale's vocal parts were recorded in 1990 in Los Angeles during a day off of the Whitesnake Slip of the Tongue Liquor and Poker world tour. "Show Me Heaven", written and sung by Maria McKee, topped the charts in Belgium, the Netherlands, Norway, and the United Kingdom.

== Release ==
Days of Thunder was released on Wednesday, June 27, 1990, on 2,307 screens in the United States and Canada.

=== Home media ===
Having been previously released on VHS and then DVD, Days of Thunder was released as the fifth film entry in the Paramount Presents series on remastered Blu-ray in May 2020. A 4K Ultra HD Blu-ray was also released the same day. Extra features include a new Isolated Score and a six-minute featurette - Filmmaker Focus: Days of Thunder with Producer Jerry Bruckheimer.

== Reception ==
=== Box office ===
Days of Thunder took the No.1 spot for the weekend box office with $15,490,445, ultimately grossing $21.5 million in its first five days. It dropped to second place on its second week behind Die Hard 2 earning $10,707,895. The film opened on 170 screens in Japan on June 29 and grossed $2,105,932 for the weekend. Days of Thunder completed its seven weekend box office run with its final gross being $82,670,733 in North America and $157,670,733 worldwide.

=== Critical response ===
"[M]y feelings toward Days of Thunder parallel what a real fighter pilot might think about the level of drama in Top Gun: Things tend to be just a little bit different when you get a bird's eye view."

— Rusty Wallace, Associated Press review

The film received mixed reviews from critics who mostly shrugged off the sometimes over-the-top special effects and plot which greatly resembled the earlier Bruckheimer, Simpson, Scott and Cruise vehicle Top Gun, which had been hugely successful four years earlier. Halliwell's Film Guide dismissed Days of Thunder as "An over familiar story rendered no more interestingly than usual", while the Monthly Film Bulletin described it as "simply a flashy, noisy star vehicle for Tom Cruise, one which – like the stock car he drives – goes around in circles getting nowhere". It holds a rating of 38% on Rotten Tomatoes based on 68 reviews, with an average rating of 5/10. The site's consensus reads: "Days of Thunder has Tom Cruise and plenty of flash going for it, but they aren't enough to compensate for the stock plot, two-dimensional characters, and poorly written dialogue." Metacritic gave it a score of 60 out of 100 based on 16 reviews, indicating "mixed or average" reviews. Audiences polled by CinemaScore gave the film an average grade of "A" on an A+ to F scale.

After receiving an advance screening, NASCAR drivers regarded the film as entertaining yet unrealistic; Parsons explained that "if you look at it from a technical standpoint, you might have a hard time with it. If you go to be entertained, it's all right." Derrike Cope praised the acting while finding parallels between Cole's career and his own, but also criticized the characters for not acting professional. The latter sentiment was echoed by Bobby Allison, who disliked how Days of Thunder's characters validated the stereotype of NASCAR drivers being rednecks who liked to fight.

Rusty Wallace and Alan Kulwicki questioned the aggressive driving depicted in the race scenes, though Kulwicki still called it a "good story and the characters were good". Despite his initial critiques, Wallace later wrote a positive review for the Associated Press where he lauded the sport's "realistic portrayal" and deemed it "the best racing movie I've ever seen".

=== Accolades ===
The film was nominated for the Academy Award for Best Sound (Charles M. Wilborn, Donald O. Mitchell, Rick Kline and Kevin O'Connell).

=== Reassessment ===
Following Tony Scott's death in 2012, film critic Stephen Metcalf argued that the film marked an important turning point in the history of the American film industry. "The best film he made may well have been Crimson Tide," he wrote in Slate, "but the most important film he made was Days of Thunder." The excesses of its production and its failure to equal Top Gun's magnitude of box-office success, he argues, helped end the era that had followed the failure of Heaven's Gate ten years earlier. The studio's willingness to indulge director Michael Cimino on that film, as other studios had been doing up to that point, led to a backlash where studios favored producers like Simpson and Bruckheimer whose films bore far more of their imprint than any director who worked for them. Crimson Tide, made several years after Days of Thunder, was the critical and commercial success it was, Metcalf says, because after similar excesses on the producers' part like those that occurred on Thunder directors were allowed to reassert themselves.

Quentin Tarantino said the film was his favorite big budget racing movie:

Yeah, yeah, you laugh but seriously I'm a big fan. To me Days of Thunder is the movie Grand Prix and Le Mans should have been. Sure, it had a big budget, big stars and a big director in Tony Scott, but it had the fun of those early AIP movies. I just don't think it works if you take the whole thing too seriously.

In 2024, producer Jerry Bruckheimer also praised the film: "[It] was a terrific film. Tom was great in it."

== Legacy ==
While the film was neither based on a true story, nor a biographical film, the main character Cole Trickle was very loosely based on the careers of Tim Richmond and Geoff Bodine, and several scenes reenacted or referenced real-life stories and personalities from NASCAR history. The scene where Big John tells Cole and Rowdy they will drive to dinner together is based on an actual meeting Bill France Jr. had in the 1980s between Dale Earnhardt and Geoff Bodine. Richard Childress and Dale Earnhardt Jr. discussed how Days of Thunder was based on the rivalry between Earnhardt and Bodine. One scene in which Cole deliberately blows his engine by over-revving it reflects upon an incident in which Tim Richmond was said to have done at Michigan in 1987 in his final race. In another scene, Trickle is told he cannot pit because the crew is too busy eating ice cream. This incident actually occurred at the 1987 Southern 500 involving the Hendrick Motorsports No. 35 team with crew chief Harry Hyde and Richmond's replacement driver Benny Parsons. The scene where Cole and Rowdy destroy a pair of rental cars by racing them through the city streets loosely referenced early 1950s NASCAR superstars Joe Weatherly and Curtis Turner, each of whom were known to rent cars, race, and crash them with abandon.

A year after the film's release, the fictional Mello Yello sponsorship depicted on Trickle's No. 51 car was followed by a real-life sponsorship arrangement. The No. 42 Pontiac of SABCO Racing driven by Kyle Petty carried the paint scheme from 1991 to 1994. Mello Yello also sponsored the fall race at Charlotte from 1990 to 1994. At the 2013 Subway Firecracker 250, driver Kurt Busch had his unsponsored No. 1 Phoenix Racing Chevy painted to resemble Cole Trickle's No. 46 City Chevrolet car as part of an awareness campaign for the Armed Forces Foundation.

The Darlington throwback race weekend has also seen drivers race with paint schemes based on those from the film. The 2015 Bojangles' Southern 500 saw the Mello Yello car on the No. 42 Chevy of Kyle Larson. Rick Ware Racing executed the throwback in 2017 for Cody Ware's No. 51, but with a "Pray for Texas" message in support of the survivors of Hurricane Harvey. At the following year's race, RWR's No. 51 for B. J. McLeod resembled Russ Wheeler's No. 18 Hardee's car, but with Jacob Companies as the sponsor. In 2019, the City Chevrolet paint scheme returned on the No. 24 Hendrick Motorsports car of William Byron. The NASCAR Xfinity Series' 2019 Darlington race saw the No. 51 of Jeremy Clements use a paint scheme resembling Rowdy Burns' Exxon car, but with RepairableVehicles.com as the sponsor.

The 1991 Simpsons episode "Saturdays of Thunder" is named after the film.

In the film Talladega Nights: The Ballad of Ricky Bobby, Will Ferrell’s character as he screams in panic from invisible fire, yells “HELP ME TOM CRUISE!” which references Tom Cruise starring in Days of Thunder.

In 2015, M&M's released a promo video on YouTube to commemorate the 25th anniversary of Days of Thunder and to promote M&M's Crispy. The video features driver Kyle Busch and crew chief Adam Stevens parodying scenes from the film.

== Video games ==
In 1990, Mindscape released a video game adaptation of the film for multiple platforms such as the PC, NES and Amiga. A Game Boy version was released in 1992. The game was available for the PlayStation Network and iOS. Paramount Digital Entertainment released a new video game based on the film for the iOS, PlayStation 3, Xbox 360 and PlayStation Portable. iOS version was released in 2009 and other versions were released in 2011. The game includes 12 NASCAR sanctioned tracks—including Daytona International Speedway and Talladega Superspeedway—and the film characters Cole Trickle, Rowdy Burns, and Russ Wheeler. The PS3 version, labeled Days of Thunder: NASCAR Edition has more than 12 select NASCAR Sprint Cup drivers, including Denny Hamlin, Ryan Newman and Tony Stewart.

== Future ==
In November 2024, it was reported that Tom Cruise was in final talks to star in and produce a Days of Thunder sequel. It is being developed concurrently with an untitled Top Gun: Maverick sequel. In July 2026, it was reported that Jonathan Levine was in talks to direct, from a screenplay by Will Staples, and that filming was expected to begin in early 2027.

In June 2025, Joseph Kosinski told GQ Magazine that his dream pitch is a crossover between Days of Thunder and F1 with Brad Pitt. Kosinski said "Right now, it'd be Cole Trickle [Cruise's Days of Thunder character]. We find out that he and Sonny Hayes [Pitt's character in the F1 movie] have a past. They were rivals at some point, maybe crossed paths... I heard about this epic go-kart battle on Interview with the Vampire that Brad and Tom had, and who wouldn't pay to see those two go head-to-head on the track?"

In August 2026, Cruise and Anne Hathaway, who will play a racecar team owner and engineer, announced pre-production of a sequel, with Paramount Pictures announcing the release date as June 2, 2028.
