= Paul Revere & the Raiders discography =

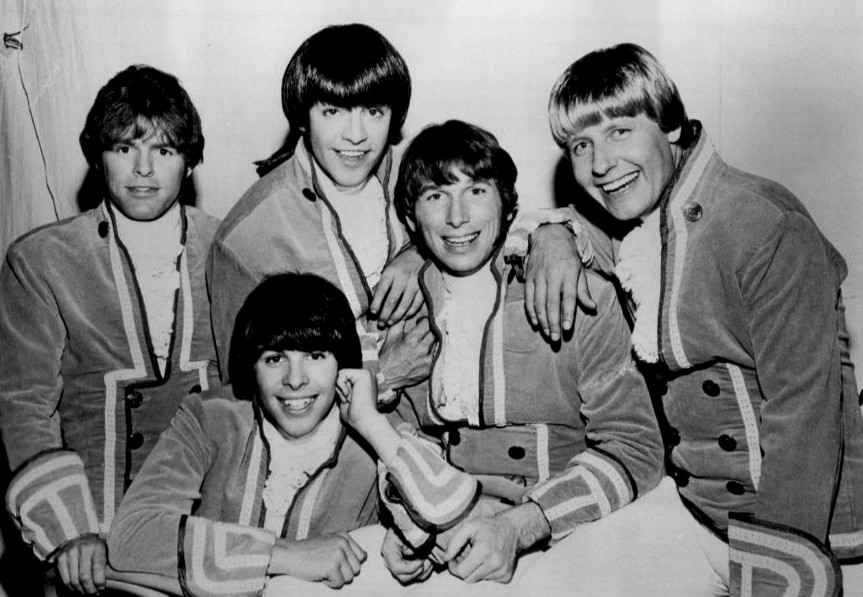
- The band in 1967.
- Studio albums: 14
- Live albums: 2
- Compilation albums: 15
- Singles: 39

Paul Revere & the Raiders are an American rock band from Boise, Idaho. Formed in 1958, the band released their first hit single three years later, "Like, Long Hair", which reached number 38 on the U.S. Billboard Hot 100 chart. Following a few minor charting singles, including a version of "Louie Louie", the band worked with producer Terry Melcher in updating their sound, combining fast-paced, guitar-and-vocal-dominated rock and roll with an intimidating R&B flavor. The result was a string of commercially successful singles, beginning with 1965's "Steppin' Out" and continuing with "Just Like Me", which reached number 11 on the Hot 100, as well as "Kicks", "Hungry", and "Good Thing", all of which peaked inside the top 10. In addition, the band's three 1966 studio albums—Just Like Us!, Midnight Ride, and The Spirit of '67—were each certified gold in the United States.

The band's popularity began to wane during the late 1960s, but in 1971 they released their first U.S. number one single, "Indian Reservation", a song written by John D. Loudermilk. However, the band did not duplicate the song's success with any subsequent singles, and by 1975 Columbia Records abandoned the group.

== Studio albums ==
Year	Album details	Peak chart positions		Certifications
Year	Album details	U.S.	CAN^{1}	Certifications
1961	Like, Long Hair: Label: Gardena (#1000)	—	—	
1963	Paul Revere & the Raiders: Released: April 1963; Label: Sandē (#1001)	—	—	
1965	Here They Come!: Label: Columbia (Mono: CL 2307, Stereo: CS 9107)	71	—	
1966	Just Like Us!: Released: January 1966; Label: Columbia (CL 2451, CS 9251)	5	—	US: Gold
1966	Midnight Ride: Released: May 9, 1966; Label: Columbia (CL 2508, CS 9308)	9	—	US: Gold
1966	The Spirit of '67: Released: November 1966; Label: Columbia (CL 2595, CS 9395)	9	—	US: Gold
1967	Revolution!: Released: August 1967; Label: Columbia (CL 2721, CS 9521)	25	—	
1967	A Christmas Present ... And Past: Released: November 1967; Label: Columbia (CL 2755, CS 9555)	71	-	
1968	Goin' to Memphis: Released: January 1968; Label: Columbia (CL 2805, CS 9605)	61	—	
1968	Something Happening: Released: August 1968; Label: Columbia (CS 9665)	122	—	
1969	Hard 'N' Heavy (with Marshmallow): Released: February 1969; Label: Columbia (CS 9753)	51	33	
1969	Alias Pink Puzz: Released: July 1969; Label: Columbia (CS 9905)	48	46	
1970	Collage: Released: March 1970; Label: Columbia (CS 9964)	154	—	
1971	Indian Reservation Released: May 1971: Label: Columbia (C 30768)	19	—	
1972	Country Wine: Released: March 1972; Label: Columbia (KC 31196)	209	—	
1982	Special Edition: Label: Raider/America (RA 682-LP)	—	—	
1983	The Great Raider Reunion: Label: ERA (NU 5880)	—	—	
1983	Paul Revere Rides Again: Label: Hitbound Records (HB-1004)	—	—	

Notes

- ^{1} Canada's RPM album chart dates back to 1968.

== Compilation albums ==
Year	Album details	Peak chart positions	Certifications
Year	Album details	U.S.	Certifications
1966	In the Beginning: Released: February 1966; Label: Jerden (JRL-7004)	—	—
1967	Greatest Hits: Released: May 1967; Label: Columbia (KCL 2662, KCS 9462)	9	US: Gold
1970	Paul Revere and the Raiders Featuring Mark Lindsay: Released: September 1970; Label: Harmony (KH 30089)	—	
1970	Greatest Hits, Vol. II: Released: December 1970; Label: Columbia (C 30386)	209	
1971	Good Thing: Released: November 1971; Label: Harmony (KH 30975)	—	
1972	Movin' On: Released: February 1972; Label: Harmony (KH 31183)	—	
1972	All-Time Greatest Hits: Released: May 1972; Label: Columbia (KG 31464); 2-LP set	143	
1984	The Best of Paul Revere and the Raiders Volume 1: Released: 1984; Label: CBS Special Products (P-17701)	—	
1990	The Legend of Paul Revere: Released: April 1990; Label: Columbia/Legacy (#45311); 2-CD set	—	
1995	The Essential Ride '63-'67: Released: June 6, 1995; Label: Columbia/Legacy (#48949)	—	
2000	Mojo Workout!: Label: Sundazed (#11097)	—	
2005	Kicks! The Anthology 1963-1972: Released: June 21, 2005; Label: Raven (#215)	—	
2008	Anthologie 1964/1971: Label: Magic (#3930796)	—	
2009	Hungry for Kicks: Singles & Choice Cuts 1965-69: Label: Rev-Ola (#284)	—	
2010	The Complete Columbia Singles: Label: Collectors Choice; 3-CD set		
2011	The Essential Paul Revere and The Raiders: Label: Columbia; 2-CD set		
"—" denotes releases that did not chart.

== Live albums ==
Year	Album details	Peak chart positions	Certifications
Year	Album details	U.S.	Certifications
1993	Generic Rock & Roll: Label: Image Designs	—	
1996	Generic Rock 2: Released: April, 1996; Label: Image Designs	—	
"—" denotes releases that did not chart.

== Singles ==
Year	Song titles (B-sides appear on same album as A-sides except where indicated)	Peak chart positions			Certifications	Album
Year	Song titles (B-sides appear on same album as A-sides except where indicated)	U.S. Billboard	U.S. Cashbox	CAN	Certifications	Album
1960	"Beatnik Sticks" b/w "Orbit (The Spy)" (Non-LP track)	—	—	—		Like, Long Hair
1960	"Unfinished Fifth" b/w "Paul Revere's Ride"	—	—	—		Non-LP tracks
1960	"Like, Long Hair" b/w "Sharon" (Non-LP track)	38	30	24		Like, Long Hair
1961	"Like Charleston" b/w "Midnite Ride"	—	—	—		Non-LP tracks
1961	"All Night Long" b/w "Groovey"	—	—	—		Like, Long Hair
1962	"Like Bluegrass" b/w "Leatherneck"	—	—	—		Non-LP tracks
1962	"Shake It Up - Part 1" b/w "Shake It Up - Part 2"	—	—	—		Non-LP tracks
1962	"Tall Cool One" b/w "Road Runner"	—	—	—		Like, Long Hair
1963	"So Fine" b/w "Blues Stay Away"	—	—	—		Paul Revere & The Raiders
1963	"Louie Louie" (Note: A "live" version of "Louie, Louie" appears on Here They Come! and Greatest Hits.) b/w "Night Train" (from Just Like Us!)	103	118	—		Greatest Hits
1964	"Louie Go Home" (Note: A re-recorded version of "Louie, Go Home" appears on Midnight Ride) b/w "Have Love, Will Travel"	118	106	—		Non-LP tracks
1964	"Over You" b/w "Swim"	133	132	—		Non-LP tracks
1964	"Ooh Poo Pah Doo" b/w "Sometime"	— 131	—	—		Here They Come!
1965	"Steppin' Out" b/w "Blue Fox" (Non-Lp track)	46	58	8		Just Like Us!
1965	"Just Like Me" b/w "B.F.D.R.F. Blues" (Non-Lp track)	11	16	28		Just Like Us!
1966	"Kicks" b/w "Shake It Up" (Non-Lp track)	4	3	1		Midnight Ride
1966	"Hungry" b/w "There She Goes" (from Midnight Ride)	6	10	3		The Spirit of '67
1966	"The Great Airplane Strike" (Note: A remix of "The Great Airplane Strike" appears on the indicated Lp and the stereo Greatest Hits Lp. The single version also appears (with earlier fade-out) on the mono Greatest Hits Lp)) b/w "In My Community"	20	17	17		The Spirit of '67
1966	"Good Thing" b/w "Undecided Man"	4	5	3		The Spirit of '67
1967	"Ups and Downs" b/w "Leslie" (from Revolution!)	22	19	15		Greatest Hits
1967	"Him or Me – What's It Gonna Be?" b/w "Legend Of Paul Revere" (from Greatest Hits)	5	9	2		Revolution!
1967	"I Had A Dream" b/w "Upon Your Leaving"	17	14	1		Revolution!
1967	"Peace Of Mind" b/w "Do Unto Others" (from The Raiders Greatest Hits, Volume II)	42; 102	35; 118	34 —		Goin' to Memphis
1967	"Rain, Sleet, Snow" b/w "Brotherly Love"; Cancelled single	—	—	—		A Christmas Present...and Past
1968	"Too Much Talk" (Note: Remixed versions appear on the indicated Lp's) b/w "Happening '68"	19	11	8		Something Happening
1968	"Don't Take It So Hard" b/w "Observation From Flight 285 (In 3/4 Time)"	27	21	11		Something Happening
1968	"Cinderella Sunshine" (Note: Re-recorded versions appear on the indicated Lp's) b/w "Theme From It's Happening" (Non-Lp track)	58	47	38		Hard 'N' Heavy (with Marshmallow)
1969	"Mr. Sun, Mr. Moon" b/w "Without You"	18	15	8		Hard 'N' Heavy (with Marshmallow)
1969	"Let Me" b/w "I Don't Know"	20	16	12		Alias Pink Puzz
1969	"We Gotta All Get Together" b/w "Frankfort Side Street" (from Alias Pink Puzz)	50	25	6		Collage
1970	"Just Seventeen" b/w "Sorceress With Blue Eyes"	82	73	58		Collage
1970	"Gone Movin' On" (re-recorded version of Lp track from Revolution!) b/w "Interlude (To Be Forgotten)"	120	92	88		Collage
1971	"Indian Reservation (The Lament of the Cherokee Reservation Indian)" b/w "Terry's Tune" (Non-Lp track)	1	1	2	US: Platinum	Indian Reservation
1971	"Birds of a Feather" b/w "The Turkey"	23	13	10		Indian Reservation
1972	"Country Wine" b/w "It's So Hard Getting Up Today" (Non-Lp track)	51	28	36		Country Wine
1972	"Powder Blue Mercedes Queen" b/w "Golden Girls Sometimes"	54	43	31		Country Wine
1972	"Song Seller" b/w "A Simple Song"	96	89	75		Non-Lp tracks
1973	"Love Music" b/w "Goodbye No. 9"	97	61	89		Non-Lp tracks
1974	"All Over You" b/w "Seaboard Line Boogie"	—	—	—		Non-Lp tracks
1975	"Your Love (Is The Only Love)" b/w "Gonna Have A Good Time"	—	123	—		Non-Lp tracks
1976	"Ain't Nothin' Wrong" b/w "You're Really Saying Something"	—	—	—		Non-Lp tracks
"—" denotes releases that did not chart in that country.
