= The Essential Paul Revere and the Raiders =

Greatest hits album by Paul Revere & the Raiders
- Released: March 15, 2011
- Recorded: 1964, 1966–1967
- Length: 1:40:29
- Labels: Sony Music Japan (Japan); Columbia (US); Legacy
- Producer: Bob Irwin

Paul Revere & the Raiders chronology
The Complete Columbia Singles (2010)	The Essential Paul Revere and the Raiders (2011)	Flower Power (2011)

The Essential Paul Revere and the Raiders is a 2CD compilation album by the American rock band Paul Revere & the Raiders, released on Legacy Recordings, with Sony Music Japan in Japan, and with Columbia Records in the United States.

== Critical reception ==
Professional ratings
Review scores
Source	Rating
AllMusic	4/5 stars
PopMatters	8/10

In a 4 of 5 star review for AllMusic, Stephen Thomas Erlewine notes that "The Essential Paul Revere & the Raiders is a generous double-disc, 36-track collection that is nevertheless slightly shorter than the comparable 1990 collection The Legend of Paul Revere", adding that "For those who only want big hits -- or only want the group’s earliest rock & roll -- this is too much, but for those who like to dig deeper, this Essential proves that Paul Revere & the Raiders had plenty of pop treasures buried in their catalog."

PopMatters writer Stephen Haag states in an 8 out of 10 review for the album that "This generous two-disc set, with 36 tracks in all, does a fine job updating 2005’s Kicks: The Anthology as Essential boasts 11 tracks not found on Kicks, while the latter has only four not on the former (notably the Boyce/Hart-penned “I’m Not Your Stepping Stone”).", he praised the audio quality, saying that "the songs themselves sound great, offered in their original mono or stereo", adding that "Disc 1 chronicles the band’s fast rise, capturing all the aforementioned classic singles and reminds listeners how truly kick-ass these guys in goofy get-ups could be", while "Disc 2 finds the band cycling through members and identities in Richard Nixon’s America. While the Raiders may not have been cracking the charts between ’68 and ’72 with the regularity they once had, they were still producing quality tunes." concluding in his review by noting that "An ignominious end, but as they say, the music lasts forever, and the 36 tracks collected here make a strong case for the continued historical relevance of one of the best bands of the 1960s."

In a short paragraph in an interview with Paul Revere & the Raiders' lead singer Mark Lindsay, Jim Caligiuri of the Austin Chronicle summarized the compilation to be a "two-disc overview of the band that explains their place in rock & roll history" Not long after Revere's death in 2014, the Second Disc republished their review of the compilation alongside Country Wine..Plus that was originally published on March 11, 2011.

== Track listing ==
Disc one
No.	Title	Length
1.	"Louie Louie" (Richard Berry cover, single version)	2:42
2.	"Over You" (Aaron Neville cover, in mono)	2:13
3.	"My Wife Can't Cook"	2:27
4.	"Steppin' Out"	2:31
5.	"Just Like Me"	2:33
6.	"Ride Your Pony" (Lee Dorsey cover)	2:46
7.	"Kicks"	2:27
8.	"Shake It Up"	4:05
9.	"Louie, Go Home"	2:40
10.	"Hungry"	2:56
11.	"The Great Airplane Strike" (mono)	2:58
12.	"Louise"	2:07
13.	"Good Thing"	3:04
14.	"Ups and Downs" (mono)	2:49
15.	"Him or Me – What's It Gonna Be?"	2:51
16.	"Mo'reen"	2:31
17.	"I Had a Dream"	2:21
18.	"Goin' to Memphis"	2:44

Disc two
No.	Title	Length
1.	"Do Unto Others" (mono)	2:13
2.	"Peace of Mind" (single version)	2:27
3.	"Too Much Talk" (mono)	2:15
4.	"Happening '68" (TV version, mono)	1:35
5.	"Don't Take It So Hard"	2:24
6.	"Cinderella Sunshine" (single version)	2:00
7.	"Mr. Sun, Mr. Moon"	2:47
8.	"Let Me!"	3:57
9.	"Freeborn Man"	3:33
10.	"Judge GTO Breakaway" (mono)	2:45
11.	"We Gotta All Get Outta This Place" (single version)	2:58
12.	"Just Seventeen"	3:50
13.	"Gone Movin' On"	2:39
14.	"Indian Reservation (The Lament of the Cherokee Reservation Indian)" (Don Fardon cover)	2:54
15.	"Birds of a Feather" (Joe South cover)	2:41
16.	"Country Wine"	2:30
17.	"Powder Blue Mercedes Queen"	3:05
18.	"Song Seller"	3:33
Total length:		1:40:29
