= Greatest Hits (Paul Revere & the Raiders album) =

Greatest hits album by Paul Revere & the Raiders
- Released: May 1967
- Genre: Pop rock; rock; garage rock
- Length: 29:19
- Label: Columbia
- Producer: Terry Melcher

Paul Revere & the Raiders chronology
The Spirit of '67 (1966)	Greatest Hits (1967)	Revolution! (1967)

Greatest Hits is a greatest hits album by the American rock band Paul Revere & the Raiders, released in May 1967 by Columbia Records. It contains a lot of the band's charting singles up until that point, which include "Hungry", "Kicks" and ""Good Thing".

== Release and reception ==
Professional ratings
Review scores
Source	Rating
AllMusic	4.5/5 stars
The Encyclopedia of Popular Music	3/5 stars
MusicHound Rock	4.5/5 stars

The writers of Cashbox note that "The hitbound sound of the group is in evidence everywhere on the LP, and the offering should soon make its presence felt on the charts." Record World states that the band "have cut some pretty sizzling tunes in their years together and the best of them are here." In an AllMusic review, William Ruhlmann writes that "the album traced the band from its beginnings as a Northwest club band to its reign as an L.A. pop/rock success." The album was reissued in 1987 on its original release label Columbia Records, and again in 2000, with the 2000 release having four extra tracks than the original release..

== Track listing ==
Side one
No.	Title	Writer(s)	Original release	Length
1.	"Louie, Louie"	Richard Berry	Here They Come! (1965)	2:47
2.	"Louie, Go Home"	Paul Revere; Mark Lindsay	Non-album single (1964)	2:39
3.	"Steppin' Out"	Revere; Lindsay	Just Like Us! (1966)	2:12
4.	"Just Like Me"	Rick Dey; Rich Brown	Just Like Us	2:33
5.	"Melody For An Unknown Girl"	Revere; Lindsay	Midnight Ride (1966)	2:04
6.	"Kicks"	Cynthia Weil; Barry Mann	Midnight Ride	2:26

Side two
No.	Title	Writer(s)	Original release	Length
1.	"Hungry"	Weil; Mann	The Spirit of '67 (1966)	2:57
2.	"The Great Airplane Strike"	Revere; Terry Melcher; Lindsay	The Spirit of '67	2:53
3.	"Good Thing"	Lindsay; Melcher	The Spirit of '67	3:01
4.	"Ups and Downs"	Lindsay; Melcher	New song	2:51
5.	"Legend of Paul Revere"	Lindsay; Melcher	New song	3:06
Total length:				29:19

2000 CD reissue bonus tracks
No.	Title	Writer(s)	Original release	Length
1.	"Action"	Steve Venet; Tommy Boyce	Just Like Us!	1:28
2.	"(I'm Not Your) Steppin' Stone"	Boyce; Bobby Hart	Midnight Ride	2:46
3.	"Him or Me – What's It Gonna Be?"	Lindsay; Melcher	Revolution! (1967)	2:51
4.	"Peace of Mind"	Lindsay; Melcher	Goin' to Memphis (1968)	2:26

== Charts ==
Chart performance for Greatest Hits
Chart (1967)	Peak position
US Billboard Top LPs	9

== Certifications and sales ==
Region	Certification	Certified units/sales
United States (RIAA)	Gold	500,000^{^}
^{^} Shipments figures based on certification alone.
