= Paul Revere (musician) =

American musician (1938–2014)

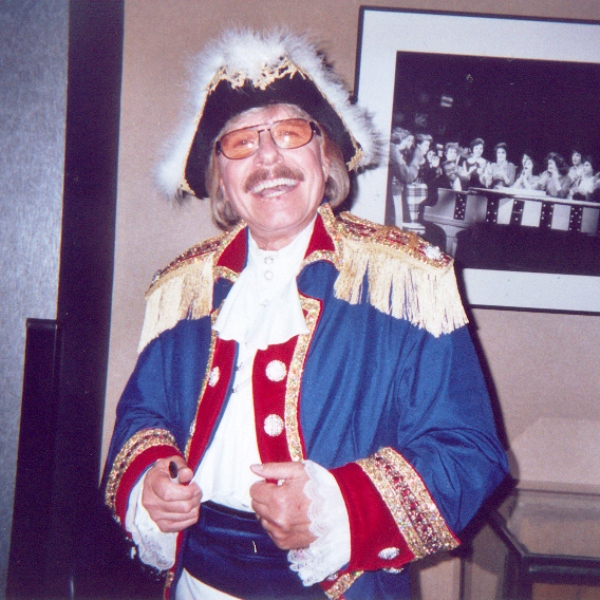
- Revere in 2007

Background information
- Born: Paul Revere Dick; January 7, 1938; Harvard, Nebraska, U.S.
- Died: October 4, 2014 (aged 76) Garden Valley, Idaho, U.S.
- Occupation: Musician
- Instrument: Keyboards
- Years active: 1958–2014
- Formerly of: Paul Revere & the Raiders
- Website: www.paulrevereraiders.com

Paul Revere Dick (January 7, 1938 – October 4, 2014) was an American musician, best known for being the leader, keyboardist and (by dropping his last name to create the stage name) namesake of Paul Revere & the Raiders.

The band became notable for a string of hits (they claim 23 straight) from the early 1960s to the early 1970s and thrust Revere into the position of a celebrity.

== Career ==
=== Paul Revere & the Raiders ===
Born in Harvard, Nebraska, Dick was the "idea man" behind the group. Even before the group, he was convinced there was a place for a combination of music and humor after seeing Spike Jones & His City Slickers. After taking piano lessons, he emulated the style of Jerry Lee Lewis. Dick grew up on a farm near Boise, Idaho, and graduated from Caldwell High School. After attending barbers' college, he had opened a barber's shop and a drive-in restaurant in Caldwell; while picking up hamburger buns from a local bakery he met teenaged Mark Lindsay, and the two became the foundation of the band in 1959.

Originally known as the Downbeats, when the band started recording, record company executives disliked the name; they took a new name as an embellishment from Dick's given names and the reputation of folk hero Paul Revere. He had the band dress in Revolutionary War uniforms, giving the band a distinctive look.

"We were visual and fun and crazy and were America's answer to the British music invasion. ... We just happened to be at the right time and had the right name and had the right gimmick."

Revere was the energetic comic relief, the madman of rock and roll, in contrast to the teen idol look of Lindsay. He pushed for elements of showmanship including having the band's guitarist, originally Drake Levin, and bassist, originally Phil Volk, perform synchronized dance moves. Paul Revere himself would play organs and keyboards that all had various facades attached that looked like the front of different hot rod cars and motorcycles. He would also engage in flashy and comical spoken word banter between songs, sometimes including bandmates and even fans. He also used various comical props during the show, like oversized hats, records, stuffed animals and a toy cap gun.

Revere announced his retirement from the music business at the end of 1976, and split up the Raiders. Paul's retirement would be short, as he was back with a new cast of the Raiders by 1978.

=== Where The Action Is ===
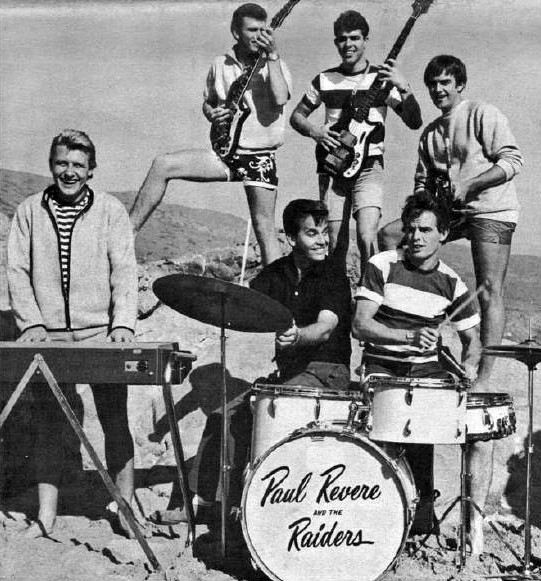
The Raiders on Dick Clark’s Where The Action Is in 1966 (Paul on left)

Starting in 1965, the band became the house band for the Dick Clark ABC weekday afternoon variety show Where the Action Is, the first active, charting band to take on such status.

=== Happening ‘68 ===
After the show was canceled in 1967, the band continued its house band position on the ABC Saturday afternoon shows Happening '68, and later It's Happening. Lead singer Mark Lindsay and Revere became the hosts of the shows while the rest of the band added slapstick comedy to the show.

== Death ==
Revere continued with the band until mid-2014, when cancer forced his retirement. He left his son Jamie to continue the band's legacy. He died in Garden Valley, Idaho, on October 4, 2014, at age 76. He is interred at Morris Hill Cemetery in Boise, Idaho.

On October 10, 2014, at the Los Angeles Forum, Tom Petty performed "I'm Not Your Steppin' Stone", dedicating it to Paul Revere, acknowledging his death that week.

== Discography ==
=== Studio albums ===
| Year | Album details |
|---|---|
| 1961 | Like, Long Hair |
| 1963 | Paul Revere & the Raiders |
| 1965 | Here They Come! |
| 1966 | Just Like Us! |
| 1966 | Midnight Ride |
| 1966 | The Spirit of '67 |
| 1967 | Revolution! |
| 1967 | A Christmas Present ... And Past |
| 1968 | Goin' to Memphis |
| 1968 | Something Happening |
| 1969 | Hard 'N' Heavy (with Marshmallow) |
| 1969 | Alias Pink Puzz |
| 1970 | Collage |
| 1971 | Indian Reservation |
| 1972 | Country Wine |
| 1983 | Special Edition |
| 1983 | The Great Raider Reunion |
| 1983 | Paul Revere Rides Again |

=== Live albums ===
| Year | Album details |
|---|---|
| 1993 | Generic Rock & Roll |
| 1996 | Generic Rock 2 |

=== Singles ===
| Year | Song titles |
|---|---|
| 1960 | "Beatnik Sticks" b/w "Orbit (The Spy)" (Non-LP track) |
| 1961 | "Paul Revere's Ride" b/w "Unfinished Fifth" |
| 1961 | "Like, Long Hair" b/w "Sharon" (Non-LP track) |
| 1961 | "Like Charleston" b/w "Midnite Ride" |
| 1961 | "All Night Long" b/w "Groovey" |
| 1962 | "Like Bluegrass" b/w "Leatherneck" |
| 1962 | "Shake It Up - Part 1" b/w "Shake It Up - Part 2" |
| 1962 | "Tall Cool One" b/w "Road Runner" |
| 1963 | "So Fine" b/w "Blues Stay Away" |
| 1963 | "Louie Louie" b/w "Night Train" (from Just Like Us!) |
| 1964 | "Louie Go Home" b/w "Have Love, Will Travel" |
| 1964 | "Over You" b/w "Swim" |
| 1964 | "Ooh Poo Pah Doo" b/w "Sometimes" |
| 1965 | "Steppin' Out" b/w "Blue Fox" (Non-Lp track) |
| 1965 | "Just Like Me" b/w "B.F.D.R.F. Blues" (Non-Lp track) |
| 1966 | "Kicks" b/w "Shake It Up" (Non-Lp track) |
| 1966 | "Hungry" b/w "There She Goes" (from Midnight Ride) |
| 1966 | "The Great Airplane Strike" b/w "In My Community" |
| 1966 | "Good Thing" b/w "Undecided Man" |
| 1967 | "Ups and Downs" b/w "Leslie" (from Revolution!) |
| 1967 | "Him or Me – What's It Gonna Be?" b/w "Legend Of Paul Revere" (from Greatest Hits) |
| 1967 | "I Had A Dream" b/w "Upon Your Leaving" |
| 1967 | "Peace Of Mind" / "Do Unto Others" |
| 1967 | "Rain, Sleet, Snow" b/w "Brotherly Love" Cancelled single |
| 1968 | "Too Much Talk" b/w "Happening '68" |
| 1968 | "Don't Take It So Hard" b/w "Observation From Flight 285 (In 3/4 Time)" |
| 1968 | "Cinderella Sunshine" b/w "Theme From It's Happening" (Non-Lp track) |
| 1969 | "Mr. Sun, Mr. Moon" b/w "Without You" |
| 1969 | "Let Me" b/w "I Don't Know" |
| 1969 | "We Gotta All Get Together" b/w "Frankfort Side Street" (from Alias Pink Puzz) |
| 1970 | "Just Seventeen" b/w "Sorceress With Blue Eyes" |
| 1970 | "Gone Movin' On" (re-recorded version of Lp track from Revolution!) b/w "Interlude (To Be Forgotten)" |
| 1971 | "Indian Reservation (The Lament of the Cherokee Reservation Indian)" b/w "Terry's Tune" (Non-Lp track) |
| 1971 | "Birds of a Feather" b/w "The Turkey" |
| 1972 | "Country Wine" b/w "It's So Hard Getting Up Today" (Non-Lp track) |
| 1972 | "Powder Blue Mercedes Queen" b/w "Golden Girls Sometimes" |
| 1972 | "Song Seller" b/w "A Simple Song" |
| 1973 | "Love Music" b/w "Goodbye No. 9" |
| 1974 | "All Over You" b/w "Seaboard Line Boogie" |
| 1975 | "Your Love (Is The Only Love)" b/w "Gonna Have A Good Time" |
| 1976 | "Ain't Nothin' Wrong"/ b/w "You're Really Saying Something" |

== See also ==
- Happening ‘68
