= Collage (Paul Revere and the Raiders album) =

Studio album by Paul Revere and the Raiders
- Released: March 1970
- Label: Columbia
- Producer: Mark Lindsay

Paul Revere and the Raiders chronology
Alias Pink Puzz (1969)	Collage (1970)	Indian Reservation (1971)

Professional ratings
Review scores
Source	Rating
AllMusic	3/5 stars

Collage is the twelfth studio album by Paul Revere and the Raiders (listed as "Raiders" on the sleeve), released in 1970.

== Background ==
In an effort to update the band's sound and image, the name of the group was officially shortened to The Raiders on this and their subsequent albums Indian Reservation (1971) and Country Wine (1972). The album received a glowing review from Rolling Stone magazine critic Lenny Kaye, who singled out singer Mark Lindsay for praise: "[He] never fails to give the impression that he knows what he's doing. Almost single-handedly, he's brought the Raiders to a stronger position than they've occupied in years". Despite the review, Collage proved to be a commercial failure (#154 on the Billboard 200) and Lindsay began to turn toward solo projects.

Two singles were released from Collage: "Just Seventeen" and "Gone Movin' On", which was a re-recorded version of a track from the group's 1967 album Revolution!. A faster tempo earlier version of "We Gotta All Get Together", written by guitarist Freddy Weller, peaked at No. 6 in Canada and No. 25 in the United States when distributed as an A-side on August 12, 1969. Neither "Just Seventeen" or "Gone Movin' On" cracked the Top 40.

== Track listing ==
=== Side 1 ===
1. "Save The Country" (Laura Nyro)
2. "Think Twice" (Mark Lindsay, Keith Allison)
3. "Interlude (To Be Forgotten)" (Lindsay, Allison)
4. "Dr. Fine" (Lindsay)
5. "Just Seventeen" (Lindsay)

=== Side 2 ===
1. "The Boys In The Band" (Lindsay)
2. "Tighter" (Lindsay, Terry Melcher)
3. "Gone Movin' On" (Lindsay, Melcher)
4. "Wednesday's Child" (Lindsay, K. Allison, J. Allison)
5. "Sorceress With Blue Eyes" (Lindsay, Allison)
6. "We Gotta All Get Together" (Freddy Weller) (Extended 1970 Version)

== Personnel ==
- Mark Lindsay – lead vocals, producer
- Paul Revere – keyboards, vocals
- Freddy Weller - guitar, vocals
- Keith Allison - bass, guitar, piano, organ, vocals
- Joe Correro Jr. – drums, congas, vocals

== Charts ==
Weekly chart performance for Collage
Chart (1970–1971)	Peak position
US Top LPs (Billboard)	154
