= Keith Allison =

American musician

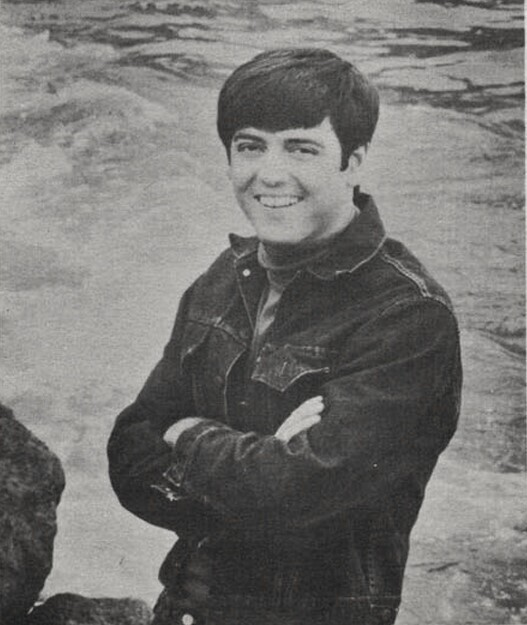
- Allison in 1965

Background information
- Born: Sydney Keith Allison; August 26, 1942; Coleman, Texas, U.S.
- Died: November 17, 2021 (aged 79) Sherman Oaks, Los Angeles, California, U.S.
- Genre: Rock
- Occupations: Musician, Actor
- Instruments: Guitar, bass, vocals
- Years active: 1960s-2021
- Formerly of: Paul Revere & the Raiders

Sydney Keith Allison (August 26, 1942 - November 17, 2021) was an American musician and composer, best known as a member of Paul Revere & the Raiders from 1968 to 1975.

== Music ==
Allison began working as a professional solo artist and session musician in the early 1960s. Allison played guitar and harmonica on Sonny & Cher's song “The Beat Goes On”. A year later, Columbia Records signed Keith and released his debut album Keith Allison In Action.

=== Where The Action Is ===
He would gain notoriety in 1965, when he became a regular act on the Los Angeles-based show, Where the Action Is. Reportedly, Allison became a regular on the show due to his resemblance to Paul McCartney after being spotted on cameras as a member of the audience on the first episode of the show:

They said they needed people in seats, so one of the dancers grabbed me. She pulled me in a seat and grabbed my little leather cap and put it on her head, and I clapped along with the music. They took a couple of camera shots and got a landslide of mail wanting to know who the kid was!

=== Paul Revere & the Raiders ===
In 1968, Allison joined Paul Revere & the Raiders as their bassist. Keith played on their albums Something Happening (1968), Hard ‘N’ Heavy (1969), Alias Pink Puzz (1969), Collage (1970), Indian Reservation (which included the song "Indian Reservation (The Lament of the Cherokee Reservation Indian)", which would become the group's first number one charting song) (1971), and Country Wine (1972). Around the time Allison joined the Raiders, the group's sole original members, Mark Lindsay and Paul Revere, had recently started hosting the show Happening '68. Allison and the additional members of the Raiders would become the house band for the show until its cancellation in 1969.

Allison left the Raiders in 1975.

=== Composing ===
Allison scored the 1972 film Where Does It Hurt?, and wrote and sang the title song. Allison recorded the song “Sail Away” with Harry Nilsson. He worked with Ringo Starr on his 1978 album Bad Boy, also serving as the musical director for his TV special, Ringo, the same year. Also in 1978, he composed music for the film Sgt. Pepper's Lonely Hearts Club Band, starring The Bee Gees, and had a small cameo in the film.

Keith performed on songs recorded by various artists, including The Monkees, Sonny & Cher, Harry Nilsson, and Ringo Starr. Keith also recorded and performed with Roy Orbison, The Beach Boys, The Righteous Brothers, Chuck Berry, Alice Cooper, Ricky Nelson, The Crickets and Johnny Rivers.

== Acting ==
Keith played minor roles in numerous shows and films, starting with the role of Hinkley in Where Does It Hurt? (1972). In most of the roles he played, he also did work in the composing of the music in the film. Allison played Captain James J. White in the 2003 film Gods and Generals.

Keith played a croupier in a 1978 episode of The Love Boat. He played the character Ray in two episodes of 7th Heaven and Pete Weston in Blossom and played the pirate Buck in the 1999 film Treasure At Pirate's Point. Allison played the groom in the final scene of the 2022 film Cuddly Toys, which was released after his death.

== Personal life ==
Allison was born in Coleman, Texas and raised in San Antonio. His cousin was Jerry Allison, drummer for The Crickets. Keith was married to a woman named Tina for more than 40 years. When he was in a relationship with Judith D. Allison, they had a son, Ryeland (born 1967), who is also a music producer. Keith had seven grandchildren including Adrian Gonzales, who achieved minor success in both tennis and competitive swimming.

Allison was a member of The Hollywood Vampires, an elite celebrity Drinking club founded by Alice Cooper in the 1970s, where you were made a member by outdrinking the members of the club. Members included: John Belushi, Marc Bolan, Jack Cruz, Micky Dolenz, Keith Emerson, Mal Evans, John Lennon, Keith Moon, Harry Nilsson, Ringo Starr, Bernie Taupin, and Klaus Voormann.

== Death ==
Allison died on November 17, 2021, in Sherman Oaks, Los Angeles at the age of 79. Celebrities such as Ringo Starr and Micky Dolenz shared their condolences on social media. The official social media account for Paul Revere & the Raiders would post:

We all here in the Raider family are terribly heartbroken. Keith will always be a Raider. Our love goes out to Keith’s wife Tina, son Ryeland, daughters Allison and Brenda, and all the grandchildren. Keith was a friend to all, and everyone loved Keith. His presence will be strongly missed.

== Discography ==
=== Solo ===
Title	Year
Keith Allison In Action	1967

=== With Paul Revere & the Raiders ===
==== Studio albums ====
Year	Album details
1968	Something Happening
1969	Hard 'N' Heavy (with Marshmallow)
1969	Alias Pink Puzz
1970	Collage
1971	Indian Reservation
1972	Country Wine

==== Singles ====
Year	Song Titles
1968	"Too Much Talk" b/w "Happening '68"
1968	"Don't Take It So Hard" b/w "Observation From Flight 285 (In 3/4 Time)"
1968	"Cinderella Sunshine" b/w "Theme From It's Happening" (Non-Lp track)
1969	"Mr. Sun, Mr. Moon" b/w "Without You"
1969	"Let Me" b/w "I Don't Know"
1969	"We Gotta All Get Together" b/w "Frankfort Side Street" (from Alias Pink Puzz)
1970	"Just Seventeen" b/w "Sorceress With Blue Eyes"
1970	"Gone Movin' On" (re-recorded version of Lp track from Revolution!) b/w "Interlude (To Be Forgotten)"
1971	"Indian Reservation (The Lament of the Cherokee Reservation Indian)" b/w "Terry's Tune" (Non-Lp track)
1971	"Birds of a Feather" b/w "The Turkey"
1972	"Country Wine" b/w "It's So Hard Getting Up Today" (Non-Lp track)
1972	"Powder Blue Mercedes Queen" b/w "Golden Girls Sometimes"
1972	"Song Seller" b/w "A Simple Song"
1973	"Love Music" b/w "Goodbye No. 9"
1974	"All Over You" b/w "Seaboard Line Boogie"
1975	"Your Love (Is The Only Love)" b/w "Gonna Have A Good Time"
1976	"Ain't Nothin' Wrong"/ b/w "You're Really Saying Something"

== Filmography ==
- It's Happening (1968) (composer)
- Head (1968) (music department)
- Where Does It Hurt? (1972) (composer and role of Hinkley)
- Phantom of the Paradise (1974) (role of Country and Western singer)
- Sextette (1977) (role of waiter)
- Ringo (1978) (music department)
- Sgt. Pepper's Lonely Hearts Club Band (1978) (role of Guest)
- The Love Boat (1978) (role of croupier; one episode)
- The Night the Lights Went Out in Georgia (1981) (music consultant and role of Musician)
- Blossom (1993) (role of Pete Weston; two episodes)
- Left Luggage (1998) (composer)
- A Rock and a Hard Place (1998) (composer)
- Treasure of Pirate's Point (1999) (role of Buck)
- Fly Boy (1999) (role of Store Manager)
- 7th Heaven (1998-2001) (role of Ray; two episodes)
- Don't Let Go (2002) (composer)
- 30 Days Until I'm Famous (2004) (music technical advisor)
- Cuddly Toys (2022) (role of Groom; posthumous release)
