= Once Upon a Time in Hollywood (soundtrack) =

2019 soundtrack album

Once Upon a Time in Hollywood (Original Motion Picture Soundtrack)

Soundtrack album by Various Artists
- Released: July 27, 2019
- Genres: Rock and roll; pop
- Length: 74:19
- Labels: Columbia; Sony
- Producer: L. Driver Productions Inc.

Professional ratings
Review scores
Source	Rating
AllMusic	4/5 stars
Pitchfork	7.7/10

Once Upon a Time in Hollywood (Original Motion Picture Soundtrack) is the soundtrack album to Quentin Tarantino's 2019 motion picture Once Upon a Time in Hollywood. The film also contains numerous songs and scores not included on the soundtrack.

== Background ==
Tarantino and his music supervisor, Mary Ramos listened to 14 hours of original 1969 KHJ-AM soundchecks to help create the soundtrack. It includes original Boss Radio jingles by Johnny Mann and commercials, as well as the voices of Boss Radio DJs including Don Steele and Charlie Tuna, also featured in the film. Ramos and Tarantino selected the songs in his home by going through his vinyl collection. They were approached by some name acts to record covers and by Lana Del Rey to record original material but Tarantino insisted he only wanted to use music recorded before 1970.

Tarantino stated he was influenced by the soundtrack for American Graffiti. He said he "went nuts for [it]" and "It had Wolfman Jack DJ stuff filtered through. That was probably my first soundtrack album." When it came to using Neil Diamond's "Brother Love's Travelling Salvation Show" Tarantino stated, "Brother Love sounds a bit like Charles Manson" and "I have a connection to Neil that goes back to the Urge Overkill song [Diamond's "Girl, You'll Be a Woman Soon"] in Pulp Fiction." "I think this might be [my] best [soundtrack] yet."

Mark Lindsay, lead singer of Paul Revere & the Raiders, whose music is featured in the film, once lived at 10050 Cielo Drive, the address of the Tate murders. He wrote the song "Good Thing" which appears on the soundtrack, at the residence. The Mamas & the Papas song "Straight Shooter" appears in the film and its trailer. The sheet music for the song was found on the piano inside Sharon Tate's residence during the investigation of her murder. Members of the group Cass Elliot and Michelle Phillips are portrayed in the movie.

"The Green Door" is sung in the film by Leonardo DiCaprio as Rick Dalton on Hullabaloo. The song was cited as a reference to a portal to hell by a late 1960s Charles Manson-like cult leader, David Berg in letters regarding his group "The Family". Another Hullabaloo scene was shot featuring DiCaprio singing "Don't Fence Me In" by Cole Porter and Robert Fletcher but it was not included in the final cut of the film.

Tarantino stated he had an idea for the film that he abandoned which would help to illustrate how the movie was a fairy tale. He thought of using songs from the fictional band, The Carrie Nations from the film Beyond the Valley of the Dolls, as though they were real. Tarantino went on to say that Beyond the Valley of the Dolls is connected to the Manson Family through both the character "Z-Man and with Phil Spector, for many reasons." He would have included them on KHJ. The Playboy Mansion scene was originally scored to Bobby Jameson's song "Vietnam" from Mondo Hollywood, before being changed to "Son of a Lovin' Man." Tarantino also said he really wanted to use the song "California Girl (And the Tennessee Square)" by Tompall & the Glaser Brothers in the film but was unable to.

== Reception ==
=== Critical response ===
Jonah Bromwich of Pitchfork said the music was "a highlight" and an "oft-disquieting mixtape of golden-age rock n' roll, radio DJ patter, and period-specific commercials." Ben Allen of Radio Times commented, "Tarantino knows exactly how effective music can be in enhancing key scenes in his films. This is evident throughout Once Upon a Time in Hollywood." Michael Roffman of Consequence opined, "The collection is chock full of 60's selections that look strange on paper, but work effortlessly together on screen." Stephen Thomas Erlewine of AllMusic wrote, "Listening to Once Upon a Time brings that world to life. It's like switching the AM radio on to a 1960s that never faded away." It was nominated for the best compilation soundtrack album for visual media at the 62nd Annual Grammy Awards.

=== Analysis ===
Jon Drawbaugh analyzed the way in which Once Upon a Time in Hollywood used its music thematically. He noted that Paul Revere & the Raiders' "Hungry" is used when Manson shows up to look for Terry Melcher at the Tate/Polanski residence where Melcher once lived with one of the band's members, whom Melcher produced. Drawbaugh also pointed out how the use of "Out of Time" by the Rolling Stones coincides as "the story is coming to its finale," and "darkness is falling upon Hollywood." He referred to Joan Didion's The White Album and how it illustrated how the Tate murders marked a transition from idealism and "the free spirit hippie vibe" into something "darker and more sinister." Drawbaugh said even the use of the ads was used in step with the film. When Helena Rubinstein's Heaven Sent ad is heard during a scene in which Cliff Booth talks to "Pussycat," the line "A little bit naughty, but heavenly" is heard, which Drawbaugh saw as a hint to what Booth thought about her. Drawbaugh also stated that the use of the ads was to provide an immersive radio experience, as Tarantino had done with K-Billy (Steven Wright) in Reservoir Dogs.

Justin Martell noted that the Mamas & the Papas' "Twelve Thirty (Young Girls Are Coming to the Canyon)" evokes "Manson-vibes" and is used as "Manson Family members [are] creeping up Cielo Drive [in Benedict Canyon] in their 1959 Ford." Martell states that this is a "perfect use of this song." Jason Gorber of /Film wrote how Simon & Garfunkel's Mrs. Robinson is used to foreshadow "an illicit connection soon to come" by evoking another film, Mike Nichols' 1967 The Graduate, which it was originally written for. "The song plays as Cliff [Booth] (Brad Pitt) spots the (much younger) Pussycat (Margaret Qualley)," using its connection with The Graduate, in which Mrs. Robinson (Anne Bancroft) seduces the much younger Benjamin Braddock (Dustin Hoffman).

Ethan Warren analyzed in detail the film's use of the radio ad for Jack Smight's The Illustrated Man, which appears on the soundtrack. It appears at the beginning of Once Upon a Time... in Hollywood and Warren writes that it is used to foreshadow the rest of the film. The Illustrated Man, like Tarantino's film examines the fear of younger generations by older ones. Warren notes the two films are also about three connected stories. Where The Illustrated Man and its stories are overshadowed by the title character, Once Upon a Time's shadow is Charles Manson (Damon Herriman). When the radio ad says "Don't dare stare," Warren sees that as a comment about Manson. Warren states that Manson has become America's ideal bogeyman. He believes Tarantino takes that away in his film by not only erasing his legacy but also by not making him a threat on Spahn Ranch or in the film's finale. And so, Warren concludes that a "price is to be paid for being intrigued by a villain," and just as we should not stare at the Illustrated Man, neither should we "stare" at Manson. Warren also comments on the story "The Veldt" from The Illustrated Man and how it is about children who turn into killers based on the media they consume, and "Sadie"'s (Mikey Madison) justification in Once Upon a Time that because Rick Dalton pretends to kill people on TV he has taught her and others to kill, and so deserves to be murdered himself.

Author Ron Wilson wrote about the use of the "Lillie Langtry Theme" from John Huston's The Life and Times of Judge Roy Bean. The song starts playing at the end of Once Upon a Time when "the camera cranes above the gates as we watch Rick being greeted by Sharon." Roy Bean is a fantasy and myth of the Old West. It is about a time of transition in the West and was made at a time when Hollywood was transitioning away from Westerns, as Wilson sees Tarantino correlating with Once Upon a Time and it being about Hollywood transitioning away from Westerns and into a new era. Wilson says both films romanticize innocence and are shrines to a world that never existed. He states they are both symbolized by actresses. In the case of Roy Bean, by Lillie Langtry (Ava Gardner) and in the case of Once Upon a Time, Sharon Tate (Margot Robbie). Kim Newman pointed out how both films share a fantasy revenge element as well. In Roy Bean the title character (Paul Newman) lives much longer than the historical Roy Bean and exacts revenge against the oil companies that changed America and the Old West.

== Track listing ==
Once Upon a Time in Hollywood
No.	Title	Writer(s)	Artist(s)	Length
1.	"Treat Her Right"	Roy Head and Gene Kurtz	Roy Head and the Traits	2:04
2.	"Ramblin' Gamblin' Man"	Bob Seger	Bob Seger System	2:22
3.	"Hush"	Joe South	Deep Purple	4:08
4.	"Mug Root Beer advertisement"	Johnny Mann	Humble Harve Miller	0:08
5.	"Hector"	Johnny Gonzales and Joe Espinoza	The Village Callers	2:31
6.	"Son of a Lovin' Man"	Terry Cashman, Gene Pistilli, and Tommy West	Buchanan Brothers	2:56
7.	"Paxton Quigley's Had the Course"	Chad Stewart and Jeremy Clyde	Chad & Jeremy	3:17
8.	"Tanya Hawaii Corporation Tanning Butter Advertisement"	Pepper Tanner (jingle)/courtesy of Bristol-Myers	Robert W. Morgan (DJ)/Marcene Harris (song)	1:06
9.	"Good Thing"	Mark Lindsay and Terry Melcher	Paul Revere & the Raiders	3:02
10.	"Hungry"	Barry Mann and Cynthia Weil	Paul Revere & the Raiders	2:53
11.	"Choo Choo Train"	Donnie Fritts and Eddie Hinton	The Box Tops	2:50
12.	"Jenny Take a Ride"	Bob Crewe, Little Richard, Johnny Moore, Enotris Johnson, Ma Rainey, and Lena Arent	Mitch Ryder & the Detroit Wheels	3:36
13.	"Kentucky Woman"	Neil Diamond	Deep Purple	4:44
14.	"The Circle Game"	Joni Mitchell	Buffy Sainte-Marie	3:00
15.	"Mrs. Robinson"	Paul Simon	Simon & Garfunkel	3:36
16.	"Clairol Cologne For Men Numero Uno: The Searchers (Advertisement)"	Produced by Bill Hudson of Foote, Cone & Belding/Carthusia I Profumi di Capri (company)		0:49
17.	"Bring a Little Lovin'"	Harry Vanda and George Young	Los Bravos	2:17
18.	"Heaven Sent by Helena Rubinstein Advertisement featuring Suddenly"	Harold E. Weed (song)/courtesy of Dana Classic Fragrances	Kathy Keegan (song)	0:59
19.	"Vagabond High School Reunion"		Don Steele	0:20
20.	"KHJ Los Angeles Weather Report"		Don Steele	0:10
21.	"The Illustrated Man Advertisement featuring Ready For Action"	Syd Dale (Ready For Action)	Syd Dale (Ready For Action)	0:29
22.	"Hey Little Girl"	Bobby Stevenson and Otis Blackwell	Dee Clark	2:15
23.	"Clairol Summer Blonde Advertisement featuring Come to the Sunshine"	Shirley Polykoff of Foote, Cone & Belding courtesy of Coty Inc./Van Dyke Parks (song)	Harpers Bizarre (song)/Rosemary Rice (female voice on ad)/Don Steele (DJ)	1:15
24.	"Brother Love's Traveling Salvation Show"	Neil Diamond	Neil Diamond	3:27
25.	"Don't Chase Me Around (from the film Gas-s-s-s)"	Barry Melton	Robert Corff	1:45
26.	"Mr. Sun, Mr. Moon"	Mark Lindsay	(feat. Mark Lindsay) Paul Revere & the Raiders	2:45
27.	"California Dreamin'"	John Phillips and Michelle Phillips	José Feliciano	4:09
28.	"Dinamite Jim (English version)"	Nico Fidenco, G. Cassia	I Cantori Moderni di Alessandroni	2:27
29.	"You Keep Me Hangin' On (Tarantino edit)"	Holland–Dozier–Holland	Vanilla Fudge	5:00
30.	"Miss Lily Langtry (from The Life and Times of Judge Roy Bean)"	Maurice Jarre	Maurice Jarre	3:13
31.	"KHJ Batman Promotion"	Neal Hefti (Batman Theme song)	The Ron Hicklin Singers (song)/Adam West as Batman and Burt Ward as Dick Grayson's Robin (voices)	1:06
Total length:				74:19

== Charts ==
Chart (2019)	Peak position	Reference
Australia (ARIA Charts)	14	
Austria (Ö3 Austria Top 40)	18	
Flanders, Belgium (Ultratop Flanders)	17	
Wallonia, Belgium (Ultratop Wallonia)	98	
Czech Republic (ČNS IFPI)	35	
France (SNEP)	49	
Germany (Offizielle Top 100)	18	
Hungary (MAHASZ)	35	
Netherlands (Dutch Album Top 100)	68	
Poland (ZPAV)	13	
Spain (PROMUSICAE)	15	
Switzerland (Schweizer Hitparade)	16	

== Additional music ==
Other music from the film
No.	Title	Writer(s)	Artist(s)	Length
1.	"The Letter"	Wayne Carson	Joe Cocker with Leon Russell and The Shelter People
2.	"Summertime"	George Gershwin, DuBose Heyward, Ira Gershwin, and Dorothy Heyward	Billy Stewart
3.	"Victorville Blues (from The Hard Ride)"	Harley Hatcher	The Harley Hatcher Combo (Harley Hatcher and Davie Allan)
4.	"Funky Fanfare"	Keith Mansfield	Keith Mansfield
5.	"The House That Jack Built"	Bobby Lance and Fran Robbins	Aretha Franklin
6.	"Time for Livin'"	The Addrisi Brothers	The Association
7.	"I Can't Turn You Loose"	Otis Redding	Wayne Cochran and The C.C. Riders
8.	"Soul Serenade"	King Curtis and Luther Dixon	Willie Mitchell
9.	"Out of Time"	Mick Jagger and Keith Richards	the Rolling Stones
10.	"Twelve Thirty (Young Girls Are Coming to the Canyon)"	John Phillips	The Mamas & the Papas
11.	"Snoopy vs. the Red Baron"	Phil Gernhard and Dick Holler	The Royal Guardsmen
12.	"MacArthur Park"	Jimmy Webb	Robert Goulet on The Hollywood Palace
13.	"I'll Never Say Never To Always"	Charles Manson	Margaret Qualley, Sydney Sweeney, Madisen Beaty, Kansas Bowling, Harley Quinn Smith, and Ruby Rose Skotchdopole as Manson girls
14.	"Straight Shooter"	John Phillips	The Mamas & the Papas
15.	"Straight Shooter"	John Phillips	Samantha Robinson as Abigail Folger
16.	"The Green Door"	Hutch Davie and Marvin J. Moore	Leonardo DiCaprio as Rick Dalton
17.	"The Killing (from Torn Curtain)"	Bernard Herrmann	Elmer Bernstein and the Royal Philharmonic Orchestra
18.	"The Radiogram (from Torn Curtain)"	Bernard Herrmann	Elmer Bernstein and the Royal Philharmonic Orchestra
19.	"The Rocks (from Have Gun – Will Travel)"	Bernard Herrmann	Bernard Herrmann
20.	"The Return (from Have Gun – Will Travel)"	Bernard Herrmann	Bernard Herrmann
21.	"Theme from Hell River"	Vojislav Borisavljević
22.	"Theme from Against a Crooked Sky"	Lex de Azevedo	Richard Hazard
23.	"Theme from A Man Called Apocalypse Joe"	Bruno Nicolai	Bruno Nicolai
24.	"Theme from Mannix"	Lalo Schifrin	Lalo Schifrin (conductor) and Mannix musicians
25.	"The Bed" (from Danger: Diabolik)"	Ennio Morricone	Bruno Nicolai
26.	"Ecce Homo (from Sartana Does Not Forgive)"	Francesco De Masi	Francesco De Masi
27.	"Mexican Western (from Any Gun Can Play)"	Francesco De Masi	Francesco De Masi
28.	"Cooler (from The Great Escape)"	Elmer Bernstein	Elmer Bernstein
29.	"Freya Bangs (from The Wrecking Crew)"	Hugo Montenegro	Hugo Montenegro
30.	"Freya (from The Wrecking Crew)"	Hugo Montenegro	Hugo Montenegro
31.	"Karate Dance (from The Wrecking Crew)"	Hugo Montenegro	Hugo Montenegro
32.	"TV Screen (from The Wrecking Crew)"	Hugo Montenegro	Hugo Montenegro
33.	"Theme from It's Happening"	Mark Lindsay	Paul Revere & the Raiders
34.	"Dalton Gang Ride Entrance (from Cattle Annie and Little Britches)"	Sanh Berti and Tom Slocum	Tom Slocum, John Bird, and the Cattle Annie Band
35.	"The F.B.I. Theme and Score Cues"	Bronisław Kaper	Dominic Frontiere
36.	"Kicks"	Cynthia Weil and Barry Mann	Paul Revere & the Raiders
37.	"Screen Gems logo theme (1965 version)"	Van Alexander	Eric Siday
38.	"93 KHJ jingle"	Johnny Mann	The Johnny Mann Singers featuring Thurl Ravenscroft and Vicki Lawrence
39.	"NBC chimes"	Phillips Carlin	Ernest LaPrade and O.B. Hanson

== Novel ==
A novelization of the film written by Tarantino was published in 2021. It contained printed lyrics of five songs not heard in the film with the permission of Hal Leonard LLC.

Printed lyrics from the novel
No.	Title	Writer(s)	Length
1.	"Little Green Apples"	Bobby Russell
2.	"Lookin' out My Back Door"	John Fogerty
3.	"Secret Agent Man"	P. F. Sloan and Steve Barri
4.	"The Teddy Bear Song"	Don Earl and Nick Nixon
5.	"There But For Fortune"	Phil Ochs

== Limited-edition single ==
The Collectors Edition Blu-Ray and 4K release of the film issued in December 2019 included a limited-edition blue vinyl 45 (Columbia 38-25444). Although packaged in a mock sleeve for Rick Dalton's version of "Green Door", the single itself contained "Bring a Little Lovin'" by Los Bravos and the Paul Revere & the Raiders recording of "Good Thing," which are also on the soundtrack album.
