= Hard 'N' Heavy (with Marshmallow) =

Studio album by Paul Revere and the Raiders
- Released: February 1969
- Genre: Psychedelic pop, bubblegum pop
- Label: Columbia, Sundazed
- Producer: Mark Lindsay

Paul Revere and the Raiders chronology
Something Happening (1968)	Hard 'N' Heavy (with Marshmallow) (1969)	Alias Pink Puzz (1969)

Professional ratings
Review scores
Source	Rating
AllMusic	3/5 stars

Hard 'N' Heavy (with Marshmallow) is the tenth studio album by Paul Revere and the Raiders, released in 1969. It entered the Billboard 200 on 5 April 1969 at number 122, spending 19 weeks on the chart peaking at number 51 on 10 May 1969. The sound of the album has been compared to the Rolling Stones with both garage rock and light psychedelia sounds.

This album (with the Indian Reservation album) was remastered from the original analogue tapes by Michael J. Dutton and reissued in 2019 by Dutton Vocalion in hybrid multi-channel SACD format.

== Singles ==
"Mr. Sun, Mr. Moon" was released as a single and spent 12 weeks on the Billboard Hot 100 peaking at number 18. The track was later included in the Once Upon a Time…in Hollywood soundtrack.

== Track listing ==
All songs written by Mark Lindsay (except where noted).

=== Side 1 ===
1. "Mr. Sun, Mr. Moon"
2. "Money Can't Buy Me"
3. "Time After Time" (Allison, Lindsay)
4. "Ride On My Shoulder"
5. "Without You" (Allison, Lindsay)
6. "Trishalana"

=== Side 2 ===
1. "Out On That Road" (Allison, Lindsay)
2. "Hard And Heavy 5 String Soul Banjo" (Weller)
3. "Where You Goin' Girl" (Weller)
4. "Cinderella Sunshine"
5. "Call On Me"

=== Bonus Tracks (2000 Sundazed CD Reissue) ===
1. "Do Unto Others" (single version)
2. "Cinderella Sunshine" (single version)
3. "Theme From It's Happening"
4. "Judge GTO Breakaway"

== Personnel ==
- Mark Lindsay – lead vocals, producer
- Paul Revere – keyboards, vocals
- Freddy Weller - guitar, vocals
- Keith Allison - bass, guitar, piano, organ, vocals
- Joe Correro Jr. – drums, congas, vocals
