= Leatherneck (disambiguation) =

Leatherneck is a military slang term for a member of the United States Marine Corps.

Leatherneck may also refer to:

== In military uses ==
- Leatherneck Magazine, a magazine for current and former members of the U.S. Marine Corps
- Camp Leatherneck, a U.S. Marine Corps base in Afghanistan
- The Leatherneck, the post newspaper of the Marine Corps Institute
- Lou Diamond (1890–1951), USMC Master Gunnery Sergeant, nicknamed "Mr. Leatherneck"

== In entertainment and media ==
=== Fictional characters ===
- Leatherneck (G.I. Joe), a fictional character from the G.I. Joe universe

=== Film ===
(Chronological)

- The Leatherneck, a 1929 film nominated for an Academy Award for Best Writing (Adapted Screenplay)
- Leathernecking, a 1930 film by Edward F. Cline
- Flying Leathernecks, a 1951 film by Nicholas Ray
- Leathernecks, the English title of the 1989 Italian film Colli di cuoio

=== Games ===
- Leatherneck, 1988 game for Amiga and Atari ST computers by MicroDeal
- Leatherneck, an expansion module for Battle Hymn, the Japanese-theatre version of the wargame Ambush!
- Leathernecks are a Cult-affiliated enemy in the 2018 retro-styled FPS DUSK

=== Music ===
- "Leatherneck", a song by Every Time I Die from The Big Dirty
- "Leatherneck", a song by Paul Revere & the Raiders

== In sports ==
- Western Illinois Leathernecks, the sports teams of Western Illinois University
