= The Spirit of '67 =

The Spirit of '67 may refer to:

- The Spirit of '67 (Oliver Nelson and Pee Wee Russell album), 1967
- The Spirit of '67 (Paul Revere & the Raiders album), 1966
- Spirit of '67, an album by Vanilla Fudge, 2015
