= Indian Reservation (album) =

Studio album by Paul Revere and the Raiders
- Released: May 1971
- Label: Columbia
- Producer: Mark Lindsay

Paul Revere and the Raiders chronology
Collage (1970)	Indian Reservation (1971)	Country Wine (1972)

Professional ratings
Review scores
Source	Rating
AllMusic	3/5 stars

Indian Reservation is the thirteenth studio album by Paul Revere and the Raiders (listed as "The Raiders" on the sleeve), released in 1971.

== Background ==
The album is best known for the title track, which reached No. 1 in the U.S. on July 24, becoming the first and only number-one hit of (Paul Revere &) the Raiders. In Canada, the song peaked at No. 2 for four weeks. The single spent a total of 22 weeks on the Billboard Hot 100 chart.

== Production ==
The album contains nine cover songs and one original, "The Turkey", written by Mark Lindsay, with backing by his own band, Instant Joy.

Columbia also released a quadrophonic version of the album (CQ 30678).

This album (with the Hard 'N' Heavy (with Marshmallow) album) was remastered from the original analogue tapes by Michael J. Dutton and reissued in 2019 by Dutton Vocalion in hybrid multi-channel SACD format.

== Track listing ==
=== Side 1 ===
1. "Indian Reservation (The Lament of the Cherokee Reservation Indian)" (John D. Loudermilk)
2. "The Shape of Things to Come" (Barry Mann, Cynthia Weil)
3. "Prince of Peace" (Leon Russell, Greg Dempsey)
4. "Heaven Help Us All" (Ron Miller)
5. "Take Me Home" (Terry Melcher)

=== Side 2 ===
1. "Just Remember You're My Sunshine" (Mike Settle)
2. "Come In, You'll Get Pneumonia" (Harry Vanda, George Young, Tony Cahill)
3. "Eve of Destruction" (P. F. Sloan)
4. "Birds of a Feather" (Joe South)
5. "The Turkey" (Mark Lindsay)
