= The Illustrated Man (film) =

1969 film by Jack Smight

- Theatrical release poster
- Directed by: Jack Smight
- Screenplay by: Howard B. Kreitsek
- Based on: The Illustrated Man; 1951 stories by Ray Bradbury
- Produced by: Ted Mann; Howard B. Kreitsek
- Starring: Rod Steiger; Claire Bloom
- Cinematography: Philip H. Lathrop
- Edited by: Archie Marshek
- Music by: Jerry Goldsmith
- Distributed by: Warner Bros.-Seven Arts
- Release date: March 26, 1969
- Running time: 103 minutes
- Country: United States
- Language: English

The Illustrated Man is a 1969 American dark science fiction drama film directed by Jack Smight and starring Rod Steiger as a man whose tattoos on his body represent visions of frightening futures. The film is based on three short stories from the 1951 collection The Illustrated Man by Ray Bradbury: "The Veldt," "The Long Rain," and "The Last Night of the World."

== Plot ==
Set in the backroads of America, the film enacts three of Bradbury's short stories set in the future, with a man named Carl telling tales behind some of his tattoos, which he insists are not to be called tattoos, but only ever "skin illustrations", which come to life and tell the illustration's story when stared at directly. The stories are about virtual reality ("The Veldt"), a mysterious planet ("The Long Rain") and the end of the world ("The Last Night of the World"). Carl, accompanied by his dog, Peke, tells his tales to Willie, a traveler. The tie-in prologue tells of how Carl came to be tattooed after he encountered a mysterious woman named Felicia in a remote farmhouse. The plot comes to a conclusion when Willie looks at the only blank patch of skin on Carl's body and sees an image of his own murder at Carl's hands. Willie attempts to kill Carl and then flees into the night, pursued by a still-living Carl, with the audience left undetermined as to Willie's fate.

=== Story summaries ===
- "The Veldt" - Parents in a futuristic society worry about their children's mental health when their new virtual reality nursery, which can produce any environment the children imagine, continually projects an African veldt populated by lions feasting on carcasses. A child psychologist suggests that the automated house is not good for the children's development, and insists they disable the automation and become more self-sufficient. The children are not pleased with this decision, but later coolly agree to it. The children trap their parents in the nursery, where they become prey to the lions. They later have lunch on the veldt with the child psychologist, who sees the lions feasting. Unlike the original story, the psychologist realises what has happened and is horrified.
- "The Long Rain" - A group of astronauts are stranded on Venus, where it rains continually and heavily. The travelers make their way across the Venusian landscape to find a "sun dome", a shelter with a large artificial light source. The first sun dome they find has been destroyed by the native Venusians. Searching for another sun dome, the characters, one by one, are driven to madness and suicide by the unrelenting rhythm of the rain. Unlike the original story, this is a whole group of astronauts and a single sane astronaut remains to find a functional sun dome.
- "The Last Night of the World" - Every adult on Earth has had the same vision of the Earth ending that night. A husband tells his wife that the ruling council has decided that there is nothing else to do except await the inevitable, and not to tell any children of this (to spare them). The couple and their children go through their normal routines, knowing and accepting the fact that there is no tomorrow. Unlike the original story, the ruling council has decided that all children will be put to death painlessly to spare them "the end" by being given a poison pill before going to bed, but the couple awaken the next morning to find the Earth did not end and are horrified that they have needlessly killed their children.

== Cast ==
- Rod Steiger as Carl
- Claire Bloom as Felicia
- Robert Drivas as Willie
- Don Dubbins as Pickard
- Jason Evers as Simmons
- Tim Weldon as John
- Christine Matchett as Anna

== Production ==
The Illustrated Man comprises three science fiction short stories from Ray Bradbury's collection of short stories The Illustrated Man. Howard B. Kreitsek wrote the screenplay that encompassed the stories "The Veldt," "The Long Rain," and "The Last Night of the World"; Jack Smight directed the film. Bradbury was not consulted for the adaptation. Since the collection included eighteen short stories, Smight chose three stories and used the carnival sideshow freak who appeared in the collection's prologue and epilogue as the film's primary narrative. As the tattooed man, the director cast Rod Steiger, whom he had known since the 1950s.

== Reception ==
The Illustrated Man was considered a critical and financial failure. Time wrote, "Responsibility for the failure of The Illustrated Man must rest with Director Jack Smight. He has committed every possible error of style and taste, including the inexcusable fault of letting Steiger chew up every piece of scenery in sight."

Vincent Canby of The New York Times wrote, "Mr. Kreitsek's screenplay is unsharp, without focus, working into and out of the hallucinations with great awkwardness." Canby found the film to have "moments of eerie beauty" but believed that the director was limited by the screenplay. The critic said, "Everything remains foetus-like and underdeveloped, although shrouded in misty pretensions of grandeur." Roger Ebert of the Chicago Sun-Times wrote, "Smight's confused, wandering film never does quite come to terms with what it wants to be." Ebert pointed out the film's weaknesses to be acting and character but did not find them to be fatal. He believed that the film's major flaw was "inadequate attention" to the audience's expectations, distracting it with logic and lack of logic in the film's three stories. He concluded, "And so the film finally doesn't work for the same reason that comic Westerns usually fail: Because it's risky to fool around with a genre unless you know what you're doing."

Ray Bradbury said: "Rod was very good in it, but it wasn't a good film ... the script was terrible."

According to John Stanley, "a major disappointment, for producer Howard B. Kreitsek's script fails to capture the poetry or imagination of Ray Bradbury's famous collection. Jack Smight is too conventional a director to give this the technique it screams out for."

The film was nominated for the 1970 "Best Dramatic Presentation" Hugo Award, but did not win.

When The Illustrated Man was released on DVD in 2006, a retrospective review of the film wrote that the counterculture of the 1960s was evident in the film and that its depiction of the future did not age well.

The 2019 Quentin Tarantino film Once Upon a Time in Hollywood features a radio advertisement of The Illustrated Man, as well as appearing on the film's soundtrack.

== Remake ==
In August 2007, Zack Snyder signed on to direct a remake of The Illustrated Man with Watchmen co-screenwriter Alex Tse as screenwriter. In 2009 Tse said the script was in six parts, and included the stories "The Illustrated Man", "The Veldt", and "The Concrete Mixer". As of 2024, the remake has not appeared.

== See also ==
- List of American films of 1969
