= And the Grass Won't Pay No Mind =

Song by Neil Diamond

Single by Neil Diamond

from the album Brother Love's Travelling Salvation Show
- B-side: "Merry-Go-Round"
- Released: 1970 (Australia)
- Genre: Easy Listening, Pop
- Length: 3:33
- Label: MCA
- Songwriter: Neil Diamond
- Producers: Tom Catalano, Neil Diamond

Neil Diamond singles chronology
"Until It's Time for You to Go" (1970)	"And the Grass Won't Pay No Mind" (1970)	"Solitary Man" (1970)

"And the Grass Won't Pay No Mind"

Single by Mark Lindsay

from the album Silver Bird
- B-side: "Funny How Little Men Care"
- Released: September 1970 (U.S.)
- Genre: Easy Listening, Pop
- Length: 3:32
- Label: Columbia
- Songwriter: Neil Diamond
- Producer: Jerry Fuller

Mark Lindsay singles chronology
"Silver Bird" (1970)	"And the Grass Won't Pay No Mind" (1970)	"Problem Child" (1971)

"And the Grass Won't Pay No Mind" is a song written by Neil Diamond and recorded in 1969 on his Brother Love's Travelling Salvation Show LP. It was also featured on his live LP Hot August Night. Diamond's original became a minor hit in Australia before the song became a U.S. and Canadian hit for Mark Lindsay in the fall of 1970.

== Mark Lindsay version ==
Mark Lindsay, of Paul Revere and the Raiders fame, recorded "And the Grass Won't Pay No Mind" on his 1970 Silverbird LP. It reached No. 44 on the U.S. Billboard Hot 100 and No. 34 in Canada. It was a bigger Easy Listening hit, reaching the Top 20 in both nations (U.S. No. 5).

== Chart history ==
Neil Diamond

Chart (1970)	Peak position
Australia (Kent Music Report)	92

Mark Lindsay

Chart (1970)	Peak position
Canada RPM Adult Contemporary	14
Canada RPM Top Singles	34
U.S. Billboard Hot 100	44
U.S. Billboard Adult Contemporary	5
U.S. Cash Box Top 100	37

== Other versions ==
- "And the Grass Won't Pay No Mind" was recorded by Elvis Presley on February 17, 1969. It was included on his 1969 LP Back in Memphis, and a posthumously remixed version featuring the Royal Philharmonic Orchestra was released on the 2015 album If I Can Dream.
- Billy J. Kramer released it as a non-album single for European issue in 1971.
