= Revolution! =

Studio album by Paul Revere & the Raiders
- Released: August 7, 1967
- Recorded: 1967
- Genre: Psychedelic pop; garage rock
- Label: Columbia
- Producer: Terry Melcher

Paul Revere & the Raiders chronology
Greatest Hits (1967)	Revolution! (1967)	Goin' to Memphis (1968)

Revolution! is the seventh studio album by American rock band Paul Revere & the Raiders, on Columbia Records (CS 9521). Produced by Terry Melcher and released in 1967, it reached number 25 on the U.S. albums chart and yielded two top 40 singles. The album cover photo was taken on the porch of a house located at the corner of East 15th Street and Mississippi Avenue in Joplin, Missouri.

This album was remastered and rereleased by Sundazed Music on November 19, 1996, with bonus tracks.

== Personnel changes ==
Revolution! is a transitional album for the band, which underwent a substantial line-up change prior to its release. The rhythm section of Jim Valley, Phil Volk, and Michael Smith all departed and were replaced, respectively, by Freddy Weller, Charlie Coe, and Joe Correro, Jr.

== Critical reception ==
Professional ratings
Review scores
Source	Rating
AllMusic	4/5 stars

In a 1967 review, Billboard called the album a "driving package" that should continue the band's "successful chart string." The tracks "Him or Me – What's It Gonna Be?", "I Had a Dream", "Mo'reen", "Tighter" and "Gone - Movin' On" were named album highlights. AllMusic's Jack Rabid wrote: "If not as consistently a knockout as Spirit of '67, Revolution! is nevertheless right on its heels, containing as it does an even greater degree of pop experimentation within the form." Rabid described singer and songwriter Mark Lindsay as a "minor marvel" and "the glue that holds what would have been a willy-nilly collection together."

== Original track listing ==
All songs written by Mark Lindsay and Terry Melcher.

=== Side 1 ===
1. "Him or Me – What's It Gonna Be?" — 2:50
2. "Reno" — 2:24
3. "Upon Your Leaving" — 3:12
4. "Mo'reen" — 2:30
5. "Wanting You" — 2:52
6. "Gone - Movin' On" — 2:34

=== Side 2 ===
1. "I Had a Dream" — 2:20
2. "Tighter" — 1:59
3. "Make It with Me" — 3:07
4. "Ain't Nobody Who Can Do It Like Leslie Can" — 2:19
5. "I Hear a Voice" — 2:49

== Sundazed Music 1996 version ==
1. "Him or Me – What's It Gonna Be?" — 2:50
2. "Reno" — 2:24
3. "Upon Your Leaving" — 3:12
4. "Mo'reen" — 2:30
5. "Wanting You" — 2:52
6. "Gone - Movin' On" — 2:34
7. "I Had a Dream" (Isaac Hayes, Lindsay, Melcher, David Porter) — 2:20
8. "Tighter" — 1:59
9. "Make It With Me" — 3:07
10. "Ain't Nobody Who Can Do It Like Leslie Can" — 2:19
11. "I Hear a Voice" — 2:49
12. "Ups and Downs" — 2:49 (Bonus track)
13. "Try Some of Mine" — 2:45 (Bonus track)
14. "Legend of Paul Revere" — 3:49 (Bonus track)

== Personnel ==
- Guitars: Keith Allison, James Burton, Glen Campbell, Jerry Cole, Ry Cooder, Mike Deasy,
  Joel Scott Hill, Drake Levin, Taj Mahal, Jim Valley, Freddy Weller
- Bass: Charlie Coe, Chris Ethridge, Joe Osborn, Ray Pohlman, Phil Volk
- Keyboards: Ron Collins, Larry Knechtel, *Paul Revere – keyboards, vocals
- Drums: Hal Blaine, Joe Correro, Jim Gordon, Jim Keltner, Mike "Smitty" Smith
- Percussion – Mark Lindsay, Charles Shoemaker, Ed Thigpen
- Saxophone: Jim Horn, John Kelson, Mark Lindsay, Jay Migliori, Plas Johnson, Tom Scott
- Harmonica – Terry Hoffman
- Horns: Lou Blackburn, Roy Caton, Jules Chaikin, Lew McCreary, Ollie Mitchell
- Strings: Margaret Aue, Israel Baker, Jimmy Bond, David Burke, Nathan Kaproff, George Kast,
  Jan Kelley, Lou Klass, Raphael Kramer, William Kurasch, Emmet Sargeant, Ralph Schaeffer,
  Albert Steinberg, Joseph Stepansky

== Chart performance ==
Revolution! peaked at number 25 on the Billboard 200 albums chart.

Chart (1967)	Peak position
U.S. Billboard 200	25
