= Silver Bird (Mark Lindsay song) =

Single by Mark Lindsay

from the album Silver Bird
- B-side: "So Hard to Leave You"
- Released: May 21, 1970
- Genre: Pop
- Length: 3:05
- Label: Columbia
- Songwriter: Kenny Young
- Producer: Jerry Fuller

Mark Lindsay singles chronology
"Miss America" (1970)	"Silver Bird" (1970)	"And the Grass Won't Pay No Mind" (1970)

"Silver Bird" is a song written by Kenny Young and recorded by Mark Lindsay, in his solo career after Paul Revere and the Raiders.

== Background ==
"Silver Bird' was recorded along with L.A. session musicians from the Wrecking Crew in 1969.

== Chart performance ==
The single reached number 25 on the U.S. Billboard Hot 100 during the summer of 1970. In Canada, "Silver Bird" peaked at number 10.

=== Weekly charts ===
Chart (1970)	Peak position
Australia (Kent Music Report)	33
Canada RPM Top Singles	10
New Zealand (Listener)	15
U.S. Billboard Hot 100	25
U.S. Billboard Adult Contemporary	7
U.S. Cash Box Top 100	20

=== Year-end charts ===
Chart (1970)	Rank
U.S. Cash Box	94

== Popular culture ==
- Yamaha used the music from "Silver Bird", with rewritten lyrics, as the background to at least one of its early 1970s motorcycle commercials.
- The 2022 Netflix movie The Gray Man, starring Ryan Gosling, features the song in the early depiction of Claire Fitzroy as well as in a scene at the end where she is told to play it in order to not hear gunfire.
