= Arizona (song) =

Single by Mark Lindsay

from the album Arizona
- B-side: "Man from Houston"
- Released: November 1969
- Genre: Pop
- Length: 3:06
- Label: Columbia
- Songwriter: Kenny Young
- Producer: Jerry Fuller

Mark Lindsay singles chronology
"First Hymn from Grand Terrace" (1969)	"Arizona" (1969)	"Miss America" (1970)

"Arizona" is a song written by Kenny Young and recorded in 1969 by Mark Lindsay, a solo effort while still lead singer for Paul Revere and the Raiders. Lindsay was backed by L.A. session musicians from the Wrecking Crew. The single peaked at number 10 on the Billboard Hot 100 chart on 14 February 1970 and was awarded a RlAA Gold Disc in April 1970. A version by the British band The Family Dogg was also released in 1969.

== Overview ==
The song's title, "Arizona", refers to the singer's girlfriend, whom he considers innocent and naïve. The singer wistfully describes Arizona's idealism and lifestyle, which he considers absurd and immature ("you're acting like a teeny bopper runaway child"). He then urges Arizona to discard her hippie trappings, including "hobo shoes", "rainbow shades", and "Indian braids", and view the world through more realistic eyes. However, even as he exhorts Arizona to become more worldly, the singer continues to praise her, describing Arizona as "a little-town saint". In the end, his love for Arizona and what she represents to him overcomes his cynicism, and the singer decides to follow her example, adopting her view of the world, instead of expecting her to accept his.

== Charts ==
=== Weekly charts ===
Chart (1969–70)	Peak position
Australia (KMR)	10
Canada Top Singles (RPM)	4
Canada Adult Contemporary (RPM)	15
New Zealand (Listener)	2
South Africa (Springbok Radio)	3
US Billboard Hot 100	10
US Easy Listening (Billboard)	16
US Cash Box Top 100	9

=== Year-end charts ===
Chart (1970)	Rank
Australia	62
Canada Top Singles (RPM)	70
US Billboard Hot 100	66
US Cash Box Top 100	61
