= Him or Me – What's It Gonna Be? =

1967 single by Paul Revere & the Raiders

"Him Or Me – What's It Gonna Be?"
- Columbia sleeve for the single

Single by Paul Revere & the Raiders

from the album Revolution!
- B-side: "Legend of Paul Revere"
- Released: April 1967
- Genre: Pop rock; psychedelic pop
- Length: 2:52
- Label: Columbia
- Songwriters: Mark Lindsay; Terry Melcher
- Producer: Terry Melcher

Paul Revere & the Raiders singles chronology
"Ups and Downs" (1967)	"Him Or Me – What's It Gonna Be?" (1967)	"I Had A Dream" (1967)

"Him or Me – What's It Gonna Be?" is a song written by Mark Lindsay and Terry Melcher, recorded by American rock band Paul Revere & the Raiders for their seventh studio album Revolution! It can be distinguished from other previous Raiders garage rock hits like "Kicks" and "Hungry" because of its more pop-flavored sound.

Released in 1967, the single, with the biographical "Legend of Paul Revere" as the B-side, became a hit after peaking at No. 5 on June 10. It would prove to be their fourth and last Top 10 hit, until "Indian Reservation (The Lament of the Cherokee Reservation Indian)". (Note: See Paul Revere & the Raiders discography)

== Composition and recording ==
Like their previous Top 10 hit, "Good Thing", the song was written by Raiders lead singer Mark Lindsay and producer Terry Melcher like all the other Revolution! tracks. They used to write album cuts in their shared home in 10050 Cielo Drive, famous for the Tate-LaBianca murders. Melcher wrote the chorus and Lindsay developed the rest.

Initially, the latter thought that the writing credits were unfair, because he wrote most of the song, but later he concluded that "Him or Me" was Melcher's idea, and wouldn't write the song without him.

At the time, the band's tight schedule of television appearances made Melcher use the Wrecking Crew session musicians (specifically Hal Blaine, Ry Cooder, Jerry Cole and Glen Campbell) to do the instrumental backing of the song. Melcher also added backing vocals in addition of Lindsay's lead. The song is one of the two songs of Paul Revere & the Raiders, along with "Indian Reservation", to be included in the Kent Hartman's list of songs played by the Wrecking Crew in the book The Wrecking Crew: The Inside Story of Rock and Roll's Best-Kept Secret.

== Charts ==
=== Weekly charts ===
Chart (1967)	Peak position
Canada (RPM 100)	2
Sweden (Kvällstoppen)	8
Sweden (Tio i Topp)	2
US Billboard Hot 100	5
US Cash Box Top 100	9
US (Record World 100 Top Pops)	6

=== Year-end charts ===
Chart (1967)	Peak position
US Cash Box	95
