= Alias Pink Puzz =

Studio album by Paul Revere and the Raiders
- Released: July 1969
- Label: Columbia, Sundazed
- Producer: Mark Lindsay

Paul Revere and the Raiders chronology
Hard 'N' Heavy (with Marshmallow) (1969)	Alias Pink Puzz (1969)	Collage (1970)

Professional ratings
Review scores
Source	Rating
AllMusic	3/5 stars

Alias Pink Puzz is the eleventh studio album by Paul Revere and the Raiders.

== Background ==
The title was a humorous reference to the band's tactic of sending the new record to a Los Angeles FM radio station under a pseudonym. It was broadcast as long as the station did not know that "Pink Puzz" was Paul Revere and the Raiders. This album was slanted towards folk rock more than other albums released by this group. Songs such as "Thank You", "Down in Amsterdam", "Original Handyman" and "Louisiana Redbone" led the way towards the folk rock theme. "Freeborn Man" became a bluegrass staple for Jimmy Martin in 1969, and was later covered in 1976 by the Southern rock band Outlaws.

Alias Pink Puzz charted higher than any Raiders album during the previous two years, reaching No. 48 in the United States and No. 46 in Canada, but stayed on the chart for fewer weeks than any other Raiders album since 1965. The single "Let Me!" reached #20 on the U.S. pop chart in 1969 and ranked #100 on Billboard magazine's Top 100 singles of 1969. The album was re-released on CD by Sundazed and again later on Raven.

The Raiders were one of the many rock groups invited to the Woodstock concert but they turned down the invitation.

== Track listing ==
=== Side 1 ===
1. "Let Me!" (Lindsay) – 3:59
2. "Thank You" (Lindsay) – 3:01
3. "Frankfort Side Street" (Lindsay) – 3:02
4. "Hey Babro" (Lindsay) – 2:31
5. "Louisiana Redbone" (Allison, Lindsay) – 2:12
6. "Here Comes The Pain" (Allison, Lindsay) – 3:14

=== Side 2 ===
1. "The Original Handy Man" (Lindsay) – 2:28
2. "I Need You" (Allison, Lindsay) – 2:02
3. "Down In Amsterdam" (Allison, Lindsay) – 3:58
4. "I Don't Know" (Lindsay) – 5:31
5. "Freeborn Man" (Allison, Lindsay) – 3:35

=== Bonus Tracks (2000 Sundazed CD Reissue) ===
1. "Let Me!" (single version)
2. "Too Much Talk" (demo version)
3. "Get Out Of My Mind" (demo version)
4. "I Don't Know" (alternate version)

== Personnel ==
- Mark Lindsay – lead vocals, producer
- Paul Revere – keyboards, vocals
- Freddy Weller - guitar, vocals
- Keith Allison - bass, guitar, piano, organ, vocals
- Joe Correro Jr. – drums, congas, vocals
