= Indian Reservation (The Lament of the Cherokee Reservation Indian) =

Song written by John D. Loudermilk

Single by Don Fardon
- B-side: "Dreamin' Room"
- Released: November 3, 1967
- Genre: Blues
- Length: 3:23
- Label: Pye; GNP Crescendo
- Songwriter: John D. Loudermilk
- Producer: Miki Dallon

Don Fardon singles chronology
"It's Been Nice Lovin' You" (1967)	"Indian Reservation (The Lament of the Cherokee Reservation Indian)" (1967)	"Take A Heart" (1968)

Audio
- "Indian Reservation" on YouTube

"Indian Reservation (The Lament of the Cherokee Reservation Indian)" is a song written by John D. Loudermilk. It was first recorded by Marvin Rainwater in 1959 and released on MGM as "The Pale Faced Indian", but that release went unnoticed. The first hit version was a 1967 recording by Don Fardon – a former member of the Sorrows – that reached number 20 on the Hot 100 in 1968 and number 3 on the UK Singles Chart in 1970.

In 1971, Paul Revere & the Raiders recorded "Indian Reservation" for Columbia Records, and it topped the Hot 100 on July 24. On June 30, 1971, the RIAA gold certified the record for selling over a million copies. The record was later certified platinum for selling an additional million copies. The song was the group's only Hot 100 number-one hit and their only Hot 100 top 20 song after they changed their name (see Paul Revere and The Raiders). The song was recorded by Roots Reggae and dub artists in the 1970s : in 1972, Sioux Records released two versions of the song, by Jackie Rowland and another by Funky Brown, and later, in 1977, Lee "Scratch" Perry released at least two vocal and dub versions of the record, recorded at the Black Ark Studios and attributed to The African Brotherhood, with the dub version appearing on the 1983 album, "Lee "Scratch" Perry* – Presents - Heart Of The Ark Vol 2."

== Lyrics ==
A well-known story told by Loudermilk is that when he was asked by the Viva! NashVegas radio show about the origins of the song "Indian Reservation," he fabricated the story that he wrote the song after his car was snowed in by a blizzard and he was taken in by a small group of Cherokee Indians. A self-professed prankster, he spun the tale that a Cherokee chieftain, "Bloody Bear Tooth," asked him to make a song about his people's plight on the Trail of Tears, even going so far as to claim that he had later been awarded "the first medal of the Cherokee Nation," not for writing the song, but for his "blood." He went on to fabricate the detail that on that day the tribe revealed that his "great-great-grandparents, Homer and Matilda Loudermilk" were listed on the Dawes Rolls (the citizenship rolls of the Nation). Had this detail of his tall tale been true, he would have been a citizen of the Cherokee Nation, which he was not.

Despite the song's title, the Eastern Band of Cherokee Indians, the United Keetoowah Band of Cherokee Indians and the Cherokee Nation of Oklahoma are not known as "reservations", and singing that they may someday "return" is at odds with the fact that these Cherokee Nations still exist.

The lyrics vary somewhat among the recorded versions. Rainwater's version lacks the "Cherokee people!" chorus but includes instead a series of "Hiya, hiya, ho!" chants. Fardon's version is similar to the Raiders' through the first verse and chorus, but differs in the second verse, which includes the lines "Altho' they changed our ways of old/They'll never change our heart and soul", also found in Rainwater's version. Rainwater includes some of the elements found in the other versions in a different order, and his first verse has words not found in the others, such as "They put our papoose in a crib/and took the buck skin from our rib".

At the end, where the Raiders sing "...Cherokee nation will return", Fardon says "Cherokee Indian...", while the line is absent in Rainwater's version, which ends with "beads...nowadays made in Japan." In addition, Fardon sings the line: "Brick built houses by the score/ No more tepees anymore", not used in the Raiders' version.

Cherokee people have never lived in tipis, nor do they use the term "papoose". These are stereotypes and misconceptions, with the reservations and tipi assumptions usually based on Hollywood portrayals of Plains Indians. However, the Cherokee are a Southeastern Woodlands Indigenous culture.

Among the things taken away from the Cherokees include the tomahawk and the Bowie knife. Also, English replaced their native tongue. In addition, the Raiders' version mentions that "though I wear a shirt and tie, I'm still part red man deep inside", altered from the Rainwater-sung line "and though I wear a white man's tie / I'll be a red man 'til I die".

== Song structure ==
The music is in a minor key, with sustained minor chords ending each phrase in the primary melody, while the melody line goes through a slow musical turn (turning of related notes) which ends each phrase, and emphasizes the ominous minor chords. Underneath the slow, paced melody, is a rhythmic, low "drum beat" in double-time, constantly, relentlessly pushing to follow along, but the melody continues its slow, deliberate pace above the drum beat.

The instrumentation varies among versions. Rainwater's recording is acoustic with strings and backing vocals supporting the melody. Fardon's version adds a brass section and percussion while reducing the background singing. The Raiders used similar instruments to Fardon, and included an electronic organ that holds the melody line.

== Raiders version ==
"Indian Reservation (The Lament of the Cherokee Reservation Indian)"

Single by Raiders

from the album Indian Reservation
- B-side: "Terry's Tune"
- Released: February 1971
- Recorded: December 3, 1970
- Genre: Garage rock
- Length: 2:55
- Label: Columbia
- Songwriter: John D. Loudermilk
- Producer: Mark Lindsay

Raiders singles chronology
"Gone Movin' On" (1970)	"Indian Reservation (The Lament of the Cherokee Reservation Indian)" (1971)	"Birds of a Feather" (1971)

In 1970, the Raiders were looking for new material when Columbia A&R head Jack Gold offered "Indian Reservation" to them. Mark Lindsay decided to produce the recording himself, as he had been producing all of the Raiders recordings since "Too Much Talk" in 1968. The band's keyboardist Paul Revere promoted the single on radio stations across the country. After four years without a Raiders Top 10 hit since "Him or Me – What's It Gonna Be?", "Indian Reservation" reached the top of the charts on July 24, becoming the first and only number one hit for the band.

=== Personnel ===
According to the AFM contract sheet and the website Best Classic Bands, the following musicians played on the track.

- Hal Blaine – drums
- Artie Butler – piano, organ, arrangements
- Al Casey – guitar
- Gary Coleman or Victor Feldman – percussion
- David Cohen – guitar
- John D'Andrea – strings arrangements
- Mark Lindsay – lead vocals
- Carol Kaye – bass guitar
- Louie Shelton – guitar (per contract sheet)
- Unknown singers – backing vocals

=== Certifications ===
Region	Certification	Certified units/sales
United States (RIAA)	Platinum	1,000,000^{^}
^{^} Shipments figures based on certification alone.

== Charts ==
The Raiders' "Indian Reservation" entered the Billboard Hot 100 on April 10, 1971. On July 24, it reached the top spot for a single week. "Indian Reservation" spent a total of 22 weeks on the Billboard Hot 100 chart.

=== Weekly charts ===
The Raiders

Chart (1971)	Peak position
Canada Top Singles (RPM)	2
Canada Adult Contemporary (RPM)	10
New Zealand (Listener)	14
US Billboard Hot 100	1
US Cash Box Top 100	1

Don Fardon

Chart (1968, 1970)	Peak position
Australia	4
Canada (RPM)	18
UK Singles Chart (Official Charts Company)	3
US Billboard Hot 100	20

Orlando Riva Sound

Chart (1979)	Peak position
West Germany (Hitparade)	7

999

Chart (1981)	Peak position
UK Singles Chart (Official Charts Company)	51

=== Year-end charts ===
The Raiders

Chart (1971)	Rank
Canada Top Singles (RPM)	27
US Billboard Hot 100	6
US Cash Box Top 100	3

== Other versions ==
Billy ThunderKloud & the Chieftones recorded the song in 1976 for Polydor Records, taking their version to number 74 on Hot Country Songs.

The Kentucky soul group New Birth recorded a new version of this song called "African Cry" in 1972, with the lyrics changed to reflect the African-American experience.

A disco version was recorded by the German band Orlando Riva Sound in 1979. It was a national chart success, reaching number 7 and staying five weeks in the German Top 10.

The English punk band 999 released their version on November 14, 1981, on the Albion Ion label, and it reached number 51 in the UK chart.

The American hardcore punk band Ill Repute released a version titled "Cherokee Nation" on their 1984 album "What Happens Next?"

Slovenian art collective Laibach recorded the song, retitled to "National Reservation", on their 1994 album NATO.

Indigenous electronic music group the Halluci Nation has sampled the song on several occasions.

Native American Country artist Buddy Red Bow covered the song for his self titled album.

== See also ==
- List of anti-war songs
- Paul Revere & the Raiders discography
- Stereotypes of indigenous peoples of Canada and the United States
- XIT, a Native American rock band active from 1968 to 2011
