= 10050 Cielo Drive =

Former home of Sharon Tate

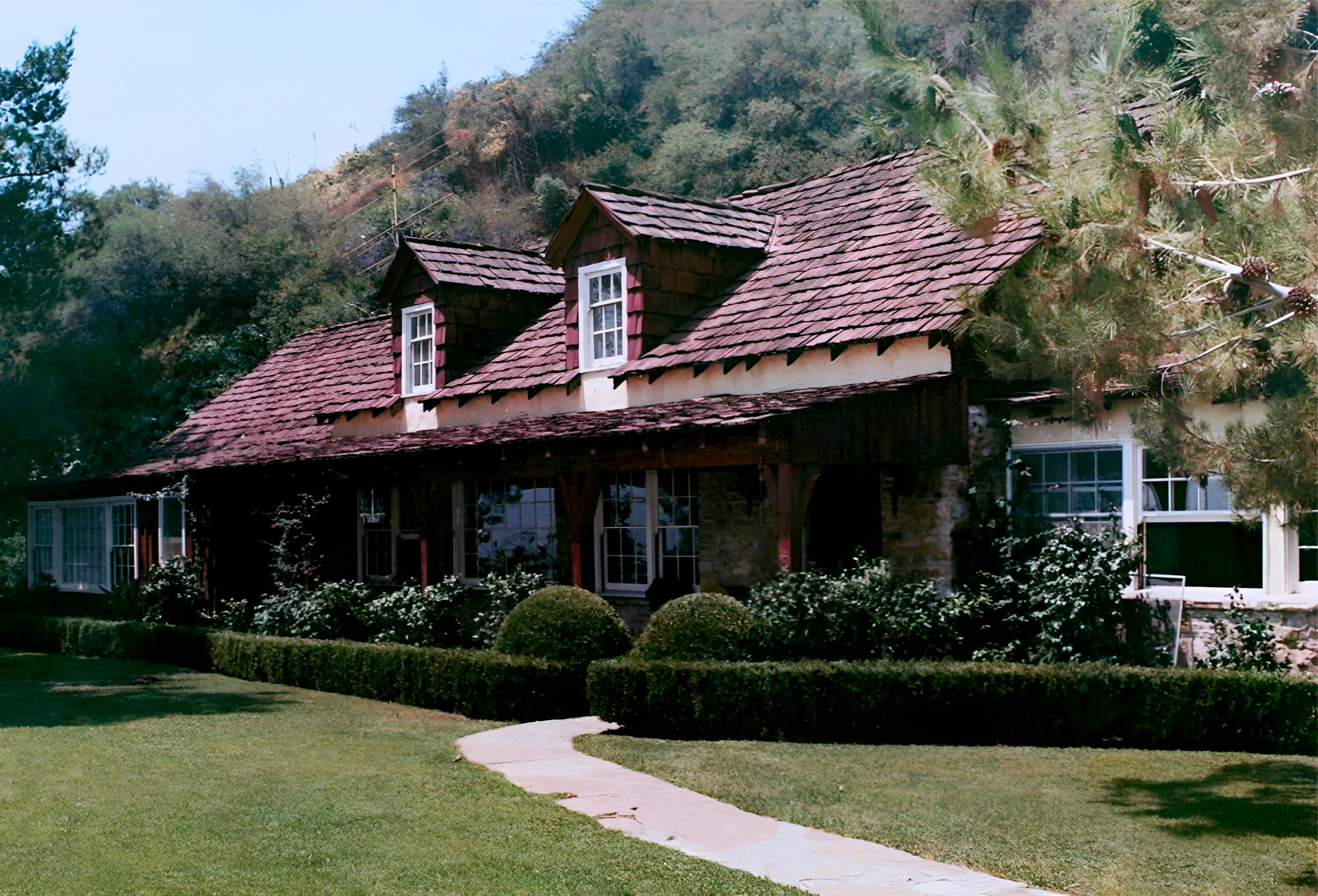

- Location within the Los Angeles metropolitan area

General information
- Type: House
- Architectural style: French Country
- Location: Benedict Canyon, Los Angeles
- Coordinates: 34°05′38″N 118°25′57″W
- Construction started: 1941
- Completed: 1942
- Demolished: 1994
- Client: Michèle Morgan

Technical details
- Floor area: 3,200 sq ft (300 m^{2})

Design and construction
- Architect: Arthur W. Hawes

10050 Cielo Drive was the street address of a former luxury home in Benedict Canyon, in the west-central part of the Beverly Crest neighborhood of Los Angeles, bordering Beverly Hills, where three members of the Manson Family committed the Tate murders in 1969.

The property had a main residence, a guest house, a pool, and a two-story garage. The main house was occupied by various famous Hollywood and music industry figures. In 1994, both houses were demolished, and a new house was constructed on the site. The street address was subsequently changed to 10066 Cielo Drive.

== Architecture ==
The original house was designed by Arthur W. Hawes in 1941 and completed in 1942 for French actress Michèle Morgan. It was similar to the house which sat on its own plateau directly below 10050, 10048 Cielo Drive, which was often called the Twin House.

The French country-style structure was located on 3 acres (1.2 ha), and included a private drive on Cielo Drive in Benedict Canyon, an area west of Hollywood in the Santa Monica Mountains that overlooks Beverly Hills and Bel Air. The hillside structure faced east and was surrounded by thick pine and flowering cherry trees.

According to official documents with the Los Angeles Department of Building and Safety, the architect of record for this home was Arthur W. Hawes (1873–1951). The builder was J.F. Wadkins Corp.

== History ==
Michèle Morgan, French actress for RKO Radio Pictures, arranged for architect Arthur W. Hawes to design a home and for J.F. Wadkins to build the luxury home resembling an early 19th-century European-style farmhouse. The house was completed in 1942, with an address of 10050 Cielo Drive. It was on a 3.3-acre level lot above Benedict Canyon in Beverly Hills. The home included a 3,200 square foot main residence, barbecue shelter, swimming pool, and a 2-story garage. According to the Los Angeles Times, Morgan paid $32,000 (equivalent to $470,000 in 2020). By the end of World War II, Morgan returned to France. In 1944, the house was sold to Dr. Hartley Dewey and his wife, Louise, who converted the barbecue shelter into a guest house and added a dressing room for the pool. In 1946, the Deweys rented the home to Lillian Gish while she was filming Duel in the Sun.

Rudolph Altobelli (1929–2011), a music and film industry talent manager, bought the house for $86,000 in the early 1960s and often rented it out. Residents included Cary Grant and Dyan Cannon (it was their honeymoon nest in 1965); Henry Fonda; George Chakiris; Mark Lindsay; Samantha Eggar; and Olivia Hussey. Charles Manson visited the house in late 1968, when it was occupied (from May 1967 to January 1969) by couple Terry Melcher (the son of actress Doris Day) and Candice Bergen. Paul Revere & the Raiders' 1966 Billboard Hot 100 top-ten hit "Good Thing" was penned by Lindsay and Melcher at the residence.

In February 1969, Roman Polanski and his wife Sharon Tate began renting the home from Altobelli. On August 9, 1969, the home became the scene of the murders of the eight-months-pregnant Sharon Tate, Wojciech Frykowski, Abigail Folger, Jay Sebring, and Steven Parent committed by Tex Watson, Susan Atkins, and Patricia Krenwinkel, members of the Manson Family cult. Charles Manson himself was an associate of Melcher and previously visited the house. William Garretson, Altobelli's caretaker and an acquaintance of Parent, lived in the guest house behind the main house and was unaware of the murders until the next morning, when he was taken into custody by police officers who arrived at the scene. He was later cleared of all charges.

Altobelli moved into the house just three weeks after the murders and resided there until 1988. During an interview on ABC's show 20/20, he said that while living there, he felt "safe, secure, loved, and beauty". The house was then sold to John Prell, a real estate investor. The purchase price was $1.6 million in 1989 (equivalent to $4 million in 2025). In 1992, Prell sold the property to Alvin Weintraub, another real estate investor.

=== Nine Inch Nails and Marilyn Manson ===
The final resident of the original house was the musician Trent Reznor of Nine Inch Nails. Reznor rented the house in 1992 and set up a recording studio there. This studio, dubbed "Pig" (sometimes called "Le Pig") in a reference to murderer Susan Atkins' writing "Pig" in Tate's blood on the front door of the house, was the site of recording sessions for most of the Nine Inch Nails album The Downward Spiral (1994). The band also recorded the EP Broken and filmed the video for "Gave Up" at 10050 Cielo Drive. Marilyn Manson recorded sections of the album Portrait of an American Family at the in-house studio in 1992.

Reznor moved out in December 1993, later explaining, "There was too much history in that house for me to handle."

Reznor made a statement about working in the Tate house during a 1997 interview with Rolling Stone:

While I was working on Downward Spiral, I was living in the house where Sharon Tate was killed. Then one day I met her sister. It was a random thing, just a brief encounter. And she said: "Are you exploiting my sister's death by living in her house?" For the first time, the whole thing kind of slapped me in the face. I said, "No, it's just sort of my own interest in American folklore. I'm in this place where a weird part of history occurred." I guess it never really struck me before, but it did then. She lost her sister in a senseless, ignorant situation that I don't want to support. When she was talking to me, I realized for the first time, "What if it were my sister?" I thought, "Fuck Charlie Manson. I don't want to be looked at as a guy who supports serial-killer bullshit." I went home and cried that night. It made me see there's another side to things, you know? It's one thing to go around with your dick swinging in the wind, acting like it doesn't matter. But when you understand the repercussions that are felt ... that's what sobered me up: realizing that what balances out the appeal of the lawlessness and the lack of morality and that whole thing is the other end of it, the victims who don't deserve that.

Reznor took the front door of the house with him when he moved out, installing it at Nothing Studios, his new recording studio/record label headquarters in New Orleans. Nothing Studios was later sold and the façade of the building changed. Christopher Moore, a New Orleans artist, acquired the front door from the owner of the building, and then in September 2023, the door was sold in an auction to an undisclosed buyer for $127,000 by Julien’s Auctions.

=== Demolition ===
After renting out the house, Alvin Weintraub had it demolished in early 1994, and construction on a new home began shortly after. In 1996, the newly constructed home, which he named Villa Bella, was completed, and he obtained a new address for the property, 10066 Cielo Drive. It is an 18,000-square-foot Mediterranean-style mansion. When he listed Villa Bella for sale in 1998, Weintraub told Los Angeles magazine that this was not the Manson murder house, saying "We went to great pains to get rid of everything ... There's no house, no dirt, no blade of grass remotely connected to Sharon Tate." However, there is one remaining pine tree that exists between the house and pool on the property as well as two wooden posts that were originally part of an arbor.

The owner of the property as of December 2013 was Hollywood producer Jeff Franklin. In 2010, he made a comment to Architectural Digest: "What I fell in love with here was the setting, the view, the privacy, and the amount of flat land" but complained that the design of the house was badly conceived. The property was on the market in August 2019, showing an estimated price of $97 million. It again was on the market in January 2022 for $85 million, reduced in price in June 2022 to just under $70 million. By March 2025, the house had a listing price of almost $50 million.
