= Good Thing (Paul Revere & the Raiders song) =

- US single sleeve

Single by Paul Revere & the Raiders featuring Mark Lindsay

from the album The Spirit of '67
- B-side: "Undecided Man"
- Released: November 16, 1966
- Recorded: September 9, 1966
- Studio: Columbia Square, Los Angeles
- Genre: Garage rock; rock and roll
- Length: 3:07
- Label: Columbia
- Songwriters: Mark Lindsay; Terry Melcher
- Producer: Terry Melcher

Paul Revere & the Raiders featuring Mark Lindsay singles chronology
"The Great Airplane Strike" (1966)	"Good Thing" (1966)	"Ups and Downs" (1967)

Audio
- "Good Thing" on YouTube

"Good Thing" is a song written by vocalist Mark Lindsay and producer Terry Melcher, originally recorded by Lindsay's band Paul Revere & the Raiders in 1966. It was the first collaboration between Lindsay and Melcher, after the band had recorded singles by outside songwriters. The duo wrote the song at Melcher's residence on 10050 Cielo Drive, and were inspired by the Raiders' earlier single "Hungry". Musically, the song is a mixture between rock and roll and garage rock, and features a vocal interlude influenced by the Beach Boys. Paul Revere & the Raiders recorded "Good Thing" at Columbia Square studios in Los Angeles, with Melcher producing.

Columbia Records released "Good Thing" as a single on November 16, 1966 and featured it as the opening track to the album The Spirit of '67 the same month. "Good Thing" continued the string of successful hit singles by Paul Revere & the Raiders, reaching number four on the Billboard Hot 100 in January 1967. The single received good reviews upon release, with several critics noting similarities between "Good Thing" and the Rolling Stones. Retrospectively, "Good Thing" has had a pivotal role in the 2019 Quentin Tarantino film Once Upon a Time in Hollywood.

== Composition and recording ==
"Good Thing" was composed by Paul Revere & the Raiders lead vocalist Mark Lindsay together with producer Terry Melcher. With the group developing its songwriting talent for their album Midnight Ride (1966), their latest single "Hungry" had still been written by outside songwriters Barry Mann and Cynthia Weil. After the release of that single, Lindsay told Melcher that he "bet they could write a song as good as 'Hungry'". (Note: "Good Thing" was the first song written by Lindsay and Melcher, though "The Great Airplane Strike" was the first of their compositions to be released as a single.) Lindsay and Melcher wrote the song at their shared residence at 10050 Cielo Drive after listening to an early single copy of "Hungry" "over and over again". When Melcher asked for a title, Lindsay replied with the chorus of "Hungry": "I’m hungry for those good things, baby". The verses were composed by Lindsay, whereas the song's break-down and middle eight were written by Melcher. According to Joe Marchese of The Second Disc, "Good Thing" marked Lindsay as "blossoming as a songwriter in his own right"

Musically, Lindsay characterized "Good Thing" as "hard-edged rock and roll" tailored for his voice, whereas Steve Leggett of AllMusic believes it to adhere to the "punk garage sound" of their prior hits "Just Like Me", “Kicks" and "Hungry". The guitar arrangement was influenced by Motown. "Good Thing" features a Beach Boys-inspired harmony interlude, most likely influenced by their album Pet Sounds on which Melcher had performed as a session musician. "Good Thing" reperesented an "overall more sophisticated sound" compared to Paul Revere & the Raider's prior music. It was recorded on September 9, 1966 at the Columbia Square Studios in Los Angeles. According to William Ruhlmann, "Good Thing" was the final song the band played together, owing to Melcher's preference for studio musicians. As such, Van Dyke Parks appears on the track augmenting Paul Revere on keyboards. In addition, Marchese suggests that both guitarist Drake Levin and his successor Jim Valley play guitars on "Good Thing".

== Release and reception ==
Columbia Records originally released "Good Thing" as a single in the US on November 16, 1966. (Note: Catalogue number Columbia 4-43907.) The single's B-side "Undecided Man" was written by Melcher with Revere. The single release was credited as "Paul Revere & the Raiders featuring Mark Lindsay". On November 28, both sides of the singles were featured on Paul Revere & the Raiders fourth Columbia album The Spirit of '67, where "Good Thing" acted as the opening track. "Good Thing" entered the Billboard Hot 100 in early December 1966, before reaching a peak of number four on January 14, 1967. In total, "Good Thing" spent 12 weeks on the Hot 100 and was Paul Revere & the Raiders' fifth straight top-twenty hit. In Canada, "Good Thing" reached number three.

Upon release, "Good Thing" received good reviews, with the Billboard staff writers calling it a "raucous swinger" that should "hit hard and fast", noting it to be aimed "straight for the top of the charts". The staff reviewer for Cash Box characterized the single as a "strong link in the chain" to the band's previous hits. They noted "Good Thing" as a "hard driving rocker" which was "prime material for both dancing and listening". According to Record World, the single "moves and grooves", which the staff reviewer noted was "nitty and gritty" and something that "the kids would declare a good thing". Among British reviewers, Penny Valentine found the band to sound "more like the early [Rolling] Stones" than before, but believed it to be acceptable as it was the first of their singles she liked. Similarly, Chris Hayes of Melody Maker found "Good Thing" derivative of both the Rolling Stones and the Beach Boys, and found the song's rhythm and blues sound to be reminiscent of the Pretty Things. Nonetheless, he found the record "exciting". Peter Jones of Record Mirror found the single to have "all the usual punch" and described it as "fast, furious and frantic".

Retrospectively, "Good Thing" became a "familiar radio track". According to Ruhlmann, "The Great Airplane Strike" and "Good Things" were the two tracks that "anchored" The Spirit of '67, as they both featured the "twangy guitar rock sound common to 1966". John Visconti of CultureSonar listed "Good Thing" as one of Paul Revere & The Raiders six best songs, praising Lindsay's lead vocals as a "seething, snarling" workout that featured "stellar" backing vocals and instrumental works from the band.

== Role in Once Upon a Time in Hollywood ==
Together with "Hungry" and "Mr. Sun, Mr. Moon", "Good Thing" is one of three Paul Revere & the Raiders songs Quentin Tarantino featured in his 2019 film Once Upon a Time in Hollywood. "Good Thing" is prominently featured in the movie's trailer. Part of the film follows actress Sharon Tate (performed by Margot Robbie) in an alternative timeline where she doesn't get murdered in the Tate–LaBianca murders that occurred in the house on 10050 Cielo Drive, the same house "Good Thing" was written in. According to writer August Brown of Los Angeles Times, it is this coincidence that ties Once Upon a Time in Hollywood together; all of Tarantino's obsessions regarding "vintage rock and roll, movie-business lore, darkly comic idylls cut through with horrific violence" all "wound through" the house on Cielo Drive. Lindsay had been a fan of Tarantino "for a long time" and felt it was an honor to have a song of his featured in the film.

== Personnel ==
Personnel according to the 2016 re-issue of The Spirit of '67, unless otherwise noted.

Paul Revere & The Raiders

- Mark Lindsay – lead vocals
- Paul Revere – piano, keyboards, organ
- Drake Levin – guitars
- Phil Volk – bass guitar
- Mike "Smitty" Smith – drums, percussion
- Jim Valley – guitar

Other personnel

- Terry Melcher – producer, arranger, keyboards, harmony vocals
- Van Dyke Parks – keyboards

== Charts ==
=== Weekly charts ===
Chart (1966–1967)	Peak position
Canada RPM 100	3
US Billboard Hot 100	4
US Cash Box Top 100	5
US Record World 100 Top Pops	4

=== Year-end charts ===
Chart (1967)	Peak position
Canada (RPM)	33
US (Cash Box)	98
