= Like, Long Hair =

Single by Paul Revere & the Raiders
- B-side: "Sharon"
- Released: December 1960
- Recorded: 1960
- Genre: Instrumental rock, garage rock
- Label: Gardena
- Composers: Paul Revere & the Raiders
- Producer: Gary Paxton

Paul Revere & the Raiders singles chronology
"Unfinished Fifth" (1960)	"Like, Long Hair" (1960)	"Midnight Ride" (1961)

"Like, Long Hair" is a 1961 Top 40 hit song by American rock band Paul Revere & the Raiders. An instrumental composed by the group and arranged by Gary Paxton, it spent six weeks on the Billboard Hot 100, peaking at No. 38. In Canada it reached number 24.

A piano-based twelve bar blues with a "twist" beat and an electric guitar break, it opens and closes with crashing concerto-like chords, the "long hair" of the title; "Like" was a beatnik-era particle with no particular meaning.
