= The Spirit of '67 (Paul Revere & the Raiders album) =

Studio album by Paul Revere & the Raiders
- Released: November 28, 1966
- Recorded: 1966
- Genres: Psychedelic rock; garage rock
- Length: 31:46
- Label: Columbia
- Producer: Terry Melcher

Paul Revere & the Raiders chronology
Midnight Ride (1966)	The Spirit of '67 (1966)	Greatest Hits (1967)

Professional ratings
Review scores
Source	Rating
Allmusic	4/5 stars

The Spirit of '67 is the sixth studio album by American rock band Paul Revere & the Raiders. Produced by Terry Melcher and released in November 1966 by Columbia Records (CS 9395), and featured the singles "Hungry", "The Great Airplane Strike", and "Good Thing". The album was reissued on LP (with the title "Good Thing" and with "Oh! To Be a Man" omitted) by Harmony in 1971, by Sundazed on CD in 1996 (with three bonus tracks) and in 2015 by Friday Music on 180g clear red vinyl.

The album's two biggest chart hits — "Good Thing" and "Hungry" — both feature in Quentin Tarantino's 2019 film Once Upon a Time in Hollywood, as do two other tracks by the band. "Good Thing" also features in the film's trailer.

== Track listing ==
Side one
No.	Title	Length
1.	"Good Thing" (M. Lindsay, T. Melcher)	3:03
2.	"All About Her" (R. Gerhardt, M. Lindsay, T. Melcher)	3:01
3.	"In My Community" (P. Volk)	2:09
4.	"Louise" (L. Kincaid)	2:08
5.	"Why? Why? Why? (Is It So Hard)" (P. Volk)	2:57
6.	"Oh! To Be a Man" (M. Lindsay, P. Revere)	3:02

Side two
No.	Title	Length
7.	"Hungry" (B. Mann, C. Weill)	2:57
8.	"Undecided Man" (P. Revere, M. Lindsay)	1:48
9.	"Our Candidate" (M. Smith)	2:49
10.	"1001 Arabian Nights" (M. Lindsay, T. Melcher)	4:25
11.	"The Great Airplane Strike" (P. Revere, T. Melcher, M. Lindsay)	3:27

=== Sundazed Records (1996 CD issue, SC 6095) ===
1. "Good Thing" (M. Lindsay, T. Melcher)
2. "All About Her" (R. Gerhardt, M. Lindsay, T. Melcher)
3. "In My Community" (P. Volk)
4. "Louise" (L. Kincaid)
5. "Why? Why? Why? (Is It So Hard)" (P. Volk)
6. "Oh! To Be A Man" (M. Lindsay, P. Revere)
7. "Hungry" (B. Mann, C. Weill)
8. "Undecided Man" (P. Revere, M. Lindsay)
9. "Our Candidate" (M. Smith)
10. "1001 Arabian Nights" (M. Lindsay, T. Melcher)
11. "The Great Airplane Strike" (P. Revere, T. Melcher, M. Lindsay)
12. "(You're A) Bad Girl" (B. Johnston) (Bonus Track)
13. "Hungry" (Alternate mix) (Bonus Track)
14. "The Great Airplane Strike" (Single version) (Bonus Track)

== Personnel ==
Adapted from the liner notes of Now Sounds 2015 reissue, except where noted:

Paul Revere & the Raiders

- Mark Lindsay – lead vocals, percussion
- Paul Revere – keyboards, backing vocals
- Drake Levin – guitars, backing vocals
- Jim "Harpo" Valley – guitars, backing vocals
- Phil Volk – bass, backing vocals; lead vocals on "In My Community" and "Why? Why? Why?", guitar on "In My Community"
- Michael "Smitty" Smith – drums, percussion, backing vocals; lead vocals on "Our Candidate"

Additional personnel

- Terry Melcher – backing vocals, keyboards; producer, arranger, conductor
- Jerry Cole – additional guitars; bass on "Why? Why? Why?"
- Hal Blaine – drums, percussion on "Why? Why? Why?" and "Hungry"
- Jim Gordon – drums on "The Great Airplane Strike"
- Bruce Johnston – keyboards on "All About Her"
- Van Dyke Parks – keyboards on "Good Thing", “In My Community” and "Why? Why? Why?"
- Mort Garson – strings arranger and conductor on "Undecided Man"
