= Let Me (Paul Revere & the Raiders song) =

"Let Me!"

Single by Paul Revere & the Raiders

from the album Alias Pink Puzz
- B-side: "I Don't Know"
- Released: April 22, 1969
- Genre: Rock
- Length: 2:29 (Single); 3:58 (Album)
- Label: Columbia
- Songwriter: Mark Lindsay
- Producer: Mark Lindsay

Paul Revere & the Raiders singles chronology
| "Mr. Sun, Mr. Moon" (1969) | "Let Me!" (1969) | "We Gotta All Get Together" (1969) |

"Let Me!" is a song written by Mark Lindsay and performed by Paul Revere & the Raiders. The song was arranged and produced by Mark Lindsay. It was featured on their 1969 album Alias Pink Puzz.

It reached #20 on the U.S. pop chart in 1969. The song ranked #100 on Billboard magazine's Top 100 singles of 1969.
