= Mark Lindsay =

American rock singer (born 1942)

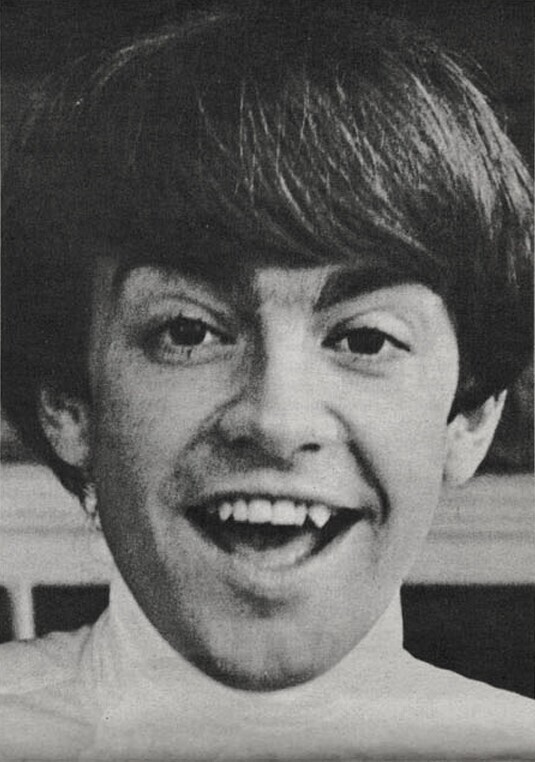
- Lindsay in mid-1966

Background information
- Born: March 9, 1942 (age 84); Eugene, Oregon, U.S.
- Genres: Rock
- Occupations: Singer; musician; songwriter
- Instruments: Vocals; saxophone
- Years active: 1958–present
- Formerly of: Paul Revere & the Raiders

Mark Lindsay (born March 9, 1942) is an American musician, best known as the lead singer of the rock band Paul Revere & the Raiders.

== Early life ==
Lindsay was born in Eugene, Oregon, and was the second of eight children of George and Esther Ellis Lindsay. The family moved to Idaho when he was young, where he attended Wilder High School.

== Career ==
=== Paul Revere & the Raiders ===
Lindsay began performing at age 15 with local bands that played local venues. He was tapped to sing in a band, Freddy Chapman and the Idaho Playboys, after he won a local talent contest. After Chapman left the area, Lindsay saw the other band members and a new member, Paul Revere Dick, playing at a local I.O.O.F. Hall. He persuaded the band to allow him to sing a few songs with them. The next day, he was working at McClure Bakery in Caldwell, Idaho, when Paul Revere came in to buy supplies for a hamburger restaurant that he owned. This chance meeting began their professional relationship. Lindsay became lead singer and saxophone player in a band with Revere and several others. He suggested they call themselves "The Downbeats" after a magazine with the same title. They made some demo tapes in 1960 in Boise, Idaho, and signed with a record company called Gardena Records. The group scored their first national hit with the piano/guitar instrumental "Like, Long Hair" which peaked at No. 38 in the Billboard charts on April 17, 1961. After changing personnel a few more times, the band recorded the song "Louie, Louie" about the same time that a rival Pacific Northwest band, the Kingsmen, did. The Kingsmen version was the one that charted nationally, but Mark and his bandmates also were gaining attention.

Around the time "Louie, Louie" was recorded, they decided to use Paul Revere's name as a gimmick and bill themselves as "Paul Revere & the Raiders". They began to dress in Revolutionary War-style outfits. Mark Lindsay carried the theme a bit further by growing his hair out and pulling it back into a ponytail, which became his signature look. Lindsay and the group caught the attention of Dick Clark, who was developing Where the Action Is, an afternoon show for the teen market. Clark hired the group as regular performers, and the group soon became very successful. Lindsay's lanky stature and good looks, as well as his excellent singing voice, quickly gained him immense popularity; he became one of the premier American teen idols of the 1960s.

Lindsay soon started working not only as the singer of the group, but also as a composer and producer. The Raiders were the first rock group signed by Columbia Records and were produced by Terry Melcher, the son of actress and singer Doris Day. Lindsay and Melcher became friends and shared a house for a while. The house later became infamous as the site of the horrific murders of actress Sharon Tate and others, committed by members of Charles Manson's "family."

=== Television ===
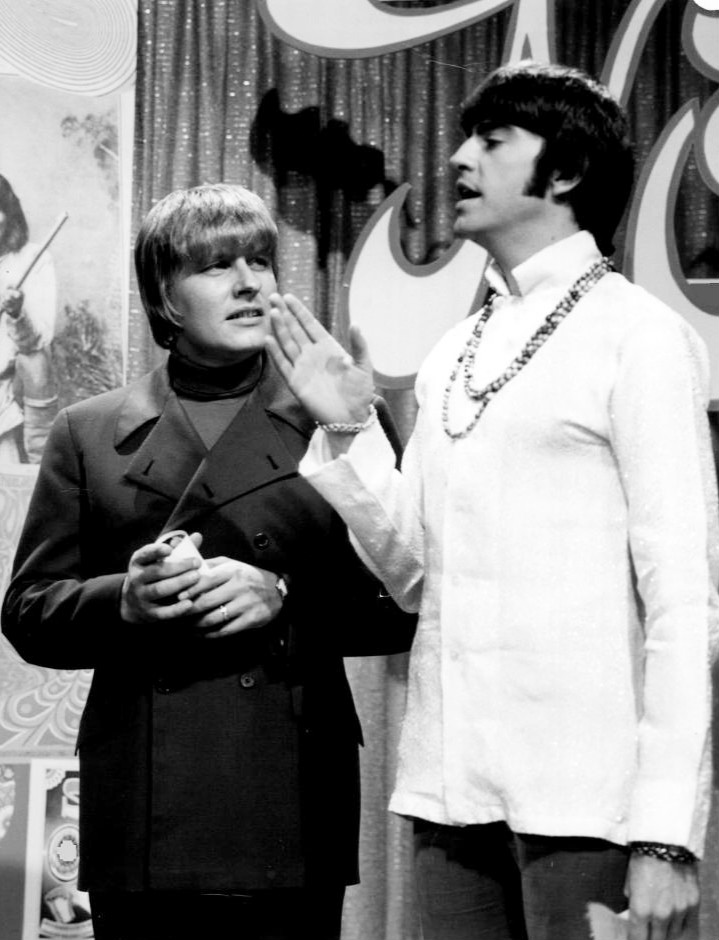
Lindsay and Revere on Happening 68

By 1968 Lindsay had completely taken over the writing and producing tasks for the group. Paul Revere & the Raiders had a revolving cast of band members, with only Revere and Lindsay remaining in the group since its inception. Where the Action Is had passed into television history. Dick Clark had created another show, Happening '68, which was to be hosted by Revere and Lindsay, and was to feature the group. The group itself was featured prominently in this show, whereas in Where the Action Is, the entire group was part of an ensemble of other musical performers. Happening '68 premiered in January 1968. The show was so popular that the group also hosted a daily version over the summer of 1968, called It's Happening. Happening '68 survived into 1969, at which point the name of the show became Happening. The show was canceled in October 1969. By this time, like many other groups, Mark Lindsay and his bandmates were trying to maintain their success, but also were exploring other opportunities. Lindsay began to record solo records and to produce records for his bandmate, Freddy Weller, who went on to have his own solo success in the country music genre. Lindsay earned a gold record for his version of "Arizona", which reached #10 on the Billboard chart and sold over one million copies in 1969. and "Silver Bird" (Billboard #25) in 1970.

Lindsay recorded "Indian Reservation", a song written by John Loudermilk and made into a Hot 100 top 20 hit by Don Fardon years earlier. It was intended to be a solo recording for Lindsay, but for marketing purposes, the decision was made to release the song under the simple band name of "Raiders" with just Lindsay & Revere appearing on the track along with L.A. session players from the Wrecking Crew, and the song was retitled with a subtitle, "Indian Reservation (The Lament of the Cherokee Reservation Indian)". The record reached No. 1 on the Hot 100, topping the Paul Revere & the Raiders' best at No. 4.

Lindsay continued to chart solo singles throughout 1970–71: "Miss America" (#44 – May 1970), "And the Grass Won't Pay No Mind" (#44 – November 1970), "Problem Child" (#80 – January 1971), "Been Too Long on the Road" (#98 – June 1971) and "Are You Old Enough" (#87 – October 1971). Lindsay kept his profile up by appearing on The Carpenters television variety show Make Your Own Kind of Music, as well as singing the themes to films Something Big (1971) and "Jody", the theme from Santee (1973 – credited to The Raiders).

By the mid-seventies the group no longer sold as many records as they once had, and both Lindsay and the Raiders lost their Columbia contract. According to a contemporary Rolling Stone interview, Lindsay left The Raiders in 1975 because "there was a contractual thing I didn't agree with, and I just stopped." He went on to make a few appearances during the 1976 for United States Bicentennial, as well as a Dick Clark produced reunion with his Action era bandmates in 1977.

=== Later works ===
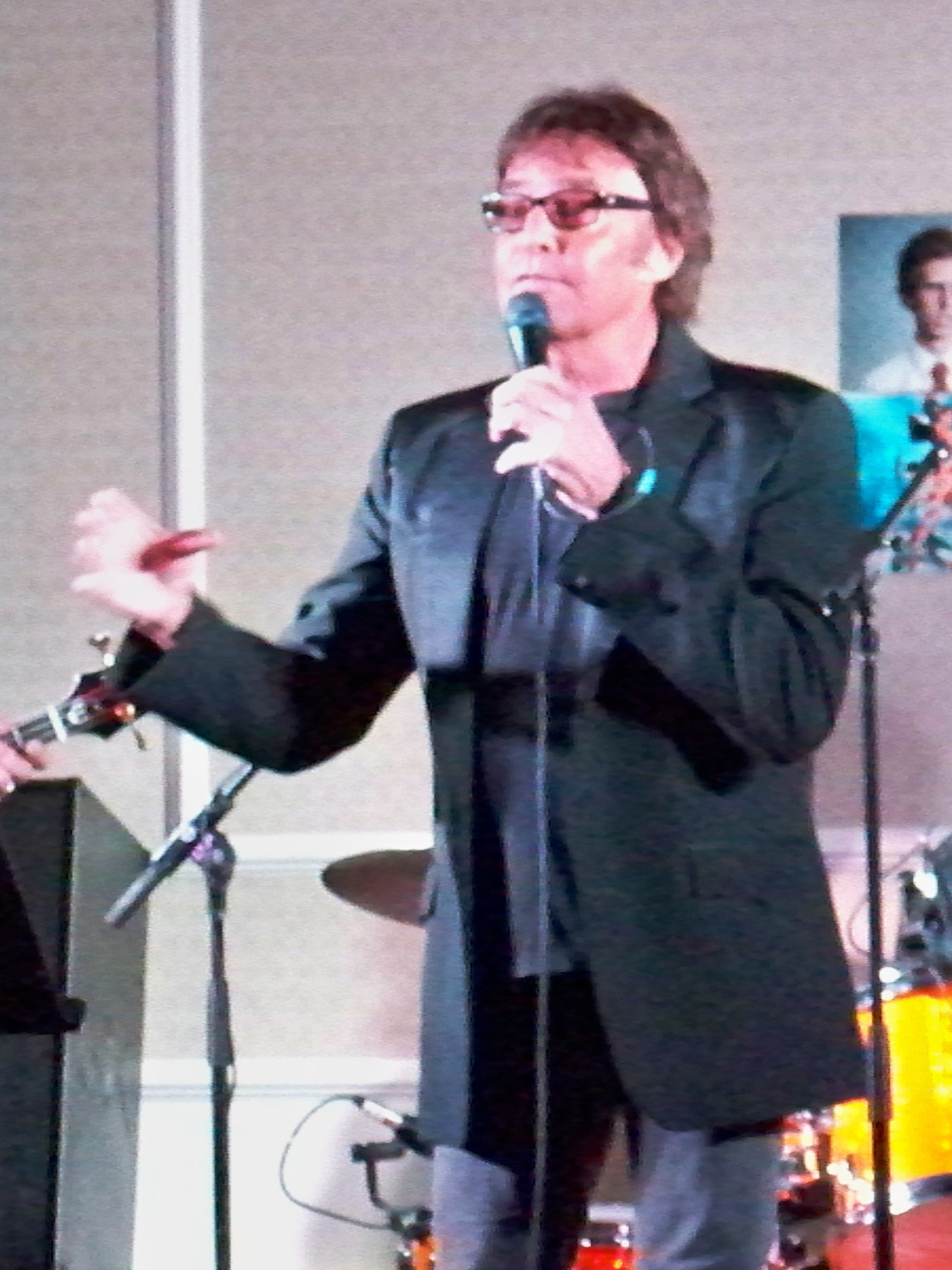
Lindsay performing in 2013

Lindsay continued to record solo singles for a few years (for Warner Bros., Elka and Greedy Records) before retiring from performing to serve as head of A&R for United Artists Records. He contributed to the work of Gerry Rafferty ("Baker Street"), Kenny Rogers, and others. He also composed commercial jingles for Baskin-Robbins, Datsun (Nissan), Kodak, Pontiac, and Levi's, and Yamaha, which used the music from his "Silver Bird" as the background to one of its commercials. He also composed music for the movies For Pete's Sake and The Love Machine, sung by Barbra Streisand and Dionne Warwick, respectively, and for a 1982 documentary, The Killing of America, as well as a song for the movie Savage Streets. In 1980 he dubbed a voice and co-wrote the musical score (with W. Michael Lewis) for the American version of the Japanese movie Shogun Assassin.

Lindsay made some appearances in 1985 in conjunction with the centennial of the Statue of Liberty, the Legends for Liberty tour (backed by the sixties rock band Spirit), and began to tour on his own again. In 1989 he quietly began recording at Kiva Studios (now House of Blues Studios of Memphis) in Memphis, Tennessee, with friend Michael Bradley. Although the album Looking for Shelter was not picked up for national release, Lindsay sold it through his website in 2003. In the early nineties he met the group, The Chesterfield Kings in Rochester, New York, on one of his tours, and later collaborated with them, performing on their recording of "Where Do We Go From Here?" He also appeared in a cameo in their film, Where is the Chesterfield King? (2000).

Lindsay's next official solo release was Video Dreams in 1996. This effort was warmly received and Lindsay began an even more aggressive touring schedule. Video Dreams had originally started as a duet album with Carla Olson. Lindsay previously dueted with Olson on "Ups and Downs", included on her 1994 album Reap The Whirlwind. Olson co-produced the original sessions with Lindsay and brought in Danny Federici and Eric Johnson, as well as songs written by two friends of hers, Scott Kempner of the Del Lords and Michael Nold. A disagreement about the album's direction led to the album becoming a solo album by Lindsay, though the song selection remained the same, with only one song added that had not originally been recorded with Olson. He followed this release with a holiday record (Twas the Night Before Christmas (2000)) and Live at Rick's Cafe (1999) (not a live album, but a collection of pre-rock standards).

In 2003, he had announced he would retire from touring, but he later reconsidered. A recording of his first "farewell" show was released in 2004 (The Last Midnight Ride). He currently does some touring, but as of January 7, 2006, he was heard on a webcast every Saturday night on the website of KISN radio from 7 p.m. to 12 a.m. PST, titled "Mark After Dark." On November 11, 2006, "Mark After Dark" switched to FM webcast "K-Hits 106-7" KLTH Saturday nights 7 p.m. to 11 p.m. PST. On March 10, 2007, the program "Mark After Dark" changed its name to "Mark Lindsay's Rock & Roll Cafe" to refer to Lindsay's restaurant, which opened to the public in Portland, Oregon, on August 27, 2007. The restaurant included a remote studio where Lindsay conducted his radio show in front of restaurant guests and can be seen from the street and sidewalk. The studio was also used at times by other K-Hits air personalities. On September 21, 2007, a federal lawsuit was filed against the new restaurant for the restaurant's allegedly unauthorized use of various trademarks owned by the Yaw family, who had operated Yaw's Top Notch Restaurants in the Portland area for many years. On May 12, 2008, "Mark Lindsay's Rock & Roll Cafe" announced its closure. Lindsay's recording of Treat Her Right with Los Straitjackets in 2001 was cited by Stephen King in his column for Entertainment Weekly in May 2008: "This remake of Roy Head's 1965 soul hit smokes. And Mark Lindsay sounds so good you just gotta wonder where he was all those years." During the summers of 2010–2013, Lindsay had a heavy touring schedule throughout the U.S. as part of the Happy Together: 25th Anniversary Tour, along with Flo & Eddie of the Turtles, the Grass Roots, the Buckinghams, and 'Monkees' member Micky Dolenz (2010 and 2013 only). In 2013, Lindsay recorded an album of new material on Bongo Boy Records entitled Life Out Loud. Lindsay was on the national tour of the "Happy Together" tours of 2015, 2016, and 2018.

In 2022, Lindsay began hosting a show on SiriusXM's Underground Garage channel, called Mark Lindsay's American Revolution. He is scheduled to participate in the Underground Garage cruise in May 2025.

== Personal life ==
Lindsay married his second wife, Deborah (née Brandt), on July 29, 1989, in McCall, Idaho, after his first marriage to Jaime Zygon ended in the early 1980s. He has resided in Machias, Maine.

== Discography ==
=== With Paul Revere & the Raiders ===
==== Studio albums ====
Year	Album details
1961	Like, Long Hair
1963	Paul Revere & the Raiders
1965	Here They Come!
1966	Just Like Us!
1966	Midnight Ride
1966	The Spirit of '67
1967	Revolution!
1967	A Christmas Present ... And Past
1968	Goin' to Memphis
1968	Something Happening
1969	Hard 'N' Heavy (with Marshmallow)
1969	Alias Pink Puzz
1970	Collage
1971	Indian Reservation
1972	Country Wine

==== Singles ====
Year	Song titles
1960	"Beatnik Sticks" b/w "Orbit (The Spy)" (Non-LP track)
1961	"Paul Revere's Ride" b/w "Unfinished Fifth"
1961	"Like, Long Hair" b/w "Sharon" (Non-LP track)
1961	"Like Charleston" b/w "Midnite Ride"
1961	"All Night Long" b/w "Groovey"
1962	"Like Bluegrass" b/w "Leatherneck"
1962	"Shake It Up – Part 1" b/w "Shake It Up – Part 2"
1962	"Tall Cool One" b/w "Road Runner"
1963	"So Fine" b/w "Blues Stay Away"
1963	"Louie Louie" b/w "Night Train" (from Just Like Us!)
1964	"Louie Go Home" b/w "Have Love, Will Travel"
1964	"Over You" b/w "Swim"
1964	"Ooh Poo Pah Doo" b/w "Sometimes"
1965	"Steppin' Out" b/w "Blue Fox" (Non-Lp track)
1965	"Just Like Me" b/w "B.F.D.R.F. Blues" (Non-Lp track)
1966	"Kicks" b/w "Shake It Up" (Non-Lp track)
1966	"Hungry" b/w "There She Goes" (from Midnight Ride)
1966	"The Great Airplane Strike" b/w "In My Community"
1966	"Good Thing" b/w "Undecided Man"
1967	"Ups and Downs" b/w "Leslie" (from Revolution!)
1967	"Him or Me – What's It Gonna Be?" b/w "Legend Of Paul Revere" (from Greatest Hits)
1967	"I Had A Dream" b/w "Upon Your Leaving"
1967	"Peace Of Mind" / "Do Unto Others"
1967	"Rain, Sleet, Snow" b/w "Brotherly Love" Cancelled single
1968	"Too Much Talk" b/w "Happening '68"
1968	"Don't Take It So Hard" b/w "Observation From Flight 285 (In 3/4 Time)"
1968	"Cinderella Sunshine" b/w "Theme From It's Happening" (Non-Lp track)
1969	"Mr. Sun, Mr. Moon" b/w "Without You"
1969	"Let Me" b/w "I Don't Know"
1969	"We Gotta All Get Together" b/w "Frankfort Side Street" (from Alias Pink Puzz)
1970	"Just Seventeen" b/w "Sorceress With Blue Eyes"
1970	"Gone Movin' On" (re-recorded version of Lp track from Revolution!) b/w "Interlude (To Be Forgotten)"
1971	"Indian Reservation (The Lament of the Cherokee Reservation Indian)" b/w "Terry's Tune" (Non-Lp track)
1971	"Birds of a Feather" b/w "The Turkey"
1972	"Country Wine" b/w "It's So Hard Getting Up Today" (Non-Lp track)
1972	"Powder Blue Mercedes Queen" b/w "Golden Girls Sometimes"
1972	"Song Seller" b/w "A Simple Song"
1973	"Love Music" b/w "Goodbye No. 9"
1974	"All Over You" b/w "Seaboard Line Boogie"
1975	"Your Love (Is The Only Love)" b/w "Gonna Have A Good Time"

=== Solo ===
==== Albums ====
- Arizona (Columbia) February 1970, US 36
- Silverbird (Columbia) October 1970, US 82
- You've Got A Friend (Columbia) November 1971, US 180
- Shogun Assassin (soundtrack) (w/ Michael Lewis)(import) 1980
- The Best of Mark Lindsay (Columbia) 1984
- Looking for Shelter (marklindsaysounds.com) 1989; 2003
- Video Dreams (alala music) 1996 This album was originally a duet project with Carla Olson. Rumors of an eventual release of the Carla / Mark version of the album known as Revenge continue.
- Live at Rick's Cafe (alala music) 1999
- 'Twas the Night Before Christmas (alala music) 2000
- The Last Midnight Ride (marklindsaysounds.com) 2004
- Mark Lindsay: The Complete Columbia Singles (Real Gone Music) 2012
- Like Nothing That You've Seen – Single (Bongo Boy Records) 2013
- Show Me The Love – Single (Bongo Boy Records) 2013
- Life Out Loud (Bongo Boy Records) 2013
- Love Is Strange - Lindsay Cowsill (Northern Tides Music) 2016

==== Singles ====
- "First Hymn from Grand Terrace" (Columbia) 1969, US BB 81, US AC 24
- "Arizona" (Columbia) 1969, US BB 10, US AC 16, RIAA Gold
- "Miss America" (Columbia) 1970, US BB 44, US AC 20
- "Silver Bird" (Columbia) 1970, US BB 25, US AC 7
- "And the Grass Won't Pay No Mind" (Columbia) 1970, US BB 44, US AC 5; Canada RPM 34, AC 14
- "Problem Child" (Columbia) 1971, US BB 80, US AC 35
- "Been Too Long on the Road" (Columbia) 1971, US BB 98
- "Are You Old Enough" (Columbia) 1971, US BB 87
- "Something Big" (Columbia) 1972, US AC 36
- "Photograph" (Columbia) 1975, US RW 113
- "Sing Your Own Song" (Greedy) 1976, US CB 103, US AC 22

== Production credits ==
=== Singles ===
- "Tighter"/"Young Enough to Cry" (1967), Marlin – The Unknowns, single
- "Birds of a Feather"/"To Know Her is to Love Her" (1969), Columbia Records – single/Keith Allison
- "First Hymn from Grand Terrace" (1969), Columbia Records
- "Everybody"/"Wednesday's Child" (1969), Columbia Records – single/Keith Allison
- "Arizona" (1970), Columbia Records
- "Miss America"/"Small Town Woman" (1970), Columbia Records
- "Silver Bird" (1970), Columbia Records
- "And the Grass Won't Pay No Mind" (1970), Columbia Records
- "Song Seller"/"A Simple Song" (1972), Columbia Records – The Raiders, single
- "Love Music"/"Goodbye No. 9" (1973), Columbia Records – The Raiders, single
- "(If I Had it to Do All Over Again, I'd Do It) All Over You"/"Seaboard Line Boogie" (1974), CBS – The Raiders
- "Sing Your Own Song" (1976), Greedy – Mark Lindsay, single w/Perry Botkin, Jr.
- "Oklahoma"/"Oklahoma" (1977), Capitol Records – w/Terry Melcher
- "Sing Me High (Sing Me Low)"/"Flips-Eyed" (1977), Warner Bros. – Mark Lindsay, single
- "Little Ladies of the Night"/"Flips-Eyed" (1977), Warner Bros. Records – Mark Lindsay, single
- "Tobacco Road" (1977), United Artists – Ritchie Lecea, exec. producer, single
- "Theme from Mork and Mindy"/"Disco Kicks" (1979), Ariola – Cake, w/Perry Botkin, Jr., single
- "Disco Kicks" (1981), J & D – The Original Mass, w/Perry Botkin, Jr., 12-inch single

=== Albums ===
- Something Happening (1968), Columbia Records – Paul Revere & the Raiders
- Hard 'N' Heavy (with Marshmallow) (1969), Columbia Records - Paul Revere & the Raiders
- Alias Pink Puzz (1969), Columbia Records – Paul Revere & the Raiders
- Games People Play (1969), Columbia Records – Freddy Weller
- Listen to the Young Folks (1970), Columbia Records – Freddy Weller, 3 tracks
- Collage (1970), Columbia Records – The Raiders
- Indian Reservation (1971), Columbia Records – The Raiders
- You've Got a Friend (1971), Columbia Records – Mark Lindsay, all but two tracks
- Country Wine (1972), Columbia Records – The Raiders
- Boy from New York City (1979), United Artists – Michael Christian, w/Perry Botkin, Jr.
- Lifeline (1979), United Artists – Paul Balfour, w/Perry Botkin, Jr.
- Shogun Assassin Soundtrack (1980), Toshiba – Wonderland Philharmonic
- unreleased Paul Revere & the Raiders album w/vocalist Michael Bradley (1982)
- Looking for Shelter (1990), marklindsaysounds.com – Mark Lindsay, w/Michael Bradley
- Video Dreams (1996), alala – Mark Lindsay
- Live at Rick's Cafe (1999), alala – Mark Lindsay, w/W. Michael Lewis
- 'Twas the Night Before Christmas (2000), marklindsaysounds.com – Mark Lindsay, w/W. Michael Lewis
- The Last Midnight Ride (2004), marklindsaysounds.com – Mark Lindsay

== Filmography ==
- Shogun Assassin (1980)
- The Killing of America (1982)
