= Birds of a Feather (Joe South song) =

Song by Joe South

Single by Joe South

from the album Introspect
- B-side: "These Are Not My People"
- Released: January 1968; July 1969 (re-release)
- Genre: Pop
- Label: Capitol Records
- Songwriter: Joe South

Joe South singles chronology
"You're the Reason" (1961)	"Birds of a Feather" (1968)	"Games People Play" (1969)

"Birds of a Feather" is a 1968 song by Joe South from his first LP, Introspect. It initially became a minor hit in the U.S., reaching #106 on Billboard.

South again included "Birds of a Feather" on his second album, Games People Play. It was re-released as a single and re-charted, reaching #96 during the summer of 1969.

Coincident with the release of the Raiders' Top 40 cover, South's original was placed on his fourth album from 1971, Joe South.

== The Raiders cover ==
"Birds of a Feather"

Single by The Raiders

from the album Indian Reservation
- B-side: "The Turkey"
- Released: August 1971
- Genre: Country pop
- Label: Columbia Records
- Songwriter: Joe South
- Producer: Mark Lindsay

The Raiders singles chronology
"Indian Reservation (The Lament of the Cherokee Reservation Indian)" (1971)	"Birds of a Feather" (1971)	"Country Wine" (1972)

The Raiders covered "Birds of a Feather" in 1971 on their album Indian Reservation.

Mark Lindsay is both the producer as well as lead singer on the song.

The Raiders' rendition reached #23 on the U.S. Billboard Hot 100 and #10 in Canada in the fall of that year. It also peaked at #11 on the U.S. Adult Contemporary chart. It became the group's final Top 40 hit.

== Chart history ==
Joe South original

Chart (1968)	Peak position
U.S. Billboard Bubbling Under the Hot 100	106
U.S. Cash Box Top 100	94

Chart (1969)	Peak position
U.S. Billboard Hot 100	96

Raiders cover

Chart (1971)	Peak position
Canada RPM Top Singles	10
U.S. Billboard Hot 100	23
U.S. Billboard Adult Contemporary	11
U.S. Cash Box Top 100	13
