= Goin' to Memphis =

Studio album by Paul Revere & the Raiders
- Released: 1968
- Recorded: American Sound Studio, Memphis, Tennessee
- Genres: R&B; pop-soul
- Label: Columbia
- Producers: Terry Melcher, Chips Moman

Paul Revere & the Raiders chronology
Revolution! (1967)	Goin' to Memphis (1968)	Something Happening (1968)

Goin' to Memphis is the eighth studio album by American rock band Paul Revere & the Raiders. Produced by Chips Moman, with the exception of one song ("Peace of Mind") that was produced by Terry Melcher, the album was released in 1968 and reached number 61 on the U.S. albums chart.

== Composition and reception ==
Professional ratings
Review scores
Source	Rating
Allmusic	2.5/5 stars

. Lindsay composed six of the album's twelve songs, as well as co-writing a seventh, plus was the sole composer of two additional songs that later appeared as bonus tracks. Chips Moman would not produce the album unless he could use his house band, which was also credited. With the exception of "Peace of Mind", all songs were co-arranged by Chips Moman and Mark Lindsay.

Goin' to Memphis was the final Raiders album to involve longtime producer Terry Melcher, who terminated his involvement with the band after its completion. Released in 1968, it was the last album by the group to be released in both mono and stereo as all record companies were phasing out mono LPs that year. The album peaked at number 61 on the Billboard 200 albums chart.

In a 1968 review, Billboard wrote that Memphis soul was a "natural fit" for the band, having "always had soul elements in its style." Allmusic's Bruce Eder called the album "a serious departure, without a trace of the garage punk or pop-psychedelia sound of their earlier albums, but it was also a reasonably successful one." He described Lindsay's vocals as "astonishingly strong and gritty" and suggested that Goin' to Memphis may have influenced Lindsay to undertake a solo career.

This album was remastered and rereleased on February 1, 2000 by Sundazed Music with bonus tracks.

== Track listing ==
1. "Boogaloo Down Broadway" (Jesse James) — 2:37
2. "Every Man Needs a Woman" (Mark Lindsay) — 3:11
3. "My Way" (Mark Lindsay) — 2:30
4. "One Night Stand" (Mark Lindsay) — 2:31
5. "Soul Man" (Isaac Hayes, David Porter) — 2:30
6. "Love You So" (Mark Lindsay)— 3:28
7. "I Don't Want Nobody (To Lead Me On)" (Harold Thomas, Lee W. Jones, Jr.) — 2:24
8. "I'm a Loser Too" (Mark Lindsay) — 2:29
9. "No Sad Songs" (Darryl Carter) — 2:03
10. "Cry on My Shoulder" (Freddy Weller) — 2:19
11. "Peace of Mind" (Mark Lindsay, Terry Melcher) — 2:15
12. "Goin' to Memphis" (Mark Lindsay) — 2:44

== Sundazed Music 2000 Version ==
1. "Boogaloo Down Broadway" — 2:37
2. "Every Man Needs A Woman" — 3:11
3. "My Way" — 2:30
4. "One Night Stand" — 2:31
5. "Soul Man" — 2:30
6. "Love You So" — 3:28
7. "I Don't Want Nobody (To Lead Me On)" — 2:24
8. "I'm a Loser Too" — 2:29
9. "No Sad Songs" — 2:03
10. "Cry On My Shoulder" — 2:19
11. "Peace of Mind" — 2:15
12. "Goin' to Memphis" — 2:44
13. "Go Get It" (Mark Lindsay; Previously Unissued Bonus Track) - 2:25
14. "How Can I Help You" (Mark Lindsay; Previously Unissued Bonus Track) - 2:05
15. "Peace Of Mind" (Single Version Bonus Track) - 2:27

== Chart performance ==
Chart (1968)	Peak position
U.S. Billboard Top LPs	61
