= Mr. Sun, Mr. Moon =

Single by Paul Revere & the Raiders

from the album Hard 'N' Heavy (with Marshmallow)
- B-side: "Without You"
- Released: 14 January 1969
- Genre: Psychedelic pop; bubblegum pop
- Length: 2:29
- Label: Columbia
- Songwriter: Mark Lindsay
- Producer: Mark Lindsay

Paul Revere & the Raiders singles chronology
"Cinderella Sunshine" (1968)	"Mr. Sun, Mr. Moon" (1969)	"Let Me" (1969)

"Mr. Sun, Mr. Moon" is a song by the American rock band Paul Revere & the Raiders written by Mark Lindsay originally released as a single in 1969, then on the album Hard 'N' Heavy (with Marshmallow) later that year. The song peaked at number 18 on the Billboard Hot 100, number 15 on the Cash Box Top 100 Singles chart, and at number 8 on the RPM Top Singles chart.

The song was ranked by both Billboard and RPM as the number 95 song of 1969 on their year-end charts. The song was featured on the soundtrack album to Once Upon a Time in Hollywood.

== Chart performance ==
=== Weekly charts ===
Chart (1969)	Peak position
Canada Top Singles (RPM)	8
US Billboard Hot 100	18
US Cash Box Top 100	15

=== Year-end charts ===
Chart (1969)	Rank
Canada	95
US Billboard Hot 100	95
