= Hungry (Paul Revere & the Raiders song) =

Single by Paul Revere & the Raiders

from the album The Spirit of '67
- B-side: "There She Goes" (from Midnight Ride)
- Released: June 6, 1966
- Genre: Garage rock; pop rock
- Length: 2:58
- Label: Columbia
- Songwriters: Barry Mann, Cynthia Weil
- Producer: Terry Melcher

Paul Revere & the Raiders singles chronology
"Kicks" (1966)	"Hungry" (1966)	"The Great Airplane Strike" (1966)

"Hungry" is a 1966 hit single composed by the songwriting team of Barry Mann and Cynthia Weil, and performed by Paul Revere & the Raiders.

== Recording ==
In contrast with the Raiders' previous top 10 hit, the guitar-driven "Kicks", the single "Hungry" has bassist Phil Volk playing the main riff. The creation of the bass line in "Hungry" was complex. It required that the bass part be recorded 3 times, then overdubbed. The components had to be synchronized: first, a normal bass line. That was followed by a line that was an octave higher and the last track was recorded as a fuzz bass, which was created by turning up an amplifier full blast, as using bass pedals wasn't available in those years. The result was what author and Rolling Stone critic Dave Marsh calls, "...the center of the performance...a lethal bass line". Lead singer Mark Lindsay plays tambourine on the record.

== Chart performance ==
"Hungry" was recorded on the Columbia label, and the song reached No. 6 on the Billboard Hot 100 singles chart.

== Cover versions ==
- Sammy Hagar covered the song on his 1977 eponymous album.
- In 1979, Todd Tamanend Clark remade the tune on his We're Not Safe album.
- The Cramps covered the song during a 1977 session that was eventually released on 2026's Gravest Gravy.

== Use in other media ==
- The song was featured in Quentin Tarantino's film Once Upon a Time in Hollywood in 2019 and its soundtrack.
