= Here They Come! =

Studio album by Paul Revere & the Raiders
- Released: May 3, 1965
- Recorded: 1964–1965
- Genre: R&B
- Length: 34:27
- Label: Columbia
- Producer: Bruce Johnston, Terry Melcher

Paul Revere & the Raiders chronology
Paul Revere & The Raiders (1963)	Here They Come! (1965)	Just Like Us! (1966)

Professional ratings
Review scores
Source	Rating
AllMusic	3/5 stars

Here They Come! is the third studio album by American rock band Paul Revere & the Raiders and the group's first release on Columbia Records. It was released on May 3, 1965. The first side of the album, produced by Bruce Johnston, features cover songs that were recorded live. The second side was recorded in the studio and produced by Terry Melcher, who would arrange and produce the band's albums through 1967. Following its release, the band began appearing regularly on the 1960s television variety show Where the Action Is, gaining national exposure.

== Track listing ==
=== Side 1 ===
1. "You Can't Sit Down" (Dee Clark, Kal Mann, Cornell Muldrow) - 4:05
2. "Money (That's What I Want)" (Janie Bradford, Berry Gordy, Jr.) - 3:23
3. "Louie, Louie" (Richard Berry) - 2:48
4. "Do You Love Me" (Berry Gordy, Jr.) - 4:00
5. "Big Boy Pete" (Harris, Terry) - 2:40
6. "Ooh Poo Pah Doo" (Jessie Hill) - 3:12

=== Side 2 ===
1. "Sometimes" (Thomasson) - 2:28
2. "Gone" (Johnston, Melcher) - 1:48
3. "Bad Times" (Steve Barri, P. F. Sloan) - 2:34
4. "Fever" (John Davenport, Eddie Cooley) - 2:52
5. "Time Is on My Side" (Norman Meade) - 2:30
6. "A Kiss To Remember You By" (Lindsay, Revere) - 2:07

=== Bonus Tracks (2016 Japanese Reissue - Oldays ODR 6335) ===
1. "Night Train" (Jimmy Forrest, Lewis P. Simpkins, Oscar Washington)
2. "Louie, Go Home" (Lindsay, Revere)
3. "Have Love, Will Travel" (Richard Berry)
4. "Over You" (Allen Julian Orange, Clarence Toussaint)
5. "Swim" (Lindsay, Revere)

== Personnel ==
- Mark Lindsay – vocals, saxophone
- Paul Revere – keyboards
- Drake Levin – guitar
- Mike "Doc" Holliday - bass (Side 1)
- Phil "Fang" Volk – bass (Side 2)
- Mike "Smitty" Smith – drums
- Roger Hart - liner notes

== Chart history ==
Here They Come! spent 45 weeks on the Billboard 200, peaking at number 71.
