= Mike "Smitty" Smith =

Musical artist (1942-2001)

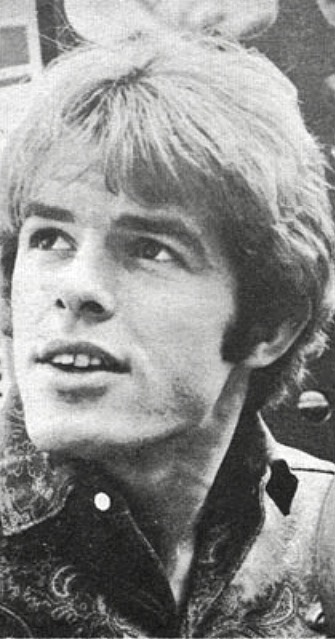
- Smith in 1967

Background information
- Born: Michael Leroy Smith; 27 March 1942; Portland, Oregon, United States
- Died: March 6, 2001 (aged 58) Kailua-Kona, Hawaii, United States
- Genres: Pop, rock
- Occupations: Singer, songwriter
- Instruments: Drums, guitar
- Years active: 1962–1972
- Labels: Columbia, RCA
- Formerly of: Paul Revere & the Raiders, Brotherhood, Friendsound

For the British broadcaster known as "Smitty", see Mike Smith (broadcaster).

Michael Leroy "Smitty" Smith (March 27, 1942 – March 6, 2001) was an American drummer, guitarist, singer, and songwriter. He is best known for his work as a drummer with Paul Revere & the Raiders.

== Early life ==
Mike Smith was born in Portland, Oregon to Howard and Mildred (Kugler) Smith. His father was a truck driver. He and his older brother Jerry grew up in neighboring Beaverton, and he graduated from Beaverton High School in 1960. Both brothers competed on their high school wrestling team. Smith received his first drum set at age ten.

== Career ==
=== The Headless Horseman ===
After high school, Smith became part-owner of Portland teen club The Headless Horseman along with two friends, Al Dardis and Ross Allemang. Smith and Allemang were members of the club's house band, the former playing guitar and the latter on bass. In 1962, Mark Lindsay and Paul Revere had relocated to Portland and were seeking musicians to complete their band. They visited the club, met Smith, and invited him to join as their drummer.

The Raiders signed on as the club's house band, ultimately sharing time with Gentlemen Jim and the Horsemen as their popularity and commitments elsewhere increased. It was during this time that Revere was first exposed to "Louie Louie" when a fan gave him a copy of the 1961 Wailers single. The 1963 Raiders recording featured Smith's "Grab yo woman, it's-a 'Louie Louie' time!" vocal intro.

=== Paul Revere & the Raiders ===
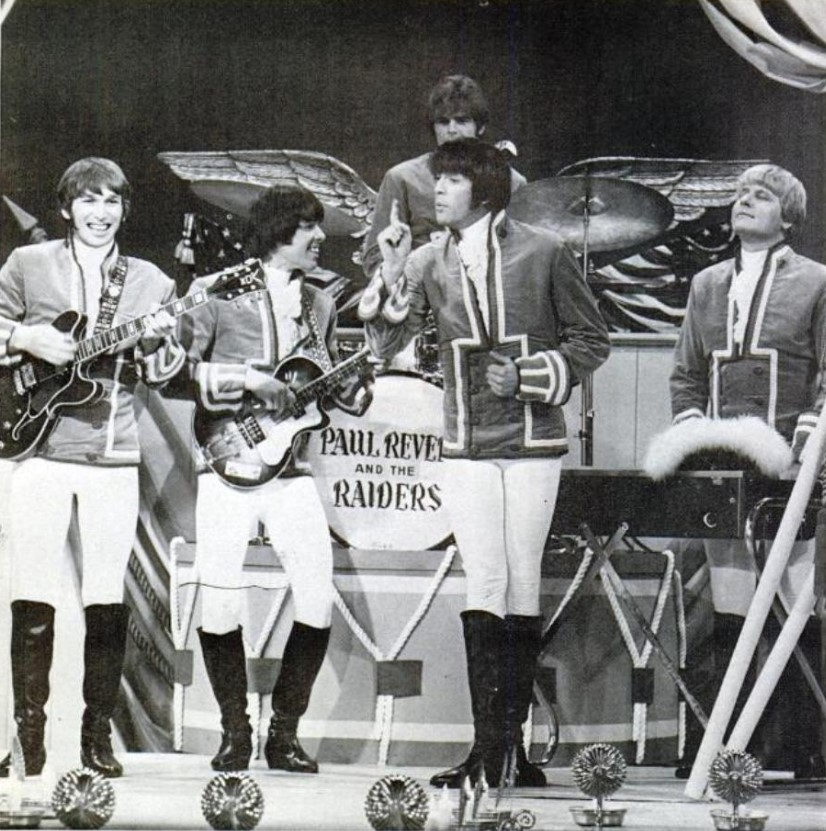
Smith drumming with Paul Revere & the Raiders

Smith was the drummer for Paul Revere & the Raiders from 1962 to 1967, and again from 1971 to 1972. The classic line-up of Revere, Lindsay, Smith, Levin, and Volk performed on some of their biggest hits, including "Just Like Me," "Hungry," and "Kicks." (Note: Some sources credit session drummer Hal Blaine for the studio drumming on the major Raiders hit recordings, but Mark Lindsay has confirmed that Smith was the drummer.) The group charted a multitude of singles during this period, and three of their albums were certified gold by the RIAA: Just Like Us!, Midnight Ride, and The Spirit of '67. Their 1967 compilation album Greatest Hits also achieved gold certification.

Christened the "mad little wizard", the "madcap jokester", and "the kookiest member of the group", he was noted for his "flair for comedy" and "outlandish sense of humor". Smith was an integral component of the group's performance style, a "carefree attitude" that "produced as much laughter as musical appreciation" with water fights and crazed drum solos.

He was a "powerful drummer" and a "strong, energetic player", but with "enough subtlety in his technique" to support the group's earlier R&B-focused dance music and their later garage and pop/rock phases. At the height of the group’s chart success and Where the Action Is media exposure, "Smith was, for a time in the United States, probably the most well-known drummer in rock & roll after Ringo Starr of the Beatles," and boasted his own fan club.

=== Brotherhood/Friendsound ===
After leaving Paul Revere & the Raiders in 1967, Smith and ex-Raiders Drake Levin and Phil Volk formed Brotherhood. Originally called Phil, Drake & Smitty, the trio became a quartet with the addition of organist Ron Collins.

The band was signed to RCA, but their progress was hindered by the members' lingering contractual obligations to Revere and Columbia. Multiple lawsuits had to be resolved over the course of 18 months before any music could be released. In the interim, Smith, Levin, and Volk did studio work for producer Terry Melcher and jammed with local musicians including Jimi Hendrix, David Crosby, and others. They also wrote and performed on two songs for Barry McGuire's 1968 album The World's Last Private Citizen.

The group was "interested in more complicated music ... interested in lyrics of real poetry and, perhaps, with a deeper message for today's youth". and wanted to "write our own tunes and connect with the culture of that day". Two albums were released, Brotherhood (1968) and Brotherhood Brotherhood (1969), plus two singles, "Jump Out The Window" (1968) and "Don't Let Go" (1969). Smith co-wrote, with Levin and Volk, all of the songs on the first album.

Another album, Joyride, was released in 1969 under the name Friendsound. Influenced by Cage, Stockhausen, and Zappa, the production was a "musical free-for-all … spontaneous jam session … eight-hands-at-the-control-board" creation using musique concrète and other experimental forms. Smith was listed as co-writer on all but one of the tracks and credited for playing drums, tambourine, celesta, shovel, and console. Joyride was included along with other experimental albums on the 1979 Nurse with Wound list of avant-garde music.

All three albums were rereleased by Real Gone Music on a 2014 CD compilation Brotherhood/Friendsong: The Complete Recordings.

=== Later events ===
Smith left Brotherhood after the Joyride album citing lifestyle conflicts and constant arguing. He rejoined the Raiders in 1971-1972 for the Indian Reservation and Country Wine albums and associated tours. After leaving the Raiders, he lived in Oregon and Hawaii and pursued various individual music projects.

The Raiders classic line-up (Revere, Lindsay, Smith, Levin, and Volk) reunited for Dick Clark's Good Ol' Days II special in 1978. Four of the group, minus Revere, reunited again for a 1997 concert in Portland.

On October 13, 2007, the entire group was inducted into the Oregon Music Hall of Fame.

== Discography ==
=== Paul Revere & the Raiders (1962-1967, 1971-1972) ===
- 1963: Paul Revere & the Raiders
- 1965: Here They Come!
- 1966: Just Like Us! (Note: Lead vocal on "I Know".)
- 1966: Midnight Ride (Note: Co-writer on "There's Always Tomorrow".)
- 1966: The Spirit of '67 (Note: Writer and lead vocal on "Our Candidate".)
- 1967: Revolution!
- 1967: Greatest Hits
- 1971: Indian Reservation
- 1972: Country Wine

=== Brotherhood/Friendsound ===
- 1968: Brotherhood (RCA LSP 4092) (Note: Co-writer on all 12 tracks.)
- 1969: Joyride (as Friendsound, RCA LSP 4114)) (Note: Co-writer on five of six tracks.) (Note: Some sources have Friend Sound as the group name.)
- 1969: Brotherhood Brotherhood (RCA LSP 4228) (Note: After his departure from Brotherhood, Smith was replaced by Joe Pollard for this album, but the change was not publicized. Ron Collins also departed and was replaced by Lee Michaels)
- 2014: Brotherhood/Friendsound: The Complete Recordings (Real Gone Music RGM 0220)

Discography notes

== Personal life ==
Smith married longtime girlfriend Susan Moore on June 7, 1963, in Stevenson, Washington. They had two children together, Rory and Alexandra.

He met his second wife, Brenda Hibbs, in Brookings, Oregon, while he was recovering from a car accident. They married in 1978 and had two children, Rio and Jenna, before divorcing in 1996.

Smith and girlfriend Mia Kiemele moved to Hawaii in 1997 where he enjoyed fishing, sailing, and hiking in addition to managing his business, Hot Lava Productions.

== Death ==
Smith died on March 6, 2001, in Kailua-Kona, Hawaii from natural causes after being found unconscious in his home. After cremation and a memorial service, his ashes were returned to Portland and subsequently scattered in Hawaii.
