= Just Like Us! =

Studio album by Paul Revere & the Raiders
- Released: January 3, 1966
- Genres: Rock, R&B
- Length: 30:17
- Label: Columbia
- Producer: Terry Melcher

Paul Revere & the Raiders chronology
| Here They Come! (1965) | Just Like Us! (1966) | Midnight Ride (1966) |

Professional ratings
Review scores
| Source | Rating |
|---|---|
| AllMusic | 4.5/5 stars |
| Rolling Stone | 2/5 stars |

Just Like Us! is the fourth studio album by American rock band Paul Revere & the Raiders. Produced by Terry Melcher and released on January 3, 1966, by Columbia Records, it featured the U.S. hit single "Just Like Me". Unlike their later albums, on which Mark Lindsay was the primary lead singer, the lead vocal duties on Just Like Us! were split among him and the other band members, guitarist Drake Levin, bassist Phil Volk, and drummer Mike Smith. This was their last album of cover songs; their next album Midnight Ride was mostly self-penned material.

== Release and reception ==
Just Like Us! was the band's first album to be released after they had started appearing regularly on the 1960s television variety show Where the Action Is. The LP peaked at number five on the Billboard 200 albums chart. It was certified gold by the Recording Industry Association of America (RIAA) on January 6, 1967. The cover art was taken from a Guy Webster photo session at Clark Gable's ranch in Encino, California.

This album was remastered and rereleased May 19, 1998 by Sundazed Music with extra tracks.

== Track listing ==
All songs sung by Mark Lindsay, except where noted

=== Side 1 ===
1. "Steppin' Out" — (Mark Lindsay, Paul Revere) - 2:13
2. "Doggone" (Marvin Tarplin, Smokey Robinson, Warren Moore) — 2:50
3. "Out of Sight" (Ted Wright)— 2:35 lead vocal: Drake Levin
4. "Baby, Please Don't Go" (Big Joe Williams) — 2:30 lead vocal: Phil Volk
5. "I Know" (Barbara George) — 2:30 lead vocal: Mike Smith
6. "Night Train" (Jimmy Forrest, Lewis P. Simpkins, Oscar Washington) — 2:30

=== Side 2 ===
1. "Just Like Me" (Richard Dey, Roger Hart) — 2:23
2. "Catch the Wind" (Donovan Leitch) — 2:00 lead vocal: Drake Levin
3. "(I Can't Get No) Satisfaction" (Mick Jagger, Keith Richards) — 3:18
4. "I'm Crying" (Alan Price, Eric Burdon)— 3:05 lead vocal: Phil Volk
5. "New Orleans" (Frank Guida, Joseph Royster)— 2:57 lead vocal: Paul Revere
6. "Action" (Steve Venet, Tommy Boyce) — 1:28 lead vocal: Group

=== Sundazed Records 1998 Version ===
1. "Steppin' Out" — 2:13
2. "Doggone" — 2:50
3. "Out of Sight" — 2:35
4. "Baby, Please Don't Go" — 2:30
5. "I Know" — 2:30
6. "Night Train" — 2:30
7. "Just Like Me" — 2:23
8. "Catch the Wind" — 2:00
9. "(I Can't Get No) Satisfaction" — 3:18
10. "I'm Crying" — 3:05
11. "New Orleans" — 2:57
12. "Action" — 1:28
13. "Ride Your Pony" (Naomi Neville) - 2:44 (Bonus track)
14. "Just Like Me" (R. Dey, R. Brown) - 2:34 (Bonus track)
15. "B.F.D.R.F. Blues" (R. Hart) - 5:07 (Bonus track)

== Personnel ==
- Mark Lindsay – vocals, saxophone
- Paul Revere – keyboards, vocals
- Drake Levin – guitar, vocals
- Phil "Fang" Volk – bass, vocals
- Mike "Smitty" Smith – drums, vocals

== Chart performance ==
| Chart (1966) | Peak position |
|---|---|
| U.S. Billboard 200 | 5 |
