= Drake Levin =

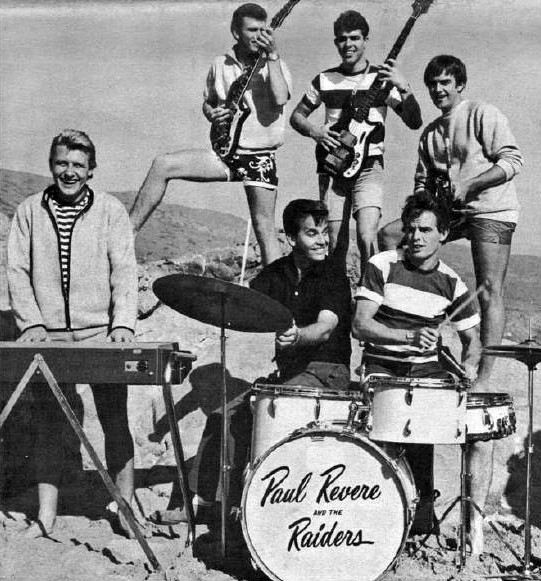
- Paul Revere and the Raiders in 1966, Front L–R: Paul Revere, Dick Clark and Mike Smith. Back L–R: Drake Levin, Phil Volk, and Mark Lindsay.

Background information
- Born: Drake Maxwell Levin; August 17, 1946; Chicago, Illinois, U.S.
- Died: July 4, 2009 (aged 62) San Francisco, California, U.S.
- Genres: Pop, Rock
- Occupations: Musician, singer
- Instruments: Guitar, vocals

Drake Maxwell Levin (August 17, 1946 – July 4, 2009) was an American musician best known as the guitarist for the pop-rock band Paul Revere & the Raiders.

== Early life ==
Levin was born in Chicago, and his family's name, Levinshefski, was shortened to Levin a few years before his birth.

== Paul Revere & the Raiders ==
Levin joined the Paul Revere & the Raiders, in 1963, when he was 16 years old, which earned him the nickname "The Kid" from Paul Revere. His addition helped establish Paul Revere and the Raiders as a premier showband in the Northwest United States. Levin's performances included synchronized dance steps, playing on his knees, standing on his amplifier and playing his guitar behind his head. After a performance at Seattle's Spanish Castle Ballroom, a young man who had watched from the front of the stage all evening approached Drake. He said that Drake's playing had inspired him and said he was a really good showman. As Drake thanked him and they shook hands, Drake asked the young man his name and he replied, "Jimi Hendrix."

The Raiders became a national teen sensation from their daily television exposure on the ABC television show Where The Action Is. It was during that time that Levin and the Raiders produced many hit records. Levin's blues-based guitar style helped drive the band's raw, edgy sound. Levin's synchronized dance steps and stage antics with fellow Raider bassist Phil "Fang" Volk earned the pair the nickname "The Twins". In 1966, Levin left the performing version of the band to fulfill his military service obligation by joining the National Guard. This enabled him to continue recording in the studio with the group during his time off. Levin's guitar work and background vocals can be heard on Raiders albums through The Spirit of '67, although his name and photo do not appear on the album cover with the band. Jim "Harpo" Valley had stepped into Levin's place on the Raiders' television and concert performances. Thus Valley's photo appears with the band on that particular album. Also in December 1966, he released "On the Road to Mexico" b/w "Glory Train" using the stylized moniker dRAKE. He retained the original family name Levinshefski for the writer's credit.

When Volk became ill and could not tour, Levin stepped in to cover for his friend on a few dates, filling in on bass. When Levin's performing replacement, Valley, decided to leave The Raiders after a little over a year with the group, Levin again stepped in to help the band finish its spring 1967 tour. Levin was to perform with the Raiders on the Ed Sullivan Show on April 30, 1967, but band leader Paul Revere was upset at the pending departure of Volk and drummer Mike "Smitty" Smith and believed Levin to be partially responsible. Unknown to the group, Revere had hired a replacement guitarist, Freddy Weller, to perform with the group on the Sullivan show, leaving Levin to watch the Raiders only Ed Sullivan Show performance as a spectator.

== Brotherhood ==
Volk and Smith left the band after the Sullivan performance and Levin re-teamed with them in Brotherhood. The band was signed to RCA, but were hindered by the members' lingering contractual obligations to Columbia Records from their Raiders work. The power trio released three albums, two under the Brotherhood name in 1968 and 1969 and a third album in 1969 called Joyride under the name Friendsound. Joyride was an experimental album that was included on the 1979 Nurse with Wound list. The cover art for this album was illustrated by Edna Marie O'Dowd. Ms. O'Dowd was an emerging artist and a friend of Drake Levin during the recording of the album.

== Guitars ==
Levin owned and played a triple-pickup Epiphone Crestwood Custom Deluxe in his early Raiders days, including the pilot episode of Where The Action Is. A few TV performances appearances of the band showed Drake playing a Mosrite six- and 12-string doubleneck that was offered to him from Mosrite, but he found it too heavy to play comfortably. He was also seen televised with a Vox Phantom VI, because of the band's Vox endorsement deal. However, he did not use them live or even in the studio as he thought they were poorly made instruments. Drake did use bandmate Phil Volk's 1960 Fender Stratocaster in the studio. In his later years, Levin played a reissue 62 Fender Stratocaster and a Fender Telecaster. However, he is most widely associated with his cherry red 1963 Epiphone Sheraton, with which he recorded his double-tracked guitar solo on "Just Like Me." After his death, it was purchased by the Musicians Hall of Fame in Nashville, Tennessee in early 2010, but it was severely damaged just a couple of months later in the May 2010 Nashville flood.

== Later career and death ==
Levin subsequently performed with artists such as Ananda Shankar, Emitt Rhodes, and Lee Michaels (on the album Barrel). He also participated in reunions of various ex-members of the Raiders, and worked with his friend Phil Volk on several occasions.

Drake Levin died of cancer July 4, 2009 at his home in San Francisco, with his wife Sandra at his side.

== Discography ==
=== With Paul Revere & the Raiders ===
==== Studio albums ====
| Year | Album details |
|---|---|
| 1963 | Paul Revere & the Raiders |
| 1965 | Here They Come! |
| 1966 | Just Like Us! |
| 1966 | Midnight Ride |
| 1966 | The Spirit of '67 |
| 1967 | Revolution! |

==== Singles ====
| Year | Song titles |
|---|---|
| 1963 | "So Fine" b/w "Blues Stay Away" |
| 1963 | "Louie Louie" b/w "Night Train" (from Just Like Us!) |
| 1964 | "Louie Go Home" b/w "Have Love, Will Travel" |
| 1964 | "Over You" b/w "Swim" |
| 1964 | "Ooh Poo Pah Doo" b/w "Sometimes" |
| 1965 | "Steppin' Out" b/w "Blue Fox" (Non-Lp track) |
| 1965 | "Just Like Me" b/w "B.F.D.R.F. Blues" (Non-Lp track) |
| 1966 | "Kicks" b/w "Shake It Up" (Non-Lp track) |
| 1966 | "Hungry" b/w "There She Goes" (from Midnight Ride) |
| 1966 | "The Great Airplane Strike" b/w "In My Community" |
| 1966 | "Good Thing" b/w "Undecided Man" |
| 1967 | "Ups and Downs" b/w "Leslie" (from Revolution!) |
| 1967 | "Him or Me – What's It Gonna Be?" b/w "Legend Of Paul Revere" (from Greatest Hits) |
| 1967 | "I Had A Dream" b/w "Upon Your Leaving" |
| 1967 | "Peace Of Mind" / "Do Unto Others" |
| 1967 | "Rain, Sleet, Snow" b/w "Brotherly Love" Cancelled single |
