= Joyride (Friendsound album) =

Studio album by Friendsound
- Released: April 1969
- Genre: Experimental; musique concrète; psychedelia; electronic; pop
- Length: 35:43
- Label: RCA Victor
- Producer: Friendsound

Brotherhood chronology
Brotherhood (1968)	Joyride (1969)	Brotherhood, Brotherhood (1969)

Joyride is the only album by Friendsound, an alias of the American rock band Brotherhood. Released by RCA Victor in April 1969, the album is an experimental project that originated when the group recorded a spontaneous jam session and "musical free-for-all" with their friends. The record explores an unsettling psychedelic style that features electronic music, musique concrète, spoken word, noisy guitar and other jarring sounds, and incorporates a studio control console as a musical instrument. One song, "Childsong", features a recording of band member Phil Volk singing as a young child. On release, the album was commercially unsuccessful, although critics praised the music. The album was re-released as part of the 2014 Brotherhood compilation The Complete Recordings.

== Recording and production ==
Joyride is effectively one of three albums by Brotherhood, a group formed by Phil Volk, Drake Levin and Mike "Smitty" Smith after they left Paul Revere & the Raiders in 1967. As with the group's other albums, it was recorded for RCA Victor, but was released under the nom de plume Friendsound. Described by Volk as a "kind of psychedelic adventure into Never-Never Land", on which the group "did some really bizarre things", Joyride built on the sonic experimentation of Brotherhood's 1968 eponymous album, which liberally employed sound effects. Dubbed an "aural portrait of the darker side of Los Angeles life", the album features six compositions rather than 'true' songs, with a generally unsettling nature – such as on "Love Sketch" or the lengthy, cacophonous "Lost Angel Proper St." – that brings irony to the album title. It was inspired by the Mothers of Invention's sprawling Uncle Meat (1969).

The record originated when the group recorded a "musical free-for-all" with their friends; they described it as their first "spontaneous jam session" as well as the first time they employed the studio's control console as a musical instrument. The title track and "Lost Angel Proper St." originate from the session, with flute, dialogue and sound effects overdubbed the following day, while "The Empire of Light", featuring organ, piano and console, was recorded in one take in the night. "Love Sketch" was intended an exercise in new recording techniques which "can be best heard on a true stereo player", while "Childhood's End" and "Childsong" are musique concrète exercises; the former resolves into "triumphant" guitar chords, while the latter is an electronic tone poem recorded at the Dixie Canyon School in San Fernando Valley and the 95th Street School in Los Angeles. In the liner notes, RCA, Ernie Altschuler, Joe Reisman were credited for encouraging Brotherhood to record the album.

Overall, Joyride employs noisy shards of guitar, ticking sounds, spoken word passages and "other jarring effects." The title track – credited to fifteen writers – is a one-chord sound collage "with organ, woodwinds, percussion, guitars and bass, punctuated by spoken interjections", while "Childsong", another sound collage, combines celesta, wind chimes and flute recorder with the sounds of children and Volk's childhood singing. The recording of the younger Volk is one of him singing the songs "On a Slow Boat to China" and "If You Call Everybody Darling", taped several months before his third birthday when his mother took him to a record cutter inside a trailer at a local carnival. He said he sang the songs "impeccably correct, both melody and lyrics", and credited the experience of hearing his voice played back to him with beginning his "musical journey ... with a bang." In a 1998 interview with Sundazed Music, he elaborated:

"We went to this school yard with a tape recorder and recorded children playing–once in an upscale suburban area, and then we went down to Watts to a black school ground. Then we merged them all together–laughing and jumping and playing their little games. We integrated them. That was our way of saying that all children are alike. Then we filtered in some of our spontaneous music, and right at the tail end of this ten minute piece, over the top, in this deep spacey echo, you hear this little song that I recorded when I was two and a half. It was almost like something John Cage would have done–musique concrete or music abstract."

Volk said that after receiving his test pressing for the album, he was playing "Childsong" when his mother walked in and heard the sampled refrain from his childhood recording, which made her start crying, a memory which he said "still manages to choke him up."

== Release and reception ==
Released by RCA Victor in April 1969, (Note: In their May 3, 1969 issue, Billboard included Joyride among a list of May 1969 releases, but noted that the contents included albums "which were issued during the past several weeks" and are instead "considered as part of the manufacturers' January release.") Joyride was commercially unsuccessful and did not chart. In a contemporary review, Lana Harvey of The Edmonton Journal highlighted Friendsound's "funny-peculiar name" and wrote that Joyride consists of musician friends having a "free-for-all" and "a spontaneous (to some degree) jam session," with the "not bad" control console of the recording studio being "utilized as a musical instrument." She praised the album, writing: "Friendsound took a few evenings of beautifully-created music, attached some groovy in-type names to the cuts, like 'Love Sketch', 'Lost Angel Proper St.', 'Childsong,' and a made a nice record. A really nice record." A pop reviewer for Australia's The Age described the album as the "absorbing" result of "overdubbing and multi-taping", and wrote: "Teeny-boppers will be wary of it, but experimental musique concrete, electronic exploration and a certain maturity make this an intriguing disc."

In 2014, Joyride was included alongside Brotherhood's other albums on the compilation The Complete Recordings, released by Real Gone Music. Dan Forte of Vintage Guitar wrote that despite the group's more pop-oriented origins, their music had become "almost purely experimental" by the time of Joyride, drawing attention to the fifteen songwriters credited for the title track. He wrote: "It's a travesty that it's taken 45 years for these albums to resurface and sad to think how much more recognition the late Levin's guitar playing deserved." In his review for The Second Disc, Joe Marchese described Joyride as "very ambitious," but commented that it "lacked the sheer musicality, scope and personality of Zappa's work of the time." Bob Stanley of Record Collector deemed it a "bonkers album".

Friendsound and Joyride were included on the Nurse with Wound list, an influential list of mostly obscure music which influenced the group Nurse with Wound. Psychedelic artist Plastic Crimewave included the album in a list of his favorite music for Dusted Magazine; while noting the confusion between the band name and the album title, he commented that the record as "actually a contract breaker for Paul Revere and the Raiders members, and what a heady one it is! Awesome layered jams that would make Sunburned Hand of the Man blush, and studio fuckery galore! There's even some musique concrete on here!! I recommend fungal enhancement." Julian Cope counted it among several "freak-out albums", alongside those by Amon Düül II, Hapshash and the Coloured Coat and Kalacakra's Crawling to Lhasa (1974), as a noticeable reference point for Karuna Khyal's Alomoni 1985 (1974). Reviewing Broadcast's Mother Is the Milky Way (2009) for Uncut, Jon Dale noted that as an "abstract patchwork", its "jump-cut logic" recalls "late-'60s psychsploitation gems" like Joyride and Andrew Loog Oldham's Gulliver's Travels (1969).

== Track listing ==
=== Side one (Friendsound I) ===
1. "Joyride" (John Barbata, Chris Brooks, Dave Burke, Nino Candido, Ron Collins, Kent Dunbar, Chris Ethridge, Tina Gancher, Buddha Blues, Drake Levin, Flip Mullen, Don Nelson, Mike Smith, Phil Volk, Danny Woody) – 4:15
2. "Childhood's End" (Collins, Levin, Smith, Volk) – 1:48
3. "Love Sketch" (Levin, Volk) – 3:26
4. "Childsong" (Levin, Smith, Nelson, Folk) – 6:12

=== Side two (Friendsound II) ===
5. "Lost Angel Proper St." (Collins, Levin, Nelson, Smith, Volk) – 9:22
6. "The Empire of Light" (Collins, Levin, Smith, Volk) – 9:40

== Personnel ==
Adapted from the liner notes of Joyride.

Friendsound

- Phil Volk – piano ("Joyride"), shovel ("Childhood's End"), bass ("Love Sketch"), prepared piano ("Love Sketch", "The Empire of Light"), celesta ("Childsong")
- Drake Levin – guitar ("Joyride", "Lost Angel Proper St."), console ("Childsong", "The Empire of Light")
- Michael Smith – drums ("Joyride", "Lost Angel Proper St."), tambourine ("Childhood's End"), shovel ("Childhood's End"), celesta ("Childsong"), console ("The Empire of Light")
- Ron Collins – organ ("Joyride", "Childhood's End", "Lost Angel Proper St.", "The Empire of Light")
- Friendsound – production, liner notes, chorus ("Joyride", "Lost Angel Proper St.")

Additional personnel

- Chris Ethridge – bass ("Joyride", "Lost Angel Proper St.")
- Dave Burkey – bass ("Joyride")
- Don Nelson – flute ("Joyride", "Love Sketch", "Lost Angel Proper St."), flute recorder ("Childsong"), saxophone ("Lost Angel Proper St.")
- Chris Brooks – guitar ("Joyride", "Love Sketch", "Lost Angel Proper St.")
- Nino Candido – guitar ("Joyride", "Lost Angel Proper St."), bass ("Lost Angel Proper St.")
- Jim Valentine – percussion ("Joyride"), console ("Lost Angel Proper St.")
- Kent Dunbar – percussion ("Joyride"), finger cymbals ("Lost Angel Proper St.")
- Jerry Cole – bass ("Childhood's End")
- Jim Gordon – drums ("Childhood's End")
- Grape Lemon – guitar ("Childhood's End"), piano ("Lost Angel Proper St.")
- Danny Woody – drums ("Love Sketch")
- 95th St. School – children ("Childsong")
- Dixie Canyon School – children ("Childsong")
- Camelia Pad – inspiration ("Lost Angel Proper St.")
- Buddha Blues – kinanda ("Lost Angel Proper St.")
- Tina Gancher – piano ("Lost Angel Proper St.")
- Edina O'Dowd – cover painting
