= Promises in the Dark =

Promises in the Dark may refer to:

- "Promises in the Dark" (song), a song by Pat Benatar
- Promises in the Dark (film), a 1979 American drama film
