= The Fabulous Chancellors =

Classic American rock 'n' roll band.

The Fabulous Chancellors is a classic American rock 'n' roll band founded in Boise, Idaho in 1959. Known for songs such as Diamond in the Sky, Hey Girl, and Blackout, the band has produced nearly 30 original recorded songs across six album collections. Founded by Tom Lowe and Dale Rich, the band later included Rich Crowley, Eddie Heuman, Phil Volk, Russ Bice, and Terry Call. The Chancellors became one of the most popular bands in the American Northwest.

== History ==
The Fabulous Chancellors were founded in 1959 by Tom Lowe and Dale Rich. Since then, they have worked with Brian Hyland, Paul Revere and The Raiders, Merrilee Rush, Mark Lindsay, The Tokens, The Turtles, The Byrds, The Diamonds, Gary Lewis and the Playboys, Gary Puckett, Bill Pinkey’s Original Drifters, Bill Hailey’s Original Comets and a number of others. The band's manager was Del Chapman, and notable personalities associated with the band include Phil Volk and Paul Revere. The Fabulous Chancellors released their "Anthology" CD in 2006, featuring original songs, tunes, and live performances from 1990 to 2006.

In May 2010, the band performed their arrangement of the National Anthem at the dedication of the Ada County Fallen Soldiers Memorial Monument in Boise, Idaho, with Governor Butch Otter officiating. Also in 2010, the band released their "Livin' on Rock n Roll" CD, which included two a cappella covers, "(Me and My Baby Like) Old Songs," and a new original song, "Your Love Ain't Easy." The Fabulous Chancellors released this album at a sold-out show at the Nampa Civic Center in Nampa, Idaho.

== Members ==
The Fabulous Chancellors have had more than 30 musicians as part of its fraternity since the band was formed in 1959 by original band leader Tom Lowe and Dale Rich.

- Ross Miller – vocals, guitar, bass
- Randy Steward – vocals, guitar, drums
- Jamie Jensen – vocals, keyboard, sax, electric violin
- Jake Ineck – vocals, guitar
- Stephen Baldassarre – vocals, drums, bass, audio tech

== Past Members ==
- Del Chapman - (Founding member manager)
- Tom Lowe - bass, vocals(Founding Member)
- Dale Rich - keyboards, vocals (Founding Member)
- Phil Volk - rhythm guitar, vocals(Founding Member)
- Eddy Heuman - saxophone, vocals(Founding Member)
- Rich Crowley - saxophone, vocals (Founding Member)
- Russ Bice - drums, vocals (Founding Member)
- Terry Call - guitar, vocals(Founding Member)
- Mike Fuehrer - Drums, vocals (founding member)
- Steve Eaton - keyboards, guitar, brass, Vocals
- Lou Matthews - bass,vocals
- Dr. Joseph Baldassarre - guitar, harmonica drums, woodwinds, vocals, music director
- Grant Green - drums, percussion
- Buster Dunn - Drums, vocals
- Alan Kuta - bass, vocals
- Scott McDonald - drums
- Larry Roberts - bass, vocals
- Monte Saxton - saxophone, congas, vocals
- Dennis Swindle - guitar, vocals
- Donnie Williams - drums
- Blair Crook - bass, trumpet, vocals
- Bruce DeVino - drums
- Tony Samuels - drums
- Charles Bauer - bass, vocals
- Dave Dineen - drums, vocals
- Dave Vaughn - drums, vocals
- Doug Bigelow - keyboards
- Doug Bradford - vocals
- Gary McCorkle - guitar, vocals
- Greg Hackett - drums. vocals
- Jon McKay - guitar, vocals
- Sam Rule - guitar, vocals
- Scott Guinn - vocals, harmonica

== Discography ==
The Fabulous Chancellors have released six album collections, featuring nearly 30 original songs.

Albums

- 1990: The Fabulous Chancellors
- 1995: Timeless
- 2011: Livin' On Rock 'N' Roll

Singles & EPs

- 1963: Blackout
- 1965: Hey Girl / Raindrops
- 1990: (Me and my Baby Like) Old Songs / I’m Cool
- 2025: Livin' on Rock and Roll

Compilations

- Collector's Edition 1959-1967
- Anthology 1990 - 2006
