= Fire and Ice (Pat Benatar song) =

Single by Pat Benatar

from the album Precious Time
- B-side: "Hard to Believe"
- Released: July 6, 1981
- Genre: Arena rock
- Length: 3:20
- Label: Chrysalis
- Songwriters: Pat Benatar, Tom Kelly, Scott Sheets
- Producers: Keith Olsen, Neil Giraldo

Pat Benatar singles chronology
"Treat Me Right" (1980)	"Fire and Ice" (1981)	"Promises in the Dark" (1981)

"Fire and Ice" is a song by Pat Benatar, released on July 6, 1981, as the lead single off her third album, Precious Time. The track was written by Benatar, Tom Kelly, and Scott Sheets. It peaked at #17 on the U.S. Billboard Hot 100 and peaked at #2 on the U.S. Mainstream Rock chart. The song also won Benatar her second Grammy award for Best Female Rock Performance in 1982.

== Critical reception ==
Record World said that "Benatar comes out rockin'" with "blistering guitars" and "vocal rage."

== Chart performance ==
Chart (1981)	Peak position
Australia (Kent Music Report)	30
Canada Top Singles (RPM)	4
New Zealand (Recorded Music NZ)	22
US Billboard Hot 100	17
US Top Tracks (Billboard)	2
