= Phil Volk =

American bassist (born 1945)

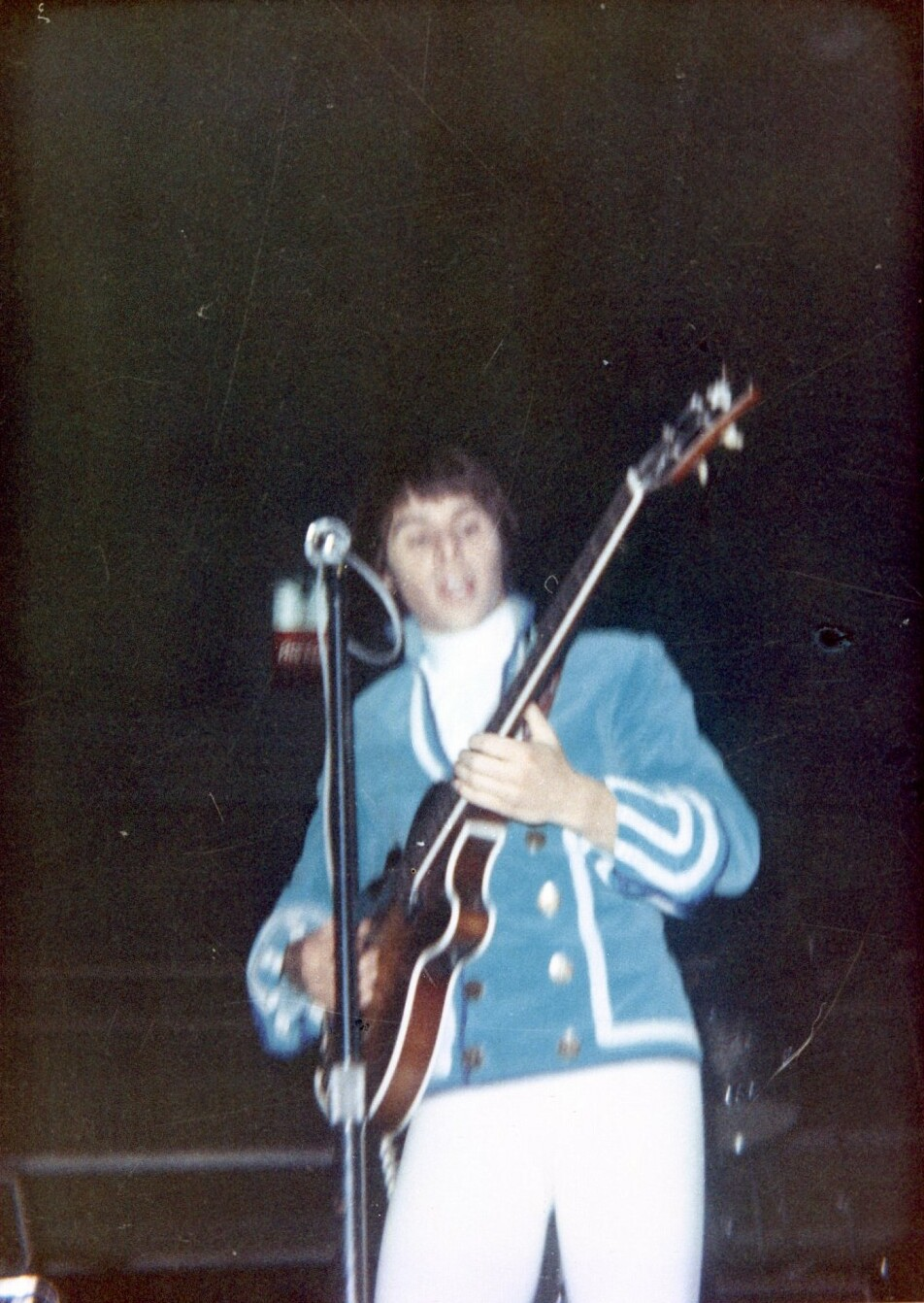
- Volk performing at Amarillo, Texas in 1966

Background information
- Also known as: Phil "Fang" Volk
- Born: Phillip Edward Volk; October 25, 1945 (age 80); Burbank, California, U.S.
- Origin: Nampa, Idaho, U.S.
- Genres: Pop, rock
- Occupations: Musician, songwriter, bandleader, record producer, arranger
- Instrument: Bass guitar
- Labels: Columbia, RCA, Sonic Wheel
- Formerly of: The Chancellors, Sir Winston's Trio, The Surfers, Paul Revere & the Raiders, The Brotherhood, The Great Crowd, Friendship Train, Phil Volk and Tina Mason Band, The American Rock All-Stars, Fang and the Gang, Fang with Family and Friends
- Website: www.philfangvolk.com

Phillip Edward Volk (born October 25, 1945) is an American musician. As the bassist of Paul Revere & the Raiders from 1965 to 1967, Volk appeared in over 750 television shows, 520 of which were episodes of the Dick Clark production, Where the Action Is, which aired daily from 1965 to 1967. The band themselves had 23 charted hits and 14 gold albums and Volk was a member of the band during the period of its greatest success. Volk's bass lines, as heard in songs such as "Hungry", "Just Like Me" and "Kicks", helped to revolutionize how the bass guitar was used in rock music. Volk was seen frequently in such fan magazines as 16 Magazine, popular during the 1960s.

On leaving The Raiders, Volk formed a new band called Brotherhood with Raider bandmates Drake Levin and Mike "Smitty" Smith. This band produced three albums for RCA that were not commercially successful. Following the breakup of Brotherhood, Volk had a stint as a bassist with Rick Nelson in the Stone Canyon Band, headed several groups of his own, toured the country in a rock-themed stage show, produced music for other artists, and started his own record label. He is currently making personal appearances with his new band "Phil 'Fang' Volk with Family and Friends".

== Early life ==
Phil Volk was born in Burbank, California to Anne-Marie "Mimi" Wagner Volk, a former singer, dancer, and actress and George Norbert Volk, an actor and businessman. His father taught acting at the Pasadena Playhouse and appeared in some films. Volk was one of seven siblings, including brothers George and Danny, and sisters Irene, Marilou, Christine, and Jeannie. When he was a young boy, the family moved to a farm in Nampa, Idaho, about 20 miles west of Boise.

Volk was encouraged to sing by his mother, Mimi. The first complete songs he learned were "On a Slow Boat to China" and "If You Call Everybody Darling" (the latter a hit for The Andrews Sisters). At the age of 3, he recorded these songs in a carnival trailer. His mother kept the recording, which Volk loved listening to as a child. Volk later used it in one of the cuts on the Friendsound Joyride album called, "Child Song". Volk took dance lessons and gymnastics. At the age of 13, Volk watched Elvis Presley on the Ed Sullivan Show. Excited by what he saw, he asked his parents for a guitar and they gave him one for Christmas. He learned to play his first song, "Teen Angel" on it, as well as some folk songs. He also imitated Little Richard and Buddy Holly.

At Nampa Junior High School, Volk met Drake Levin, who had moved from Chicago, in their 9th grade journalism class. At a noon dance in the school gym, the girls asked Volk to sing along with a recording of "Donna". While Levin and the girls loved the performance, many male students did not and threatened to "pants" Volk and cut off his hair after school. Levin helped him find a way out by allowing Volk to climb down a drainpipe from the second floor to escape to his father's car. The two boys were friends from that point on. At age 14, Levin came to visit at the Volk family farm, where he and Volk wrote their first song together. Levin came to live with the family for a time after his parents' marriage broke up. Levin stated that George Volk taught him some guitar licks while he lived there.

The first time Volk saw Paul Revere perform with his band was at a variety show at Nampa High School. His older siblings were already well-acquainted with the group, who always drew large crowds when performing at area dances and clubs. Volk was impressed with the energy and showmanship of the band. Shortly after, his family moved from Nampa to Boise.

While attending Borah High School in Boise, Volk ran track. At the Idaho State Track and Field Meet in the spring of 1963, he was on two first-place relay teams, helping set state records in the 440 and 880 yard relays. He was fired from the band he belonged to at the time, The Chancellors, for attending this meet instead of joining them for a gig. He also performed the role of Conrad Birdie in the school musical, Bye, Bye Birdie in 1962. Volk also ran for Student Body President, but lost in a close recount election.

Volk's parents left to live in Europe when Volk was 17. His father was now selling insurance to soldiers stationed overseas. Volk left Boise in September 1963 for college at the University of Colorado in Boulder, Colorado. Intending to be a music major, he studied classical music and opera. In the meantime, he kept playing guitar in a band in his fraternity.

== Early bands ==
The first band Volk joined was called The Classics. They formed in Nampa, Idaho at Nampa H.S. Volk played guitar and did some of the lead vocals. He remained with the band from 1960 to 1961. After the family moved to Boise in 1962, he joined The Chancellors with former Nampa H.S. classmate and former drummer for The Classics, Russ Bice. Volk again played rhythm guitar and did lead vocals. The Chancellors had a horn section and were a show band that also did instrumental songs. The band played the Fiesta Ballroom in Boise every Saturday night, taking turns with other local bands. These shows were well-attended by high-school aged teenagers from the Boise area. In 1963, Volk, as a member of the Borah H.S. track team, was scheduled to run in the Idaho State Track and Field Meet. Choosing to run in the meet, rather than go to a show The Chancellors were slated to play, cost him his spot with the band.

After his dismissal from The Chancellors, Levin invited Volk to join him in the band Sir Winston's Trio, a jazz-pop group, as guitarist/bassist. The band first played a place called Quinn's Lounge, but was quickly fired for being under-age. Following that disappointment, the band was asked to do a local television dance show in Boise. While in town, the trio decided to catch Paul Revere & the Raiders show at a dance club Revere owned called The Crazy Horse. Revere had seen the Sir Winston's Trio on the television show and asked if they would be interested in becoming the house band while the Raiders went back to Portland, Oregon, their new home base.

Revere insisted that the trio have a drummer if they were to play his club. Volk and Levin did not know of anyone that could join the group right away, so they asked Revere if they could borrow The Raiders' drummer, Mike 'Smitty' Smith, for the first week they played the club. Around this time, the band changed its name to The Surfers.

During the summer of 1963, The Surfers played the popular Miramar Ballroom in Boise and were given the opportunity to open for Paul Revere and the Raiders, who had recently signed with Columbia Records, at the Boise National Guard Armory. Their popularity soared with the addition of the choreography that Volk and Levin created for the band, including their "guitar battles" that involved intricate slashing movements with their guitars, all the while dancing and playing. They worked diligently on the choreography and their dance steps later became a big part of The Raiders show as well. Their most famous guitar battle came during the song "Big Boy Pete", which they later performed on The Tonight Show Starring Johnny Carson.

In August 1963, Revere auditioned Levin as a replacement for Charlie Coe, the Raiders lead guitarist. Levin, who had dropped out of high school, joined the band on the road. When Volk left for the University of Colorado on a scholarship in September 1963, the friends said goodbye at the Boise train station, not knowing that in little more than a year, Volk would also be joining The Raiders as the final piece in what would come to be considered the "classic" Raider line-up.

== Paul Revere & the Raiders ==
In January 1965, Levin recommended Volk to Paul Revere, who needed a replacement bass player for Mike "Doc" Holliday, who was leaving The Raiders for personal reasons. Levin convinced Volk to leave school and join the band on tour. Volk sent his parents a message overseas, informing them of his decision. By the time they received it, it was too late to stop him.

Volk joined the band in Las Vegas to perform at the Pussy Cat A-Go-Go nightclub. At the end of Volk's first concert appearance, lead singer Mark Lindsay "baptized" Volk with a jug of water, making him an official member of the Raiders. Since all band members had a nickname, Revere suggested Volk call himself "Bugs" or "Bucky Beaver", due to the prominent eye teeth he often displayed with a wide grin. Disliking both of those choices, he came up with the name 'Fang'. At one show, he decided to grab some electrical tape and spell out the word 'Fang' on the back of his bass. Volk flipped it over to display the name to the audience, all the while dancing and making faces behind Lindsay as he sang lead. It became a signature bit for Volk and the group.

The Raiders first Columbia album, Here They Come!, was released on May 3, 1965. The first side of the album, with Holliday playing bass, contained songs recorded live by producer Bruce Johnston. Volk played bass on the second side of the LP, which consisted of studio recordings produced by Terry Melcher. Volk was credited as the bass player on the back of the album. However, the group photo on the front cover still showed Holliday. The album remained on the charts for 45 weeks.

Recording with the band came easily for Volk, after long weeks of touring and getting to know the band's repertoire. Melcher used Volk's understanding of musical concepts, the result of his time as a music major in college, to assist in the studio when songs were being arranged. Volk could notate, understood chord structure, and knew how to write charts. In addition, Volk could play keyboards and Melcher often used him in that capacity. The first song on which the Raiders' new signature sound was evident was "Steppin' Out", written by Lindsay and Revere. Volk and Levin worked together on their guitar parts, with Levin coming up with a repeating lead line and Volk following with the same bass line that is played throughout the entire song. The song was the band's highest charted hit to date, peaking at #46 in August 1965.

The band's biggest break proved to be a huge one. On the basis of their popularity in the Northwest where they outdrew Dick Clark's touring show The Caravan of Stars, as well as because of Roger Hart's friendship with Clark, The Raiders were signed to be the house band on a new, daily show aimed at teenagers called Where the Action Is. The show was picked up by ABC and premiered on June 28, 1965. Volk has said the show helped give him his own following, as well as establishing him as a unique personality.

By 1966, according to manager Hart, Volk was receiving as much fan mail as lead vocalist Lindsay. The band also performed on many other television shows during Volk's tenure with the group, including Hullabaloo, The Ed Sullivan Show, The Smothers Brothers Comedy Hour, Colosseum, Milton Berle, Batman, The Tonight Show Starring Johnny Carson, and The Hollywood Palace.

=== Mainstream Success ===
After the success of Here They Come!, their television show appearances, and a national tour in the summer of 1965, the Raiders reentered the studio to work on their next album, Just Like Us!, released in January 1966. The album featured Volk's lead vocals on the cover of the Animals' "I'm Crying", and the blues classic "Baby, Please Don't Go". The latter proved to be popular with the fans even though it was never released as a single.

Just Like Us! peaked at #11 on the Billboard charts and became the group's first album to go gold. The album's second single, "Just Like Me", became the group's first national hit and featured a distinctive, double-tracked guitar solo performed by Levin. Not willing to lose the momentum the national exposure of their television show provided, the group quickly recorded and released Midnight Ride, the first album to contain song writing contributions from all five members of the band.

The single "Kicks" was the big hit from the album, reaching #4 on the Billboard charts. Volk and Levin co-wrote "Get It On" for the album, with Volk singing lead. Producer Terry Melcher also began placing Volk's bass line further forward in the band's recordings, resulting in the bass driving the arrangements. The follow up single "Hungry", recorded during the sessions for Midnight Ride but not included on the album, peaked at #6 on the Billboard charts and once again featured the bass part propelling the song. This stood in contrast to "Kicks" where Levin's lead guitar drives the song. The creation of the bass line in "Hungry" was complex. It required that the bass part be recorded 3 times, then overdubbed. The components had to be synchronized: first, a normal bass line. That was followed by a line that was an octave higher and the last track was recorded as a fuzz bass, which was created by turning up an amplifier full blast, as using bass pedals wasn't available in those years. The result was what author and Rolling Stone magazine critic Dave Marsh calls, "...the center of the performance...a lethal bass line".

In November 1966, The Raiders released their fourth Columbia album, The Spirit of '67, which proved to be the final Raider album to include work by all of the members of the "classic" Raider lineup. Volk wrote two songs on the album, "In My Community" and "Why, Why, Why (Is It So Hard)", singing lead on both. The single "The Great Airplane Strike"/"In My Community" preceded the release of the album. Melcher did not have complete confidence in "Airplane Strike" as the A-side, as it was unlike any Raider song before it, so the decision was made to put "In My Community" on the B-side, which could then be promoted if "Airplane Strike" failed. In addition to playing bass on "Community", Volk played rhythm guitar, with Levin on lead guitar, and a friend of Melcher's, Van Dyke Parks, contributing the organ part.

The next single, "Good Thing", which peaked at #4 in December 1966, was credited to the writing team of Melcher, Paul Revere and Mark Lindsay. Volk stated that the song was written at the Cielo Drive home of Melcher in the Beverly Glen section of Los Angeles. It was later to become infamous as the home where Sharon Tate was murdered by followers of Charles Manson. Some of the band members, including Volk, were spending a great deal of time there poring over ideas and jamming. Someone in the group said something like, "This is a good thing". After putting together some more lyrics with the others who were present and coming up with some chords for the song, Volk thought he would get partial writing credit along with Jim "Harpo" Valley, who was filling in while Levin was in the National Guard. But neither Volk nor Valley got any credit for helping to create the record.

Volk, Levin, and Smith were becoming disillusioned with the overall direction of the band. While songs like "Hungry" and "Good Thing" remained true to the band's garage band roots, Volk and the others believed songs like "Melody for an Unknown Girl" were not relatable to what was happening in the world of music at that time. Lindsay and Revere seemed to want to stay in the same musical groove, but the others wanted to play songs with a harder edge that were message-oriented. They made the decision to leave the Raiders to form their own band. In April 1967, just a week after his older brother, Army Captain George Francis Volk, was killed in Vietnam, Volk, Levin, and Smith flew to New York from Los Angeles to perform on The Ed Sullivan Show. Although Levin was present for the taping, Revere had already hired guitarist Freddy Weller as his replacement and Levin did not appear on the program. During rehearsals, Volk showed Weller the steps he and Levin had made famous and Levin worked with Weller on his guitar parts. The Raiders performed "Him or Me – What's It Gonna Be?", "Kicks", and "Ups and Downs". It was the last time Volk would appear as a regular member of the Raiders. Although Volk had already completed half of the next Raider album, Revolution!, he did not receive credit for his contributions.

== Brotherhood ==
In mid-1967, Volk, Levin, and Smith, along with organist Ron Collins, formed Brotherhood. However, the trio was being sued by both Columbia Records and Paul Revere which delayed RCA from releasing the group's first album, titled simply Brotherhood. By the time the legal situation was resolved, a full 18 months had passed.

The band simply did not have the music ready to go once the lawsuits were settled. All the songs on the album were jointly written by Volk, Levin, and Smith. On "Love for Free", the band used a pump organ to create a sound like a classical fugue at the beginning of the song as Volk's solo. After playing it for his father, who had made some criticisms about the sound of the organ, Volk went back to the studio and overdubbed the organ 8 times to get a bigger sound.

An engineer named Robert Moog set up a prototype of what he called a Moog Synthesizer in the RCA studios, where the album was recorded. It was used on 2 cuts, "Jump Out the Window" and "Forever". Ron Collins, the band's organist, didn't care for it much at first. He later said, "I think it has some potential". The album was given polish by the hiring of Norwegian studio engineer Eirik Wangberg. He worked on the songs, "Somebody" and "Doin' the Right Thing". Volk states that his proficiency at mixing and engineering helped create what followed on subsequent albums.

The band and its members often found themselves in the company of some of the best musicians and songwriters of the late 1960s, including Johnny Barbata, Buddy Miles, Jimi Hendrix, Harry Nilsson, Stephen Stills, Steve Winwood and Lee Michaels, who would gather at Drake Levin's home to jam. The second Brotherhood compilation, Friendsound's Joyride, borrows its feel from those jam sessions. The album, recorded in 1969 in the same studio where Frank Zappa recorded, is heavily influenced by him as well. On the album's cover, the album is described as "a musical free-for-all". Volk, Levin, and Smith are joined by friends and popular session musicians for a self-produced jam session. The group was known for this album by the name Friendsound and recorded six extended tracks. The album featured experimental uses of sound, extended jams, and dialogue. Volk incorporated the first recording he ever made as a child into the last song on side 1, "ChildSong", which also uses the voices and sounds of children playing in a park and school as part of the background.

Joyride sample
An audio sample of "Joyride" (title track of the 1969 album)

The final album, titled Brotherhood, Brotherhood, was released in 1969. This album was closer to straight out rock and roll and featured covers of several previously recorded songs, in addition to new songs by Volk and Levin. Among the covers, Volk says that John Phillips' "California Dreamin'" was recorded live in the studio by the band in 25 takes. Volk's favorite original song from the album is "Back Home Again" due to its a strong environmental message.

Brotherhood disbanded later in 1969. The internet has helped to spark a new interest in the band. A two-CD set titled Brotherhood: The Complete Recordings was released on February 4, 2014. The liner notes are extensively updated.

== Rick Nelson and the Stone Canyon Band ==
Volk had several connections to former teen idol Rick Nelson. Volk's mother Mimi was the massage therapist for Nelson's mother Harriet, and Nelson's uncle Don was manager of Brotherhood. Nelson came to see The Brotherhood at one of their performances at a release party and complimented Volk on his singing and musicianship. The two started to socialize. In December 1969, Volk joined the Stone Canyon Band as Nelson's bassist, replacing Randy Meisner. Volk toured with the band for 7 months, including a performance with the band on The Johnny Cash Show. Philosophical differences, particularly over drug use, which Volk had renounced after the break-up of Brotherhood, caused him to leave the band. However, Volk credits Nelson with teaching him some new styles of finger-picking on the guitar that Volk still uses today.

== Later Appearances ==
In 1970, at the request of Paul Revere, Volk briefly returned to the Raiders for four concert appearances as part of a tour with The Beach Boys. Revere was experimenting with having Freddy Weller and new bassist Keith Allison play lead and rhythm guitar, respectively. Volk took over playing bass for these concerts. In 1978, the Raiders' classic line-up reunited for a final time on a Dick Clark prime-time special titled The Good Ole' Days where the group performed a medley of their biggest hits. Four members of the classic line-up (excluding Revere) reunited in September 1997, performing before a crowd of over 10,000 fans.

There has long been a controversy related to whether or not session musicians were used on The Raiders hit albums during the years Volk appeared with the group. He says, "There were no studio cats. That must have happened later, maybe in the 1970s when Mark has turned up as producer and Terry Melcher left. I don't know, Mark brought some people in for "Indian Reservation (The Lament of the Cherokee Reservation Indian)", but when I was in the band, and I want to get this straight, I was the bass player, I sang background vocals, and I also sang some lead vocals on some of the songs, and it was Drake, and myself, and Smitty, and Paul on keyboards, and Mark played some saxophone. We were the players, because before becoming famous and national, we were on the dance circuit for a long time, playing up in the Northwest, and you know, we were known as the hardest workin' band in the Northwest, the hardest workin' band in show business. We would do a set of music at one of our dance gigs and our coats were soaking wet. We had to change outfits, because we had worked so hard on the set. So we were the players, and anyone who writes that we weren't doesn't know what they are talkin' about, they haven't done their homework". Volk also acknowledges that whenever session musicians were brought in by their producers, they were augmenting the band members, not replacing them.

== Equipment ==
The first guitar Volk played was a red, sunburst Harmony acoustic guitar, given to him by his parents for Christmas at age 13. His first bass was a Fender Precision, played with the Sir Winston's Trio. He had never played bass before, so he borrowed the keyboard player's bass and Volk and Drake Levin took turns learning to play it for the band.

When he joined Paul Revere & the Raiders, he was playing an Epiphone Newport bass. Shortly after, The Raiders were the first American band to be endorsed by Vox. The bass that Volk was given to play as part of the endorsement deal with Vox was the white Vox Phantom IV. However, Volk disliked the bass very much saying, "The neck was as big as a two by four. If you look at some pictures you'll see that I put a Fender Precision neck on it. I had to have it custom fitted into the slot where the neck goes. And sure enough, after doing that, I could play the thing, and it really had a good feel to it. If you go to Seattle and go to the EMP (Experience Music Project) Museum -- that bass is hanging there. And it has the Fender neck on it!"

Wanting a better bass, Volk went to a guitar store in Los Angeles to purchase one. A young girl, looking to sell a Fender '62 Jazz bass to the owner of the store, walked in. The store owner was not interested, but Volk was. She offered to sell the bass guitar to Volk for $200 but she was not prepared to sell it immediately, needing it for a gig that evening. Volk also had a recording session that evening and struck a deal that she immediately sell the guitar to him, and he would loan her a brand new VOX Phantom bass which he had in the trunk of his car. The girl was to return the VOX bass to Volk the next day. Money and guitars were exchanged, and in a recent interview Volk acknowledged that he "never saw her again." Volk went on to record several of The Raiders biggest hits with the Fender bass, including "Kicks", "Hungry" and "Good Thing". He purchased a Höfner Club bass, using it primarily for television appearances because it was lighter and easier to carry. He did not use it much in the studio, because producer Terry Melcher preferred how the Fender bass sounded in recordings. Volk was presented with one of only 50 numbered Höfner Club basses a few years ago in tribute to his helping to popularize the model.

The Raiders used Vox AC-100 amps and later Vox Super Beatle amps in performances. Volk and Levin often stood on the amps, playing behind their backs, and dancing on top of the amps, which each stood nearly 5 feet (1.5 m) tall. There were several instances when the bandmates fell off the amps, so eventually they required spotters on their crew to catch them if they did.

== Other musical associations ==
Following the end of his association with Rick Nelson, Volk went on to form a group called The Great Crowd. It consisted of 15 people, including a horn band and 4 female singers. They played at Disneyland and were recording on Lute Records. However, Volk's wife's former manager, who got them the job at Disneyland, asked them to scale back the number of group members.

The resulting band was called The Friendship Train and consisted of six members, to include Volk, his wife, former Capitol Records recording artist Tina Mason, and his sisters, Jeannie and Marilou. The group performed at Disneyland for 7 years. In the early 1980s, Volk and Mason toured with their own band, The Phil Volk and Tina Mason Band. The band broke up due to internal issues after a tour of the Northwest and Canada.

A Broadway-style show, created by Anita Mann, called "A Blast From the Past", was Volk's next gig. It featured songs from the rock and roll era and debuted in Las Vegas in 1986, where it played until 1993. In 1994–95, the show originated in Lake Tahoe, and finally moved to Hawaii in 1996. Volk, Levin, and Smith played several dates together following the 1997 Raider reunion, but when Smith moved to Hawaii, the group was unable to continue. Volk and two former Raiders, Drake Levin and Keith Allison, as well as former members of The Grass Roots and The Buckinghams, formed a group called The American Rock All-Stars. They performed at various venues from 1998 to 2002.

== Fang and the Gang ==
Volk's newest group is Fang and The Gang, with whom he recorded his latest album "Fang Reveres The Raiders", released in January 2005 on Sonic Wheel Records, his own label. The album consists of covers of all of The Raiders top 20 hits, plus Volk and the band revisit his own compositions for The Raiders, including "Why, Why, Why", "In My Community" and "Get It On". The album also includes covers of other artists' work, a new composition by Volk, and a Brotherhood song.

The band's latest project was a cover of the Bob Dylan classic, "The Times They Are a-Changin'". The idea for covering the song came out of Volk's desire to record a new album. He began by listening to old cds and perusing the catalogs of different artists. Volk is a long-time Dylan admirer and Dylan recorded at Columbia Records at the same time as the Raiders, but the two rarely crossed paths. The new version is harder rocking than the original. Volk calls it, "A Song for the World in Turmoil". It was coincidental to the message of the song that Osama bin Laden was killed on May 1, 2011, the same day the single was released.

Volk stated, "We all share the fragile, little planet. We all need to work together, like Lennon said, 'Come Together' and 'Imagine all the people, livin' life in peace'. You know, that's a bigger vision and it's not only a vision that a lot of people have had, but it's also on a scriptural basis, that the world would be a better place if we'd all get on the right path". There is a scriptural reference at the end of the song "Daniel 2:44", placed there as a personal message from Volk. The song was played at Ground Zero the day after bin Laden was killed, and received a warm response from the crowds gathered there.

In November 2020, Volk released a 2-CD set called "Rocker", comprising 39 songs and covering five decades of his career. The songs include some by guest artists and members of Volk's bands through the years. It includes original music as well as cover versions of some of Volk's favorite tunes by artists who influenced him over the course of his career.

== Awards ==
In 2007, Paul Revere and the Raiders were inducted into the Oregon Music Hall of Fame. Former Raiders Volk and Mark Lindsay were on hand for the induction ceremony and performed a medley of Raider hits at the show put on for the ceremony.

== Personal life ==
Volk married singer Tina Mason, whom he met on the set of Where the Action Is, on June 25, 1967.

They had four children, Christian, Kelly, Brian, and Jessica, and resided in Las Vegas, Nevada.

He and his wife were baptized as members of the Jehovah's Witnesses on July 17, 1970.

Tina Mason died on June 21, 2021, after 55 years together. Volk remarried to a woman named Yvonne on December 16, 2022.

Volk's uncle, character actor Jack Wagner, had a recurring role on The Adventures of Ozzie and Harriet as, "Jack, The Soda Jerk".

His sisters also had show business careers; Jeannie and Marilou were part of The Friendship Train with Volk and wife Tina Mason.

His sister Irene plays bass and sings in the Ralph Mathis Band. Mathis is the brother of singer Johnny Mathis.

Jeannie Snow is a vocalist with the Tommy Thompson Band in Las Vegas.

== Discography ==
=== With Paul Revere & the Raiders ===
==== Studio albums ====
Year	Album details
1965	Here They Come!
1966	Just Like Us!
1966	Midnight Ride
1966	The Spirit of '67
1967	Greatest Hits
1967	Revolution!

==== Singles ====
Year	Song titles
1965	"Steppin' Out" b/w "Blue Fox" (Non-Lp track)
1965	"Just Like Me" b/w "B.F.D.R.F. Blues" (Non-Lp track)
1966	"Kicks" b/w "Shake It Up" (Non-Lp track)
1966	"Hungry" b/w "There She Goes" (from Midnight Ride)
1966	"The Great Airplane Strike" b/w "In My Community"
1966	"Good Thing" b/w "Undecided Man"
1967	"Ups and Downs" b/w "Leslie" (from Revolution!)
1967	"Him or Me – What's It Gonna Be?" b/w "Legend Of Paul Revere" (from Greatest Hits)
1967	"I Had A Dream" b/w "Upon Your Leaving"
1967	"Rain, Sleet, Snow" b/w "Brotherly Love" Cancelled single
