= Crimes of Passion (Pat Benatar album) =

1980 studio album by Pat Benatar

Studio album by Pat Benatar
- Released: August 5, 1980
- Studios: Sound City (Van Nuys, California)
- Genres: Hard rock; pop rock
- Length: 37:35
- Label: Chrysalis
- Producer: Keith Olsen

Pat Benatar chronology
In the Heat of the Night (1979)	Crimes of Passion (1980)	Precious Time (1981)

Singles from Crimes of Passion
- 1. "You Better Run" Released: July 8, 1980; 2. "Hit Me with Your Best Shot" Released: September 15, 1980; 3. "Treat Me Right" Released: December 29, 1980

Crimes of Passion is the second studio album by American singer Pat Benatar, released on August 5, 1980, by Chrysalis Records. It is Benatar's first album to feature Myron Grombacher on drums, beginning a long tenure in her band that would last into the late 1990s.

The album debuted on the US Billboard 200 for the week ending August 23, 1980, and remaining at number two for five weeks in January 1981, behind John Lennon and Yoko Ono's Double Fantasy.

Crimes of Passion spawned three singles. "You Better Run" was the second music video ever aired on MTV in 1981, and peaked at number 42 in the US and New Zealand, as well as number 33 in Australia. "Hit Me with Your Best Shot", considered to be Benatar's best-known song, became her first top-10 entry in the US, and entered the top 40 in Australia. "Treat Me Right" became a top-20 entry in the US. The album also contains a cover of Kate Bush's "Wuthering Heights".

Crimes of Passion was critically well-received and became Benatar's best-selling album, having been certified four-times Platinum (for shipments in excess of over four million copies) in the United States and five-times Platinum (for shipments of 500,000 copies) in Canada. It placed at number five on Billboard magazine's 1981 year-end album chart. It peaked at number two in Canada and number six in New Zealand. It was also Benatar's highest-peaking album to that point in Australia (number 16) and her first album to chart in Sweden (number 27).

In 1981, Crimes of Passion earned Benatar her first Grammy Award for Best Female Rock Vocal Performance. The album was reissued and remastered on Capitol Records in 2006.

== Critical reception ==
Professional ratings
Review scores
Source	Rating
AllMusic	4.5/5 stars
The Encyclopedia of Popular Music	3/5 stars
MusicHound	4/5 stars
Rolling Stone	Mixed
(The New) Rolling Stone Album Guide	3/5 stars

Crimes of Passion was generally well-received. Billboard wrote in a 1980 review that the album "finds Benatar in an even more rock vein with her powerful yet sensuous vocals blazing a ferocious rock path" and called it "a most credible follow-up to Benatar's near-platinum debut." J.D. Considine, writing in (The New) Rolling Stone Album Guide, awarded the album 3 of 5 stars, saying that "Hell Is For Children" "proves [Benatar's] mettle as a writer" and offered praise for her vocals and the album's production. Eric Deggans, writing as part of MusicHound Rock: The Essential Album Guide, awarded the album 4 out of 5 stars, calling it one of Benatar's most consistent albums, and said that its singles such as "Hit Me With Your Best Shot" "cemented her reputation as a toughie with pipes of solid brass".

== Track listing ==
Side one
No.	Title	Writer(s)	Length
1.	"Treat Me Right"	Doug Lubahn; Pat Benatar	3:24
2.	"You Better Run" (The Young Rascals cover)	Felix Cavaliere; Eddie Brigati	3:02
3.	"Never Wanna Leave You"	Neil Giraldo; Benatar	3:13
4.	"Hit Me with Your Best Shot"	Eddie Schwartz	2:51
5.	"Hell is for Children"	Giraldo; Benatar; Roger Capps	4:48

Side two
No.	Title	Writer(s)	Length
6.	"Little Paradise"	Giraldo	3:32
7.	"I'm Gonna Follow You"	Billy Steinberg	4:28
8.	"Wuthering Heights" (Kate Bush cover)	Bush	4:28
9.	"Prisoner of Love"	Scott St. Clair Sheets	3:05
10.	"Out-A-Touch"	Giraldo; Benatar; Myron Grombacher	4:16
Total length:			37:35

== Personnel ==
Credits adapted from the liner notes of Crimes of Passion.

=== Musicians ===
- Pat Benatar – vocals
- Neil Giraldo – lead and rhythm guitars, keyboards, background vocals
- Scott St. Clair Sheets – guitar
- Roger Capps – bass, background vocals
- Myron Grombacher – drums

=== Technical ===
- Keith Olsen – production, engineering
- Chris Minto – engineering
- Jo Hansch, Greg Fulginiti – mastering at Artisan Sound Recorders

=== Artwork ===
- Ria Lewerke-Shapiro – art direction, cover design
- Billy Bass – direction
- Leon LeCash – photographs

== Charts ==
=== Weekly charts ===
Weekly chart performance for Crimes of Passion
Chart (1980–1981)	Peak position
Australian Albums (Kent Music Report)	16
Canada Top Albums/CDs (RPM)	2
New Zealand Albums (RMNZ)	6
Swedish Albums (Sverigetopplistan)	27
US Billboard 200	2

=== Year-end charts ===
1980 year-end chart performance for Crimes of Passion
Chart (1980)	Position
Canada Top Albums/CDs (RPM)	25

1981 year-end chart performance for Crimes of Passion
Chart (1981)	Position
Canada Top Albums/CDs (RPM)	29
US Billboard 200	5

== Certifications ==
Certifications for Crimes of Passion
Region	Certification	Certified units/sales
Canada (Music Canada)	5× Platinum	500,000^{^}
France (SNEP)	Gold	100,000^{*}
New Zealand (RMNZ)	Gold	7,500^{^}
United States (RIAA)	4× Platinum	4,000,000^{^}
^{*} Sales figures based on certification alone.^{^} Shipments figures based on certification alone.
