= Midnight Ride (album) =

Studio album by Paul Revere & the Raiders
- Released: May 9, 1966
- Recorded: 1966
- Genre: Rock and roll
- Length: 29:08
- Label: Columbia
- Producer: Terry Melcher

Paul Revere & the Raiders chronology
Just Like Us! (1966)	Midnight Ride (1966)	The Spirit of '67 (1966)

Professional ratings
Review scores
Source	Rating
Allmusic	3/5 stars

Midnight Ride is the fifth studio album by American rock band Paul Revere & the Raiders. The album featured the U.S. top five single "Kicks" and also includes "(I'm Not Your) Steppin' Stone," which became a U.S. Top 20 hit for The Monkees in 1967.

The album is unique in the band's discography in that it contains songwriting credits by all five band members. Stylistic changes, combined with arguments over which group members were to get their songs included on the band's albums, resulted in lead guitarist Drake Levin quitting the group following the release of Midnight Ride. The album also marked the end of the band's relationship with the Brill Building music publishing house, where "Kicks" and "(I'm Not Your) Steppin' Stone" were written.

== Release and reception ==
Midnight Ride peaked at number nine on the U.S. Billboard 200 albums chart. The album was certified gold in the U.S. on March 20, 1967. Music critic Bruce Eder said the album "marked just about the pinnacle of Paul Revere & the Raiders' history as a source of great albums." The album was described in Billboard magazine as a "package of hard driving, pulsating rockers." Serene Dominic of the Phoenix New Times called the album "proof that [the band] squandered not a minute of that massive TV exposure." It is listed in the book 1001 Albums You Must Hear Before You Die by Robert Dimery and Michael Lydon.

In 1986 the song "Kicks" was covered by the Monkees as an album track on their album Then & Now... The Best of The Monkees.

Midnight Ride was remastered and re-released on February 1, 2000, by Sundazed Music with bonus tracks.

== Track listing ==
All tracks are written by Mark Lindsay and Paul Revere, except where noted.

Side one
No.	Title	Writer(s)	Length
1.	"Kicks"	Cynthia Weil, Barry Mann	2:28
2.	"There's Always Tomorrow"	Drake Levin, Mike Smith	2:39
3.	"Little Girl in the 4th Row"		2:58
4.	"Ballad of a Useless Man"	Levin	2:08
5.	"(I'm Not Your) Steppin' Stone"	Tommy Boyce, Bobby Hart	2:31
6.	"There She Goes"		1:47

Side two
No.	Title	Writer(s)	Length
1.	"All I Really Need Is You"		3:27
2.	"Get It On"	Levin, Phil Volk	3:12
3.	"Louie, Go Home"		2:41
4.	"Take a Look at Yourself"		1:48
5.	"Melody For an Unknown Girl"		1:59

=== Sundazed Music 2000 version ===
1. "Kicks" (Mann, Weil) — 2:28
2. "There's Always Tomorrow" (Levin, Smith) — 2:39
3. "Little Girl in the 4th Row" (Lindsay, Revere) — 2:58
4. "Ballad of a Useless Man" (Levin) — 2:08
5. "(I'm Not Your) Steppin' Stone" (Boyce, Hart) — 2:31
6. "There She Goes" (Lindsay, Revere) — 1:47
7. "All I Really Need Is You" (Lindsay, Revere) — 3:27
8. "Get It On" (Levin, Volk) — 3:12
9. "Louie, Go Home" (Lindsay, Revere) — 2:41
10. "Take a Look at Yourself" (Lindsay, Revere) — 1:48
11. "Melody For an Unknown Girl" (Lindsay, Revere) — 1:59
12. "Shake It Up" (Bonus track)
13. "Little Girl In The 4th Row" (Italian Version) (Bonus track)
14. "SS 396" (Bonus track)
15. "Corvair Baby" (Bonus track)

== Chart performance ==
Chart (1966)	Peak position
U.S. Billboard 200	9

== Credits and personnel ==
- Mark Lindsay – lead vocals (1, 3–7, 9–11), percussion, saxophone (11)
- Paul Revere – organ, backing vocals, arranger
- Drake Levin – guitar, backing vocals, liner notes
- Phil "Fang" Volk – bass guitar, backing and lead (8) vocals, liner notes
- Mike "Smitty" Smith – drums, lead vocals (2)
- Bob Irwin – mastering
- Terry Melcher – arranger, producer
- Rich Russell – design
