= Scott St. Clair Sheets =

American musician

Scott St. Clair Sheets is an American guitarist and songwriter best known for his work with Pat Benatar. Sheets was the rhythm guitarist for Benatar's band from 1979 to 1982. He co-wrote her 1981 song "Fire and Ice", which became a worldwide hit and won a Grammy in 1982.

== Career ==
=== The Brats and Pat Benatar ===
Sheets was a member of The Brats, a New York City-based proto-punk band, in the 1970s.

He joined Pat Benatar for her debut album, In the Heat of the Night, in 1979. He primarily played rhythm guitar with Benatar and occasionally co-wrote songs. Sheets remained part of Benatar's band for 1980's Crimes of Passion and 1981's Precious Time. Precious Time included the song “Fire and Ice,” which Sheets co-wrote with Benatar and Tom Kelly. “Fire and Ice” peaked at number 2 on the US Mainstream Chart, number 4 in Canada, and number 17 on the US Billboard Hot 100. “Fire and Ice” won Benatar a Grammy in 1982.

=== Career after Pat Benatar ===
Sheets left Benatar's band in 1982 to focus on his own musical projects and was involved with several bands over the following decades. In the late 1980s, Sheets joined John Ondrasik (who was later known as Five for Fighting) in the band they called John Scott. According to Ondrasik, John Scott was signed to a major management deal, but the rising popularity of grunge essentially ended the band's chances of success. Sheets also worked with Japanese pop star Minako Honda at this time.

He formed another band in the 1990s, called St. Clair, with vocalist Ron Corbett. St. Clair released a self-titled album in 1997 through MTM Music. The album featured Rudy Sarzo (Quiet Riot, Whitesnake) and Josquin Des Pres on bass, Jimmy Crespo (Aerosmith) on guitar, and also included three songs that Ondrasik had co-written. The St. Clair album featured a new recording of “Fire and Ice.” Sheets played guitar in the band and was the writer or co-writer for several songs on the album.

When The Brats reunited in 2004, Sheets rejoined them.

In 2008, Sheets was a finalist in American Idol's songwriting competition. His entry, a song called “Fly Me Away,” made it to the finals of the national competition. Sheets recruited Ondrasik, his former John Scott bandmate, to perform vocals on the song.

== Personal life ==
Sheets grew up in Garden City, Long Island, and lives in Brooklyn. He has a degree in graphic design and founded his own printing and computer graphics company in 1998.
