= Hit Me with Your Best Shot =

1980 single by Pat Benatar

- U.S. vinyl single picture sleeve

Single by Pat Benatar

from the album Crimes of Passion
- B-side: "Prisoner of Love"
- Released: September 15, 1980
- Recorded: 1980
- Studio: Sound City Studios (Van Nuys, CA)
- Genre: Power pop; arena rock
- Length: 2:51
- Label: Chrysalis
- Songwriter: Eddie Schwartz
- Producer: Keith Olsen

Pat Benatar singles chronology
"You Better Run" (1980)	"Hit Me with Your Best Shot" (1980)	"Treat Me Right" (1981)

"Hit Me with Your Best Shot" is a song recorded by American rock singer Pat Benatar and written by Eddie Schwartz. In 1980, it was released as the second single from her second album Crimes of Passion, which became her biggest-selling album. It hit No. 7 in Cash Box, and reached No. 9 on the Billboard Hot 100, becoming her first Top 10 hit in the US. It was particularly popular on album-rock radio stations, peaking at number 1 on the US Tunecaster Rock Tracks chart. It was also a Top 10 hit in Canada, although the only other country in which it charted was Australia where it reached the Top 40.

"Hit Me with Your Best Shot" sold well over a million copies in the U.S., achieving a gold certification by the RIAA. The song is one of Benatar's most recognizable tracks. Heard at many baseball and soccer games, the song has been featured on many compilation albums, including both multi-artist works as well as those just focusing on Benatar (such as 10 Great Songs and Greatest Hits).

In a 2022 interview, Benatar told USA Today that she would no longer perform the song in protest of mass shootings in the United States. "(The title) is tongue-in-cheek, but you have to draw the line. I can't say those words out loud with a smile on my face, I just can't," she explained. "I'm not going to go on stage and soapbox - I go to my legislators - but that's my small contribution to protesting. I'm not going to sing it."

== Structure ==
Schwartz said that he came up with the title of the song after attending a "pillow punching" therapy session in Toronto, but stated that the title is to be taken metaphorically. The song is in E major and features a general chord progression of I-IV-vi-V, with occasional added chords built on passing and neighboring tones, although Benatar has commented that in hindsight she would have preferred to replace the C♯ minor (vi) chord with F♯ minor (ii).

== Charts ==
=== Weekly charts ===
Chart (1980–1981)	Peak position
Australia	33
Canada Top Singles (RPM)	10
UK Singles (Record Business)	112
US Billboard Hot 100	9
U.S. Cash Box Top 100	7

=== Year-end charts ===
Chart (1980)	Position
U.S. Cash Box	70

Chart (1981)	Position
U.S. Billboard	46

== Certifications ==
Region	Certification	Certified units/sales
New Zealand (RMNZ)	2× Platinum	60,000^{‡}
United Kingdom (BPI)	Gold	400,000^{‡}
United States (RIAA)	Gold	1,000,000^{^}
^{^} Shipments figures based on certification alone.^{‡} Sales+streaming figures based on certification alone.

== Covers ==
Artists who have performed the song live include singer-songwriter Kelly Clarkson, whose version of "Hit Me with Your Best Shot" received praise by Time.

== See also ==
- Pat Benatar discography
