= Treat Me Right (song) =

- US vinyl single picture sleeve

Single by Pat Benatar

from the album Crimes of Passion
- B-side: "Never Wanna Leave You"
- Released: December 29, 1980
- Recorded: 1980
- Studio: Sound City Studios (Van Nuys, CA)
- Genre: Hard rock
- Length: 3:24
- Label: Chrysalis
- Songwriters: Doug Lubahn; Pat Benatar
- Producer: Keith Olsen

Pat Benatar singles chronology
"Hit Me with Your Best Shot" (1980)	"Treat Me Right" (1980)	"Fire and Ice" (1981)

"Treat Me Right" is a song by American singer Pat Benatar, released on December 29, 1980, as the third and final single from her second studio album, Crimes of Passion (1980). Produced by Keith Olsen, the song was written by Doug Lubahn and Benatar.

Record World described it as a "driving rocker" that has "furious guitar lines."

== Chart performance ==
"Treat Me Right" peaked at number 18 on the U.S. Billboard Hot 100 and spent two weeks at number 10 on the Cash Box Top 100. The song also charted at number 31 on the U.S. Mainstream Rock chart and reached number 12 in Canada, where it was the 76th biggest hit of 1981.

=== Weekly charts ===
Chart (1980–81)	Peak position
Canada Top Singles (RPM)	12
US Billboard Hot 100	18
US Mainstream Rock (Billboard)	31
U.S. Cash Box Top 100	10

=== Year-end charts ===
Chart (1981)	Rank
Canada	76
U.S. Cash Box	66
US Top Pop Singles (Billboard)	83

== Cover versions ==
- The song's co-writer, Doug Lubahn, also recorded the song with his own band, Riff Raff; it appeared on their 1981 album, Vinyl Futures.

== Popular culture ==
- The song was included in the 1982 film and soundtrack to the Richard Gere film, An Officer and a Gentleman.
