= Precious Time (album) =

Studio album by Pat Benatar
- Released: July 6, 1981
- Studios: Sound City Studios and Goodnight LA Studios, Los Angeles, California
- Genre: Hard rock
- Length: 35:30
- Label: Chrysalis
- Producers: Keith Olsen, Neil Giraldo

Pat Benatar chronology
Crimes of Passion (1980)	Precious Time (1981)	Get Nervous (1982)

Singles from Precious Time
- 1. "Fire and Ice" Released: July 6, 1981; 2. "Promises in the Dark" Released: September 25, 1981

Professional ratings
Review scores
Source	Rating
AllMusic	3.5/5 stars
Rolling Stone	2/5 stars
Smash Hits	4/10
Sounds	3/5 stars

Precious Time is the third studio album by American singer Pat Benatar, released on July 6, 1981 by the Chrysalis label. The album peaked at number one on the United States Billboard 200, her only record to do so in any country and was certified Double Platinum in the US.

Its lead single, the mid-tempo "Fire and Ice", was a Top 20 hit on the Billboard Hot 100 and reached number two on the Mainstream Rock chart. It became her biggest hit in Canada, peaking at number four on the RPM Singles Chart, though it only reached the Top 30 in Australia and New Zealand. The song won Benatar the Grammy Award for Best Female Rock Vocal Performance in 1982.

Precious Time's second single, the rapid, guitar-driven "Promises in the Dark", one of the few Benatar singles co-written by her and husband Neil Giraldo, was most successful in France, where it reached number 16, while it reached number 38 on the US Billboard Hot 100 and number 16 on the US Mainstream Rock chart. It also made the Top 30 in Canada but did not chart in other countries.

Precious Time peaked at number two in Canada, marking Benatar's third consecutive Top 3 album there, though its Double Platinum sales certification was less than her first two albums. The album was also a major hit in France, rising to number three, and it was the first of two albums to reach number two in New Zealand. It was her first Top 10 album in Australia and Sweden (her only one in the latter), and it reached the Top 30 in both the United Kingdom and Norway. The album was remastered and reissued on Capitol Records in 2006.

Record World called the title track a "volatile rocker" and noted that "the opening drama explodes with guitar fire."

== Track listing ==
Side one
No.	Title	Writer(s)	Length
1.	"Promises in the Dark"	Neil Giraldo, Pat Benatar	4:48
2.	"Fire and Ice"	Tom Kelly, Scott St. Clair Sheets, Benatar	3:19
3.	"Just Like Me" (Paul Revere & the Raiders cover)	Rick Dey, Roger Hart, Terry Melcher	3:30
4.	"Precious Time"	Billy Steinberg	6:03

Side two
No.	Title	Writer(s)	Length
5.	"It's a Tuff Life"	Giraldo	3:17
6.	"Take It Any Way You Want It"	Martin Briley, Giraldo	2:49
7.	"Evil Genius"	Giraldo, Benatar	4:34
8.	"Hard to Believe"	Giraldo, Myron Grombacher	3:26
9.	"Helter Skelter" (The Beatles cover)	John Lennon, Paul McCartney	3:50

== Personnel ==
- Pat Benatar – lead and backing vocals
- Neil Giraldo – lead guitar, keyboards, backing vocals
- Scott St. Clair Sheets – rhythm guitar
- Roger Capps – bass guitar
- Myron Grombacher – drums
- Alan Pasqua – piano
- Gary Herbig, Joel Peskin, Tom Scott, Larry Williams – saxophones on track 7
- Keith Olsen – tambourine on track 2

=== Production ===
- Produced by Keith Olsen and Neil Giraldo
- Engineered by Keith Olsen and Chris Minto at Sound City and Goodnight LA
- Mastered by Greg Fulginiti at Artisan Sound Recorders
- Art direction and design by Ria Lewerke-Shapiro

== Charts ==
=== Weekly charts ===
Weekly chart performance for Precious Time
Chart (1981)	Peak position
Australian Albums (Kent Music Report)	8
Canada Top Albums/CDs (RPM)	2
Dutch Albums (Album Top 100)	46
German Albums (Offizielle Top 100)	57
New Zealand Albums (RMNZ)	2
Japanese Albums (Oricon)	42
Norwegian Albums (VG-lista)	28
Swedish Albums (Sverigetopplistan)	9
UK Albums (Official Charts)	30
US Billboard 200	1
US Rock Albums (Billboard)	2

=== Year-end charts ===
Year-end chart performance for Precious Time
Chart (1981)	Position
Australian Albums (Kent Music Report)	63
Canada Top Albums/CDs (RPM)	18
New Zealand Albums (RMNZ)	39
US Billboard 200	95
Chart (1982)	Position
US Billboard 200	48

== Certifications ==
Region	Certification	Certified units/sales
Canada (Music Canada)	2× Platinum	200,000^{^}
France (SNEP)	Gold	100,000^{*}
New Zealand (RMNZ)	Gold	7,500^{^}
United States (RIAA)	2× Platinum	2,000,000^{^}
^{*} Sales figures based on certification alone.^{^} Shipments figures based on certification alone.
