= Kicks (song) =

Single by Paul Revere & the Raiders

from the album Midnight Ride
- B-side: "Shake It Up"
- Released: February 1966
- Genre: Garage rock; pop rock
- Length: 2:26
- Label: Columbia
- Songwriters: Barry Mann, Cynthia Weil
- Producer: Terry Melcher

Paul Revere & the Raiders singles chronology
"Just Like Me" (1965)	"Kicks" (1966)	"Hungry" (1966)

"Kicks" is a song composed by Barry Mann and Cynthia Weil, best known as a 1966 hit for American rock band Paul Revere & the Raiders.

Mann and Weill wrote the song for the Animals, but the band's lead singer Eric Burdon turned it down. Instead, Paul Revere & the Raiders recorded and released it as a single in 1966. The single was a number one hit in Canada, and reached number four in the United States. "Kicks" was included on the band's fifth album, Midnight Ride, released in May 1966. A live version of the song was recorded on the band's 1996 Greatest Hits Live compilation album.

Considered one of the earliest anti-drug songs, "Kicks" was composed and released during an era in which pro-hippie, pro-experimentation, and other counterculture themes were gaining popularity on U.S. FM radio stations. The song's message was consequently perceived as outdated by the emerging youth counterculture, as popular artists ranging from the Beatles to Jefferson Airplane had written songs whose themes sharply contrasted that of "Kicks." However, the song has received generally positive reviews by music critics in the decades since its release. In 2004, "Kicks" was ranked number 400 on Rolling Stone's list of The 500 Greatest Songs of All Time.

== Background and composition ==
After the Animals had chart success with the 1965 single "We Gotta Get Out of This Place," producer Terry Melcher asked the song's writers, Mann and Weil, to compose a similar song for Paul Revere & the Raiders. The result was "Kicks", a song originally offered to the Animals, but turned down by lead singer Eric Burdon. Mann and Weil wrote the song as a warning to a friend about the dangers of drug use. In the song, a narrator pleads with a girl that drug use causes addiction and that soft drugs can lead to the use of hard drugs, though the lyrics never explicitly mention any of those things; ultimately the lyrics conclude that her real problem is psychological ("you'll never run away from you") and that there is "another way" to face the trials of life.

Musically, the song's lead guitar lines recall the Beatles, while its bass figures are similar to those popularized by the Byrds. The song contains closer harmonies and a more euphonious melodic arrangement than the band's previous single, "Just Like Me". Lead singer Mark Lindsay's R&B vocal style, combined with the song's guitar and organ instrumentation, is reminiscent of British bands such as the Kinks and the Yardbirds.

== Release and reception ==
"Kicks"
A sample of "Kicks" from Paul Revere & the Raiders' 1966 album, Midnight Ride. This sample illustrates the song shifting from the first chorus to the second verse.

In March 1966, "Kicks" entered the U.S. Billboard Hot 100 chart at number 62. The song peaked at number four in May, and spent 14 weeks on the chart. Within two months of its release, the single had sold 500,000 copies. It was the highest-charting U.S. hit to that date for Paul Revere & the Raiders, later eclipsed only by 1971's "Indian Reservation (The Lament of the Cherokee Reservation Indian)," which reached number one. "Kicks" became the band's first Canadian number one single when it topped the Canadian Singles Chart in May 1966. In Sweden, it reached number 14 on Tio i Topp.

The song is considered the first with an anti-drug message to become a U.S. hit single. With the passage of the Communications Act of 1934, the Federal Communications Commission was chartered to monitor the radio and TV industries, meaning broadcasts were subject to censorship. Some censors, based on the song title alone, mistakenly believed "Kicks" to glorify drug use. Despite the song's commercial success, its lyrics were soon perceived as outdated by young people, as they increasingly experimented with marijuana and LSD. Meanwhile, songs emerged from popular artists who praised, sometimes cryptically and sometimes overtly, the use of psychedelic drugs. These acts included the Beatles, the Rolling Stones, the Grateful Dead, Jefferson Airplane and the Byrds. The messages contained within hit songs such as "White Rabbit," "Along Comes Mary" and "Eight Miles High" were antithetical to that of "Kicks," which contributed to a perception by members of the burgeoning youth counterculture that Paul Revere & the Raiders were part of the Establishment. Singer–songwriter David Crosby, then a member of the Byrds, was upset with the success of the song, particularly as it came just after his group's "Eight Miles High" had been boycotted by many U.S. radio stations. Crosby described "Kicks" as "a dumb anti-drug song" that took "a falsely adopted stance. With 'Eight Miles High', we were talking about something very near and dear to our hearts."

On the other hand, Beach Boys founder Brian Wilson singled out "Kicks" as one of his favorites of Terry Melcher's works. Music critic Chris Brown of Crawdaddy! praised the song's vocal, saying "the use of harmony is well-timed and wonderfully executed; and the power in the vocal as the last word of each verse stretches into the chorus is undoubtedly what sells the song." Bruce Eder of AllMusic called it "a great song that managed to be cool and anti-drug." In his 2009 book, Everybody Must Get Stoned, author R. U. Sirius named "Kicks" the number one rock song against drugs. Sirius said, "With clear and concise lyrics by the famous Mann-Weil songwriting team, there's no cheese on rock's first anti-drug platter." The song was ranked number 400 on Rolling Stone's 2004 list of The 500 Greatest Songs of All Time. The song placed 36th on Paste Magazine's 2014 list of the "50 Best Garage Rock Songs of All Time".

== Other versions ==
Paul Revere & the Raiders performed a live version of "Kicks" on the band's 1996 Greatest Hits Live compilation. Lindsay, with the Mark Lewis Trio, re-recorded the song on the 1990 album Looking for Shelter. A live version appears on his 1999 album Legends Live: Mark Lindsay & Friends. Former bass guitarist Phil Volk, with his band Fang & the Gang, performed the song on the 2005 tribute album Fang Reveres the Raiders. Mann and Weil revisited the song in their 2004 Off Broadway revue They Wrote That? The Songs of Barry Mann & Cynthia Weil.

Singer-songwriter Del Shannon recorded a version of "Kicks" for his 1966 album This Is My Bag. Surf rock group the Challengers covered the song on their album California Kicks, also released in 1966. The Leathercoated Minds, a studio band featuring J. J. Cale on guitar and production, performed the song on their 1968 album A Trip Down the Sunset Strip. Rock band Nazz covered the song for a compilation album which ended up being cancelled, but their recording eventually saw release on Nazz III (a collection of archival Nazz recordings) in 1971. Nazz guitarist Todd Rundgren recalled, "We thought the song was ok, but Paul Revere and the Raiders were funny. So we had to break it down in the middle and do something more Mothers of Invention." In 1974, John Mellencamp was signed to MCA Records after Mellencamp recorded a demo on which he performed the song. Rock band Earth Quake recorded a version of the song on their 1977 album Levelled. Leif Garrett covered "Kicks" on his 1979 album Same Goes for You.

Naz Nomad and the Nightmares, a side project featuring members of punk band The Damned, covered the song on their 1984 album Give Daddy the Knife Cindy. The Monkees included their version of the song on their 1986 greatest hits compilation Then & Now... The Best of The Monkees. Rock band the Flamin' Groovies released "Kicks" as a single from their 1986 album One Night Stand. In 1999, jazz guitarist Mimi Fox released the album Kicks, on which her rendition of the song appears. Garage rock band the Gants added a version of the song on their 2000 greatest hits album I Wonder. Everclear covered the song on their 2008 album The Vegas Years.

== Personnel ==
Paul Revere & the Raiders

- Mark Lindsay – lead vocals, tambourine
- Drake Levin – 12-string lead guitar, backing vocals
- Phil Volk – bass guitar, backing vocals
- Paul Revere – organ, backing vocals
- Mike "Smitty" Smith – drums

Session musicians and production staff

- Jerry Cole – rhythm guitar
- Terry Melcher – producer

== Chart performance ==
Chart (1966)	Peak position
Canadian RPM Top Singles	1
Sweden (Tio i Topp)	14
U.S. Billboard Hot 100	4
U.S. Cash Box Top 100 Singles	3
U.S. Record World 100 Top Pops	5
