= Louie, Go Home =

Single by Paul Revere and the Raiders
- B-side: "Have Love, Will Travel"
- Released: March 17, 1964
- Recorded: 1963
- Genre: Garage rock; psychedelic rock (1966 album version)
- Length: 2:40 (single version)
- Label: Columbia
- Songwriters: Paul Revere, Mark Lindsay
- Producers: Terry Melcher, Roger Hart

Paul Revere and the Raiders singles chronology
"Louie Louie" (1963)	"Louie, Go Home" (1964)	"Over You" (1964)

"Louie, Go Home" is a song written by Paul Revere and Mark Lindsay as a sequel after Richard Berry declined their request for a follow-up to "Louie Louie". It was recorded by Paul Revere and the Raiders in 1963 and released in March 1964.

The group recorded two versions of the song. The original (with sax opening) was only released as a single. A re-recorded "groovy, quasi-psychedelic rearrangement" (with guitar opening) was featured on the Midnight Ride album in 1966 as well as the group's first Greatest Hits compilation the following year.

== Cover versions ==
=== Davie Jones with the King Bees version ===
"Louie, Louie Go Home"

Single by Davie Jones with the King Bees
- A-side: "Liza Jane"
- Released: 5 June 1964
- Recorded: 1964
- Genre: Rock, beat
- Length: 2:09
- Label: Vocalion Pop
- Songwriters: Paul Revere, Mark Lindsay
- Producer: Leslie Conn

David Bowie singles chronology
"Louie, Louie Go Home" (1964)	"I Pity The Fool" (1965)

When manager Leslie Conn obtained an acetate of the Raiders version in 1964, the young David Bowie, then still called David Jones, recorded the song with his band Davie Jones and the King Bees. It was titled "Louie, Louie Go Home" and released as the B-side of his first single "Liza Jane".

Bowie's version of the song also appeared on the compilations Another Face (1981) and Early On (1964-1966) (1991). Bowie borrowed the call-and-response refrain of 'Just a little bit louder now' for the track "She'll Drive the Big Car" in 2003.

=== Other versions ===
The Who recorded the song as "Lubie (Come Back Home)" in 1965. It was first released on the 1985 compilation Who's Missing.

A French version was released in 1964 as "Louie Reviens Chez Toi" by the Belgian group Ariane et Les 10/20.

Spanish versions were released as "Lupe Vuelve A Casa" by Los Shain's (Peru, 1967) and Los Piedras Rosas (Bolivia, 1971).

Other cover versions include the A-Bones (1993), Ceeds (1966, recorded as "Louie, Come Home), Chambermen (1966), Chesterfield Kings with Mark Lindsay (1998), Coachmen (196?), Jack Ely and the Courtmen (1966), Fireballs (1966), Fugitives (1966), Fuzztones (2015), Grip Weeds (2021), Hypstrz (1981), Images (Italy, 1970), Missing Lynx (1967), Mussies (1966), Shades of Grey (1966), Time Beings (1996), Transatlantics (UK, 1966), Vandells (1967), and Danny Zella and the Zell Rocks (1996).

A 1966 single released with the same title by the Campus Kingsmen is a different song.

Answer song versions include "Louie Come Home" by the Epics in 1965 and "Louie Louie's Comin' Back" by the Pantels in 1966.
