= Oscar Washington =

American songwriter

- Born: Oscar Douglas Washington; Feb 18, 1912
- Died: 2004/05
- Genres: Jazz
- Instrument: Guitar

Oscar Douglas Washington (Feb 18, 1912 – 2004/05) was an American songwriter, guitarist, school teacher and record label owner. He is credited as co-writer of the jazz and rhythm and blues classic "Night Train", and was also influential in the early career of Chuck Berry.

== Childhood ==
Washington was born in Tulsa, Oklahoma. His family fled Tulsa during the 1921 Tulsa race massacre.

== Career ==
By the early 1950s, Washington was working in St Louis, Missouri as a school teacher and guitarist. There he collaborated with saxophonist Jimmy Forrest on the composition of "Night Train", which became a number 1 R&B hit in 1952. Most sources credit Washington with writing the lyrics of the song. He also recorded under the name Faith Douglass.

In 1953, he started the small independent Ballad record label in St Louis. The label released a series of doo-wop singles by the Swans, which had some regional success. After hearing an unrecorded guitarist, Chuck Berry, playing in clubs, he persuaded Berry to make his first record as part of another group, Joe Alexander & the Cubans. They released a calypso record, "Oh Maria", in 1954, which was co-written by Washington. It has been suggested that Berry played guitar on the record, though Berry later denied any involvement. Although Washington did not continue to work with Berry, he continued to release occasional records on the Ballad label until the late 1950s. From 1966-1968 he revived the Ballad record label for a group called The Gifts and another called The Citations. In the late 1960s, he was involved in the small SaintMo label, which also released several singles with little success.

Broadcast Music, Inc. (BMI) credits Washington with 70 compositions as a songwriter, including "Night Train".

== Death ==
In August 2005, human remains unearthed at a property in St Louis were tentatively identified as those of Oscar Washington, aged 93, who had not been seen for over a year. Police had been looking for his son, Farand Washington, in connection with the cashing of Social Security checks made out to his father. After Farand Washington was killed in a crash when he lost control of his car, and following an anonymous tip-off by a neighbor, police undertook a search of the family's property, where they found the buried remains. It was reported that police believed that the remains were those of Oscar Washington, but an autopsy failed to determine the cause of his death.
