= Just Like Me (Paul Revere & the Raiders song) =

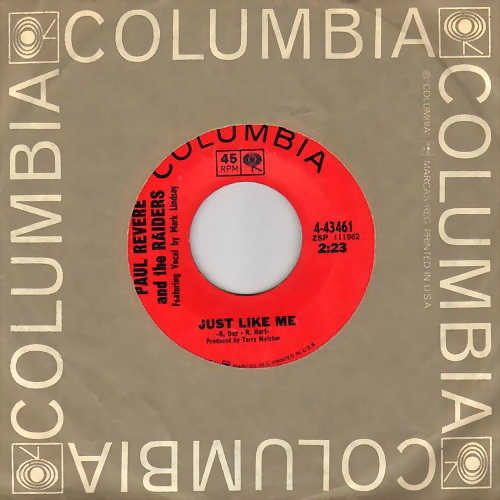

Single by Paul Revere & the Raiders

from the album Just Like Us!
- B-side: "B.F.D.R.F. Blues" (Non-LP-track)
- Released: November 15, 1965
- Genre: Garage rock; hard rock
- Length: 2:23
- Label: Columbia
- Songwriter: Rick Dey
- Producer: Terry Melcher

Paul Revere & the Raiders singles chronology
"Steppin' Out" (1965)	"Just Like Me" (1965)	"Kicks" (1966)

"Just Like Me" is a 1965 single by Paul Revere & the Raiders featuring Mark Lindsay as vocalist. It was released on Columbia Records and marked the beginning of a string of garage rock classics. As their second major national hit, "Just Like Me" reached #11 on the US charts and was one of the first rock records, due to guitarist Drake Levin, to feature a distinctive, double-tracked guitar solo. On The New Zealand Listener charts it peaked at #6.

== Background ==
The tune was written by Rick Dey of the Longview-based band The Wilde Knights. The chord changes are ||: C Bb | F G :|| repeated continuously. Raiders manager Roger Hart paid them $5,000 for the use of the song.

== Chart performance ==
Chart (1965–1966)	Peak position
US Billboard Hot 100	11

== Cover versions ==
- Pat Benatar on her 1981 album Precious Time.
- The Circle Jerks on Wild in the Streets, their 1982 album.
