= Paul Revere & the Raiders =

American rock band

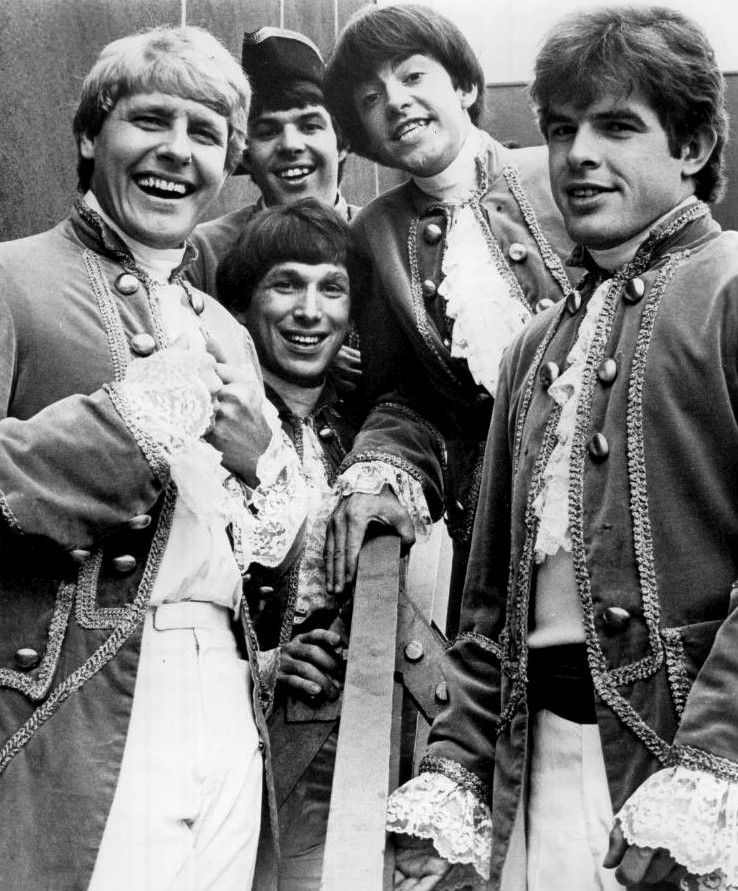
- The band in 1967. Front L–R: Paul Revere, Mike Smith. Center: Jim Valley. Back: Phil Volk, Mark Lindsay.

Background information
- Also known as: Downbeats, Raiders
- Origin: Boise, Idaho, U.S.
- Genres: Pop rock; garage rock; psychedelic pop; rock and roll
- Years active: 1958–1976; 1978–2014
- Label: Columbia
- Spinoffs: Brotherhood, Friendsong, Paul Revere's Raiders
- Past members: Paul Revere; Mark Lindsay; Robert White; Richard White; William Hibbard; Dick McGarvin; Red Hughes; Ronnie Robson; David Bell; Jerry Labrum; Andrea Loper; Mike "Smitty" Smith; Ross Allemang; Steve West; Pierre Ouellette; Dick Walker; Charlie Coe; Drake "Kid" Levin; Mike "Doc" Holladay; Phil "Fang" Volk; Jim "Harpo" Valley; Freddy Weller; Joe Correro, Jr. Keith Allison; Omar Martinez; Robert Wooley; Blair Hill; Michael Bradley; Carlo Driggs; Darrin Medley; Doug Heath; Ron Foos; Danny Krause; Jamie Revere; Darren Dowler; Tommy Scheckel; David Huizenga; Arny Bailey

Paul Revere & the Raiders (also known as Raiders) were an American rock band formed in Boise, Idaho, in 1958. They saw considerable U.S. mainstream success in the second half of the 1960s and early 1970s. The band was known for including Revolutionary War-style clothes in their attire.

Originally an instrumental rock combo called the Downbeats, the Raiders were formed in 1958 by organist Paul Revere, and included singer Mark Lindsay. After charting in 1961 with the minor hit "Like, Long Hair" and then in late 1963 just missing Billboard's Hot 100 with a cover of "Louie Louie", the band was signed to Columbia Records, under the tutelage of producer Terry Melcher. In January 1966 the single "Just Like Me"—propelled by exposure on Dick Clark's shows such as Where The Action Is—reached no. 11 on the Hot 100, followed by the consecutive Top Tens "Kicks" and "Hungry", thus establishing the band as national stars. Clark's TV shows showcased Lindsay as a teen idol and Revere as the "madman" of the group, and between 1966 and '69 they reached the top 30 with 12 hits. Bolstered by the success of the singles, the three 1966 albums Just Like Us, Midnight Ride and The Spirit of '67 all were gold-certified by the RIAA.

Mark Lindsay replaced Terry Melcher as the Raiders' producer, and the band scored with the US No. 20 hit "Let Me!" in 1969. In early 1970 the band's name was shortened to "Raiders" and one year later the hugely successful cover of the song "Indian Reservation (The Lament of the Cherokee Reservation Indian)" reached number one in both the US and Canada and was eventually certified platinum in 1996. But the failure to continue the record's success led to the breakup of the band after being dropped by Columbia in 1975. In 1978, Revere went back to live performances with a show that mixed comedy and rock and roll. He died of cancer in 2014.

The group had many lineup changes, with their most well-known "classic" lineup being: Mark Lindsay (vocals and saxophone), Paul Revere (keyboards), Drake "Kid" Levin (guitar), Phil "Fang" Volk (bass), and Mike "Smitty" Smith (drums). This lineup recorded most of the material on the group's first five Columbia albums from 1965 to 1967.

== History ==
=== Early years ===
Initially based in Boise, Idaho, the Raiders began as an instrumental rock band led by organist and founder Paul Revere (1938–2014). The band relocated to Portland, Oregon, when Revere returned from serving in the armed forces in 1962.

Revere had been in The Red Hughes band, and during a gig Mark Lindsay asked to join them on stage. In his early 20s, Revere owned several restaurants in Caldwell, Idaho, and while picking up buns from a bakery where Lindsay worked, Paul spoke to another worker about a "wild kid" that had come in and sang with them at their last gig, Lindsay "whipped off (his) glasses and (his) baker's hat and said, "That was me!"", to which Paul told him he should come down and rehearse. The circumstance of their meeting was later referred to in the tongue-in-cheek song "Legend of Paul Revere", recorded by the group. Lindsay joined Revere's band in 1958, by which point they had stopped being "The Red Hughes Band" as Red Hughes himself had stopped showing up at rehearsals and Lindsay would gradually sit in more as lead singer. In 1960, the band noticed the singing of a teenage girl, Andrea Loper, who was working in the drive through of a restaurant and asked her to join; Loper left after a few months to be with her partner and to have children.

Originally called the Downbeats, they changed their name to Paul Revere & the Raiders in 1960 on the eve of their first record release for Gardena Records. The band garnered their first hit in the Pacific Northwest in 1961, with the instrumental "Like, Long Hair". The record had enough national appeal that it peaked at no. 38 on the Billboard Hot 100 on April 17, 1961. The first official lineup of The Raiders was Revere on keys, Lindsay on vocals, brothers Robert and Richard White on guitar, William Hibbard on bass and Jerry Labrum on drums. When Revere was drafted for military service, he became a conscientious objector and worked as a cook at a mental institution for a year and a half of deferred service. During the same time period, Lindsay pumped gas in Wilsonville, Oregon. On the strength of their Top 40 single, Lindsay toured the U.S. in the summer of 1961 with a band that featured Leon Russell taking Revere's place on piano.

By summer 1962, Revere and Lindsay were working together again in Oregon with a version of the Raiders that featured Mike "Smitty" Smith (1942–2001), a drummer who would spend two extended periods with the band. Also in this new incarnation was sixteen year old guitarist Steve West, and bassist Ross Allemang, who left in January 1963 and from that point until the following September, Dick Walker was on bass.

Around this time, KISN DJ Roger Hart, who was producing teen dances, was looking for a band to hire. Hart had a casual conversation with a bank teller who told him about a band called "Paul Revere-something". Hart obtained Revere's phone number and they met for lunch. Hart hired the band for one of his teen dances. Soon afterward, Hart became the group's personal manager. It was Hart who suggested they record "Louie Louie", for which Hart paid them about $50, producing the song and placing it on his Sandē label, ultimately attracting the attention of Columbia Records. According to Lindsay, the Raiders were a "bunch of white-bread kids doing their best to sound black. We got signed to Columbia on the strength of sounding like this." Both the Kingsmen and the Raiders recorded "Louie Louie" in the same studio Northwestern Motion Pictures and Sound Recordings, Inc. (NWI) in Portland, Oregon, in April 1963. Sources concur that the Kingsmen session was first but vary on the date of the Raiders recording.

Steve West left the band soon after "Louie Louie" was released, and was replaced by Pierre Ouellette (who would later become famous as a novelist) for a month, before he was replaced by Charlie Coe (born November 19, 1944). Coe would remain in the group for the remainder of the summer. In September 1963, Coe and Walker both left, and were replaced by Drake "The Kid" Levin and Mike "Doc" Holladay, respectively.

=== Hits and promotion in the "Action" era ===
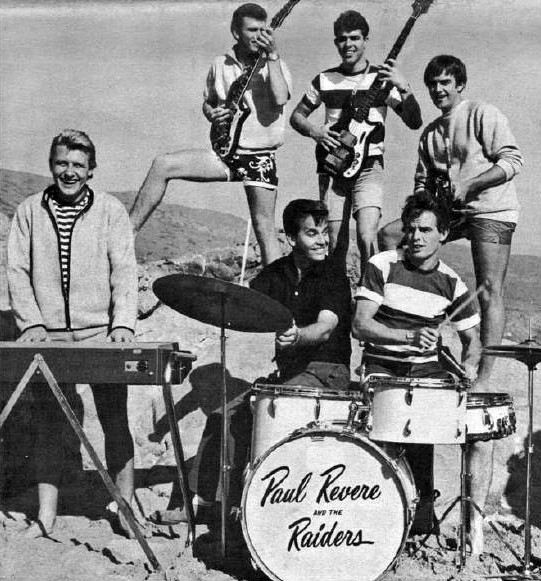
Where the Action Is photo of Dick Clark with the group in 1966. Front L–R: Paul Revere, Clark, and Mike Smith. Back L–R: Drake Levin, Phil Volk, and Mark Lindsay.

In 1965, the Raiders began recording a string of garage rock classics. Under the guidance of producer Terry Melcher, the group relocated to Los Angeles and increasingly emulated the sounds of British Invasion bands such as the Beatles, the Rolling Stones, the Dave Clark Five, and the Animals, while adding an American, R&B feel. Their first major national hit, "Just Like Me", was one of the first rock records to feature a distinctive, double-tracked guitar solo, performed by guitarist Drake Levin. A late 1965 release, the single peaked at No. 11 on Billboard's Hot 100 in January 1966 during a then-lengthy 15-week run.

Their Hot 100 hits from this period include "Kicks" (No. 4), "Hungry" (No. 6), "The Great Airplane Strike" (No. 20), "Good Thing" (No. 4) and "Him or Me – What's It Gonna Be?" (No. 5). Of these, "Kicks" emerged as their best-known hit – a hip-sounding record with an anti-drug message, written by Barry Mann and Cynthia Weil and originally earmarked for the Animals. (Mann later revealed in interviews that the song was written about their friend, fellow 1960s songwriter Gerry Goffin, whose ongoing drug problems were interfering with his career and his relationship with then wife Carole King.)

The band appeared regularly in the U.S. on national television, most notably on Dick Clark's Where the Action Is, Happening '68, and It's Happening, the latter two co-hosted by Revere and Lindsay. In November 1966, the band appeared as themselves performing a song on the popular Batman television series in the episode "Hizzonner the Penguin".

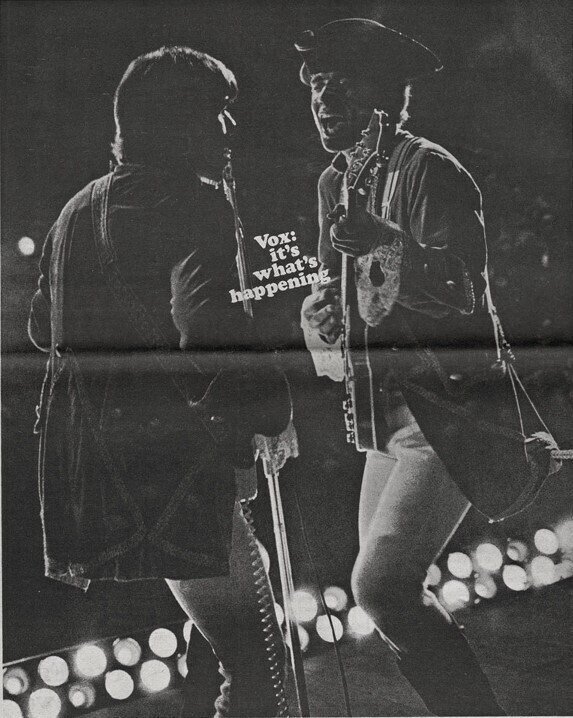
Volk and Levin featured in 1967 advertisement for Vox

The Raiders had an endorsement deal with the Vox Amplifier Company through its U.S. distributor, the Thomas Organ Company, with Revere using the Vox Continental combo organ and Volk occasionally playing the Vox Phantom IV bass. When performing, the entire band was plugged into Vox Super Beatle amplifiers. The band was reported to be the first major band in history to tour with all members amplified, including sidemen such as horn players. When Levin left the group in 1966 to join the National Guard he was replaced by Jim Valley, another Northwest musician the Raiders had met during their days playing the Portland and Seattle music circuits. Valley was dubbed "Harpo" by the other Raiders due to a vague resemblance to the famous Marx brother.

By mid-1967, having released five albums in just over two years, the Raiders were Columbia's top-selling rock group. Their Greatest Hits album released that spring was one of two releases selected by Clive Davis to test a higher list price for albums expected to be particularly popular (along with Bob Dylan's Greatest Hits).

=== Major lineup change ===
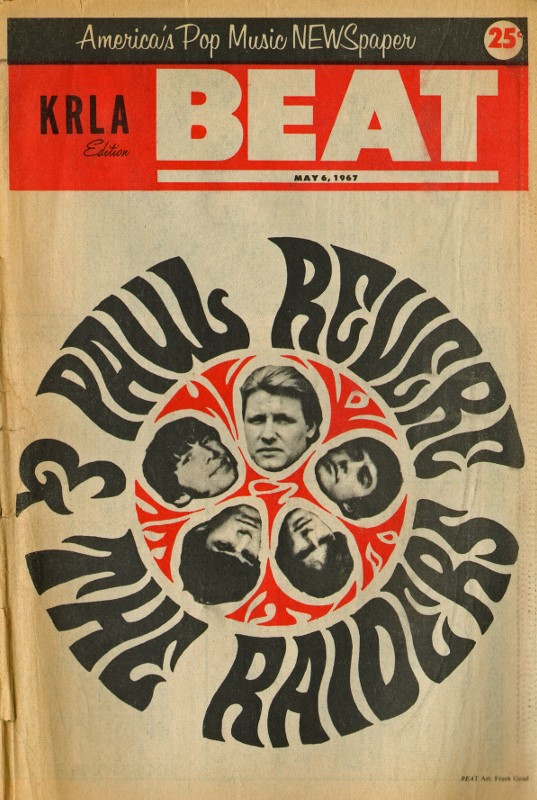
Featured on the cover of the May 6, 1967 issue of KRLA Beat

At the height of the group's popularity, Valley, Volk, and Smith left the band. The split happened for a number of reasons, among them being the feeling that the group was prevented from evolving into a more egalitarian creative team, upset at being replaced by studio musicians on recordings (Volk denied this and said that the Wrecking Crew were hired by Melcher and Lindsay only to augment the band) and unhappy with a continued teen-oriented direction while a more serious rock 'n' roll style was emerging.

Valley was the first to leave. Levin completed his National Guard service and rejoined the band during its spring 1967 tour. In April, Levin, Volk, and Smith flew to New York together when the Raiders were booked to perform on The Ed Sullivan Show. Revere was upset about Valley, Volk, and Smith leaving the group, blaming Levin for their departures. Levin showed up at the Ed Sullivan Theater to perform with Volk and Smith for the very last time, but Revere refused to let him play. Unbeknownst to the group, Revere had hired a new guitar player, Freddy Weller, to perform that night. Levin held no grudges about this; he showed Weller the chords to the songs and watched from the wings as the Raiders made their one and only appearance on Sullivan's show on April 30, 1967. It was the only time that the lineup of Revere, Lindsay, Smith, Volk, and Weller performed together. The following month, Volk and Smith left, subsequently rejoining Levin to form the band Brotherhood which would release two albums on RCA Records. Charlie Coe, who had played guitar for the group in 1963, rejoined the band on bass, and Joe Correro Jr. was recruited as the new drummer.

=== The "Happening" era ===
By 1968, changing musical tastes rendered the group and its matching revolutionary war costumes unfashionable, but they still continued to have modest hits through the rest of the decade, including "Peace of Mind", "I Had a Dream", "Too Much Talk", "Don't Take It So Hard", "Cinderella Sunshine", "Mr. Sun, Mr. Moon", and "Let Me!", which became their first gold record. On January 6, 1968, just four months after the cancellation of Where The Action Is, Revere and Lindsay returned to the air as hosts of a new Dick Clark-produced show in which the Raiders made several appearances, Happening '68 (later shortened to Happening). This weekly series was joined from July to September that year by a Clark-produced daily series It's Happening, also hosted by Revere and Lindsay. In August 1968, bassist Coe left the group again to get married and was replaced by former Action heartthrob Keith Allison. According to author Derek Taylor, the Raiders were seen as "irrelevances. . . . Nervous citizens felt reassured that some good safe things never changed".

Terry Melcher ended his association with the group to focus on other artists and Mark Lindsay produced and arranged all records beginning with the psychedelic album Something Happening. The band moved further away from its garage rock roots and adopted a more layered, complex sound on Something Happening and the follow-up albums Hard 'N' Heavy (with Marshmallow) and Alias Pink Puzz. (According to allmusic.com, Pink Puzz was the identity under which the Raiders first tried to get the album played on FM radio, a gambit that failed though the band kept the joke name for the album title.)

The success of "Let Me!" allowed Paul Revere and the Raiders to tour Europe with the Beach Boys in the summer of 1969 (they also recorded two songs for the long running German music program Beat-Club). The band also performed a specially written song and appeared in a television commercial for Pontiac's new GTO-branded muscle car, "The Judge". The group was also invited to appear at the Woodstock festival but reportedly turned down the invitation. Later in 1969, Happening ended its run on television and Lindsay released a hit single as a solo artist, "Arizona", written by Kenny Young, which peaked at No. 10 on the Billboard chart.

=== The Raiders: early 1970s ===
In an effort to change the band's sound and image, its name was officially shortened to "Raiders" starting with the 1970 album Collage. It drew a glowing review from Rolling Stone magazine, with critic Lenny Kaye singling out Lindsay for praise: "[He] never fails to give the impression that he knows what he's doing. Almost single-handedly, he's brought the Raiders to a stronger position than they've occupied in years". Collage proved to be a commercial failure (No. 154 on the Billboard 200) and Lindsay began to turn toward solo projects. Joe Correro departed after their spring tour ended and replaced by his predecessor Mike Smith.

The Raiders achieved their greatest success with their cover of John D. Loudermilk's "Indian Reservation", which was brought to the band by Columbia A&R man Jack Gold. Revere worked to promote the single and "Indian Reservation" peaked at No. 1 for one week in July 1971. It became Columbia's biggest-selling single for almost a decade, clearing over six million units. The success of the single was followed by the album of the same name that reached No. 19 and consisted mainly of covers. The group expanded to include drummer Omar Martinez and keyboardist Bob Wooley.

The last Raiders album, Country Wine (1972), failed to crack the Billboard 200. Later that year, they began preparation on follow up album, Love Music. The intended title track was released as a promotion for the project, but it reached only No. 97, marking the Raiders' final chart appearance and resulting in the album being shelved by Columbia. Without a chart presence, the band was relegated to playing lounges and state fairs as an "oldies" act, a situation Revere found pleasing, but not Lindsay. Weller and Smith departed in December 1972, Weller being replaced by guitarist Doug Heath (born October 9, 1948).

=== The later 1970s ===
Lineup changes ensued in early 1975, with Mark Lindsay departing after a gig at Knott's Berry Farm. He recorded two final singles for Warner Bros. records in 1977, then turned his attentions to film scoring and commercials. He was also head of A&R (artists & repertoire) for United Artists Records in the 1970s. Keith Allison departed in April 1975, to be replaced by Ron Foos (born December 25, 1949), later of Ironhorse.

Country music was the choice of former guitarist Freddy Weller, who had success on the country charts, starting with his country version of Joe South's "Games People Play" in 1969 reaching no. 2. He recorded albums (his first two solo albums produced by Mark Lindsay). Top 10 singles on the country charts included covers of Chuck Berry's "Promised Land", the Cowsills' "Indian Lake", as well as "These Are Not My People" and "Another Night of Love" for Columbia during this period. (Weller's stint with the Raiders was 1967–1973.)

In a memorable event, Revere married for the second time on July 4, Bicentennial Year 1976 onstage at a Raiders show. Revere announced his retirement from the music business at the end of 1976, but was back on the road by 1978 with a new cast of Raiders. Along with guitarist Doug Heath, Revere linked in this period with a group called "Louie Fontaine & the Rockets", and went on the road with them as "Paul Revere & the Raiders", featuring Blair Hill ("Louie Fontaine") as lead vocalist. This configuration even appeared as "Paul Revere's Raiders" without Paul, for a while in 1978. The "classic" lineup of Revere, Lindsay, Levin, Volk, and Smith reunited for a final time with Dick Clark on national television in 1979 and performed a medley of their biggest hits. The same year "Indian Reservation" was covered by the German group Orlando Riva Sound.

=== The 1980s to 2014 ===
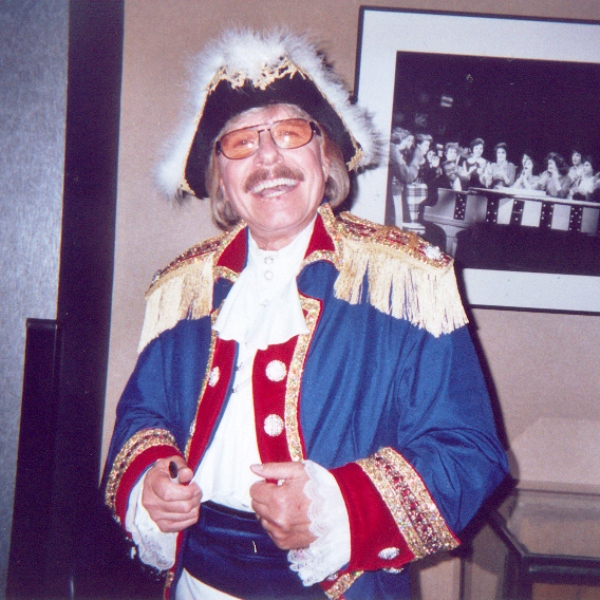
Paul Revere in 2007

The punk rock and new wave eras saw a wave of interest in the Raiders' music; "I'm Not Your Stepping Stone" was covered by the Sex Pistols, Minor Threat, Fang, and the Farm – although the Monkees' version was better known than the Raiders'. "Just Like Me" was covered by the Circle Jerks, Joan Jett and Pat Benatar. David Bowie covered "Louie, Go Home". The Who recorded the song in 1965, changing the title and lyrics to "Lubie (Come Back Home)", and released it in 1985 on a rarities album and in 2002 on the deluxe edition reissue of their first album My Generation. "Hungry" was covered by Sammy Hagar. The Flamin' Groovies recorded three Raiders songs ("Him or Me – What's It Gonna Be?", "Sometimes" and "Ups and Downs") and the Morrells did a country music-influenced arrangement of "Ups and Downs". The Paisley Underground, garage rock revival, and grunge movements all acknowledged the Raiders' influence. "Kicks" was covered by Micky Dolenz and Peter Tork of the Monkees as one of three new recordings included on their 1986 compilation, Then & Now... The Best of The Monkees.

Mark Lindsay cut a version of "Ups And Downs" in 1994 with Carla Olson, which appeared on her Reap The Whirlwind album.

Revere continued with a relatively stable lineup through the 80's and 90's, featuring longtime members Omar Martinez (drums and vocals since 1972), Doug Heath (guitarist for the Raiders since 1973), Ron Foos (bass, Allison's replacement in 1975), Danny Krause (keyboards, vocals since 1980) and lead vocalist Carlo Driggs (who replaced Michael Bradley). New record releases included the self-produced Special Edition in 1983, with Michael Bradley on vocals, and Paul Revere Rides Again, released in 1983 through Radio Shack stores. They also recorded a home video for MCA Universal in 1987 titled "The Last Madman of Rock 'N' Roll". Revere's son Jamie (born February 15, 1966) joined the band on guitar for several years in the 1990s, featured on Generic Rock & Roll (1992) and Generic Rock 2 (1996).

On September 19, 1997, four of the group's classic lineup (Lindsay, Levin, Volk and Smith) reunited in full costume (without Revere) for a 30th anniversary performance in Portland. In 2000 Sundazed Records released a two-CD package entitled Mojo Workout that focused on the R&B and soul sounds from early in the Raiders' Columbia career. In 2001, the Raiders released Ride to the Wall, featuring several new songs, along with their versions of 1960s hits, with proceeds going to help veterans of the Vietnam War. They performed at Rolling Thunder's Memorial Day event in Washington D.C. in 2001 for POW-MIA's of the Vietnam era. A steady touring schedule kept Paul and his "new Raiders" in the public eye. Keith Allison, who played in the Raiders from 1968 to 1975, has since gone into acting, and appeared in the films Phantom of the Paradise and Gods and Generals among others.

On October 13, 2007, Paul Revere & the Raiders, along with their manager Roger Hart, were inducted into the Oregon Music Hall of Fame. Lindsay, Volk, and Roger Hart were present to accept their awards. In 2010, the band was inducted into the Hit Parade Hall of Fame. Revere announced his retirement from the band in August 2014; the group planned to tour without him as "Paul Revere's Raiders". In October 2014, the band's web site announced that Revere had died "peacefully" on October 4, 2014, at his Garden Valley, Idaho home, a "small estate overlooking a tranquil river canyon", from cancer. He was 76 years old.

On October 10, 2014, at the Los Angeles Forum, Tom Petty performed "I'm Not Your Stepping Stone", dedicating it to Revere, acknowledging his death that week.

=== Former Raiders and legacy ===
Phil Volk tours with his own band, Fang & The Gang. He was married to Where The Action Is regular Tina Mason from 1967 until her death in 2021.

After leaving the Raiders in 1967, Jim Valley continued to perform and hone his songwriting skills in a variety of acts. He was signed as a solo artist by Dunhill Records and released two singles. He subsequently moved back to his native Northwest, playing with several rock acts including Sweet Talking Jones and the Shoestring Orchestra & Choir. He became an acclaimed and award-winning children's music artist and educator, traveling the world as an emissary of the "Rainbow Planet". Valley continues to work with children, write and record his own albums, as well as performing live.

Joe Correro Jr., the Raiders' drummer from 1967 to 1971, performs as part of the Los Angeles-based Richard Sherman Trio jazz combo. Bassist Mike "Doc" Holiday and guitarist/bassist Charlie Coe made a special guest appearance with Mark Lindsay at a show in Boise, Idaho in 1996. They both reside in Idaho. Righteous Brothers Bill Medley's son, Darrin, sang and performed with Paul Revere & the Raiders.

Another Darren, Darren Dowler, followed Darrin Medley as lead vocalist of the Raiders. Coincidentally, Darren Dowler also sang with Darrin Medley's father's group, the Righteous Brothers Band singing the parts formerly sung by tenor, recording great Bobby Hatfield. Dowler, the current vocalist, has also performed with the Lettermen, the Jordanaires, the Fifth Dimension, Gary Puckett, Mitch Ryder and was the first guitarist for the Backstreet Boys in 1991 before they hit mega stardom. Dowler, also an actor and filmmaker, appeared in such films as Eagle Eye with Billy Bob Thornton and Hancock with Will Smith. In 2014 he starred in, wrote, and directed the films Rock and Roll the Movie and Christmas In Hollywood. In 2014, Revere commissioned Dowler to compose an album of original songs for a new Raider album, the first all original album in 35 years.

After ending his second stint with the Raiders in 1972, drummer Mike "Smitty" Smith moved to Kona, Hawaii and continued performing for several groups in that region. He died of natural causes on March 6, 2001, at age 58.

Drake Levin became an accomplished blues guitarist, playing in and forming numerous groups in the San Francisco Bay Area. He died at his home in San Francisco on July 4, 2009, at the age of 62 after a long battle with cancer.

The group's founder, vocalist and keyboard player Paul Revere died of cancer at his home in Garden Valley, Idaho on October 4, 2014, aged 76. His funeral, held at the Cathedral of the Rockies in Boise, Idaho, was attended by, amongst others, former Idaho Governor Dirk Kempthorne. The group then became "Paul Revere’s Raiders", continuing to perform until April 3, 2022, after which the name was retired.

Carl "Carlo" Driggs, Paul Revere & the Raiders' longest-serving lead singer (a 20-year-plus span), was formerly lead vocalist for Kracker, a band that toured Europe as an opening act for (and had their albums distributed outside America by) the Rolling Stones. He followed this with his tenure in the Latin/disco group Foxy, who scored a no. 1 hit on the Hot R&B/Hip-Hop Songs chart (no. 9 on Billboard's Hot 100) with "Get Off", which was co-written by Driggs. On May 31, 2017, Driggs died of a heart attack at his home in Miami, Florida, at the age of 67.

Keith Allison, who was a member of the Raiders from 1968 to 1975, died at his home in Sherman Oaks, California on November 17, 2021, at the age of 79.

In 2026, it was announced that Phil Volk (Raiders bassist 1965–1967) and Darren Dowler (Raiders vocalist/guitarist 2008–2014) would be forming Raiders Revisited, a tribute group to the band. Also in the group is Bo Donaldson of Bo Donaldson and The Heywoods, and a "surprise celebrity drummer" who is to be announced soon.

== Musical style and influences ==
Paul Revere & the Raiders were classified as a garage rock, proto-punk, rock and roll and pop band. The band's early sound combined fast-paced, guitar-and-vocal-dominated rock with an intimidating R&B flavor. before shifting to a psychedelic pop sound. Quentin Tarantino, who used music from the band in his film Once Upon a Time in Hollywood (2019), categorized Paul Revere & the Raiders as a bubblegum band.

1970's Collage saw the band make an effort to distance themselves from their former image as an AM radio singles band, utilizing "fuzzy guitar noodling, time signature changes, horn charts similar to Blood, Sweat & Tears, cross-fading, and other hip production techniques of the time," according to AllMusic's Cub Koda. Stephen Thomas Erlewine said that the album saw Mark Lindsay "pushing the Raiders toward a harder rock, part way between the fuzz guitars of Grand Funk and horns of Chicago, accentuated by lingering affection for country-rock and soul."

== Legacy ==
Paul Revere & the Raiders and their manager Roger Hart were inducted into the Oregon Music Hall of Fame on 13 October 2007. In 2010 the band was inducted into the Hit Parade Hall of Fame. The garage rock revival and grunge movements—and individual acts such as the Paisley Underground—have cited the Raiders as an influence.

In 2004, "Kicks" ranked no. 400 on Rolling Stone's list of The 500 Greatest Songs of All Time. Additionally, "Just Like Me" is included among The Rock and Roll Hall of Fame's 500 Songs that Shaped Rock and Roll.

Quentin Tarantino's 2019 film Once Upon a Time in Hollywood, set in 1969, featured three of the band's top 20 hits on the Billboard Hot 100 —"Hungry" (1966), "Good Thing" (1966) and "Mr. Sun, Mr. Moon" (1969)—and the 1968 B-side "Theme From It's Happening".

== Former members ==
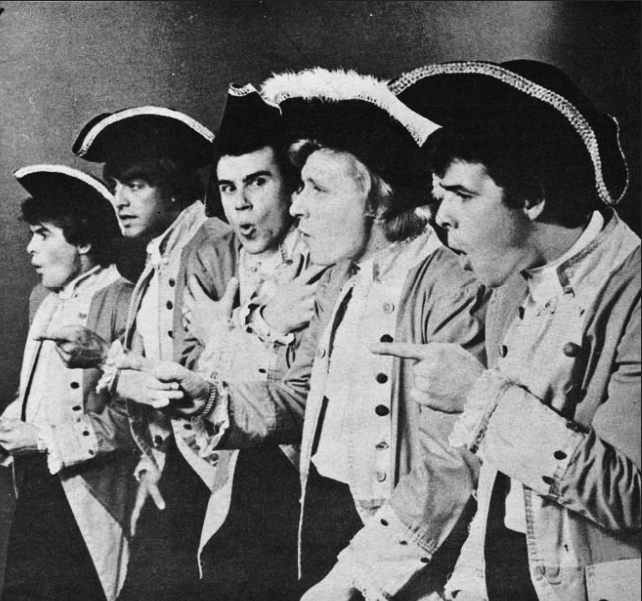
The band in 1965. From left: Smith, Lindsay, Levin, Revere, Volk

- Paul Revere – keyboards (1958–1977; 1978–2014; died 2014)
- Mark Lindsay – vocals, saxophone (1958–1975)
- Robert White – guitar (1958–1961)
- Richard White – guitar (1958–1961)
- William Hibbard – bass guitar (1958–1961)
- Dick Mcgarvin – drums (1958)
- Red Hughes – vocals (1958)
- David Bell – drums (1958–1959)
- Jerry Labrum – drums (1959–1961; died 2012)
- Andrea Loper – vocals (1960; died 2022)
- Leon Russell – keyboards (1961; died 2016)
- Mike "Smitty" Smith – drums (1962–1967, 1971–1972; died 2001)
- Ross Allemang – bass guitar (1962–1963; died 2021)
- Steve West – lead guitar (1962; died 2022)
- Dick Walker – bass (1962–1963)
- Pierre Ouellette (1963)
- Charlie Coe – lead guitar (1963), bass guitar (1967–1968)
- Drake "Kid" Levin – lead guitar (1963–1966, 1967; died 2009)
- Mike "Doc" Holliday – bass guitar (1963–1965)
- Phil "Fang" Volk – bass guitar (1965–1967)
- Jim "Harpo" Valley – lead guitar (1966–1967)
- Freddy Weller – lead guitar (1967–1973)
- Joe Correro Jr. – drums (1967–1971)
- Keith Allison – bass guitar (1968–1975, died 2021)
- Omar Martinez – drums, vocals (1971–1977, 1980–2006)
- Robert Wooley – keyboards (1972–1977)
- Doug Heath – lead guitar (1973–1976, 1978, 1980–2014)
- Ron Foos – bass guitar (1975–1976, 1980–2014)
- Blair Hill – vocals (1978–1980)
- Scott Ellershaw – bass (1978–1980)
- Merwin Kato – drums (1978–1980)
- Michael Bradley – vocals (1980–1983)
- Carlo Driggs – vocals (1983–2004; died 2017)
- Jamie Revere – guitar (1991–1997, 2013–2014)
- Darrin Medley – vocals, drums (2004–2008)
- Matt Fasekas – drums (2006–2009)
- Danny Krause – keyboards, vocals (1980–2014)
- Darren Dowler – vocals, guitar (2008–2014)
- Tommy Scheckel – drums (2009–2014)

== Discography ==
Studio albums

- Like, Long Hair (1961)
- Paul Revere & the Raiders (1963)
- Here They Come! (1965)
- Just Like Us! (1966)
- Midnight Ride (1966)
- The Spirit of '67 (1966)
- Revolution! (1967)
- A Christmas Present...And Past (1967)
- Goin' to Memphis (1968)
- Something Happening (1968)
- Hard 'N' Heavy (with Marshmallow) (1969)
- Alias Pink Puzz (1969)
- Collage (1970)
- Indian Reservation (1971)
- Country Wine (1972)
- Special Edition (1982)
- The Great Raider Reunion (1983)
- Paul Revere Rides Again (1985)

== Bibliography ==
- Hicks, Michael (2000). Sixties Rock: Garage, Psychedelic, and Other Satisfactions. University of Illinois Press. ISBN 0-252-06915-3.
- Blecha, Peter (2009). Sonic Boom: The History of Northwest Rock, from "Louie Louie" to "Smells Like Teen Spirit (1st ed.). New York: Backstreet Books (a imprint of Hal Leonard Corporation). ISBN 978-0-87930-946-6.
- Blecha, Peter (2007). Music in Washington, Seattle and Beyond (Images of America) (1st ed.). Charleston, SC, Chicago, IL, Portsmouth, NH, San Francisco, CA: Arcadia Publishing. ISBN 978-0-7835-4818-0.
