= Dennis the Menace =

Dennis the Menace may refer to either of two comic strip characters that both appeared in March 1951, one in the UK and one in the US.

== United Kingdom character ==
- Dennis the Menace and Gnasher, originally Dennis the Menace, a British comic strip which first appeared in The Beano on 12 March 1951
  - Various television adaptations of the comic strip:
    - Dennis the Menace and Gnasher (1996 TV series) is an animated television series based on the Beano comic strip, known internationally as Dennis And Gnasher.
    - Dennis the Menace and Gnasher (2009 TV series) was released on September 7, 2009.
    - Dennis & Gnasher: Unleashed! (2017 TV series) is the latest animated CGI series, first broadcast in November 2017.

== United States character ==
- Dennis the Menace (U.S. comics), a daily American syndicated newspaper comic strip since March 12, 1951
  - Various television and film adaptations of the comic strip:
    - Dennis the Menace (1959 TV series), a CBS network live action television show
    - Dennis the Menace (1986 TV series), an animated TV series
    - Dennis the Menace: Dinosaur Hunter, a 1987 live-action television film
    - The All-New Dennis the Menace, a 1993 animated television series
    - Dennis the Menace (1993 film), a live-action film released in 1993
      - Dennis the Menace (video game), based on the 1993 film
    - Dennis the Menace Strikes Again, a 1998 direct-to-video sequel of the 1993 film
    - A Dennis the Menace Christmas (2007), a second sequel of the 1993 film

== See also ==
- "Tennis the Menace", a 2001 episode of The Simpsons
- Dennis L. A. White, American actor and rapper who rapped under the name "Dennis da Menace"
