= Mortelle Adèle =

French children's comic book series

Cover of Mortelle Adèle: Parents à vendre, the eighth volume in the series. Here Adèle puts her parents up for sale. Published by Bayard Jeunesse in 2015.

Mortelle Adèle is a French children's comic book series created by Antoine Dole under the pen name Mr Tan. Volumes 1–7 were illustrated by Miss Prickly, and from volume 8 onward by Diane Le Feyer. The series was published from 2012 until 2022 by Bayard Jeunesse, which had acquired editions Tourbillon and Milan. It is now published by Mr Tan & Co, the publishing house founded by Antoine Dole.

Mortelle Adèle follows the daily life of a little girl named Adèle with a strong personality, who casts a cynical and unapologetic gaze on the world around her. There is something of Mafalda and Wednesday Addams in her.

== Background ==
Antoine Dole created the character of Adèle when he was 14 years old and a victim of bullying in middle school. He imagined the character as his opposite: a girl, while he is a boy, who dares to say everything, while he was shy. As a child, not wearing fashionable clothes, Adèle suffered the scorn of the popular kids, led by Jade and Miranda. To fight back, she founded the “Club des Bizarres” (Weirdos' Club), which brought together children who were a little different.

The values defended by Adèle and her creator Antoine Dole include tolerance, acceptance of strangeness, self-assertion, and refusal to conform to social norms.

In April 2018, six years after its launch, the series reached one million copies sold. By the end of 2019, over 2.5 million copies of the comic had been sold, including 1 million in 2019 alone.

In 2020, among the 10 best-selling comic books in France, four volumes were from the Mortelle Adèle series.

In early 2021, 13 albums from the series were listed among the top 20 weekly bestsellers in comics.

By March 2024, the series had reached 18 million readers.

In January 2025, Antoine Dole and Diane Le Feyer, co-authors of Mortelle Adèle, accused their former publisher, Bayard Jeunesse, of betraying their trust and misleading readers by continuing to exploit their work without consent. Bayard Jeunesse denied these accusations, calling them “baseless allegations.”

== Main characters ==
=== Adèle ===
She is the main character of the series. A little red-haired girl with long pigtails, she wears a school uniform reminiscent of those found in British schools. She spends her time conducting wild experiments on her cat. Impertinent and rebellious, she frequently disobeys adults and constantly invents new ways to impose her own rules.

=== Ajax ===
Ajax is Adèle's pet cat and, according to the story in Volume 1 (Tout ça finira mal), Adèle had asked for a baby lion—so her parents introduced Ajax as a “real baby lion,” only for her to discover that he's actually a kitten. Ajax becomes her experiment subject and unwitting punching bag ever since.

=== Her parents ===
They try daily to understand their daughter. Bewildered, they are usually at the mercy of Adèle's whims and struggle to make her obey—she never stops tormenting them.

== Comic books ==
=== Main series volumes ===
1. This Will All End Badly (Tout ça finira mal) (23 February 2012) BnF 42648475
2. Hell Is Other People (L'enfer, c'est les autres) (23 February 2012) BnF 43485790
3. It's Not My Fault! (C'est pas ma faute !) (28 June 2012) BnF 43485791
4. I Hate Love! (J'aime pas l'amour !) (30 September 2012) BnF 43613445
5. Move Over, Uglies! (Poussez-vous les moches !) (6 June 2013) BnF 43666941
6. Monster Talent! (Un talent monstre !) (19 September 2013) BnF 43766150
7. No Mercy for the Nincompoops! (Pas de pitié pour les nazebroques !) (5 June 2014) BnF 43844479
8. Parents for Sale! (Parents à vendre !) (4 December 2014) BnF 44247105
9. Back-to-Slap School (La Rentrée des claques) (2 December 2015)
10. Choubidoulove (Choubidoulove) (25 May 2016) BnF 45052572
11. Smells Like Kibble! (Ça sent la croquette !) (16 November 2016) BnF 45159706
12. Gone Fishing for Noodles! (À la pêche aux nouilles !) (14 June 2017) BnF 45306610
13. Big Slobbery Kisses (Big Bisous Baveux) (25 October 2017) BnF 45387611
14. Atomic Fart (Prout atomique) (23 May 2018) BnF 45508482
15. Funky Furball (Funky Moumoute) (17 October 2018) BnF 45604399
16. Granny-saurus Rex (Jurassic Mamie) (22 May 2019) BnF 45737662
17. Karmageddon! (Karmastrophique !) (10 June 2020) BnF 46553815
18. You, I Totally Zut You! (Toi, je te Zut !) (5 May 2021) BnF 46772051
19. Yuck-Face! (Face de Beurk !) (19 October 2022) BnF 47178442
20. I’m Totally Apocalypsing! (J'apocalypse grave !) (5 October 2023) BnF 473447956
21. Total RecessACTION! (RécréACTION Générale !) (23 May 2024) BnF 47521841
22. Group of Applesauces! (Bande de Compotes !)(9 October 2025)BnF 48677157
23. Nazebrocadabra! (Nazebrocadabra !) (28 May 2026)

=== "Grand Adventures" volumes ===
1. Mortelle Adèle in the Land of Broken Fairytales (Mortelle Adèle au pays des Contes Défaits) (16 October 2019) BnF 45823956
2. Mortelle Adèle and the Galaxy of Weirdos (Mortelle Adèle et la galaxie des Bizarres) (21 October 2020) BnF 47115751
3. Mortelle Adèle – Show Bizarre! (Mortelle Adèle - Show Bizarre !) (20 October 2021) BnF 47136170
4. Mortelle Adèle and the Relics of the Moon-Cat (Mortelle Adèle et les Reliques du Chat-Lune) (2 November 2023) BnF 47449476
5. Mortelle Adèle: In Search of the Grumplegob! (Mortelle Adèle sur les traces du Croquepote !) (17 October 2024)

=== Ajax spin-off series ===
1. Paw-sitively Fine! (Chat va bien !) (22 March 2017) BnF 47453761
2. Paw-sitively Worse! (Chat s'arrange pas !) (18 April 2018) BnF 45485149
3. Catastropurr! (Chaperlipopette) (6 March 2019) BnF 45684157
4. The Little Big Meow-venture of Ajax (La petite grande Chaventure d'Ajax) (4 April 2024) BnF 47521352
5. The Little Big Meow-venture of Ajax 2 (La petite grande Chaventure d'Ajax 2) (3 April 2025) (BNF not yet available)

== Novels ==
1. Once Mortel, Always Mortel (Mortel un jour, Mortel toujours) (27 May 2020) BnF 46529760
2. Mischief Starts Now (Les bêtises, c'est maintenant) (24 March 2021) BnF 46722176
3. Rise Up, Weirdos (Debout les bizarres) (31 August 2022)
4. V.I.B. – Very Important Weirdos (V.I.B. - Very Important Bizarres) (1 June 2023)

== Merchandise and spin-offs ==
=== Board games ===
- Deadly Challenges (Défis mortels) (October 2017)
- Move Over, Uglies! (Poussez-vous les moches !) (October 2018)

=== Game books – L'Extra Mortelle Adèle series ===
1. A Night with My Babyslaughter (Une nuit avec ma baby-sittrice) (5 June 2014)
2. Jade’s Birthday (L'Anniversaire de Jade) (17 June 2015)
3. The Revolt of the Weirdos! (La Révolte des bizarres !) (15 June 2016)
4. The Forbidden Experiment (L'Expérience interdite) (7 June 2017)

=== Activity books ===
1. Make Your Own Comic with Mortelle Adèle (Fais ta BD avec Mortelle Adèle) (18 November 2015)
2. Make Your Own Movie with Mortelle Adèle (Fais ton cinéma avec Mortelle Adèle) (22 November 2017)

=== Companion books ===
1. The Weirdos’ Journal (Le Journal Des Bizarres) (6 April 2023)

=== Music ===
In 2018, singer Aldebert featured Mortelle Adèle in the song Move Over, Uglies! (Poussez‑vous les moches !) on his album Enfantillages, les 10 ans; the voice of Adèle in the track was performed by actress Dorothée Pousséo.

Aldebert later collaborated with Antoine Dole (lyrics) to produce a full album titled Mortelle Adèle – Show Bizarre, released on 20 October 2021, again with Dorothée Pousséo as Adèle's voice, joined by actors such as Emmanuel Curtil and Claire Guyot.

This was followed by a Christmas album titled 365 Days to Be Good (365 jours pour être sage), released on 29 November 2022, composed by Vincent Blaviel and written by Antoine Dole. In March 2024, a four‑track EP Very Important Bizarres! was released to accompany a free anti‑bullying booklet made available online by the publisher Mr Tan & Co.

=== Animated series ===
An animated series is in preproduction as of 2022. After voicing Adèle in songs from the franchise, Dorothée Pousséo was selected to voice the main character. The broadcast of the series, which will be titled Mortelle Adèle like the comic book, the project was announced in 2020, GO-N Productions, which had acquired the adaptation rights to make the animated series with 78 episodes, each lasting 7 minutes, and it premiered on Gulli on November 14th, 2026.

== See also ==
- La terrible Fifí – Spanish comic strip created by Nené Estivill in 1958, featuring a manipulative upper-class girl who humiliates adults with sarcasm and cruelty.
- Wednesday Addams – Fictional goth girl from The Addams Family, known for her dark humor and macabre and deadpan wit.
- Titeuf – French comic character famous for his awkward yet mischievous behavior.
- Dennis the Menace – Mischievous schoolboy who terrorizes adults.
- Zipi y Zape – Spanish twins known for constant mischief, published by Editorial Bruguera.
- Calvin and Hobbes – American comic strip about a hyper-imaginative, often rebellious boy.
