= Zipi y Zape =

Spanish comic book characters

- Cover of Super Humor album by Ramis and Cera
- Created by: José Escobar

Publication information
- Publisher: Editorial Bruguera; Ediciones B
- Original language: Spanish
- Genre: Humor/comedy
- Publication date: 1947–2002

Zipi y Zape are the names of two Spanish comic book characters created by José Escobar in 1947, and of their eponymous strip. Their name is derived from the Spanish word zipizape, meaning "turmoil" or "chaos."

== Characters ==
Zipi and Zape Zapatilla are two young, mischievous, energetic, football-obsessed twins who do poorly in school. They are distinguished merely by their hair colour; Zipi is blond, while Zape is black-haired. Other featured characters are their father, Don Pantuflo Zapatilla, a professor of Philately and Colombophilia (pantuflo/a and zapatilla are both Spanish names for slippers); their hard-pressed mother, Doña Jaimita; Don Minervo, their strict teacher; Peloto, the teacher's pet (and thus the twins’ enemy); Sapientín (sometimes called "Pitagorin", as a reference to Pythagoras), their genius cousin and Pepe and Felisa Plómez, the extremely annoying friends of their parents, whose undesirable visits they try to avoid or shorten.

Their stories are usually short, about one to eight pages long, but occasionally some are longer, about 44 or 48 pages, like "El tonel del tiempo" (The barrel of time) o "El laboratorio secreto" (The secret laboratory). They are humorous, based on the twins' antics and their effects, since often they backfire spectacularly, including popular culture elements like aliens and mad scientists.

== Publication history ==
Escobar's stories were published by Editorial Bruguera in the Pulgarcito magazine, which contained several comic strips. They later got their own magazine, ZipiZape, which also contained several comic strips apart from the title one. The strips were later compiled in softcover and hardcover albums. When Bruguera went bankrupt, its catalogue was bought by Ediciones B, the current owners of the characters rights. These vintage stories can be found in softcover under the "Colección Olé" label and in hardcover under the "Super Humor" label.

The series continues after Escobar's death, now in the hands of cartoonists Juan Carlos Ramis and Joaquín Cera who have put them forward to the 21st century. Zipi and Zape are still domestic terrorists, but now are fans of the UEFA Champions League and make good use of the Internet. Their stories are published directly on hardcover albums under the "Magos del Humor" label. Several of these albums are later collected in the wider, hardcover "Super Humor" albums.

== Merchandise ==
The popularity of Zipi y Zape has resulted in merchandise, including video games, some animated shorts in the 60s and 70s that are still unknown and refused to be acknowledged, an animated TV show in 2003 and two live-action movies, Las aventuras de Zipi y Zape, in 1981 and Zip & Zap and the Marble Gang, in 2013. José Escobar made some films which projected in his invention, Cine Skob.

The television series was produced by BRB Internacional. The series was a "double challenge" to adapt according to Claudio Biern Boyd, as the characters had to be animated first and adapted to the social norms of the early 2000s, with the addition of skateboards and computers, as well as newer slang.

== See also ==
- La terrible Fifí – Spanish comic strip created by Nené Estivill in 1958, featuring a cunning bourgeois girl who manipulates and humiliates adults for fun.
- Mortelle Adèle – French comic series starring a rebellious and sarcastic girl who delights in shocking adults.
- Dennis the Menace – British schoolboy from The Beano, known for causing mayhem and defying adults.
- Titeuf – French comic character who navigates awkward childhood situations with humor and irreverence.
