= Lily (magazine) =

Spanish women's magazine

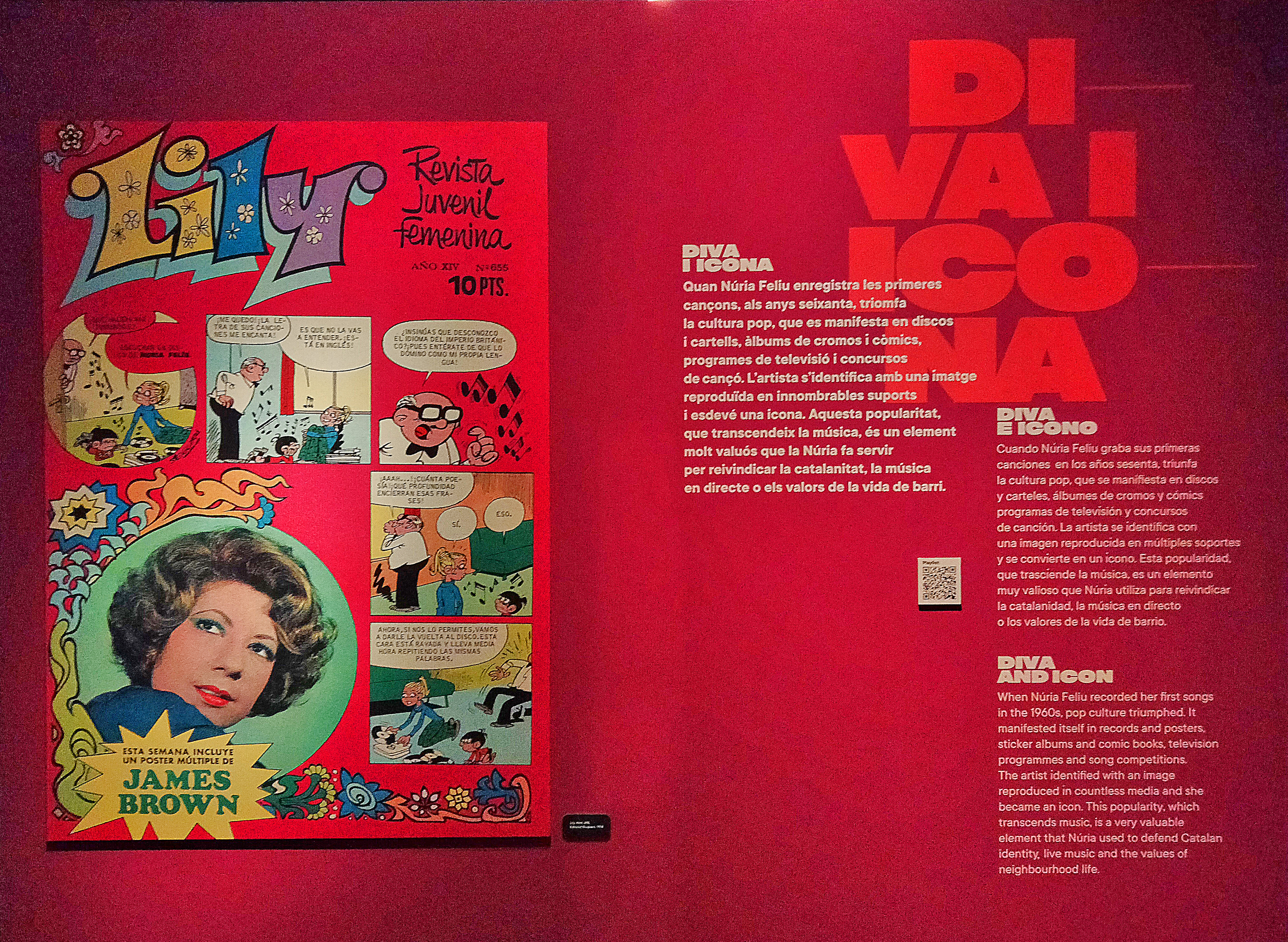
- Editor-in-chief: Jorge Gubern Ribalta
- Categories: Women's magazine
- Frequency: Weekly
- Format: 18'5 x 26'5
- Circulation: 42,430
- Publisher: Editorial Bruguera
- First issue: 1970; 56 years ago
- Final issue Number: 1985; 41 years ago 1,208
- Country: Spain
- Based in: Barcelona
- Language: Spanish

Cover of Lily Especial Esther No. 5 (1978), illustrated by Purita Campos.

Lily was a women's magazine published in Spain by Editorial Bruguera between 1970 and 1985. It was one of the last successful comic magazines (tebeos) aimed at young girls in its domestic market.

Its editor‑in‑chief was Jorge Gubern Ribalta.

== Publication history ==
Lily took over the place in Bruguera's comics line left vacant by the discontinued magazines Sissi and Blanca, to such an extent that its first issue was numbered 444, directly continuing the numbering from the last issue of Sissi, which had ended with issue 443 in 1967.

During its first year, the magazine reached an average circulation of 42,430 copies per issue.

In 1976, Bruguera launched the spin-off title Super Lily.

== Features ==
Lily was published in vertical format with 20 pages and sold for 5 pesetas. It avoided the sentimental themes that had dominated earlier girls’ comics and instead emphasized action and humor.

In addition to joke sections, horoscopes, music, film and television news, and puzzles, it included the following comic series, many of them from British syndication:

Years	Issues	Title	Serial storylines	Author(s)	Origin
1970–1985	444–	Lily	—	Roberto Segura	Original
1970–	444, 445	Julita	—	—	Syndication International
1970–	444, 445	La terrible Fifí	—	Nene Estivill	—
1970–	444, 445	Caty, la chica gato	—	Giorgio Giorgetti	Syndication International
1970–	444, 445	Fina	—	Reg Parlett	Syndication International
1970–	444, 445	Cristina y sus amigas	—	T. Ardanuy / Cuyas	—
1970–	444, 445	Los extraordinarios relatos del tío Arthur	—	—	Syndication International
—	—	Tina y Rosi	—	Isabel Penalva	—
—	—	Dorita	—	—	Syndication International
1974	631–	Esther	—	Philip Douglas / Purita Campos	Syndication International
1975	—	Lina	La caravana de la cólera	Greg / Paul Cuvelier	Tintin
1981	1045	Emma es encantadora	—	Trini Tinturé / Andreu Martín	—
1985	—	Candy Candy	—	Kyōko Mizuki / Yumiko Igarashi	Manga

== Reception ==
Tino Regueira suggests that its enduring success may be explained by the close connection it maintained with its readers.

== Bibliography ==
- Cuadrado, Jesús (2000). Atlas español de la cultura popular: De la historieta y su uso 1873–2000 (Spanish Atlas of Popular Culture: On Comics and Their Use 1873–2000). Vol. 2. Madrid: Ediciones Sinsentido / Fundación Germán Sánchez Ruipérez. ISBN 84-89384-23-1.
- Delhom, José María (1989). Catálogo del tebeo en España. 1865–1980 (Catalogue of Spanish Comics. 1865–1980). Barcelona: Círculo del Cómic, S.A. / CESA. ISBN 8486404029.
- Fontes, Ignacio; Menéndez, Manuel Ángel (2004). El parlamento de papel. Las revistas españolas en la transición democrática (The Paper Parliament: Spanish Magazines in the Democratic Transition). Asociación de la Prensa de Madrid. ISBN 84-87641-19-9.
- Guiral, Antoni (2007). Los tebeos de nuestra infancia: La Escuela Bruguera (1964–1986) (The Comics of Our Childhood: The Bruguera School (1964–1986)). Colección Magnum nº 7. Barcelona: Ediciones El Jueves, S.A. ISBN 978-84-9741-589-7. Legal deposit: B-50353-2007.
- Guiral, Antoni (2010). 100 años de Bruguera: De El Gato Negro a Ediciones B (100 Years of Bruguera: From El Gato Negro to Ediciones B). Barcelona: Ediciones B. ISBN 9788466638166. Legal deposit: B-24625-2010.
- Ramírez, Juan Antonio (1975). El "comic" femenino en España: Arte sub y anulación (Women's Comics in Spain: Sub-Art and Annulment). Colección Divulgación Universitaria, Arte y Literatura, no. 78. Madrid: Cuadernos para el Diálogo. ISBN 84-229-0177-3. Legal deposit: M. 8.752–1975.
- Regueira, Tino (2005). Guía visual de la Editorial Bruguera 1 (1940–1986). Barcelona: Ediciones Glénat S.L. ISBN 84-8449-664-3. Legal deposit: B-2551-05.
