= La terrible Fifí =

Cover of La terrible Fifí.

La terrible Fifí ("The Terrible Fifí") was a Spanish comic strip series created by Nené Estivill for the magazine Pulgarcito published by Editorial Bruguera in 1958. It is considered one of the "enfant terrible" characters of classic Spanish comics, alongside Zipi y Zape and Angelito.

== Publication history ==
La terrible Fifí was published in the magazines Pulgarcito and Lily.

== Plot and characters ==
Fifí is a clever and perverse girl from the upper bourgeoisie, who manipulates those around her in order to humiliate them, especially:

- Melanio Repelillo, the boyfriend of her aunt Ofelia.
- Don Ricachini, a stereotypical wealthy man eager for social recognition and Melanio's boss.

Other less frequent characters include:

- Her father Don Fermín and her mother;
- Her brother Papiolo,
- And Simón, Don Ricachini's servant.

A running gag at the end of the strip features a victim pleading for help from Don Sordete, who—true to his name ("sordete" is diminutive for "sordo": "deaf" in Spanish, "Don" means "Sir")—cannot hear anything and ends by insisting that it's imperative for Kubala to play (a popular footballer of the era).

Occasionally, Don Chafaderete appears as well, explaining the situation to him.

== Reception ==
As historian Juan Antonio Ramírez explains, this series—despite appearing to contrast with Agamenón (bourgeoisie versus peasants, wickedness versus kindness)—shares with it the portrayal of a world on the verge of disappearing in the face of the emerging consumer society.

== Bibliography ==
- Altarriba, Antonio (2001). La España del Tebeo: La historieta española de 1940 a 2000 (volume 2). Madrid: Espasa-Calpe. ISBN 84-239-2545-5. Legal deposit: M.45.522–2001.
- Cuadrado, Jesús (2000). Atlas español de la cultura popular: De la historieta y su uso 1873–2000 (Atlas of Spanish Popular Culture: Comics and Their Use, 1873–2000). Vol. 2. Madrid: Ediciones Sinsentido / Fundación Germán Sánchez Ruipérez. ISBN 84-89384-23-1.
- Ramírez, Juan Antonio (1975). La historieta cómica de postguerra (Postwar Comic Strips). Madrid: Editorial Cuadernos para el Diálogo, Colección Memoria y Comunicación. ISBN 8422960109. Legal deposit: M. 38.325–1975.
- Vázquez de Parga, Salvador (1980). Los cómics del franquismo (The Comics of Francoist Spain). Barcelona: Editorial Planeta, Colección Textos no. 59. ISBN 84-320-0629-7. Legal deposit: B. 28047–1980.

== See also ==
- Mortelle Adèle – French comic heroine who delights in shocking and provoking adults.
- Wednesday Addams – Fictional goth girl from The Addams Family, known for her dark humor and macabre and deadpan wit.
- Titeuf – French comic character famous for his awkward yet mischievous behavior.
- Dennis the Menace – Mischievous schoolboy who terrorizes adults.
- Zipi y Zape – Spanish twins known for constant mischief, published by Editorial Bruguera.
- Calvin and Hobbes – American comic strip about a hyper-imaginative, often rebellious boy.
