= Charley Jones' Laugh Book Magazine =

American magazine

Al Wiseman's cover for the March 1953 issue

Charley Jones' Laugh Book Magazine, aka Charley Jones' Laugh Book and Laugh Book, was a monthly digest-size cartoon and joke magazine published by Charley E. Jones at 438 North Main Street in Wichita, Kansas. Edited by Charley Jones, Ceora K. Raymond and Ken Berglund, it ran from 1943 into the mid-1960s. An earlier version was known as Laugh Book Magazine. Offering "something for everyone", it sometimes displayed the subtitle America's Foremost Humor Magazine.

Jones began publishing in 1933 with Downtown Wichita, which he called a "tattle-tale sheet'". With World War II underway, his distribution of Latrine Gazette to Army bases was so successful that he recycled the material into yet another publication, HEADliners, aimed at Navy men.

After Jones hired the former sales manager for Autopoint Pencil Company, the two made a deal with Otto Stoll of Chicago's Stoll Distribution Company (which handled Captain Billy's Whiz Bang), and they launched Charley Jones' Laugh Book in 1943 with an order of 20,000 copies to be distributed by Stoll. Initially published by Wichita's Jayhawk Press in Wichita, the publisher in 1944 was given as Joste Publishing Company in Wichita.

Soon it was national, reaching a peak of 54,000 and making a switch to distribution by Hearst, which delivered the magazine to newsstands throughout small-town America. During the 1950s, it continued to be widely circulated to military bases where a single copy was passed around, and thus the readership increased well beyond the print run.

The magazine had a staff of 11 employees, but as sales and his health diminished, Jones moved the operation into his own home (with a staff of two). In 1964, when Jones moved to New Mexico for his health, he continued to publish a monthly magazine, Picturesque New Mexico. On May 27, 1966, he died during open heart surgery in Albuquerque, New Mexico.

== Jokes ==
Many jokes were contributed by readers. The magazine paid $25 for a cartoon, 50 cents for a joke and 25 cents a line for light verse. Longer material paid two cents a word. A typical joke: "Many people call a doctor when all they want is an audience." In addition to the jokes and cartoons, the format included letters from readers, pen pal notices and a "Letter from Charley". In an apparent trade-off, the magazine ran photos from Earl Wilson's column, and Wilson occasionally reprinted Laugh Book jokes in his column.

== Cartoonists ==
The magazine's cartoonists included Jack Lohr, Bill Power, Dick Smolinski, Paul Murry and Bill Ward. Bob Miller and Dennis the Menace comic book illustrator Al Wiseman created the spicy cartoon covers.

== Archives ==
Copies of Charley Jones' Laugh Book are on file at the Kinsey Institute.
