= A Dennis the Menace Christmas =

- DVD cover
- Directed by: Ron Oliver
- Written by: Kathleen Laccinole
- Based on: A Christmas Carol by Charles Dickens Characters John Hughes Dennis the Menace by Hank Ketcham
- Produced by: Steven J. Wolfe
- Starring: Maxwell Perry Cotton; Robert Wagner; Kim Schraner; Jack Noseworthy; Godfrey; Louise Fletcher
- Cinematography: C. Kim Miles
- Edited by: Zack Arnold
- Music by: Peter Allen; James Covell
- Distributed by: Warner Bros. Pictures (Note: Released under the Warner Premiere label.)
- Release date: November 6, 2007
- Running time: 84 minutes
- Country: United States
- Language: English

A Dennis the Menace Christmas is a 2007 direct-to-video film directed by Ron Oliver, written by Kathleen Lacunal and starring Maxwell Perry Cotton and Robert Wagner.

The film is based on the comic strip by Hank Ketcham. It serves as a standalone sequel to Dennis the Menace and Dennis the Menace Strikes Again. The plot is based on Charles Dickens's 1843 novella A Christmas Carol. Composer Peter Allen was nominated for a Leo Award for his score for the film.

So far, it is currently the last adaptation of the comic strip to be released.

== Plot ==
The film opens up with Dennis crashing his bike into Mr. Wilson. Mr. Wilson wakes up and realizes that he is having a nightmare. In the meanwhile, Dennis gets his bike and races his enemy, Jack Bratcher to school in time for the Thanksgiving pageant. On the way, Dennis's bike falls apart and Dennis falls down which makes Jack call him a loser. At the pageant, Dennis opens the turkey's cage assuming it was thirsty. When Dennis comes back, the turkey is missing from its cage. The turkey flies around and makes a mess of the pageant and Jack's father, David Bratcher encourages his son to throw the bake sale products at everyone. Dennis' principal threatens Dennis' parents with the Dennis Clause and force them to pay for Jack's insurance policies. At home, Henry tells Dennis that he must take responsibility for his situation. Dennis promises to work it out by washing windows, doing the dishes and more which Alice and Henry say no to at each suggestion.

A few days later, Dennis sends an email to Santa Claus to give him a new bicycle and attends the secret Santa event at his house. He pulls Mr. Wilson's name from the hat and starts wondering what to give him for Christmas. At school, Dennis creates a Christmas spirit list with Presents, Christmas tree, cookies, lights and Santa Claus. On the next day, Alice takes a new gift wrapping job at a department store and takes Dennis with her. He creates a balloon with bows on it which an old lady sits on and gets stuck to her bottom. When Dennis attempts to retrieve the balloon, the old lady swings her purse at him and knocks down the Santa Claus set up around her. Alice takes Dennis away from the mall. Later during the afternoon, Alice leaves Dennis with Mr. and Mrs. Wilson who happily babysit him. Mrs Wilson has to run errands and leaves Dennis and Mr. Wilson alone for a few hours. Dennis wanders Mr. Wilson's house looking for the perfect gift for Mr. Wilson. However, he comes across Mr. Wilson's stamp collection and plays around with his stamps. Mrs. Wilson returns from her errands and finds Dennis not in the living room with Mr. Wilson. They go upstairs only to find Dennis ruining Mr. Wilson's antique stamps which make him extremely angry and not want Dennis anywhere near him.

Alice and Henry try to assure Dennis that he is a good kid and tell him to think hard and he can figure out the right gift to give Mr. Wilson. Dennis then decides to give Mr. Wilson the Christmas spirit. The first thing on the list is presents. Dennis and his friends go shopping for gifts to give to Mr. Wilson. When Dennis gives Mr. Wilson his gifts, he cheers up a lot and becomes happy until Dennis accidentally trips him and breaks his arm.

The second thing on the list is a Christmas tree. While Mr. Wilson is at the hospital, Dennis and his friends find a pine tree on the streets and put it in Mr. Wilson's living room through the window assuming that he will be happy. When Mr. Wilson returns from the hospital, he sees the tree which is also when a whole bunch of cops show up during the night thinking that Mr. Wilson stole the tree. The cops then arrest Mr. Wilson.

In the next morning, Mr. Wilson is bailed out of jail. The third thing on Dennis' Christmas spirit list is cookies. So while Mrs. Wilson goes out to buy pills for Mr. Wilson, Dennis goes to work by baking cookies for Mr. Wilson. When Dennis gives the cookies to Mr. Wilson, he eats them and cheers up. However, Dennis used a variety of unusual ingredients which give Mr. Wilson food poisoning so he goes back to the hospital to get his stomach pumped.

The fourth thing on the Christmas Spirit list is lights. While Mr. Wilson is at the hospital, Dennis and his friends find Christmas lights and put them on Mr. Wilson's house to make it beautiful. Later during the evening, Mr. Wilson returns from the hospital and is happy to see his house decorated with Christmas lights at first. But when the lights turn on, it starts a fire. It makes him angry and he forces Dennis' parents to pay for the damage which was caused by the fire.

The next day is Christmas Eve which is Dennis' last chance to find the right gift for Mr. Wilson. The last thing on the Christmas Spirit list is Santa Claus. Jack goes up to him saying that tomorrow is the day he will race against Dennis on their bikes. Later during the evening, Dennis takes the same Santa Claus from the mall and puts him at Mr. Wilson's house. However, Mr. Wilson becomes angry when he sees Santa Claus stuck in his chimney and mispronouncing his name as Mr. Winston. Dennis then makes an apology card for Mr. Wilson, but he loses his temper by angrily telling him to stay away from him, his property and his wife. He also tells Dennis not to say Mr Wilson's name and that there is no such thing as Santa Claus. Dennis also hopes with his good deeds, that he will receive a new bicycle for Christmas.

Dennis leaves Mr. Wilson's house in tears after becoming heartbroken which is when the scene switches to The Santa Claus in a police car. He magically escapes custody. He turns out to be The Angel of Christmas Past, Present and Future who intervenes to help save Christmas for the Mitchell and Wilson families.

The Angel takes Mr. Wilson to his childhood home in the 1950s, where he runs to his bathtub to put his neighbor's model boats which he thinks are in the wrong place, when the nozzle breaks and floods the room, which causes his neighbor to lose his temper at him.

The Angel then takes him back to the present, and Mr. Wilson sees Alice and Henry do not have enough money for presents as a result of having to hand over so much money to the Wilsons in order to fix the damage which is caused by Dennis' behaviour and Dennis starting to have a hatred for Christmas after thinking what Mr. Wilson said to him. He also notices how depressed his wife is because she really wants to celebrate Christmas, but due to her husband's hatred for the holidays they are unable to. He soon realises he must put an end to it.

Finally, the Angel takes him to the future, where it is bleak and the atmosphere requires SPF 800 sunscreen because of global warming since 2019. His house is abandoned, and Dennis is shown to be old, lonely, childless, and having a dislike of Christmas (and, in the process, repeating what Mr. Wilson says to him — and other kids — about Christmas). Mr. Wilson realises that what he has said is not true after discovering his mistake. It is the final epiphany that convinces Mr. Wilson to change his outlook on Christmas and makes him vow to celebrate Christmas with others.

Mr. Wilson then wakes up to find himself back in the present, and spreads his Christmas joy around the neighborhood. Dennis wakes up in the next morning with a tree loaded with gifts. Mr. Wilson helps Alice and Henry with finances, talks to Dennis and cheers him up with holiday joy (while also apologising to him for what he has said). Mr. Wilson and his wife have a big Christmas tree in their living room, and his childhood fishing pole is purchased online. Dennis races with Jack on his new bicycle, and loses. Jack and Dennis become friends. And for the first time in thirty years, it snows in the community.

The film ends with the Angel sitting on a roof reflecting on how much he loves happy endings before popping back to the North Pole, and the kids riding their bikes before Dennis accidentally crashes into Mr. Wilson.

== Cast ==
- Maxwell Perry Cotton as Dennis Mitchell
- Robert Wagner as George Wilson
- Louise Fletcher as Martha Wilson
- Godfrey as Bob the Angel
- China Anne McClain as Margaret Wade
- Kim Schraner as Alice Mitchell
- George Newbern as Henry Mitchell
- Jake Beale as Joey McDonald
- Isaac Durnford as Jack Bratcher
- Heidi Hayes as Gina Gillotti
- Jack Noseworthy as David Bratcher
- Elliot Larson as Georgie
- Walter Massey as Wilbur Newman

== Critical reception ==
Screen Rant said the film was similar in tone to the 2021 HBO Max movie 8-Bit Christmas and that "There are cheerful moments abound in a Christmas comedy, too."

The A.V. Club, "Simultaneously cloyingly sweet and excruciatingly crass."

== See also ==
- List of Christmas films
