= The All-New Dennis the Menace =

- Also known as: Dennis the Menace; The Incredible Dennis the Menace
- Created by: Sean Roche; Bob Shellhorn
- Developed by: Sean Roche
- Written by: Hank Ketcham; Sean Roche; Lori Crawford
- Directed by: Bob Shellhorn
- Voices of: Adam Wylie; Jeannie Elias; Dan Gilvezan; Greg Burson; June Foray; Katie Leigh; Anna Mathias
- Music by: Tom Worrall
- Countries of origin: United States; Italy; Spain
- Original languages: English; Italian; Spanish
- No. of episodes: 13

Production
- Executive producer: Andy Heyward
- Producer: Bob Shellhorn
- Running time: 22 minutes
- Production companies: DIC Entertainment, L.P. Reteitalia; Saerom Animation (animation)

Original release
- Network: CBS (United States); Telecinco (Spain)
- Release: September 18 – December 11, 1993

The All-New Dennis the Menace is an animated series based on the comic strip by Hank Ketcham that aired from September 18 to December 11, 1993 on CBS (while the 1986 series was still airing in syndication).

It capitalizes on the success of a live-action film adaptation of the comic strip, released in 1993.

Produced by DIC Entertainment, L.P. and Reteitalia, S.p.A., in association with Spanish network Telecinco, it, like the latter, was sponsored by General Mills.

== Cast ==
- Adam Wylie as Dennis Mitchell
- Greg Burson as George Wilson
- Jeannie Elias as Margaret Wade and Peebee Kappa
- June Foray as Martha Wilson
- Dan Gilvezan as Henry Mitchell and Ruff
- Katie Leigh as Gina Gillotti and Joey McDonald
- Anna Mathias as Alice Mitchell

=== Additional voices ===
- Jack Angel
- Allyce Beasley
- Bob Bergen
- Gregg Berger
- Eileen Brennan
- Rodger Bumpass
- Frank Buxton
- Hamilton Camp
- Brian Cummings
- Jennifer Darling
- Linda Gary
- Michael Gough
- Danny Mann
- Mona Marshall
- Chuck McCann
- Michael Mish
- Pat Musick as Chuck Millman
- Wayne Powers
- Jan Rabson
- Hal Rayle
- Eugene Roche
- Roger Rose
- Maggie Roswell
- Jack Roth
- John Rubinow
- Kevin Schon
- Roger Scott
- Susan Silo
- David H. Sterry
- Doug Stone

== Episodes ==
No.	Title	Written by	Original release date
1	"Brother Rats"	Sean Roche	September 18, 1993
2	"Hospitality"	Doug Molitor	September 25, 1993
3	"It's a Guy Thing"	Sean Roche & Barry O'Brien	October 2, 1993
4	"Pains, Trains & Automobiles"	Julianne Klemm	October 9, 1993
5	"Like Master, Like Mutt"	David Bennett Carren & J. Larry Carroll	October 16, 1993
6	"Lock, Stock & Grumble"	Eleanor Burian-Mohr & Jack Hanrahan	October 23, 1993
7	"Caution: Boy at Work"	Bruce Shelly & Reed Shelly	October 30, 1993
8	"Fortune Fix"	Francis Moss	November 6, 1993
9	"Navy Destroyer"	Sean Roche	November 13, 1993
10a	"Yankee Doodle Dennis"	David Weimers	November 20, 1993
10b	"Mom's Helper"	Francis Moss	November 20, 1993
11	"Wish You Weren't Here"	Bruce Shelly & Reed Shelly; Story by : David Weimers	November 27, 1993
12a	"Pig Out"	Jess Winfield	December 4, 1993
12b	"Battle of the Bonding"	Doug Molitor	December 4, 1993
13	"Dennis the Genius"	Ed Ferrara & Kevin Murphy	December 11, 1993

== Background and production ==
=== Music ===
The series' opening theme was adapted from the overture to Wolfgang Amadeus Mozart's opera The Marriage of Figaro. The series' score also consists of classical music adaptations from overtures, such as the one from Gioachino Rossini's The Barber of Seville.

== Release ==
=== United States ===
Buena Vista Home Video released two single-episode VHS tapes in 1994, featuring the episodes "It's a Guy Thing" and "Hospitality".

=== Australia ===
Roadshow Entertainment released several VHS tapes in Australia in the mid-90s.

Magna Pacific released all 13 episodes (except "Pig Out" and "Battle of the Bonding") on three separate region 4 DVD volumes in Australia in 2004,

=== United Kingdom ===
Anchor Bay UK released a single DVD volume in June 2004, containing the first four episodes of the series. This DVD was reissued under Anchor Bay's "Price Wise" budget DVD imprint in August 2006.

In June 2005, Avenue Entertainment released two DVD volumes containing two episodes each.

== Other media ==
=== Dennis the Menace: Cruise Control ===
In 2002, DIC produced a television film as part of their DIC Movie Toons series, titled Dennis the Menace: Cruise Control. It originally premiered on television on Nickelodeon on October 27, and was released on VHS and DVD shortly afterward by MGM Home Entertainment, and later aired internationally on Disney Channel and Toon Disney. Instead of duplicating the look and feel of this show, it harked back to the character designs from the better-known 1986 Dennis the Menace series, also produced by DIC. It marks the first Dennis the Menace project released after Hank Ketcham's death on June 1, 2001.
