= Dennis the Menace (film) =

1993 American comedy film by Nick Castle

- Theatrical release poster by Drew Struzan
- Directed by: Nick Castle
- Written by: John Hughes
- Based on: Dennis the Menace by Hank Ketcham
- Produced by: John Hughes; Richard Vane
- Starring: Christopher Lloyd; Joan Plowright; Lea Thompson; Paul Winfield; Mason Gamble; Walter Matthau
- Cinematography: Thomas E. Ackerman
- Edited by: Alan Heim
- Music by: Jerry Goldsmith
- Production companies: Hughes Entertainment; Hank Ketcham Enterprises
- Distributed by: Warner Bros.
- Release date: June 25, 1993
- Running time: 96 minutes
- Country: United States
- Language: English
- Budget: $35 million
- Box office: $117 million

Dennis the Menace is a 1993 American comedy film based on the Hank Ketcham comic strip. It was directed by Nick Castle and written by John Hughes.

The plot concerns the misadventures of the mischievous child Dennis Mitchell (Mason Gamble) who menaces his next door neighbor George Wilson (Walter Matthau), usually hangs out with his friends Joey McDonald (Kellen Hathaway) and Margaret Wade (Amy Sakasitz) and is followed everywhere by his dog Ruff. Jeannie Russell, who plays Margaret in the 1959–1963 TV series, makes a cameo appearance.

Released in the United States on June 25, 1993, by Warner Bros. under its Family Entertainment label, the film received generally negative reviews from critics but was a commercial success, grossing $117 million on a $35 million budget. A direct-to-video sequel, Dennis the Menace Strikes Again, was released in 1998 and a second sequel, A Dennis the Menace Christmas, was released in 2007.

== Plot ==
Five-year-old Dennis Mitchell is a constant source of mischief, especially to his retired next door neighbor, George Wilson. One day, George pretends to be asleep to avoid Dennis, who mistakes this for illness and shoots an aspirin into his mouth with a slingshot. Dennis's parents, Henry and Alice, try to discipline him as they get ready for work and leave him with his best friend Joey McDonald at the home of their unloved classmate, Margaret Wade. As they fix up an abandoned treehouse in the woods, itinerant thief Switchblade Sam arrives in town.

Vacuuming spilled paint in the garage, Dennis inadvertently shoots a glob of it onto George's barbecue grill; tasting it, he suspects Dennis. Henry and Alice leave Dennis with teenage babysitter Polly, who invites her boyfriend, Mickey. Sneaking outside, Dennis pranks them by ringing the doorbell and hiding until Mickey tapes a thumbtack to it. George investigates the vacuum in the Mitchells' garage and accidentally shoots himself in the gonads with a golf ball. Hoping to confront the Mitchells, George pricks his thumb on the tack. Mistaking him for the prankster, Polly and Mickey douse George with water and flour.

Dennis plays with George's dentures, loses the two front incisors and replaces them with Chiclets before George has his picture taken for the local newspaper. Henry and Alice need to leave on respective business trips but are unable to find anyone willing to babysit Dennis, except Martha, George's wife. George is infuriated that Dennis has replaced his nasal spray with mouthwash and the latter with toilet cleanser. Dennis lets his dog Ruff in the Wilsons' house, leading George to mistake him for Martha. In the attic, Dennis's carelessness causes George to slip on mothballs. Meanwhile, Sam commits a string of burglaries in town and is noticed by Chief Bennett, who tells him to leave the area or be arrested.

George has been chosen to host his garden club's "Summer Floraganza", having spent almost 40 years growing a rare orchid that will finally bloom that night. During the party, Dennis presses the garage door button and it opens, upending the entire dessert table. While the Wilsons and their guests await the flower's nocturnal display, Sam breaks into the Wilsons' house and steals George's antique coin collection. Dennis, who heard Sam and discovers the empty safe, alerts George, distracting everyone from the flower's brief blooming, and it dies soon after. Furious and unaware he has been burgled, George coldly chastises Dennis, who flees to the woods and is caught by Sam. Henry and Alice arrive home to learn Dennis has disappeared, prompting a town-wide search. Even a guilt-ridden George joins the search after realizing Dennis was telling the truth about the burglary.

Sam prepares to leave town with Dennis as an unsuspecting hostage. Showing him the proper way to tie him up, Dennis handcuffs Sam, loses the key, unintentionally bludgeons him and sets him on fire. Just as Dennis discovers George's stolen coins and realizes Sam is a burglar, the latter attempts to stab Dennis but is snared in a rope caught by a passing train.

The next day, Dennis returns home with Sam and George's recovered coins. Chief Bennett arrives and alleges to know Sam was a criminal all along. While Sam is being arrested, Dennis's friends show up and are happy Dennis is safe and sound. Dennis returns the knife to Sam but Chief Bennett slams the patrol car door on Sam's hand, causing him to lose the knife. The Mitchells and Wilsons make amends and Alice mentions she can bring Dennis to work with her because her office now has a daycare center. George and Martha insist they would be happy to watch Dennis, just as Dennis accidentally flings a flaming marshmallow onto George's forehead.

== Cast ==
- Mason Gamble as Dennis Mitchell
- Walter Matthau as George Wilson
- Joan Plowright as Martha Wilson
- Christopher Lloyd as Switchblade Sam
- Lea Thompson as Alice Mitchell
- Robert Stanton as Henry Mitchell
- Amy Sakasitz as Margaret Wade
- Kellen Hathaway as Joey McDonald
- Paul Winfield as Chief Bennett
- Natasha Lyonne as Polly
- Devin Ratray as Mickey
- Hank Johnston as Gunther Beckman
- Melinda Mullins as Andrea
- Billie Bird as Edith Butterwell
- Bill Erwin as Edward Little
- Arnold Stang as Photographer
- Ben Stein as Boss
- Jeannie Russell as Neighbor

== Production ==
Following the success of Home Alone, studios became interested in producing a feature film adaptation of Hank Ketcham's Dennis the Menace. 20th Century Fox had shown interest in the project, but potential conflicts with a Dennis the Menace stage musical that was concurrently in development saw producers pass on the deal. Additional offers were fielded from Walt Disney Pictures, as well as Steven Spielberg and Kathleen Kennedy of Amblin Entertainment. The film was taken to Warner Bros. Pictures after Ernest Chambers, Ketcham's longtime friend and the film's executive producer, was reacquainted with John Schimmel, who was an executive at the company. Warner Bros. optioned Dennis the Menace for $100,000 against $1.6 million, with an additional $250,000 to Ketcham, contingent on the film entering production.

In May 1992, it was reported that Walter Matthau would portray Mr. Wilson and filming would begin that summer. Mason Gamble won the role of Dennis Mitchell after beating a reported 20,000 children whom had auditioned. Matthau had originally planned to stay aloof from Gamble because Mr. Wilson does not like children (unlike Matthau), but this was abandoned on the first day of filming when Gamble immediately recognized him as Mr. Wilson, ran into his arms, and started showing him affection. Chambers was reportedly very satisfied with the casting and complemented the chemistry between Matthau and Gamble. According to Matthau, Christopher Lloyd's performance as Switchblade Sam was so terrifying that it frightened one of the child actors, who could not work for two days after.

Production president Terry Semel wanted Tim Burton to direct the film, but Ketcham's longtime friend and the film's executive producer Ernest Chambers rejected the idea and hired John Hughes as writer and producer, based on his work on the Home Alone films. Hughes hired Patrick Read Johnson to direct the film after seeing Spaced Invaders, but Johnson left after having "creative differences" with Hughes, and Nick Castle was hired to replace him.

== Music ==
The film's music was composed by veteran composer Jerry Goldsmith, who was John Hughes's first and only choice to write the score. The short-lived label Big Screen Records released an album of Goldsmith's score in July 1993. La-La Land Records issued the complete score in April 2014 as part of their Expanded Archival Collection on Warner Bros. titles.

Additionally, three pop hits were featured in the film: "Don't Hang Up" by The Orlons, "Whatcha Know Joe" by Jo Stafford (from the 1963 album Getting Sentimental over Tommy Dorsey) and "A String of Pearls" by Glenn Miller and His Orchestra.

== Release ==
Dennis the Menace was released theatrically on June 25, 1993. It is known as simply Dennis in the United Kingdom to avoid confusion with the unrelated British comic strip, also called Dennis the Menace, which debuted in 1951.

=== Home media ===
On October 26, 1993, four months and one day after its theatrical release, Dennis the Menace was released on VHS, Beta, 8mm and CX LaserDisc by Warner Home Video in the United States and Canada. On its release, the VHS cassette of the film came with promotional tie-ins for up to $8 in consumer mail-in rebate coupons from Crush, Nintendo through Super Nintendo Entertainment System, Game Boy and Ocean Software. The film was reissued on VHS as part of the Warner Bros. 75th Anniversary Collection in 1998, the Century Collection in 1999, the Century 2000 Collection in 2000, and the Warner Spotlight Collection in 2001. On January 28, 2003, the film was released on a "Special Edition" VHS and DVD, with bonus features, including a "making-of" featurette, the television special A Menace Named Dennis, and trailers of both the film and its direct-to-video sequel Dennis the Menace Strikes Again.

== Reception ==
=== Box office ===
The film was a success at the box office. Against a $35 million budget, it grossed $51.3 million domestically and a further $66 million overseas, for a total of $117.3 million worldwide, despite generally mixed-to-negative reviews from film critics. In Germany, it grossed more than $5 million from 800,000 admissions in its first 10 days, and was number one at the box office for three weeks.

=== Critical response ===
On Rotten Tomatoes, Dennis the Menace has an approval rating of 28%, based on 25 reviews, with an average rating of 3.9/10. The website's critical consensus reads: "Walter Matthau does a nice job as Mr. Wilson, but Dennis the Menace follows the Home Alone formula far too closely." On Metacritic, the film has a weighted average score of 49 out of 100, based on 25 critics, indicating "mixed or average" reviews. Audiences polled by CinemaScore gave the film an average grade of "A-" on a scale of A+ to F.

Vincent Canby, in what would become one of his final reviews for The New York Times, remarked that "this Dennis the Menace isn't a comic strip, but then it's not really a movie, certainly not one in the same giddy league with the two Home Alone movies", adding, "Mr. Hughes and Mr. Castle try hard to recreate a kind of timeless, idealized comic strip atmosphere, but except for the performances of Lea Thompson and Robert Stanton, who play Henry and Alice, nobody in the movie seems in touch with the nature of the comedy," and that the film "simply looks bland, unrooted in any reality". Of the other performances, Canby stated that Gamble was "a handsome boy, but [that] he displays none of the spontaneity that initially made [Macaulay] Culkin so refreshing".

A mixed review came from Peter Rainer of the Los Angeles Times, who praised Matthau's performance enormously, yet called the film "pretty tepid tomfoolery but [...] not assaultive in the way that most kids' films are nowadays":

The Dennis comic strip, early '60s TV show and currently syndicated animated series all opt for an Everytown U.S.A. blandness—pipsqueak rebellion in a '50s time warp. The movie, directed by Nick Castle from Hughes' script, is still caught up in that warp (with a few concessions, like the fact that both Henry and Alice now work). This means that Dennis doesn't get into any high-tech shenanigans. No computers, no video games, no laser guns. The film pretty much sticks to the old-fashioned basics [and] since this Dennis is only 5 years old, perhaps the decision was made to keep things slapstick-simple. Or could it be that the filmmakers regard Dennis as a "classic"—like, say, Huck Finn or Penrod?

This sort of misplaced reverence probably won't do much for young audiences accustomed to a little more zap and bounce in their heroes. Parents might be grateful, though. The shenanigans in Dennis the Menace are mostly so mildly conceived and executed that kids aren't likely to try them out on their families when they get home from the theater. Mom and Dad won't have to lock up the frying pans.

If Hughes was expecting this film to create another pipsqueak franchise for him, he may have miscalculated. Dennis the Menace seems more like a rest period in between Culkin-ized tantrums. It's not much—just one goofy little foul-up after another—but its lack of crassness is rather sweet.

Roger Ebert of the Chicago Sun-Times gave the film 2½ stars out of 4, and wrote, "There's a lot to like in Dennis the Menace. But Switchblade Sam prevents me from recommending it." Mason Gamble received a nomination for the Golden Raspberry Award for Worst New Star at the 14th Golden Raspberry Awards but won Best Youth Actor Leading Role in a Motion Picture: Comedy at the 15th Youth in Film Awards.

== Video game ==
The film spawned a platforming video game for the Amiga, Super NES and Game Boy platforms. It includes stages based on George Wilson's house, the great outdoors and a boiler room, among others.

== Sequels ==
John Hughes stated that he was interested in writing a sequel, but only on the condition of Walter Matthau returning as Mr. Wilson. In September 1992, before the first film was released, Matthau revealed that he was already signed for the sequel. In November 1996, it was reported that Dennis the Menace II was still being developed for Matthau, with the possibility of production starting after Grumpiest Old Men. In June 1997, Matthau was reportedly still involved with the sequel and voiced a desire to have his son Charles Matthau direct him in the film. However by September of that year, Don Rickles was announced as replacing Matthau in the role of Mr. Wilson, which may have spurred from the lack of confidence that Warner Bros. felt in Grumpiest Old Men following the underperformance of My Fellow Americans, a film starring Jack Lemmon and James Garner from which Matthau withdrew for health reasons. A direct-to-video standalone sequel called Dennis the Menace Strikes Again was released on July 14, 1998, with a new cast. A second sequel, A Dennis the Menace Christmas, was released on November 6, 2007, with a third cast.
