= Mason Gamble =

American marine biologist and former actor

- Born: January 16, 1986 (age 40); Chicago, Illinois, U.S.
- Occupations: Actor; marine biologist
- Years active: 1993–2011
- Known for: Dennis Mitchell in Dennis the Menace

Mason Gamble (born January 16, 1986) is an American former actor who played the eponymous comic character in the 1993 film Dennis the Menace, selected from over 20,000 children. He also appeared as Max Fischer's young accomplice, Dirk Calloway, in Wes Anderson's film Rushmore.

== Education ==
As of 2016, Gamble has a doctoral candidate in environmental science and engineering at the Institute of the Environment and Sustainability at UCLA.

== Filmography ==
=== Film ===
Year	Title	Role	Notes
1993	Dennis the Menace	Dennis Mitchell	Nominated for the Razzie Award for Worst New Star; Won the Young Artist Award for Best Youth Actor Leading Role in a Motion Picture Comedy
1996	Just in Time	Noah	
1996	Spy Hard	McCluckey	
1996	Bad Moon	Brett Harrison	
1997	Gattaca	Young Vincent Freeman	
1998	Rushmore	Dirk Calloway	Nominated for the Young Artist Award for Best Performance in a Feature Film – Supporting Young Actor; Nominated for a YoungStar Award for Best Performance by a Young Actor in a Comedy Film
1999	Arlington Road	Brady Lang	
2001	The Rising Place	Franklin Pou (age 12)	
2002	A Gentleman's Game	Timmy Price	
2004	The Trouble with Dee Dee	Christopher Rutherford	
2011	Golf in the Kingdom	Michael Murphy	

=== Television ===
Year	Title	Role	Notes
1996	Early Edition	Bryce Porter	Episode: "Gun"
1997	ER	Robert Potter	Episode: "The Long Way Around"
1999	Anya's Bell	Scott Rhymes	Television film Won the Young Artist Award for Best Performance in a TV Movie or Pilot – Leading Young Actor
2001	Kate Brasher	Elvis Brasher	6 episodes
2001	Hollywood Remembers Walter Matthau	Himself	
2005	Close to Home	Derrick Adler	Episode: "Miranda"
2006	CSI: Miami	Scott Satlin	Episode: "Rio"
