= Al Wiseman =

American comics artist

- Born: August 25, 1918
- Died: May 17, 1988 (aged 69) California
- Area: Artist
- Notable works: Dennis the Menace comic books

Alvin R. Wiseman (August 25, 1918 – May 17, 1988) was an American cartoonist who worked on both comic strips and comic books, notably his long stint on the Dennis the Menace comic books. Wiseman's clean line was an influence on several cartoonists, including Jaime Hernandez, Gilbert Hernandez, Al Gordon, and Daniel Clowes.

== Biography ==
After Wiseman worked in advertising, he became an assistant to Hank Ketcham on Dennis the Menace. Wiseman and writer Fred Toole worked on the Dennis the Menace comic book from 1953 into the 1960s.

Al's granddaughter, Aliza, claims that many of the characters from Dennis the Menace were created by Al.

He had his own feature, Punky, in the Dennis the Menace comic books.

Charley Jones Laugh Book Wiseman did covers for Charley Jones Laugh Book, contributed to George Crenshaw's Belvedere and briefly assisted on the Yogi Bear Sunday page . He also did children's books, such as We Learn to Play (1954).

A Dennis the Menace story by Wiseman and Toole was reprinted in the Art Spiegelman and Françoise Mouly collection, The Toon Treasury of Classic Children's Comics (Abrams, 2009).
