= Maxwell Perry Cotton =

American actor

- Born: May 7, 2000 (age 26); San Diego, California, U.S.
- Other names: Max Perry Cotton; Maxwell Cotton
- Occupation: Actor
- Years active: 2006–2013
- Relatives: Mason Vale Cotton (brother)

Maxwell Perry Cotton (born May 7, 2000) is an American actor who portrayed Cooper Whedon in the television series Brothers & Sisters.

== Life and career ==
Cotton was born on May 7, 2000, in San Diego, California. Cotton graduated from Notre Dame High School. His younger brother, Mason Vale Cotton, is also an actor.

Cotton began acting at the age of six. His first ever role began in 2006, on the television series Brothers and Sisters, as Cooper Whedon. That same year, he played Zeke in the television movie Welcome to the Jungle Gym.

His first film was A Dennis the Menace Christmas in which he played Dennis Mitchell.

In 2009, Cotton appeared in the movie Like Dandelion Dust. In 2010, he appeared in Radio Free Albemuth. In 2011, he appeared in Mr. Popper's Penguins as Billy Popper. In 2013, he played young Max (Max being played by Matt Damon) in Elysium. He voiced a Civil War-era teenager, Albertus McCreery, in the documentary film The Gettysburg Address.

In 2011, he starred in Mr. Popper's Penguins as Billy Popper. In 2013, he appeared in the film Gangster Squad, where he played the son of wiretap expert Keeler.
