= Blanca (magazine) =

- Publication director: Jaime Castell
- Staff writers: Armando Matías Guiu; Elsa Martín
- Categories: Women's magazine
- Circulation: 5,000 to 12,000
- Publisher: Editorial Bruguera
- First issue: 1960; 66 years ago
- Final issue Number: 1963; 63 years ago 92
- Country: Spain
- Based in: Madrid
- Language: Spanish

Cover of Blanca magazine (c. 1961), featuring the romantic story Penalty al corazón. Published by Editorial Bruguera.

Blanca was a women's magazine published in Spain by Editorial Bruguera between 1960 and 1963, reaching a total of 92 issues.

== Context and publication history ==
Blanca appeared two years after the successful Sissi and can largely be considered a replica of it. Like Sissi, it offered a variety of content, including film and music features, along with the following sections:

Year	Issues	Title	Author(s)	Type
1960	—	Cintia	Alicia Romero / Trini Tinturé	—
1960	—	Nuestro rincón	—	Reader mail column
1960	—	The Story of May Dunning	Alberto Cuevas / Purita Campos	—
1960	—	Piluca, niña moderna	Segura	Humor comic
—	—	Graphological advice column	—	—

== Bibliography ==
- Cuadrado, Jesús (2000). Atlas español de la cultura popular: De la historieta y su uso 1873–2000. Vol. 2. Madrid: Ediciones Sinsentido / Fundación Germán Sánchez Ruipérez. ISBN 84-89384-23-1.
- Delhom, José María (1989). Catálogo del tebeo en España. 1865–1980. Barcelona: Círculo del Cómic, S.A. / CESA. ISBN 8486404029.
- Guiral, Antoni (2010). 100 años de Bruguera: De El Gato Negro a Ediciones B. Barcelona: Ediciones B. ISBN 9788466638166. Legal deposit: B-24625-2010.
- Ramírez, Juan Antonio (1975). El "comic" femenino en España: Arte sub y anulación. Divulgación universitaria, Arte y literatura, no. 78. Madrid: Cuadernos para el Diálogo. ISBN 84-229-0177-3. Legal deposit: M. 8.752 – 1975.
- Regueira, Tino (2005). Guía visual de la Editorial Bruguera (1940–1988). Barcelona: Ediciones Glénat S.L. ISBN 84-8449-664-3. Legal deposit: B-2551-05.
