= Dennis the Menace (video game) =

1993 video game

- Developers: Ocean Software; Citizen Software (Game Boy)
- Publisher: Ocean Software
- Composer: Mark Cooksey (Game Boy)
- Series: Dennis the Menace
- Platforms: Amiga, Game Boy, Super NES
- Release: Amiga: EU: 1993; SNES: EU: November 25, 1993; NA: December 25, 1993; Game Boy: EU: December 12, 1993; NA: June 12, 1994
- Genre: Platform
- Mode: Single-player

Dennis the Menace (known as Dennis in Europe) is a platform game adaptation of the 1993 film of the same name which itself is based on the Dennis the Menace comic strip. It was released for the Game Boy, Super Nintendo Entertainment System, and Amiga. The object of the game is to defeat the antagonist from the film, Switchblade Sam, who managed to find Dennis' town via the local railroad connection. Stages include Mr. Wilson's house, the great outdoors, a boiler room, and eventually a boss battle with Switchblade Sam.

== Plot ==
Dennis Mitchell has to rescue his friends Joey and Margaret, along with Mr. Wilson's coin collection, from the burglar Switchblade Sam.

== Gameplay ==
Controlling Dennis Mitchell, the player has to go through four stages, collecting five large coins in each one. If the player manages to find both of Dennis's friends along with Mr. Wilson's entire coin collection, he will have won the game.

Health is represented by hearts. If Dennis is touched by an enemy, one heart will disappear, and Dennis is temporarily stunned. Once all of the hearts are gone, the player must restart the level (but retains all main coins found). Pieces of candy located throughout the levels fully restore Dennis' health when collected.

The player has 999 seconds (16.7 minutes) to complete each stage. If time runs out, there is an immediate game over, which completely eradicates all work done on a level. The clock is not reset when Dennis loses a life.

== Reception ==
Reception

Review scores
Publication	Score
Electronic Gaming Monthly	SNES: 5.6/10
GameZone	SNES: 83/100
Joypad	GB: 85/100
Com Club	AMI: 2.5/5
Excalibur	AMI: 61%
Super Gamer	SNES: 74%

Electronic Gaming Monthly gave the Super NES version a 5.6 out of 10, remarking that "the game is somewhat unappealing, with a main character that just doesn't come to life." Super Gamer gave an overall score of 74% writing: "An extremely pretty and challenging game, although gameplay is rather fiddly and slow."
