= Dennis the Menace Strikes Again =

1998 film directed by Charles T. Kanganis

- Home video release poster
- Directed by: Charles T. Kanganis
- Written by: Tim McCanlies; Jeff Schechter
- Based on: Dennis the Menace by Hank Ketcham; Characters John Hughes
- Produced by: Robert Newmyer; Jeffrey Silver
- Starring: Justin Cooper; Don Rickles; Betty White; George Kennedy; Brian Doyle-Murray; Scott "Carrot Top" Thompson; Dwier Brown; Heidi Swedberg
- Cinematography: Christopher Faloona
- Edited by: Jeffrey Reiner
- Music by: Graeme Revell
- Production company: Outlaw Productions
- Distributed by: Warner Bros.
- Release date: July 14, 1998
- Running time: 75 minutes
- Country: United States
- Language: English

Dennis the Menace Strikes Again (also known as: Dennis 2: Dennis Strikes Again) is a 1998 American comedy film. It is a standalone sequel to the 1993 theatrical feature Dennis the Menace and stars Don Rickles, Betty White, and Justin Cooper. It was produced by Outlaw Productions and released by Warner Home Video under their Family Entertainment label on July 14, 1998. The film was nominated for its sound editing at the 1999 Golden Reel awards.

While the first film primarily took inspiration from the original Dennis the Menace comic strips, Dennis the Menace Strikes Again is more slapstick-heavy and takes inspiration from the television and animated adaptations of the strip.

None of the cast from the first film returned to reprise their roles, with all of them being recast. Additionally, it was Don Rickles' final live action film performance prior to his death in 2017.

== Plot ==
Two and a half years after the first film, Dennis Mitchell is worse than ever. At the beginning of the film, he goes over to the Wilsons' house to offer George some pets as gifts for his birthday. They include frogs, lizards, snakes, insects, tarantulas, scorpions, mice, exotic mammals, and even a baby alligator. The ordeal ends with George unintentionally riding down a flight of stairs in Dennis' red wagon and accidentally getting his birthday cake thrown on his face by his wife, Martha.

Soon after the incident, Mr. Johnson, Dennis' grandfather, Alice's father, and Henry's father-in law, shows up and announces that he is moving in with them. Dennis starts spending more time with him than George.

George, upset that he's getting older, gets tricked by two crooked con men, the Professor and his assistant, who try to talk him into buying a "rare" root used to make tea to make people younger. He is about to pay them $10,000 when Dennis comes by. Dennis then reveals that he owns one of the same kind, which he says he found on a place where those abound.

Soon afterward, the Professor and Sylvester return and sell George a machine that allegedly makes people younger. Suddenly, the attitudes of him and Mr. Johnson reverse as the latter feels the former's pain of living in the same neighborhood as Dennis, while he starts to feel youthful and happy. While Dennis is trying to clean up a pile of garbage that he accidentally threw on Mr. Johnson's car while taking out the trash, he accidentally destroys George's machine with cotton candy mix that he mistook for soap. Dennis is sent to his room by his dad, then he gets spanked by his mom and ultimately grounded by his dad. As a result of it, George declares that he and Martha will be moving away from Dennis for good, whereupon Mr. Johnson decides to move into their house, although no one seems to really want to carry out the plan.

Overhearing everything, the Professor and Sylvester decide to use George's plan as an opportunity to get more money from him. Dennis helps the policemen (unintentionally) catch them (as they pretended to be several different workmen at the Wilsons' house when they were planning to move, attempting yet again to drain his bank account by stockpiling a hoard of his as yet uncashed checks by claiming that the house needed several repairs before it could be sold).

The policemen return the uncashed checks, and George decides not to move after Dennis begs him not to do so. Mr. Johnson, however, announces intentions to get his camper back, having promised to take Dennis to the Grand Canyon, also because of everything he has put him through.

The film ends as Dennis and Mr. Johnson are in his camper in the Grand Canyon and Dennis, wanting to take a rock home to George as a present, accidentally takes the one from under the camper, causing it to roll down the incline it is parked on top of with Mr. Johnson still inside. While enjoying Christmas, George and Martha find out what has happened on the news as Dennis explains to the camera and Mr. Johnson is being airlifted to safety. Dennis gives a shoutout to George, which leaves him so flabbergasted that he mutters to the viewers, "He's a menace!".

== Cast ==
- Justin Cooper as Dennis Mitchell, a young boy who is a total disaster.
- Don Rickles as George Wilson, the Mitchells' grumpy elderly next door neighbor and Martha's husband who strongly dislikes Dennis.
- Betty White as Martha Wilson, George's wife who thinks of Dennis as a surrogate grandson.
- George Kennedy as Mr. Johnson, Dennis' maternal grandfather, Alice's father, and Henry's father-in law who moves in with the Mitchells.
- Brian Doyle-Murray as the Professor, a con artist.
- Scott "Carrot Top" Thompson as Sylvester, the Professor's assistant.
- Dwier Brown as Henry Mitchell, Dennis’ father
- Heidi Swedberg as Alice Johnson Mitchell, Dennis' mother
- Keith Reece as Gunther, a friend of Dennis
- Jacqueline Steiger as Margaret Wade
- Danny Turner as Joey, Dennis' best friend
- Alexa Vega as Gina, a friend of Dennis
- Brooke Candy as the little girl on the diving board

== Production ==
John Hughes stated that he was interested in writing a sequel, but only on the condition of Walter Matthau returning as Mr. Wilson. In September 1992 before the film was even released, Matthau revealed he was already signed for the sequel. In November 1996, it was reported that Dennis the Menace II was still being developed for Matthau with the possibility of production starting after Grumpiest Old Men In September 1997, Don Rickles was announced as replacing Matthau in the role of Mr. Wilson, which may have possibly spurred from the lack of confidence Warner Bros. felt in Grumpiest Old Men following the under-performance of My Fellow Americans that saw both Jack Lemmon and Matthau abandon Warner Bros. in favor of The Odd Couple II at Paramount Pictures. Production wrapped on Dennis the Menace in October 1997.

== Release ==
The film was released direct-to-video by Warner Home Video on July 14, 1998.
