= Dennis the Menace (U.S. comics) =

American newspaper comic strip

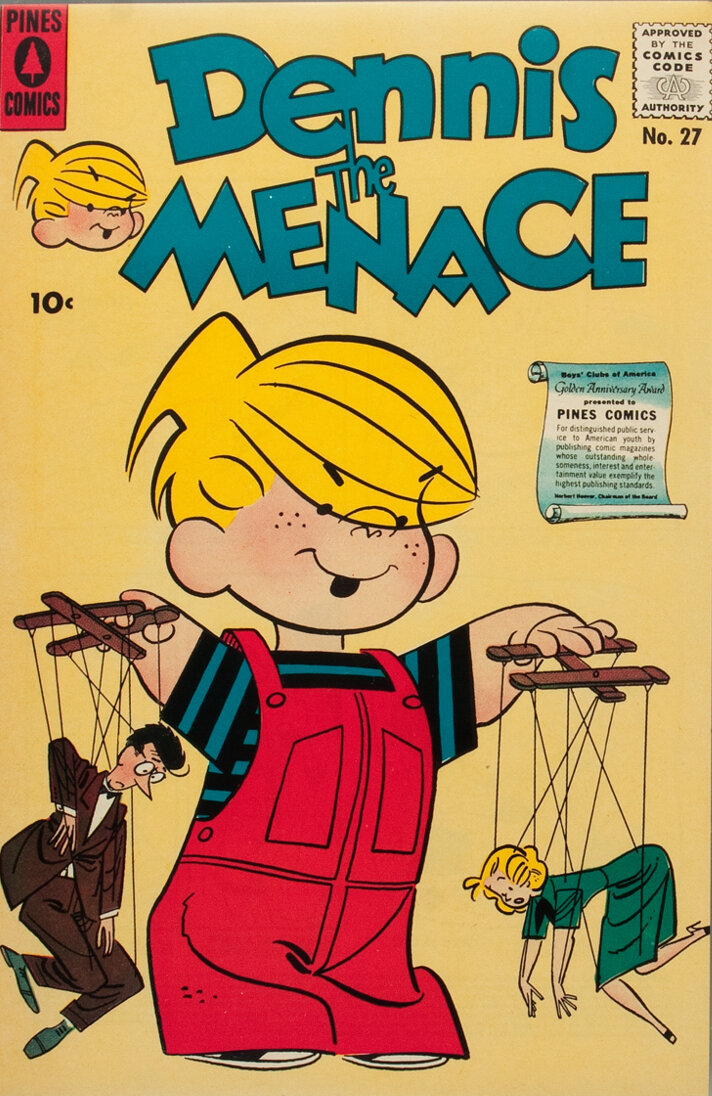
- Cover of Dennis the Menace #27 (March 1958)
- Author(s): Hank Ketcham; Marcus Hamilton; Ron Ferdinand; Scott Ketcham
- Current status/schedule: Still running
- Launch date: March 12, 1951; 75 years ago
- Syndicate: King Features Syndicate
- Publisher: Fantagraphics Books
- Genre: Gag cartoon

Dennis the Menace is a daily syndicated newspaper comic strip originally created, written, and illustrated by Hank Ketcham. The comic strip made its debut on March 12, 1951 in 16 newspapers and was originally distributed by Post-Hall Syndicate. The full-color Sunday strip debuted in January 1952. It is now written and drawn by Ketcham's former assistants, Marcus Hamilton (weekdays, since 1995), Ron Ferdinand (Sundays, since 1981), and son Scott Ketcham (since 2010), and distributed to at least 1,000 newspapers in 48 countries and in 19 languages by King Features Syndicate. The comic strip usually runs for a single panel on weekdays and a full strip on Sundays.

It has been adapted to other popular media, including several television shows, both live-action and animated, and several feature films, including theatrical and direct-to-video releases.

Coincidentally, a British comic strip of the same name debuted on the same day. The two are not related and change their names subtly in each other's countries of origin to avoid confusion.

== Characters and setting ==
Dennis the Menace is set in a middle-class suburban neighborhood in Wichita, Kansas. The Mitchell family lives in a two-story house at the fictional address of 2251 Pine Street. The Wilson family lives next door at 2253 Pine Street. The television series differs, putting the Wilsons at the also-fictional 627 Elm Street.

=== The Mitchell family ===
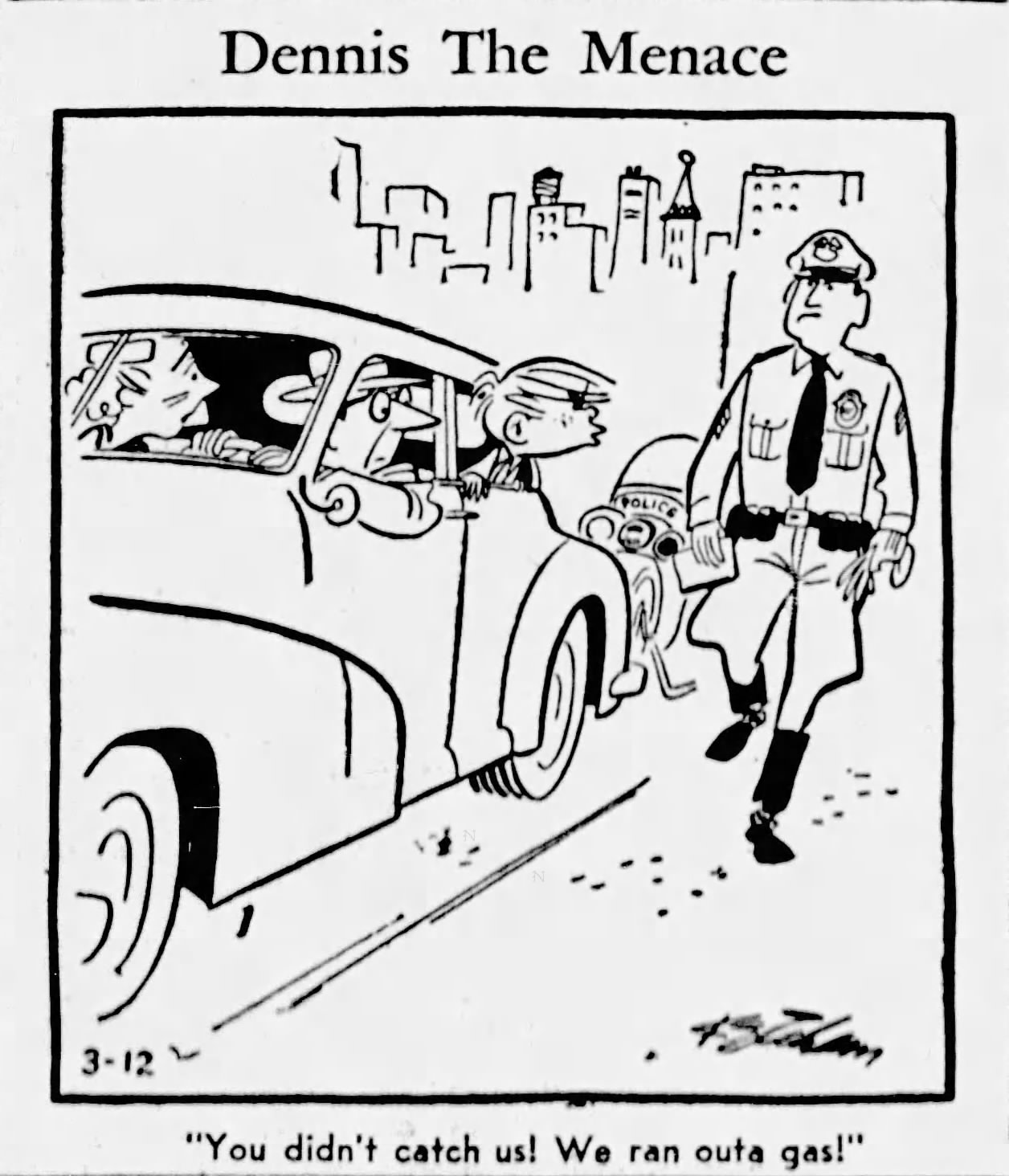
Dennis' first appearance, March 1951

- Dennis Roger Mitchell is a freckle-faced five-year-old boy with a troublesome but soft-hearted and helpful personality. His long-suffering parents, Henry and Alice Mitchell, can only shake their heads and try to explain their son's antics to others, yet they very much love and care for him. The comic efficacy of Dennis's personality lies within how his genuine attempts to help those in need, combined with his youthful energy and enthusiasm, frequently lead to trouble wherever he goes (usually at Mr. Wilson's expense). He wears a black T-shirt with blue stripes, red overalls, and white sneakers. He hates carrots and baths, loves root beer (especially with cookies or brownies), ketchup, sandwiches, water pistols, playing with other boys his age, mud puddles, camping, and Westerns (especially those starring Cowboy Bob, the comic's take on the Lone Ranger), and has occasionally been depicted wearing a cowboy costume. Dennis has a Cowboy Bob Deputy Badge, poster, and an autographed picture of Cowboy Bob, as well. Among the running gags: Dennis has a soft spot for animals such as kittens and puppies, which he is always taking home to feed; he loves loud instruments, such as horns and drums, and he ruins Christmas songs with shouts of cowboy songs or annoys adults by shouting out loud. When Dennis is in the local department store trying out toys, such as tricycles, he often ends up breaking them and making his parents buy them. Dennis nearly causes portrait photographers, hairdressers, kindergarten teachers, bus drivers, house heating equipment repairmen, the town mayor, barbers, and the local post office workers to have nervous breakdowns when he comes around. A running gag is that Dennis causes chaos wherever he visits, such as the city park, a Marineland Aquarium, the US Army, and even on vacation trips to Mexico and Hollywood. Despite all this, he is a "popular kid" with his peers, having countless friends both at his school and around the neighborhood, who are taken with his fun-loving demeanor. Dennis also believes in the Easter Bunny and Santa Claus. Another running gag is Dennis dreaming that he meets Santa Claus on Christmas Eve and causing chaos for everyone else. Another running gag involves Dennis's ever-changing parade of new babysitters; no one will take the job twice, much to Alice's annoyance.
- Henry Mitchell, age 32, is Dennis' father, an aeronautical engineer. Henry seems to understand Dennis more than his wife does, especially in affairs of the heart. Like his creator Hank Ketcham, Henry served in the United States Navy; starting position as a quartermaster (helmsman) second class on a US Navy ship, he ended up on an aircraft carrier and rose to the rank of chief petty officer. Among his hobbies are playing card games such as poker, bird watching, and playing the ukulele and singing old songs. A running gag is that Henry often plays the straight man dupe—either resulting from Dennis's "helpfulness", or because of his foolishness; once, he tried to save money on a Christmas tree by cutting one down in the country—and ended up paying $20.00 ($10.00 for a fine and $10.00 for the owner charging him for the tree).
- Alice Mitchell, née Aberdeen is Dennis' stay-at-home mother, who is usually the reassuring figure to whom Dennis can run when things get too overwhelming, ready to greet him with a warm hug. Although she grew up among animals on a chicken ranch, a running gag is that Alice is ophidiophobic (she also dislikes mice and white rats, implying she is musiphobic as well). She is the president of a local bridge club. Alice is the disciplinarian in the Mitchell household; for example, she punishes Dennis for his misbehavior by having him sit in the corner in a rocking chair for timeout.
- Ruff is Dennis's dog (a Newfoundland mix) and best friend. He is always eagerly following him around, accompanying him while Dennis is running, or riding his bike or skateboard. Another running gag is that although Ruff chases cats, he is afraid of them.
- Hot Dog is Dennis's rarely seen cat, which usually commiserates with him while he sits in the corner and reflects on his wrongdoings. Dennis gave the cat its name after the cat ate a package of hot dogs.
- Barney is another cat of the Mitchells.
- Grandparents Mr. and Mrs. Mitchell
- Grampa (Arnold "Swede" Aberdeen) is Alice's father, who spoils Dennis often. He evokes the unintentional jealousy of Mr. Wilson, for he gets to see Dennis occasionally, but Mr. Wilson sees him all the time. Because they are so much alike, Dennis and Grampa Johnson get along well. Mr. Wilson and Grampa have different perspectives on life and how to live it. While Mr. Wilson believes in acting one's age, Grampa encourages Dennis to enjoy life to the fullest. His wife's status is unknown; she is never seen in the comics, although she is mentioned four times—twice when, thanks to Dennis, Alice finds out Henry destroyed his Christmas gift (a tie) from his mother-in-law; another time a furious Alice finds out that Henry had thrown his mother-in-law's gift (a tie) into the trash. Another time, Alice wished her mother a Happy Mother's Day by telephone. Grandpa mentions his wife to Dennis, but not her status.
- Uncle Fred and Aunt Mollie
- Uncle Richard and Aunt Ginny
- Uncle John lives in Florida. The Mitchells visited him once for a vacation.
- Uncle Al lives in Texas and works in the "oil business." He runs a small oil and gas station.
- Uncle Charlie
- Uncle Ernie and Aunt Blanche
- Aunt Betty
- Aunt Hetty
- Aunt Sue

=== The Wilsons ===
- George Everett Wilson Sr. is Dennis's cranky middle-aged next-door neighbor, a retired mail carrier and (at least as far as Dennis is concerned) his best adult friend. Not much is told about his early life except he grew up on a farm, lived through The Great Depression of the 1930s, served in World War II, and is a retired postman. Dennis loves Mr. Wilson, but unintentionally annoys him, as he disrupts Mr. Wilson's attempts at a serene, quiet life; he often interrupts Mr. Wilson's hobbies such as gardening and bird watching, at times accidentally damaging his property. As a result, he displays a less than cordial attitude towards the young boy, though Dennis continues his well-meaning intrusions unabated. He is secretly fond of Dennis and misses him when he is away, although he would never openly admit it. On one occasion when the Mitchells went to Hollywood for two weeks, Mr. Wilson kept seeing Dennis' face everywhere. Mr. Wilson is named after a teacher Hank Ketcham knew. Dennis often (especially in the television series) refers to him as "Good Ol' Mr. Wilson." Although a running gag is that Dennis's pranks drive Mr. Wilson crazy, at times Dennis tries to do nice things for Mr. Wilson, such as the time Dennis left Ruff the dog and Hot Dog the cat with Mr. Wilson so he would not be lonely on Father's Day, while Dennis and his father went to a baseball game, or the time Dennis tries to cheer Mr. Wilson up on April Fool's day by placing a fake "Mitchell House for sale" sign up.
- Martha Wilson is Mr. Wilson's engaging wife who adores Dennis. Mrs. Wilson freely dotes on him and plies him with freshly baked cookies and milk. Martha sees Dennis as a surrogate grandson. By 1975, George and Martha had been married for 25 years.
- John Wilson is Mr. Wilson's brother.
- Eloise Wilson is John's wife and Mr. Wilson's sister-in-law.
- Earl Wilson is Mr. Wilson's estranged son.
- Elena Wilson is Earl's wife.
- Winnie Wilson is Mr. Wilson's granddaughter and Earl's daughter.
- Walter "Walt" Wilson is Mr. Wilson's grandson and Earl's son.
- Keith Wilson is Mr. Wilson's grandson and Earl's son.
- Sammy Wilson is Mr. Wilson's grandson and Earl's son.
- George Wilson Jr. is Mr. Wilson's son.
- Edna Wilson is George Jr.'s wife.
- Tammy Wilson is Mr. Wilson's daughter.
- George Wilson III is Mr. Wilson's grandson.
- Will Wilson is Mr. Wilson's grandson.
- Helga Wilson is Mr. Wilson's granddaughter.
- Uncle Ned is Mr. Wilson's 70-year-old uncle who visited his nephew in 1964.

=== Dennis' friends ===
- Tommy Anderson is Dennis' best friend (after Mr. Wilson). This character eventually disappeared from the strip, although he does make appearances in the Dennis the Menace Pocket Full of Fun books.
- Joey McDonald is loyal, timid, and not too bright. He is a year younger than Dennis. He usually plays the sidekick to Dennis's schemes and sees him as a big brother figure. Dennis often gives him naïve advice and gives him little "nuggets" of wisdom and insight.
- Margaret Wade is a freckled, red-haired, bespectacled know-it-all whose cloying and self-important demeanor is always getting on Dennis's nerves. She is attracted to Dennis and is stubbornly confident in the belief that she will marry him in adulthood, but he has no interest in her. She always tries to improve Dennis and his manners but succeeds only in annoying him. She has a certain amount of dislike for Gina, whom she sees as her competition. Gina gains Dennis' respect and admiration by just being herself, and Margaret's pretensions fail to impress him. Margaret, who is two years older than Dennis, is very ambitious: when she was five, she decided to join the Camp Fire Girls when she reaches the age of seven, and in one cartoon, she sells Girl Scout cookies to the Mitchells. She likes taking gymnastics and ballet, and singing Christmas carols. She is a devout religious believer, and has had pets of her own—four white Persian cats: Charlie, Prudence, Snowflake, and Mr. Coddles (whom she wheels around in a baby carriage). Whenever Margaret seeks to show him kindness, such as inviting him over to her house to help decorate a Christmas tree, be a guest at her birthday party, or when Dennis tries to have Margaret give him too much candy, Dennis' "helpfulness" results in his expulsion. Regardless of his ill-will toward Margaret, Dennis cannot resist eating at the Wades'. Margaret and Dennis are not always adversaries. Dennis once used a water pistol to spray both Margaret and Gina with his mother's perfume, prompting both to play with him and angering his mother. Margaret is a frequent victim of Dennis's practical jokes, such as being sprayed by a garden hose. On one Valentine's Day, Dennis gave "trick" Valentine's messages to Margaret, Gina, and Sally that had messages read "I DON'T Like", which earned him punishment. In one April Fool's Day comic, Dennis decided to trick Margaret with compliments instead of pranks; to his horror, she accepted the joke as real and dragged Dennis to hear her piano playing. Although she is fond of Dennis, she can lose her temper and "bop" him.
- Gina Gillotti is a fiercely independent young Italian-American girl, on whom Dennis is mostly unaware that he has a crush. Gina is tomboyish yet still feminine in appearance. She also likes Dennis in a future-sweethearts manner, but in contrast to his dislike of Margaret, Dennis enjoys Gina's company because of her independent mind and their common interests. Gina is aware of her femininity, and woe betide anyone who thinks otherwise. Just as Margaret had "flipped" Dennis in karate, Gina once "flipped" Dennis in judo. and in at least one story, her mother is depicted as being an excellent cook.
- Jackson is an African American character whom Ketcham decided to add to the cast in the late 1960s. A panel from May 13, 1970, depicted Jackson and Dennis playing in the backyard, with Dennis saying to his father, "I'm having some race trouble with Jackson. He runs FASTER than I do!" Because Jackson was illustrated as a racial caricature, the character was not received well. Protests erupted in Detroit, Little Rock, Miami, and St. Louis, and debris was thrown at the offices of the Post Dispatch. Taken aback, Ketcham issued a statement explaining that his intentions were innocent. Jackson appeared in another comic with a less exaggerated design, in which Dennis says "Me 'n Jackson are exactly the same age. Only he's different. He's left-handed." However, readers found the redesigned character "scarcely less offensive". He makes no further prominent appearances in the comics.
  - On January 22, 2024, Dennis is illustrated speaking to a black child of indeterminate identity. This child does not resemble either of Jackson's earlier designs, but like Jackson, he has no spoken dialogue.
- Jay Weldon is another African American friend of Dennis. He appeared in the 1986 animated series and was characterized as being fond of basketball. Jay was much more well-received than the character of Jackson because he was not designed as a caricature.
- Ben is a Jewish friend of Dennis. Although they celebrate different religious holidays, Ben and Dennis bond over a love of Halloween.
- Cowboy Bob is a film cowboy whom Dennis idolizes. He appears in a series of Westerns known as Cowboy Bob films. What the boy fails to realize is that Westerns are rarely made in his time and that the films he watches so enthusiastically are old repeats. In one story arc, Dennis' parents invite the retired actor to a party, and Dennis meets him and remarks that he must be Cowboy Bob's grandfather.

== History ==
=== Inspiration ===
The inspiration for the comic strip came from Dennis Ketcham, the real-life son of Hank Ketcham, who, at four years old, refused to take a nap and made a complete mess of his room. Hank tried many possible names for the character and translated them into rough pencil sketches, but when his studio door flew open, his then-wife Alice, in utter exasperation, exclaimed, "Your son is a menace!", the "Dennis the Menace" name stuck. The character of Henry Mitchell bore a striking resemblance to Ketcham, while the Mitchell family of Dennis, Henry/Hank, and Alice were all named after the Ketchams.

=== Visuals ===
Ketcham's line work has been highly praised over the years. A review on comicbookbin.com states: "...a growing legion of cartoonists, scholars, aficionados, etc. have come to appreciate the artistry of Dennis's creator, Hank Ketcham. Ketcham's beautiful artwork defines cartooning elegance. The design, the composition, and the line: it's all too, too beautiful." AV Club reviewer Noel Murray wrote: "Ketcham also experimented with his line a little early on, tightening and thickening without losing the looseness and spontaneity that remains the strip's best aspect even now."

In 2005, Dennis appeared as a guest for Blondie and Dagwood's 75th anniversary party in the comic strip Blondie.

=== Awards ===
Ketcham received the Reuben Award for the strip in 1953. He was also made honorary mayor of Wichita. He was quoted as saying, "I set the whole thing in Wichita, Kansas, and as a result I got made an honorary mayor of Wichita."

=== Ketcham retires ===
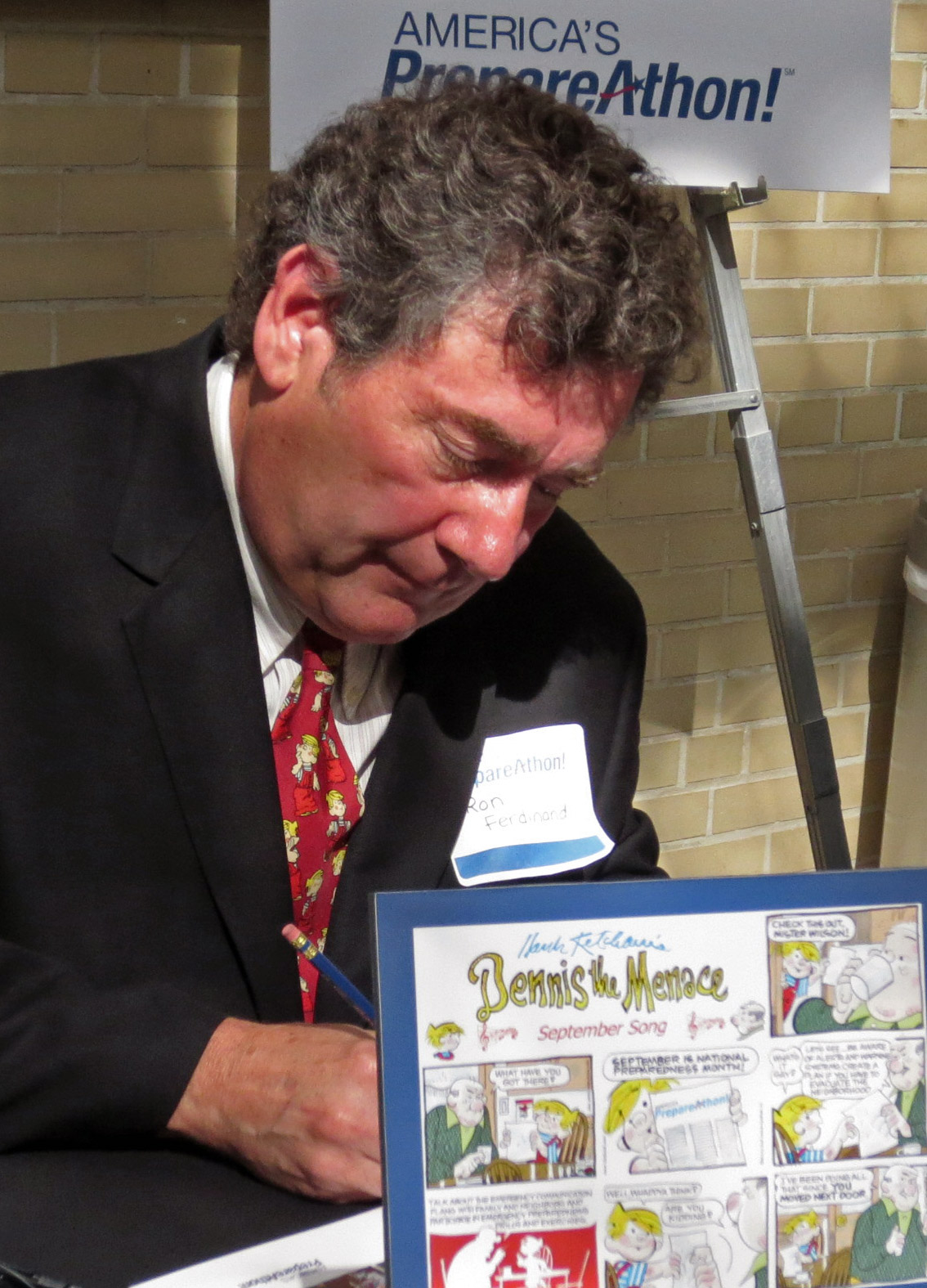
Ron Ferdinand in 2013

Hank Ketcham retired from the comic strip in 1994, turning over production of the strip to his assistants Ron Ferdinand and Marcus Hamilton. They continued their run after Ketcham's death in 2001, alongside Scott Ketcham since 2010.

== Advertising ==
Dennis the Menace appeared in A&W Restaurants advertising in the 1960s, then Dairy Queen marketing from 1971 until 2001, when he was dropped because Dairy Queen felt children could no longer relate to him. Dennis also appeared in the Sears Roebuck Wish Book Christmas catalog in the 1970s.

== Comic books ==
Dennis the Menace has been published in comic books and comic digests from the 1950s through the 1980s by a variety of publishers, including Standard/Pines (1953–58), Fawcett Comics (1958–80, during their only return to comics after settling the Captain Marvel lawsuit and selling much of their comics division to Charlton Comics), and Marvel Comics (1981–82). These included both newspaper strip reprints and original Dennis the Menace comic book stories, produced by others besides Ketcham. Al Wiseman, one of Ketcham's assistants in the 1950s and '60s, worked on many of them. Ron Ferdinand, Ketcham's Sunday page artist, drew several of the Dennis stories in the Marvel books, including the cover for issue No. 11.

=== Main series ===
The main comic book series (simply named Dennis the Menace) was initially published by Standard Comics, running for fourteen issues from August 1953 to January 1956. After his Standard Comics imprint became defunct, publisher Ned Pines continued the series at Pines Comics for another seventeen issues (15–31) from March 1956 to November 1958, after which the series moved to Hallden-Fawcett. Fawcett had previously ceased publishing comics after settling a lawsuit (National Comics Publications, Inc. v. Fawcett Publications, Inc.) over Captain Marvel with DC Comics and selling much of their comics division to Charlton Comics. The series carried the "Hallden" cover imprint for issues 32–40 (January 1959–January 1960), "Hallden-Fawcett" for issues 41–76 (March 1960–January 1965), and simply "Fawcett" for issues 77–154 (March 1965–January 1978). The series was published by CBS Consumer Publishing for the final issues 155–166 (March 1978–November 1979), with the relevant indicias listing "the Hallden Unit, CBS Consumer Publishing, a division of CBS, Inc." From issue 156 on, the covers featured a "Dennis the Menace - Fun Fest" label in the corner, which was continued onto the covers of Dennis the Menace Fun Fest #16 & 17 (January & March 1980).

=== Giant series ===
Running in tandem with the main comic book series was the Dennis the Menace Giant Series, beginning with the publication of Dennis the Menace Giant Vacation Special and Dennis the Menace Christmas Issue by Standard Comics in 1955. Those issues inaugurated the Giant series, which was published by Pines for issues 2–6, and was continued by Hallden/Fawcett for issues 6–75. The Giant series was renamed the Dennis the Menace Bonus Magazine Series beginning with issue #76 in 1970. While the indicia titled remained the same until the end of the series, under CBS Consumer Publishing, the covers began to feature "Big Bonus Series" in small text at the top left beginning with issue #174 (March 1978), and the cover title became Dennis the Menace Big Bonus Series beginning with issue #181 (August 1978), continuing until the series ended with issue #194 (October 1979). The cover title continued in 1980 with the February and April releases of Dennis the Menace Big Bonus Series #10 & 11, after which the character moved to Marvel Comics.

In 1972, the Dennis the Menace Bonus Magazine Series #103 "Short Stuff Special" featured Dennis visiting Children's Fairyland in Oakland, California.

=== Other series ===
In the Summer of 1961, Fawcett published two one-shots, first Dennis the Menace and His Dog Ruff #1 and then Dennis the Menace and His Pal Joey #1. Eight years later, Dennis the Menace and Joey #2 (July 1969) was published, followed by Dennis the Menace and Ruff #2 (September 1969), Dennis the Menace and Mr. Wilson #1 (October 1969), and Dennis the Menace and Margaret #1 (Winter 1969). These four issues continued into Dennis the Menace and His Friends Series, which began with #5 (January 1970), and which featured Margaret, Joey, Ruff, and Mr. Wilson (along with matching cover titles) in rotation four times a year until concluding with issue #46 (April 1980).

From Summer 1959 to Spring 1961, Hallden-Fawcett published five issues of The Best of Dennis the Menace, a one-hundred-page digest series collecting previously published stories from Standard, Pines, and Hallden-Fawcett. Similarly, from Spring 1969 to March 1980, fifty issues of Dennis the Menace: Pocket Full of Fun! were published by Hallden-Fawcett and (for the final three issues) CBS Consumer Publishing. It was a quarterly (January, April, July, and October) digest series collecting stories from previously published comics. Finally, just before Dennis the Menace moved to Marvel, CBS Consumer Publishing released two issues of The Very Best of Dennis the Menace (July 1979–April 1980).

=== Bible Kids series ===
In 1977, Word Books, Inc. (now HarperCollins) commissioned Hank Ketcham Enterprises, Inc. to produce a series of 10 comic books under the title Dennis and the Bible Kids, with the usual cast of characters reading (and sometimes partly acting out) the stories of Joseph, Moses, David, Esther, Jesus, and other Biblical characters. These were sold through Christian bookstores and related outlets. Each issue contained several inspirational renderings by Hank Ketcham himself.

=== Marvel series ===
After the end of the Hallden and CBS comics run in 1980, Ketcham had half of the comic book rights purchased by Stan Lee and Marvel Comics, so they were able to produce a new series of Dennis the Menace comic books. The new Marvel series ran for thirteen issues from December 1981 to November 1982. The smaller one-hundred-page Dennis the Menace comic digests published by Hallden-Fawcett were briefly resurrected in by Marvel in 1982 for a run of three issues titled The Very Best of Dennis the Menace, as well as a run of three issues simply titled Dennis the Menace Comics Digest.

=== List of comic books ===
==== Main series ====
Title	Starting year	Publisher
Dennis the Menace (#1–14)	1953	Standard
Dennis the Menace (#15–31)	1956	Pines
Dennis the Menace (#32–166)	1959	Hallden/Fawcett/CBS
Dennis the Menace (#1–13)	1981	Marvel

==== Other series ====
Title	Starting year	Publisher
The Best of Dennis the Menace (#1–5)	1959	Hallden
Dennis the Menace Pocket Full of Fun digest (#1–50)	1969	Fawcett
Dennis the Menace and the Bible Kids (#1–10)	1977	Word Books

=== Swedish production ===
A Dennis comic book had been published in Sweden since 1958, using the Fawcett material. But as the Swedish book was published more frequently it required more material. Poul Olsen of the publisher Dennis Förlag travelled to Geneva and met Hank Ketcham to obtain a license to produce original stories, sometimes with a Swedish setting. The production of Swedish stories began in 1966 and among the creators were Bob Heinz, Bertil Wilhelmsson, Voja Stepanovic, Dejan Stepanovic and possibly Olsen's daughter Kiki Olsen. In these stories, Dennis viewed the Vasa ski race, visited the island Gotland and the region of Dalarna, celebrated Walpurgis Night, observed the right-hand traffic reorganisation and even went to space in a rocket launched from the Esrange Space Center in Kiruna. After a contractual dispute in 1969, Dennis Förlag lost the rights to Dennis and launched a new character, Peo created by Kiki Olsen, which was accused of being a plagiarism of Dennis. The Dennis rights moved on to another Swedish publisher, Semic Press, which continued to hire Bob Heinz to create new Dennis stories for a few years into the 1970s before relying solely on American material until the Dennis comic ended in 1993.

== Book compilations ==
Dennis the Menace has also been published in mass market paperback collections, made up of newspaper strip reprints:

- Dennis the Menace (1952) Avon (also published in hardcover by Henry Holt & Co.)
- More Dennis the Menace (1954) Avon (also in hardcover by Holt)
- Baby Sitter's Guide by Dennis the Menace (1955, 1961) Pocket Books, Fawcett (also in hardcover by Holt)
- Wanted: Dennis the Menace (1955) Fawcett (also in hardcover by Holt)
- Dennis the Menace Rides Again (1956, 1971) PB, Fawcett (also in hardcover by Holt)
- Dennis the Menace vs. Everybody (1957) PB (also in hardcover by Holt)
- Dennis the Menace: Household Hurricane (1958, 1963) PB, Fawcett (also in hardcover by Holt)
- 150 Adventures of the Pickle (1958) Corgi Books
- In this Corner... Dennis the Menace (1959) Fawcett (also in hardcover by Holt)
- Dennis the Menace ...Teacher's Threat (1960) Fawcett (also in hardcover by Holt)
- Dennis the Menace: Voted Most Likely (1960) Fawcett
- Dennis the Menace, A.M. *Ambassador of Mischief (1961) Fawcett (also in hardcover by HRW)
- Dennis the Menace: Happy Half-Pint (1962) Fawcett (also in hardcover by Random House)
- Dennis the Menace ...Who, Me? (1963) Fawcett (also in hardcover by Random House)
- Just Dennis (1963) Corgi Books
- Dennis the Menace: Make-Believe Angel (1964) Fawcett
- Dennis the Menace ...Here Comes Trouble (1966) Fawcett
- Dennis the Menace and Poor Ol' Mr. Wilson (1967) Fawcett
- Dennis the Menace: All-American Kid (1968) Fawcett
- Dennis the Menace and His Pal Joey (1968) Fawcett
- Dennis the Menace: Short 'n' Snappy (1969) Fawcett
- Dennis the Menace: Perpetual Motion (1969) Fawcett
- Dennis the Menace: Your Friendly Neighborhood Kid (1969) Fawcett
- Dennis the Menace ...Everybody's Little Helper (1970) Fawcett
- Dennis the Menace: Non-Stop Nuisance (1970) Fawcett
- Dennis the Menace: Surprise Package (1971) Fawcett
- Dennis the Menace: Where the Action Is (1971) Fawcett
- Dennis the Menace: Dennis Power (1972) Fawcett
- Dennis the Menace: Just for Fun (1973) Fawcett
- Dennis the Menace: The Kid Next Door (1973) Fawcett
- Dennis the Menace: Busybody (1974) Fawcett
- Dennis the Menace: Little Pip-Squeak (1974) Fawcett
- Dennis the Menace: Play It Again, Dennis (1975) Fawcett
- Dennis the Menace to the Core (1975) Fawcett
- Dennis the Menace: Little Man in a Big Hurry (1976) Fawcett
- Dennis the Menace: Short Swinger (1976) Fawcett
- Dennis the Menace and His Girls (1977) Fawcett
- Dennis the Menace: "Your Mother's Calling!" (1977) Fawcett
- Dennis the Menace: Ol' Droopy Drawers (1978) Fawcett
- Someone's in the Kitchen with Dennis the Menace (1978) Fawcett
- Dennis the Menace: Driving Mother Up the Wall (1979) Fawcett
- Dennis the Menace: I Done It MY Way (1979) Fawcett
- Dennis the Menace: Short in the Saddle (1979) Fawcett
- Dennis the Menace: Ain't Misbehavin' (1980) Fawcett
- Dennis the Menace: Stayin' Alive (1980) Fawcett
- Dennis the Menace: Good Intenshuns (1981) Fawcett
- Dennis the Menace: One More Time! (1981) Fawcett
- Dennis the Menace: The Way I Look at It... (1982) Fawcett
- Dennis the Menace: Dog's Best Friend (1982) Fawcett
- Dennis the Menace: Supercharged and Ever Ready (1983) Fawcett
- Dennis the Menace: Sunrise Express (1983) Fawcett
- Dennis the Menace: Five Years at the Same Location (1987) Perigree Books

In 1990, Abbeville Press published Hank Ketcham's fully illustrated autobiography: The Merchant of Dennis (ISBN 9780896599437, hardcover). The book was reprinted by Fantagraphics in 2005 (ISBN 1560977140, trade paperback). Abbeville also published a softcover retrospective of the strip in 1991, Dennis the Menace: His First 40 Years.

=== Hank Ketcham's Complete Dennis the Menace ===
In 2005, comics publisher Fantagraphics began to reprint Ketcham's entire run on Dennis the Menace (excluding Sunday strips) in a projected 25-volume series over 11 years. No new volumes have been issued since 2009 and it is unknown when and if the series will resume. They are published in hardcover editions as well as paperback.

1. Hank Ketcham's Complete Dennis the Menace, 1951–1952 (2005) ISBN 1-56097-680-2
2. Hank Ketcham's Complete Dennis the Menace, 1953–1954 (2006) ISBN 1-56097-725-6
3. Hank Ketcham's Complete Dennis the Menace, 1955–1956 (2006) ISBN 1-56097-770-1
4. Hank Ketcham's Complete Dennis the Menace, 1957–1958 (2007) ISBN 978-1-56097-880-0
5. Hank Ketcham's Complete Dennis the Menace, 1959–1960 (2008) ISBN 978-1-56097-966-1
6. Hank Ketcham's Complete Dennis the Menace, 1961–1962 (2009) ISBN 978-1-60699-311-8

== Worldwide success ==
=== Film and television ===
Dennis the Menace has been the subject of a number of adaptations.

The first one produced is a CBS sitcom that aired from 1959 to 1963 starring Jay North as Dennis, Herbert Anderson as Henry Mitchell; Joseph Kearns as George Wilson, and subsequently Gale Gordon as his brother, John Wilson. North also appeared as Dennis on an episode of The Donna Reed Show and in the theatrical film Pepe (both 1960). In the United Kingdom, the series was titled simply Just Dennis, so as not to conflict with the Beano character of the same name.

On September 11, 1987, a Dennis the Menace live-action television film was broadcast; it was later released on video under the title Dennis the Menace: Dinosaur Hunter. Distributed by LBS Communications, it was produced by Colex Enterprises and DIC Entertainment as a pilot for a potential series.

Another live-action Dennis the Menace film, starring Walter Matthau as Mr. Wilson, Joan Plowright as Mrs. Wilson, and Mason Gamble as Dennis, was released to theaters in 1993. It was originally titled The Real Dennis the Menace before the final name was approved. This was followed with the direct-to-video Dennis the Menace Strikes Again in 1998, starring Don Rickles as Mr. Wilson, Betty White as Mrs. Wilson, and Justin Cooper as Dennis. The most recent film adaptation, A Dennis the Menace Christmas, was released to DVD on November 6, 2007. The Warner Bros. production starred Robert Wagner as Mr. Wilson, Louise Fletcher as Mrs. Wilson, and Maxwell Perry Cotton, then a six-year-old actor, as Dennis.

=== Animation ===
Dennis the Menace was adapted into an animated special, Dennis the Menace in Mayday for Mother which aired in 1981 and was produced by DePatie–Freeling Enterprises and Mirisch Films.

A daily animated syndicated series was produced by DIC Entertainment in 1986, featuring Brennan Thicke as the voice of Dennis, and Phil Hartman as George Wilson and Henry Mitchell. Both roles were recast to Maurice LaMarche in the second season.

DIC also produced The All-New Dennis the Menace for CBS Saturday Mornings in 1993 with Adam Wylie voicing Dennis, Greg Burson voicing George Wilson, and June Foray voicing Martha Wilson.

An animated film, Dennis the Menace in Cruise Control, premiered as part of Nickelodeon's Sunday Movie Toons block in 2002 and later released to DVD.

==== List of film and TV adaptations ====
Films

- Dennis the Menace: Dinosaur Hunter (1987, live-action TV film)
- Dennis the Menace (1993, live-action)
- Dennis the Menace Strikes Again (1998, live-action DTV)
- Dennis the Menace in Cruise Control (2002, animated TV film)
- A Dennis the Menace Christmas (2007, live-action DTV)

Crew/detail	Film				
Crew/detail	Dennis the Menace: Dinosaur Hunter (1987)	Dennis the Menace (1993)	Dennis the Menace Strikes Again (1998)	Dennis the Menace: Cruise Control (2002)	A Dennis the Menace Christmas (2007)
Director	Doug Rogers	Nick Castle	Charles T. Kanganis	Pat Ventura	Ron Oliver
Producer	Philip D. Fehrle	John Hughes and Richard Vane	Jeffrey Silver and Bobby Newmyer	Executive producers: Andy Heyward and Michael Maliani	Steven J. Wolfe
Writers	Bruce Kalish & David Garber and K.C. Dee	John Hughes	Tim McCanlies (screenplay); Tim McCanlies and Jeff Schechter (story)	Steve Granat and Cydne Clark	Kathleen Laccinole
Editor	Edward Salier	Alan Heim	Jeffrey Reiner	N/A	Zack Arnold
Composer	Randy Edelman	Jerry Goldsmith	Graeme Revell	Matt McGuire	Peter Allen
Cinematography	Arledge Armenaki	Thomas E. Ackerman	Christopher Faloona	N/A	C. Kim Miles
Production company	DIC Enterprises; Coca-Cola Telecommunications	Hughes Entertainment; Warner Bros. Family; Entertainment	Outlaw Productions; Warner Bros. Family; Entertainment	DIC Entertainment Corporation	DTM3 Productions; Sneak Preview Entertainment; Valkyrie Films; Warner Premiere
Distribution	Sony Pictures Television	Warner Bros.		Nickelodeon; MGM Home Entertainment	Warner Home Video
Released	11 September 1987	25 June 1993	14 July 1998	27 October 2002	13 November 2007
Duration	118 minutes	94 minutes	75 minutes	72 minutes	83 minutes

Television shows and specials

- Dennis the Menace (1959, live-action)
- Dennis the Menace in Mayday for Mother (1981, animated, TV special)
- Dennis the Menace (1986, animated)
- The All-New Dennis the Menace (1993, animated)

=== Playgrounds ===
==== Monterey, California ====
In 1952, Hank Ketcham spearheaded the construction of the Dennis the Menace Playground, designed by Arch Garner. It opened in Monterey, California on November 17, 1956. The playground featured a bronze statue of Dennis sculpted by Wah Chang. On the night of October 25, 2006, the 125 lb statue, which was estimated to be worth $30,000, was stolen from the playground. In April 2007, it was replaced by a reproduction of another Dennis statue Chang made for the Ketchams. It was donated by Willis W. and Ethel M. Clark Foundation. In 2015 the missing statue was found in a scrap yard in Florida, returned to Monterey, and installed in front of the city recreation office.

==== Midland, Texas ====
On July 11, 1959, another Dennis the Menace Park opened in Midland, Texas. It was an adventure playground modeled after the park in Monterey. The park was funded by an anonymous donor with the stipulation there would be no charge for admission. The city of Midland updated the park in 1993 and again in 2019 to include new and inclusive play equipment and a splash pad.

=== Video games ===
- Dennis the Menace (known as Dennis in Europe), a video game tie-in to the 1993 feature film, was released that same year by Ocean Software for the Super NES, Amiga and Game Boy.

=== Dennis the Menace in other languages ===
The comic strip has been translated into many foreign languages, which has helped make the strip's characters famous worldwide.

List of foreign language titles
Arabic: 'ّماهر الصغير' (Little Maher)
Brazilian Portuguese: Dennis, o Pimentinha
Catalan: Daniel el trapella
Chinese: 淘氣阿丹
Croatian: Vragolasti Denis
Danish: Jern-Henrik (means Iron-Henrik)
Dutch: Dennis de Bengel
Estonian: Nuhtlus Nimega Dennis
Finnish: Ville Vallaton
French: Denis la malice
French Canadian: Denis la petite peste
German: Dennis der Lausejunge (also known as Dennis die Nervensäge)
Greek: Ντένις ο Τρομερός (Dénis o Tromeros)
Hebrew: דני שובבני (Danny Shovevani)
Hungarian: Dennisz, a komisz
Icelandic: Denni Dæmalausi
Italian: Dennis la Minaccia
Japanese: わんぱくデニス (Wanpaku Dennis)
Korean: 개구쟁이 데니스
Norwegian: Dennis
Persian: دنیس دردسر
Polish: Dennis Rozrabiaka
Portuguese: Dennis o Pimentinha
Romanian: Denis pericol public
Russian:Дэннис непоседа
Serbian: Denis Napast
Sinhalese (Sri Lanka): Dangaya (දඟයා)
Spanish: Daniel el travieso
Slovenian: Dennis pokora
Swedish: Dennis (also called Lill-Knas, Bosse Bus or Kristian Tyrann in some publications in the 50s).
Turkish: Afacan Denis
