= Dennis the Menace (1986 TV series) =

Animated series

- Title card used from 1986
- Based on: Dennis the Menace by Hank Ketcham
- Directed by: Michael Maliani
- Voices of: Brennan Thicke; Phil Hartman; Marilyn Lightstone; Jeannie Elias; Donna Christie; Louise Vallance; Brian George
- Theme music composer: Shuki Levy; Haim Saban
- Composers: Shuki Levy; Haim Saban
- Countries of origin: United States; France; Canada (season 2) (Note: The first season was co-produced in France and the United States, while the second season was co-produced in the latter country and Canada.)
- Original language: English
- No. of seasons: 2
- No. of episodes: 76 (232 segments)

Production
- Executive producers: Jean Chalopin; Andy Heyward; Tetsuo Katayama
- Producers: Jean Chalopin; Andy Heyward; Tetsuo Katayama
- Running time: 22 minutes
- Production companies: DIC (Note: The first season was produced by DIC Audiovisuel. After the closure of its studios in France in 1987, the second season was produced by DIC Animation City.); Crawleys Animation (season 2)

Original release
- Network: Syndication (season 1); CBS (season 2)
- Release: September 22, 1986 – March 26, 1988

Related
- The All-New Dennis the Menace (1993)

Dennis the Menace is a 1986–88 animated series produced by DIC (with season 2 co-produced by Crawleys Animation), based on the comic strip of the same name by Hank Ketcham.

The series was originally aired in syndication in the United States, distributed by The Program Exchange. The second season aired on Saturday mornings on CBS. Each half-hour series consists of three six- or seven-minute episodes. The show was sponsored by General Mills, who is also credited as the show's copyright owner.

== Cast ==
Dennis and his friends as they appear in the series

- Brennan Thicke as Dennis Mitchell
- Phil Hartman and Maurice LaMarche as Henry Mitchell, George Wilson and Ruff (season 1 and 2, respectively)
- Louise Vallance as Alice Mitchell and Martha Wilson (season 1)
- Marilyn Lightstone as Alice Mitchell and Martha Wilson (season 2); and PeeBee Kappa
- Jeannie Elias as Joey McDonald, Tommy Anderson and Margaret Wade
- Donna Christie and Sharon Noble as Gina Gillotti
- Riva Spier as Jay Weldon

== Episodes ==
78 episodes were produced.

=== Season 1 (1986) ===
1. Cheer Up/Ghost Blusters/The Life You Save (September 22, 1986)
2. All the President's Menace/Jungle Bungle/Racetrack Menace (September 23, 1986)
3. Shark Treatment/The Love Rowboat/Wilson the Menace (September 24, 1986)
4. Fishing for Trouble/Future Fortune/Time Bomb (September 25, 1986)
5. So Long, Old Paint/Trembly Assembly/Private I (September 26, 1986)
6. A Visitor from Outer Space/Train That Boy/Genie Madness (September 29, 1986)
7. Spa Blahs/Whale of a Tale/Disaster on the Green (September 30, 1986)
8. Here, Kitty!/Circus Berserkus/The Monster of Mudville Flats (October 1, 1986)
9. The Price of Stardom/Space Menace/The Magic Flute (October 2, 1986)
10. Dennis' Yard Sale/The Abominable Snow Menace/It Came from the Planet Dennis (October 3, 1986)
11. Ruff's Hat Trick/Going Ape/Lemon-Aid (October 6, 1986)
12. Chitty Chitty Moon Walk/Wet 'N Wild/Dennis at the Movies (October 7, 1986)
13. The Supermarket/The Big Candied Apple/The Defective Detector (October 8, 1986)
14. Henry the Menace/Come Fly with Me/Camping Out (October 9, 1986)
15. Up Up and Away (From Here)/A Moving Experience/Dennis the Pirate (October 10, 1986)
16. A Better Mousetrap/Professor Myron Mentalapse/Canine Car Wash (October 13, 1986)
17. It's a Ruff Life/The Wizzer of Odd/Dennis Race 2000 (October 14, 1986)
18. The Big Power Trip/Tenting Tonight/A Hair Raising Tale (October 15, 1986)
19. Snowman Madness/The Invisible Kid/Home Destruction (October 16, 1986)
20. Hopping Mad/Mayan Mayhem/Ride 'Em Cowboy (October 17, 1986)
21. Strong Medicine/Gold Strike/Lights! Camera! Mud! (October 20, 1986)
22. Invasion of the Blob/Wild West Show-Down/The Hen Party (October 21, 1986)
23. Up Up and Oh Boy!/The Company Picnic/Aw Nuts! (October 22, 1986)
24. Clip-Joint Capers/Tanks for the Memory/Second Honeymoon (October 23, 1986)
25. A Couple of Coo-Coos/The Cloneheads/Nothing But the Tooth (October 24, 1986)
26. Mummy's Little Boy/Horsing Around/Dennis Plasters Pamplona (October 27, 1986)
27. Dennis Predicts/Dennis & the Kangaroo Cavalry/Meatball Mess (October 28, 1986)
28. My Fair Dennis/A Good Knight's Work/Life in the Fast Lane (October 29, 1986)
29. A Nightmare at the Opera/A Royal Pain/Having a Marbleous Time (October 30, 1986)
30. Marky the Menace/Dennis the Genius/A Step Ahead (October 31, 1986)
31. The Boss Gets Scalped/Mr. Dennistein/Lean Green Jumping Machine (November 3, 1986)
32. The Bicycle Thief/Menace of the Mine Shaft/Margaret's Birthday Party (November 4, 1986)
33. Medieval Evil/Beaver-Mania/Say Uncle (November 5, 1986)
34. Sounds in the Night/Dennis Does Hollywood/Ruff to the Rescue (November 6, 1986)
35. Laundry Business/Journey to the Center of Uncle Charlie's Farm/Dennis Springs Into Action (November 7, 1986)
36. Double Dennis/Timber Wolves/Help Not Wanted (November 10, 1986)
37. Ruff's Masterpiece/Going to the Dogs/Big Baby (November 11, 1986)
38. Building a Better Dog House/Dennis and the Dragon (aka Dennis Mitchell's Medieval/Castle Adventure)/Hic! (November 12, 1986)
39. Million Dollar Dennis/3-D and Me (aka Dennis Mitchell's Submarine's 3-D Movie Adventure)/Barber Shop Disharmony (November 13, 1986)
40. Give a Little Whistle/Charmed I'm Sure/After Hours (November 14, 1986)
41. Baseball's Best Ballplayer/Mr. Wilson's Diet/The Backyard Band (November 17, 1986)
42. So Sorry!/Shock Therapy/Yard Wars (November 18, 1986)
43. Strike Up the Band/Queen of Chinatown/Tale of a Tux (November 19, 1986)
44. Bowling for Dennis/Dennis Conquers the Navy/The Longest Half-Yard (November 20, 1986)
45. Vampire Scare/Give Me Liberty or Give Me Dennis/Wilson for Mayor (November 21, 1986)
46. Dangerous Detour/The Prodigy/The Chimp (November 24, 1986)
47. High Steel/Bicycle Mania/Little Dogs Lost (November 25, 1986)
48. Dennis Destroys Dallas/Black & Blue Hawaii/Oil's Well That Ends Well (November 26, 1986)
49. Door to Door Bore/Dennis in Venice/Young Sherlock Dennis (November 27, 1986)
50. Surf's Up/Yo Ho Ho/The Karate Kiddie (November 28, 1986)
51. Dennis and the Deep/K-9 Kollege/Housepests (December 1, 1986)
52. Animalympics/No Bones About It/Dennis Takes the Cake (December 2, 1986)
53. Quiet Riot/The Magic Pen/A Feeling for Stealing (December 3, 1986)
54. Househusband Henry/Wheeling & Double-Dealing/Stop That Car! (December 4, 1986)
55. Lights, Camera, Auction!/Boy Ahoy/Faulty Alarm (December 5, 1986)
56. Attack of the Giant Tomatoes/The Dinosaur Doozy/Funhouse Grouch (December 8, 1986)
57. Dennis the Businessman/Soccer it to Me, Dennis/Camp Over Here-Over There (December 9, 1986)
58. Hullaballoo at the Harmony Homes/Phantom of the Wax Museum/Dennis and the Gypsy Woman (December 10, 1986)
59. Hail to the Chief/Dennis in Microchipland/Handy Dandy Dennis (December 11, 1986)
60. Back to the Drawing Board/Part-Time Helper/G.I. George (December 12, 1986)
61. Dennis Rocks Out/Deserted with Dennis/Fashionable Menace (December 15, 1986)
62. Wanted: Scarface Wilson/Ruff Come Home/10-4 Dennis (December 16, 1986)
63. Heroes Unwelcome/The Martians are Coming/Ancient Olympics (December 17, 1986)
64. Pool Haul/Fool for Gold/Nothin' to Be Afraid Of (December 18, 1986)
65. Yankee Doodle Dennis/Dennis the Barnstormer/Trial and Error (December 19, 1986)

=== Season 2 (1988) ===
1. Frankenstymied/Space Race/The Incredible Shrinking Dennis
2. The Great Pie Swap/Climb of the Century/Little Beauty Shop of Horrors
3. Crummy Mummy/Swiss Family Mitchell/Pie in the Eye
4. It's Magic Time/Dennis in Wonderland/Water on the Brain
5. Tunnel Vision/Super Duper Dennis/Ice Show Show-Off
6. Snow Wars/The Moroccan Pigeon/Dennis of the Jungle
7. Young at Heart/Thor-Sicle/A Word from Our Sponsor
8. A Froggy Day/Loch Ness Mess/Box Office Smash
9. Menaced Marriage/Dennis of the Yukon/Seal of Approval
10. Instant Replay/Underwater Wonderland/Safe at Home
11. A Fox Tale/Gorilla Warfare/Shared Interest
12. Kooked Goose/Pell Mell Hotel/The Old Ball Game
13. The Wright Stuff/Hassle in the Castle/Wilson's Night Out

== Home media ==
=== VHS ===
In 1987, CBS/Fox Video (under the Playhouse Video branding) made a 75-minute VHS three-volume series, by combining the stories into direct-to-video films, and the producers created new transitional segments. The 65 episodes that were planned to be released on videocassette by Family Home Entertainment via a contract was signed in November 1985, then it was proceeded into a lawsuit by the show's producers, DIC Enterprises. In June 1993, CBS/FOX Video released seven VHS compilations in the United States:

Dennis' Great Adventure – contains the episodes All the President's Menace, The Abominable Snow Menace, Dennis in Venice and The Big Candied Apple.

Animal Antics – contains the episodes Lean, Green Jumping Machine, Shark Treatment, Jungle Bungle and Dinosaur Doozy.

Boys Will Be Boys – contains the episodes Disaster on the Green, Baseball's Best Ballplayer, Soccer it to Me, Dennis and Racetrack Menace.

Spies, Robbers and Ghosts – contains the episodes Ghost Blusters, The Monster of Mudville Flats, Young Sherlock Dennis and The Defective Detector.

Movie Exclusive - The Mitchell's Move (1987) - Dennis' father Henry gets promoted to a new job in his business, only his job is in Alaska, and Dennis and his family have to move in one week. Features the episodes The Boss Gets Scalped, The Big Candied Apple, Going to the Dogs, Vampire Scare, A Royal Pain, Trembly Assembly, and Shock Therapy.

Dennis the Menace: Memory Mayhem (1987) - features the episodes Future Fortune, A Good Knight's Work, A Moving Experience, Home Destruction, The Invisible Kid, Tanks for the Memories, and Cheer Up.

Dennis the Menace: Dennis the Movie Star (1988)

=== DVD ===
In March 2008, 20th Century Fox Home Entertainment released a select 7-episode DVD entitled Dennis the Menace: Trouble, Trouble Everywhere. This compilation includes the episodes Dennis in Venice, Mayan Mayhem, The Big Candied Apple, A Royal Pain, Dennis and the Kangaroo Cavalry, Dennis Plasters Pamplona and Black and Blue Hawaii.

Mill Creek Entertainment (under license from DHX Media) released Dennis the Menace – Volume One on DVD in March 2014. The 3-disc set contains the first 33 episodes of the series. Later in August, they released another DVD, subtitled Lights! Camera! Menace!, which contains the remaining 32 episodes from the first season.

The complete series was released in September 2016.
