= Hank Ketcham =

American cartoonist (1920–2001)

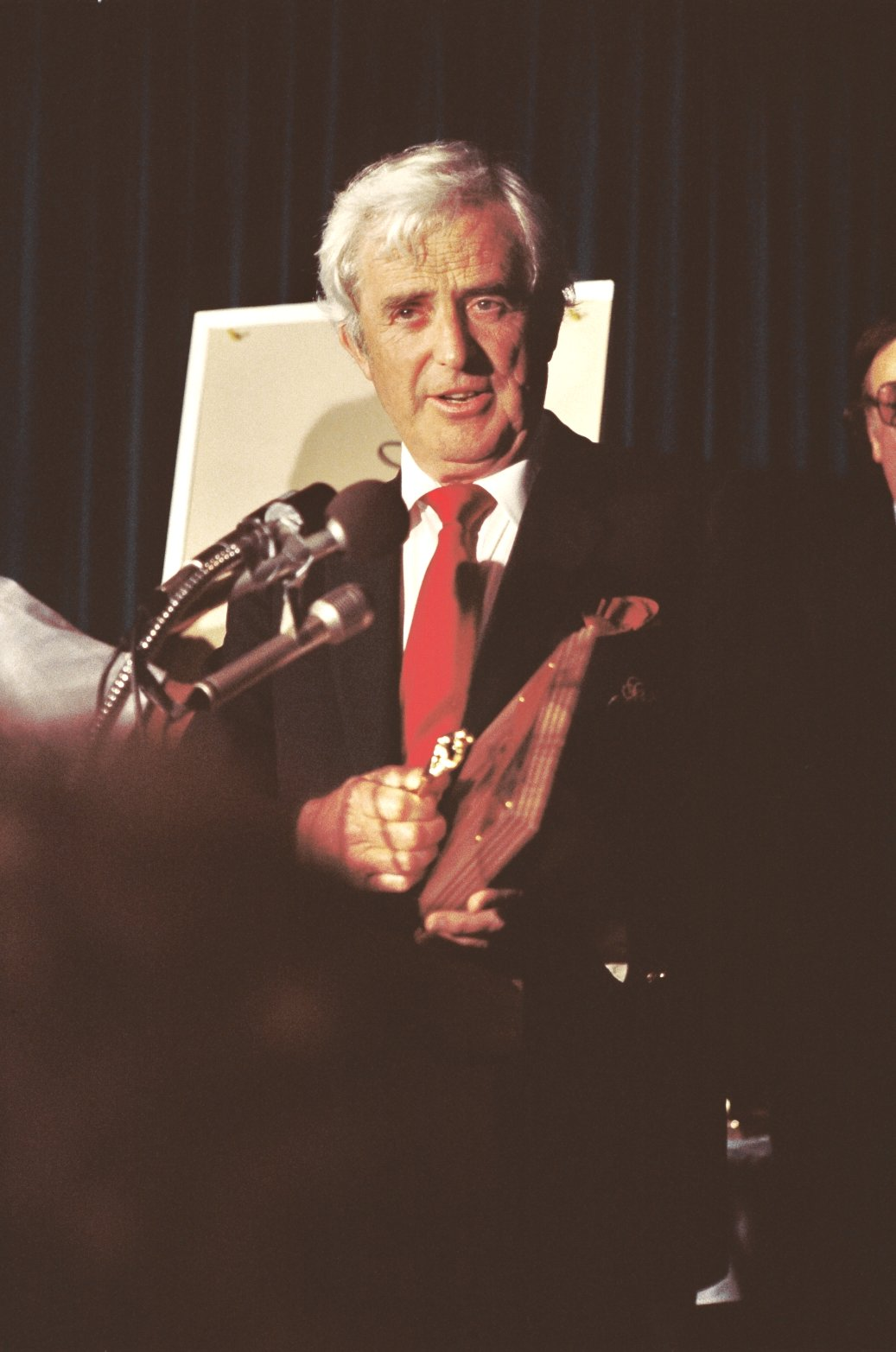
- Ketcham in 1982
- Born: Henry King Ketcham; March 14, 1920 Seattle, Washington, U.S.
- Died: June 1, 2001 (aged 81) Carmel, California, U.S.
- Areas: Artist, writer
- Notable works: Dennis the Menace
- Spouses: Alice Louise Mahar (died 1959) Jo Anne Stevens (m. 1959; div. 1968) Rolande Praepost (m. 1969)
- Children: 3

Henry King Ketcham (March 14, 1920 – June 1, 2001) was an American cartoonist who created the Dennis the Menace comic strip, writing and drawing it from 1951 to 1994, when he retired from drawing the daily cartoon and took up painting full-time in his home studio. In 1953, he received the Reuben Award for the strip, which continues today in the hands of other cartoonists.

== Early life ==
Born in Seattle, Washington, Ketcham was the son of Weaver Vinson Ketcham and the former Virginia King. When Ketcham was six years old, his father had an illustrator over for dinner. After dinner, this guest showed Ketcham his "magic pencil", and drew some illustrations. Ketcham was immediately hooked, and soon his father set up a small desk in the closet of his bedroom at which he could draw. After graduating from Queen Anne High School in 1937, he attended the University of Washington, but dropped out after his first year and hitchhiked to Los Angeles, hoping to work for Walt Disney.

== Career ==
Ketcham in 1953

Ketcham started in the business as an assistant animator for Walter Lantz and, starting in 1939, for Walt Disney, where he worked on Pinocchio, Fantasia, Bambi, and several Donald Duck shorts. During World War II, Ketcham was a photographic specialist with the U.S. Navy Reserve. He also created the character Mr. Hook for the Navy during World War II, and four cartoons were made (one by Walter Lantz Productions, in color, and three by Warner Bros. Cartoons, in black and white). Also while in the Navy, he began a camp newspaper strip, Half Hitch, which ran in The Saturday Evening Post beginning in 1943. By 1944, his freelance cartoons were running in Collier's and Liberty magazines.

After World War II, Ketcham settled in Carmel, California, and began work as a freelance cartoonist. He built a two-bedroom redwood house and studio in Carmel Woods. In 1951, he started Dennis the Menace, based on his own four-year-old son Dennis. Ketcham was in his studio in October 1950 when his first wife, Alice, burst into the studio and complained that their four-year-old, Dennis, had wrecked his bedroom instead of napping. "Your son is a menace!" she shouted. Within five months, 16 newspapers began carrying Dennis the Menace. By May 1953, 193 newspapers in the United States and 52 in other countries were carrying the strip to 30 million readers.

"The Charming Spanish residence and guest cottage overlooked sweeping lawns and gardens leading down to the swimming pool and cabana, and in the distance were the typical California soft golden hills dotted with live oak trees."

— Autobiography of Hank Ketcham

By 1955, Ketcham moved from his Carmel cottage to upper Carmel Valley, where he purchased the former 61.2 acres (24.8 ha) Fred Wolferman ranch, only 40 minutes from the Monterey Peninsula. The Spanish adobe home on the Carmel Valley property was designed by architect Hugh W. Comstock with bitudobe brick. On the edge of the orchard was a Victorian ranch house for the foreman and his family, designed by architect Wilson Mizner.

In 1958, Dennis Play Products, Inc., was created by Ketcham to distribute toys, which included the Dennis the Menace Doll, Ruff Dog, and Banshee Ball. Between 1959 and 1964 Dennis the Menace was broadcast on CBS television, based on the Ketcham comic strip. The show was a great success.

In 1970, King Features Syndicate revived Ketcham's wartime strip Half Hitch as a newspaper comic. The strip was published under Ketcham's name, although it was drawn and written by others. The new version of Half Hitch ran until 1975.

== Family ==
Ketcham self-portrait in a cartoon for the program for the 1968 Bing Crosby Pro-Am Golf Tournament

Ketcham's first wife, Alice Louise Mahar Ketcham, died on June 22, 1959. (Sources differ on attributing her death either to a drug overdose or to a brain hemorrhage while at Mt. Shasta Hospital after having felt unwell while driving..) The real-life Dennis was 12 when his mother died. Ketcham and Alice were separated at the time of her death. Three weeks later, Ketcham married Jo Anne Stevens, whom he met on a blind date. The family moved to Geneva, Switzerland, where they lived from 1960 to 1977, where Ketcham continued to produce Dennis the Menace. Dennis had difficulty with his schooling, though, so he was sent to boarding school in Connecticut, while Ketcham and his second wife remained in Switzerland. This marriage ended in divorce in 1968.

In 1977, Ketcham moved back to the United States and settled in Monterey, California, with his third wife, the former Rolande Praepost, whom he had married in 1969, and with whom he had two children, Scott and Dania. Dennis Ketcham served in Vietnam, suffered post-traumatic stress disorder, and had little contact with his father. Ketcham and his son were estranged for much of Dennis's adult life.

== Later life and retirement ==
Hank Ketcham's Half Hitch (December 19, 1971)

When his Dennis the Menace cartoon added a Sunday strip, Ketcham hired artist Al Wiseman and writer Fred Toole to produce the Sunday strips and the many Dennis the Menace comic books that were published. People from around the country sent captions to him, and he would find one that he liked and illustrate the gag.

In 1990, Ketcham published a memoir titled The Merchant of Dennis the Menace chronicling his career. He retired from drawing the daily panel in 1994, when his former assistants, Marcus Hamilton and Ron Ferdinand, took over. At the time of Ketcham's death, Dennis the Menace was distributed to more than 1,000 newspapers in 48 countries and 19 languages, by King Features Syndicate.

Ketcham spent his last years in retirement at his home in Carmel, California, painting in oil and watercolor. Many of his paintings can be seen in a hospital in nearby Monterey. He died in Carmel on June 1, 2001, at the age of 81. He was survived by his oldest son, Dennis; his third wife, Rolande; and their two children, Dania and Scott.

In 2005, Fantagraphics Books started publishing what was to be a complete Dennis by Ketcham from the start of the strip, collecting two years per volume, but the publishing ceased in 2009 with the 1961–1962 volume.

== Legacy ==
The Dennis the Menace Playground was designed by Ketcham and with the help of sculptor Arch Garner in 1954. The playground opened on November 17, 1956, with children's play areas including a 1924 locomotive steam engine, donated by the Southern Pacific Railroad. A life-sized, 3.5-foot-tall (1.1 m), 200-pound (91 kg) bronze statue of cartoon strip character Dennis the Menace was displayed at the entrance to the playground. In recent years it has been stolen twice. The statue was sculpted by Wah Ming Chang, another Disney man who resided in Carmel Valley.
