= Happening '68 =

- Also known as: Happening '69; It's Happening
- Genre: Music
- Directed by: Michael Steele; Kip Walton
- Presented by: Mark Lindsay; Paul Revere
- Country of origin: United States
- Original language: English
- No. of seasons: 2
- No. of episodes: 76

Production
- Executive producers: Dick Clark; Rosalind Ross; Gerry Rochon
- Producers: Michael Steele; Kip Walton
- Running time: 25 min
- Production companies: Dick Clark Productions; ABC

Original release
- Network: ABC
- Release: January 6, 1968 – September 20, 1969

Happening '68 is a rock-and-roll variety show produced by Dick Clark Productions, which aired on the American Broadcasting Company (ABC) network. The show followed American Bandstand on Saturday afternoons. Happening '68 premiered on January 6, 1968 and was popular enough that ABC added a weekday spin-off. It's Happening ran on Mondays through Fridays from July 15, 1968 through October 25, 1968. When 1968 ended, Happening '68 became just Happening, which was canceled in October 1969.

Happening '68 was co-hosted by Mark Lindsay and Paul Revere. Their band Paul Revere and the Raiders made frequent appearances. There were guest performers lip-synching their latest releases, band contests with celebrity judges and other bits to attract teenage audiences.

The prize for each winning band was a contract with ABC Records.

== Regulars ==
- Paul Revere (Host)
- Mark Lindsay (Host)

== Guests on "Happening '68" & "Happening '69" ==
- Don Adams
- Keith Allison (solo)
- The American Breed
- Lucie Arnaz & Desi Arnaz Jr.
- Chuck Barris
- Joey Bishop
- Beach Boys
- Beach Boys (film)
- Box Tops
- Tommy Boyce & Bobby Hart
- Phyllis Brides (Tiger Beat Magazine)
- Eric Burdon & The Animals (film)
- Carol Burnett
- Glen Campbell
- Nino Candido
- Canned Heat
- Dick Cavett
- Dick Clark
- Classics IV (film)
- Marc Copage
- The Cowsills
- Bob Crane
- Creedence Clearwater Revival
- Jackie DeShannon
- Everly Brothers
- Barbara Feldon
- Eddie Fisher
- Four King Cousins, The
- Aretha Franklin (film)
- John Fred & His Playboy Band
- Friends of Distinction
- Marvin Gaye
- Grass Roots
- Paul Hampton
- Harpers Bizarre
- Jonathan Harris
- Bobby Hatfield
- Edwin Hawkins Singers
- Goldie Hawn
- Lee Hazlewood (film)
- Jimi Hendrix (film)
- Audrey Holst (Fave Magazine)
- Etta James
- Tommy James & The Shondells
- Jim & Jean (film)
- Arte Johnson
- Sajid Khan
- Andy Kim
- Gladys Knight & the Pips
- Peter Lawford
- Gary Lewis & The Playboys
- Mark Lindsay (solo)
- Little Dion
- Guy Marks
- Dick Martin
- Bill Medley
- Ross Martin
- The Monkees (without Peter Tork)
- Greg Morris
- Ann Moses (Tiger Beat Magazine)
- Nazz
- Rick Nelson
- Leonard Nimoy
- Nitty Gritty Dirt Band
- Esther & Abi Ofarim
- Oliver
- Pat Paulsen
- People!
- Peppermint Rainbow
- Peppermint Trolley Company
- Wilson Pickett
- Paul Revere & The Raiders
- Don Rickles
- Tommy Roe
- Kenny Rogers & The First Edition
- Linda Ronstadt
- Merrilee Rush
- Bobby Rydell
- Peggy Scott & Jo Jo Benson
- The Bob Seger System
- Bobby Sherman
- Frank Sinatra Jr.
- O.C. Smith
- Tommy Smothers
- Joe South
- Spiral Starecase
- Don Steele
- Steppenwolf
- Ray Stevens
- Stone Poneys
- Sly & The Family Stone
- Strawberry Alarm Clock
- Sunshine Company
- Three Dog Night
- Frankie Valli & The Four Seasons
- Bobby Vee
- The Ventures
- Lawrence Welk
- Freddy Weller (solo)
- Mason Williams (film)
- The Who (film)
- Stevie Wonder
- Brenton Wood
- JoAnne Worley
- Efrem Zimbalist Jr.

=== Appearing as Band Contest judges ===
- 1968 U.S. Olympic Swim Team (Mike Burton, Debbie Meyer, Ken Merten)
- Keith Allison
- Stefan Arngrim
- Michael Burns
- Freddy Cannon
- Angela Cartwright
- Enzo Cerusico
- Michael Christian
- Dennis Cole
- Yvonne Craig
- Jackie DeShannon
- Dino, Desi & Billy
- Samantha Dolenz
- James Doohan
- Peter Duel
- Warren Entner
- Fabian
- Sally Field
- Kathy Garver
- Christopher George
- Don Grady
- Bridget Hanley
- Bobby Hatfield
- Michael James
- Casey Kasem
- Sajid Khan
- Walter Koenig
- Vicki Lawrence
- Gary Lewis
- Sal Mineo
- Chris Montez
- Ann Moses (from Tiger Beat magazine)
- Jay North
- Gary Owens
- Regis Philbin
- Jon Provost
- The Raiders
- Tommy Roe
- Merrilee Rush
- Lalo Schifrin
- Bobby Sherman
- Kevin Shultz
- Mark Slade
- David Soul
- Johnny Tillotson
- Peter Tork
- Brenton Wood
- Bobby Vee
- Jan Michael Vincent
- Stephen Young

== Guests on "It's Happening" ==
- Barbara Acklin
- Don Adams
- Steve Allen
- Nancy Ames
- Stefan Arngrim
- The Association
- Chuck Barris Syndicate
- Shelley Berman
- Joey Bishop
- The Blossoms
- Simmy Bow
- Tommy Boyce
- Tony Butala (of The Lettermen)
- Bobby Brooks
- James Brown
- Jerry Butler
- Cherry People
- Dick Clark
- The Collage
- The Colours
- Christopher Connelly
- Professor Irwin Corey
- Jackie DeShannon
- Phyllis Diller
- Dino, Desi & Billy
- Patti Drew
- Clint Eastwood
- Ron Eliran
- Eternity's Children
- José Feliciano
- Sally Field
- Five Americans
- The Four King Cousins
- Four Tops
- Max Frost & The Troopers
- Bobby Goldsboro
- The Grass Roots
- Roosevelt Grier
- Harpers Bizarre
- Jonathan Harris and The Robot
- Richard Harris
- Bobby Hart
- Bobby Hatfield
- Barbara Hershey
- Ann Howard
- Hubert H. Humphrey
- Iron Butterfly
- Mick Jagger
- Tommy James & The Shondells
- Jay & The Techniques
- Peter Kastner
- Kurt Kasznar
- Sajid Khan
- Gladys Knight & the Pips
- Alan Jay Lerner
- Lewis & Clarke Expedition
- Rich Little
- The Marvellos
- Lee Marvin
- The McCoys
- Bill Medley
- Corbett Monica
- Chris Montez
- Greg Morris
- Johnny Nash
- Harry Nilsson
- Kathy Orloff
- Gary Owens
- Paris Sisters
- Jerry Paris
- Regis Philbin
- The Picardy
- Harve Presnell
- Professor Morrison's Lollipop
- Dack Rambo
- Frankie Randall
- Marge Redmond
- Della Reese
- Paul Revere & The Raiders
- Don Rickles
- Jeannie C. Riley
- Linda Ronstadt
- Merrilee Rush
- Sam & Dave
- Lalo Schifrin
- Madeleine Sherwood
- Jean Shrimpton
- Bob Siller
- O.C. Smith
- Spirit
- Robert Stack
- Steppenwolf
- Ray Stevens
- Strawberry Alarm Clock
- Rip Taylor
- Johnny Tillotson
- The Turtles
- Ray Walston
- Jimmy Webb
- Joe Williams
- Mason Williams
- Roger Williams
- Al Wilson
- Stevie Wonder
- Brenton Wood
- Bobby Vee
- The Vogues
- Donna Jean Young
