= Jitendra Thakurdas Gianchandani =

Indian writer

Jitendra Gianchandani (Jeet Gian)
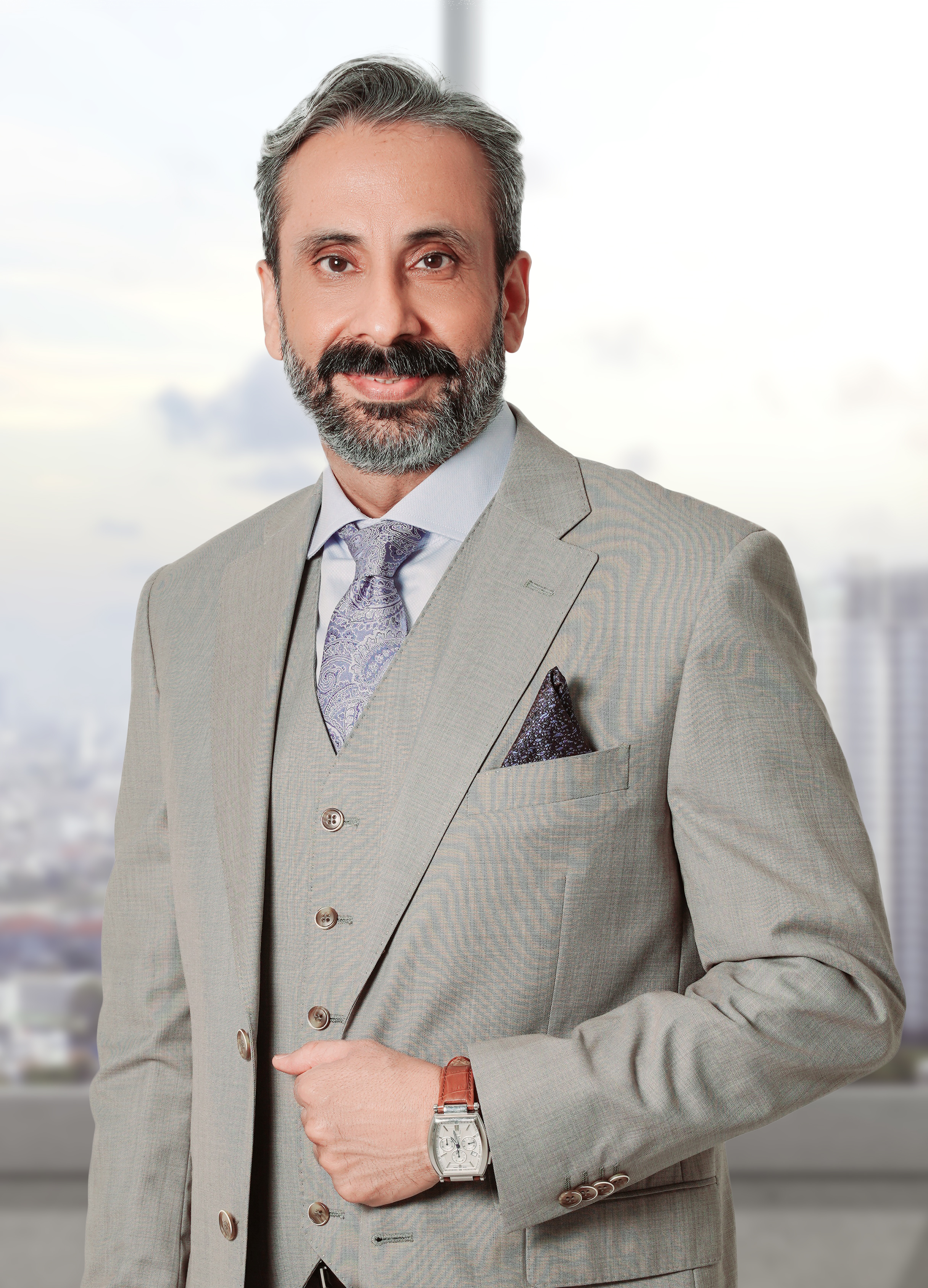
- Born: 22 May 1970 (age 56); Gujarat, India
- Occupations: Author, CEO
- Writing career
- Period: 2015–present
- Website: www.jeetgian.com

Jitendra Thakurdas Gianchandani (also known as Jeet Gian) is a Dubai-based businessman turned author. He has penned three novels titled "Father of the Bride-to-be", "The 3 U-Turns of My Life" and "The Three Wise Monkeys". "The 3 U-Turns of My Life" was on the ‘Top Ten Fiction Books' list by Financial Express. Gian is currently the chief executive officer and chairman of Jitendra Consulting Group.

== Early life and personal life ==
Born in a Sindh family, Gianchandani's father was a businessman. He has three siblings. Two of his brothers currently live in Gujarat while the third brother lives in Poland and runs a textile business. He is married and has two children.

== Literary career ==
Gianchandani began his writing career when he read Chetan Bhagat's novel ‘2 States,’ which inspired him to be a writer. His first book, ‘The 3 U-Turns of My Life’ was launched by Srishti Publishers in 2015. The book was well received. His second book, The Three Wise Monkeys, was launched in September 2016 by Leadstart Publishing and Farah Khan, Sajid Khan, and David Dhawan.

Recently in 2022, he has published his third book, "Father of the Bride-to-be".

== Professional life ==
Gianchandani is CEO, chairman, and founding partner of the Jitendra Consulting Group.

== Books ==
- Father of the Bride-to-be (2022) based on the obstacles, father and daughter face due to lying. And the lessons they learn, that shortcuts never work. Father and daughter are shocked to know the truth about the boy and his family with whom they hiding or lying with.
- The 3 U-Turns of My Life (2015) revolves around the friendship of Manav Modi and Deepak Mehra. Although they are poles apart in terms of their personalities, they love the same girl, Urvashi. The book details how their destinies collide and highlights the professional rivalry between a CA and an MBA.
- The Three Wise Monkeys (2016) provides insight into the world of secret offshore companies and black money through the story of three CA friends – Amar, Akbar, and Anthony. The author uses humor to showcase their struggles and reveal the dark underbelly of offshore companies.
