= Maya (American TV series) =

- Genre: Adventure; Drama
- Starring: Jay North; Sajid Khan; Sudesh Issar
- Theme music composer: Hans J. Salter
- Country of origin: United States
- Original language: English
- No. of seasons: 1
- No. of episodes: 18

Production
- Producer: Frank King
- Production locations: United States; India
- Running time: 60 mins
- Production companies: King Brothers Productions; MGM Television

Original release
- Network: NBC
- Release: September 16, 1967 – February 10, 1968

Related
- Maya

Maya is an American hour-long adventure television series that aired on NBC, Saturdays from 7:30 p.m. to 8:30 p.m., from September 16, 1967 until February 10, 1968. The series is a follow-up to the 1966 film of the same name, with Jay North and Sajid Khan reprising their roles. Set in the Indian jungle, the series centered on an American boy searching for his missing father, a big game hunter.

== Synopsis ==
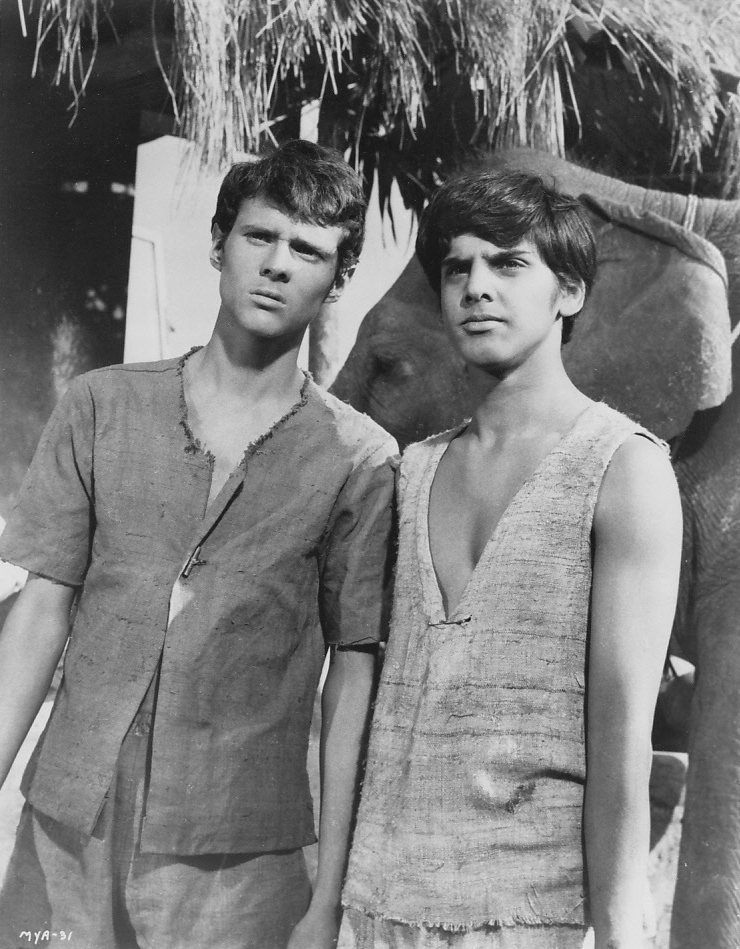
Jay North and Sajid Khan

The series starred teenage Jay North (famous for starring as Dennis the Menace as a child) as Terry Bowen, and Indian actor Sajid Khan (also prominent in his homeland from his child-acting background) as Raji, a native boy who joined up with the lead. Raji's elephant, Maya, gave the series its name. Maya was Terry and Raji's source of transportation, as well as providing help when flight or rescue was needed.

In the first episode teenage Terry Bowen arrives in India to reunite with his father, who he soon learns is missing, presumed killed by a tiger. Facing deportation back to the United States, Terry escapes the authorities, and meets up by chance with orphaned runaway Raji and his pet elephant, Maya; and the two boys decide to team up to go in search of Terry's father, as Terry is hopeful his father is actually still alive. Over the course of the series the duo and the elephant continue their search while facing many side-plots, but never succeed in their quest in the episodes made during the series' short run.

== Episodes ==
No.	Title	Directed by	Written by	Original release date
1	"Blood of the Tiger"	Marvin Chomsky	Stirling Silliphant	September 16, 1967
2	"The Allapur Conspiracy"	Hollingsworth Morse	Mort R. Lewis	September 23, 1967
3	"Tiger Boy"	Marvin Chomsky	Story by : Charles Ackerman & Edwin Blum; Teleplay by : Edwin Blum	October 7, 1967
4	"The Caper of the Golden Roe"	Marvin Chomsky	Stirling Silliphant	October 14, 1967
5	"Twilight of Empire"	Hollingsworth Morse	Richard Collins	October 21, 1967
6	"Will the Real Prince Please Get Lost?"	Marvin Chomsky	Peter Berneis	October 28, 1967
7	"The Demon of Kalamemi"	Herbert Coleman	Edwin Blum	November 4, 1967
8	"The Khandur Uprising"	Allen Baron	Story by : Rik Vollaerts; Teleplay by : Rik Vollaerts & Norman Katkov	November 18, 1967
9	"A Bus for Ramabad"	Marvin Chomsky	Howard Merrill	November 25, 1967
10	"The Root of Evil"	Allen Baron	Story by : William Copeland; Teleplay by : Paul Franklin	December 2, 1967
11	"Deadly Passage"	Hollingsworth Morse	Story by : Loren Dayle; Teleplay by : Rik Vollaerts	December 9, 1967
12	"Natira"	Herbert Coleman	Kay Lenard	December 23, 1967
13	"Mirrcan's Magic Circus"	Hollingsworth Morse	Kay Lenard	January 6, 1968
14	"The Son of Gammu Ghat"	Herbert Coleman	Rik Vollaerts & Maxwell Shane	January 13, 1968
15	"The Treasure Temple"	Herbert Coleman	Lee Erwin	January 20, 1967
16	"The Ransom of Raji"	Allen Baron	Story by : William Hersey & Richard David; Teleplay by : Richard David & Maxwell Shane & Rik Vollaerts	January 27, 1968
17	"The Witness"	Herbert Coleman	Story by : Lester Cole & Norman Katkov; Teleplay by : Maxwell Shane & Norman Katkov	February 3, 1968
18	"The Legend of Whitney Markham"	Herbert Coleman	Norman Katkov	February 10, 1968

== Production ==
Filmed entirely on location, the series was produced by Frank King, who had also produced the 1966 feature film, Maya, which inspired the series and starred Jay North, Sajid Khan, and Clint Walker as Terry's estranged father, who is never seen in the TV series. The series ended after 18 episodes due to low ratings. It featured guest appearances by several noted Indian character actors, such as Iftekhar, Prem Nath, Manmohan Krishna, Chaman Puri and I. S. Johar. Amrish Puri and Shatrughan Sinha who were newcomers at the time also made guest appearances.

Japanese singer Rajie got her stage name from the character Raji.

== DVD release ==
On August 19, 2014, Warner Bros. released the complete series on DVD in Region 1 for the very first time via their Warner Archive Collection. This is a manufacture-on-demand (MOD) release.
