= Maya (1966 film) =

1966 film by John Berry

- Directed by: John Berry
- Screenplay by: John Fante
- Story by: Gilbert Wright
- Based on: Maya (1966 novel) by Jalal Din; John Fante; Lois Roth
- Produced by: Frank King; Maurice King
- Starring: Jay North; Sajid Khan; Clint Walker
- Cinematography: Günther Senftleben
- Edited by: Richard V. Heermance
- Music by: Riz Ortolani
- Production company: King Brothers Productions
- Distributed by: Metro-Goldwyn-Mayer
- Release dates: May 26, 1966 (Germany); June 22, 1966 (United States)
- Country: United States
- Language: English

Maya is a 1966 Metrocolor/Panavision American coming-of-age story drama about a young man in the jungles of India. The film was directed by John Berry and stars Clint Walker, Jay North and Sajid Khan. Italian composer Riz Ortolani, creator of the soundtrack for Mondo Cane and Pupi Avati's films, provided the musical score.

== Plot ==
Fourteen-year-old Terry Bowen travels from the U.S. to India to meet his father Hugh Bowen for the first time. After a dispute with his father, Terry runs away and is befriended by Raji. Together, Terry and Raji have many adventures in the jungles of India. The cultural and religious differences between Terry, an American Christian, and Raji, an Indian Hindu, cause conflict. However, the boys overcome their differences and survive to deliver Maya and her sacred white calf Primo to a far away temple.

== Cast ==
- Clint Walker as Hugh Bowen
- Jay North as Terry Bowen
- Sajid Khan as Raji
- I. S. Johar as One-Eye
- P. Jairaj as Gammu Ghat
- Nana Palsikar as Raji's Father
- Uma Rao as One Eye's Daughter
- Madhusdan Pathak as Station Master
- Sonia Sahni as Sheela

== Adaptations ==
A television series based on the film aired on NBC during the 1967–1968 season for 18 episodes. Sajid Khan and Jay North reprised their roles. The series presented a retroactive continuity of the original film premise. In the series, Terry Bowen, approximately a year older than he is in the film, arrives in India to reunite with his father, who he soon learns is missing and presumed to have been killed by a tiger. Facing deportation back to the United States, Terry escapes the authorities and meets orphaned runaway Raji and his pet elephant Maya. The boys search for Terry's father, whom Terry hopes is still alive. Over the course of the series, the two boys and the elephant continue their search but never find Terry's father.

The film was adapted as a Dell comic book, also titled Maya, in December 1966.

== See also ==
- List of American films of 1966
