= Jeannie Russell =

American actress

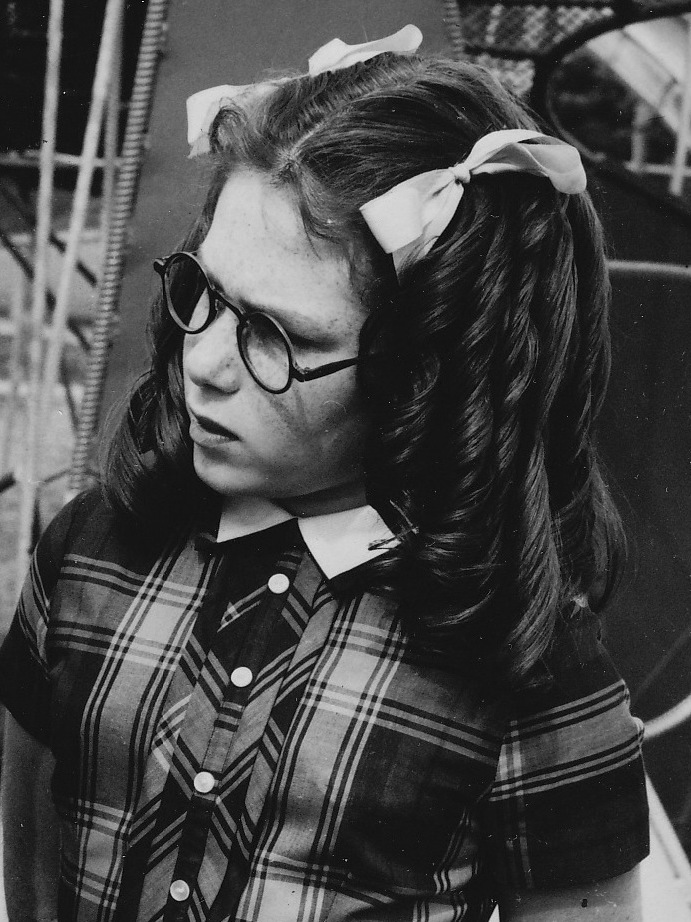
- Russell as Margaret Wade on Dennis the Menace in 1963
- Occupations: Actress, voice actress, chiropractor
- Years active: 1959–1978: 1993

Jeannie Russell is an American former actress best known for playing Dennis's playmate Margaret Wade in the television series Dennis the Menace, which was based on the Hank Ketcham comic strip of the same name and aired from 1959 to 1963 on CBS.

Russell was chosen at the suggestion of Jay North, who starred in the show's title role, to play his nemesis playmate. She appeared in 31 of the series' 146 episodes over the four-year run of the show.

== Career ==
Besides Dennis the Menace, Russell appeared in several other popular TV shows of the era, including The Deputy (1959), Assignment: Underwater (1961), Death Valley Days (1961), and The Dinah Shore Show. Russell provided a singing voice in the 1961 Disney movie Babes in Toyland and made an uncredited appearance in Alfred Hitchcock's 1963 popular suspense horror film The Birds, in which she played a schoolchild. She later appeared with Mel Winkler in Unique New York.

She has done live theater and soundtrack work, as well as performing as a singer. In the 1990s, Russell was active on the national talk-show and news-feature circuit. In 1993, she made a cameo appearance in the film version of Dennis the Menace playing one of the Mitchells' neighbors.

== Filmography ==
=== Film ===
- Babes in Toyland (1961)
- The Birds (1963)
- Dennis the Menace (1993)

=== Television ===
- The Deputy
- Assignment: Underwater
- Death Valley Days
- Dennis the Menace (1959–1963)

== External sources ==
- Jeannie Russell at IMDb
- "Tinseltown Talks: Dennis the Menace’s ‘pain in the neck’ now cures them," by Nick Thomas For The Daily Item, Aug 27, 2015
- "After cracking Hollywood as a child, Russell moved on, " by Nick ThomasTinseltown Talks, The Spectrum, Oct. 31, 2016
