= Sajid Khan =

Indian actor and singer (1951–2023)

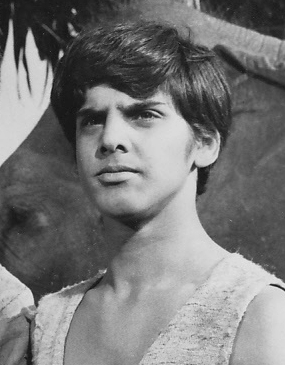
- Sajid Khan in television series "Maya" (1967)
- Born: 28 December 1951; Bombay, Maharashtra, India
- Died: 22 December 2023 (aged 71)
- Other name: Sajid Mehboob
- Years active: 1957–2001

Sajid Khan (28 December 1951 – 22 December 2023) was an Indian actor and singer. Born into poverty in the Bombay slums, he became the adopted son of Bollywood filmmaker Mehboob Khan, founder of Mehboob Studios. He worked in a handful of Indian films, debuting in his father's Academy Award-nominated Mother India (1957) and its sequel Son of India (1962). He later found more success overseas, working in international productions, including films and television shows in North America, such as Maya (1966) and its television adaptation, as well as the Philippines and United Kingdom. He was a teen idol in North America and the Philippines from the late 1960s to early 1970s.

== Early life and debut ==
Sajid was a poor child from the slums of Bombay (now Mumbai), in India's then Bombay State (now Maharashtra), before he was discovered by Bollywood filmmaker Mehboob Khan. Sajid started acting as a child appearing as the younger version of Sunil Dutt's character Birju in Mehboob Khan's Academy Award-nominated Hindi film Mother India (1957). Sajid was unknown at the time. His salary in the film was ₹750 (equivalent to ₹75,000 or US$780 in 2023). He was later adopted by Mehboob Khan and his wife Sardar Akhtar, who named him Sajid Khan.

== Career ==
After his debut in Mother India in 1957, he played the title role in his adopted father's next and last film Son of India in 1962. According to Rauf Ahmed, though the film was not a success at the box-office, Sajid's performance was praised by the critics. After his father's death in 1964, Sajid moved to the United States where he did his further education.

Khan went on to achieve fame in the United States with a co-starring role alongside Jay North in the 1966 film Maya. The film's success led to a television series of the same name airing on NBC from September 1967 to February 1968 and lasting 18 episodes. The show led to Sajid becoming a "teen idol" for a short time, appearing on the cover of popular magazines. He also had a short-lived singing career, releasing a self titled album.

In 1968, he guest-starred in an episode of the television series The Big Valley, and appeared in the music variety show It's Happening as a guest judge.

Khan also found success in the Philippines in the early 1970s, starring as the male lead in a number of romantic comedy films opposite leading Philippine actresses Nora Aunor and Vilma Santos. He tried to get back into Hindi films, but none of his Hindi films from 1972 to 1983 worked financially. His career's peak period was in 1966–1974 and he was more successful in English films. His last film appearance was in the Merchant Ivory film Heat and Dust in 1983, where he played the role of "dacoit chief," seen fleetingly in only one scene with no spoken dialogue whatsoever.

== Personal life ==
Khan was married to a woman whose name is unknown. They had two sons, Stephanos, who lives in the UK, and Sameer. Khan and his wife divorced in 1990.

By the early 1970s, Khan's career was more or less over. It is reported that, around this time, Khan opened a retail store with a small workshop in the back which made costume jewellery. 'Artistic' was the name of the retail store, located in India.

Khan died on 22 December 2023, at the age of 71 after suffering a long battle with cancer.

== Filmography ==
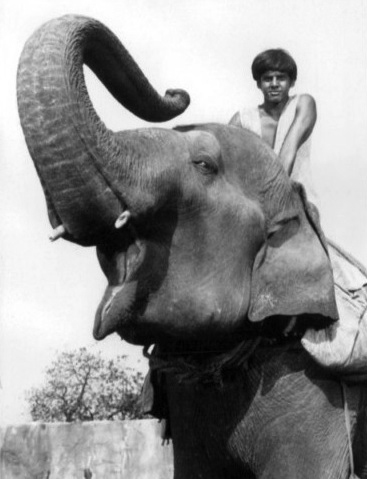
Khan as "Raji" in Maya, circa 1967.

=== Films ===
- Mother India (1957) .... Young Birju (child artist)
- Son of India (1962)
- Maya (1966) ... Raji
- The Prince and I (1971-Philippines) from Tower Productions, leading lady: Maritess Revilla
- My Funny Girl (1971-Philippines) from Tower Productions, leading lady: Tina Revilla
- The Singing Filipina (1971-Philippines) from Tower Productions, leading lady: Nora Aunor
- Savera (1972)
- Do Number Ke Ameer (1974 film)
- Mahatma and the Mad Boy (1974) Short drama (27 min) directed by Ismail Merchant boxed as Merchant Ivory in India with Heat and Dust etc.: The Mad Boy
- Zindagi Aur Toofan (1975)
- Jai Mata Di (1977) Punjabi Movie
- Mandir Masjid (1977)
- Daku Aur Jawan (1978)
- Dahshat (1981)
- Heat and Dust (1983)

=== Television ===
- Maya (1967–1968, 18 episodes) .... Raji
- It's Happening – (1968, 2 episodes) .... Himself
- The Big Valley – (1969, 1 episode, "The Royal Road") .... Prince Ranjit Singh / Jahan
- 1857 Kranti (TV series) (2000)

== Discography ==
=== Singles ===
Title	Year	Peak chart positions	Album
Title	Year	US Bub.(Billboard)	Album
"Getting to Know You" (Colgems 1026) (b/w "Ha Ram (Of Love And Peace)")	1968	8	Sajid (1969)
"Dream" (Colgems 1034) (b/w "Someday")	1969	19	Sajid (1969)

=== Albums ===
==== Sajid (1969) (Colgems COS-114) ====
1. A Song Inside (2:29)
2. Everything is You (2:29)
3. Moon River (3:15)
4. I Love How You Love Me (2:45)
5. This Guy's in Love With You (3:25)
6. Dream (2:50)
7. Smile (2:46)
8. A Closed Heart Gathers No Love (2:43)
9. Someday (2:43)
10. Ha Ram (Of Love And Peace) (2:55)
11. Getting to Know You (2:54)
