= Jay North =

American actor (1951–2025)

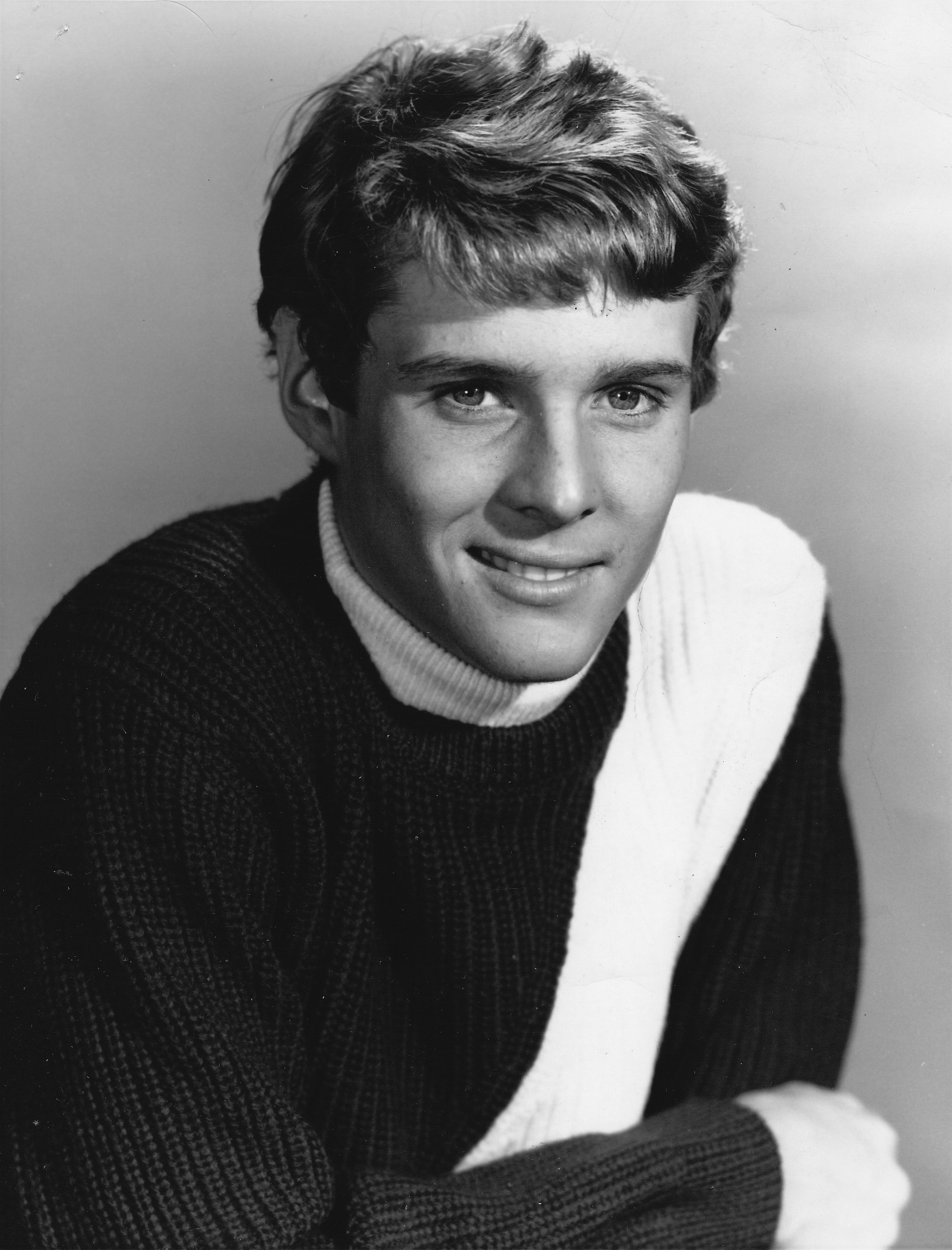
- North in Maya, 1967
- Born: Jay Waverly North Jr. August 3, 1951; Los Angeles, California, U.S.
- Died: April 6, 2025 (aged 73); Lake Butler, Florida, U.S.
- Occupations: Actor; correctional officer
- Years active: 1958–2011
- Spouses: Kathleen Brucher (m. 1973; div. 1974); Rositia (m. 1991; sep. 1991); Cindy Hackney (m. 1993)
- Relatives: Hal Hopper (uncle)

Jay Waverly North Jr. (August 3, 1951 – April 6, 2025) was an American actor and later a corrections officer after retiring from acting. His career as a child actor began in the late 1950s, and he went on to appear in eight TV series, two variety shows, and three feature films. At age seven, he became a household name for his role as the good-natured but mischievous Dennis Mitchell on the CBS situation comedy Dennis the Menace (1959–1963), based on the comic strip created by Hank Ketcham.

As a teen, North had roles in two Metro-Goldwyn-Mayer feature films: Zebra in the Kitchen and Maya. He also starred in the NBC television series adaptation of the latter film. As an adult, he turned to voice acting for animated television series, voicing the roles of Prince Turhan in the Arabian Knights segment of The Banana Splits Adventure Hour and a teenaged Bamm-Bamm Rubble on The Pebbles and Bamm-Bamm Show.

After leaving show business, North began working with fellow former child star Paul Petersen and the organization A Minor Consideration, using his experiences as a child performer to counsel other children working in the entertainment industry.

== Early life ==
North was born in Hollywood, the only child of Jay and Dorothy (née Cotton) North. North's father was an alcoholic, and his parents' marriage was turbulent. When he was four, his parents separated, and North never saw his father again. He briefly resided in Birmingham, Alabama. His mother worked as the secretary to the West Coast director of the American Federation of Television and Radio Artists. | From a young age, North was a fan of television. When he was six, his mother used her connections at AFTRA to arrange for him to appear on his favorite television program, local Los Angeles children's show Cartoon Express, hosted by Engineer Bill. Prominent Hollywood talent agent Hazel MacMillan was impressed with the photogenic boy, contacting his mother the following day offering to represent him. His mother was aware of the stories of troubled former child stars, and had reservations, but eventually gave her approval.

== Career ==
=== Early years ===
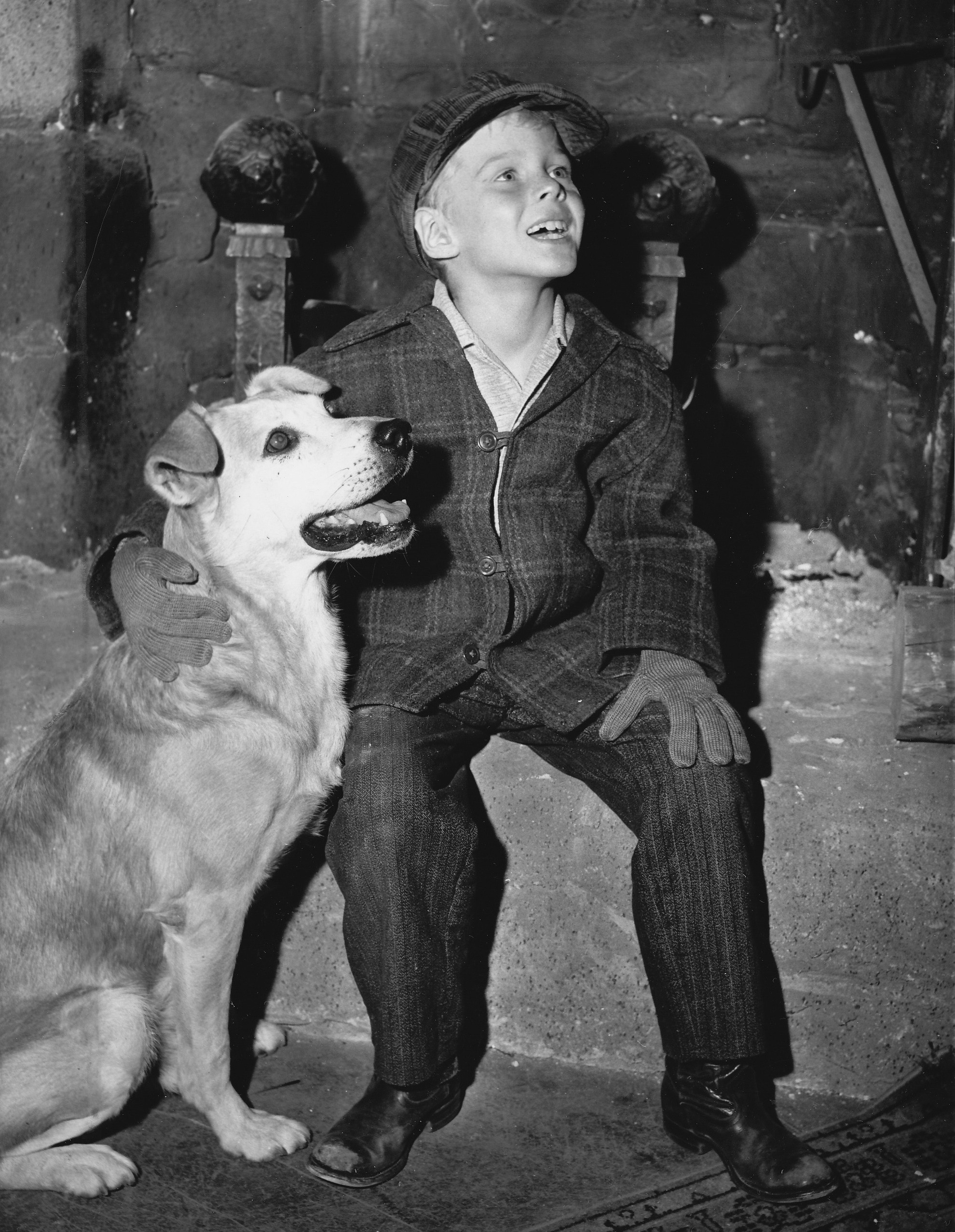
North as Laddie on the Wanted: Dead or Alive episode "Eight Cent Reward", 1958

North's first professional acting job was a live appearance on the gameshow Queen for a Day, hosted by Jack Bailey. He continued to work as a child model and actor in commercials, and landed small parts on a number of popular NBC variety shows of the 1950s, such as The George Gobel Show, The Eddie Fisher Show, and The Milton Berle Show, before auditioning for the role that made him a star.

In June 1958, Columbia Pictures's television division Screen Gems was holding a nationwide search for a boy to play the title character in their television adaptation of the popular Dennis the Menace comic strip by Hank Ketcham, and six-year-old North auditioned. After receiving news that his first audition had not gone well, agent Hazel MacMillan pressed the studio to see him again. The studio agreed and was impressed with his second audition. After hundreds of other boys' auditions, North was asked back to screen test with Herbert Anderson, Gloria Henry, and Joseph Kearns. A pilot was filmed later that summer.

The season passed, and North heard nothing more from Screen Gems, but continued to work, appearing in a Christmas-themed episode of the CBS Western series Wanted Dead or Alive titled "Eight Cent Reward". In the episode, he portrayed Laddie Stone, a young boy who pays bounty hunter Josh Randall (Steve McQueen) eight cents to find Santa Claus. Over the next several months, North made television appearances on such shows as 77 Sunset Strip, Rescue 8, Cheyenne, Bronco, Colt .45, and Sugarfoot, and broke into feature films with roles in The Miracle of the Hills and The Big Operator. In early 1959, North was confirmed to play Dennis.

=== Dennis the Menace ===
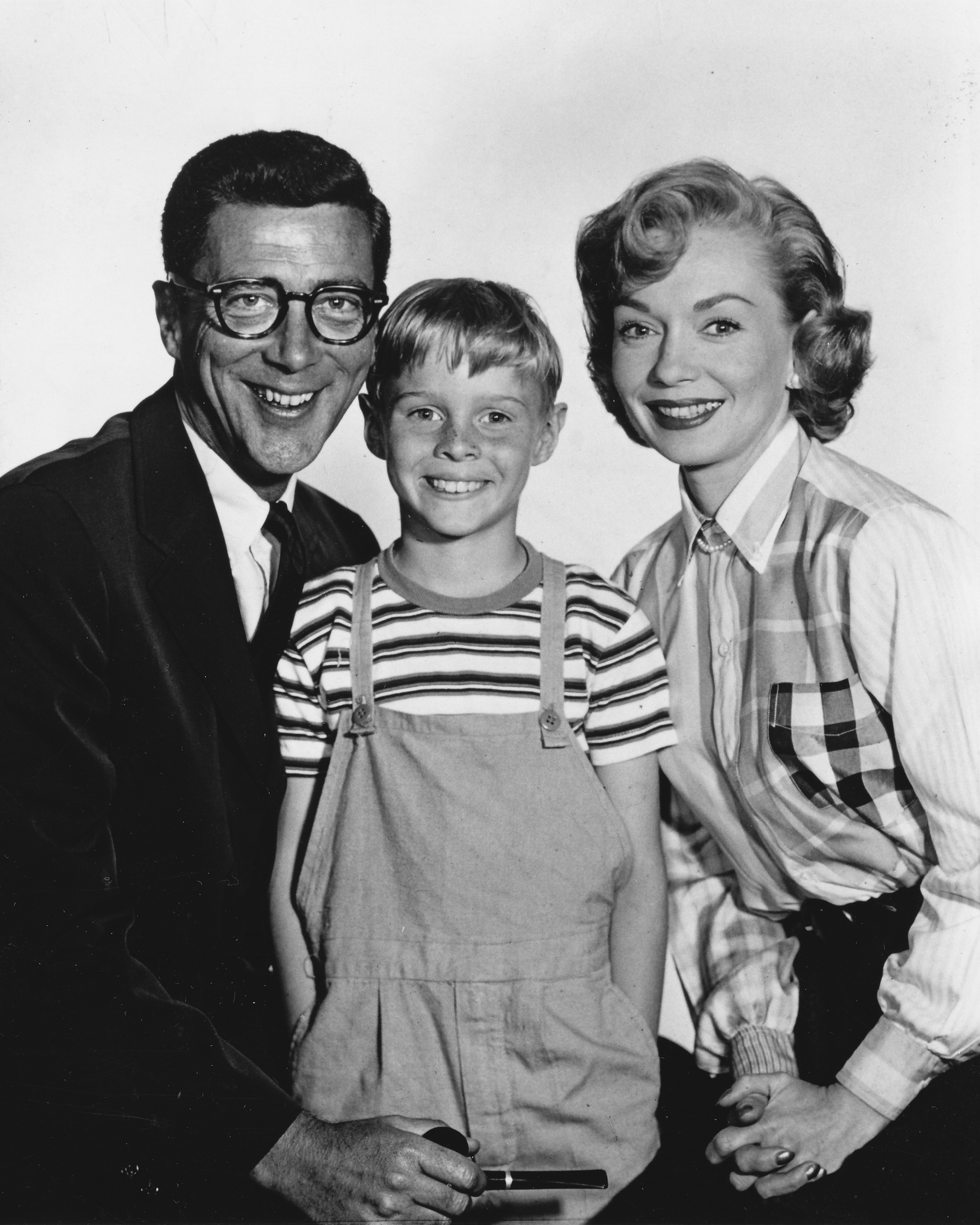
North with Dennis the Menace co-stars Herbert Anderson and Gloria Henry, 1959

Dennis the Menace premiered on CBS on Sunday, October 4, 1959, and quickly became a hit with audiences. North was paid US$500 (equivalent to about $5,500 in 2025) per episode, his strawberry red hair was bleached platinum blonde for the role, and the 8-year-old was instructed to "shave" a year off his age when speaking with the press. His mother continued to work at AFTRA full-time, and hired business managers to invest his earnings. In a 1993 interview with Filmfax magazine, North spoke highly of his mother, saying: "I want to make it very clear about one thing. I never supported my mother during [Dennis the Menace]. She earned her own money from AFTRA. She never lived off my earnings. I know that sometimes happens with child actors, but it was not true in my situation."

While his mother worked, her sister Marie Hopper and brother-in-law actor-composer Hal Hopper served as his on-set guardians during filming for Dennis the Menace. In addition to filming the series, he appeared as Dennis in commercials for the show's sponsors, Kellogg's cereals, Best Foods mayonnaise, Skippy peanut butter, and Bosco chocolate milk, and regularly traveled around the country with his aunt and uncle on the weekends to promote the show. These obligations, combined with the required three hours a day of school, took their toll on him, and by the end of the first season, the eight-year-old had begun to feel the pressures of being the lead star of a popular show.

In late 1960, the second season of the series was ranked among TV's top-20 shows, and his portrayal of Dennis had become a beloved pop culture icon. He made crossover guest appearances as Dennis on such television shows as The Donna Reed Show and The Red Skelton Hour, and in the feature film Pépé. That year, North recorded The Misadventures of Dennis the Menace soundtrack stories on LP, and an LP album of songs titled Jay North – Look who's singing!. With the success of the series, the Hoppers became strict taskmasters and stern disciplinarians. He was not allowed to socialize with other cast members on the set and missed being around children his own age. He ate alone in his dressing room. His only opportunity to relax was the occasional "free day" when he could play baseball with other children or when his uncle would take him to see horror films. His favorite films at that time were The Pit and the Pendulum and Village of the Damned.

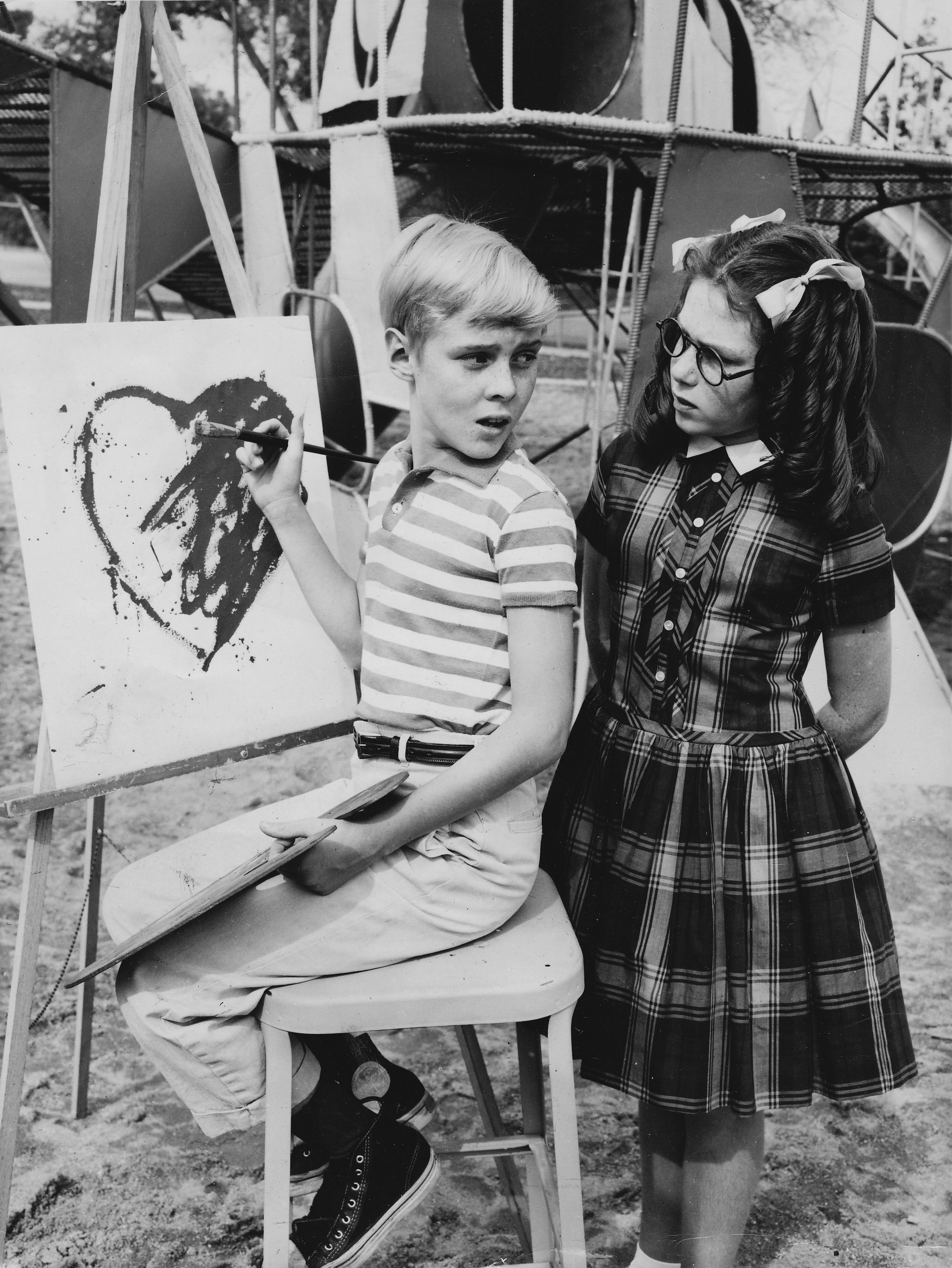
North with Jeannie Russell, 1963

By late 1961, the series was in its third season, and North was earning $2,500 (equivalent to about $27,000 in 2025) per episode. The show remained in the top 20, but North had grown tired and frustrated with the pressures of carrying a hit show and the long work hours. Complicating matters was his relationship with his aunt Marie. Many years later, North revealed that his aunt physically and verbally abused him when he made mistakes on the set or did not perform to her standards. He said if he failed a line, she would take him behind the set and beat him. For years, watching reruns was too painful for him. His mother and the rest of the Dennis the Menace cast were unaware of the abuse, and he concealed his unhappiness due to threatened retribution from his aunt. In a 1993 interview, North's childhood co-star, Jeannie Russell, said, "If Jay says she abused him in private, then I'm inclined to believe it. The sheer demands of being in every scene all by itself had to be extremely stressful. Any extra pressure from [his aunt] would have made it unbearable." In 2007, she said: "'The show comes first.' This was the ethic that we were raised in. Had I seen any abuse or any horrible upset on Jay's part, I would have noticed. It would have impacted me. It would have upset me terribly."

By the fourth season, North was earning $3,500 (equivalent to about $38,000 in 2025) an episode; but by 1962, the 11-year-old had begun to outgrow the character's childish antics. This, combined with the unexpected death of the actor who played Dennis' foil, Mr. Wilson (Joseph Kearns), near the end of season three, had changed the dynamic of the show. During his interview with Filmfax, North recalled: "Between the pressures of the business and Joe's dying, I became very serious, very morbid, and very withdrawn from the world. I was the antithesis of the little kid that I played on the television show." By the end of the fourth season, ratings were down, and in early 1963, to his relief, Dennis the Menace was canceled.

=== Teen years ===
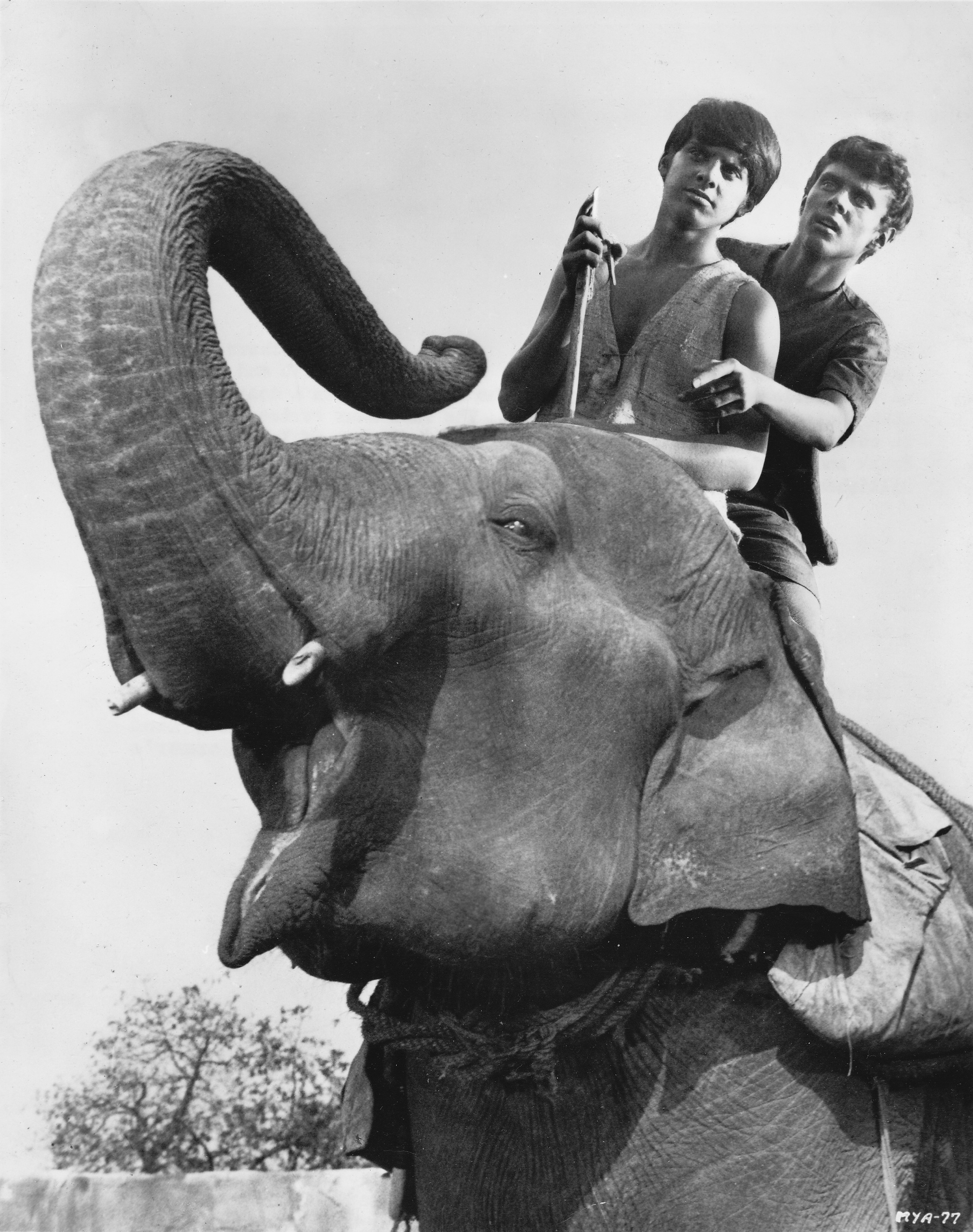
North with Sajid Khan in Maya, 1967

In late 1963, North's mother enrolled him in a preparatory school, but due to his part-time education while filming Dennis the Menace, combined with not having been allowed to socialize with other children, he struggled to keep up with his studies at his new school, and was nervous interacting with the other students. North continued to audition, and in 1964, he appeared in an episode of Wagon Train, but found himself typecast as the impish Dennis Mitchell and had trouble finding steady work. In 1999, North told the E! network, "I had to fight the ghost of Dennis the Menace, and I was typecast. I still had the face, and that's what casting directors, producers, and directors saw when I would go in to read for a role."

In 1965, he landed the lead role in the Metro-Goldwyn-Mayer (MGM) family comedy film Zebra in the Kitchen as Chris Carlyle, a boy, who, unhappy with the living conditions he finds at his local zoo, decides to set the animals free, causing chaos throughout the town. Over the next year, he continued to appear in small television roles, guest-starring on the MGM TV series The Man from U.N.C.L.E. and reuniting with his former Dennis the Menace co-star Gale Gordon on The Lucy Show. In 1966, North landed the starring role in another MGM family adventure film, Maya. In the movie, which was filmed on location in India, North played Terry Bowen, a boy who navigates the Indian jungle with a Hindu boy and an elephant and her baby calf, the latter a sacred white elephant. He continued to appear in small guest-starring roles on television shows such as My Three Sons and Jericho, and in 1967, NBC decided to make a television series adaptation of Maya. North agreed to reprise his role and was soon back filming on location in India.

The feature film Maya and subsequent television series made North a popular teen idol of the era, featured in numerous teen magazines such as Tiger Beat, 16 Magazine, Teen Datebook, and Flip. While Maya proved popular with teen audiences, the NBC series struggled in its time slot against popular shows of the time, CBS's The Jackie Gleason Show and ABC's The Dating Game and The Newlywed Game, and was canceled after one season. Years later, North spoke fondly of his experience on the series, saying, "I can say that I'm really proud of my work on Maya, from a professional standpoint. I got to play an adult role and it was a challenge." North had missed a full year of school while filming Maya in India, and after returning home to Hollywood, began a normal life in high school, graduating from Rexford Senior High School in Beverly Hills in 1969.

Meanwhile in 1969, North also narrated the surf film The Fantastic Plastic Machine.

=== Adult years ===
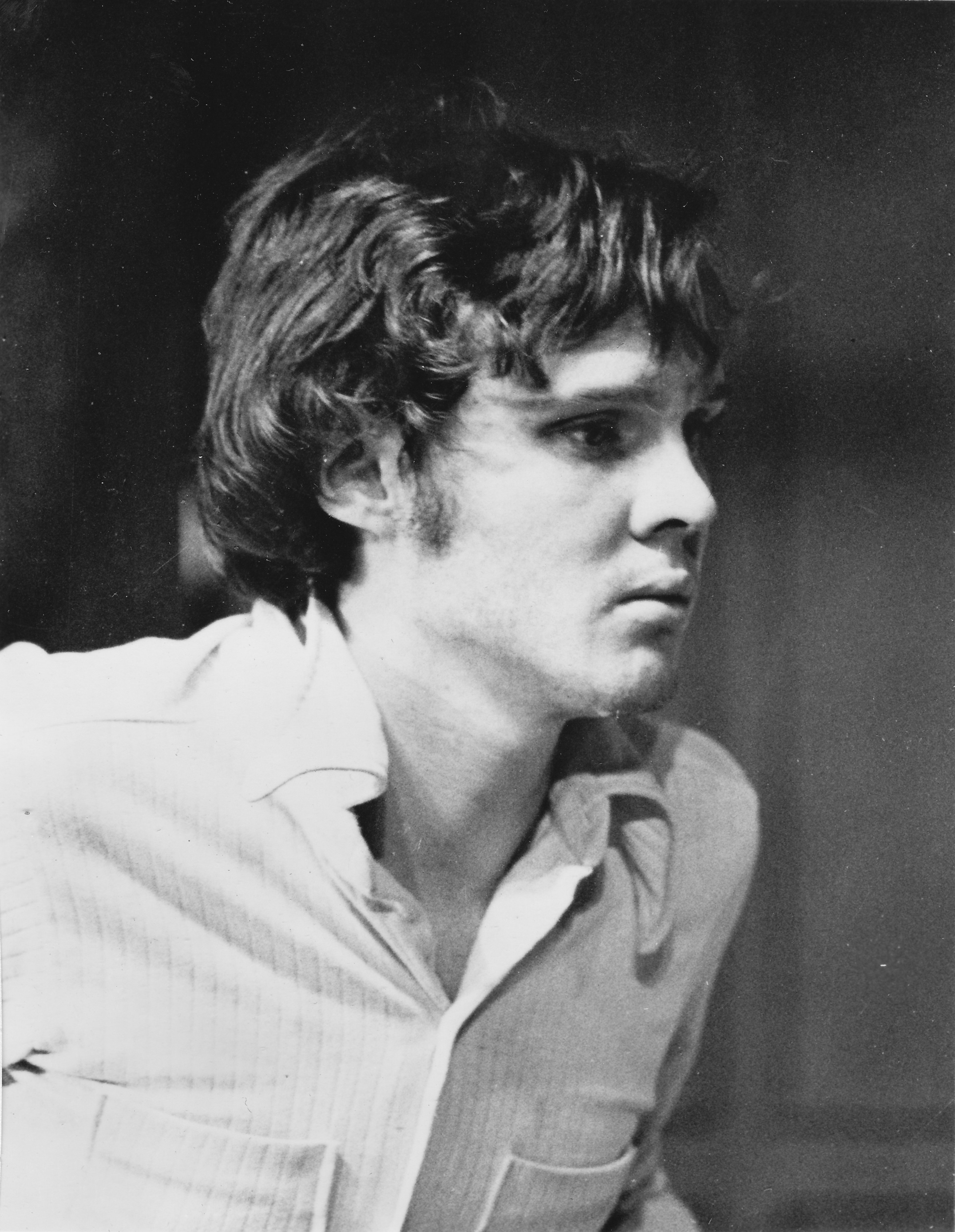
North as Don Baker in a dinner theater production of Butterflies Are Free, c. 1973

After completing filming on the Maya television series, North found work as a voice actor for animated television series, providing the voices of Prince Turhan in the Arabian Knights segment of The Banana Splits Adventure Hour, Terry Dexter in Here Comes the Grump, and a teenaged Bamm-Bamm Rubble on The Pebbles and Bamm-Bamm Show. In 1971, he left Hollywood for Chicago to perform in dinner theater, appearing in several stage productions, including principal roles in Norman, Is That You? and Butterflies Are Free. In January 1972, while appearing in Butterflies Are Free, 20-year-old North met actress Kathleen Brucher, who had a four-year-old son from a previous marriage. After touring with the production for over a year, the two returned to Los Angeles and were married on July 20, 1973, but the marriage lasted less than a year. The young couple separated in April 1974, and their divorce was final on October 21, 1974.

In 1974, North appeared in his last starring role in the R-rated coming-of-age suspense thriller The Teacher, opposite Angel Tompkins. Though the film's adult themes were branded "vulgar" and "lurid" by some who still thought of North as his Dennis character from 10 years prior, Los Angeles Times critic Kevin Thomas appreciated North's work in the film, writing,

The plot of The Teacher isn't worth outlining, yet it develops a relationship between a 28-year-old woman and an 18-year-old high school boy with sensitivity and credibility unusual for an exploitation film. [...] Avedis displays much concern for his people and allows Miss Tompkins and North plenty of room to give fresh, spontaneous performances.

Over the next several years, North held onto the hope of being rediscovered by Hollywood and continued to take acting classes, but by early 1977, disillusioned with his career in show business, he left acting and enlisted in the U.S. Navy. In January 1977, he reported to Navy boot camp at NTC Orlando. He was assigned to the USS Iwo Jima, stationed in Norfolk, Virginia, as a seaman recruit boatswain's mate, the Navy's lowest rank. He received good evaluations for his work, but was unprepared for the harsh treatment he received from his shipmates and superiors for being a former child star. Within a year, he wanted out of the Navy. He then began his administrative process and was temporarily assigned on board the destroyer tender USS Dixie stationed in Long Beach, California. On August 10, 1979, he left the Dixie and the Navy with an honorable discharge and returned to Los Angeles.

In 1980, he appeared in a cameo role in the television movie Scout's Honor, with other former child stars Angela Cartwright from The Danny Thomas Show, Lauren Chapin from Father Knows Best, and Paul Petersen from The Donna Reed Show. In 1982, he landed a week-long stint on the daytime soap General Hospital, but steady work in show business continued to elude him. Financially secure from real estate investments his mother had made with his earnings from Dennis The Menace and frustrated by the direction his career had taken, he retreated from public life for the next several years and worked in the health-food industry. In 1984, he optioned the book Burn Judy, Burn for $5,000, hoping to play the lead role of executed killer Steven Judy. In his 1999 interview with E!, North spoke of his desire to play darker roles: "I was ready to play very dramatic, scary-type characters. I thought maybe if I played some villains and scared the pants off of people, maybe Hollywood might take me seriously." However, the Steven Judy story never made it to the screen.

In January 1986, North landed a small role in the Yugoslavian feature film Divlji Vetar (Wild Wind). Later that year, he read for the role of serial killer Ted Bundy in the television miniseries The Deliberate Stranger, but lost the part to Mark Harmon. Still interested in stories about serial killers, North decided to try his hand at screenwriting. His first script was about a 1984 prison break by six death-row inmates from Virginia's Mecklenburg Correctional Center, but the screenplay was never completed. Throughout the rest of the 1980s, he appeared with other former television stars on news and talk shows such as Good Morning America, Donahue, and Oprah. In October 1988, he acted out his frustrations toward Hollywood in a comedy sketch on an episode of HBO's Not Necessarily the News, satirizing his role as Dennis the Menace. Dressed in overalls, striped t-shirt, and cowlick, 37-year-old North portrayed an angry adult Dennis, taking revenge on "Hollywood pigs" with a telescopic rifle.

== After acting ==
=== Hoaxes ===
On the morning of December 8, 1988, North was at the center of a widely reported hoax. His mother received the news that he had died in a doctor's office that morning. According to a story from United Press International, his body had been found at 12:35 that morning. The article quoted an alleged doctor, Robert Tobias, whom North actually had never met. Around this same time, he also dealt with several impostors. One man, who resembled North in his youth, rented limousines and attended Hollywood parties impersonating him. At the time, North told Knight-Ridder news agency, "I'm not on the 'A' party list. I'm not a hot item, so they don't know what I look like. I really haven't worked a lot in a long time."

=== A Minor Consideration ===
On January 18, 1990, North received a phone call from Paul Petersen telling him that former child star Rusty Hamer from The Danny Thomas Show had died by suicide. Hamer's death was a turning point for North when childhood friends Petersen (Jeff Stone on The Donna Reed Show) and Jeannie Russell (Margaret Wade on Dennis the Menace), concerned with North's similarities, put him in contact with therapist Stan W. Ziegler, who specialized in troubled former child actors. North later joined Petersen's organization, A Minor Consideration, using his experiences to counsel child stars dealing with the same pressures and difficulties he had faced growing up.

== Personal life and death ==
On March 2, 1991, North married his second wife, Rositia. The couple had met on a blind date and separated three months after their wedding. On April 14, 1992, he met caterer Cindy Hackney at a party after a charity event for pediatric AIDS in Gainesville, Florida. On March 3, 1993, they were married, and three months later, still financially well-off as a result of his mother's investments of his earnings as a child star, North left Los Angeles and moved to Hackney's hometown of Lake Butler, Florida, becoming stepfather to her three daughters. This move was a permanent break from the Hollywood area that had troubled him. That year, with the release of the 1993 feature film Dennis the Menace, the media sought what had become of the "original" Dennis. This renewed interest prompted him to publicly disclose the abuse he had experienced as a child star.

In May 1997, having come to terms with the physical and emotional abuse he had suffered at the hands of his aunt and uncle, North began attending memorabilia shows to meet with fans. After moving to Florida, he began working as a correctional officer, reportedly working with troubled youth within Florida's juvenile justice system and as of 2011, continued to work for the Florida Department of Corrections.

From the early 1990s, North made occasional appearances on talk shows, documentaries, cameo appearances as "himself" on The Simpsons, and in the comedy feature film Dickie Roberts: Former Child Star. In 1999, he concluded his E! interview by saying, "I am so happy that I was able to have such a positive impact on people's lives. I'm going to write my autobiography and then I'm just going to live a contented, happy life here in Lake Butler with the people I love, and kind of just vanish into the mists of time."

North died of colorectal cancer at his home in Lake Butler, Florida, on April 6, 2025, at the age of 73. He had been battling the disease for several years.

== Filmography ==
=== Television ===
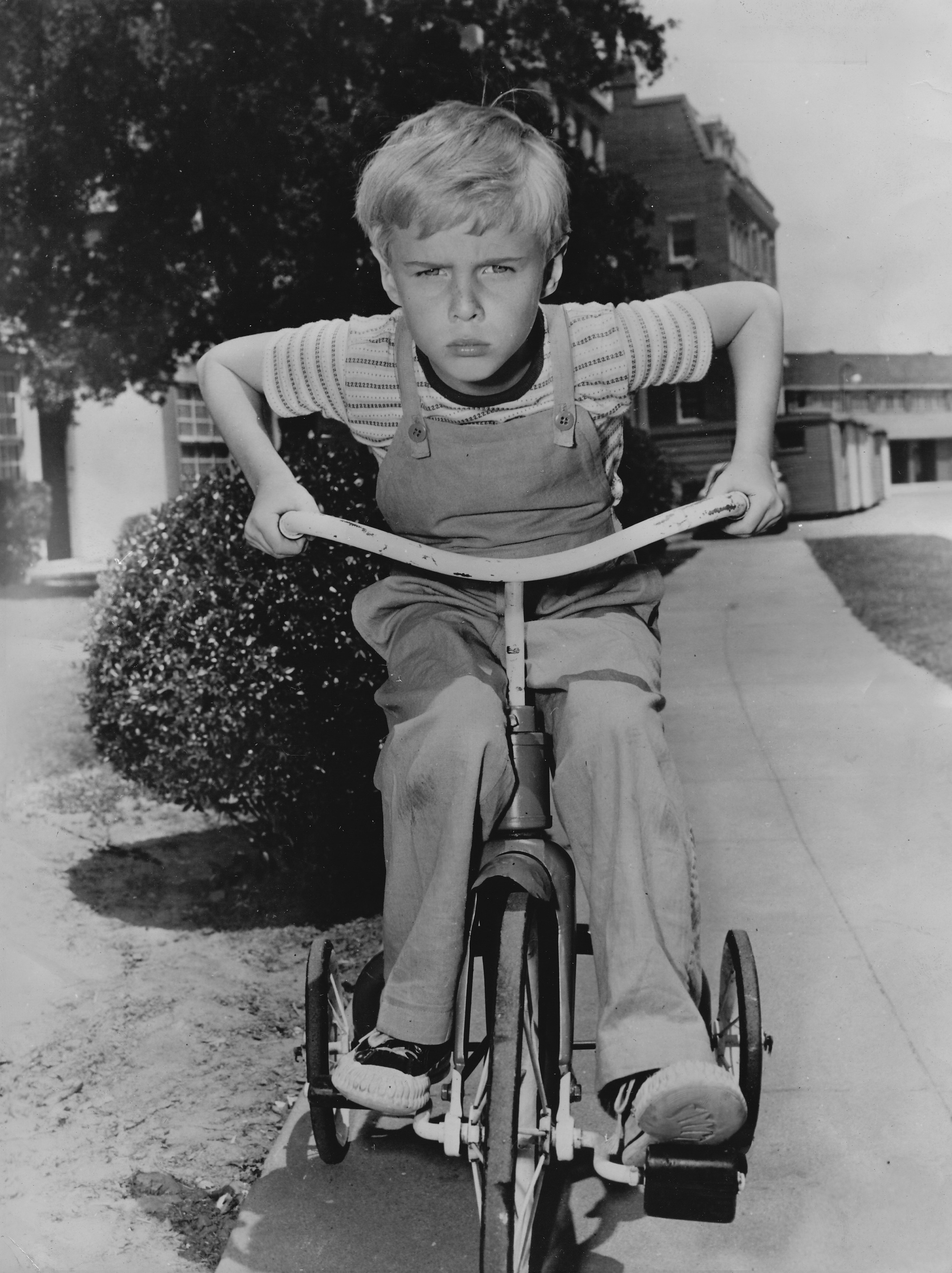
North as Dennis Mitchell, 1959

- Cartoon Express with Engineer Bill (1957)
- Queen for a Day (1958)
- The George Gobel Show (1958)
- The Eddie Fisher Show (1958)
- The Milton Berle Show (1958)
- Wanted: Dead or Alive (1958)
- 77 Sunset Strip (1959)
- Rescue 8 (1959)
- Cheyenne (1959)
- Bronco (1959)
- Colt .45 (1959)
- Sugarfoot (Bobby in "The Giant Killer") (1959)
- The Detectives Starring Robert Taylor (1959)
- The Tennessee Ernie Ford Show (1959)
- The Ed Sullivan Show (1960)
- The Donna Reed Show (1960)
- The Red Skelton Hour (1960)
- The Dinah Shore Chevy Show (1960)
- Art Linkletter's House Party (1961)
- Dennis the Menace (1959–1963)
- Wagon Train (1964)
- The Man from U.N.C.L.E. (1965)
- The Lucy Show (1966)
- My Three Sons (1966)
- Jericho (1966)
- The Lone Ranger (1966)
- Maya (1967–1968)
- Arabian Knights (1968)
- Here Comes the Grump (1969–1971)
- The Pebbles and Bamm-Bamm Show (1971)
- The Flintstone Comedy Hour (1972)
- Lassie (1973)
- Fred Flintstone and Friends (1977)
- Scout's Honor (1980)
- General Hospital (1982)
- Our Time (1985)
- Not Necessarily the News (1988)
- Couch Potatoes (1989)
- The Simpsons (1999)

=== Film ===
- The Miracle of the Hills (1959)
- The Big Operator (1959)
- Pépé (1960)
- Zebra in the Kitchen (1965)
- Maya (1966)
- The Teacher (1974)
- Dikiy veter (Wild Wind) (1985)
- Dickie Roberts: Former Child Star (2003)
