= Bill Stulla =

American children's television host

William Stulla (May 24, 1911 – August 12, 2008), also known as Engineer Bill, (1955-1966) was an American children's television host. He was born in New York City.

From 1951 to 1954, he hosted "Bill Stulla's Parlor Party." Later, he hosted Cartoon Express on Los Angeles's KHJ-TV 9 (Ind) from 1954 to 1966; in this position, he won two Emmy Awards. In addition to the usual cartoons (early era Looney Tunes, Spunky and Tadpole, and Colonel Bleep), the show included a game called "Red Light, Green Light" where children were given glasses of milk which they would drink when the announcer said "green light" and stop drinking when he said "red light". If they finished their glass before the game was over, they lost and were referred to as "gulpers". Also featured on the show was "Little Mo, the bad habit buster," in which a small model electric train engine attempted to push a model boxcar containing the "bad habit" of the week into a bin, located at the top of an incline. A new bad habit was named on Monday, and the effort concluded, usually successfully, on Friday. Also featured was a "Get Well Wall," in which well-wishes were sent to children who were ill, who were listed as a "Get Well Bell" rung. Bill Stulla closed his show with his signature message to his young audience, "Happy highball, engineers!"

In 1966, he retired from broadcasting and became a stockbroker. He died in Los Angeles in 2008, aged 97.

Stulla is credited as an inspiration in the liner notes for the 1966 Mothers of Invention album, Freak Out.
