= Dennis the Menace (1959 TV series) =

American sitcom (1959–1963)

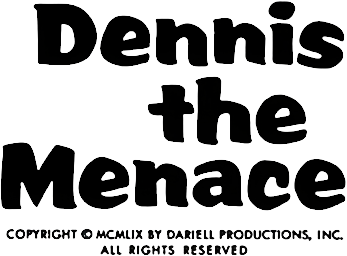
- Logo for the first three seasons
- Genre: Sitcom
- Based on: Dennis the Menace by Hank Ketcham
- Starring: Jay North; Herbert Anderson; Gloria Henry; Jeannie Russell; Joseph Kearns; Gale Gordon; Sylvia Field; Sara Seegar
- Theme music composer: William Loose; John Seely
- Country of origin: United States
- Original language: English
- No. of seasons: 4
- No. of episodes: 146 (list of episodes)

Production
- Executive producer: Harry Ackerman
- Producers: James Fonda (1959–61); Winston O'Keefe (1961–63)
- Running time: 25 minutes
- Production companies: Dariell Productions; Screen Gems; Hank Ketcham Enterprises Inc.

Original release
- Network: CBS
- Release: October 4, 1959 – July 7, 1963

Dennis the Menace is an American sitcom based on the Hank Ketcham comic strip of the same name. It preceded The Ed Sullivan Show on Sunday evenings on CBS from October 4, 1959, to July 7, 1963. The series starred Jay North as Dennis Mitchell; Herbert Anderson as his father, Henry; Gloria Henry as his mother, Alice; Joseph Kearns as George Wilson; Gale Gordon as George's brother, John Wilson; Sylvia Field as George's wife, Martha Wilson; and Sara Seegar as John's wife, Eloise Wilson. Network reruns continued until September 22, 1963.

Originally sponsored by Kellogg's cereals and Best Foods (Skippy peanut butter), the series was produced by Dariell Productions and Screen Gems.

== Plot ==
The show follows the Mitchell family – Henry, Alice, and their only child, Dennis, an energetic, trouble-prone, mischievous, but well-meaning boy, who often tangles first with his peace-and-quiet-loving neighbor, George Wilson, a retired salesman, and later with George's brother John, a writer. Mr. Wilson has a love-hate relationship toward Dennis. Dennis calls Mr. Wilson his "best friend" or "Good Ol' Mr. Wilson".

== History ==
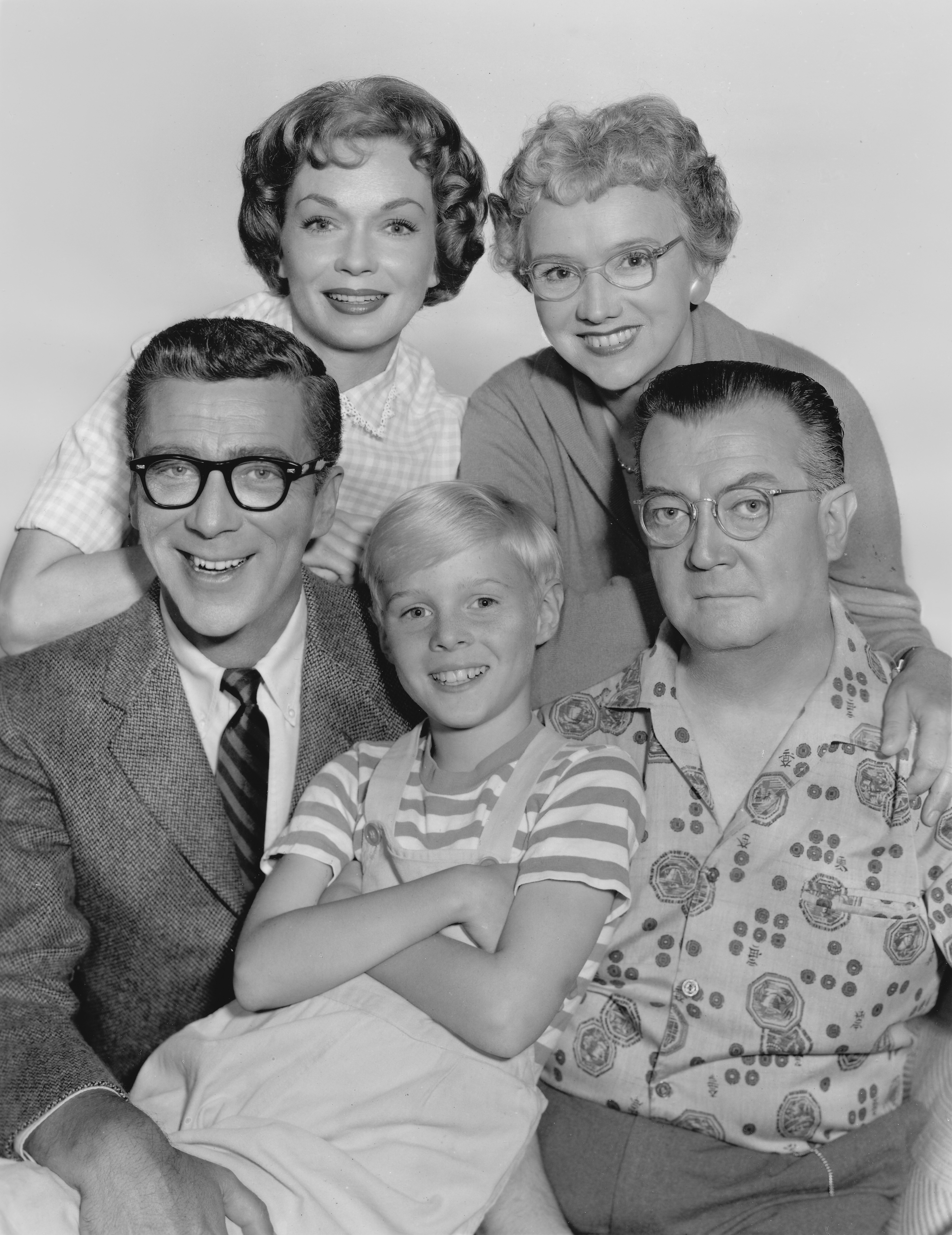
The original cast of Dennis the Menace in 1960. Clockwise from front center: Jay North, Herbert Anderson, Gloria Henry, Sylvia Field, and Joseph Kearns.

With CBS seeking to replace the hit show it had lost when it allowed Leave It to Beaver to migrate to ABC, a pilot episode titled "Dennis Goes to the Movies" was filmed in late 1958.

In early 1959, CBS consented to air the program at 7:30 pm EST on Sunday evenings after Lassie. After viewing these episodes, CBS determined that Dennis' antics had to be toned down lest his actions would encourage children watching the show to imitate Dennis.

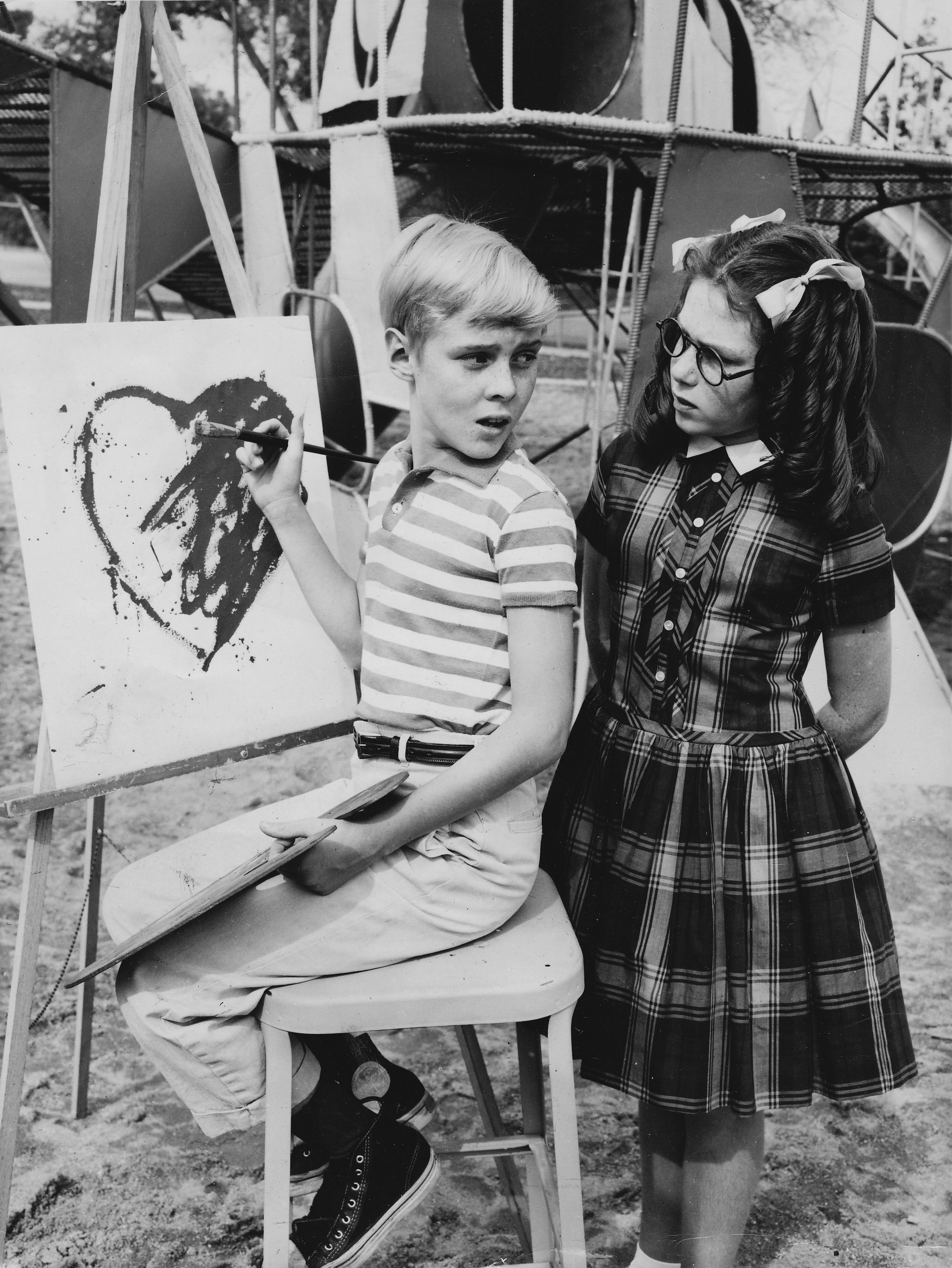
Jay North as Dennis and Jeannie Russell as Margaret Wade, 1963: In this final fourth season, Dennis no longer wears his trademark overalls.

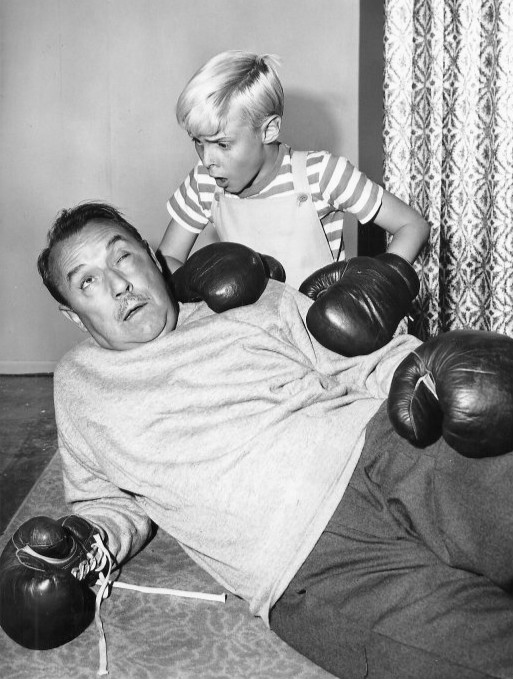
Jay North as Dennis and Gale Gordon as John Wilson, 1962

On February 17, 1962, after filming the show's 100th episode, Joseph Kearns died of a cerebral hemorrhage. In a 2010 interview, actress Gloria Henry revealed Kearns followed a strict six-week Metrecal diet that may have contributed to his death. The following two episodes were filmed without the character of Mr. Wilson.

Gale Gordon joined the cast for the last six episodes of the season as Mr. Wilson's brother John. It was explained that John was staying as a guest while George was settling an estate. Sylvia Field, who played Martha Wilson, was let go at the end of the season. In the fourth and final season, John purchased the house from his brother, although where George and Martha had moved was never explained. He was joined by his wife Eloise, played by Sara Seegar. Final references to George and Martha Wilson were made early in the fourth season, although they were not mentioned by name after the first episode. George Wilson was referred to as "the other Mr. Wilson" in the second episode, and John Wilson says in the seventh episode that he bought the house from his brother. After that, the original Wilsons were never mentioned again.

By the end of the show's fourth season, Jay North was nearly 12 years old and was outgrowing the antics associated with his character. CBS canceled Dennis the Menace in early 1963.

=== Syndication ===
In 1963, NBC began airing reruns of the series on Saturday mornings for two seasons – the show entered syndication in 1965. It has run consistently on local stations over subsequent years. On July 1, 1985, the Nickelodeon cable network began airing the series, and continued until October 22, 1994, after Nick Jr. It also aired on TV Land from 2002 to 2003. On January 3, 2011, Dennis the Menace began airing on Antenna TV until it was removed on December 31, 2025.

Screen Gems exported the show to the United Kingdom, where it was shown on the Granada Television network in Lancashire and Yorkshire and on Associated-Rediffusion in London between 1960 and 1966. The series was known as Just Dennis (and as Dennis (The Pickle) at one point) in the UK to avoid confusion with the British comic character.

== Cast ==
=== Main characters ===
- Jay North as Dennis Mitchell
- Herbert Anderson as Henry Mitchell, Dennis's father and Alice's husband
- Gloria Henry as Alice Mitchell, Henry's wife and Dennis's mother
- Joseph Kearns as Mr. George Wilson, the Mitchells' neighbor; he is often exasperated with Dennis' antics, though is proud that Dennis considers him his best friend. He has a Cairn Terrier named Fremont.
- Sylvia Field as Mrs. Martha Wilson, George's wife, a loving, grandmotherly type neighbor who enjoys Dennis' company. Martha was written out of the series after Joseph Kearns's death.
- Jeannie Russell as Margaret Wade, a snooty but good girl with a crush on Dennis
- Billy Booth as Tommy Anderson, Dennis' closest friend
- Gale Gordon as Mr. John Wilson, George Wilson's brother who buys his house in the fourth season
- Sara Seegar as Mrs. Eloise Wilson, John's wife

=== Recurring characters ===
- Robert John Pittman as Seymour Williams, Dennis's friend
- Gregory Irvin as Johnny Bradys, Dennis's nemesis
- Laurence Haddon as Charles Brady, Johnny's father
- George Cisar as Sergeant Harold Mooney, a policeman (in some episodes, Mooney's first name is Ralph)
- Irene Tedrow as Mrs. Lucy Elkins, a Mitchell neighbor and an avowed enemy of both Wilson brothers
- Willard Waterman as Mr. Otis Quigley, the grocer
- Mary Wickes as Miss Esther Cathcart, a spinster who chases every single bachelor in sight
- Charles Seel as Mr. Krinkie, the newspaper editor
- Kathleen Mulqueen as Grandma Mitchell, Henry's mother, who stayed with the Mitchells during the second season while Alice was away taking care of her father
- Gil Smith as Joey McDonald, Dennis' friend
- Lillian Culver as Mrs. Schooner, a local socialite, volunteer, and outdoor enthusiast
- Charles Lane as Mr. Lawrence Finch, the drugstore owner
- Ron Howard as Stewart, Dennis's friend
- Helen Kleeb as Mrs. Dorothy Holland, a Mitchell neighbor and Mrs. Elkins' friend (Kleeb also appeared in 3 other episodes, but not as Mrs. Holland)
- Robert B. Williams as Mr. Dorfman, a postman who is one of Miss Cathcart's targets
- Will Wright as Mr. Merrivale, a nurseryman who is considered a shady businessman by most of the neighborhood

=== Guest characters ===
- Edward Everett Horton as Uncle Ned Matthews, George and John Wilson's uncle
- Dub Taylor as Opie Swanson, an electrician
- Chubby Johnson as Buzz, the neighborhood handyman
- Ned Wever as Foster A. Steward, the chief of police

== Episodes ==
Season	Episodes	Originally released	
Season	Episodes	First released	Last released
1	32	October 4, 1959	June 6, 1960
2	38	October 2, 1960	June 25, 1961
3	38	October 1, 1961	July 1, 1962
4	38	September 30, 1962	July 7, 1963

== Reception ==
Ratings
Season	Rank (Rating)
1) 1959–60	# 16 (26.0)
2) 1960–61	# 11 (26.1)
3) 1961–62	# 17 (23.8)
4) 1962–63	Not In The Top 30

== Home media ==
All four seasons of Dennis the Menace have been released on DVD from Shout! Factory, as well as a compilation set featuring twenty of the best episodes.

Title	No. of discs	Release date (Region 1)	Special features
Dennis the Menace: Season One	5	March 29, 2011	New interview with Gloria Henry and Jeannie Russell; Radio interview Gloria Henry and Jeannie Russell; CBS Promos; The Donna Reed Show crossover episode, "Donna Decorates"
Dennis the Menace: Season Two	5	July 26, 2011	Original promos
Dennis the Menace: Season Three	5	October 25, 2011	None
Dennis the Menace: The Final Season	5	January 10, 2012	None
Dennis the Menace: 20 Timeless Episodes	2	August 7, 2012	None

== See also ==
- Dennis the Menace (film)

== Bibliography ==
- Tim Brooks and Earle Marsh, The Complete Directory to Prime Time Network and Cable TV Shows 1946–Present, Ninth edition (New York: Ballantine Books, 2007) ISBN 978-0-345-49773-4
